= 1963 European Figure Skating Championships =

Figure skating competition

1963 European Championships
- Type: ISU Championship
- Date: February 5 – 10
- Season: 1962-63
- Location: Budapest, Hungary

Champions
- Men's singles: (France) Alain Calmat
- Ladies' singles: (Netherlands) Sjoukje Dijkstra
- Pairs: (West Germany) Marika Kilius / Hans-Jürgen Bäumler
- Ice dance: (United Kingdom) Linda Shearman / Michael Phillips
- Previous: 1962 European Championships
- Next: 1964 European Championships

The 1963 European Figure Skating Championships were held in Budapest, Hungary from February 5 to 10, 1963. Elite senior-level figure skaters from European ISU member nations competed for the title of European Champion in the disciplines of men's singles, ladies' singles, pair skating, and ice dancing. The event was held outdoors in poor weather; snow and sleet caused the delay of one of the men's figure competitions, and the ice had to be swept between each pairs performance.

== Results ==
=== Men ===
Rank	Name	Places
1	(France) Alain Calmat	
2	(West Germany) Manfred Schnelldorfer	
3	(Austria) Emmerich Danzer	
4	(Austria) Peter Jonas	
5	(West Germany) Sepp Schönmetzler	
6	(East Germany) Ralph Borghard	
7	(Soviet Union) Valeriy Meshkov	
8	(Hungary) Jenő Ébert	
9	(West Germany) Hugo Dümmler	
10	(Austria) Heinrich Podhajsky	
11	(France) Robert Dureville	
12	(United Kingdom) Malcolm Cannon	
13	(Czechoslovakia) Václav Kotek	
14	(Netherlands) Wouter Toledo	
15	(Italy) Giordano Abbondati	
16	(France) Philippe Pélissier	
17	(Switzerland) Markus Germann	
18	(United Kingdom) Hywel Evans	
19	(East Germany) Günter Zöller	
20	(Poland) Franciszek Spitol	
21	(Czechoslovakia) Marián Filc	

=== Ladies ===
Rank	Name	Places
1	(Netherlands) Sjoukje Dijkstra	
2	(France) Nicole Hassler	
3	(Austria) Regine Heitzer	
4	(Czechoslovakia) Jana Mrázková	
5	(United Kingdom) Sally-Anne Stapleford	
6	(United Kingdom) Diana Clifton-Peach	
7	(United Kingdom) Jacqueline Harbord	
8	(Austria) Ingrid Ostler	
9	(Switzerland) Franziska Schmidt	
10	(East Germany) Gabriele Seyfert	
11	(West Germany) Karin Gude	
12	(Sweden) Ann-Margreth Frei	
13	(Italy) Sandra Brugnera	
14	(Austria) Astrid Czermak	
15	(Czechoslovakia) Hana Mašková	
16	(Hungary) Zsuzsa Szentmiklóssy	
17	(Belgium) Christine van de Putte	
18	(France) Micheline Joubert	
19	(Switzerland) Dorette Bek	
20	(Soviet Union) Tamara Bratus	
21	(Poland) Elżbieta Kościk	
WD	(Norway) Karin Dehle	DNS

=== Pairs ===
Rank	Name	Places
1	(West Germany) Marika Kilius / Hans-Jürgen Bäumler	
2	(Soviet Union) Lyudmila Belousova / Oleg Protopopov	
3	(Soviet Union) Tatyana Zhuk / Aleksandr Gavrilov	
4	(East Germany) Margit Senf / Peter Göbel	
5	(Czechoslovakia) Milada Kubíková / Jaroslav Votruba	
6	(Switzerland) Gerda Johner / Rüdi Johner	
7	(Czechoslovakia) Agnesa Wlachovská / Peter Bartosiewicz	
8	(East Germany) Brigitte Wokoeck / Heinz-Ulrich Walther	
9	(West Germany) Sonja Pfersdorf / Günther Matzdorf	
10	(East Germany) Irene Müller / Hans-Georg Dallmer	
11	(West Germany) Sigrid Riechmann / Wolfgang Danne	
12	(Soviet Union) Galina Sedova / Georgiy Proskurin	
13	(Austria) Inge Strell / Ferry Dedovich	
14	(Austria) Gerlinde Schönbauer / Wilhelm Bietak	
15	(Hungary) Mária Csordás / László Kondi	

=== Ice dance ===
Rank	Name	Places
1	(United Kingdom) Linda Shearman / Michael Phillips	
2	(Czechoslovakia) Eva Romanová / Pavel Roman	
3	(United Kingdom) Janet Sawbridge / David Hickinbottom	
4	(Hungary) Györgyi Korda / Pál Vásárhelyi	34
5	(United Kingdom) Mary Parry / Roy Mason	
6	(Switzerland) Marlyse Fornachon / Charly Pichard	
7	(Czechoslovakia) Jitka Babická / Jaromír Holan	
8	(France) Ghislaine Houdas / Francis Gamichon	
9	(West Germany) Helga Burkhardt / Hannes Burkhardt	
10	(France) Armelle Flichy / Pierre Brun	
11	(Austria) Christel Trebesiner / Georg Felsinger	
12	(West Germany) Rita Paucka / Peter Kwiet	
13	(East Germany) Eva Reuter / Bernd Egert	
