= 1961 European Figure Skating Championships =

Figure skating competition

- Type: ISU Championship
- Date: January 26 – 29
- Season: 1961
- Location: West Berlin, American Sector
- Host: Deutscher Eislauf-Verband (DEV)
- Venue: Berlin Sportpalast

Champions
- Men's singles: (France) Alain Giletti
- Ladies' singles: (Netherlands) Sjoukje Dijkstra
- Pairs: (West Germany) Marika Kilius / Hans-Jürgen Bäumler
- Ice dance: (United Kingdom) Doreen Denny / Courtney Jones
- Previous: 1960 European Figure Skating Championships
- Next: 1962 European Figure Skating Championships

The 1961 European Figure Skating Championships is an annual figure skating competition sanctioned by the International Skating Union in which figure skaters compete for the title of European Champion in the disciplines of men's singles, ladies' singles, pair skating, and ice dancing.

The competitions took place from January 26 to 29, 1961 in West Berlin. West Berlin was de jure not part of West Germany, but the German Skating Association of East Germany organized the championships. The event took place without the participation of skaters from the Soviet Union not because of a political boycott, but rather because an exceptionally mild winter left the Russian skaters with insufficient ice for practice in their home country. The Soviet team was also withdrawn from the originally planned World Championships for the same reason, but that tournament was subsequently cancelled after Sabena Flight 548.

The defending champions in all four divisions retained their titles. In the pairs competition, however, the champions Marika Kilius & Hans-Jürgen Bäumler faced a close battle with Margret Göbl & Franz Ningel, who had defeated them at the West German championships earlier in the season. Göbl & Ningel may have been penalized for including an illegal lift in their program.

In the ladies' event, Sjoukje Dijkstra built up a lead in the compulsory figures that assured her of victory. Her free skating program was described as "exhausting". The stars of the free skating were Helli Sengstschmidt and Jana Mrázková, who both reportedly did triple salchow jumps in their programs.

Alain Giletti likewise assured himself of victory by winning the figures by a large margin. All three medalists in the men's division gave fine free skating performances.

== Results ==
=== Men ===
Rank	Name	Places
1	(France) Alain Giletti	9
2	(France) Alain Calmat	11
3	(West Germany) Manfred Schnelldorfer	23
4	(Austria) Peter Jonas	37
5	(Austria) Emmerich Danzer	51.5
6	(United Kingdom) Robin Jones	55.5
7	(West Germany) Sepp Schönmetzler	65
8	(East Germany) Bodo Bockenauer	79
9	(Austria) Heinrich Podhajsky	80
10	(Norway) Per Kjølberg	87
11	(West Germany) Peter Krick	91
12	(Netherlands) Wouter Toledo	111
13	(East Germany) Michael Flebbe	112
14	(Italy) Giordano Abbondati	122
15	(Finland) Ragnar Wikström	135

Judges were

- (France) P. Baron
- (Netherlands) Charlotte Benedict-Stieber
- (West Germany) K. Beyer
- (United Kingdom) Pamela Davis
- (Switzerland) A. Jaisli
- (Hungary) Ferenc Kertész
- (Austria) Hans Meixner
- (Italy) Giovanni de Mori
- (East Germany) E. A. Voigt

=== Ladies ===
Rank	Name	Places
1	(Netherlands) Sjoukje Dijkstra	9
2	(Austria) Regine Heitzer	21
3	(Czechoslovakia) Jana Mrázková	26
4	(Austria) Karin Frohner	49
5	(France) Dany Rigoulot	57
6	(Austria) Helli Sengstschmid	58
7	(Czechoslovakia) Eva Grožajová	66
8	(France) Nicole Hassler	73
9	(United Kingdom) Diana Clifton-Peach	77
10	(Czechoslovakia) Jitka Hlaváčková	83
11	(United Kingdom) Anne Reynolds	85
12	(West Germany) Karin Gude	90
13	(Switzerland) Franziska Schmidt	115
14	(Italy) Christa Fassi	136
15	(France) Danièle Giraud	141
16	(West Germany) Ursula Barkey	147
17	(Hungary) Éva Csoma	162
18	(Hungary) Helga Zöllner	169
19	(Switzerland) Dorette Bek	175
20	(Italy) Silvana Saccozzi	178
21	(East Germany) Gabriele Seyfert	179
22	(Italy) Sandra Brugnera	188
23	(East Germany) Heidemarie Steiner	190
24	(Netherlands) Willie ten Hoopen	216

Judges were

- (Italy) Grazia Barcellona
- (Switzerland) Karl Enderlin
- (Netherlands) Paul Engelfriet
- (Austria) Martin Felsenreich
- (Hungary) Ferenc Kertész
- (Czechoslovakia) Emil Skákala
- (France) Néri Valdes
- (West Germany) Adolf Walker
- (United Kingdom) Geoffrey Yates

=== Pairs ===
Rank	Name	Places
1	(West Germany) Marika Kilius / Hans-Jürgen Bäumler	13
2	(West Germany) Margret Göbl / Franz Ningel	14
3	(East Germany) Margit Senf / Peter Göbel	38.5
4	(West Germany) Rita Blumenberg / Werner Mensching	36
5	(Austria) Diana Hinko / Heinz Döpfl	43.5
6	(Czechoslovakia) Hana Dvořáková / Karel Vosátka	52.5
7	(United Kingdom) Valerie Hunt / Peter Burrows	69.5
8	(Switzerland) Gerda Johner / Rüdi Johner	74.5
9	(East Germany) Irene Müller / Hans-Georg Dallmer	75.5
10	(East Germany) Renate Rößler / Klaus Wasserfuhr	78

Judges were

- (East Germany) Ernst K. Bauch
- (Netherlands) Charlotte Benedict-Stieber
- (United Kingdom) Pamela Davis
- (Switzerland) A. Jaisli
- (West Germany) Theo Klemm
- (Austria) Hans Meixner
- (Italy) Giovanni de Mori
- (Czechoslovakia) Emil Skákala
- (France) Néri Valdes

=== Ice dance ===
Rank	Name	Places
1	(United Kingdom) Doreen Denny / Courtney Jones	7
2	(France) Christiane Guhel / Jean Guhel	14
3	(United Kingdom) Linda Shearman / Michael Philipps	25
4	(United Kingdom) Mary Parry / Roy Mason	26
5	(Czechoslovakia) Eva Romanová / Pavel Roman	33
6	(West Germany) Rita Paucka / Peter Kwiet	46
7	(Italy) Olga Gilardi / Germano Ceccattini	47
8	(Italy) Ludovica Boccacci / Gianfranco Canepa	63
9	(France) Armelle Flichy / Pierre Brun	65
10	(Czechoslovakia) Jitka Babická / Jaromír Holan	72
11	(Hungary) Györgyi Korda / Pál Vásárhelyi	73
12	(Austria) Christel Trebesiner / Georg Felsinger	87
13	(West Germany) Margot Nissen / Klaus Ebel	87
14	(Switzerland) Marlyse Fornachon / Charly Pichard	95
15	(West Germany) Martha Schamberger / Hans-Jürgen Schamberger	98

Judges were

- (Italy) Cia Benacchi-Bordogna
- (Hungary) Ferenc Kertész
- (France) L. Lauret
- (United Kingdom) H. Lawrence
- (Austria) Walter Malek
- (West Germany) Hermann Schiechtl
- (Czechoslovakia) Emil Skákala

== Sources ==
- Result List provided by the ISU
- printed program of the Europeans
