= 1962 European Figure Skating Championships =

Figure skating competition

- Type: ISU Championship
- Date: February 27 – March 3
- Season: 1962
- Location: Geneva, Switzerland

Champions
- Men's singles: (France) Alain Calmat
- Ladies' singles: (Netherlands) Sjoukje Dijkstra
- Pairs: (West Germany) Marika Kilius / Hans-Jürgen Bäumler
- Ice dance: (France) Christiane Guhel / Jean Paul Guhel
- Previous: 1961 European Figure Skating Championships
- Next: 1963 European Figure Skating Championships

The European Figure Skating Championships is an annual figure skating competition sanctioned by the International Skating Union in which figure skaters compete for the title of European Champion in the disciplines of men's singles, ladies' singles, pair skating, and ice dancing. The competitions took place from February 27 to March 3, 1962 in Geneva, Switzerland.

== Results ==
=== Men ===
Rank	Name	Places
1	(France) Alain Calmat	14
2	(Czechoslovakia) Karol Divín	15
3	(West Germany) Manfred Schnelldorfer	25
4	(Austria) Peter Jonas	39
5	(Austria) Emmerich Danzer	50
6	(East Germany) Bodo Bockenauer	61
7	(United Kingdom) Robin Jones	61
8	(West Germany) Sepp Schönmetzler	74
9	(Norway) Per Kjølberg	82
10	(Soviet Union) Valeriy Meshkov	89
11	(Hungary) Károly Újlaky	89
12	(United Kingdom) Malcolm Cannon	125
13	(Italy) Giordano Abbondati	128
14	(Austria) Heinrich Podhajsky	128
15	(East Germany) Ralph Borghard	129
16	(France) Robert Dureville	140
17	(West Germany) Fritz Keszler	143
18	(France) Alain Trouillet	155
19	(Switzerland) Markus Germann	170
20	(Netherlands) Wouter Toledo	172
21	(Finland) Ragnar Wikström	189

Judges were

- (Hungary) Zoltán Balázs
- (France) P. Baron
- (Italy) Ercole Cattaneo
- (Norway) Christen Christensen
- (United Kingdom) Pamela Davis
- (Switzerland) Eugen Kirchhofer
- (Austria) Edwin Kucharz
- (East Germany) Carla Listing
- (West Germany) Adolf Walker

=== Ladies ===
Rank	Name	Places
1	(Netherlands) Sjoukje Dijkstra	9
2	(Austria) Regine Heitzer	18
3	(Austria) Karin Frohner	30
4	(Austria) Helli Sengstschmid	43
5	(United Kingdom) Diana Clifton-Peach	53
6	(France) Nicole Hassler	56
7	(Switzerland) Franziska Schmidt	62
8	(Czechoslovakia) Jana Mrázková	69
9	(United Kingdom) Jacqueline Harbord	71
10	(Czechoslovakia) Eva Grožajová	84
11	(Italy) Sandra Brugnera	110
12	(East Germany) Gabriele Seyfert	114
13	(Hungary) Helga Zöllner	129
14	(Norway) Karin Dehle	133
15	(Sweden) Ann-Margreth Frei	133
16	(France) Danièle Giraud	139
17	(Czechoslovakia) Alena Pokorná	152
18	(West Germany) Inge Paul	154
19	(Soviet Union) Tamara Bratus	156
20	(Belgium) Christine van de Putte	175

Judges were

- (United Kingdom) Pauline L. Barrajo
- (East Germany) Ernst K. Bauch
- (Netherlands) Charlotte Benedict-Stieber
- (Norway) Christen Christensen
- (Czechoslovakia) H. Dudová
- (Belgium) Henri Hoyoux
- (West Germany) Theo Klemm
- (Austria) Oskar Madl
- (France) Néri Valdes

=== Pairs ===
Rank	Name	Places
1	(West Germany) Marika Kilius / Hans-Jürgen Bäumler	15
2	(Soviet Union) Lyudmila Belousova / Oleg Protopopov	19
3	(West Germany) Margret Göbl / Franz Ningel	20
4	(Switzerland) Gerda Johner / Rüdi Johner	37
5	(East Germany) Irene Müller / Hans-Georg Dallmer	47
6	(East Germany) Brigitte Wokoeck / Heinz-Ulrich Walther	63
7	(Czechoslovakia) Milada Kubíková / Jaroslav Votruba	68
8	(Austria) Diana Hinko / Bernhard Henhappel	69
9	(West Germany) Rita Blumenberg / Werner Mensching	73
10	(Norway) Liv Lunde / Erik Grünert	93
11	(Switzerland) Jacqueline Steiner / Jean-Pierre Külling	97
12	(United Kingdom) Vera Jeffery / Peter Webb	101

Judges were

- (Hungary) Zoltán Balázs
- (East Germany) Ernst K. Bauch
- (Norway) Christen Christensen
- (United Kingdom) Pamela Davis
- (Austria) Walter Malek
- (Czechoslovakia) Emil Skákala
- (Switzerland) Rolf J. Steinmann
- (Soviet Union) Tatyana Tolmachova
- (West Germany) Adolf Walker

=== Ice dance ===
Rank	Name	Places
1	(France) Christiane Guhel / Jean Guhel	10
2	(United Kingdom) Linda Shearman / Michael Philipps	12
3	(Czechoslovakia) Eva Romanová / Pavel Roman	21
4	(United Kingdom) Mary Parry / Roy Mason	27
5	(United Kingdom) Anne Cross / Francis Williams	36
6	(West Germany) Helga Burkhardt / Hannes Burkhardt	46
7	(Italy) Olga Gilardi / Germano Ceccattini	46
8	(Switzerland) Marlyse Fornachon / Charly Pichard	61
9	(Czechoslovakia) Jitka Babická / Jaromír Holan	65
10	(France) Armelle Flichy / Pierre Brun	72
11	(West Germany) Gabriele Rauch / Rudi Matysik	79
12	(Hungary) Györgyi Korda / Pál Vásárhelyi	80
13	(Austria) Christel Trebesiner / Georg Felsinger	85
14	(Italy) Maria Toncelli / Vinicio Toncelli	95

Judges were

- (Hungary) Zoltán Balázs
- (Italy) Cia Benacchi-Bordogna
- (United Kingdom) Pamela Davis
- (Switzerland) Eugen Kirchhofer
- (France) L. Lauret
- (Czechoslovakia) Emil Skákala
- (West Germany) Hermann Wollersen
