= Heidemarie Steiner =

German figure skater

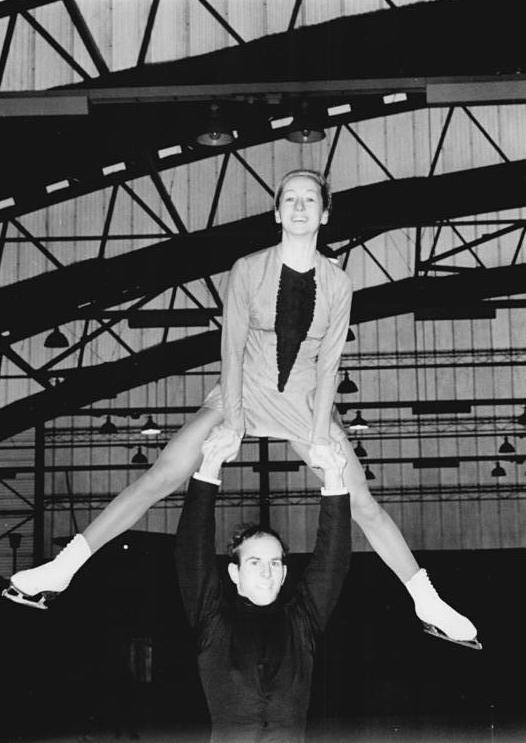
- Heidi Steiner with Heinz-Ulrich Walther in 1966

Personal information
- Born: 9 May 1944 (age 82) Kolberg, Pommern, Germany
- Height: 162 cm (5 ft 4 in)

Figure skating career
- Country: East Germany
- Skating club: SC Dynamo Berlin
- Retired: 1970
Medal record
Representing East Germany
Pairs' Figure skating
World Championships
Bronze medal – third place	1970 Ljubljana	Pairs
European Championships
Bronze medal – third place	1970 Leningrad	Pairs
Bronze medal – third place	1968 Västerås	Pairs
Bronze medal – third place	1967 Ljubljana	Pairs

Heidemarie Steiner married Walther, (born 9 May 1944 in Kolberg, Province of Pomerania) is a German figure skating coach and former competitor. She competed in pair skating and ladies singles.

Steiner began as a single skater. But when she dropped behind fellow East German Gabriele Seyfert, she wanted to retire early.

However, she changed to pair skating and teamed up with Heinz-Ulrich Walther, who also became her husband in 1969. Their greatest success was winning the bronze medal at the 1970 World Championships in Ljubljana. The pair trained at the SC Dynamo Berlin club and represented East Germany. Their coach was Heinz-Friedrich Lindner.

After she retired, she became figure skating coach at the SC Dynamo Berlin club (today SC Berlin). She has coached Romy Kermer & Rolf Österreich, Birgit Lorenz & Knut Schubert, Babette Preußler & Tobias Schöter and Peggy Schwarz & Alexander König, among others. She later coached Swiss couple Leslie Monod & Cedric Monod. She also worked as a choreographer for this couple.

Today she lives in Berlin with her husband Heinz-Ulrich Walther.

== Results ==
=== Ladies' singles ===
International
Event	1960	1961	1962	1963
European Championships	26th	23rd		
National
East German Championships	1st	3rd	2nd	2nd

=== Pairs with Walther ===
International
Event	65–66	66–67	67–68	68–69	69–70
Winter Olympics			4th		
World Champ.	9th	5th	5th	5th	3rd
European Champ.	8th	3rd	3rd	4th	3rd
Prague Skate		3rd			
National
East Germany	1st	1st	2nd	1st	1st

== See also ==
- SV Dynamo
