= 1967 European Figure Skating Championships =

Figure skating competition

1967 European Championships
- Type: ISU Championship
- Season: 1966-67
- Location: (Socialist Federal Republic of Yugoslavia) Ljubljana, Slovenia, Yugoslavia
- Venue: Tivoli Hall

Champions
- Men's singles: (Austria) Emmerich Danzer
- Ladies' singles: (East Germany) Gabriele Seyfert
- Pairs: (Soviet Union) Lyudmila Belousova / Oleg Protopopov
- Ice dance: (United Kingdom) Diane Towler / Bernard Ford
- Previous: 1966 European Championships
- Next: 1968 European Championships

The 1967 European Figure Skating Championships were held in Ljubljana, Yugoslavia. Elite senior-level figure skaters from European ISU member nations competed for the title of European Champion in the disciplines of men's singles, ladies' singles, pair skating, and ice dancing.

== Results ==
=== Men ===
Rank	Name	Places
1	(Austria) Emmerich Danzer	
2	(Austria) Wolfgang Schwarz	
3	(Czechoslovakia) Ondrej Nepela	
4	(France) Patrick Péra	
5	(Soviet Union) Sergey Chetverukhin	
6	(France) Robert Dureville	
7	(East Germany) Günter Zöller	
8	(West Germany) Peter Krick	
9	(France) Philippe Pélissier	
10	(Czechoslovakia) Marian Filc	
11	(Austria) Günter Anderl	
12	(Hungary) Jenő Ébert	
13	(United Kingdom) Michael Williams	
14	(West Germany) Jürgen Eberwein	
15	(Czechoslovakia) Josef Tůma	
16	(Poland) Zdzisław Pieńkowski	
17	(Switzerland) Daniel Höner	
18	(East Germany) Reinhard Mirmseker	
19	(Sweden) Tony Berntler	
20	(Denmark) Arne Hoffmann	

=== Ladies ===
Rank	Name	Places
1	(East Germany) Gabriele Seyfert	
2	(Czechoslovakia) Hana Mašková	
3	(Hungary) Zsuzsa Almássy	31
4	(United Kingdom) Sally-Anne Stapleford	
5	(Austria) Beatrix Schuba	
6	(West Germany) Monika Feldmann	
7	(Austria) Elisabeth Mikula	
8	(Soviet Union) Yelena Shcheglova	
9	(West Germany) Petra Ruhrmann	
10	(East Germany) Beate Richter	
11	(Hungary) Zsuzsa Szentmiklóssy	
12	(France) Sylvaine Duban	
13	(United Kingdom) Linda Davis	
14	(East Germany) Martina Clausner	
15	(Italy) Rita Trapanese	
16	(Czechoslovakia) Marie Víchová	
17	(France) Micheline Joubert	
18	(Czechoslovakia) Eva Gašparcová	
19	(Sweden) Britt Elfving	
20	(Switzerland) Pia Zürcher	
21	(Poland) Barbara Warmińska	
22	(Denmark) Jette Vad	
23	(Socialist Federal Republic of Yugoslavia) Katjuša Derenda	
24	(Romania) Elena Mois	

=== Pairs ===
Rank	Name	Places
1	(Soviet Union) Lyudmila Belousova / Oleg Protopopov	
2	(West Germany) Margot Glockshuber / Wolfgang Danne	
3	(East Germany) Heidemarie Steiner / Heinz-Ulrich Walther	
4	(West Germany) Gudrun Hauss / Walter Häfner	
5	(Soviet Union) Tatyana Sharanova / Anatoliy Yevdokimov	
6	(Soviet Union) Tamara Moskvina / Aleksey Mishin	
7	(East Germany) Brigitte Weise / Michael Brychy	
8	(Poland) Janina Poremska / Piotr Szczypa	
9	(Czechoslovakia) Bohunka Šrámková / Jan Šrámek	
10	(Switzerland) Monique Mathys / Yves Ällig	
11	(West Germany) Marianne Streifler / Herbert Wiesinger	
12	(East Germany) Irene Müller / Hans-Georg Dallmer	
13	(Austria) Evelyne Schneider / Wilhelm Bietak	
14	(Switzerland) Mónika Szabó / Péter Szabó	
15	(United Kingdom) Linda Bernard / Raymond Wilson	
16	(Socialist Federal Republic of Yugoslavia) Anci Dolenc / Mitja Sketa	
17	(Norway) Anikken Støa / Erik Grünert	

=== Ice dance ===
Rank	Name	Places
1	(United Kingdom) Diane Towler / Bernard Ford	
2	(United Kingdom) Yvonne Suddick / Malcolm Cannon	
3	(France) Brigitte Martin / Francis Gamichon	
4	(United Kingdom) Janet Sawbridge / Jon Lane	
5	(West Germany) Gabriele Matysik / Rudi Matysik	
6	(Czechoslovakia) Jitka Babická / Jaromír Holan	
7	(East Germany) Annerose Baier / Eberhard Rüger	
8	(Soviet Union) Irina Grishkova / Viktor Ryzhkin	
9	(Hungary) Edit Mató / Károly Csanádi	
10	(Soviet Union) Lyudmila Pakhomova / Aleksandr Gorshkov	
11	(Czechoslovakia) Dana Novotná / Jaroslav Hainz	
12	(Czechoslovakia) Milena Tůmová / Josef Pešek	
13	(Austria) Heide Mezger / Herbert Rothkappel	
14	(Italy) Susanna Carpani / Sergio Pirelli	
15	(Hungary) Ilona Berecz / István Sugár	
16	(East Germany) Norma Allwelt / Michael Schmidt	
17	(Netherlands) Truusje Geradts / Ronald du Burck	
18	(West Germany) Angelika Trojahn / Joachim Metz	
