= Sabine Baeß =

German pair skater

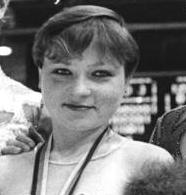
- Sabine Baeß, 1983

Personal information
- Born: 15 March 1961 (age 65) Dresden, Bezirk Dresden, East Germany
- Height: 5 ft 0.5 in (154 cm)

Figure skating career
- Country: East Germany
- Retired: 1984
Medal record
Representing East Germany
Pair skating
World Championships
Gold medal – first place	1982 Copenhagen	Pairs
Silver medal – second place	1981 Hartford	Pairs
Silver medal – second place	1983 Helsinki	Pairs
Bronze medal – third place	1979 Vienna	Pairs
Bronze medal – third place	1984 Ottawa	Pairs
European Championships
Gold medal – first place	1982 Lyon	Pairs
Gold medal – first place	1983 Dortmund	Pairs
Silver medal – second place	1984 Budapest	Pairs
Bronze medal – third place	1979 Zagreb	Pairs

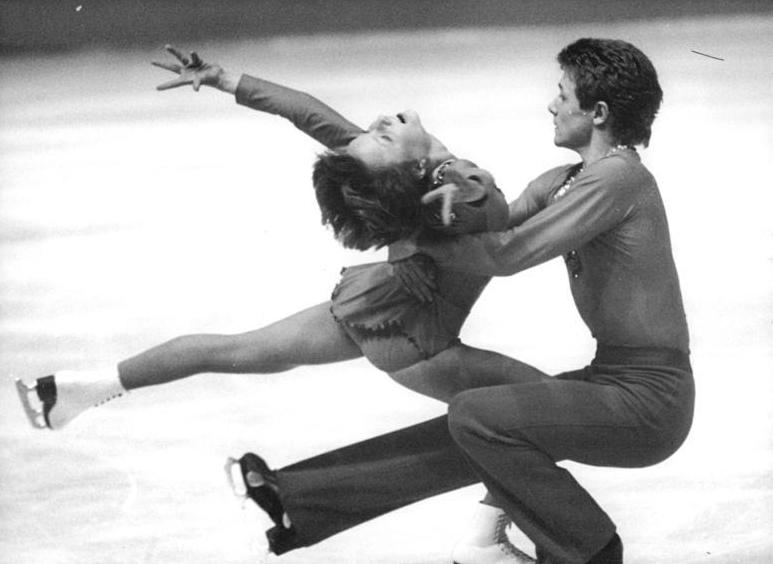
Sabine Baeß and Tassilo Thierbach in Karl-Marx-Stadt, 1979

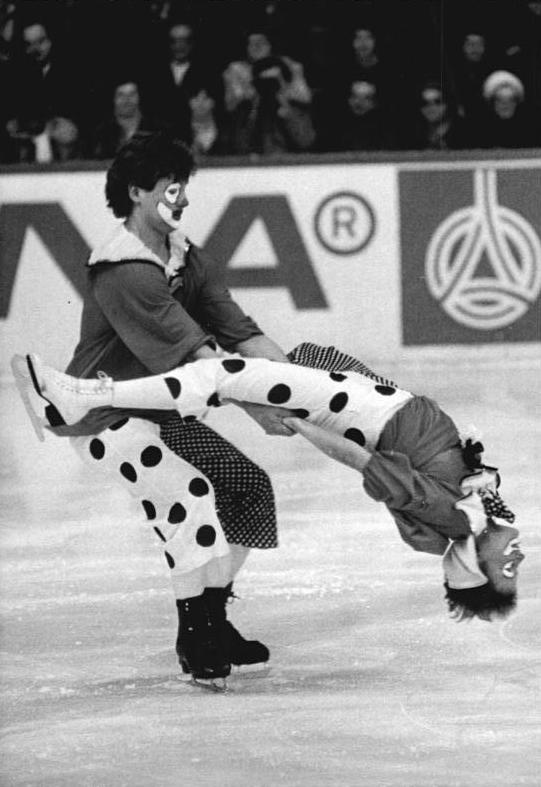
Sabine Baeß and Tassilo Thierbach in Karl-Marx-Stadt, 1983

Sabine Marbach, known professionally by her maiden name, Baeß, (born 15 March 1961) is a German former pair skater. With her partner Tassilo Thierbach, she is the 1982 World champion and a two-time European champion (1982, 1983).

== Career ==
Baeß/Thierbach were coached by Irene Salzmann in Karl-Marx-Stadt (now Chemnitz) and represented the club SC Karl-Marx-Stadt. They were the only figure skating pair representing East Germany to win the World or European championships.

They won their first European Championship, a bronze, in 1977 and their first World Championship medal, a bronze, in 1979. A mistake in the short program took them out of any chance of a medal at the 1980 Winter Olympics in Lake Placid however, and they came in fifth overall.

Baeß/Thierbach had to skip the 1981 Nationals and Europeans due to Thierbach's meniscus surgery in 1980. They were however able to return to the Worlds in Hartford where they won a silver medal.

They won both Europeans and Worlds in 1982, defeating the Soviet Union, on the basis of huge throws and consistency. They defended their European titles in 1983 but despite two clean programs were beaten by Russian newcomers Elena Valova and Oleg Vassiliev, who they had just defeated at the Europeans and led after the short program here. This was a controversial result to many people, as Elena put her hands down on a throw.

They finished in second place, again to Valova & Vasiliev at the 1984 Europeans but went into the Sarajevo Olympics as one of the favorites for the gold medal. A major mistake on an attempted double loop in the short program put them in fourth place though, and some more mistakes in the long program kept them just off the podium in fourth place overall. At their final Worlds in Ottawa they again had a significant problem in the short program, but were able to skate a stronger long program than the Olympics to climb from 4th to a bronze medal.

After 1990 (the year of the German reunification), Baeß performed in ice shows with Tobias Schröter, a former East German champion in pair skating. They appeared in Friedrichstadtpalast in Berlin. Baeß later began working as a figure skating coach in Berlin at the club TSC Berlin.

== Skating style ==
Sabine and Tassilo were best known for their huge, consistent, and difficult throws. They were one of the first pairs to regularly do the throw triple loop, and also regularly performed a throw triple toe loop. They were an all around strong technical team with strong lifts, death spirals, side by side jumps, and a triple twist. They were less strong on the artistic side of the sport.

== Personal life ==
Baeß married Olaf Marbach and has a son named Moritz. She lives in Berlin and works in health care.

== Results ==
Pairs with Thierbach

Event	1975-76	1976-77	1977-78	1978-79	1979-80	1980-81	1981-82	1982-83	1983-84
Winter Olympics					6th				4th
World Championships			5th	3rd	4th	2nd	1st	2nd	3rd
European Championships		5th	4th	3rd	4th		1st	1st	2nd
Blue Swords			2nd	1st	1st				
Golden Spin of Zagreb			1st	1st					
Skate America					1st				
National
East German Championships	3rd	3rd	2nd	1st	1st		1st	1st	1st
