= René Lohse =

German ice dancer

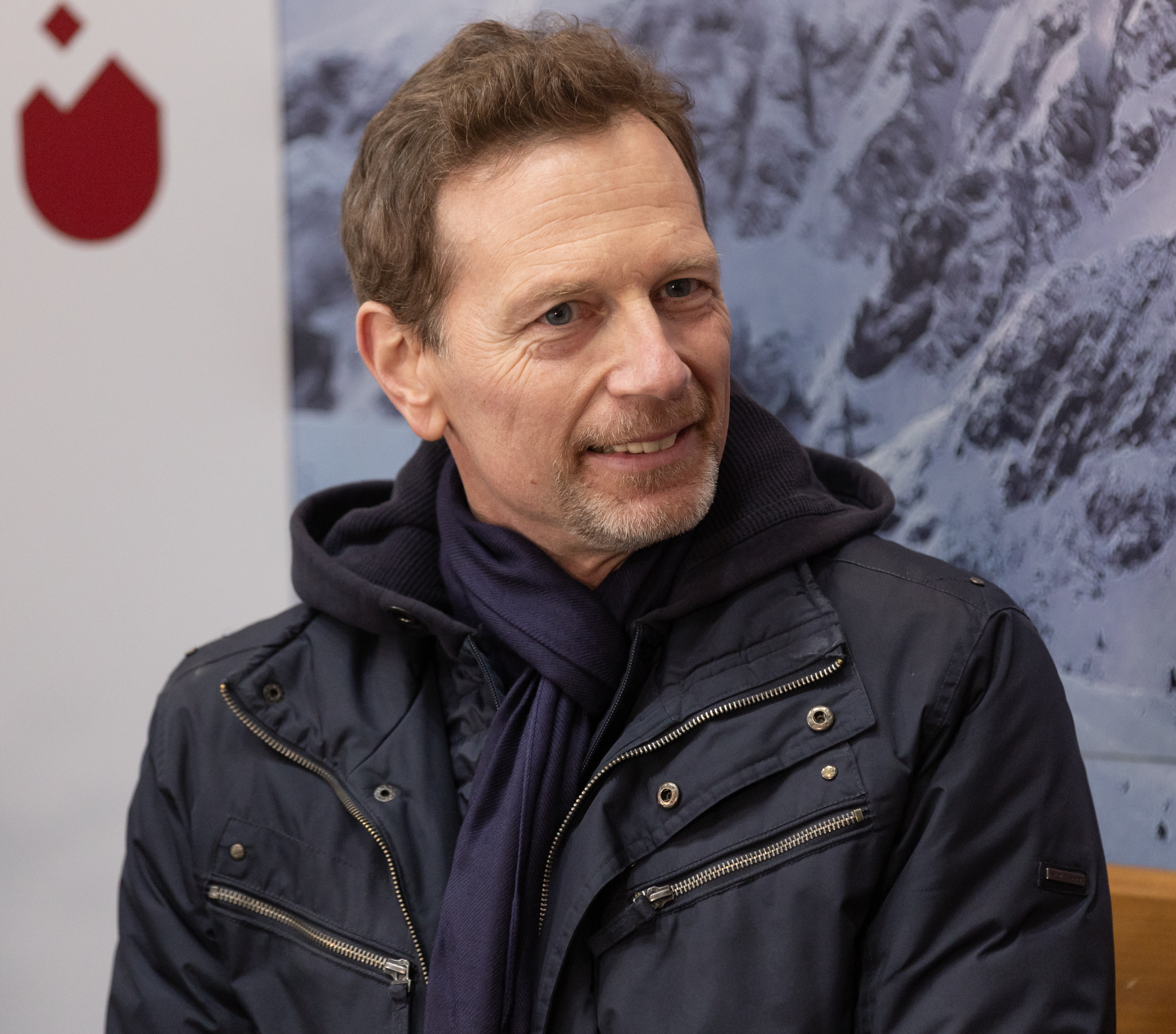

Personal information
- Born: 23 September 1973 (age 52) East Berlin, East Germany
- Height: 1.83 m (6 ft 0 in)

Figure skating career
- Country: Germany; East Germany
- Partner: Kati Winkler
- Skating club: SC Berlin
- Retired: 2004
Medal record
Figure skating
Ice dancing
Representing Germany
World Championships
| Bronze medal – third place | 2004 Dortmund | Ice dancing |

René Lohse, married Sachtler-Lohse (born 23 September 1973) is a German former competitive ice dancer. With partner Kati Winkler, he is the 2004 World bronze medalist and a six-time German national champion. They competed at two Winter Olympics, in 1998 and 2002.

== Personal life ==
René Lohse was born in East Berlin to Michael and Alrun Lohse. He has one brother, Rico, and one sister, Romy. Lohse studied physical education at Humboldt University in Berlin. His profession is Sport- and Tourist manager. He is married to former figure skater Anne Sachtler. His son, Linus Gabriel, was born in May 2011.

== Career ==
Lohse started skating at the age of four in East Berlin after being selected for the sport in kindergarten. At first he was a single skater and was coached by Romy Kermer. In 1983, he changed coaches to Jürgen Bertko.

At the age of 12, he left skating for other sports but two years later Kati Winkler asked him to take up ice dancing with her. They were the first East German ice dancers in years, the discipline having disappeared over the previous 18 years. Until 1996 they were coached by Knut Schubert whose expertise was more in pair skating. In 1996 they moved to Oberstdorf in Bavaria and changed their coach to Martin Skotnicky. However Winkler/Lohse always skated for the club SC Berlin (earlier SC Dynamo Berlin). They were both sergeants in the German Army's sports division, which sponsored their skating.

In 1999-2000, Winkler and Lohse's free dance was entitled "Time Goes Millennium", which included techno-style music with ticking sounds, clock images created by their arms and legs repeatedly mimicking clock hands, a rhythmically swinging lift in which Winkler represented a pendulum, and both skaters listening to and looking at wristwatches while walking briskly on the ice. Their moves, except for the lifts, were mostly performed in parallel to each other, with both skaters executing similar images.

In 2000-01, Winkler and Lohse became the first German ice dance team to qualify for the Grand Prix Final, where they finished fifth. They missed most of the 2001-02 season after Lohse fell in practice at the 2001 Sparkassen Cup, injuring the meniscus and ligaments in his knee. They returned in time for the Olympics where they finished 8th. In the summer of 2002, Lohse collided with a truck while he was riding his bike in Oberstdorf, "I went over the handlebars and fell on my shoulder. The bone was sticking up straight through my shoulder where I cut three ligaments." He recovered in time for them to compete in a pair of Grand Prix events and qualify for the Grand Prix Final. However, they were unable to compete in the Final because Winkler had influenza and Lohse a muscle injury in his leg.

They missed the 2003 World Championships due to injury and also the 2004 European Championships after Lohse reinjured his knee ligaments a few days prior to the event. They recovered in time for the 2004 World Championships where they won the bronze medal. This was the greatest German success in ice dancing since 1973, the time of Angelika Buck/Erich Buck. They retired from competition after the event.

Winkler and Lohse skated in ice shows following the end of their competitive career. Lohse coaches in Berlin and has joined the German Army, which sponsors skating.

== Programs ==
(With Winkler)

| Season | Original dance | Free dance | Exhibition |
|---|---|---|---|
| 2005–2006 | | | The Mask Story of my life by Neil Diamond Power Percussion by Power Percussion |
| 2004–2005 | | | Turn me on by Norah Jones Just dream by Thomas Anders: They remind me to much of you; Twenty flight Rock; Hallelujah, I love her so; She's the most by Dick Brave and the Backbeats |
| 2003–2004 | Memories of the Grand Ball: Swing: Rhythm composed by Casey Mac Gill, Michael Gruber performed by Everett Bradley & Company; Blues: The Blues in the Night composed by Julie London; Jive: Stuff Like That There composed by Livingston, Evans, Goldsen performed by Bette Midler | Day and Night: Earth Song by Michael Jackson; Chiquitan composed by Martinez, Vigoer, Tarkin, Mugato, McFloyd performed by La Bomba feat. Los Primos; The White Spirit composed by Uman (Didier Jean / Danielle Jean) performed by D&D Jean; Lo-Lo Dzama by Sum Svistu | Scatmambo by Scatman John |
| 2002–2003 | Frau Luna: March: Laßt den Kopf nicht hängen; Waltz: Schlösser, die im Monde liegen; Polka: Berliner Luft; by Paul Lincke | Energy: Crazy Benny composed by M.Friis, U.Savery, M.Parsberg performed by Safri Duo; Private Investigations composed by Mark Knopfler performed by Dire Straits; Played-A-Life composed by M.Friis, U.Savery, M.Parsberg performed by Safri Duo | |
| 2001–2002 | Spanish tango and flamenco: Habanera from Carmen by Georges Bizet performed by Nana Mouskouri; Malaguena guitars and castanets of Diego Sacromonte | Ragtime – Music of Scott Joplin: Maple Leaf Rag; Sunflower Slow Drag; 12th Street Rag | Flamenco; Schuh des Manitu soundtrack |
| 2000–2001 | Cabaret: Charleston: The Hot Honey Rag by Ralph Burns and Douglas Bestermann Orchestra; Quickstep: Cabaret from the Cabaret Revue | Gospel-Message Of Hope: Go Down Moses by Louis Armstrong; Higher And Higher by The Harlem Gospel Singers; How Great Thou Art; Swing Low Sweet Chariot both performed by Joan Orleans (original by Mahalia Jackson) | Cabaret Paraiso perdido by DJ DERO |
| 1999–2000 | Samba: Le Serpent from the CD "Le Chant du Monde"; Rumba: Ya Los Se Que Te Vas from the CD "Cosas de Enamorados"; Mambo: Lo-Lo Dzama from the CD "Casa Musica" | Time goes Millennium: Noman's Land from the movie "Pi"; Insomnia from the CD "Faithless" Reverence; Rachel's Song from the movie "Bladerunner" by Vangelis; S.P. Project from the CD "DP Deejay Parade"; Additional sound effects, instruments by Meilhaus-Munich Studio | Europe by Santana Super Trouper by A-Teens |
| 1998–1999 | Waltz: L'homme de Paris by Mireille Mathieu composed by Walter/Delancray/Simille performed by Christian Gaubert | Yin and Yang: Korean dance and drum company; The yellow emperor and the pope composed and arranged by Chris Hinze; Spring in Lhasa by Oliver Shanti from "Tai Chi Too"; One world, one voice by Leningrad Orchestra and Kodo Drummers | Vivo per lei by Andrea Bocelli From the musical Grease: Sandy; Greased Lightning; We go together |
| 1997–1998 | Jive: Stuff like that by Bette Midler (from "For The Boys") | Romeo and Juliet by Sergei Prokofiev | Space by Yello |
| 1996–1997 | Tango Argentino: Orgullo Criollo; Canaro en Paris by Sexteto Mayor | Take Five by Paul Desmond; Dave Brubeck Orchestra | Drill Instructor by Captain Jack You must love me by Madonna Fitze, Fitze, Fatze by Helge Schneider |
| 1995–1996 | Paso doble: Malaguena | Mambo Number 8; Historia de un Amor; El Mambo | |
| 1994–1995 | Quickstep: Ich wollt', ich wär' ein Huhn | Jazz medley from the movie "Casablanca" | Beauty And The Beast |
| 1993–1994 | Rhumba: Composition: by Overlight-Studio Berlin, Thomas Kurzhals | Yello, Kenny G. - saxophone, Yello | |
| 1992–1993 | Viennese Waltz: Geschichten aus dem Wienerwald by Strauß | Barcelona Nights | |
| 1991–1992 | Polka: Kutschke-Polka (old Berlin song) | Starlight Express | |
| 1990–1991 | Blues by John Lee Hooker | Starlight Express | |
| 1989–1990 | Samba: Tropic Trumpets | Rhumba and Jive: Schwarze Augen | |

== Results ==
(ice dance with Kati Winkler)

International
| Event | 1989–90 | 1990–91 | 1991–92 | 1992–93 | 1993–94 | 1994–95 | 1995–96 | 1996–97 | 1997–98 | 1998–99 | 1999–00 | 2000–01 | 2001–02 | 2002–03 | 2003–04 |
|---|---|---|---|---|---|---|---|---|---|---|---|---|---|---|---|
| Olympics | | | | | | | | | 10th | | | | 8th | | |
| Worlds | | | | | | 19th | 13th | 12th | 9th | 7th | 6th | 7th | 7th | | 3rd |
| Europeans | | | | 16th | | 15th | 9th | | 9th | 6th | 5th | 6th | | 5th | |
| Grand Prix Final | | | | | | | | | | | | 5th | | | |
| Cup of Russia | | | | | | | | | | | | | | 4th | 4th |
| Lalique | | | | | | | | 5th | | | | 3rd | | | |
| Nations Cup | | | | | 9th | 6th | 6th | 7th | 5th | 3rd | 2nd | 4th | | 3rd | 2nd |
| NHK Trophy | | | | | | | | | | 4th | | 3rd | | 2nd | 4th |
| Skate America | | | | | | 4th | 7th | 6th | | | 4th | | | | |
| Skate Canada | | | | | | | 9th | | | | | | | | |
| Nebelhorn | | | | | | 4th | | | | | | | | | |
International: Junior
| Junior Worlds | | 15th | 8th | | | | | | | | | | | | |
National
| German Champ. | | | 2nd | 2nd | 3rd | 2nd | 1st | | 1st | 1st | 1st | | | 1st | 1st |
| East German | 1st | | | | | | | | | | | | | | |
