= Tassilo Thierbach =

German pair skater (1956–2025)

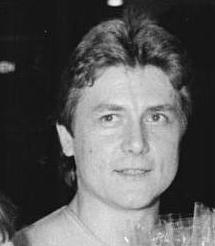
- Tassilo Thierbach, 1982

Personal information
- Born: 21 May 1956 Karl-Marx-Stadt, East Germany
- Died: 19 April 2025 (aged 68) Chemnitz, Saxony, Germany
- Height: 5 ft 6.5 in (169 cm)

Figure skating career
- Country: East Germany
- Retired: 1984
Medal record
Representing East Germany
Pairs' Figure skating
World Championships
Bronze medal – third place	1984 Ottawa	Pairs
Silver medal – second place	1983 Helsinki	Pairs
Gold medal – first place	1982 Copenhagen	Pairs
Silver medal – second place	1981 Hartford	Pairs
Bronze medal – third place	1979 Vienna	Pairs
European Championships
Silver medal – second place	1984 Budapest	Pairs
Gold medal – first place	1983 Dortmund	Pairs
Gold medal – first place	1982 Lyon	Pairs
Bronze medal – third place	1979 Zagreb	Pairs

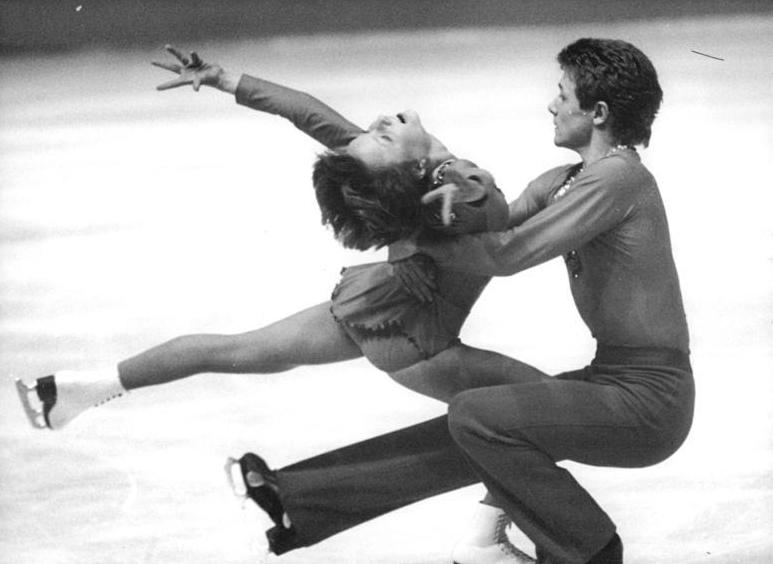
Sabine Baeß and Tassilo Thierbach in Karl-Marx-Stadt, 1979

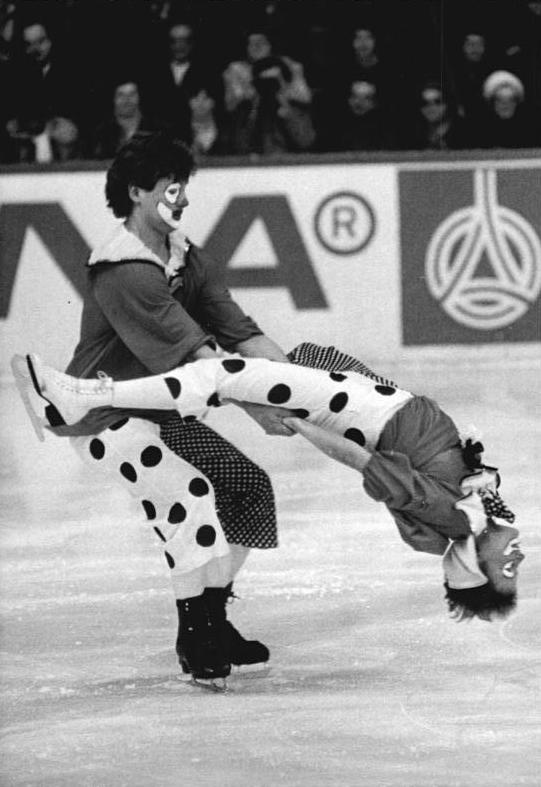
Sabine Baeß and Tassilo Thierbach in Karl-Marx-Stadt, 1983

Tassilo Thierbach (21 May 1956 – 19 April 2025) was a German pair skater. With partner Sabine Baeß, he was the 1982 World champion and a two-time European champion (1982, 1983).

== Biography ==
Baeß and Thierbach were coached by Irene Salzmann in Karl-Marx-Stadt (today Chemnitz) and represented the club SC Karl-Marx-Stadt. They were the only figure skating pair representing East Germany to win the World or European championships.

All together, Thierbach skated with five partners: Romy Kermer (silver medallist at the Olympic Games with Rolf Österreich in 1976); Antje Heck; Petra Ronge; Sylvia Walter; and finally Sabine Baeß.

Baeß and Thierbach won their first European Championship, a bronze, in 1977 and their first World Championship medal, a bronze, in 1979. A mistake in the short program took them out of any chance of a medal at the 1980 Winter Olympics in Lake Placid however, and they came in fifth overall.

They won both Europeans and Worlds in 1982, defeating the Soviet Union, on the basis of huge throws and consistency. They defended their European titles in 1983 but despite two clean programs at that year's World Championships were beaten by Russian newcomers Elena Valova and Oleg Vassiliev, whom they had just defeated at the Europeans and led after the short program here. This was a controversial result to many people as Elena put her hands down on a throw.

In 1980 he suffered a meniscus injury to his knee, for which surgery was necessary. For this reason Baeß and Thierbach had to miss the Nationals and the Europeans in 1981. They came in fourth place at the Sarajevo Olympics.

From 1977 to 1989, he was a Stasi informer under the codename "Gehrhard".

Thierbach ran the company Automaten Großaufstellung Tassilo Thierbach GmbH in Chemnitz. He also worked as figure skating coach in collaboration with Ingo Steuer in Chemnitz.

Thierbach died in Chemnitz on 19 April 2025, at the age of 68.

== Results ==
=== With Baeß ===
Event	1975-76	1976-77	1977-78	1978-79	1979-80	1980-81	1981-82	1982-83	1983-84
Winter Olympics					6th				4th
World Championships			5th	3rd	4th	2nd	1st	2nd	3rd
European Championships		5th	4th	3rd	4th		1st	1st	2nd
East German Championships	3rd	3rd	2nd	1st	1st		1st	1st	1st
Skate America					1st				

=== With Heck ===
- 1973 East German Championships: Bronze medalist with Antje Heck

== Sources ==
- Tassilo Thierbach at Olympics at Sports-Reference.com (archived)
