= Veit Kempe =

German pair skater

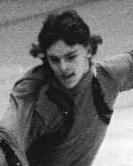
- Veit Kempe, 1974

Personal information
- Born: 27 October 1955 (age 70) Dresden, Sachsen, East Germany
- Height: 6 ft 2 in (188 cm)

Figure skating career
- Country: East Germany
- Partner: Kerstin Stolfig; Sylvia Konzack
- Skating club: SC Dynamo Berlin

Veit Kempe (born 27 October 1955 in Dresden, Sachsen) is a German former pair skater who represented East Germany. He is best known for his partnership with Kerstin Stolfig. The pair placed sixth at the 1976 Winter Olympics and became two-time East German national silver medalists.

Earlier in his career, Kempe competed with Sylvia Konzack.

== Results ==
=== With Stolfig ===
International
Event	74–75	75–76	76–77	77–78	78–79	79–80
Winter Olympics		6th				
World Championships	7th	7th			10th	
European Champ.	7th	6th		6th	5th	7th
Prize of Moscow News	2nd					
National
East German Champ.	3rd		2nd	3rd	2nd	3rd

=== With Konzack ===
International
Event	1971–72	1972–73
Blue Swords	4th	4th
Prize of Moscow News	8th	
