= Kati Winkler =

German ice dancer

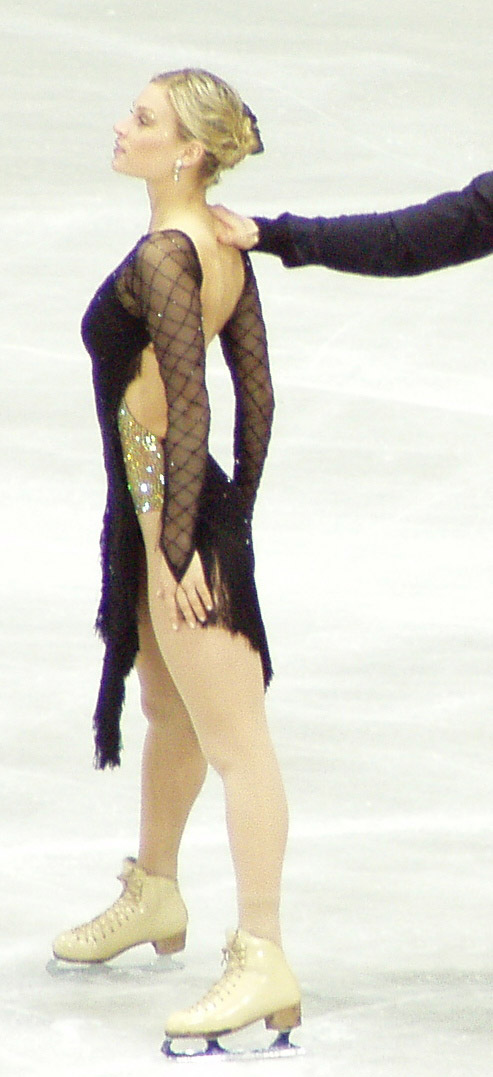
- Winkler during the compulsory dance at 2004 Worlds in Dortmund

Personal information
- Born: 16 January 1974 (age 52) Karl-Marx-Stadt, East Germany
- Height: 1.70 m (5 ft 7 in)

Figure skating career
- Country: Germany; East Germany
- Partner: René Lohse
- Skating club: SC Berlin
- Retired: 2004
Medal record
Figure skating
Ice dancing
Representing Germany
World Championships
Bronze medal – third place	2004 Dortmund	Ice dancing

Kati Winkler (born 16 January 1974) is a German former competitive ice dancer. With partner René Lohse, she is the 2004 World bronze medalist and a six-time German national champion. They competed at two Winter Olympics, in 1998 and 2002.

== Personal life ==
Kati Winkler was born in Karl-Marx-Stadt (now Chemnitz) to Bernd Winkler and Christina Schmerbach and has a sister. She is a skilled clerk.

== Career ==
Winkler started skating at the age of four after being selected for the sport in kindergarten. At first, she was a single skater and was coached by Peter Meyer. While still a single skater, she moved to Berlin in 1985 and was coached by Jürgen Bertko there.

A back problem hampered her jumping ability, so at the age of 14, she decided to take up ice dancing and asked Lohse to be her partner. They were the first East German ice dancers in years, the discipline having disappeared over the previous 18 years. Until 1996 they were coached by Knut Schubert whose expertise was more in pair skating. In 1996 they moved to Oberstdorf in Bavaria and changed their coach to Martin Skotnicky. However Winkler/Lohse always skated for the club SC Berlin (earlier SC Dynamo Berlin). They were both sergeants in the German Army's sports division, which sponsored their skating.

In 1999-2000, Winkler and Lohse's free dance was entitled "Time Goes Millennium", which included techno-style music with ticking sounds, clock images created by their arms and legs repeatedly mimicking clock hands, a rhythmically swinging lift in which Winkler represented a pendulum, and both skaters listening to and looking at wristwatches while walking briskly on the ice. Their moves, except for the lifts, were mostly performed in parallel to each other, with both skaters executing similar images.

In 2000-01, Winkler and Lohse became the first German ice dance team to qualify for the Grand Prix Final, where they finished fifth. They missed most of the 2001-02 season after Lohse fell in practice at the 2001 Sparkassen Cup, injuring the meniscus and ligaments in his knee. They returned in time for the Olympics, where they finished 8th. In the summer of 2002, Lohse collided with a truck while he was riding his bike in Oberstdorf. "I went over the handlebars and fell on my shoulder. The bone was sticking up straight through my shoulder, where I cut three ligaments." He recovered in time for them to compete in a pair of Grand Prix events and qualify for the Grand Prix Final. However, they were unable to compete in the Final because Winkler had influenza and Lohse had a muscle injury in his leg.

They missed the 2003 World Championships due to injury and also the 2004 European Championships after Lohse reinjured his knee ligaments a few days before the event. They recovered in time for the 2004 World Championships, where they won the bronze medal. This was the greatest German success in ice dancing since 1973, the time of Angelika Buck/Erich Buck. They retired from competition after the event.

Winkler worked as a choreographer for Christina Beier and William Beier, the German champions in ice dancing. Winkler and Lohse skated in ice shows following the end of their competitive career.

== Programs ==
(With Lohse)

Season	Original dance	Free dance	Exhibition
2005–2006			The Mask Story of my life by Neil Diamond Power Percussion by Power Percussion
2004–2005			Turn me on by Norah Jones Just dream by Thomas Anders: They remind me to much of you; Twenty flight Rock; Hallelujah, I love her so; She's the most by Dick Brave and the Backbeats
2003–2004	Memories of the Grand Ball: Swing: Rhythm composed by Casey Mac Gill, Michael Gruber performed by Everett Bradley & Company; Blues: The Blues in the Night composed by Julie London; Jive: Stuff Like That There composed by Livingston, Evans, Goldsen performed by Bette Midler	Day and Night: Earth Song by Michael Jackson; Chiquitan composed by Martinez, Vigoer, Tarkin, Mugato, McFloyd performed by La Bomba feat. Los Primos; The White Spirit composed by Uman (Didier Jean / Danielle Jean) performed by D&D Jean; Lo-Lo Dzama by Sum Svistu	Scatmambo by Scatman John
2002–2003	Frau Luna: March: Laßt den Kopf nicht hängen; Waltz: Schlösser, die im Monde liegen; Polka: Berliner Luft; by Paul Lincke	Energy: Crazy Benny composed by M.Friis, U.Savery, M.Parsberg performed by Safri Duo; Private Investigations composed by Mark Knopfler performed by Dire Straits; Played-A-Life composed by M.Friis, U.Savery, M.Parsberg performed by Safri Duo	
2001–2002	Spanish tango and flamenco: Habanera from Carmen by Georges Bizet performed by Nana Mouskouri; Malaguena guitars and castanets of Diego Sacromonte	Ragtime – Music of Scott Joplin: Maple Leaf Rag; Sunflower Slow Drag; 12th Street Rag	Flamenco; Schuh des Manitu soundtrack
2000–2001	Cabaret: Charleston: The Hot Honey Rag by Ralph Burns and Douglas Bestermann Orchestra; Quickstep: Cabaret from the Cabaret Revue	Gospel-Message Of Hope: Go Down Moses by Louis Armstrong; Higher And Higher by The Harlem Gospel Singers; How Great Thou Art; Swing Low Sweet Chariot both performed by Joan Orleans (original by Mahalia Jackson)	Cabaret Paraiso perdido by DJ DERO
1999–2000	Samba: Le Serpent from the CD "Le Chant du Monde"; Rumba: Ya Los Se Que Te Vas from the CD "Cosas de Enamorados"; Mambo: Lo-Lo Dzama from the CD "Casa Musica"	Time goes Millennium: Noman's Land from the movie "Pi"; Insomnia from the CD "Faithless" Reverence; Rachel's Song from the movie "Bladerunner" by Vangelis; S.P. Project from the CD "DP Deejay Parade"; Additional sound effects, instruments by Meilhaus-Munich Studio	Europe by Santana Super Trouper by A-Teens
1998–1999	Waltz: L'homme de Paris by Mireille Mathieu composed by Walter/Delancray/Simille performed by Christian Gaubert	Yin and Yang: Korean dance and drum company; The yellow emperor and the pope composed and arranged by Chris Hinze; Spring in Lhasa by Oliver Shanti from "Tai Chi Too"; One world, one voice by Leningrad Orchestra and Kodo Drummers	Vivo per lei by Andrea Bocelli From the musical Grease: Sandy; Greased Lightning; We go together
1997–1998	Jive: Stuff like that by Bette Midler (from "For The Boys")	Romeo and Juliet by Sergei Prokofiev	Space by Yello
1996–1997	Tango Argentino: Orgullo Criollo; Canaro en Paris by Sexteto Mayor	Take Five by Paul Desmond; Dave Brubeck Orchestra	Drill Instructor by Captain Jack You must love me by Madonna Fitze, Fitze, Fatze by Helge Schneider
1995–1996	Paso doble: Malaguena	Mambo Number 8; Historia de un Amor; El Mambo	
1994–1995	Quickstep: Ich wollt', ich wär' ein Huhn	Jazz medley from the movie "Casablanca"	Beauty And The Beast
1993–1994	Rhumba: Composition: by Overlight-Studio Berlin, Thomas Kurzhals	Yello, Kenny G. - saxophone, Yello	
1992–1993	Viennese Waltz: Geschichten aus dem Wienerwald by Strauß	Barcelona Nights	
1991–1992	Polka: Kutschke-Polka (old Berlin song)	Starlight Express	
1990–1991	Blues by John Lee Hooker	Starlight Express	
1989–1990	Samba: Tropic Trumpets	Rhumba and Jive: Schwarze Augen	

== Results ==
(ice dance with René Lohse)

International
Event	1989–90	1990–91	1991–92	1992–93	1993–94	1994–95	1995–96	1996–97	1997–98	1998–99	1999–00	2000–01	2001–02	2002–03	2003–04
Olympics									10th				8th		
Worlds						19th	13th	12th	9th	7th	6th	7th	7th		3rd
Europeans				16th		15th	9th		9th	6th	5th	6th		5th	
Grand Prix Final												5th			
Cup of Russia														4th	4th
Lalique								5th				3rd			
Nations Cup					9th	6th	6th	7th	5th	3rd	2nd	4th		3rd	2nd
NHK Trophy										4th		3rd		2nd	4th
Skate America						4th	7th	6th			4th				
Skate Canada							9th								
Nebelhorn						4th									
International: Junior
Junior Worlds		15th	8th												
National
German Champ.			2nd	2nd	3rd	2nd	1st		1st	1st	1st			1st	1st
East German	1st														
