= Beate Richter =

German former figure skater

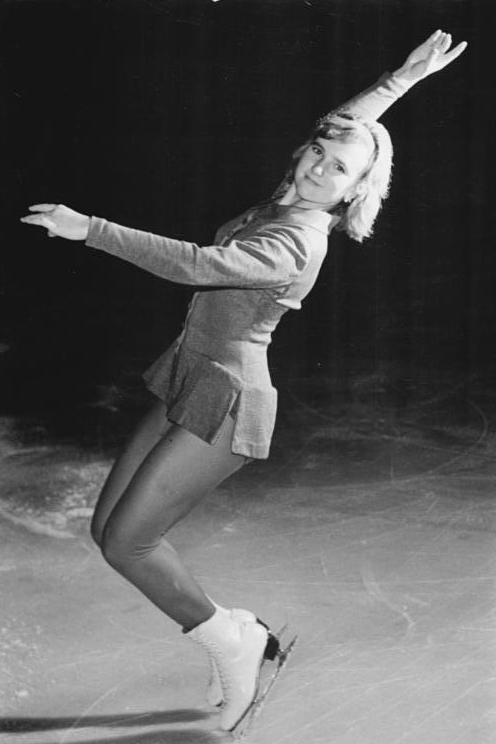
- Richter in 1964

Figure skating career
- Country: East Germany
- Skating club: TSC Berlin
- Retired: c. 1968

Beate Richter is a German former figure skater who represented East Germany. She is the 1967 Blue Swords champion, the 1967 Prague Skate silver medalist, and a four-time East German national medalist. She finished in the top ten at the 1967 European Championships in Ljubljana, Yugoslavia. Her skating club was TSC Berlin.

== Competitive highlights ==
International
| Event | 63–64 | 64–65 | 65–66 | 66–67 | 67–68 |
|---|---|---|---|---|---|
| World Champ. | | | 19th | 19th | |
| European Champ. | | | 11th | 10th | |
| Blue Swords | | 3rd | 2nd | 3rd | 1st |
| Prague Skate | | | | | 2nd |
| Richmond Trophy | | | 3rd | | 5th |
National
| East German Champ. | 3rd | 2nd | 2nd | 2nd | |
