= Knut Schubert =

East German pair skater (born 1958)

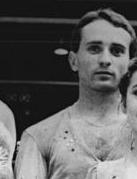
- Knut Schubert, 1981

Personal information
- Born: 9 September 1958 (age 68) Bautzen, East Germany
- Height: 5 ft 5.5 in (166 cm)

Figure skating career
- Country: East Germany
Medal record
Pairs' figure skating
Representing East Germany
European Championships
Bronze medal – third place	1984 Budapest	Pairs
Bronze medal – third place	1983 Dortmund	Pairs

Knut Schubert (born 9 September 1958 in Bautzen, East Germany) is a former East German pair skater. With his sister, Katja Schubert, he won the bronze medal at the 1974 East German Figure Skating Championships. They finished ninth at that year's European Figure Skating Championships and eleventh at the World Figure Skating Championships.

Schubert later teamed up with Birgit Lorenz. They won the gold medal at the East German Championships in 1981 and 1985, and captured the silver medal in four additional years. The couple won the bronze at the European Championships in 1983 and 1984 and finished fifth at the 1984 Winter Olympic Games. They also finished a career-best sixth place at the 1984 World Championships.

After his figure skating career he studied teaching special subject sport. Schubert became a figure skating coach in Berlin. He trained Peggy Schwarz and Alexander König, Peggy Schwarz and Mirko Müller, Mariana Kautz and Norman Jeschke, Mikkeline Kierkgaard and Norman Jeschke and also Sarah Jentgens and Mirko Müller. In the early 1990s he also trained the ice dancers Kati Winkler and René Lohse. After he moved to Dortmund, Schubert trained local pairs of Rebecca Handke and Daniel Wende (until 2007), Ekaterina Vassilieva and Daniel Wende (until 2008) as well as Mari-Doris Vartmann and Florian Just (until 2009).

In 2010 he returned to Berlin and trained Mari-Doris Vartmann and Aaron Van Cleave. He currently coaches Minerva Fabienne Hase and Nikita Volodin.

Schubert is married and has two children. His daughter Pauline Schubert was also a figure skater.

== Results ==
=== With Birgit Lorenz ===
International
Event	78–79	79–80	80–81	81–82	82–83	83–84	84–85	85–86
Olympics						5th		
Worlds			9th	7th	8th	6th		
Europeans			4th	5th	3rd	3rd	4th	
NHK Trophy				2nd			2nd	
Blue Swords	5th	4th	2nd	1st	1st	1st		
Prague Skate	4th	3rd	1st					
Ennia Challenge					2nd	1st		
Moscow News		4th		5th				
National
East Germany	4th	5th	1st	2nd	2nd	2nd	1st	2nd

=== With Katja Schubert ===
International
Event	1973–74	1974–75	1975–76	1976–77
World Championships	11th			
European Champ.	9th			
Blue Swords	5th	3rd		1st
Prize of Moscow News	6th	3rd	6th	
National
East German Champ.	3rd	4th	6th	4th
