= Milada Kubíková =

Czech pair skater

Personal information
- Other names: Milada Kubikova-Stastny
- Born: June 6, 1943 (age 83) Plzeň, Protectorate of Bohemia and Moravia

Figure skating career
- Country: Czechoslovakia
- Began skating: c. 1950
- Retired: 1964

Milada Kubíková, married surname: Stastny, (born June 6, 1943) is a Czech former pair skater who competed for Czechoslovakia. With partner Jaroslav Votruba, she placed 5th at two World Championships and 10th at the 1964 Winter Olympics in Innsbruck, Austria.

== Personal life ==
Milada Kubíková was born on June 6, 1943, in Plzeň, Protectorate of Bohemia and Moravia, the daughter of Milada Kubíková, a lawyer, and Jaroslav Kubík, a doctor. Her brother, also named Jaroslav, is older by four years.

Kubíková studied physical education and Russian at Charles University in Prague. She defected from Czechoslovakia to the United States in 1969. She had two children with her first husband, and a son, born in 1976, with her second husband, a jeweler named Bretislav Stastny.

== Career ==
Kubíková began skating at age seven. Her first pair skating partner was her brother, Jaroslav Kubík.

By the 1958–59 season, she had teamed up with Jaroslav Votruba. They placed seventh at their first major event, the 1962 European Championships in Geneva, Switzerland, and then fifth at the 1962 World Championships in Prague, Czechoslovakia.

Kubíková/Votruba had their best season in 1962–63. The pair placed 5th at the 1963 European Championships in Budapest, Hungary, and achieved the same result at the 1963 World Championships in Cortina d'Ampezzo, Italy.

Kubíková/Votruba finished 12th at the 1964 European Championships in Grenoble, France, and 10th at the 1964 Winter Olympics in Innsbruck, Austria.

Joining the Vienna Ice Revue, Kubíková toured western Europe in 1966–68 and North America in 1969. Czechoslovak authorities destroyed footage of Kubíková/Votruba's performances following her defection, despite her partner staying.

Kubíková became the director of Parkwood Skate School in Great Neck, New York. She was the first coach of Nicole Rajičová.

Kubíková/Votruba were named one of Plzeň's ten "Sport Stars of the 20th Century" at a gala on February 17, 2001.

== Competitive highlights ==
With Votruba

International
Event	58–59	59–60	60–61	61–62	62–63	63–64
Winter Olympics						10th
World Championships				5th	5th	
European Champ.				7th	5th	12th
National
Czechoslovak Champ.	3rd	3rd	2nd	1st	1st	
