= Franz Ningel =

German pair skater

Personal information
- Born: 18 October 1936 (age 89) Frankfurt am Main, Germany

Figure skating career
- Country: West Germany
Medal record
Representing West Germany
Pairs' Figure skating
World Championships
Bronze medal – third place	1962 Prague	Pairs
Silver medal – second place	1957 Colorado Springs	Pairs
Bronze medal – third place	1956 Garmisch-Partenkirchen	Pairs
European Championships
Bronze medal – third place	1962 Geneva	Pairs
Silver medal – second place	1961 West Berlin	Pairs
Bronze medal – third place	1960 Garmisch-Partenkirchen	Pairs
Bronze medal – third place	1957 Vienna	Pairs
Bronze medal – third place	1956 Paris	Pairs
Bronze medal – third place	1955 Budapest	Pairs

Franz Ningel (born 18 October 1936 in Frankfurt) is a former German pair skater and roller skater.

Ningel became World and European champion as a single roller figure skater in 1956 and 1957. He also won the German roller figure skating pair championships with Marika Kilius from 1955 to 1957.

In pairs figure skating, Kilius / Ningel became the 1957 World silver and 1956 World bronze medalists, three-time (1955–195) European bronze medalists, and three-time German national champions.

With his wife Margret Göbl, Ningel is the 1962 World bronze medalist, a three-time (1960–1962) European medalist, and a three-time (1960–1962) German national champion. The pair also finished fifth at the 1960 Winter Olympics in Squaw Valley.

== Competitive highlights ==
=== Pairs figure skating with Göbl ===
Event	1959	1960	1961	1962
Olympic Winter Games		5th		
World Championships	5th	4th		3rd
European Championships	4th	3rd	2nd	3rd
German Championships	2nd	1st	1st	1st

=== Pairs figure skating with Kilius ===
Event	1954	1955	1956	1957
Winter Olympic Games			4th	
World Championships		7th	3rd	2nd
European Championships		3rd	3rd	3rd
German Championships	2nd	1st	1st	1st
