= Alexander König =

German figure skater

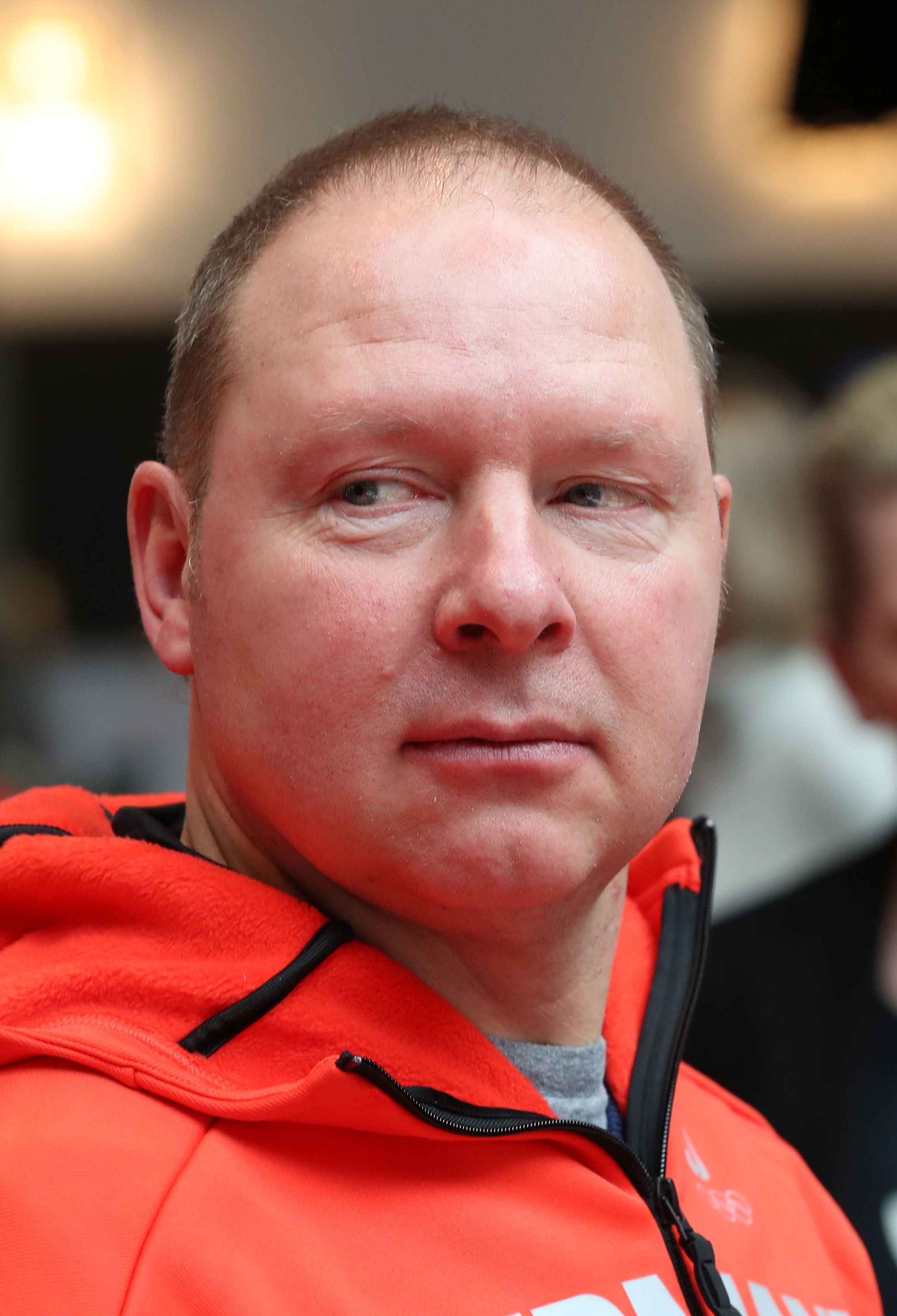
- Alexander König (2018)

Personal information
- Born: 23 August 1966 (age 59) Eilenburg, Bezirk Leipzig, East Germany
- Height: 5 ft 9 in (175 cm)

Figure skating career
- Country: Germany
Medal record
Representing East Germany
Pairs' Figure skating
European Championships
| Bronze medal – third place | 1988 Budapest | Pairs |
Figure skating: Men's singles
World Junior Championships
| Bronze medal – third place | 1982 Oberstdorf | Men's singles |

Alexander König (born 23 August 1966) is a German figure skating coach and former competitor. Competing in pairs with Peggy Schwarz, he became the 1988 European bronze medalist and placed seventh at three Winter Olympics. As a single skater, he is the 1982 World Junior bronze medalist.

== Personal life ==
König was born on 23 August 1966 in Eilenburg, Bezirk Leipzig, East Germany. In 1969, his family moved to Berlin. From 1985 to 1988, he attended school to become a specialist in gastronomy. From 1994 to 1997, he studied sport at the Trainerakademie in Cologne.

== Career ==
=== Competitive career ===
König began learning to skate in Berlin and would become a member of SC Dynamo Berlin. Inge Wischnewski was one of his first coaches at the club.

Competing as a single skater, he won bronze at the 1982 World Junior Championships, which took place in December 1981 in Oberstdorf.

In 1985, König switched to pair skating and teamed up with Peggy Schwarz. Their coach was Hedemarie Steiner-Walther. Schwarz/König won the bronze medal at the 1988 European Championships. They represented East Germany at the 1988 Winter Olympics in Calgary, finishing seventh.

In 1990, Schwarz/König changed coaches, deciding to join Knut Schubert. They placed seventh at the 1992 Winter Olympics in Albertville and had the same result at the 1994 Winter Olympics in Lillehammer.

The pair parted ways in 1994 as Schwarz was pregnant. König decided to retire from competition that year.

=== Coaching career and other work ===
König is an A-licensed coach of the Deutsche Eislauf-Union. While studying, he worked as a coach in Stuttgart. Following his graduation, he took a coaching job in Chemnitz. From 2001 to 2008, König coached in Berlin. He is also a figure skating judge and technical specialist. He coached in Oberstdorf from the summer of 2008 until 2018. In 2018, he returned to coach in Berlin.

In October 2014, König joined the coaching team of Aliona Savchenko and Bruno Massot. The pair would win gold at the 2018 Winter Olympics, 2018 World Championships, and 2017–18 Grand Prix of Figure Skating Final.

In the fall of 2022, he briefly coached Georgian pair teams, Karina Safina / Luka Berulava and Anastasia Metelkina / Daniil Parkman.

Since 1983, König has also had a career as a painter. He has had several exhibitions for his paintings.

== Results ==
=== Men's singles ===
International
| Event | 1980–81 | 1981–82 | 1982–83 | 1983–84 |
|---|---|---|---|---|
| European Champ. | | WD | | |
| Blue Swords | | 1st | | |
International: Junior
| World Junior Champ. | | 3rd | | |
National
| East German Champ. | 3rd | | 3rd | 2nd |
WD = Withdrew

=== Pairs career with Schwarz ===
International
| Event | 86–87 | 87–88 | 88–89 | 89–90 | 90–91 | 91–92 | 92–93 | 93–94 |
|---|---|---|---|---|---|---|---|---|
| Olympics | | 7th | | | | 7th | | 7th |
| Worlds | | | 4th | 10th | 7th | 6th | 12th | 9th |
| Europeans | | 3rd | | 4th | | 5th | 5th | 7th |
| Nations Cup | | | | 2nd | | | | |
| NHK Trophy | | | | | 7th | | | |
| Skate America | | | | 3rd | | 3rd | | |
| Skate Canada | | | 2nd | 4th | | | | |
National
| Germany | | | | | 2nd | 1st | WD | 2nd |
| East Germany | 3rd | 1st | | | | | | |
WD = Withdrew
