= Falko Kirsten =

German figure skater

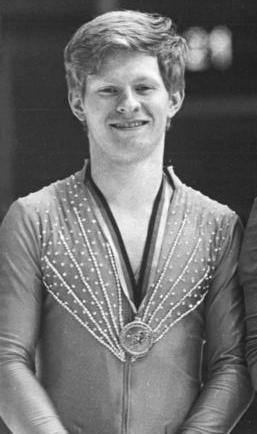
- Kirsten in 1985

Personal information
- Born: 3 January 1964 (age 62) Dresden, East Germany
- Height: 1.68 m (5 ft 6 in)

Figure skating career
- Country: East Germany
- Skating club: SC Einheit Dresden
- Retired: 1987

Falko Kirsten (born 3 January 1964) is a German former figure skater. He is the 1980 World Junior bronze medalist, the 1983 St. Ivel International bronze medalist, and a five-time East German national champion. He competed at six European Championships, finishing twice in the top five; five World Championships; and the 1984 Winter Olympics in Sarajevo, finishing 16th. He represented the club SC Einheit Dresden.

Kirsten is the chairman of the Saxony Ice Sport Association (Sächsischen Eissport-Verband) and also works as a technical specialist.

== Results ==
International
Event	75–76	76–77	77–78	78–79	79–80	80–81	81–82	82–83	83–84	84–85	85–86	86–87
Olympics									16th			
Worlds						13th		12th		12th	12th	13th
Europeans						8th		12th	9th	5th	6th	5th
Moscow News					4th					6th	7th	
St. Ivel									3rd			
International: Junior
Junior Worlds				4th	3rd							
National
East German	3rd	3rd	4th	4th				1st	1st	1st	1st	1st
