= Kerstin Stolfig =

German former pair skater (born 1960)

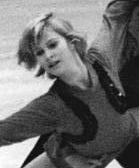
- Kerstin Stolfig, 1974

Personal information
- Born: 5 December 1960 (age 65) East Berlin, East Germany
- Height: 5 ft 5 in (165 cm)

Figure skating career
- Country: East Germany
- Partner: Veit Kempe
- Skating club: SC Dynamo Berlin

Kerstin Stolfig (born 5 December 1960 in East Berlin) is a German former pair skater who represented East Germany. She and her skating partner, Veit Kempe, placed sixth at the 1976 Winter Olympics; the pair became two-time East German national silver medalists.

After retiring from competition, Stolfig married bobsledder and fellow Olympian Hans-Jürgen Gerhardt.

== Results ==
=== Pairs with Kempe ===
International
Event	74–75	75–76	76–77	77–78	78–79	79–80
Winter Olympics		6th				
World Championships	7th	7th			10th	
European Champ.	7th	6th		6th	5th	7th
Prize of Moscow News	2nd					
National
East German Champ.	3rd		2nd	3rd	2nd	3rd

=== Ladies' singles ===
International
Event	1972–73
Blue Swords	6th
