= Michael Phillips (figure skater) =

British figure skater

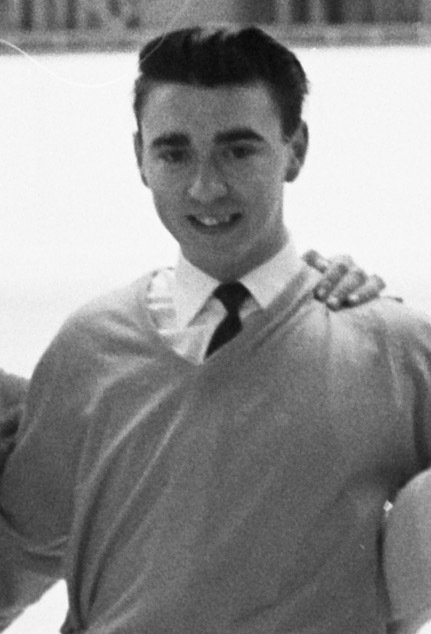
- Phillips in 1962

Personal information
- Died: August 2016

Figure skating career
- Country: United Kingdom
- Retired: 1963
Medal record
Figure skating: Ice dancing
Representing United Kingdom
World Championships
Silver medal – second place	1963 Cortina d'Ampezzo	Ice dancing
European Championships
Gold medal – first place	1963 Budapest	Ice dancing
Silver medal – second place	1962 Geneva	Ice dancing
Bronze medal – third place	1961 West Berlin	Ice dancing

Michael Phillips was a British competitive ice dancer. With partner Linda Shearman, he became the 1963 European champion and 1963 World silver medalist. He died in August 2016.

== Results ==
(with Linda Shearman)

International
Event	1961	1962	1963
World Championships		4th	2nd
European Championships	3rd	2nd	1st
National
British Championships		1st	1st
