= Ralf Richter (figure skater) =

East German figure skater

Ralf Richter is a former East German figure skater.

== Results ==
Event	1967-68	1968-69	1969-70	1970-71
European Championships			13th	
East German Championships	3rd	3rd	3rd	2nd
Prize of Moscow News			6th	
