= East German Figure Skating Championships =

Defunct figure skating competition

- Status: Defunct
- Genre: National championships
- Frequency: Annual
- Country: East Germany
- Years active: 1949–90
- Organizer: Ice Skating Association of East Germany

The East German Figure Skating Championships (German: DDR Eiskunstlauf Meisterschaften) were an annual figure skating competition organized by the Ice Skating Association of East Germany (German: Deutscher Eislauf Verband der DDR) to crown the national champions of East Germany. The first championships held after the partition of Germany took place in 1949 in Oberhof. They were held regularly between 1949 and 1990, at which point East Germany was reunited with West Germany.

Medals were awarded in men's singles, women's singles, pair skating, and ice dance at the senior and junior levels, although not every discipline was necessarily held every year due to a lack of participants. Jan Hoffmann holds the record for winning the most East German Championship titles in men's singles (with eight), while Gabriele Seyfert holds the record in women's singles (with ten). The record in pair skating is held by Heinz-Ulrich Walther (with six), although those were not all won with the same partner. Annerose Baier and Eberhard Rüger hold the record in ice dance (with seven).

== History ==
Following the collapse of the Third Reich in 1945 and its defeat in World War II, Germany was divided between the Western Bloc led by the United States and the Eastern Bloc led by the Soviet Union. Two separate German countries emerged: the Federal Republic of Germany (German: Bundesrepublik Deutschland), also known as West Germany; and the German Democratic Republic (German: Deutsche Demokratische Republik), also known as East Germany.

The first figure skating championships held in the east after the division of Germany took place in 1949 as part of a larger competition featuring several winter sports (German: Wintersportmeisterschaften) in Oberhof. The East German Figure Skating Championships (German: DDR Eiskunstlauf Meisterschaften) were held annually from 1949 to 1990, except for 1957 and 1958. Ice dance was added as an event in 1954, but held sporadically through the history of East Germany. During this same time period, separate figure skating championships were held in West Germany; those results are considered the historic results of the German Figure Skating Championships.

The dissolution of East Germany occurred on 3 October 1990, leading to its reintegration into the Federal Republic of Germany to form present-day Germany. Following the reunification of Germany, East German skaters began competing at the German Championships, and many former East German skaters became champions of the newly reunified Germany, including Mirko Eichhorn, Alexander König, René Lohse, Axel Rauschenbach, Peggy Schwarz, Ingo Steuer, Kati Winkler, and Ronny Winkler.

== Senior medalists ==
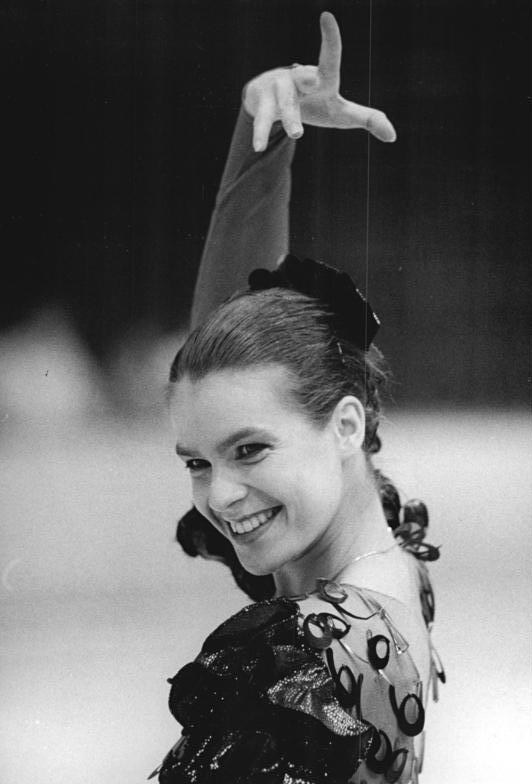
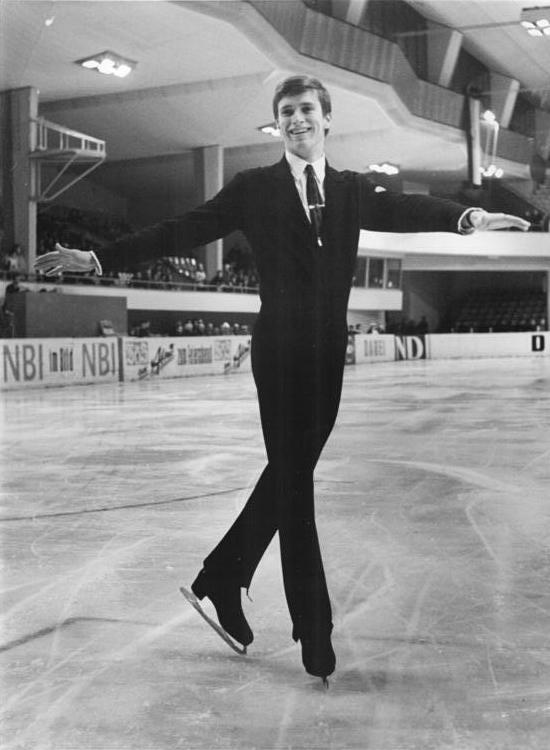
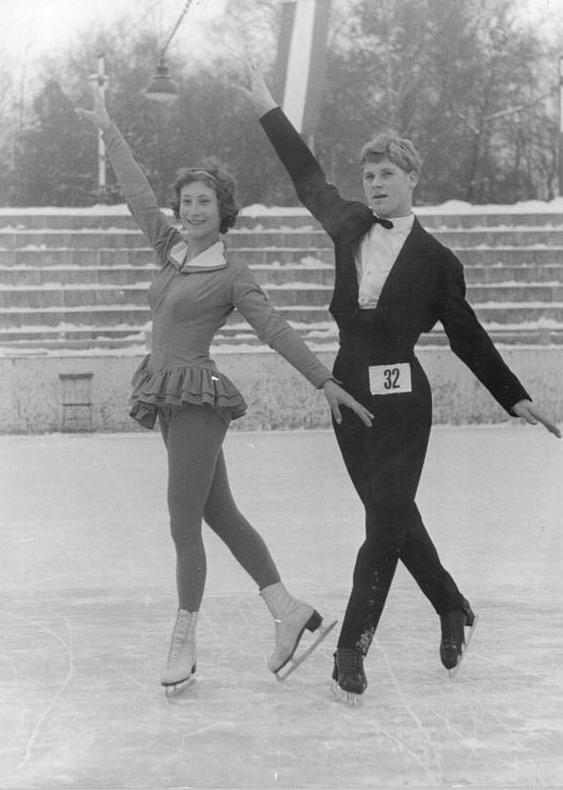
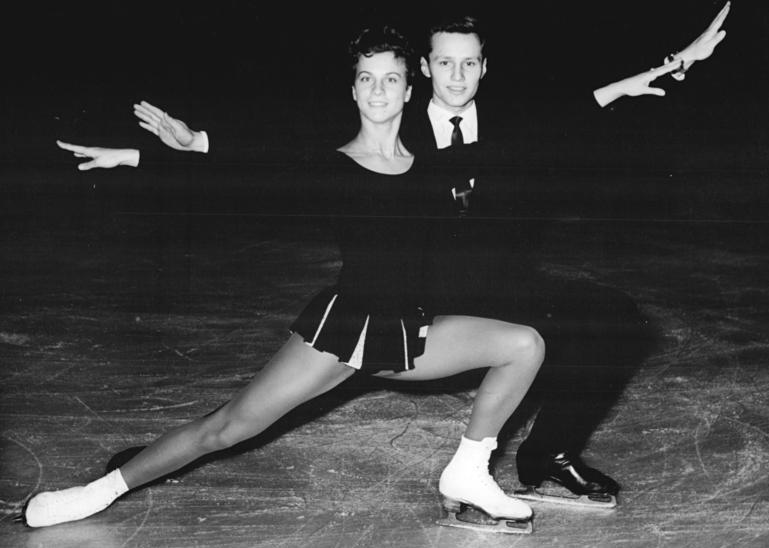
From left to right: Katarina Witt, eight-time East German champion in women's singles; Günter Zöller, five-time East German champion in men's singles; Margit Senf and Peter Göbel, four-time East German champions in pair skating; and Annerose Baier and Eberhard Rüger, seven-time East German champions in ice dance

=== Men's singles ===
Senior men's event medalists
Year	Location	Gold	Silver	Bronze	Ref.
1949	Oberhof	No men's competitors			
1950	Schierke	Helmut Lisinek (Note: Helmut Lisinek did not achieve the minimum required score to named the East German champion.)	No other competitors		
1951	East Berlin	Horst Kuhrüber	Heinz Kuhrüber	No other competitors	
1952	East Berlin	Kurt Weilert	Horst Kuhrüber	Heinz Kuhrüber	
1953	Oberhof	Horst Kuhrüber	Heinz Kuhrüber	Wolfgang Hartung	
1954	East Berlin	Heinz Kuhrüber	Horst Kuhrüber	No other competitors	
1955	Geising	Heinz Kuhrüber	Wolfgang Hartung	No other competitors	
1956	Rostock	No men's competitors			
1957–58	No national championships held				
1959	Karl-Marx-Stadt	Bodo Bockenauer	Michael Flebbe	No other competitors	
1960	Karl-Marx-Stadt	Bodo Bockenauer	Michael Flebbe	No other competitors	
1961	Dresden	Bodo Bockenauer	Michael Flebbe	No other competitors	
1962	East Berlin	Bodo Bockenauer	Ralph Borghard	No other competitors	
1963	Karl-Marx-Stadt	Ralph Borghard	Günter Zöller	No other competitors	
1964	East Berlin	Ralph Borghard	Günter Zöller	No other competitors	
1965	East Berlin	Günter Zöller	No other competitors		
1966	Karl-Marx-Stadt	Ralph Borghard	Günter Zöller	Rolf Österreich	
1967	Karl-Marx-Stadt	Günter Zöller	Reinhard Mirmseker	Klaus Purrücker	
1968	East Berlin	Günter Zöller	Rolf Österreich	Ralf Richter	
1969	Karl-Marx-Stadt	Günter Zöller	Jan Hoffmann	Ralf Richter	
1970	East Berlin	Günter Zöller	Jan Hoffmann	Ralf Richter	
1971	Karl-Marx-Stadt	Jan Hoffmann	Ralf Richter	Bernd Wunderlich	
1972	East Berlin	Günter Zöller	Jan Hoffmann	Bernd Wunderlich	
1973	Dresden	Jan Hoffmann	Bernd Wunderlich	Michael Glaubitz	
1974	East Berlin	Jan Hoffmann	Michael Glaubitz	Bernd Wunderlich	
1975	Dresden	Bernd Wunderlich	Hermann Schulz	No other competitors	
1976	East Berlin	Jan Hoffmann	Mario Liebers	Falko Kirsten	
1977	Karl-Marx-Stadt	Jan Hoffmann	Mario Liebers	Falko Kirsten	
1978	Karl-Marx-Stadt	Jan Hoffmann	Mario Liebers	Torsten Ohlow	
1979	East Berlin	Jan Hoffmann	Mario Liebers	Hermann Schulz	
1980	Karl-Marx-Stadt	Jan Hoffmann	Mario Liebers	Hermann Schulz	
1981	Karl-Marx-Stadt	Hermann Schulz	Ralf Lewandowski	Alexander König	
1982	Karl-Marx-Stadt	No men's competitors			
1983	East Berlin	Falko Kirsten	Nils Köpp	Alexander König	
1984	Karl-Marx-Stadt	Falko Kirsten	Alexander König	Nils Köpp	
1985	East Berlin	Falko Kirsten	Nils Köpp	Ralf Lewandowski	
1986	Karl-Marx-Stadt	Falko Kirsten	Nils Köpp	Ralf Lewandowski	
1987	East Berlin	Falko Kirsten	Nils Köpp	No other competitors	
1988	Karl-Marx-Stadt	Michael Huth	Rico Krahnert	Mirko Eichhorn	
1989	East Berlin	Mirko Eichhorn	Ronny Winkler	Rico Krahnert	
1990	Karl-Marx-Stadt	Ronny Winkler	Mirko Eichhorn	Thomas Dörmer	

=== Women's singles ===
Senior women's event medalists
Year	Location	Gold	Silver	Bronze	Ref.
1949	Oberhof	Gudrun Olbricht	Brigitte Schellhorn	Gerda Siepert	
1950	Schierke	Brigitte Schellhorn	Grunhild Poltin	No other competitors	
1951	East Berlin	Gunhild Poltin	Brigitte Schellhorn	Inge Kabisch	
1952	East Berlin	Inge Kabisch	Renate Brettschneider	Jutta Seyfert	
1953	Oberhof	Inge Kabisch	Annemarie Klöpsch	Jutta Seyfert	
1954	East Berlin	Inge Kabisch	Jutta Seyfert	Brigitte Schellhorn	
1955	Geising	Inge Kabisch	Jutta Seyfert	Christa Schulze	
1956	Rostock	Marie-Luise Dostmann	Helga Böttger	No other competitors	
1957–58	No national championships held				
1959	Karl-Marx-Stadt	Monika Ziemke	Hella Rathje	Irene Müller	
1960	Karl-Marx-Stadt	Heidemarie Steiner	Hella Rathje	Monika Ziemke	
1961	Dresden	Gabriele Seyfert	Monika Ziemke	Heidemarie Steiner	
1962	East Berlin	Gabriele Seyfert	Heidemarie Steiner	Brigitte Klewer	
1963	Karl-Marx-Stadt	Gabriele Seyfert	Heidemarie Steiner	Marianne Mirmseker	
1964	East Berlin	Gabriele Seyfert	Marianne Mirmseker	Beate Richter	
1965	East Berlin	Gabriele Seyfert	Beate Richter	Jutta Will	
1966	Karl-Marx-Stadt	Gabriele Seyfert	Beate Richter	Martina Clausner	
1967	Karl-Marx-Stadt	Gabriele Seyfert	Beate Richter	Martina Clausner	
1968	East Berlin	Gabriele Seyfert	Martina Clausner	Kerstin Stolfig	
1969	Karl-Marx-Stadt	Gabriele Seyfert	Sonja Morgenstern	Christine Errath	
1970	East Berlin	Gabriele Seyfert	Sonja Morgenstern	Christine Errath	
1971	Karl-Marx-Stadt	Sonja Morgenstern	Christine Errath	Simone Gräfe	
1972	East Berlin	Sonja Morgenstern	Christine Errath	Steffi Knoll	
1973	Dresden	Sonja Morgenstern	Christine Errath	Anett Pötzsch	
1974	East Berlin	Christine Errath	Anett Pötzsch	Marion Weber	
1975	Dresden	Christine Errath	Anett Pötzsch	Steffi Knoll	
1976	East Berlin	Anett Pötzsch	Marion Weber	Karin Enke	
1977	Karl-Marx-Stadt	Anett Pötzsch	Marion Weber	Karin Enke	
1978	Karl-Marx-Stadt	Anett Pötzsch	Carola Weißenberg	Marion Weber	
1979	East Berlin	Anett Pötzsch	Carola Weißenberg	Katarina Witt	
1980	Karl-Marx-Stadt	Anett Pötzsch	Katarina Witt	Carola Weißenberg	
1981	Karl-Marx-Stadt	Katarina Witt	Carola Paul	Karin Hendschke	
1982	Karl-Marx-Stadt	Katarina Witt	Janina Wirth	Carola Paul	
1983	East Berlin	Katarina Witt	Janina Wirth	Karin Hendschke	
1984	Karl-Marx-Stadt	Katarina Witt	Simone Koch	Constanze Gensel	
1985	East Berlin	Katarina Witt	Constanze Gensel	Simone Koch	
1986	Karl-Marx-Stadt	Katarina Witt	Constanze Gensel	Simone Koch	
1987	East Berlin	Katarina Witt	Inga Gauter	Simone Koch	
1988	Karl-Marx-Stadt	Katarina Witt	Simone Koch	Evelyn Großmann	
1989	East Berlin	Evelyn Großmann	Simone Lang	Simone Koch	
1990	Karl-Marx-Stadt	Tanja Krienke	Cathrin Degler	Claudia Wagler	

=== Pairs ===
Senior pairs' event medalists
Year	Location	Gold	Silver	Bronze	Ref.
1949	Oberhof	Jutta Seyfert; Irene Salzmann	No other competitors		
1950	Schierke	Carla Listing; Walter Bärtling	Vera Lampe; Horst Kuhrüber	No other competitors	
1951	East Berlin	Vera Lampe; Horst Kuhrüber	Carla Listing; Walter Bärtling	No other competitors	
1952	East Berlin	Vera Lampe; Horst Kuhrüber	No other competitors		
1953	Oberhof	No pairs competitors			
1954	East Berlin	Vera Kuhrüber (née Lampe); Horst Kuhrüber	Ingelore Gotsch; Heinz Kuhrüber	No other competitors	
1955	Geising	Vera Kuhrüber (née Lampe); Horst Kuhrüber	Marie-Luise Dostmann; Hans-Jürgen Kutschebauch	No other competitors	
1956	Rostock	No pairs competitors			
1957–58	No national championships held				
1959	Karl-Marx-Stadt	Irene Müller; Bodo Bockenauer	No other competitors		
1960	Karl-Marx-Stadt	Margit Senf; Peter Göbel	Irene Müller; Hans-Georg Dallmer	Brigitte Wokoeck; Heinz-Ulrich Walther	
1961	Dresden	Margit Senf; Peter Göbel	Irene Müller; Hans-Georg Dallmer	Renate Rößler; Klaus Wasserfuhr	
1962	East Berlin	Brigitte Wokoeck; Heinz-Ulrich Walther	Irene Müller; Hans-Georg Dallmer	Renate Rößler; Klaus Wasserfuhr	
1963	Karl-Marx-Stadt	Margit Senf; Peter Göbel	Irene Müller; Hans-Georg Dallmer	Brigitte Wokoeck; Heinz-Ulrich Walther	
1964	East Berlin	Brigitte Wokoeck; Heinz-Ulrich Walther	Irene Müller; Hans-Georg Dallmer	Margit Senf; Peter Göbel	
1965	East Berlin	Irene Müller; Hans-Georg Dallmer	Renate Rößler; Klaus Wasserfuhr	Brigitte Weise; Michael Brychczy	
1966	Karl-Marx-Stadt	Heidemarie Steiner; Heinz-Ulrich Walther	Brigitte Weise; Michael Brychczy	Renate Rößler; Klaus Wasserfuhr	
1967	Karl-Marx-Stadt	Heidemarie Steiner; Heinz-Ulrich Walther	Brigitte Weise; Michael Brychczy	Renate Rößler; Klaus Wasserfuhr	
1968	East Berlin	Irene Müller; Hans-Georg Dallmer	Heidemarie Steiner; Heinz-Ulrich Walther	Brigitte Weise; Michael Brychczy	
1969	Karl-Marx-Stadt	Heidemarie Steiner; Heinz-Ulrich Walther	Manuela Groß; Uwe Kagelmann	Beatrice von Brück; Reinhard Mirmseker	
1970	East Berlin	Heidemarie Steiner; Heinz-Ulrich Walther	Manuela Groß; Uwe Kagelmann	Annette Kansy; Axel Salzmann	
1971	Karl-Marx-Stadt	Manuela Groß; Uwe Kagelmann	Annette Kansy; Axel Salzmann	Marlies Radunsky; Rolf Österreich	
1972	East Berlin	Manuela Groß; Uwe Kagelmann	Annette Kansy; Axel Salzmann	Marlies Radunsky; Rolf Österreich	
1973	Dresden	Romy Kermer; Rolf Österreich	Sylvia Konzack; Veit Kempe	Antje Heck; Tassilo Thierbach	
1974	East Berlin	Manuela Groß; Uwe Kagelmann	Romy Kermer; Rolf Österreich	Katja Schubert; Knut Schubert	
1975	Dresden	Romy Kermer; Rolf Österreich	Manuela Groß; Uwe Kagelmann	Kerstin Stolfig; Veit Kempe	
1976	East Berlin	Romy Kermer; Rolf Österreich	Manuela Groß; Uwe Kagelmann	Sabine Baeß; Tassilo Thierbach	
1977	Karl-Marx-Stadt	Manuela Mager; Uwe Bewersdorf	Kerstin Stolfig; Veit Kempe	Sabine Baeß; Tassilo Thierbach	
1978	Karl-Marx-Stadt	Manuela Mager; Uwe Bewersdorf	Sabine Baeß; Tassilo Thierbach	Kerstin Stolfig; Veit Kempe	
1979	East Berlin	Sabine Baeß; Tassilo Thierbach	Kerstin Stolfig; Veit Kempe	Cornelia Haufe; Kersten Bellmann	
1980	Karl-Marx-Stadt	Sabine Baeß; Tassilo Thierbach	Manuela Mager; Uwe Bewersdorf	Kerstin Stolfig; Veit Kempe	
1981	Karl-Marx-Stadt	Birgit Lorenz; Knut Schubert	Katharina Barta; Tobias Schröter	Gesine Bosdorf; Jens Preußner	
1982	Karl-Marx-Stadt	Sabine Baeß; Tassilo Thierbach	Birgit Lorenz; Knut Schubert	Gesine Bosdorf; Jens Preußner	
1983	East Berlin	Sabine Baeß; Tassilo Thierbach	Birgit Lorenz; Knut Schubert	Babette Preußler; Torsten Ohlow	
1984	Karl-Marx-Stadt	Sabine Baeß; Tassilo Thierbach	Birgit Lorenz; Knut Schubert	Babette Preußler; Tobias Schröter	
1985	East Berlin	Birgit Lorenz; Knut Schubert	Manuela Landgraf; Ingo Steuer	Peggy Seidel; Ralf Seifert	
1986	Karl-Marx-Stadt	Katrin Kanitz; Tobias Schröter	Birgit Lorenz; Knut Schubert	Peggy Seidel; Ralf Seifert	
1987	East Berlin	Katrin Kanitz; Tobias Schröter	Antje Schramm; Jens Müller	Peggy Schwarz; Alexander König	
1988	Karl-Marx-Stadt	Peggy Schwarz; Alexander König	Mandy Wötzel; Axel Rauschenbach	No other competitors	
1989	East Berlin	Mandy Wötzel; Axel Rauschenbach	Angela Caspary; Marno Kreft	Ines Müller; Ingo Steuer	
1990	Karl-Marx-Stadt	Mandy Wötzel; Axel Rauschenbach	Angela Caspary; Marno Kreft	Ines Müller; Ingo Steuer	

=== Ice dance ===
Kati Winkler and René Lohse originally trained in single skating, but switched to ice dance after an injury prevented Winkler from executing the necessary jumps. In an interview, Lohse stated: "It was a hard time, because for eighteen years, there was no ice dancing in East Germany and we were the first who started it again."

Senior ice dance event medalists
Year	Location	Gold	Silver	Bronze	Ref.
No ice dance competitions prior to 1954
1954	East Berlin	Ingelore Gotsch; Heinz Kuhrüber	Therese Geidel; Heinz Lindner	Vera Lampe-Kuhrüber; Horst Kuhrüber	
1955	Geising	Therese Geidel; Heinz Lindner	Ingelore Gotsch; Heinz Kuhrüber	No other competitors	
1956	Rostock	Therese Geidel; Heinz Lindner	No other competitors		
1957–58	No national championships held				
1959–62	No ice dance competitors				
1963	Karl-Marx-Stadt	Eva Marie Reuter; Bernd Egert	Annerose Baier; Eberhard Rüger	Monika Ziemke; Jochen Bode	
1964	East Berlin	Annerose Baier; Eberhard Rüger	Monika Ziemke; Jochen Bode	Eva Marie Reuter; Bernd Egert	
1965	East Berlin	Annerose Baier; Eberhard Rüger	Monika Ziemke; Jochen Bode	Eva Marie Reuter; Bernd Egert	
1966	Karl-Marx-Stadt	Annerose Baier; Eberhard Rüger	Norma Allwelt; Michael Schmidt	Steffi Böhme; Bernd Egert	
1967	Karl-Marx-Stadt	Annerose Baier; Eberhard Rüger	Norma Allwelt; Michael Schmidt	Steffi Böhme; Bernd Egert	
1968	East Berlin	Annerose Baier; Eberhard Rüger	Steffi Böhme; Bernd Egert	Norma Allwelt; Michael Schmidt	
1969	Karl-Marx-Stadt	Annerose Baier; Eberhard Rüger	Norma Allwelt; Michael Schmidt	Sylke Müller; Peter Müller	
1970	East Berlin	Annerose Baier; Eberhard Rüger	Sylke Müller; Peter Müller	No other competitors	
1971–88	No ice dance competitors				
1989	East Berlin	Antje Schramm; Daniel Hofbauer	Kati Winkler; René Lohse	Tarja Kühlfluck; Ralf Seidel	
1990	Karl-Marx-Stadt	Kati Winkler; René Lohse	No other competitors		

== Records ==
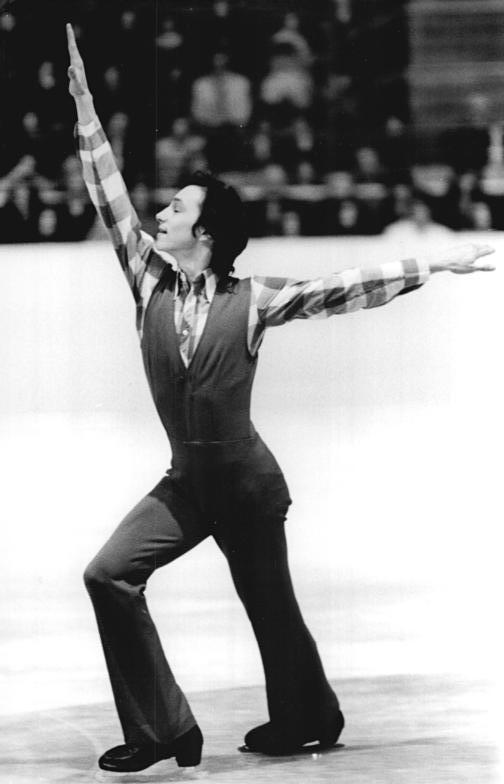
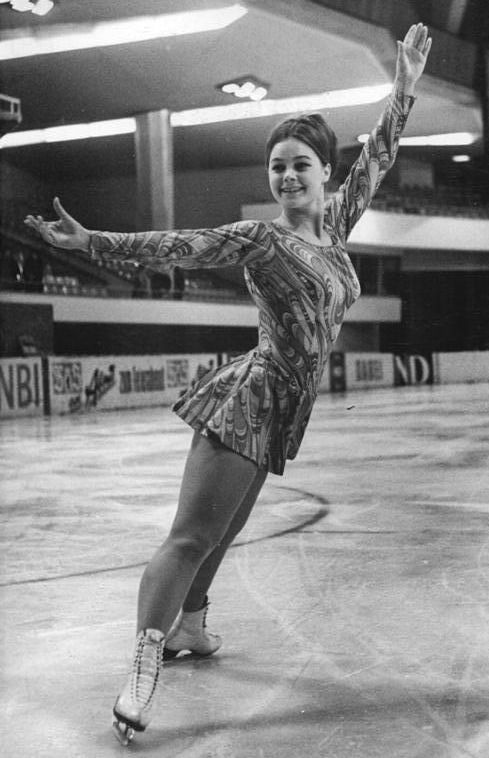
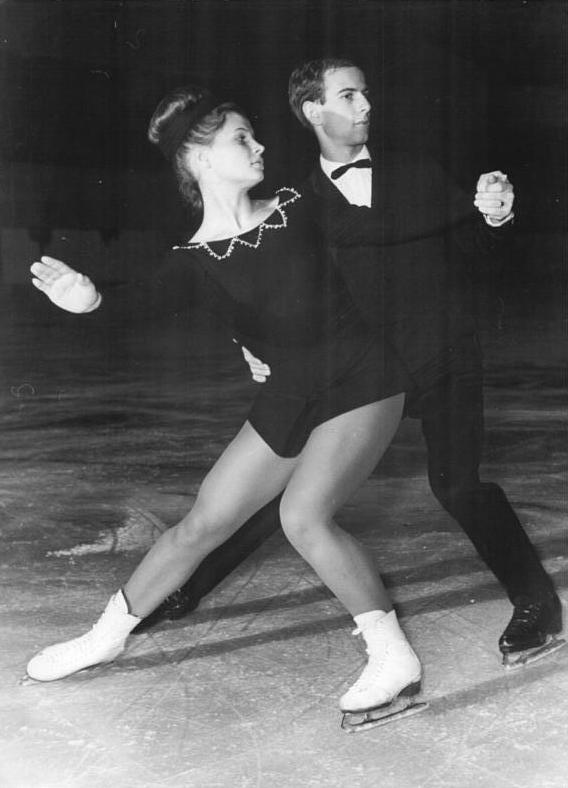
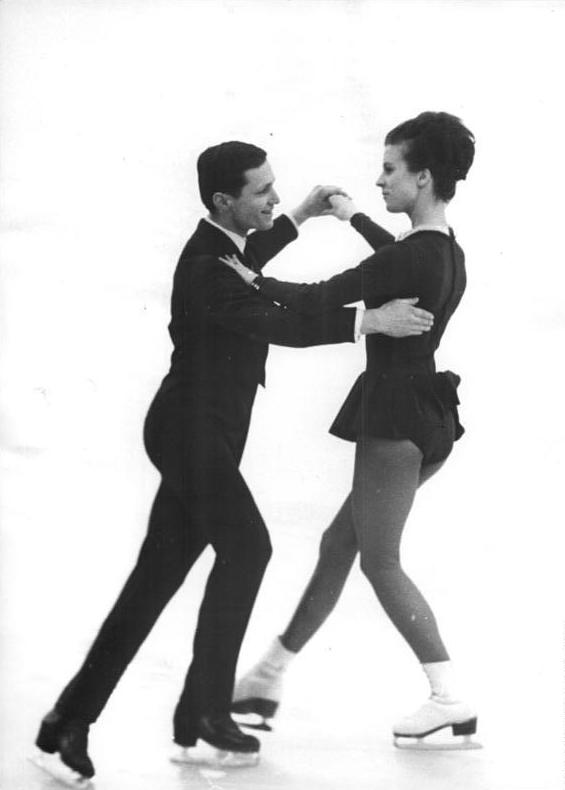
From left to right: Jan Hoffmann won eight East German Championship titles in men's singles; Gabriele Seyfert won ten East German Championship titles in women's singles; Heinz-Ulrich Walther won six East German Championship titles in pair skating, two of which were with Brigitte Wockoeck; and Annerose Baier and Eberhard Rüger won seven East German Championship titles in ice dance.

Records
Discipline	Most championship titles			
Discipline	Skater(s)	No.	Years	Ref.
Men's singles	Jan Hoffmann	8	1971; 1973–74; 1976–80	
Women's singles	Gabriele Seyfert	10	1961–70	
Pairs	Heinz-Ulrich Walther; (Note: Heinz-Ulrich Walther won two championship titles while partnered with Brigitte Wokoeck (1962, 1964) and four with Heidemarie Steiner (1966–67, 1969–70).)	6	1962; 1964; 1966–67; 1969–70	
Ice dance	Annerose Baier; Eberhard Rüger	7	1964–70	
