= Carola Paul =

German figure skater

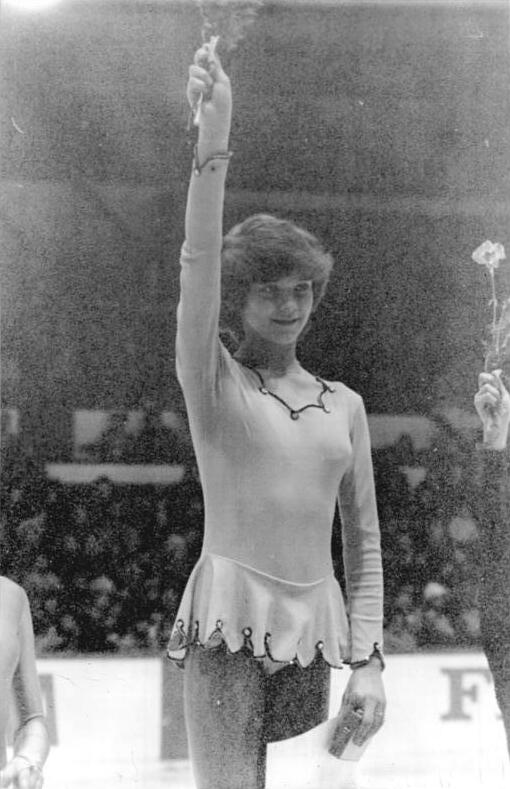
- Carola Paul at the Prague Skate in November 1980

Personal information
- Born: 1960s East Germany

Figure skating career
- Country: East Germany
- Retired: 1982

Carola Paul (born in the 1960s) is a former competitive figure skater who represented East Germany. She won bronze at the 1980 World Junior Championships, bronze at the 1980 Richmond Trophy, and gold at the 1980 Prague Skate, ahead of Anna Kondrashova. Paul competed at four senior ISU Championships — her best results were eighth at the 1981 World Championships in Hartford, Connecticut and seventh at the 1982 European Championships in Lyon. She represented SC Einheit Dresden.

== Competitive highlights ==
International
Event	1979–80	1980–81	1981–82
World Champ.		8th	11th
European Champ.		9th	7th
Prague Skate		1st	
Richmond Trophy		3rd	
International: Junior
World Junior Champ.	3rd		
National
East German Champ.		2nd	3rd
