= Karin Hendschke =

German figure skater

Karin Hendschke (married surname Raddatz) is a former East-German figure skater. She is the 1984 World Junior Champion. During her competitive career, she represented the club TSC Berlin.

Hendschke studied sport at the DHfK Leipzig. She works now as a coach at her home club TSC Berlin and is also an ISU technical specialist.

== Results ==
International
Event	1980–81	1981–82	1982–83	1983–84
European Champ.			14th	12th
NHK Trophy				1st
Prague Skate			3rd	
International: Junior
World Junior Champ.			2nd	1st
National
East German Champ.	3rd		3rd	
