= Margret Göbl =

German pair skater

Personal information
- Born: 26 June 1938 Nürnberg
- Died: 21 June 2013 (aged 74) Essen

Figure skating career
- Country: West Germany
- Retired: 1962
Medal record
Representing West Germany
Pairs' Figure skating
World Championships
Bronze medal – third place	1962 Prague	Pairs
European Championships
Bronze medal – third place	1962 Geneva	Pairs
Silver medal – second place	1961 West Berlin	Pairs
Bronze medal – third place	1960 Garmisch-Partenkirchen	Pairs

Margret Göbl (26 June 1938 – 21 June 2013) was a German pair skater. With her husband Franz Ningel, she was the 1962 World bronze medalist, a three-time (1960–1962) European medalist, and a three-time (1960–1962) German national champion. The pair also finished fifth at the 1960 Winter Olympics in Squaw Valley. They were coached by Rosemarie Brüning.

Margret Göbl was born in Nürnberg, but grew up in Oberammergau. She lived in Frankfurt/Main and Duisburg with her husband Franz Ningel. She died in Essen, aged 74.

== Competitive highlights ==
=== Pairs figure skating career ===
(with Franz Ningel)

Event	1959	1960	1961	1962
Olympic Winter Games		5th		
World Championships	5th	4th		3rd
European Championships	4th	3rd	2nd	3rd
German Championships	2nd	1st	1st	1st
