= Romy Kermer =

East German pair skater

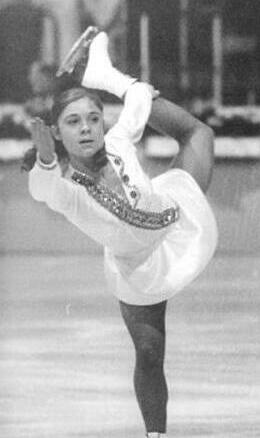
- Romy Kermer in 1975

Personal information
- Born: 28 July 1956 (age 69) Karl-Marx-Stadt, Bezirk Karl-Marx-Stadt, East Germany
- Height: 164 cm (5 ft 4.6 in)

Figure skating career
- Country: East Germany
- Retired: 1976
Medal record
Representing East Germany
Figure skating: Pairs
Olympic Games
| Silver medal – second place | 1976 Innsbruck | Pairs |
World Championships
| Silver medal – second place | 1976 Gothenburg | Pairs |
| Silver medal – second place | 1975 Colorado Springs | Pairs |
| Bronze medal – third place | 1974 Munich | Pairs |
European Championships
| Silver medal – second place | 1976 Geneva | Pairs |
| Silver medal – second place | 1975 Copenhagen | Pairs |
| Silver medal – second place | 1974 Zagreb | Pairs |

Romy Kermer (later Oesterreich; born 28 July 1956) is a German figure skating coach and former competitive pair skater. With Rolf Oesterreich, she is the 1976 Olympic silver medalist.

== Personal life ==
Romy Kermer was born on 28 July 1956 in Karl-Marx-Stadt (Chemnitz), Bezirk Karl-Marx-Stadt, East Germany. After marrying Rolf Oesterreich in late 1976, she changed her name to Romy Oesterreich.

== Career ==
Romy Kermer began skating in Karl-Marx-Stadt, where she became a pair skater. Early in her career, she competed with Tassilo Thierbach and Andreas Forner.

1972 she moved to Berlin and skated there at the club SC Dynamo Berlin. Her coach was Heidemarie Seiner-Walther. She continued to represent SC Karl-Marx-Stadt until 1973, when she changed clubs as well. Her pair skating partner became Rolf Oesterreich. Kermer/Oesterreich won the silver medal at the Winter Olympics 1976 in Innsbruck. In March 1976, they were both awarded the Patriotic Order of Merit for their Olympic success.

Romy Oesterreich became a figure skating coach at the club SC Berlin. One of her students, Philipp Tischendorf, won the bronze medal at the Junior Grand Prix 2005 in Bratislava.

== Results ==
=== With Rolf Oesterreich ===
International
| Event | 1973 | 1974 | 1975 | 1976 |
|---|---|---|---|---|
| Winter Olympics | | | | 2nd |
| World Championships | 5th | 3rd | 2nd | 2nd |
| European Champ. | 5th | 2nd | 2nd | 2nd |
National
| East German Champ. | 1st | 2nd | 1st | 1st |

=== With Andreas Forner ===
International
| Event | 1972–72 |
|---|---|
| Blue Swords | 2nd |
| Prize of Moscow News | 6th |
