= Birgit Lorenz =

East German pair skater

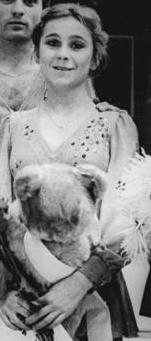
- Birgit Lorenz, 1981

Personal information
- Born: 20 August 1963 (age 63) East Berlin, East Germany
- Height: 4 ft 11 in (150 cm)

Figure skating career
- Country: East Germany
Medal record
Representing East Germany
Pairs' Figure skating
European Championships
Bronze medal – third place	1984 Budapest	Pairs
Bronze medal – third place	1983 Dortmund	Pairs

Birgit Lorenz (born 20 August 1963 in East Berlin, East Germany) is a former East German pair skater who competed with Knut Schubert. They won the gold medal at the East German Figure Skating Championships in 1981 and 1985, and captured the silver medal in four additional years. The couple won the bronze at the European Figure Skating Championships in 1983 and 1984 and finished fifth at the 1984 Winter Olympic Games. They also finished a career-best sixth place at the 1984 World Figure Skating Championships.

== Results ==
(with Schubert)

International
Event	78–79	79–80	80–81	81–82	82–83	83–84	84–85	85–86
Olympics						5th		
Worlds			9th	7th	8th	6th		
Europeans			4th	5th	3rd	3rd	4th	
NHK Trophy				2nd			2nd	
Blue Swords	5th	4th	2nd	1st	1st	1st		
Prague Skate	4th	3rd	1st					
Ennia Challenge					2nd	1st		
Moscow News		4th		5th				
National
East Germany	4th	5th	1st	2nd	2nd	2nd	1st	2nd
