= Tobias Schröter =

German pair skater

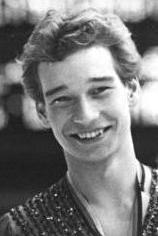
- Schröter in 1985

Personal information
- Born: 12 May 1964 (age 62) Dresden, East Germany
- Height: 6 ft 0 in (183 cm)

Figure skating career
- Country: East Germany
Medal record
Representing East Germany
Pairs' Figure skating
European Championships
| Bronze medal – third place | 1987 Sarajevo | Pairs |

Tobias Schröter (born 12 May 1964) is a former German pair skater. With partner Babette Preußler, he won the bronze medal at the 1984 East German Figure Skating Championships. The pair finished 11th at the 1984 Winter Olympics, sixth at that year's European Figure Skating Championships, and ninth at that year's World Figure Skating Championships.

Schröter later teamed up with Katrin Kanitz. They won the gold medal at the East German Championships in 1986 and 1987 and the bronze medal at the 1987 European Championships.

== Results ==
=== With Preußler ===
International
| Event | 1983–84 |
|---|---|
| Winter Olympics | 11th |
| World Championships | 11th |
| European Championships | 9th |
| Blue Swords | 2nd |
National
| East German Championships | 3rd |

=== With Kanitz ===
International
| Event | 1985–86 | 1986–87 |
|---|---|---|
| World Championships | 9th | |
| European Championships | 4th | 3rd |
| Prize of Moscow News | | 5th |
| Skate Canada International | | 6th |
National
| East German Champ. | 1st | 1st |
