= Rolf Österreich =

East German pair skater

Rolf Oesterreich
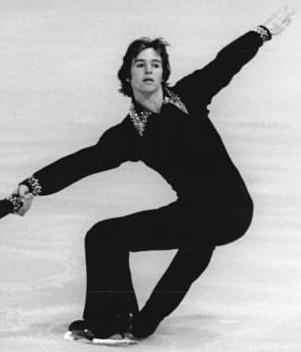
- Oesterreich in 1974

Personal information
- Born: 28 November 1952 (age 73) Rostock, Bezirk Rostock, East Germany
- Height: 184 cm (6 ft 0 in)

Figure skating career
- Country: East Germany
- Retired: 1976
Medal record
Representing East Germany
Pairs' figure skating
Olympic Games
Silver medal – second place	1976 Innsbruck	Pairs
World Championships
Silver medal – second place	1976 Gothenburg	Pairs
Silver medal – second place	1975 Colorado Springs	Pairs
Bronze medal – third place	1974 Munich	Pairs
European Championships
Silver medal – second place	1976 Geneva	Pairs
Silver medal – second place	1975 Copenhagen	Pairs
Silver medal – second place	1974 Zagreb	Pairs

Rolf Oesterreich (born 28 November 1952 in Rostock, East Germany) is a German figure skating coach and former competitor. With Romy Kermer, he is the 1976 Olympic silver medalist.

Oesterreich began skating in Berlin. He first teamed up with Marlies Radunsky. From 1972 on he skated with Romy Kermer. He skated for the club SC Dynamo Berlin and was representing East Germany. His coach was Heidemarie Seiner-Walther.

Romy Kermer and Rolf Oesterreich won the silver medal at the Winter Olympics 1976 in Innsbruck. In March 1976, they were both awarded the Patriotic Order of Merit for their Olympic success.

After their figure skating career they married each other. Oesterreich now works as a figure skating coach at the club TUS Stuttgart.

== Results ==
=== Pairs with Kermer ===
International
Event	1973	1974	1975	1976
Winter Olympics				2nd
World Championships	5th	3rd	2nd	2nd
European Champ.	5th	2nd	2nd	2nd
National
East German Champ.	1st	2nd	1st	1st

=== Pairs with Radunsky ===
International
Event	1970–71	1971–72
European Championships	6th	7th
Prize of Moscow News	7th	
National
East German Championships	3rd	3rd

=== Men's singles ===
International
Event	1967–68
Prague Skate	6th

== See also ==
- Figure Skating
- World Figure Skating Championships
