= Robin Jones (figure skater) =

British figure skater

Personal information
- Full name: Christopher Robin Jones
- Born: 17 June 1943
- Died: 30 March 1986 (aged 42)

Figure skating career
- Country: United Kingdom
- Retired: 1962

Christopher Robin Jones (17 June 1943 — 30 March 1986) was a British figure skater. He was a two-time British national champion and competed at the 1960 Winter Olympics, finishing 12th. He placed as high as sixth at the European Championships (1961).

== Competitive highlights ==
International
Event	1960	1961	1962
Winter Olympics	12th		
World Championships	14th		12th
European Championships	10th	6th	7th
National
British Championships	1st		1st
