= Ralph Borghard =

German former figure skater

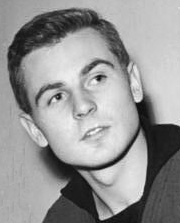
- Borghard in 1962.

Personal information
- Born: 17 April 1944 (age 82) Rostock, Mecklenburg-Vorpommern, Germany

Figure skating career
- Country: East Germany; West Germany
- Skating club: Sportclub Dynamo Berlin
- Retired: 1967

Ralph Borghard (born 17 April 1944) is a German former figure skater who represented East Germany for most of his career. He is the 1963 Blue Swords champion and a three-time East German national champion (1963, 1964, and 1966). His best result at an ISU Championship, sixth, came at the 1966 European Championships.

== Personal life ==
Ralph Borghard was born 17 April 1944 in Rostock. He became a dentist in Berlin.

== Career ==
Ralph Borghard represented East Germany and SC Dynamo Berlin for most of his career, coached by Inge Wischnewski. In 1962, he won the East German national silver medal and was given his first major international assignment, the 1962 European Championships. He finished 15th at the event in Geneva. The following season, he became the national champion and improved to 11th at Europeans.

In the 1963–64 season, Borghard won Blue Swords and his second national title. He qualified to represent the United Team of Germany at the 1964 Winter Olympics in Innsbruck and finished 11th.

In the 1965–66 season, Borghard won his third national title and finished sixth at the 1966 European Championships in Bratislava. His next assignment was the World Championships in Davos, Switzerland in late February 1966. After concluding the competition in 14th place, he decided not to return to East Germany and defected to West Germany.

In April 1966, it was reported that Borghard and a West German single skater, Uschi Keszler, had considered teaming up to compete in pairs. The two practiced some lifts together but her parents rejected the idea. Borghard returned to single skating and won the 1967 West German national silver medal before retiring from competition.

== Results ==
International
Event	1961–62	1962–63	1963–64	1964–65	1965–66	1966–67
Winter Olympics			11th			
World Champ.					14th	
European Champ.	15th	11th			6th	
Blue Swords			1st			
National
West German						2nd
East German	2nd	1st	1st		1st	
