= Margit Senf =

East German figure skater

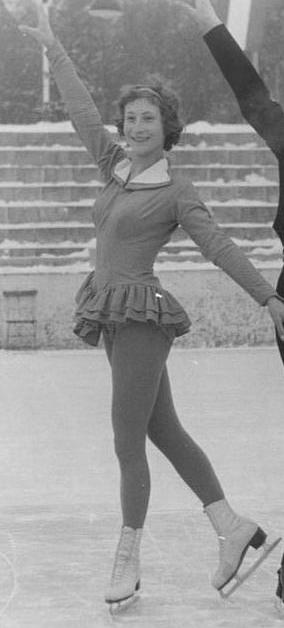
- Margit Senf, 1960

Personal information
- Born: 25 November 1945 (age 80) Leipzig, Saxony, Germany

Figure skating career
- Country: East Germany
Medal record
Representing East Germany
Pairs' Figure skating
European Championships
Bronze medal – third place	1961 West Berlin	Pairs

Margit Senf (born 25 November 1945 in Leipzig) is a former pair skater who represented East Germany and the United Team of Germany in competition. With partner Peter Göbel, she won the gold medal at the East German Figure Skating Championships in 1960, 1961, and 1963. In 1961, the pair won the bronze medal at the European Figure Skating Championships, and they also competed at the 1964 Winter Olympics, finishing 14th.

== Results ==
pairs with Göbel

International
Event	1960	1961	1962	1963	1964
Winter Olympics					4th
European Championships	8th	3rd		4th	
National
East German Championships	1st	1st		1st	3rd
