= Karin Frohner =

Austrian figure skater

Personal information
- Born: 29 May 1943 (age 83)

Figure skating career
- Country: Austria
Medal record
Representing Austria
Ladies' Figure skating
European Championships
Bronze medal – third place	1962 Geneva	Ladies' singles

Karin Frohner (born 29 May 1943) is a former Austrian figure skater who competed in ladies singles. She finished ninth at the 1960 Winter Olympics and won the bronze medal at the European Figure Skating Championships in 1962.

== Results ==
Event	1958	1959	1960	1961	1962
Winter Olympics			9th		
World Championships	11th		8th		8th
European Championships	7th		4th	4th	3rd
