= Babette Preußler =

East German pair skater

Babette Preußler (born 28 September 1968 in East Berlin, East Germany) is a former East German pair skater. With partner Torsten Ohlow, she won the bronze medal at the 1983 East German Figure Skating Championships. They went on to finish sixth at that year's European Figure Skating Championships and twelfth at the World Figure Skating Championships.

The next year, Preußler teamed with Tobias Schröter to win another bronze medal at the East German Championships. They finished eleventh at the 1984 Winter Olympics, sixth at the European Championships, and ninth at the World Championships.

== Results ==
=== With Schröter ===
International
Event	1983–84
Winter Olympics	11th
World Championships	11th
European Championships	9th
Blue Swords	2nd
National
East German Championships	3rd

=== With Ohlow ===
International
Event	1981–82	1982–83
World Championships		12th
European Championships		6th
Prague Skate		1st
Prize of Moscow News		9th
International: Junior
World Junior Champ.	3rd	
National
East German Champ.		3rd
