= Peter Göbel =

East German figure skater

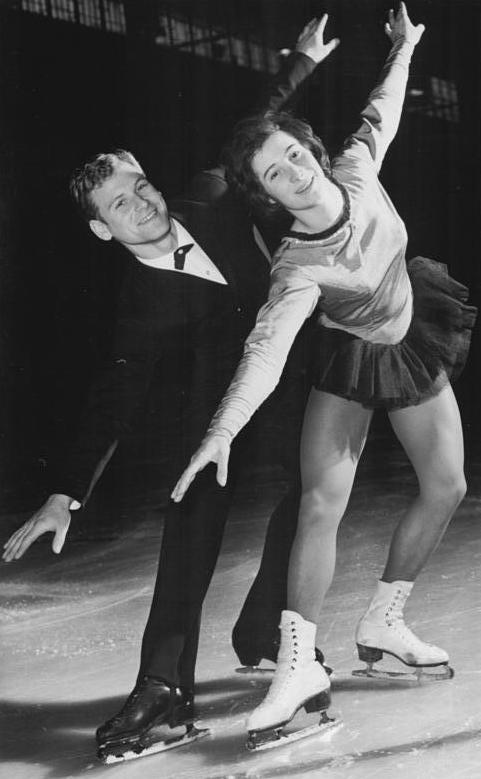
- Margit Senf and Peter Göbel, 1963

Personal information
- Born: 27 March 1941 (age 85) Berlin, Germany

Figure skating career
- Country: East Germany
- Partner: Margit Senf; Marianne Mirmsecker
Medal record
Figure skating: Pairs
Representing East Germany
European Championships
| Bronze medal – third place | 1961 West Berlin | Pairs |

Peter Göbel (born 27 March 1941 in Berlin) is a German former pair skater who represented East Germany and the United Team of Germany in competition. With partner Margit Senf, he won the gold medal at the East German Figure Skating Championships in 1960, 1961, and 1963. In 1961, the pair won the bronze medal at the European Figure Skating Championships, and they also competed at the 1964 Winter Olympics, finishing 14th. He later partnered with Marianne Mirmsecker.

== Results ==
=== With Senf ===
International
| Event | 1960 | 1961 | 1962 | 1963 | 1964 |
|---|---|---|---|---|---|
| Winter Olympics | | | | | 4th |
| European Championships | 8th | 3rd | | 4th | |
National
| East German Championships | 1st | 1st | | 1st | 3rd |

=== With Mirmsecker ===
International
| Event | 1966–67 |
|---|---|
| Blue Swords | 3rd |
| Prize of Moscow News | 4th |
