= Sandra Brugnera =

Italian figure skater (born 1943)

Personal information
- Born: 13 August 1943 (age 82)

Figure skating career
- Country: Italy

Sandra Brugnera (born 13 August 1943) is an Italian former figure skater who won three national titles in ladies' singles (1962–64). She competed at the 1964 Winter Olympics in Innsbruck, finishing 26th, and at nine ISU Championships, achieving her best result, 11th, at the 1962 Europeans in Geneva.

== Competitive highlights ==
International
Event	1961	1962	1963	1964	1965
Winter Olympics				26th	
World Champ.		18th	18th	19th	15th
European Champ.	22nd	11th	13th	14th	13th
National
Italian Champ.		1st	1st	1st	
