= Brigitte Wokoeck =

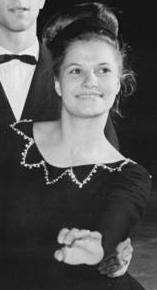
- Brigitte Wokoeck in 1963

Personal information
- Other names: Wocköck, Wockoeck
- Born: 22 February 1946 (age 80) Lübeck, Schleswig-Holstein, Germany
- Height: 1.64 m (5 ft 4 1/2 in)

Figure skating career
- Country: East Germany
- Retired: 1964

Brigitte Wokoeck (born 22 February 1946) is a former pair skater who represented East Germany and the United Team of Germany in competition. With partner Heinz-Ulrich Walther, she is the 1963 Blue Swords champion and a two-time East German national champion (1962, 1964). The pair competed at the 1964 Winter Olympics, finishing 11th.

== Competitive highlights ==
(with Walther)

International
Event	59–60	60–61	61–62	62–63	63–64
Winter Olympics					11th
European Champ.			6th	8th	
Blue Swords					1st
National
East German Champ.	3rd		1st	3rd	1st
