= Peggy Schwarz =

German pair skater

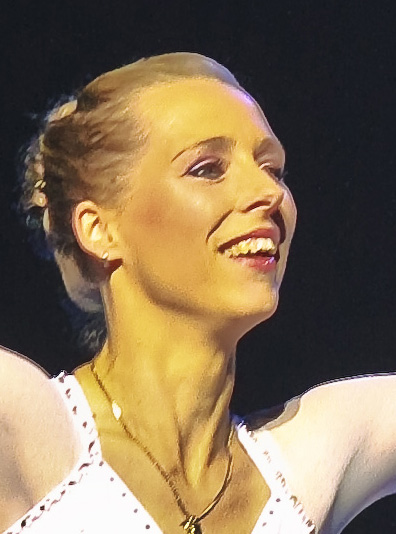
- Schwarz

Personal information
- Born: 4 September 1971 (age 55)
- Height: 4 ft 11 in (150 cm)

Figure skating career
- Country: Germany
- Retired: 2000
Medal record
Representing Germany
Pairs' Figure skating
World Championships
Bronze medal – third place	1998 Minneapolis	Pairs
Representing East Germany
European Championships
Bronze medal – third place	1988 Prague	Pairs

Peggy Schwarz (born 4 September 1971 in Berlin) is a German retired pair skater. She first gained prominence skating with Alexander König. The duo captured a bronze medal at the 1988 European Figure Skating Championships and then won gold at the German Figure Skating Championships in 1992. They also competed in the Winter Olympics three times, finishing 7th in 1988, 1992, and again in 1994.

Schwarz took a break from skating and gave birth to a son, Michel, in 1995. The following year, she joined forces with Mirko Müller. The pair went on to win three gold medals at the German nationals from 1998 to 2000. After competing in the 1998 Winter Olympics, they captured the bronze medal at the World Figure Skating Championships that year. Schwarz retired from skating in 2000.

== Programs ==
=== With Müller ===
Season	Short program	Free skating	Exhibition
1999–2000	New World by Jojo Büld	Patch Adams by Marc Shaiman	Delilah Blue by Joshua Kadison; Mission: Impossible
1998–1999	P.M. Undercover by The Rotosonics	Broken Arrow by Hans Zimmer	Ich dreh' mich um dich by Herbert Grönemeyer; Strong Enough by Cher; Broken Arrow by Hans Zimmer; Wind Beneath My Wings by Bette Midler
1997–1998	Preludin Fugue (from Rush) performed by Eric Clapton	Taj Mahal (from Last Dance) by Mark Isham	Bis ans Ende der Welt by Udo Lindenberg; Jailhouse Rock; Hey Bartender performed by The Blues Brothers; Leaving on a Jet Plane performed by Chantal Kreviazuk
1996–1997	Trouble Don't Last Always by Incognito, Carleen Anderson	Pulp Fiction; 12 Monkeys; Mission: Impossible	Song on Nefertiti's Radio (My Love) by Joshua Kadison; Lost Again; Ocean Club by Yello

== Results ==
GP: Champions Series / Grand Prix

=== With Müller ===
International
Event	1996–97	1997–98	1998–99	1999–00
Olympics		9th		
Worlds	10th	3rd	8th	8th
Europeans	6th	5th	4th	4th
GP Nations Cup		4th		
GP NHK Trophy		3rd	2nd	
GP Skate Canada	WD			
National
German Champ.	2nd	1st	1st	1st
WD = Withdrew

=== With König ===
International
Event	86–87	87–88	88–89	89–90	90–91	91–92	92–93	93–94
Olympics		7th				7th		7th
Worlds			4th	10th	7th	6th	12th	9th
Europeans		3rd		4th		5th	5th	7th
Nations Cup				2nd				
NHK Trophy					7th			
Skate America				3rd		3rd		
Skate Canada			2nd	4th				
National
Germany					2nd	1st	WD	2nd
East Germany	3rd	1st						
WD = Withdrew
