= Heinz-Ulrich Walther =

German former pair skater (born 1943)

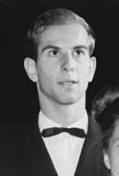
- Heinz-Ulrich Walther in 1963

Personal information
- Born: 11 March 1943 (age 83) Stendal, Province of Saxony, Prussia, Germany
- Height: 1.75 m (5 ft 9 in)

Figure skating career
- Country: East Germany; United Team of Germany
- Retired: 1970
Medal record
Representing East Germany
Figure skating: Pairs
World Championships
Bronze medal – third place	1970 Ljubljana	Pairs
European Championships
Bronze medal – third place	1970 Leningrad	Pairs
Bronze medal – third place	1968 Västerås	Pairs
Bronze medal – third place	1967 Ljubljana	Pairs

Heinz-Ulrich Walther (born 11 March 1943) is a German former pair skater who represented East Germany and the United Team of Germany in competition. With Heidemarie Steiner, he is the 1970 World bronze medalist and a three-time European bronze medalist (1967–68, 1970). Walther competed at two Winter Olympics, placing 11th in 1964 with Brigitte Wokoeck and fourth with Steiner in 1968.

== Skating career ==
Heinz-Ulrich Walther teamed up with Brigitte Wokoeck around 1959 and represented the club SC Dynamo Berlin. The pair won the 1963 Blue Swords and two East German national titles, in 1962 and 1964. Representing the United Team of Germany, they placed 11th at the 1964 Winter Olympics in Innsbruck. It was their final competition together.

Walther formed a partnership with Heidemarie Steiner by around 1965. Coached by Heinz-Friedrich Lindner, they represented SC Dynamo Berlin. The pair won the bronze medal at the 1967 European Championships in Ljubljana and repeated the following year at the 1968 European Championships in Västerås. They were selected to represent East Germany at the 1968 Winter Olympics in Grenoble and placed fourth. After obtaining their third European bronze medal at the 1970 European Championships in Leningrad, the pair concluded their competitive career with a World bronze medal, at the 1970 World Championships in Ljubljana.

Walther has worked as an international figure skating judge and ISU technical controller for pair skating.

== Personal life ==
Walther married Heidemarie Steiner in 1969. He studied medicine and worked at the Charité in Berlin. He was an academic employee in the orthopaedics department at the Center for Complementary Medicine Research – CCM.

== Competitive highlights ==
=== With Steiner ===
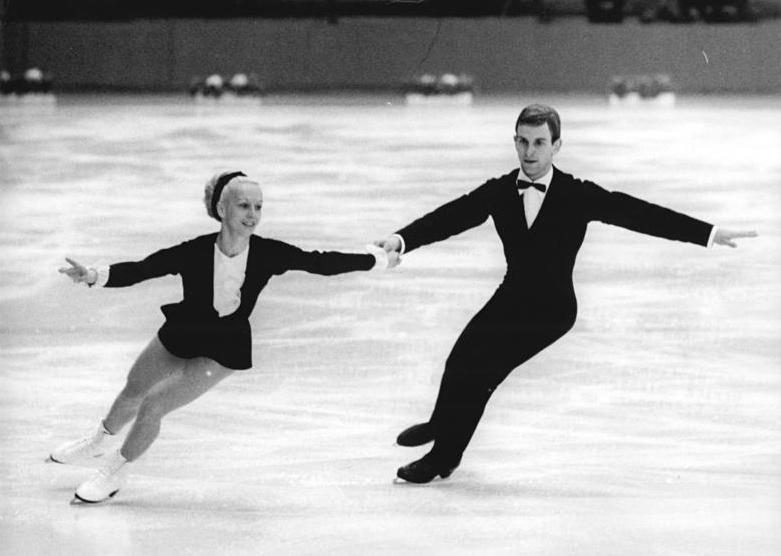
Steiner and Walther in 1969

International
Event	65–66	66–67	67–68	68–69	69–70
Winter Olympics			4th		
World Champ.	9th	5th	5th	5th	3rd
European Champ.	8th	3rd	3rd	4th	3rd
Prague Skate		3rd			
National
East Germany	1st	1st	2nd	1st	1st

=== With Wokoeck ===
International
Event	59–60	60–61	61–62	62–63	63–64
Winter Olympics					11th
European Champ.			6th	8th	
Blue Swords					1st
National
East German Champ.	3rd		1st	3rd	1st
