= Wouter Toledo =

Dutch figure skater (1944–2018)

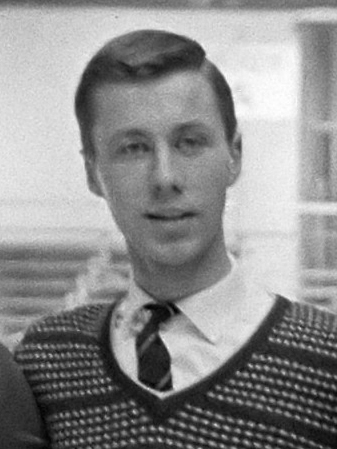
- Toledo in 1964

Personal information
- Born: 17 May 1944 The Hague, Netherlands
- Died: 21 July 2018 (aged 74)

Figure skating career
- Country: Netherlands

Wouter Maria Toledo (17 May 1944 - 21 July 2018) was a Dutch figure skater.

== Results ==
International
Event	1958	1959	1960	1961	1962	1963	1964
Olympics							WD
Worlds						19th	19th
Europeans	18th	17th		12th	20th	14th	14th
National
Dutch Champ.	1st	1st	1st	1st	1st	1st	1st
WD = Withdrew
