= Irene Müller =

East German pair skater

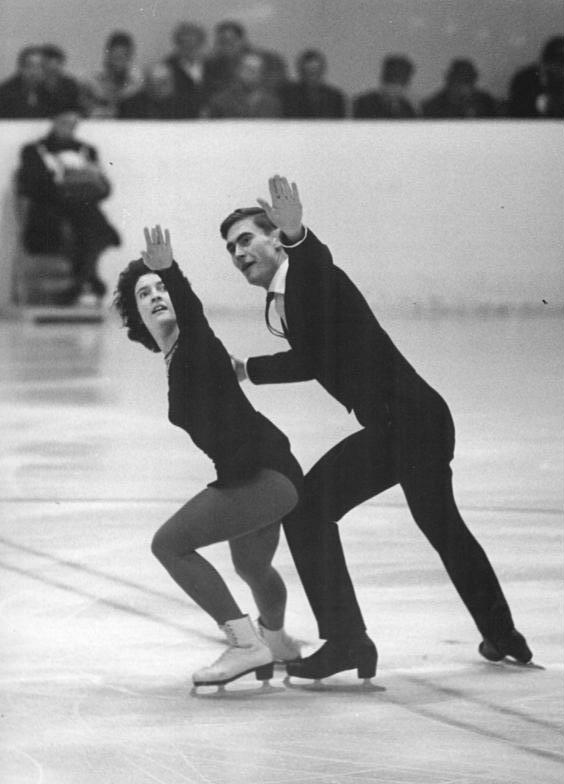
Irene Müller and Hans-Georg Dallmer, 1963

Irene Müller (born 13 August 1942 in Berlin) is a former East German pair skater who competed with partner Hans-Georg Dallmer. They won the gold medal at the East German Figure Skating Championships in 1965 and 1968 and finished ninth at the 1968 Winter Olympics. They finished fifth at the European Figure Skating Championships three times, and their best result at the World Figure Skating Championships was seventh in 1966.

== Results ==
pairs with Dallmer

International
Event	1960	1961	1962	1963	1964	1965	1966	1967	1968
Olympics									9th
Worlds			9th			8th	7th		9th
Europeans		9th	5th	10th		5th	5th	12th	7th
National
East Germany	2nd	2nd	2nd	2nd	2nd	1st			1st
