= List of figure skaters (pair skating) =

The following is a list of notable figure skaters who have competed in pair skating. These are skaters who have won a gold, silver, or bronze medal at at least one of the following competitions: the Winter Olympics, the World Figure Skating Championships, the European Figure Skating Championships, the Four Continents Figure Skating Championships, the Grand Prix of Figure Skating Final, the Winter Youth Olympics, the World Junior Figure Skating Championships, or the Junior Grand Prix Final; or who have won a gold medal at their national championships.

== A ==
Skater	Nation	Partner(s)	Major championships	Ref.
Sarah Abitbol	France	Stéphane Bernadis	(gold) French Championships (1994–2003)	
Sarah Abitbol	France	Stéphane Bernadis	(silver) European Championships (2002–03); Grand Prix Final (1999)	
Sarah Abitbol	France	Stéphane Bernadis	(bronze) World Championships (2000); European Championships (1996, 1998–2001)	
Marina Aganina	Uzbekistan	Artem Knyazev; Dmitry Zobnin	(gold) Uzbek Championships (2004–05, 2010)	
Marat Akbarov	Soviet Union	Veronica Pershina	(gold) Soviet Championships (1981); World Junior Championships (1979)	
Marat Akbarov	Soviet Union	Veronica Pershina	(bronze) European Championships (1985)	
Kseniia Akhanteva	Russia	Valerii Kolesov	(silver) World Junior Championships (2020)	
Kseniia Akhanteva	Russia	Valerii Kolesov	(bronze) Junior Grand Prix Final (2019)	
Vadim Akolzin	Israel	Julia Shapiro	(gold) Israeli Championships (2003–05)	
Ekaterina Alexandrovskaya	Australia	Harley Windsor	(gold) Australian Championships (2017, 2019); World Junior Championships (2017); Junior Grand Prix Final (2017)	
Filippo Ambrosini	Italy	Rebecca Ghilardi	(gold) Italian Championships (2024)	
Filippo Ambrosini	Italy	Rebecca Ghilardi	(silver) European Championships (2023)	
Filippo Ambrosini	Italy	Rebecca Ghilardi	(bronze) European Championships (2024)	
An Yang	China	Zhao Rui	(gold) Chinese Championships (2006)	
Patrice Archetto	Canada	Anabelle Langlois	(silver) Four Continents Championships (2002)	
Amina Atakhanova	Russia	Ilia Spiridonov	(bronze) Junior Grand Prix Final (2015)	
Donna Atwood	United States	Eugene Turner	(gold) U.S. Championships (1941)	
Marina Avstriyskaya	Soviet Union	Yuri Kvashnin	(gold) World Junior Championships (1982–83)	

== B ==
Skater	Nation	Partner(s)	Major championships	Ref.
Tai Babilonia	United States	Randy Gardner	(gold) World Championships (1979); U.S. Championships (1976–80)	
Tai Babilonia	United States	Randy Gardner	(bronze) World Championships (1977–78)	
Sherwin Badger	United States	Beatrix Loughran	(gold) U.S. Championships (1930–32)	
Sherwin Badger	United States	Beatrix Loughran	(silver) Winter Olympics (1932)	
Sherwin Badger	United States	Beatrix Loughran	(bronze) World Championships (1930, 1932)	
Sabine Baeß	East Germany	Tassilo Thierbach	(gold) World Championships (1982); European Championships (1982–83); East German Championships (1979–80, 1982–84)	
Sabine Baeß	East Germany	Tassilo Thierbach	(silver) World Championships (1981, 1983); European Championships (1984)	
Sabine Baeß	East Germany	Tassilo Thierbach	(bronze) World Championships (1979, 1984); European Championships (1979)	
Ernst Baier	Germany	Maxi Herber	(gold) Winter Olympics (1936); World Championships (1936–39); European Championships (1935–39); German Championships (1934–36, 1938–41)	
Ernst Baier	Germany	Maxi Herber	(bronze) World Championships (1934)	
Sherri Baier	Canada	Robin Cowan	(gold) Canadian Championships (1978); World Junior Championships (1976)	
Lubov Bakirova	Belarus	Mikalai Kamianchuk	(gold) Belarusian Championships (2010–12)	
John Baldwin	United States	Rena Inoue	(gold) Four Continents Championships (2006); U.S. Championships (2004, 2006)	
John Baldwin	United States	Rena Inoue	(bronze) Four Continents Championships (2007)	
Miloslav Balun	Czechoslovakia	Soňa Balunová	(gold) Czechoslovak Championships (1950–55)	
Miloslav Balun	Czechoslovakia	Soňa Balunová	(bronze) European Championships (1954)	
Soňa Balunová	Czechoslovakia	Miloslav Balun	(gold) Czechoslovak Championships (1950–55)	
Soňa Balunová	Czechoslovakia	Miloslav Balun	(bronze) European Championships (1954)	
Sophia Baram	United States	Daniel Tioumentsev	(gold) World Junior Championships (2023)	
Sophia Baram	United States	Daniel Tioumentsev	(silver) Junior Grand Prix Final (2022)	
Ria Baran	Germany	Paul Falk	(gold) Winter Olympics (1952); World Championships (1951–52); European Championships (1951–52); German Championships (1947–52)	
Jeremy Barrett	United States	Caydee Denney	(gold) U.S. Championships (2010)	
Pierre Baugniet	Belgium	Micheline Lannoy	(gold) Winter Olympics (1948); World Championships (1947–48); European Championships (1947); Belgian Championships (1944–47)	
Hans-Jürgen Bäumler	West Germany	Marika Kilius	(gold) World Championships (1963–64); European Championships (1959–64); German Championships (1958–59, 1963–64)	
Hans-Jürgen Bäumler	West Germany	Marika Kilius	(silver) Winter Olympics (1960, 1964); World Championships (1959)	
Hans-Jürgen Bäumler	West Germany	Marika Kilius	(bronze) World Championships (1960)	
Vera Bazarova	Russia	Yuri Larionov	(gold) Russian Championships (2012)	
Vera Bazarova	Russia	Yuri Larionov	(silver) European Championships (2012); Grand Prix Final (2012); World Junior Championships (2007)	
Vera Bazarova	Russia	Yuri Larionov	(bronze) European Championships (2011, 2014)	
Lucrezia Beccari	Italy	Matteo Guarise	(gold) European Championships (2024)	
Elena Bechke	Soviet Union	Valery Kornienko; Denis Petrov	(gold) Soviet Championships (1992)	
Elena Bechke	Soviet Union	Valery Kornienko; Denis Petrov	(silver) European Championships (1991)	
Elena Bechke	Soviet Union	Valery Kornienko; Denis Petrov	(bronze) World Championships (1989); European Championships (1986)	
Elena Bechke	CIS	Valery Kornienko; Denis Petrov	(silver) Winter Olympics (1992); European Championships (1992)	
Ian Beharry	Canada	Katherine Bobak	(silver) Junior Grand Prix Final (2011)	
Andrei Bekh	Ukraine	Julia Beloglazova	(gold) Ukrainian Championships (2006)	
Julia Beloglazova	Ukraine	Andriy Bekh	(gold) Ukrainian Championships (2006)	
Ludmila Belousova	Soviet Union	Oleg Protopopov	(gold) Winter Olympics (1964, 1968); World Championships (1965–68); European Championships (1965–68); Soviet Championships (1962–64, 1966–68)	
Ludmila Belousova	Soviet Union	Oleg Protopopov	(silver) World Championships (1962–64); European Championships (1962–64, 1969)	
Ludmila Belousova	Soviet Union	Oleg Protopopov	(bronze) World Championships (1969)	
Kateřina Beránková	Czech Republic	Otto Dlabola	(gold) Czech Championships (1998–2000, 2002–04)	
Elena Berezhnaya	Russia	Anton Sikharulidze	(gold) Winter Olympics (2002); World Championships (1998–99); European Championships (1998, 2001); Grand Prix Final (1997); Russian Championships (1999–2002)	
Elena Berezhnaya	Russia	Anton Sikharulidze	(silver) Winter Olympics (1998); World Championships (2001); Grand Prix Final (1998, 2000–01)	
Elena Berezhnaya	Russia	Anton Sikharulidze	(bronze) European Championships (1997); Grand Prix Final (1999)	
Alfred Berger	Austria	Helene Engelmann	(gold) Winter Olympics (1924); World Championships (1922, 1924); Austrian Championships (1921–23)	
Stéphane Bernadis	France	Sarah Abitbol	(gold) French Championships (1994–2003)	
Stéphane Bernadis	France	Sarah Abitbol	(silver) European Championships (2002–03); Grand Prix Final (1999)	
Stéphane Bernadis	France	Sarah Abitbol	(bronze) World Championships (2000); European Championships (1996, 1998–2001)	
Stefania Berton	Italy	Ondřej Hotárek	(gold) Italian Championships (2011–14)	
Stefania Berton	Italy	Ondřej Hotárek	(bronze) European Championships (2013)	
Luka Berulava	Georgia	Alina Butaeva; Anastasia Metelkina; Karina Safina	(gold) Winter Youth Olympics (2020); World Junior Championships (2022, 2024–25); Junior Grand Prix Final (2023)	
Luka Berulava	Georgia	Alina Butaeva; Anastasia Metelkina; Karina Safina	(silver) European Championships (2024)	
Luka Berulava	Georgia	Alina Butaeva; Anastasia Metelkina; Karina Safina	(bronze) Winter Youth Olympics (2020); European Championships (2025); Grand Prix Final (2024)	
Jozef Beständig	Slovakia	Oľga Beständigová	(gold) Slovak Championships (1996–2002, 2005)	
Oľga Beständigová	Slovakia	Jozef Beständig	(gold) Slovak Championships (1996–2002, 2005)	
Uwe Bewersdorf	East Germany	Manuela Mager	(gold) East German Championships (1977–78)	
Uwe Bewersdorf	East Germany	Manuela Mager	(silver) World Championships (1978, 1980)	
Uwe Bewersdorf	East Germany	Manuela Mager	(bronze) Winter Olympics (1980); European Championships (1978)	
Konstantin Bezmaternikh	Russia	Ksenia Krasilnikova	(gold) World Junior Championships (2008); Junior Grand Prix Final (2007)	
Konstantin Bezmaternikh	Russia	Ksenia Krasilnikova	(silver) Junior Grand Prix Final (2006)	
Konstantin Bezmaternikh	Russia	Ksenia Krasilnikova	(bronze) World Junior Championships (2006–07); Junior Grand Prix Final (2008)	
Martin Bidař	Czech Republic	Anna Dušková; Barbora Kucianová Anna Valesi; Jelizaveta Žuková	(gold) Czech Championships (2020–21, 2024); World Junior Championships (2016)	
Martin Bidař	Czech Republic	Anna Dušková; Barbora Kucianová Anna Valesi; Jelizaveta Žuková	(silver) Winter Youth Olympics (2016); Junior Grand Prix Final (2015–16)	
Petr Bidař	Czech Republic	Klára Kadlecová	(gold) Czech Championships (2011)	
Charlie Bilodeau	Canada	Julianne Séguin	(gold) Junior Grand Prix Final (2014)	
Charlie Bilodeau	Canada	Julianne Séguin	(silver) World Junior Championships (2015)	
Zofia Bilorówna	Poland	Tadeusz Kowalski	(gold) Polish Championships (1927–35)	
Zofia Bilorówna	Poland	Tadeusz Kowalski	(bronze) European Championships (1934)	
J. Paul Binnebose	United States	Laura Handy	(silver) World Junior Championships (1999); Junior Grand Prix Final (1998)	
Matthew Blackmer	United States	Britney Simpson	(bronze) Junior Grand Prix Final (2011)	
Jérôme Blanchard	France	Sabrina Lefrançois	(gold) French Championships (2004)	
Ruben Blommaert	Germany	Annabelle Prölß; Mari Vartmann	(gold) German Championships (2013, 2017)	
Katherine Bobak	Canada	Ian Beharry	(silver) Junior Grand Prix Final (2011)	
Bodo Bockenauer	East Germany	Irene Müller	(gold) East German Championships (1958–59)	
Aleksandra Boikova	Russia	Dmitrii Kozlovskii	(gold) European Championships (2020); Russian Championships (2020, 2023)	
Aleksandra Boikova	Russia	Dmitrii Kozlovskii	(silver) World Junior Championships (2017)	
Aleksandra Boikova	Russia	Dmitrii Kozlovskii	(bronze) World Championships (2021); European Championships (2019, 2022); Junior Grand Prix Final (2016)	
Yannick Bonheur	France	Adeline Canac; Vanessa James; Marylin Pla	(gold) French Championships (2005–07, 2010–11)	
Ekaterina Borisova	Russia	Dmitry Sopot	(gold) Winter Youth Olympics (2016); Junior Grand Prix Final (2015)	
Ekaterina Borisova	Russia	Dmitry Sopot	(bronze) World Junior Championships (2016)	
Tom Bouvart	Switzerland	Oxana Vouillamoz	(gold) Swiss Championships (2025)	
Norris Bowden	Canada	Frances Dafoe	(gold) World Championships (1954–55); Canadian Championships (1952–55)	
Norris Bowden	Canada	Frances Dafoe	(silver) Winter Olympics (1956); World Championships (1953, 1956)	
Christopher Boyadji	Great Britain	Amani Fancy; Zoe Jones	(gold) British Championships (2014, 2016–20)	
Isabelle Brasseur	Canada	Lloyd Eisler	(gold) World Championships (1993); Canadian Championships (1989, 1991–94)	
Isabelle Brasseur	Canada	Lloyd Eisler	(silver) World Championships (1990–91, 1994)	
Isabelle Brasseur	Canada	Lloyd Eisler	(bronze) Winter Olympics (1992, 1994); World Championships (1992)	
Milica Brozović	Slovakia	Vladimir Futáš	(gold) Slovak Championships (2004)	
Rockne Brubaker	United States	Mary Beth Marley; Keauna McLaughlin; Mariel Miller	(gold) U.S. Championships (2008–09); World Junior Championships (2007); Junior Grand Prix Final (2006)	
Rockne Brubaker	United States	Mary Beth Marley; Keauna McLaughlin; Mariel Miller	(silver) Four Continents Championships (2010)	
Rockne Brubaker	United States	Mary Beth Marley; Keauna McLaughlin; Mariel Miller	(bronze) Four Continents Championships (2012); Junior Grand Prix Final (2004–05)	
Andrée Brunet	France	Pierre Brunet	(gold) Winter Olympics (1928, 1932); World Championships (1926, 1928, 1930, 1932); European Championships (1932); French Championships (1924–33, 1935)	
Andrée Brunet	France	Pierre Brunet	(silver) World Championships (1925)	
Andrée Brunet	France	Pierre Brunet	(bronze) Winter Olympics (1924)	
Jean-Pierre Brunet	United States	Donna J. Pospisil	(gold) U.S. Championships (1945–46)	
Pierre Brunet	France	Andrée Brunet	(gold) Winter Olympics (1928, 1932); World Championships (1926, 1928, 1930, 1932); European Championships (1932); French Championships (1924–33, 1935)	
Pierre Brunet	France	Andrée Brunet	(silver) World Championships (1925)	
Pierre Brunet	France	Andrée Brunet	(bronze) Winter Olympics (1924)	
Melitta Brunner	Austria	Ludwig Wrede	(gold) Austrian Championships (1923, 1930)	
Melitta Brunner	Austria	Ludwig Wrede	(silver) World Championships (1929–30)	
Melitta Brunner	Austria	Ludwig Wrede	(bronze) Winter Olympics (1928); World Championships (1928)	
Alexia Bryn	Norway	Yngvar Bryn	(gold) Norwegian Championships (1908–13, 1919–22)	
Alexia Bryn	Norway	Yngvar Bryn	(silver) Summer Olympics (1920); World Championships (1923)	
Yngvar Bryn	Norway	Alexia Bryn	(gold) Norwegian Championships (1908–13, 1919–22)	
Yngvar Bryn	Norway	Alexia Bryn	(silver) Summer Olympics (1920); World Championships (1923)	
Craig Buntin	Canada	Meagan Duhamel; Valérie Marcoux	(gold) Canadian Championships (2004–06)	
Craig Buntin	Canada	Meagan Duhamel; Valérie Marcoux	(bronze) Four Continents Championships (2004, 2010)	
Heinrich Burger	Germany	Anna Hübler	(gold) Summer Olympics (1908); World Championships (1908, 1910); German Championships (1907, 1909)	
Andrei Bushkov	Russia	Marina Eltsova	(gold) World Championships (1996); European Championships (1993, 1997); Russian Championships (1995, 1997–98)	
Andrei Bushkov	Russia	Marina Eltsova	(silver) World Championships (1997); Grand Prix Final (1995)	
Andrei Bushkov	Russia	Marina Eltsova	(bronze) World Championships (1994); Grand Prix Final (1996)	
Alina Butaeva	Georgia	Luka Berulava	(gold) Winter Youth Olympics (2020)	
Alina Butaeva	Georgia	Luka Berulava	(bronze) Winter Youth Olympics (2020)	

== C ==
Skater	Nation	Partner(s)	Major championships	Ref.
Ashley Cain	United States	Timothy LeDuc	(gold) U.S. Championships (2019, 2022)	
Ashley Cain	United States	Timothy LeDuc	(silver) Four Continents Championships (2018)	
André Calame	Switzerland	Eliane Steinemann	(gold) Swiss Championships (1949–51)	
André Calame	Switzerland	Eliane Steinemann	(silver) European Championships (1950–51)	
Adeline Canac	France	Yannick Bonheur; Maximin Coia	(gold) French Championships (2008–09, 2011)	
Kitty Carruthers	United States	Peter Carruthers	(gold) U.S. Championships (1981–84)	
Kitty Carruthers	United States	Peter Carruthers	(silver) Winter Olympics (1984)	
Kitty Carruthers	United States	Peter Carruthers	(bronze) World Championships (1982)	
Peter Carruthers	United States	Kitty Carruthers	(gold) U.S. Championships (1981–84)	
Peter Carruthers	United States	Kitty Carruthers	(silver) Winter Olympics (1984)	
Peter Carruthers	United States	Kitty Carruthers	(bronze) World Championships (1982)	
Brooke Castile	United States	Benjamin Okolski	(gold) U.S. Championships (2007)	
Brooke Castile	United States	Benjamin Okolski	(bronze) Four Continents Championships (2008)	
Marissa Castelli	United States	Simon Shnapir	(gold) U.S. Championships (2013–14)	
Marissa Castelli	United States	Simon Shnapir	(bronze) Winter Olympics (2014); Four Continents Championships (2013); World Junior Championships (2009)	
Gabriela Čermanová	Slovakia	Martin Hanulák	(gold) Slovak Championships (2009–10)	
Emily Chan	United States	Spencer Akira Howe	(silver) Four Continents Championships (2022–23)	
Marina Cherkasova	Soviet Union	Sergei Shakhrai	(gold) World Championships (1980); European Championships (1979); Soviet Championships (1978–79)	
Marina Cherkasova	Soviet Union	Sergei Shakhrai	(silver) Winter Olympics (1980); World Championships (1979); European Championships (1978, 1980)	
Marina Cherkasova	Soviet Union	Sergei Shakhrai	(bronze) European Championships (1977, 1981)	
Evgenia Chernyshyova	Soviet Union	Dmitri Sukhanov	(gold) World Junior Championships (1989)	
Evgenia Chernyshyova	Soviet Union	Dmitri Sukhanov	(silver) World Junior Championships (1988)	
Jeanne Chevalier	Canada	Norman M. Scott	(gold) Canadian Championships (1914); U.S. Championships (1914)	
Mateusz Chruściński	Poland	Joanna Sulej	(gold) Polish Championships (2009–10)	
Ioulia Chtchetinina	Switzerland	Mikhail Akulov; Noah Scherer	(gold) Swiss Championships (2017–18)	
Ioulia Chtchetinina	Hungary	Márk Magyar	(gold) Hungarian Championships (2020–22)	
Ioulia Chtchetinina	Poland	Michał Woźniak	(gold) Polish Championships (2024–25)	
Tatiana Chuvaeva	Ukraine	Dmytro Palamarchuk	(gold) Ukrainian Championships (2002–03)	
Morgan Ciprès	France	Vanessa James	(gold) European Championships (2019); Grand Prix Final (2018); French Championships (2013–17, 2019)	
Morgan Ciprès	France	Vanessa James	(bronze) World Championships (2018); European Championships (2017)	
Filippo Clerici	Finland	Milania Väänänen	(gold) Finnish Championships (2023–25)	
Leslie Cliff	Great Britain	Violet Cliff	(silver) European Championships (1936)	
Leslie Cliff	Great Britain	Violet Cliff	(bronze) World Championships (1936–37)	
Violet Cliff	Great Britain	Leslie Cliff	(silver) European Championships (1936)	
Violet Cliff	Great Britain	Leslie Cliff	(bronze) World Championships (1936–37)	
Joyce Coates	Great Britain	Anthony Holles	(gold) British Championships (1956–59)	
Joyce Coates	Great Britain	Anthony Holles	(bronze) European Championships (1958–59)	
Michela Cobisi	Italy	Ruben De Pra	(gold) Italian Championships (2001–02)	
Maximin Coia	France	Adeline Canac	(gold) French Championships (2008–09)	
Paige Conners	Israel	Evgeni Krasnopolski	(gold) Israeli Championships (2018)	
Sara Conti	Italy	Niccolò Macii	(gold) European Championships (2023); Italian Championships (2023, 2025)	
Sara Conti	Italy	Niccolò Macii	(silver) Grand Prix Final (2023, 2025); European Championships (2025)	
Sara Conti	Italy	Niccolò Macii	(bronze) World Championships (2023, 2025); Grand Prix Final (2022)	
Thornton Coolidge	United States	Maribel Vinson	(gold) U.S. Championships (1928–29)	
John Coughlin	United States	Caydee Denney; Caitlin Yankowskas	(gold) U.S. Championships (2011–12)	
John Coughlin	United States	Caydee Denney; Caitlin Yankowskas	(silver) Four Continents Championships (2012)	
Robin Cowan	Canada	Sherri Baier	(gold) Canadian Championships (1978); World Junior Championships (1976)	
Greta Crafoord	Sweden	John Crafoord	(gold) Swedish Championships (2023–25)	
John Crafoord	Sweden	Greta Crafoord	(gold) Swedish Championships (2023–25)	

== D ==
Skater	Nation	Partner(s)	Major championships	Ref.
Frances Dafoe	Canada	Norris Bowden	(gold) World Championships (1954–55); Canadian Championships (1952–55)	
Frances Dafoe	Canada	Norris Bowden	(silver) Winter Olympics (1956); World Championships (1953, 1956)	
Hans-Georg Dallmer	East Germany	Irene Müller	(gold) East German Championships (1965)	
Daria Danilova	Netherlands	Michel Tsiba	(gold) Dutch Championships (2020, 2022, 2025)	
Tatiana Danilova	Belarus	Mikalai Kamianchuk	(gold) Belarusian Championships (2016–17)	
Wolfgang Danne	West Germany	Margot Glockshuber	(gold) German Championships (1967–68)	
Wolfgang Danne	West Germany	Margot Glockshuber	(silver) World Championships (1967); European Championships (1967)	
Wolfgang Danne	West Germany	Margot Glockshuber	(bronze) Winter Olympics (1968); European Championships (1966)	
Artem Darenskyi	Ukraine	Sofiia Holichenko; Sofiia Nesterova	(gold) Ukrainian Championships (2018–19, 2022–24)	
Artem Darenskyi	Ukraine	Sofiia Holichenko; Sofiia Nesterova	(bronze) Winter Youth Olympics (2020)	
Vasilisa Davankova	Russia	Andrei Deputat	(silver) Junior Grand Prix Final (2012)	
Vasilisa Davankova	Russia	Andrei Deputat	(bronze) World Junior Championships (2012)	
Bryce Davison	Canada	Jessica Dubé	(gold) Canadian Championships (2007, 2009–10); Junior Grand Prix Final (2003)	
Bryce Davison	Canada	Jessica Dubé	(silver) Four Continents Championships (2009); World Junior Championships (2004–05)	
Bryce Davison	Canada	Jessica Dubé	(bronze) World Championships (2008)	
Caydee Denney	United States	Jeremy Barrett; John Coughlin	(gold) U.S. Championships (2010, 2012)	
Caydee Denney	United States	Jeremy Barrett; John Coughlin	(silver) Four Continents Championships (2012)	
Haven Denney	United States	Brandon Frazier	(gold) U.S. Championships (2017); World Junior Championships (2013)	
Nicole Della Monica	Italy	Matteo Guarise; Yannick Kocon	(gold) Italian Championships (2009–10, 2016–22)	
Ruben De Pra	Italy	Michela Cobisi	(gold) Italian Championships (2001–02)	
Andrei Deputat	Russia	Vasilisa Davankova	(silver) Junior Grand Prix Final (2012)	
Andrei Deputat	Russia	Vasilisa Davankova	(bronze) World Junior Championships (2012)	
Maxime Deschamps	Canada	Deanna Stellato-Dudek	(gold) World Championships (2024); Four Continents Championships (2024); Canadian Championships (2023–25)	
Maxime Deschamps	Canada	Deanna Stellato-Dudek	(silver) Four Continents Championships (2025)	
Maxime Deschamps	Canada	Deanna Stellato-Dudek	(bronze) Four Continents Championships (2023); Grand Prix Final (2023)	
Wallace Diestelmeyer	Canada	Suzanne Morrow Francis; Joyce Perkins	(gold) Canadian Championships (1946–48)	
Wallace Diestelmeyer	Canada	Suzanne Morrow Francis; Joyce Perkins	(bronze) Winter Olympics (1948); World Championships (1948)	
Luke Digby	Great Britain	Anastasia Vaipan-Law	(gold) British Championships (2022–26)	
Rezső Dillinger	Hungary	Lucy Galló	(bronze) World Championships (1935); European Championships (1935)	
Ding Yang	China	Ren Zhongfei	(gold) Chinese Championships (2005); Junior Grand Prix Final (2002)	
Ding Yang	China	Ren Zhongfei	(silver) World Junior Championships (2003)	
Ding Yang	China	Ren Zhongfei	(bronze) World Junior Championships (2002); Junior Grand Prix Final (2001)	
Suzanne Diskeuve	Belgium	Edmond Verbustel	(bronze) World Championships (1947); European Championships (1947)	
Otto Dlabola	Czech Republic	Kateřina Beránková; Veronika Joukalová	(gold) Czech Championships (1995–96, 1998–2000, 2002–04)	
Artur Dmitriev	Soviet Union	Oksana Kazakova; Natalia Mishkutionok	(gold) World Championships (1991); European Championships (1991)	
Artur Dmitriev	Soviet Union	Oksana Kazakova; Natalia Mishkutionok	(bronze) World Championships (1990); European Championships (1989–90)	
Artur Dmitriev	CIS	Oksana Kazakova; Natalia Mishkutionok	(gold) Winter Olympics (1992); World Championships (1992); European Championships (1992)	
Artur Dmitriev	Russia	Oksana Kazakova; Natalia Mishkutionok	(gold) Winter Olympics (1998); European Championships (1996)	
Artur Dmitriev	Russia	Oksana Kazakova; Natalia Mishkutionok	(silver) Winter Olympics (1994); European Championships (1998); Grand Prix Final (1996)	
Artur Dmitriev	Russia	Oksana Kazakova; Natalia Mishkutionok	(bronze) World Championships (1997); European Championships (1994); Grand Prix Final (1997)	
Zdeněk Doležal	Czechoslovakia	Věra Suchánková	(gold) European Championships (1957–58); Czechoslovak Championships (1956–58)	
Zdeněk Doležal	Czechoslovakia	Věra Suchánková	(silver) World Championships (1958); European Championships (1955)	
Jennifer Don	United States	Jonathon Hunt	(bronze) World Junior Championships (2003); Junior Grand Prix Final (2002)	
Dong Huibo	China	Wu Yiming	(gold) Chinese Championships (2009)	
Dong Huibo	China	Wu Yiming	(bronze) World Junior Championships (2008)	
Antoine Dorsaz	Switzerland	Anaïs Morand	(gold) Swiss Championships (2008–10)	
Jessica Dubé	Canada	Bryce Davison; Samuel Tetrault	(gold) Canadian Championships (2007, 2009–10); Junior Grand Prix Final (2003)	
Jessica Dubé	Canada	Bryce Davison; Samuel Tetrault	(silver) Four Continents Championships (2009); World Junior Championships (2004–05); Junior Grand Prix Final (2002)	
Jessica Dubé	Canada	Bryce Davison; Samuel Tetrault	(bronze) World Championships (2008)	
Meagan Duhamel	Canada	Craig Buntin; Eric Radford	(gold) Winter Olympics (2018); World Championships (2015–16); Four Continents Championships (2013, 2015); Grand Prix Final (2014); Canadian Championships (2012–18)	
Meagan Duhamel	Canada	Craig Buntin; Eric Radford	(silver) Winter Olympics (2014); Four Continents Championships (2011, 2017); Grand Prix Final (2015)	
Meagan Duhamel	Canada	Craig Buntin; Eric Radford	(bronze) Winter Olympics (2018); World Championships (2013–14); Four Continents Championships (2010); Grand Prix Final (2016–17)	
Philip Dulebohn	United States	Tiffany Scott	(gold) U.S. Championships (2003)	
Philip Dulebohn	United States	Tiffany Scott	(bronze) Four Continents Championships (2000)	
Jason Dungjen	United States	Susan Dungjen; Kyoko Ina	(gold) U.S. Championships (1997–98)	
Jason Dungjen	United States	Susan Dungjen; Kyoko Ina	(silver) World Junior Championships (1984)	
Susan Dungjen	United States	Jason Dungjen	(silver) World Junior Championships (1984)	
Anna Dušková	Czech Republic	Martin Bidař	(gold) World Junior Championships (2016)	
Anna Dušková	Czech Republic	Martin Bidař	(silver) Winter Youth Olympics (2016); Junior Grand Prix Final (2015–16)	

== E ==
Skater	Nation	Partner(s)	Major championships	Ref.
Galina Efremenko	Ukraine	Evgeni Zhigurski	(bronze) World Junior Championships (1994)	
Lloyd Eisler	Canada	Isabelle Brasseur; Katherina Matousek	(gold) World Championships (1993); Canadian Championships (1984, 1989, 1991–94)	
Lloyd Eisler	Canada	Isabelle Brasseur; Katherina Matousek	(silver) World Championships (1990–91, 1994); World Junior Championships (1981)	
Lloyd Eisler	Canada	Isabelle Brasseur; Katherina Matousek	(bronze) Winter Olympics (1992, 1994); World Championships (1985, 1992)	
Marina Eltsova	Russia	Andrei Bushkov	(gold) World Championships (1996); European Championships (1993, 1997); Russian Championships (1995, 1997–98)	
Marina Eltsova	Russia	Andrei Bushkov	(silver) World Championships (1997); Grand Prix Final (1995)	
Marina Eltsova	Russia	Andrei Bushkov	(bronze) World Championships (1994); Grand Prix Final (1996)	
Alexander Enbert	Russia	Natalia Zabiiako	(silver) Winter Olympics (2018)	
Alexander Enbert	Russia	Natalia Zabiiako	(bronze) World Championships (2019); European Championships (2018)	
Helene Engelmann	Austria	Alfred Berger; Karl Mejstrik	(gold) Winter Olympics (1924); World Championships (1913, 1922, 1924); Austrian Championships (1913, 1921–23)	
Helene Engelmann	Austria	Alfred Berger; Karl Mejstrik	(silver) World Championships (1914)	

== F ==
Skater	Nation	Partner(s)	Major championships	Ref.
Paul Falk	Germany	Ria Baran	(gold) Winter Olympics (1952); World Championships (1951–52); European Championships (1951–52); German Championships (1947–52)	
Amani Fancy	Great Britain	Christopher Boyadji	(gold) British Championships (2014, 2016)	
Lenny Faustino	Canada	Jacinthe Larivière	(gold) Canadian Championships (2003)	
Jean-Sébastien Fecteau	Canada	Caroline Haddad; Utako Wakamatsu	(silver) Four Continents Championships (2006); World Junior Championships (1992, 1994)	
Lina Fedorova	Russia	Maxim Miroshkin	(gold) Junior Grand Prix Final (2012)	
Lina Fedorova	Russia	Maxim Miroshkin	(silver) Winter Youth Olympics (2012); Junior Grand Prix Final (2014)	
Lina Fedorova	Russia	Maxim Miroshkin	(bronze) World Junior Championships (2013, 2015); Junior Grand Prix Final (2013)	
Evgenia Filonenko	Ukraine	Igor Marchenko	(gold) Ukrainian Championships (1996–98)	
Evgenia Filonenko	Ukraine	Igor Marchenko	(silver) World Junior Championships (1996)	
Evgenia Filonenko	Ukraine	Igor Marchenko	(bronze) World Junior Championships (1995)	
Eva-Maria Fitze	Germany	Rico Rex	(gold) German Championships (2003)	
Olivia Flores	United States	Luke Wang	(silver) World Junior Championships (2024); Junior Grand Prix Final (2024)	
Jerry Fotheringill	United States	Judianne Fotheringill	(gold) U.S. Championships (1963–64)	
Judianne Fotheringill	United States	Jerry Fotheringill	(gold) U.S. Championships (1963–64)	
Bernard Fox	United States	Joan Tozzer	(gold) U.S. Championships (1938–40)	
Josée France	Canada	Paul Mills	(gold) World Junior Championships (1977)	
Brandon Frazier	United States	Haven Denney; Alexa Knierim	(gold) Winter Olympics (2022); World Championships (2022); U.S. Championships (2017, 2021, 2023); World Junior Championships (2013)	
Brandon Frazier	United States	Haven Denney; Alexa Knierim	(silver) World Championships (2023); Grand Prix Final (2022)	
Vladimir Futáš	Slovakia	Milica Brozović	(gold) Slovak Championships (2004)	

== G ==
Skater	Nation	Partner(s)	Major championships	Ref.
Rudy Galindo	United States	Kristi Yamaguchi	(gold) U.S. Championships (1989–90); World Junior Championships (1988)	
Rudy Galindo	United States	Kristi Yamaguchi	(bronze) World Junior Championships (1987)	
Aleksandr Galliamov	Russia	Anastasia Mishina	(gold) World Championships (2021); European Championships (2022); Russian Championships (2022, 2024–25); World Junior Championships (2019); Junior Grand Prix Final (2018)	
Aleksandr Galliamov	Russia	Anastasia Mishina	(bronze) Winter Olympics (2022); Grand Prix Final (2019); World Junior Championships (2018)	
Lucy Galló	Hungary	Rezső Dillinger	(bronze) World Championships (1935); European Championships (1935)	
Hamish Gaman	Great Britain	Caitlin Yankowskas	(gold) British Championships (2015)	
Isabella Gamez	Philippines	Alexander Korovin	(gold) Philippine Championships (2033–24)	
Randy Gardner	United States	Tai Babilonia	(gold) World Championships (1979); U.S. Championships (1976–80)	
Randy Gardner	United States	Tai Babilonia	(bronze) World Championships (1977–78)	
Alexander Gavrilov	Soviet Union	Tamara Moskvina; Tatyana Zhuk	(gold) Soviet Championships (1960, 1965)	
Alexander Gavrilov	Soviet Union	Tamara Moskvina; Tatyana Zhuk	(bronze) World Championships (1963); European Championships (1963–64)	
Rebecca Ghilardi	Italy	Filippo Ambrosini	(gold) Italian Championships (2024)	
Rebecca Ghilardi	Italy	Filippo Ambrosini	(silver) European Championships (2023)	
Rebecca Ghilardi	Italy	Filippo Ambrosini	(bronze) European Championships (2024)	
Hektor Giotopoulos Moore	Australia	Anastasia Golubeva	(gold) Australian Championships (2024); Junior Grand Prix Final (2022)	
Hektor Giotopoulos Moore	Australia	Anastasia Golubeva	(silver) World Junior Championships (2022–23)	
Anuschka Gläser	West Germany	Stefan Pfrengle	(gold) German Championships (1989–90)	
Anuschka Gläser	Germany	Axel Rauschenbach	(gold) German Championships (1994)	
Ilja Glebov	Estonia	Maria Sergejeva	(gold) Estonian Championships (2007–09)	
Margot Glockshuber	West Germany	Wolfgang Danne	(gold) German Championships (1967–68)	
Margot Glockshuber	West Germany	Wolfgang Danne	(silver) World Championships (1967); European Championships (1967)	
Margot Glockshuber	West Germany	Wolfgang Danne	(bronze) Winter Olympics (1968); European Championships (1966)	
Peter Göbel	East Germany	Margit Senf	(gold) East German Championships (1960–61, 1963)	
Peter Göbel	East Germany	Margit Senf	(bronze) European Championships (1961)	
Margret Göbl	West Germany	Franz Ningel	(gold) German Championships (1960–62)	
Margret Göbl	West Germany	Franz Ningel	(silver) European Championships (1961)	
Margret Göbl	West Germany	Franz Ningel	(bronze) World Championships (1962); European Championships (1960, 1962)	
Egor Golovkin	Russia	Tatiana Kokoreva	(bronze) World Junior Championships (2005)	
Anastasia Golubeva	Australia	Hektor Giotopoulos Moore	(gold) Australian Championships (2024); Junior Grand Prix Final (2022)	
Anastasia Golubeva	Australia	Hektor Giotopoulos Moore	(silver) World Junior Championships (2022–23)	
Ekaterina Gordeeva	Soviet Union	Sergei Grinkov	(gold) Winter Olympics (1988); World Championships (1986–87, 1989–90); European Championships (1988, 1990); Soviet Championships (1987); World Junior Championships (1985)	
Ekaterina Gordeeva	Soviet Union	Sergei Grinkov	(silver) World Championships (1988); European Championships (1986)	
Ekaterina Gordeeva	Russia	Sergei Grinkov	(gold) Winter Olympics (1994); European Championships (1994); Russian Championships (1994)	
Aleksandr Gorelik	Soviet Union	Tatyana Zhuk	(silver) Winter Olympics (1968); World Championships (1966, 1968); European Championships (1966, 1968)	
Aleksandr Gorelik	Soviet Union	Tatyana Zhuk	(bronze) World Championships (1965); European Championships (1965)	
Michel Grandjean	Switzerland	Silvia Grandjean	(gold) European Championships (1954); Swiss Championships (1952–54)	
Michel Grandjean	Switzerland	Silvia Grandjean	(silver) World Championships (1954)	
Silvia Grandjean	Switzerland	Michel Grandjean	(gold) European Championships (1954); Swiss Championships (1952–54)	
Silvia Grandjean	Switzerland	Michel Grandjean	(silver) World Championships (1954)	
Robin Greiner	United States	Carole Ormaca	(gold) U.S. Championships (1953–56)	
Sergei Grinkov	Soviet Union	Ekaterina Gordeeva	(gold) Winter Olympics (1988); World Championships (1986–87, 1989–90); European Championships (1988, 1990); Soviet Championships (1987); World Junior Championships (1985)	
Sergei Grinkov	Soviet Union	Ekaterina Gordeeva	(silver) World Championships (1988); European Championships (1986)	
Sergei Grinkov	Russia	Ekaterina Gordeeva	(gold) Winter Olympics (1994); European Championships (1994); Russian Championships (1994)	
Manuela Groß	East Germany	Uwe Kagelmann	(gold) East German Championships (1971–72, 1974)	
Manuela Groß	East Germany	Uwe Kagelmann	(bronze) Winter Olympics (1972, 1976); World Championships (1973, 1975); European Championships (1972, 1975)	
Matteo Guarise	Italy	Lucrezia Beccari; Nicole Della Monica	(gold) European Championships (2024); Italian Championships (2016–22)	

== H ==
Skater	Nation	Partner(s)	Major championships	Ref.
Caroline Haddad	Canada	Jean-Sébastien Fecteau	(silver) World Junior Championships (1992, 1994)	
Rudy Halmaert	Czech Republic	Alexandra Herbríková	(gold) Czech Championships (2012)	
Han Cong	China	Sui Wenjing	(gold) Winter Olympics (2022); World Championships (2017, 2019); Four Continents Championships (2012, 2014, 2016–17, 2019–20); Grand Prix Final (2019); Chinese Championships (2010–11); World Junior Championships (2010–12); Junior Grand Prix Final (2009, 2011)	
Han Cong	China	Sui Wenjing	(silver) Winter Olympics (2018); World Championships (2015–16, 2021); Grand Prix Final (2017)	
Han Cong	China	Sui Wenjing	(bronze) Grand Prix Final (2010, 2014)	
Laura Handy	United States	J. Paul Binnebose	(silver) World Junior Championships (1999); Junior Grand Prix Final (1998)	
Martin Hanulák	Slovakia	Gabriela Čermanová	(gold) Slovak Championships (2009–10)	
Danielle Hartsell	United States	Steve Hartsell	(gold) U.S. Championships (1999); World Junior Championships (1997)	
Danielle Hartsell	United States	Steve Hartsell	(silver) World Junior Championships (1995)	
Danielle Hartsell	United States	Steve Hartsell	(bronze) Four Continents Championships (1999)	
Steve Hartsell	United States	Danielle Hartsell	(gold) U.S. Championships (1999); World Junior Championships (1997)	
Steve Hartsell	United States	Danielle Hartsell	(silver) World Junior Championships (1995)	
Steve Hartsell	United States	Danielle Hartsell	(bronze) Four Continents Championships (1999)	
Minerva Fabienne Hase	Germany	Nolan Seegert Nikita Volodin	(gold) European Championships (2025); Grand Prix Final (2023–24); German Championships (2019–20, 2022, 2024–25)	
Minerva Fabienne Hase	Germany	Nolan Seegert Nikita Volodin	(silver) World Championships (2025)	
Minerva Fabienne Hase	Germany	Nolan Seegert Nikita Volodin	(bronze) World Championships (2024); Grand Prix Final (2025)	
Cody Hay	Canada	Anabelle Langlois	(gold) Canadian Championships (2008)	
Sonja Henie	Norway	Arne Lie	(gold) Norwegian Championships (1926–28)	
Maxi Herber	Germany	Ernst Baier	(gold) Winter Olympics (1936); World Championships (1936–39); European Championships (1935–39); German Championships (1934–36, 1938–41)	
Maxi Herber	Germany	Ernst Baier	(bronze) World Championships (1934)	
Alexandra Herbríková	Czech Republic	Rudy Halmaert	(gold) Czech Championships (2012)	
Alexandra Herbríková	Switzerland	Nicolas Roulet	(gold) Swiss Championships (2015–16, 2019–20)	
George Hill	United States	Maribel Vinson	(gold) U.S. Championships (1933, 1935–37)	
Sofiia Holichenko	Ukraine	Artem Darenskyi	(gold) Ukrainian Championships (2022–24)	
Gisela Hochhaltinger	Austria	Otto Preißecker	(bronze) European Championships (1930)	
Annika Hocke	Germany	Robert Kunkel	(gold) German Championships (2023)	
Annika Hocke	Germany	Robert Kunkel	(bronze) European Championships (2023)	
Anthony Holles	Great Britain	Joyce Coates	(bronze) European Championships (1958–59)	
Ondřej Hotárek	Italy	Stefania Berton; Laura Magitteri; Valentina Marchei	(gold) Italian Championships (2007–08, 2011–15)	
Ondřej Hotárek	Italy	Stefania Berton; Laura Magitteri; Valentina Marchei	(bronze) European Championships (2013)	
Spencer Akira Howe	United States	Emily Chan	(silver) Four Continents Championships (2022–23)	
Anna Hübler	Germany	Heinrich Burger	(gold) Summer Olympics (1908); World Championships (1908, 1910); German Championships (1907, 1909)	
Jonathon Hunt	United States	Jennifer Don	(bronze) World Junior Championships (2003); Junior Grand Prix Final (2002)	

== I ==
Skater	Nation	Partner(s)	Major championships	Ref.
Dmitrii Ialin	Russia	Polina Kostiukovich	(silver) World Junior Championships (2018); Junior Grand Prix Final (2018)	
Liubov Ilyushechkina	Canada	Dylan Moscovitch	(bronze) Four Continents Championships (2017)	
Liubov Ilyushechkina	Russia	Nodari Maisuradze	(gold) World Junior Championships (2009); Junior Grand Prix Final (2008)	
Liubov Ilyushechkina	Russia	Nodari Maisuradze	(silver) World Junior Championships (2008)	
Kyoko Ina	United States	Jason Dungjen; John Zimmerman	(gold) U.S. Championships (1997–98, 2000–02)	
Kyoko Ina	United States	Jason Dungjen; John Zimmerman	(silver) Four Continents Championships (2000)	
Kyoko Ina	United States	Jason Dungjen; John Zimmerman	(bronze) World Championships (2002); Four Continents Championships (2001)	
Rena Inoue	Japan	Tomoaki Koyama	(gold) Japan Championships (1991–92)	
Rena Inoue	United States	John Baldwin	(gold) Four Continents Championships (2006); U.S. Championships (2004, 2006)	
Rena Inoue	United States	John Baldwin	(bronze) Four Continents Championships (2007)	

== J ==
Skater	Nation	Partner(s)	Major championships	Ref.
Ludowika Jakobsson	Finland	Walter Jakobsson	(gold) Summer Olympics (1920)	
Ludowika Jakobsson	Finland	Walter Jakobsson	(silver) Winter Olympics (1924)	
Walter Jakobsson	Finland	Ludowika Jakobsson	(gold) Summer Olympics (1920)	
Walter Jakobsson	Finland	Ludowika Jakobsson	(silver) Winter Olympics (1924)	
Vanessa James	France	Yannick Bonheur; Morgan Ciprès	(gold) European Championships (2019); Grand Prix Final (2018); French Championships (2010, 2013–17, 2019)	
Vanessa James	France	Yannick Bonheur; Morgan Ciprès	(bronze) World Championships (2018); European Championships (2017)	
Vanessa James	Canada	Eric Radford	(bronze) World Championships (2022)	
Ji Min-ji	South Korea	Themistocles Leftheris	(gold) South Korean Championships (2016–17)	
Jin Yang	China	Peng Cheng; Yu Xiaoyu	(gold) Chinese Championships (2013, 2015, 2017, 2019–20); Winter Youth Olympics (2012); World Junior Championships (2014–15); Junior Grand Prix Final (2013)	
Jin Yang	China	Peng Cheng; Yu Xiaoyu	(silver) Four Continents Championships (2020); Grand Prix Final (2018–19); World Junior Championships (2012)	
Jin Yang	China	Peng Cheng; Yu Xiaoyu	(bronze) Four Continents Championships (2016, 2019); Junior Grand Prix Final (2010)	
Gerda Johner	Switzerland	Rüdi Johner	(gold) Swiss Championships (1957–65)	
Gerda Johner	Switzerland	Rüdi Johner	(silver) European Championships (1965)	
Rüdi Johner	Switzerland	Gerda Johner	(gold) Swiss Championships (1957–65)	
Rüdi Johner	Switzerland	Gerda Johner	(silver) European Championships (1965)	
James H. Johnson	Great Britain	Phyllis Johnson	(silver) Summer Olympics (1908)	
Phyllis Johnson	Great Britain	James H. Johnson; Basil Williams	(silver) Summer Olympics (1908)	
Phyllis Johnson	Great Britain	James H. Johnson; Basil Williams	(bronze) Summer Olympics (1920)	
Zoe Jones	Great Britain	Christopher Boyadji	(gold) British Championships (2017–20)	
Jong Yong-hyok	North Korea	Paek Mi-hyang; Sung Mi-hyang	(gold) North Korean Championships (2004, 2007–10)	
Ronald Joseph	United States	Vivian Joseph	(gold) U.S. Championships (1965)	
Ronald Joseph	United States	Vivian Joseph	(bronze) Winter Olympics (1964)	
Vivian Joseph	United States	Ronald Joseph	(gold) U.S. Championships (1965)	
Vivian Joseph	United States	Ronald Joseph	(bronze) Winter Olympics (1964)	

== K ==
Skater	Nation	Partner(s)	Major championships	Ref.
Klára Kadlecová	Czech Republic	Petr Bidař	(gold) Czech Championships (2011)	
Rashid Kadyrkaev	Soviet Union	Marina Nikitiuk	(silver) World Junior Championships (1980)	
Uwe Kagelmann	East Germany	Manuela Groß	(gold) East German Championships (1971–72, 1974)	
Uwe Kagelmann	East Germany	Manuela Groß	(bronze) Winter Olympics (1972, 1976); World Championships (1973, 1975); European Championships (1972, 1975)	
Otto Kaiser	Austria	Lilly Scholz	(silver) Winter Olympics (1928)	
Ellie Kam	United States	Daniel O'Shea	(gold) U.S. Championships (2024)	
Ellie Kam	United States	Daniel O'Shea	(bronze) Four Continents Championships (2024)	
Mikalai Kamianchuk	Belarus	Lubov Bakirova; Tatiana Danilova	(gold) Belarusian Championships (2010–12, 2016–17)	
Katrin Kanitz	East Germany	Tobias Schröter	(gold) East German Championships (1986–87)	
Katrin Kanitz	East Germany	Tobias Schröter	(bronze) European Championships (1987)	
Julia Karbovskaya	Russia	Sergei Slavnov	(silver) World Junior Championships (2002); Junior Grand Prix Final (2001)	
Galina Karelina	Soviet Union	Georgi Proskurin	(bronze) European Championships (1971)	
Janusz Karweta	Poland	Krystyna Klimczak	(gold) Polish Championships (2008)	
Cynthia Kauffman	United States	Ronald Kauffman	(gold) U.S. Championships (1966–69)	
Ronald Kauffman	United States	Cynthia Kauffman	(gold) U.S. Championships (1966–69)	
Yuko Kavaguti	Japan	Alexander Markuntsov	(gold) Japan Championships (2002–03)	
Yuko Kavaguti	Japan	Alexander Markuntsov	(silver) World Junior Championships (2001)	
Yuko Kavaguti	Japan	Alexander Markuntsov	(bronze) Junior Grand Prix Final (2000)	
Yuko Kavaguti	Russia	Alexander Smirnov	(gold) European Championships (2010, 2015); Russian Championships (2008–10)	
Yuko Kavaguti	Russia	Alexander Smirnov	(silver) European Championships (2009, 2011)	
Yuko Kavaguti	Russia	Alexander Smirnov	(bronze) World Championships (2009–10); European Championships (2008); Grand Prix Final (2011, 2015)	
Yukiko Kawasaki	Japan	Alexei Tikhonov	(gold) Japan Championships (1993–94)	
Tarah Kayne	United States	Daniel O'Shea	(gold) Four Continents Championships (2014); U.S. Championships (2016)	
Tarah Kayne	United States	Daniel O'Shea	(silver) Four Continents Championships (2014)	
Oksana Kazakova	Russia	Artur Dmitriev	(gold) Winter Olympics (1998); European Championships (1996)	
Oksana Kazakova	Russia	Artur Dmitriev	(silver) European Championships (1998); Grand Prix Final (1996)	
Oksana Kazakova	Russia	Artur Dmitriev	(bronze) Grand Prix Final (2018)	
Andrea Kékesy	Hungary	Ede Király	(gold) European Championships (1948–49)	
Andrea Kékesy	Hungary	Ede Király	(silver) Winter Olympics (1948)	
Stacey Kemp	Great Britain	David King	(gold) British Championships (2006–13)	
Karol Kennedy	United States	Peter Kennedy	(gold) U.S. Championships (1948–52)	
Karol Kennedy	United States	Peter Kennedy	(silver) Winter Olympics (1952)	
Peter Kennedy	United States	Karol Kennedy	(gold) U.S. Championships (1948–52)	
Peter Kennedy	United States	Karol Kennedy	(silver) Winter Olympics (1952)	
Romy Kermer	East Germany	Rolf Österreich	(gold) East German Championships (1973, 1975–76)	
Romy Kermer	East Germany	Rolf Österreich	(silver) Winter Olympics (1976); European Championships (1974–76)	
Marina Khalturina	Kazakhstan	Valeriy Artyukhov	(gold) Kazakhstani Championships (2000)	
Petro Kharchenko	Ukraine	Tatiana Volosozhar	(gold) Ukrainian Championships (2004)	
Denis Khodykin	Russia	Daria Pavliuchenko	(gold) World Junior Championships (2018)	
Denis Khodykin	Russia	Daria Pavliuchenko	(bronze) European Championships (2020); Junior Grand Prix Final (2017)	
Dmitri Khromin	Poland	Dominika Piątkowska	(gold) Polish Championships (2005–07)	
Severin Kiefer	Austria	Stina Martini; Miriam Ziegler	(gold) Austrian Championships (2011–16, 2018, 2020–22)	
Ryuichi Kihara	Japan	Riku Miura; Miu Suzaki; Narumi Takahashi	(gold) World Championships (2023, 2025); Four Continents Championships (2023, 2025); Grand Prix Final (2022, 2025); Japan Championships (2014–15, 2018–20, 2025)	
Ryuichi Kihara	Japan	Riku Miura; Miu Suzaki; Narumi Takahashi	(silver) Winter Olympics (2022); World Championships (2022, 2024); Four Continents Championships (2024); Grand Prix Final (2024)	
Marika Kilius	West Germany	Hans-Jürgen Bäumler Franz Ningel	(gold) World Championships (1963–64); European Championships (1959–64); German Championships (1955–59, 1963–64)	
Marika Kilius	West Germany	Hans-Jürgen Bäumler Franz Ningel	(silver) Winter Olympics (1960, 1964); World Championships (1957, 1959)	
Marika Kilius	West Germany	Hans-Jürgen Bäumler Franz Ningel	(bronze) World Championships (1955–57, 1960); European Championships (1955–57)	
Kim Ju-sik	North Korea	Ryom Tae-ok	(gold) North Korean Championships (2017–21)	
Kim Ju-sik	North Korea	Ryom Tae-ok	(bronze) Four Continents Championships (2018)	
David King	Great Britain	Stacey Kemp	(gold) British Championships (2006–13)	
Ede Király	Hungary	Andrea Kékesy	(gold) European Championships (1948–49)	
Ede Király	Hungary	Andrea Kékesy	(silver) Winter Olympics (1948)	
Krystyna Klimczak	Poland	Janusz Karweta	(gold) Polish Championships (2008)	
Fedor Klimov	Russia	Ksenia Stolbova	(gold) Winter Olympics (2014); Grand Prix Final (2015)	
Fedor Klimov	Russia	Ksenia Stolbova	(silver) Winter Olympics (2014); World Championships (2014); European Championships (2014–15, 2018); Grand Prix Final (2014); Russian Championships (2014–15, 2017); World Junior Championships (2011); Junior Grand Prix Final (2010)	
Fedor Klimov	Russia	Ksenia Stolbova	(bronze) European Championships (2012); World Junior Championships (2010)	
Lenka Knapová	Czechoslovakia	René Novotný	(gold) Czechoslovak Championships (1985–88)	
Alexa Knierim	United States	Brandon Frazier; Chris Knierim	(gold) Winter Olympics (2022); World Championships (2022); U.S. Championships (2015, 2018, 2020–21, 2023)	
Alexa Knierim	United States	Brandon Frazier; Chris Knierim	(silver) World Championships (2023); Four Continents Championships (2016); Grand Prix Final (2022)	
Alexa Knierim	United States	Brandon Frazier; Chris Knierim	(bronze) Winter Olympics (2018); Four Continents Championships (2014)	
Chris Knierim	United States	Alexa Knierim	(gold) U.S. Championships (2015, 2018, 2020)	
Chris Knierim	United States	Alexa Knierim	(silver) Four Continents Championships (2016); Grand Prix Final (2023)	
Chris Knierim	United States	Alexa Knierim	(bronze) Winter Olympics (2018); Four Continents Championships (2014)	
Blažena Knittlová	Czechoslovakia	Karel Vosátka	(silver) European Championships (1948)	
Artem Knyazev	Uzbekistan	Marina Aganina	(gold) Uzbek Championships (2004–05)	
Inge Koch	Germany	Günther Noack	(bronze) World Championships (1938–39); European Championships (1938–39)	
Yannick Kocon	Italy	Nicole Della Monica	(gold) Italian Championships (2009–10)	
Tatiana Kokoreva	Russia	Egor Golovkin	(bronze) World Junior Championships (2005)	
Valerii Kolesov	Russia	Kseniia Akhanteva	(silver) World Junior Championships (2020)	
Valerii Kolesov	Russia	Kseniia Akhanteva	(bronze) Junior Grand Prix Final (2019)	
Pieter Kollen	United States	Dorothyann Nelson	(gold) U.S. Championships (1962)	
Alexander König	East Germany	Peggy Schwarz	(gold) East German Championships (1988)	
Alexander König	East Germany	Peggy Schwarz	(bronze) European Championships (1988)	
Hailey Kops	Israel	Evgeni Krasnopolski	(gold) Israeli Championships (2022)	
Valery Kornienko	Soviet Union	Elena Bechke	(bronze) European Championships (1985)	
Alexander Korovin	Philippines	Isabella Gamez	(gold) Philippine Championships (2033–24)	
Inga Korshunova	Russia	Dmitry Saveliev	(gold) World Junior Championships (1993)	
Kateryna Kostenko	Ukraine	Roman Talan	(gold) Ukrainian Championships (2009)	
Polina Kostiukovich	Russia	Dmitrii Ialin	(silver) World Junior Championships (2018); Junior Grand Prix Final(2018)	
Tadeusz Kowalski	Poland	Zofia Bilorówna	(gold) Polish Championships (1927–35)	
Tadeusz Kowalski	Poland	Zofia Bilorówna	(bronze) European Championships (1934)	
Radka Kovaříková	Czechoslovakia	René Novotný	(gold) Czechoslovak Championships (1989–90)	
Radka Kovaříková	Czechoslovakia	René Novotný	(silver) World Championships (1992)	
Radka Kovaříková	Czech Republic	René Novotný	(gold) World Championships (1995); Czech Championships (1994)	
Radka Kovaříková	Czech Republic	René Novotný	(silver) European Championships (1995)	
Tomoaki Koyama	Japan	Rena Inoue	(gold) Japan Championships (1991–92)	
Dmitrii Kozlovskii	Russia	Aleksandra Boikova	(gold) European Championships (2020); Russian Championships (2020, 2023)	
Dmitrii Kozlovskii	Russia	Aleksandra Boikova	(silver) World Junior Championships (2017)	
Dmitrii Kozlovskii	Russia	Aleksandra Boikova	(bronze) World Championships (2021); European Championships (2019, 2022); Junior Grand Prix Final (2016)	
Evgeni Krasnopolski	Israel	Paige Conners; Hailey Kops; Adel Tankova; Anna Vernikov	(gold) Israeli Championships (2016, 2018, 2020, 2022)	
Ksenia Krasilnikova	Russia	Konstantin Bezmaternikh	(gold) World Junior Championships (2008); Junior Grand Prix Final (2007)	
Ksenia Krasilnikova	Russia	Konstantin Bezmaternikh	(silver) Junior Grand Prix Final (2006)	
Ksenia Krasilnikova	Russia	Konstantin Bezmaternikh	(bronze) World Junior Championships (2006–07); Junior Grand Prix Final (2008)	
Maria Krasiltseva	Armenia	Artem Znachkov	(gold) Armenian Championships (2003–04)	
Gennadi Krasnitski	Soviet Union	Elena Leonova	(gold) World Junior Championships (1986–87)	
Natalia Krestianinova	Soviet Union	Alexei Torchinski	(gold) World Junior Championships (1990–92)	
Andrei Krukov	Azerbaijan	Inga Rodionova	(gold) Azerbaijani Championships (2000)	
Henryk Krukowicz-Przedrzymirski	Poland	Olga Przedrzymirska	(gold) Polish Championships (1922–24)	
Michaela Krutská	Czech Republic	Marek Sedlmajer	(gold) Czech Championships (2001)	
Natasha Kuchiki	United States	Todd Sand	(gold) U.S. Championships (1991)	
Natasha Kuchiki	United States	Todd Sand	(bronze) World Championships (1991)	
Sergei Kulbach	Estonia	Natalia Zabiiako	(gold) Estonian Championships (2011)	
Sergei Kulbach	Ukraine	Elizaveta Usmantseva	(gold) Ukrainian Championships (2013)	
Robert Kunkel	Germany	Annika Hocke	(gold) German Championships (2023)	
Robert Kunkel	Germany	Annika Hocke	(bronze) European Championships (2023)	
Christian Künzle	Switzerland	Karin Künzle	(gold) Swiss Championships (1970–76)	
Karin Künzle	Switzerland	Christian Künzle	(gold) Swiss Championships (1970–76)	
Hans Kuster	Switzerland	Luny Unold	(gold) Swiss Championships (1946–48)	
Mikhail Kuznetsov	Russia	Ekaterina Sheremetieva	(silver) Junior Grand Prix Final (2007)	
Yuri Kvashnin	Soviet Union	Marina Avstriyskaya	(gold) World Junior Championships (1982–83)	

== L ==
Skater	Nation	Partner(s)	Major championships	Ref.
Manuela Landgraf	East Germany	Ingo Steuer	(gold) World Junior Championships (1984)	
Anabelle Langlois	Canada	Patrice Archetto; Cody Hay	(gold) Canadian Championships (2008)	
Anabelle Langlois	Canada	Patrice Archetto; Cody Hay	(silver) Four Continents Championships (2002)	
Micheline Lannoy	Belgium	Pierre Baugniet	(gold) Winter Olympics (1948); World Championships (1947–48); European Championships (1947); Belgian Championships (1944–47)	
Yuri Larionov	Russia	Vera Bazarova	(gold) Russian Championships (2012)	
Yuri Larionov	Russia	Vera Bazarova	(silver) European Championships (2012); Grand Prix Final (2012); World Junior Championships (2007)	
Yuri Larionov	Russia	Vera Bazarova	(bronze) European Championships (2011, 2014)	
Jacinthe Larivière	Canada	Lenny Faustino	(gold) Canadian Championships (2003)	
Paige Lawrence	Canada	Rudi Swiegers	(bronze) Four Continents Championships (2011)	
Pavel Lebedev	Russia	Natalia Shestakova	(gold) World Junior Championships (2004)	
Pavel Lebedev	Russia	Natalia Shestakova	(silver) Junior Grand Prix Final (2003)	
Timothy LeDuc	United States	Ashley Cain	(gold) U.S. Championships (2019, 2022)	
Timothy LeDuc	United States	Ashley Cain	(silver) Four Continents Championships (2018)	
Timothy Leemann	Switzerland	Anaïs Morand	(gold) Swiss Championships (2011–12)	
Sabrina Lefrançois	France	Jérôme Blanchard	(gold) French Championships (2004)	
Themistocles Leftheris	South Korea	Ji Min-ji	(gold) South Korean Championships (2016–17)	
Almut Lehmann	West Germany	Herbert Wiesinger	(gold) German Championships (1971–73)	
Almut Lehmann	West Germany	Herbert Wiesinger	(bronze) European Championships (1973)	
Stanislav Leonovich	Soviet Union	Marina Pestova	(gold) Soviet Championships (1980, 1982–83)	
Stanislav Leonovich	Soviet Union	Marina Pestova	(silver) World Championships (1982); European Championships (1982)	
Stanislav Leonovich	Soviet Union	Marina Pestova	(bronze) World Championships (1980); European Championships (1980)	
Elena Leonova	Soviet Union	Gennadi Krasnitski	(gold) World Junior Championships (1986–87)	
Marie-Pierre Leray	France	Frédéric Lipka	(gold) French Championships (1993)	
Serguei Likhanski	Soviet Union	Inna Utkina	(silver) World Junior Championships (1982)	
Serguei Likhanski	Soviet Union	Inna Utkina	(bronze) World Junior Championships (1983)	
Frédéric Lipka	France	Marie-Pierre Leray	(gold) French Championships (1993)	
Igor Lisovsky	Soviet Union	Irina Vorobieva	(gold) European Championships (1981)	
Igor Lisovsky	Soviet Union	Irina Vorobieva	(silver) European Championships (1977, 1979)	
Igor Lisovsky	Soviet Union	Irina Vorobieva	(bronze) European Championships (1982)	
Birgit Lorenz	East Germany	Knut Schubert	(gold) East German Championships (1981, 1985)	
Birgit Lorenz	East Germany	Knut Schubert	(bronze) European Championships (1983–84)	
Beatrix Loughran	United States	Sherwin Badger	(gold) U.S. Championships (1930–32)	
Beatrix Loughran	United States	Sherwin Badger	(silver) Winter Olympics (1932)	
Beatrix Loughran	United States	Sherwin Badger	(bronze) World Championships (1930, 1932)	
Audrey Lu	United States	Misha Mitrofanov	(gold) Four Continents Championships (2022)	
Garrett Lucash	United States	Katie Orscher	(gold) U.S. Championships (2005)	
Garrett Lucash	United States	Katie Orscher	(bronze) Four Continents Championships (2005)	
Nancy Ludington	United States	Ronald Ludington	(gold) U.S. Championships (1957–60)	
Nancy Ludington	United States	Ronald Ludington	(bronze) Winter Olympics (1960)	
Ronald Ludington	United States	Nancy Ludington	(gold) U.S. Championships (1957–60)	
Ronald Ludington	United States	Nancy Ludington	(bronze) Winter Olympics (1960)	

== M ==
Skater	Nation	Partner(s)	Major championships	Ref.
Niccolò Macii	Italy	Sara Conti	(gold) European Championships (2023); Italian Championships (2023, 2025)	
Niccolò Macii	Italy	Sara Conti	(silver) Grand Prix Final (2023, 2025); European Championships (2025)	
Niccolò Macii	Italy	Sara Conti	(bronze) World Championships (2023, 2025); Grand Prix Final (2022)	
Grace Madden	United States	J. Lester Madden	(gold) U.S. Championships (1934)	
J. Lester Madden	United States	Grace Madden	(gold) U.S. Championships (1934)	
Manuela Mager	East Germany	Uwe Bewersdorf	(gold) East German Championships (1977–78)	
Manuela Mager	East Germany	Uwe Bewersdorf	(silver) World Championships (1978, 1980)	
Manuela Mager	East Germany	Uwe Bewersdorf	(bronze) Winter Olympics (1980); European Championships (1978)	
Laura Magitteri	Italy	Ondřej Hotárek	(gold) Italian Championships (2007–08)	
Márk Magyar	Hungary	Ioulia Chtchetinina; Anna Marie Pearce	(gold) Hungarian Championships (2016, 2020–22)	
Nodari Maisuradze	Russia	Liubov Ilyushechkina	(gold) World Junior Championships (2009); Junior Grand Prix Final (2008)	
Nodari Maisuradze	Russia	Liubov Ilyushechkina	(silver) World Junior Championships (2008)	
Oleg Makarov	Soviet Union	Larisa Selezneva	(gold) European Championships (1987, 1989); Soviet Championships (1984–85, 1988–90); World Junior Championships (1980–81)	
Oleg Makarov	Soviet Union	Larisa Selezneva	(silver) World Championships (1985); European Championships (1985, 1988, 1990); World Junior Championships (1979)	
Oleg Makarov	Soviet Union	Larisa Selezneva	(bronze) Winter Olympics (1984); World Championships (1988)	
Victoria Maksyuta	Russia	Vladislav Zhovnirski	(gold) World Junior Championships (1996)	
Victoria Maksyuta	Russia	Vladislav Zhovnirski	(silver) Junior Grand Prix Final (1997)	
Victoria Maksyuta	Russia	Vladislav Zhovnirski	(bronze) World Junior Championships (1997–99); Junior Grand Prix Final (1998)	
Valentina Marchei	Italy	Ondřej Hotárek	(gold) Italian Championships (2015)	
Igor Marchenko	Ukraine	Evgenia Filonenko	(gold) Ukrainian Championships (1996–98)	
Igor Marchenko	Ukraine	Evgenia Filonenko	(silver) World Junior Championships (1996)	
Igor Marchenko	Ukraine	Evgenia Filonenko	(bronze) World Junior Championships (1995)	
Bruno Marcotte	Canada	Isabelle Coulombe	(bronze) World Junior Championships (1993)	
Valérie Marcoux	Canada	Craig Buntin	(gold) Canadian Championships (2004–06)	
Valérie Marcoux	Canada	Craig Buntin	(bronze) Four Continents Championships (2004)	
Michael Marinaro	Canada	Kirsten Moore-Towers; Margaret Purdy	(gold) Canadian Championships (2019–20, 2022)	
Michael Marinaro	Canada	Kirsten Moore-Towers; Margaret Purdy	(silver) Four Continents Championships (2019); World Junior Championships (2013)	
Michael Marinaro	Canada	Kirsten Moore-Towers; Margaret Purdy	(bronze) Four Continents Championships (2020)	
Maxim Marinin	Russia	Tatiana Totmianina	(gold) Winter Olympics (2006); World Championships (2004–05); European Championships (2002–06); Grand Prix Final (2002, 2005); Russian Championships (2003–05)	
Maxim Marinin	Russia	Tatiana Totmianina	(silver) World Championships (2002–03); European Championships (2001); Grand Prix Final (2003)	
Alexander Markuntsov	Japan	Yuko Kavaguti	(gold) Japan Championships (2002–03)	
Alexander Markuntsov	Japan	Yuko Kavaguti	(silver) World Junior Championships (2001)	
Alexander Markuntsov	Japan	Yuko Kavaguti	(bronze) Junior Grand Prix Final (2000)	
Mary Beth Marley	United States	Rockne Brubaker	(bronze) Four Continents Championships (2012)	
Paul Martini	Canada	Barbara Underhill	(gold) World Championships (1984); Canadian Championships (1979–83); World Junior Championships (1978)	
Paul Martini	Canada	Barbara Underhill	(bronze) World Championships (1983)	
Stina Martini	Austria	Severin Kiefer	(gold) Austrian Championships (2011–13)	
Anastasia Martiusheva	Russia	Alexei Rogonov	(silver) World Junior Championships (2009)	
Rocky Marval	United States	Calla Urbanski	(gold) U.S. Championships (1992–93)	
Bruno Massot	France	Daria Popova	(gold) French Championships (2012)	
Bruno Massot	Germany	Aljona Savchenko	(gold) Winter Olympics (2018); World Championships (2018); Grand Prix Final (2017); German Championships (2016, 2018)	
Bruno Massot	Germany	Aljona Savchenko	(silver) World Championships (2017); European Championships (2016–17)	
Bruno Massot	Germany	Aljona Savchenko	(silver) World Championships (2016)	
Katherina Matousek	Canada	Lloyd Eisler	(gold) Canadian Championships (1984)	
Katherina Matousek	Canada	Lloyd Eisler	(bronze) World Championships (1985)	
Keauna McLaughlin	United States	Rockne Brubaker	(gold) U.S. Championships (2008–09); World Junior Championships (2007); Junior Grand Prix Final (2006)	
Keauna McLaughlin	United States	Rockne Brubaker	(silver) Four Continents Championships (2010)	
Michael McPherson	United States	Kristen Roth	(silver) Junior Grand Prix Final (2000)	
Michael McPherson	United States	Kristen Roth	(bronze) World Junior Championships (2001)	
Drew Meekins	United States	Julia Vlassov	(gold) World Junior Championships (2006)	
Drew Meekins	United States	Julia Vlassov	(silver) Junior Grand Prix Final (2005)	
Karl Mejstrik	Austria	Helene Engelmann	(gold) World Championships (1913); Austrian Championships (1913)	
Karl Mejstrik	Austria	Helene Engelmann	(silver) World Championships (1914)	
Jenni Meno	United States	Todd Sand	(gold) U.S. Championships (1994–96)	
Jenni Meno	United States	Todd Sand	(silver) World Championships (1998)	
Jenni Meno	United States	Todd Sand	(bronze) World Championships (1995–96)	
Anastasiia Metelkina	Georgia	Luka Berulava	(gold) World Junior Championships (2024–25); Junior Grand Prix Final (2023)	
Anastasiia Metelkina	Georgia	Luka Berulava	(silver) European Championships (2024)	
Anastasiia Metelkina	Georgia	Luka Berulava	(bronze) European Championships (2025); Grand Prix Final (2025)	
Trennt Michaud	Canada	Lia Pereira Evelyn Walsh	(bronze) Four Continents Championships (2022, 2025)	
Mark Militano	United States	Melissa Militano	(gold) U.S. Championships (1973–75)	
Melissa Militano	United States	Mark Militano	(gold) U.S. Championships (1973–75)	
Paul Mills	Canada	Josée France	(gold) World Junior Championships (1977)	
Valdis Mintals	Estonia	Ekaterina Nekrassova; Viktoria Shklover	(gold) Estonian Championships (1996–97, 1999–2002)	
Irina Mironenko	Soviet Union	Dmitri Shkidchenko	(silver) World Junior Championships (1985–86)	
Ilya Mironov	Russia	Diana Mukhametzianova	(silver) Winter Youth Olympics (2020); Junior Grand Prix Final (2019)	
Maxim Miroshkin	Russia	Lina Fedorova	(gold) Junior Grand Prix Final (2012)	
Maxim Miroshkin	Russia	Lina Fedorova	(silver) Winter Youth Olympics (2012); Junior Grand Prix Final (2014)	
Maxim Miroshkin	Russia	Lina Fedorova	(bronze) World Junior Championships (2013, 2015); Junior Grand Prix Final (2013)	
Vladislav Mirzoev	Russia	Anastasia Mishina	(gold) Junior Grand Prix Final (2016)	
Vladislav Mirzoev	Russia	Anastasia Mishina	(silver) World Junior Championships (2016)	
Anastasia Mishina	Russia	Aleksandr Galliamov; Vladislav Mirzoev	(gold) World Championships (2021); European Championships (2022); Russian Championships (2022, 2024–25); World Junior Championships (2019); Junior Grand Prix Final (2016, 2018)	
Anastasia Mishina	Russia	Aleksandr Galliamov; Vladislav Mirzoev	(silver) World Junior Championships (2016)	
Anastasia Mishina	Russia	Aleksandr Galliamov; Vladislav Mirzoev	(bronze) Winter Olympics (2022); Grand Prix Final (2019); World Junior Championships (2018)	
Natalia Mishkutionok	Soviet Union	Artur Dmitriev	(gold) World Championships (1991); European Championships (1991)	
Natalia Mishkutionok	Soviet Union	Artur Dmitriev	(bronze) World Championships (1990); European Championships (1989–90)	
Natalia Mishkutionok	CIS	Artur Dmitriev	(gold) Winter Olympics (1992); World Championships (1992); European Championships (1992)	
Natalia Mishkutionok	Russia	Artur Dmitriev	(silver) Winter Olympics (1994)	
Natalia Mishkutionok	Russia	Artur Dmitriev	(bronze) European Championships (1994)	
Misha Mitrofanov	United States	Alisa Efimova Audrey Lu	(gold) Four Continents Championships (2022); U.S. Championships (2025)	
Riku Miura	Japan	Ryuichi Kihara	(gold) World Championships (2023, 2025); Four Continents Championships (2023, 2025); Grand Prix Final (2022, 2025); Japan Championships (2020, 2025)	
Riku Miura	Japan	Ryuichi Kihara	(silver) Winter Olympics (2022); World Championships (2022, 2024); Four Continents Championships (2024); Grand Prix Final (2024)	
Cédric Monod	Switzerland	Leslie Monod	(gold) Swiss Championships (1992–94)	
Leslie Monod	Switzerland	Cédric Monod	(gold) Swiss Championships (1992–94)	
Kirsten Moore-Towers	Canada	Michael Marinaro; Dylan Moscovitch	(gold) Canadian Championships (2011, 2019–20, 2022)	
Kirsten Moore-Towers	Canada	Michael Marinaro; Dylan Moscovitch	(silver) Winter Olympics (2014); Four Continents Championships (2013, 2019)	
Kirsten Moore-Towers	Canada	Michael Marinaro; Dylan Moscovitch	(bronze) Four Continents Championships (2020)	
Anaïs Morand	Switzerland	Antoine Dorsaz; Timothy Leemann	(gold) Swiss Championships (2008–12)	
Stanislav Morozov	Ukraine	Aljona Savchenko; Tatiana Volosozhar	(gold) Ukrainian Championships (2000–01, 2005, 2007–08, 2010); World Junior Championships (2000); Junior Grand Prix Final (1999)	
Vladimir Morozov	Russia	Evgenia Tarasova	(gold) European Championships (2017–18); Grand Prix Final (2016); Russian Championships (2018–19, 2021)	
Vladimir Morozov	Russia	Evgenia Tarasova	(silver) Winter Olympics (2018, 2022); World Championships (2018–19); European Championships (2019–20, 2022); World Junior Championships (2014)	
Vladimir Morozov	Russia	Evgenia Tarasova	(bronze) World Championships (2017); European Championships (2015–16); Grand Prix Final (2018)	
Suzanne Morrow Francis	Canada	Wallace Diestelmeyer	(gold) Canadian Championships (1947–48)	
Suzanne Morrow Francis	Canada	Wallace Diestelmeyer	(bronze) Winter Olympics (1948); World Championships (1948)	
Dylan Moscovitch	Canada	Liubov Ilyushechkina; Kirsten Moore-Towers	(gold) Canadian Championships (2011)	
Dylan Moscovitch	Canada	Liubov Ilyushechkina; Kirsten Moore-Towers	(silver) Winter Olympics (2014); Four Continents Championships (2013)	
Dylan Moscovitch	Canada	Liubov Ilyushechkina; Kirsten Moore-Towers	(bronze) Four Continents Championships (2017)	
Tamara Moskvina	Soviet Union	Alexander Gavrilov; Alexei Mishin	(gold) Soviet Championships (1965, 1969)	
Tamara Moskvina	Soviet Union	Alexander Gavrilov; Alexei Mishin	(silver) World Championships (1969); European Championships (1968)	
Tamara Moskvina	Soviet Union	Alexander Gavrilov; Alexei Mishin	(bronze) European Championships (1969)	
Kendra Moyle	United States	Andy Seitz	(silver) World Junior Championships (2006)	
Sergei Muhhin	Estonia	Natalia Zabiiako	(gold) Estonian Championships (2010)	
Diana Mukhametzianova	Russia	Ilya Mironov	(silver) Winter Youth Olympics (2020); Junior Grand Prix Final (2019)	
Maria Mukhortova	Russia	Maxim Trankov	(gold) Russian Championships (2007); World Junior Championships (2005); Junior Grand Prix Final (2004)	
Maria Mukhortova	Russia	Maxim Trankov	(silver) European Championships (2008)	
Maria Mukhortova	Russia	Maxim Trankov	(bronze) European Championships (2009–10); World Junior Championships (2004); Junior Grand Prix Final (2003)	
Irene Müller	East Germany	Bodo Bockenauer Hans-Georg Dallmer	(gold) East German Championships (1958–59, 1965)	
Mirko Müller	Germany	Sarah Jentgens; Peggy Schwarz	(gold) German Championships (1998–2000, 2002)	
Mirko Müller	Germany	Sarah Jentgens; Peggy Schwarz	(bronze) World Championships (1998)	
Rodney Murdoch	Great Britain	Mollie Phillips	(bronze) European Championships (1933)	
Ekaterina Murugova	Soviet Union	Artem Torgashev	(silver) World Junior Championships (1987)	
Ekaterina Murugova	Soviet Union	Artem Torgashev	(bronze) World Junior Championships (1986)	

== N ==
Skater	Nation	Partner(s)	Major championships	Ref.
László Nagy	Hungary	Marianna Nagy	(gold) European Championships (1950, 1955); Hungarian Championships (1950–52, 1954–58)	
László Nagy	Hungary	Marianna Nagy	(silver) European Championships (1949, 1953, 1956–57)	
László Nagy	Hungary	Marianna Nagy	(bronze) Winter Olympics (1952, 1956); World Championships (1950, 1953, 1955); European Championships (1952)	
Marianna Nagy	Hungary	László Nagy	(gold) European Championships (1950, 1955); Hungarian Championships (1950–52, 1954–58)	
Marianna Nagy	Hungary	László Nagy	(silver) European Championships (1949, 1953, 1956–57)	
Marianna Nagy	Hungary	László Nagy	(bronze) Winter Olympics (1952, 1956); World Championships (1950, 1953, 1955); European Championships (1952)	
Vadim Naumov	Soviet Union	Evgenia Shishkova	(gold) Soviet Championships (1991)	
Vadim Naumov	Soviet Union	Evgenia Shishkova	(bronze) European Championships (1991)	
Vadim Naumov	CIS	Evgenia Shishkova	(bronze) European Championships (1992)	
Vadim Naumov	Russia	Evgenia Shishkova	(gold) World Championships (1994); Grand Prix Final (1995); Russian Championships (1993, 1996)	
Vadim Naumov	Russia	Evgenia Shishkova	(silver) World Championships (1995); European Championships (1994)	
Vadim Naumov	Russia	Evgenia Shishkova	(bronze) World Championships (1993); European Championships (1993, 1995)	
Ekaterina Nekrassova	Estonia	Valdis Mintals	(gold) Estonian Championships (1996–97)	
Dorothyann Nelson	United States	Pieter Kollen	(gold) U.S. Championships (1962)	
Sofiia Nesterova	Ukraine	Artem Darenskyi	(gold) Ukrainian Championships (2018–19)	
Jennifer Nicks	Great Britain	John Nicks	(gold) World Championships (1953); European Championships (1953); British Championships (1948–53)	
Jennifer Nicks	Great Britain	John Nicks	(silver) World Championships (1950); European Championships (1952)	
Jennifer Nicks	Great Britain	John Nicks	(bronze) World Championships (1951–52); European Championships (1950–51)	
John Nicks	Great Britain	Jennifer Nicks	(gold) World Championships (1953); European Championships (1953); British Championships (1948–53)	
John Nicks	Great Britain	Jennifer Nicks	(silver) World Championships (1950); European Championships (1952)	
John Nicks	Great Britain	Jennifer Nicks	(bronze) World Championships (1951–52); European Championships (1950–51)	
Svetlana Nikolaeva	Russia	Alexei Sokolov	(silver) World Junior Championships (1998)	
Nathaniel Niles	United States	Theresa Weld	(gold) U.S. Championships (1918, 1920–27)	
Franz Ningel	West Germany	Margret Göbl; Marika Kilius	(gold) German Championships (1955–57, 1960–62)	
Franz Ningel	West Germany	Margret Göbl; Marika Kilius	(silver) World Championships (1957); European Championships (1961)	
Franz Ningel	West Germany	Margret Göbl; Marika Kilius	(bronze) World Championships (1956, 1962); European Championships (1955–57, 1960, 1962)	
Günther Noack	Germany	Inge Koch; Gerda Strauch	(gold) German Championships (1942–43)	
Günther Noack	Germany	Inge Koch; Gerda Strauch	(bronze) World Championships (1938–39); European Championships (1938–39)	
René Novotný	Czechoslovakia	Jana Havlová; Lenka Knapová; Radka Kovaříková	(gold) Czechoslovak Championships (1983, 1985–90)	
René Novotný	Czechoslovakia	Jana Havlová; Lenka Knapová; Radka Kovaříková	(silver) World Championships (1992)	
René Novotný	Czech Republic	Jana Havlová; Lenka Knapová; Radka Kovaříková	(gold) World Championships (1995); Czech Championships (1994)	
René Novotný	Czech Republic	Jana Havlová; Lenka Knapová; Radka Kovaříková	(silver) European Championships (1995)	

== O ==
Skater	Nation	Partner(s)	Major championships	Ref.
Julia Obertas	Ukraine	Dmytro Palamarchuk	(gold) Ukrainian Championships (1999); World Junior Championships (1998–99); Junior Grand Prix Final (1997–98)	
Julia Obertas	Ukraine	Dmytro Palamarchuk	(silver) World Junior Championships (2000)	
Julia Obertas	Russia	Sergei Slavnov	(silver) European Championships (2005)	
Benjamin Okolski	United States	Brooke Castile	(gold) U.S. Championships (2007)	
Benjamin Okolski	United States	Brooke Castile	(bronze) Four Continents Championships (2008)	
Peter Oppegard	United States	Jill Watson	(gold) U.S. Championships (1985, 1987–88)	
Peter Oppegard	United States	Jill Watson	(bronze) Winter Olympics (1988); World Championships (1987)	
Kurt Oppelt	Austria	Sissy Schwarz	(gold) Winter Olympics (1956); World Championships (1956); European Championships (1956); Austrian Championships (1952–56)	
Kurt Oppelt	Austria	Sissy Schwarz	(silver) World Championships (1955); European Championships (1954)	
Kurt Oppelt	Austria	Sissy Schwarz	(bronze) World Championships (1954); European Championships (1953)	
Olga Orgonista	Hungary	Sándor Szalay	(gold) European Championships (1930–31); Hungarian Championships (1928–30)	
Olga Orgonista	Hungary	Sándor Szalay	(silver) World Championships (1931)	
Olga Orgonista	Hungary	Sándor Szalay	(bronze) World Championships (1929)	
Carole Ormaca	United States	Robin Greiner	(gold) U.S. Championships (1953–56)	
Katie Orscher	United States	Garrett Lucash	(gold) U.S. Championships (2005)	
Katie Orscher	United States	Garrett Lucash	(bronze) Four Continents Championships (2005)	
Daniel O'Shea	United States	Ellie Kam; Tarah Kayne	(gold) Four Continents Championships (2018); U.S. Championships (2016, 2024)	
Daniel O'Shea	United States	Ellie Kam; Tarah Kayne	(silver) Four Continents Championships (2014)	
Daniel O'Shea	United States	Ellie Kam; Tarah Kayne	(bronze) Four Continents Championships (2024)	
Rolf Österreich	East Germany	Romy Kermer	(gold) East German Championships (1973, 1975–76)	
Rolf Österreich	East Germany	Romy Kermer	(silver) Winter Olympics (1976); World Championships (1975–76); European Championships (1974–76)	
Rolf Österreich	East Germany	Romy Kermer	(bronze) World Championships (1974)	
Maribel Owen	United States	Dudley Richards	(gold) U.S. Championships (1961)	

== P ==
Skater	Nation	Partner(s)	Major championships	Ref.
Dmytro Palamarchuk	Ukraine	Tatiana Chuvaeva; Julia Obertas	(gold) Ukrainian Championships (1999, 2002–03); World Junior Championships (1998–99); Junior Grand Prix Final (1997–98)	
Dmytro Palamarchuk	Ukraine	Tatiana Chuvaeva; Julia Obertas	(silver) World Junior Championships (2000)	
Apollinariia Panfilova	Russia	Dmitry Rylov	(gold) Winter Youth Olympics (2020); World Junior Championships (2020); Junior Grand Prix Final (2019)	
Apollinariia Panfilova	Russia	Dmitry Rylov	(silver) World Junior Championships (2019); Junior Grand Prix Final (2017)	
Apollinariia Panfilova	Russia	Dmitry Rylov	(bronze) Junior Grand Prix Final (2018)	
Pang Qing	China	Tong Jian	(gold) World Championships (2006, 2010); Four Continents Championships (2002, 2004, 2008–09, 2011); Grand Prix Final (2008); Chinese Championships (2000, 2004, 2007)	
Pang Qing	China	Tong Jian	(silver) Winter Olympics (2010); World Championships (2007); Four Continents Championships (2003, 2005, 2007); Grand Prix Final (2009–10)	
Pang Qing	China	Tong Jian	(bronze) World Championships (2004, 2011, 2015); Four Continents Championships (2015); Grand Prix Final (2004, 2007, 2012–13)	
Idi Papez	Austria	Karl Zwack	(gold) European Championships (1933); Austrian Championships (1933–35)	
Idi Papez	Austria	Karl Zwack	(silver) World Championships (1933–34); European Championships (1934–35)	
Idi Papez	Austria	Karl Zwack	(bronze) World Championships (1931); European Championships (1932)	
Robert Paul	Canada	Barbara Wagner	(gold) Winter Olympics (1960); World Championships (1957–60); Canadian Championships (1956–60)	
Erik Pausin	Austria	Ilse Pausin	(gold) Austrian Championships (1936–41)	
Erik Pausin	Austria	Ilse Pausin	(silver) Winter Olympics (1936); World Championships (1935–39); European Championships (1937–39)	
Ilse Pausin	Austria	Erik Pausin	(gold) Austrian Championships (1936–41)	
Ilse Pausin	Austria	Erik Pausin	(silver) Winter Olympics (1936); World Championships (1935–39); European Championships (1937–39)	
Daria Pavliuchenko	Russia	Denis Khodykin	(gold) World Junior Championships (2018)	
Daria Pavliuchenko	Russia	Denis Khodykin	(bronze) European Championships (2020); Junior Grand Prix Final (2017)	
Maria Pavlova	Hungary	Alexei Sviatchenko	(gold) Hungarian Championships (2023–24)	
David Pelletier	Canada	Jamie Salé	(gold) Winter Olympics (2002); World Championships (2001); Four Continents Championships (2000–01); Grand Prix Final (2000–01); Canadian Championships (2000–02)	
Peng Cheng	China	Jin Yang; Wang Lei; Zhang Hao	(gold) Chinese Championships (2014, 2017, 2019–20 2024)	
Peng Cheng	China	Jin Yang; Wang Lei; Zhang Hao	(silver) Four Continents Championships (2015, 2020); Grand Prix Final (2018–19)	
Peng Cheng	China	Jin Yang; Wang Lei; Zhang Hao	(bronze) Four Continents Championships (2019)	
Veronica Pershina	Soviet Union	Marat Akbarov	(gold) Soviet Championships (1981); World Junior Championships (1979)	
Veronica Pershina	Soviet Union	Marat Akbarov	(bronze) European Championships (1985)	
Marina Pestova	Soviet Union	Stanislav Leonovich	(gold) Soviet Championships (1980, 1982–83)	
Marina Pestova	Soviet Union	Stanislav Leonovich	(silver) World Championships (1982); European Championships (1982)	
Marina Pestova	Soviet Union	Stanislav Leonovich	(bronze) World Championships (1980); European Championships (1980)	
Denis Petrov	Soviet Union	Elena Bechke	(gold) Soviet Championships (1992)	
Denis Petrov	Soviet Union	Elena Bechke	(silver) European Championships (1991)	
Denis Petrov	Soviet Union	Elena Bechke	(bronze) World Championships (1989)	
Denis Petrov	CIS	Elena Bechke	(silver) Winter Olympics (1992); European Championships (1992)	
Maria Petrova	Russia	Teimuraz Pulin; Anton Sikharulidze; Alexei Tikhonov	(gold) World Championships (2000); European Championships (1999–2000); Russian Championships (2006); World Junior Championships (1994–95)	
Maria Petrova	Russia	Teimuraz Pulin; Anton Sikharulidze; Alexei Tikhonov	(silver) World Championships (2005); European Championships (2004, 2007); Grand Prix Final (2004); World Junior Championships (1993, 1997)	
Maria Petrova	Russia	Teimuraz Pulin; Anton Sikharulidze; Alexei Tikhonov	(bronze) World Championships (2003, 2006); European Championships (2002–03, 2005–06); Grand Prix Final (1998, 2002–03)	
Grigori Petrovski	Russia	Viktoria Shliakhova	(bronze) Junior Grand Prix Final (1999)	
Willy Petter	Austria	Lilly Scholz	(gold) Austrian Championships (1931–32)	
Willy Petter	Austria	Lilly Scholz	(silver) European Championships (1932–33)	
Willy Petter	Austria	Lilly Scholz	(bronze) European Championships (1931)	
Jessica Pfund	Switzerland	Joshua Santillan	(gold) Swiss Championships (2022)	
Mollie Phillips	Great Britain	Rodney Murdoch	(bronze) European Championships (1933)	
Dominika Piątkowska	Poland	Dmitri Khromin	(gold) Polish Championships (2005–07)	
Marylin Pla	France	Yannick Bonheur	(gold) French Championships (2005–07)	
Natalia Ponomareva	Uzbekistan	Evgeni Sviridov	(gold) Uzbekistani Championships (1998–2003)	
Daria Popova	France	Bruno Massot	(gold) French Championships (2012)	
Otto Preißecker	Austria	Gisela Hochhaltinger	(bronze) European Championships (1930)	
Olga Prokuronova	Czech Republic	Karel Štefl	(gold) Czech Championships (2006)	
Annabelle Prölß	Germany	Ruben Blommaert	(gold) German Championships (2013)	
Georgi Proskurin	Soviet Union	Galina Karelina	(bronze) European Championships (1971)	
Oleg Protopopov	Soviet Union	Ludmila Belousova	(gold) Winter Olympics (1964, 1968); World Championships (1965–68); European Championships (1965–68); Soviet Championships (1962–64, 1966–68)	
Oleg Protopopov	Soviet Union	Ludmila Belousova	(silver) World Championships (1962–64); European Championships (1962–64, 1969)	
Oleg Protopopov	Soviet Union	Ludmila Belousova	(bronze) World Championships (1969)	
Svitlana Prystav	Soviet Union	Viacheslav Tkachenko	(silver) World Junior Championships (1990–91)	
Svitlana Prystav	Soviet Union	Viacheslav Tkachenko	(bronze) World Junior Championships (1992)	
Svitlana Prystav	Ukraine	Viacheslav Tkachenko	(gold) Ukrainian Championships (1993)	
Margaret Purdy	Canada	Michael Marinaro	(silver) World Junior Championships (2013)	
Elizabeth Putnam	Canada	Sean Wirtz	(bronze) Four Continents Championships (2006)	

== R ==
Skater	Nation	Partner(s)	Major championships	Ref.
Eric Radford	Canada	Meagan Duhamel; Vanessa James	(gold) Winter Olympics (2018); World Championships (2015–16); Four Continents Championships (2013, 2015); Grand Prix Final (2014); Canadian Championships (2012–18)	
Eric Radford	Canada	Meagan Duhamel; Vanessa James	(silver) Winter Olympics (2014); Four Continents Championships (2011, 2017); Grand Prix Final (2015)	
Eric Radford	Canada	Meagan Duhamel; Vanessa James	(bronze) Winter Olympics (2018); World Championships (2013–14, 2022); Grand Prix Final (2016–17)	
Emil Ratzenhofer	Austria	Herta Ratzenhofer	(gold) Austrian Championships (1943, 1946–49)	
Emil Ratzenhofer	Austria	Herta Ratzenhofer	(bronze) European Championships (1948–49)	
Herta Ratzenhofer	Austria	Emil Ratzenhofer	(gold) Austrian Championships (1943, 1946–49)	
Herta Ratzenhofer	Austria	Emil Ratzenhofer	(bronze) European Championships (1948–49)	
Axel Rauschenbach	East Germany	Anuschka Gläser; Mandy Wötzel	(gold) East German Championships (1989–90)	
Axel Rauschenbach	East Germany	Anuschka Gläser; Mandy Wötzel	(silver) European Championships (1989)	
Axel Rauschenbach	Germany	Anuschka Gläser; Mandy Wötzel	(gold) German Championships (1991, 1994)	
Claudia Rauschenbach	Germany	Robin Szolkowy	(gold) German Championships (2001)	
Ren Zhongfei	China	Ding Yang	(gold) Chinese Championships (2005); Junior Grand Prix Final (2002)	
Ren Zhongfei	China	Ding Yang	(silver) World Junior Championships (2003)	
Ren Zhongfei	China	Ding Yang	(bronze) World Junior Championships (2002); Junior Grand Prix Final (2001)	
Diana Rennik	Estonia	Aleksei Saks	(gold) Estonian Championships (2003–06)	
Guy Revell	Canada	Debbi Wilkes	(gold) Canadian Championships (1963–64)	
Guy Revell	Canada	Debbi Wilkes	(silver) Winter Olympics (1964)	
Guy Revell	Canada	Debbi Wilkes	(bronze) World Championships (1964)	
Rico Rex	Germany	Eva-Maria Fitze	(gold) German Championships (2003)	
Elena Riabchuk	Russia	Stanislav Zakharov	(gold) World Junior Championships (2002)	
Dudley Richards	United States	Maribel Owen	(gold) U.S. Championships (1961)	
Danielle Rieder	Switzerland	Paul Huber	(gold) Swiss Championships (1980)	
Christina Riegel	West Germany	Andreas Nischwitz	(gold) German Championships (1979–81)	
Christina Riegel	West Germany	Andreas Nischwitz	(silver) European Championships (1981)	
Christina Riegel	West Germany	Andreas Nischwitz	(bronze) World Championships (1981)	
Inga Rodionova	Azerbaijan	Andrei Krukov	(gold) Azerbaijani Championships (2000)	
Irina Rodnina	Soviet Union	Alexei Ulanov; Alexander Zaitsev	(gold) Winter Olympics (1972, 1976, 1980); World Championships (1969–78); European Championships (1969–78, 1980); Soviet Championships (1970–71, 1973–75, 1977)	
Alexei Rogonov	Russia	Anastasia Martiusheva	(silver) World Junior Championships (2009)	
Kristen Roth	United States	Michael McPherson	(silver) Junior Grand Prix Final (2000)	
Kristen Roth	United States	Michael McPherson	(bronze) World Junior Championships (2001)	
Emília Rotter	Hungary	László Szollás	(gold) World Championships (1931, 1933–35); European Championships (1934); Hungarian Championships (1931–36)	
Emília Rotter	Hungary	László Szollás	(silver) World Championships (1932); European Championships (1930–31)	
Emília Rotter	Hungary	László Szollás	(bronze) Winter Olympics (1932, 1936)	
Nicolas Roulet	Switzerland	Alexandra Herbríková	(gold) Swiss Championships (2015–16, 2019–20)	
Dmitry Rylov	Russia	Apollinariia Panfilova	(gold) Winter Youth Olympics (2020); World Junior Championships (2020); Junior Grand Prix Final (2019)	
Dmitry Rylov	Russia	Apollinariia Panfilova	(silver) World Junior Championships (2019); Junior Grand Prix Final (2017)	
Dmitry Rylov	Russia	Apollinariia Panfilova	(bronze) Junior Grand Prix Final (2018)	
Ryom Tae-ok	North Korea	Kim Ju-sik; O Chang-gon	(gold) North Korean Championships (2013, 2017–21)	
Ryom Tae-ok	North Korea	Kim Ju-sik; O Chang-gon	(bronze) Four Continents Championships (2018)	

== S ==
Skater	Nation	Partner(s)	Major championships	Ref.
Karina Safina	Georgia	Luka Berulava	(gold) World Junior Championships (2022)	
Aleksei Saks	Estonia	Diana Rennik	(gold) Estonian Championships (2003–06)	
Jamie Salé	Canada	David Pelletier	(gold) Winter Olympics (2002); World Championships (2001); Four Continents Championships (2000–01); Grand Prix Final (2000–01); Canadian Championships (2000–02)	
Todd Sand	United States	Natasha Kuchiki; Jenni Meno	(gold) U.S. Championships (1991, 1994–96)	
Todd Sand	United States	Natasha Kuchiki; Jenni Meno	(silver) World Championships (1998)	
Todd Sand	United States	Natasha Kuchiki; Jenni Meno	(bronze) World Championships (1991, 1995–96)	
Joshua Santillan	Switzerland	Jessica Pfund	(gold) Swiss Championships (2022)	
Kristy Sargeant	Canada	Kris Wirtz	(gold) Canadian Championships (1998–99)	
Kristy Sargeant	Canada	Kris Wirtz	(silver) Four Continents Championships (1999)	
Aljona Savchenko	Ukraine	Stanislav Morozov	(gold) Ukrainian Championships (2000–01); World Junior Championships (2000); Junior Grand Prix Final (1999)	
Aljona Savchenko	Germany	Bruno Massot; Robin Szolkowy	(gold) Winter Olympics (2018); World Championships (2008–09, 2011–12, 2014, 2018); European Championships (2007–09, 2011); Grand Prix Final (2007, 2010–11, 2013, 2017); German Championships (2004–09, 2011, 2014, 2016, 2018)	
Aljona Savchenko	Germany	Bruno Massot; Robin Szolkowy	(silver) World Championships (2010, 2013, 2017); European Championships (2006, 2010, 2013, 2016–17); Grand Prix Final (2006)	
Aljona Savchenko	Germany	Bruno Massot; Robin Szolkowy	(bronze) Winter Olympics (2010, 2014); World Championships (2007, 2016); Grand Prix Final (2005, 2008–09)	
Dmitry Saveliev	Russia	Inga Korshunova	(gold) World Junior Championships (1993)	
Sophia Schaller	Austria	Livio Mayr	(gold) Austrian Championships (2023–25)	
Noah Scherer	Switzerland	Ioulia Chtchetinina; Méline Habechian	(gold) Swiss Championships (2014, 2017)	
Lilly Scholz	Austria	Otto Kaiser; Willy Petter	(gold) World Championships (1929); Austrian Championships (1924, 1927–29, 1931–32)	
Lilly Scholz	Austria	Otto Kaiser; Willy Petter	(silver) Winter Olympics (1928); World Championships (1926–28); European Championships (1932–33)	
Lilly Scholz	Austria	Otto Kaiser; Willy Petter	(bronze) World Championships (1925); European Championships (1931)	
Tobias Schröter	East Germany	Katrin Kanitz	(gold) East German Championships (1986–87)	
Tobias Schröter	East Germany	Katrin Kanitz	(bronze) European Championships (1987)	
Doris Schubach	United States	Walter Noffke	(gold) U.S. Championships (1942–44)	
Knut Schubert	East Germany	Birgit Lorenz	(gold) East German Championships (1981, 1985)	
Knut Schubert	East Germany	Birgit Lorenz	(bronze) European Championships (1983–84)	
Peggy Schwarz	East Germany	Alexander König	(gold) East German Championships (1988)	
Sissy Schwarz	Austria	Kurt Oppelt	(gold) Winter Olympics (1956); World Championships (1956); European Championships (1956); Austrian Championships (1952–56)	
Sissy Schwarz	Austria	Kurt Oppelt	(silver) World Championships (1955); European Championships (1954)	
Sissy Schwarz	Austria	Kurt Oppelt	(bronze) World Championships (1954); European Championships (1953)	
Peggy Schwarz	East Germany	Alexander König; Mirko Müller	(gold) East German Championships (1988)	
Peggy Schwarz	East Germany	Alexander König; Mirko Müller	(bronze) European Championships (1988)	
Peggy Schwarz	Germany	Alexander König; Mirko Müller	(gold) German Championships (1992, 1998–2000)	
Peggy Schwarz	Germany	Alexander König; Mirko Müller	(bronze) World Championships (1998)	
Tiffany Scott	United States	Philip Dulebohn	(gold) U.S. Championships (2003)	
Tiffany Scott	United States	Philip Dulebohn	(bronze) Four Continents Championships (2000)	
Andrew Seabrook	Great Britain	Marsha Poluliaschenko; Tiffany Sfikas	(gold) British Championships (1998–99, 2001–02)	
Julianne Séguin	Canada	Charlie Bilodeau	(gold) Junior Grand Prix Final (2014)	
Julianne Séguin	Canada	Charlie Bilodeau	(silver) World Junior Championships (2015)	
Andy Seitz	United States	Kendra Moyle	(silver) World Junior Championships (2006)	
Larisa Selezneva	Soviet Union	Oleg Makarov	(gold) European Championships (1987, 1989); Soviet Championships (1984–85, 1988–90); World Junior Championships (1980–81)	
Larisa Selezneva	Soviet Union	Oleg Makarov	(silver) World Championships (1985); European Championships (1985, 1988, 1990); World Junior Championships (1979)	
Larisa Selezneva	Soviet Union	Oleg Makarov	(bronze) Winter Olympics (1984); World Championships (1988)	
Margit Senf	East Germany	Peter Göbel	(gold) East German Championships (1960–61, 1963)	
Margit Senf	East Germany	Peter Göbel	(bronze) European Championships (1961)	
Maria Sergejeva	Estonia	Ilja Glebov	(gold) Estonian Championships (2007–09)	
Jutta Seyfert	East Germany	Irene Salzmann	(gold) East German Championships (1949)	
Tiffany Sfikas	Great Britain	Andrew Seabrook	(gold) British Championships (2001–02)	
Sergei Shakhrai	Soviet Union	Marina Cherkasova	(gold) World Championships (1980); European Championships (1979); Soviet Championships (1978–79)	
Sergei Shakhrai	Soviet Union	Marina Cherkasova	(silver) Winter Olympics (1980); World Championships (1979); European Championships (1978, 1980)	
Sergei Shakhrai	Soviet Union	Marina Cherkasova	(bronze) European Championships (1977, 1981)	
Julia Shapiro	Russia	Alexei Sokolov	(silver) Junior Grand Prix Final (1999)	
Julia Shapiro	Russia	Alexei Sokolov	(bronze) World Junior Championships (2000)	
Julia Shapiro	Israel	Vadim Akolzin	(gold) Israeli Championships (2003–05)	
Kenneth Shelley	United States	JoJo Starbuck	(gold) U.S. Championships (1970–72)	
Kenneth Shelley	United States	JoJo Starbuck	(bronze) World Championships (1971–72)	
Shen Xue	China	Zhao Hongbo	(gold) Winter Olympics (2010); World Championships (2002–03, 2007); Four Continents Championships (1999, 2003, 2007); Grand Prix Final (1998–99, 2003–04, 2006, 2009); Chinese Championships (1993–94, 1996–99, 2001–02)	
Shen Xue	China	Zhao Hongbo	(silver) World Championships (1999–2000, 2004); Four Continents Championships (2001); Grand Prix Final (2002)	
Shen Xue	China	Zhao Hongbo	(bronze) Winter Olympics (2002, 2006); World Championships (2001); Grand Prix Final (2000–01)	
Ekaterina Sheremetieva	Russia	Mikhail Kuznetsov	(silver) Junior Grand Prix Final (2007)	
Yvonne Sherman	United States	Robert Swenning	(gold) U.S. Championships (1947)	
Natalia Shestakova	Russia	Pavel Lebedev	(gold) World Junior Championships (2004)	
Natalia Shestakova	Russia	Pavel Lebedev	(silver) Junior Grand Prix Final (2003)	
Evgenia Shishkova	Soviet Union	Vadim Naumov	(gold) Soviet Championships (1991)	
Evgenia Shishkova	Soviet Union	Vadim Naumov	(bronze) European Championships (1991)	
Evgenia Shishkova	CIS	Vadim Naumov	(bronze) European Championships (1992)	
Evgenia Shishkova	Russia	Vadim Naumov	(gold) World Championships (1994); Grand Prix Final (1995); Russian Championships (1993, 1996)	
Evgenia Shishkova	Russia	Vadim Naumov	(silver) World Championships (1995); European Championships (1994)	
Evgenia Shishkova	Russia	Vadim Naumov	(bronze) World Championships (1993); European Championships (1993, 1995)	
Dmitri Shkidchenko	Soviet Union	Irina Mironenko	(silver) World Junior Championships (1985–86)	
Viktoria Shklover	Estonia	Valdis Mintals	(gold) Estonian Championships (1999–2002)	
Viktoria Shliakhova	Russia	Grigori Petrovski	(bronze) Junior Grand Prix Final (1999)	
Simon Shnapir	United States	Marissa Castelli	(gold) U.S. Championships (2013–14)	
Simon Shnapir	United States	Marissa Castelli	(bronze) Winter Olympics (2014); Four Continents Championships (2013); World Junior Championships (2009)	
Anton Sikharulidze	Russia	Elena Berezhnaya; Maria Petrova	(gold) Winter Olympics (2002); World Championships (1998–99); European Championships (1998, 2001); Grand Prix Final (1997); Russian Championships (1999–2002); World Junior Championships (1994–95)	
Anton Sikharulidze	Russia	Elena Berezhnaya; Maria Petrova	(silver) Winter Olympics (1998); World Championships (2001); Grand Prix Final (1998, 2000–01); World Junior Championships (1993)	
Anton Sikharulidze	Russia	Elena Berezhnaya; Maria Petrova	(bronze) European Championships (1997); Grand Prix Final (1999)	
Dennis Silverthorne	Great Britain	Winifred Silverthorne	(silver) European Championships (1947)	
Winifred Silverthorne	Great Britain	Dennis Silverthorne	(silver) European Championships (1947)	
Valeria Simakova	Russia	Anton Tokarev	(gold) Junior Grand Prix Final (2005)	
Britney Simpson	United States	Matthew Blackmer	(bronze) Junior Grand Prix Final (2011)	
Dorota Siudek	Poland	Mariusz Siudek	(gold) Polish Championships (1995–2000, 2002–04)	
Dorota Siudek	Poland	Mariusz Siudek	(silver) European Championships (1999–2000)	
Dorota Siudek	Poland	Mariusz Siudek	(bronze) World Championships (1999); European Championships (2004, 2007)	
Mariusz Siudek	Poland	Dorota Siudek	(gold) Polish Championships (1995–2000, 2002–04)	
Mariusz Siudek	Poland	Dorota Siudek	(silver) European Championships (1999–2000)	
Mariusz Siudek	Poland	Dorota Siudek	(bronze) World Championships (1999); European Championships (2004, 2007)	
Sergei Slavnov	Russia	Julia Karbovskaya; Julia Obertas	(silver) European Championships (2005); World Junior Championships (2002); Junior Grand Prix Final (2001)	
Alexander Smirnov	Russia	Yuko Kavaguti	(gold) European Championships (2010, 2015); Russian Championships (2008–10)	
Alexander Smirnov	Russia	Yuko Kavaguti	(silver) European Championships (2009, 2011)	
Alexander Smirnov	Russia	Yuko Kavaguti	(bronze) World Championships (2009–10); European Championships (2008); Grand Prix Final (2011, 2015)	
Lyudmila Smirnova	Soviet Union	Andrei Suraikin; Alexei Ulanov	(silver) Winter Olympics (1972); World Championships (1970–74); European Championships (1970–73)	
Lyudmila Smirnova	Soviet Union	Andrei Suraikin; Alexei Ulanov	(bronze) European Championships (1974)	
Alexei Sokolov	Russia	Svetlana Nikolaeva; Julia Shapiro	(silver) World Junior Championships (1998); Junior Grand Prix Final (1999)	
Alexei Sokolov	Russia	Svetlana Nikolaeva; Julia Shapiro	(bronze) World Junior Championships (2000)	
Fedor Sokolov	Israel	Ekaterina Sokolova	(gold) Israeli Championships (2008–09)	
Ekaterina Sokolova	Israel	Fedor Sokolov	(gold) Israeli Championships (2008–09)	
Dmitry Sopot	Russia	Ekaterina Borisova	(gold) Winter Youth Olympics (2016); Junior Grand Prix Final (2015)	
Dmitry Sopot	Russia	Ekaterina Borisova	(bronze) World Junior Championships (2016)	
Rumyana Spasova	Bulgaria	Stanimir Todorov	(gold) Bulgarian Championships (2004–06)	
Ilia Spiridonov	Russia	Amina Atakhanova	(bronze) Junior Grand Prix Final (2015)	
JoJo Starbuck	United States	Kenneth Shelley	(gold) U.S. Championships (1970–72)	
JoJo Starbuck	United States	Kenneth Shelley	(bronze) World Championships (1971–72)	
Eliane Steinemann	Switzerland	André Calame	(gold) Swiss Championships (1949–51)	
Eliane Steinemann	Switzerland	André Calame	(silver) European Championships (1950–51)	
Heidemarie Steiner	East Germany	Heinz-Ulrich Walther	(gold) East German Championships (1966–67, 1969–70)	
Heidemarie Steiner	East Germany	Heinz-Ulrich Walther	(bronze) World Championships (1970); European Championships (1967–68, 1970)	
Karel Štefl	Czech Republic	Olga Prokuronova	(gold) Czech Championships (2006)	
Deanna Stellato-Dudek	Canada	Maxime Deschamps	(gold) World Championships (2024); Four Continents Championships (2024); Canadian Championships (2023–25)	
Deanna Stellato-Dudek	Canada	Maxime Deschamps	(silver) World Championships (2025)	
Deanna Stellato-Dudek	Canada	Maxime Deschamps	(bronze) Four Continents Championships (2023); Grand Prix Final (2023)	
Ingo Steuer	East Germany	Manuela Landgraf	(gold) World Junior Championships (1984)	
Ingo Steuer	Germany	Mandy Wötzel	(gold) World Championships (1997); European Championships (1995); Grand Prix Final (1996); German Championships (1993, 1995–97)	
Ingo Steuer	Germany	Mandy Wötzel	(silver) World Championships (1993, 1996); European Championships (1993, 1996–97); Grand Prix Final (1997)	
Ingo Steuer	Germany	Mandy Wötzel	(bronze) Winter Olympics (1998); Grand Prix Final (1995)	
Ksenia Stolbova	Russia	Fedor Klimov	(gold) Winter Olympics (2014); Grand Prix Final (2015)	
Ksenia Stolbova	Russia	Fedor Klimov	(silver) Winter Olympics (2014); World Championships (2014); European Championships (2014–15, 2018); Grand Prix Final (2014); Russian Championships (2014–15, 2017); World Junior Championships (2011); Junior Grand Prix Final (2010)	
Ksenia Stolbova	Russia	Fedor Klimov	(bronze) European Championships (2012); World Junior Championships (2010)	
Věra Suchánková	Czechoslovakia	Zdeněk Doležal	(gold) European Championships (1957–58); Czechoslovak Championships (1956–58)	
Věra Suchánková	Czechoslovakia	Zdeněk Doležal	(silver) World Championships (1958); European Championships (1955)	
Sui Wenjing	China	Han Cong	(gold) Winter Olympics (2022); World Championships (2017, 2019); Four Continents Championships (2012, 2014, 2016–17, 2019–20); Grand Prix Final (2019); Chinese Championships (2010–11); World Junior Championships (2010–12); Junior Grand Prix Final (2009, 2011)	
Sui Wenjing	China	Han Cong	(silver) Winter Olympics (2018); World Championships (2015–16, 2021); Grand Prix Final (2017)	
Sui Wenjing	China	Han Cong	(bronze) Grand Prix Final (2010, 2014)	
Dmitri Sukhanov	Soviet Union	Evgenia Chernyshyova	(gold) World Junior Championships (1989)	
Dmitri Sukhanov	Soviet Union	Evgenia Chernyshyova	(silver) World Junior Championships (1988)	
Joanna Sulej	Poland	Mateusz Chruściński	(gold) Polish Championships (2009–10)	
Darryll Sulindro-Yang	Chinese Taipei	Amanda Sunyoto-Yang	(gold) Chinese Taipei Championships (2008–10)	
Amanda Sunyoto-Yang	Chinese Taipei	Darryll Sulindro-Yang	(gold) Chinese Taipei Championships (2008–10)	
Andrei Suraikin	Soviet Union	Lyudmila Smirnova	(silver) Winter Olympics (1972); World Championships (1970–72); European Championships (1970–72)	
Miu Suzaki	Japan	Ryuichi Kihara	(gold) Japan Championships (2018–19)	
Alexei Sviatchenko	Hungary	Maria Pavlova	(gold) Hungarian Championships (2023–24)	
Evgeni Sviridov	Uzbekistan	Natalia Ponomareva	(gold) Uzbekistani Championships (1998–2003)	
Robert Swenning	United States	Yvonne Sherman	(gold) U.S. Championships (1947)	
Rudi Swiegers	Canada	Paige Lawrence	(bronze) Four Continents Championships (2011)	
Edgar Syers	Great Britain	Madge Syers	(bronze) Summer Olympics (1908)	
Madge Syers	Great Britain	Edgar Syers	(bronze) Summer Olympics (1908)	
Herma Szabo	Austria	Ludwig Wrede	(gold) World Championships (1925, 1927); Austrian Championships (1925–26)	
Herma Szabo	Austria	Ludwig Wrede	(bronze) World Championships (1926)	
Sándor Szalay	Hungary	Olga Orgonista	(gold) European Championships (1930–31); Hungarian Championships (1928–30)	
Sándor Szalay	Hungary	Olga Orgonista	(silver) World Championships (1931)	
Sándor Szalay	Hungary	Olga Orgonista	(bronze) World Championships (1929)	
Attila Szekrényessy	Hungary	Piroska Szekrényessy	(gold) Hungarian Championships (1937–39; 1941–43)	
Attila Szekrényessy	Hungary	Piroska Szekrényessy	(bronze) European Championships (1936–37)	
Piroska Szekrényessy	Hungary	Attila Szekrényessy	(gold) Hungarian Championships (1937–39; 1941–43)	
Piroska Szekrényessy	Hungary	Attila Szekrényessy	(bronze) European Championships (1936–37)	
Robin Szolkowy	Germany	Claudia Rauschenbach; Aljona Savchenko	(gold) World Championships (2008–09, 2011–12, 2014); European Championships (2007–09, 2011); Grand Prix Final (2007, 2010–11, 2013); German Championships (2001, 2004–09, 2011, 2014)	
Robin Szolkowy	Germany	Claudia Rauschenbach; Aljona Savchenko	(silver) World Championships (2010, 2013); European Championships (2006, 2010, 2013); Grand Prix Final (2006);	
Robin Szolkowy	Germany	Claudia Rauschenbach; Aljona Savchenko	(bronze) Winter Olympics (2010, 2014); World Championships (2007); Grand Prix Final (2005, 2008–09)	
László Szollás	Hungary	Emília Rotter	(gold) World Championships (1931, 1933–35); European Championships (1934); Hungarian Championships (1931–36)	
László Szollás	Hungary	Emília Rotter	(silver) World Championships (1932); European Championships (1930–31)	
László Szollás	Hungary	Emília Rotter	(bronze) Winter Olympics (1932, 1936)	

== T ==
Skater	Nation	Partner(s)	Major championships	Ref.
Narumi Takahashi	Japan	Ryuichi Kihara; Mervin Tran	(gold) Japan Championships (2009–12, 2014–15); Junior Grand Prix Final (2010)	
Narumi Takahashi	Japan	Ryuichi Kihara; Mervin Tran	(silver) World Junior Championships (2010); Junior Grand Prix Final (2009)	
Narumi Takahashi	Japan	Ryuichi Kihara; Mervin Tran	(bronze) World Championships (2012); World Junior Championships (2011)	
Roman Talan	Ukraine	Kateryna Kostenko	(gold) Ukrainian Championships (2009)	
Adel Tankova	Israel	Evgeni Krasnopolski; Ronald Zilberberg	(gold) Israeli Championships (2015–16, 2018)	
Evgenia Tarasova	Russia	Vladimir Morozov	(gold) European Championships (2017–18); Grand Prix Final (2016); Russian Championships (2018–19, 2021)	
Evgenia Tarasova	Russia	Vladimir Morozov	(silver) Winter Olympics (2018, 2022); World Championships (2018–19); European Championships (2019–20, 2022); World Junior Championships (2014)	
Evgenia Tarasova	Russia	Vladimir Morozov	(bronze) World Championships (2017); European Championships (2015–16); Grand Prix Final (2018)	
Tassilo Thierbach	East Germany	Sabine Baeß	(gold) World Championships (1982); European Championships (1982–83); East German Championships (1979–80, 1982–84)	
Tassilo Thierbach	East Germany	Sabine Baeß	(silver) World Championships (1981, 1983); European Championships (1984)	
Tassilo Thierbach	East Germany	Sabine Baeß	(bronze) World Championships (1979, 1984); European Championships (1979)	
Alexei Tikhonov	Soviet Union	Irina Saifutdinova	(bronze) World Junior Championships (1989)	
Alexei Tikhonov	Japan	Yukiko Kawasaki	(gold) Japan Championships (1993–94)	
Alexei Tikhonov	Russia	Maria Petrova	(gold) World Championships (2000); European Championships (1999–2000); Russian Championships (2006)	
Alexei Tikhonov	Russia	Maria Petrova	(silver) World Championships (2005); European Championships (2004, 2007); Grand Prix Final (2004); World Junior Championships (1997)	
Alexei Tikhonov	Russia	Maria Petrova	(bronze) World Championships (2003, 2006); European Championships (2002–03, 2005–06); Grand Prix Final (1998, 2002–03)	
Daniel Tioumentsev	United States	Sophia Baram	(gold) World Junior Championships (2023)	
Daniel Tioumentsev	United States	Sophia Baram	(silver) Junior Grand Prix Final (2022)	
Viacheslav Tkachenko	Soviet Union	Svitlana Prystav	(silver) World Junior Championships (1990–91)	
Viacheslav Tkachenko	Soviet Union	Svitlana Prystav	(bronze) World Junior Championships (1992)	
Viacheslav Tkachenko	Ukraine	Svitlana Prystav	(gold) Ukrainian Championships (1993)	
Stanimir Todorov	Bulgaria	Rumyana Spasova	(gold) Bulgarian Championships (2004–06)	
Anton Tokarev	Russia	Valeria Simakova	(gold) Junior Grand Prix Final (2005)	
Tong Jian	China	Pang Qing	(gold) World Championships (2006, 2010); Four Continents Championships (2002, 2004, 2008–09, 2011); Grand Prix Final (2008); Chinese Championships (2000, 2004, 2007)	
Tong Jian	China	Pang Qing	(silver) Winter Olympics (2010); World Championships (2007); Four Continents Championships (2003, 2005, 2007); Grand Prix Final (2009–10)	
Tong Jian	China	Pang Qing	(bronze) World Championships (2004, 2011, 2015); Four Continents Championships (2015); Grand Prix Final (2004, 2007, 2012–13)	
Alexei Torchinski	Soviet Union	Natalia Krestianinova	(gold) World Junior Championships (1990–92)	
Artem Torgashev	Soviet Union	Ekaterina Murugova	(silver) World Junior Championships (1987)	
Artem Torgashev	Soviet Union	Ekaterina Murugova	(bronze) World Junior Championships (1986)	
Tatiana Totmianina	Russia	Maxim Marinin	(gold) Winter Olympics (2006); World Championships (2004–05); European Championships (2002–06); Grand Prix Final (2002, 2005); Russian Championships (2003–05)	
Tatiana Totmianina	Russia	Maxim Marinin	(silver) World Championships (2002–03); European Championships (2001); Grand Prix Final (2003)	
Joan Tozzer	United States	Bernard Fox	(gold) U.S. Championships (1938–40)	
Mervin Tran	Japan	Narumi Takahashi	(gold) Japan Championships (2009–12); Junior Grand Prix Final (2010)	
Mervin Tran	Japan	Narumi Takahashi	(silver) World Junior Championships (2010); Junior Grand Prix Final (2009)	
Mervin Tran	Japan	Narumi Takahashi	(bronze) World Championships (2012); World Junior Championships (2011)	
Maxim Trankov	Russia	Maria Mukhortova; Tatiana Volosozhar	(gold) Winter Olympics (2014); World Championships (2013); European Championships (2012–14, 2016); Grand Prix Final (2012); Russian Championships (2007, 2011, 2013, 2016); World Junior Championships (2005); Junior Grand Prix Final (2004)	
Maxim Trankov	Russia	Maria Mukhortova; Tatiana Volosozhar	(silver) World Championships (2011–12); European Championships (2008); Grand Prix Final (2012, 2014)	
Maxim Trankov	Russia	Maria Mukhortova; Tatiana Volosozhar	(bronze) European Championships (2009–10); World Junior Championships (2004); Junior Grand Prix Final (2003)	
Michel Tsiba	Netherlands	Daria Danilova	(gold) Dutch Championships (2020, 2022, 2025)	

== U ==
Skater	Nation	Partner(s)	Major championships	Ref.
Alexei Ulanov	Soviet Union	Irina Rodnina; Lyudmila Smirnova	(gold) Winter Olympics (1972); World Championships (1969–72); European Championships (1969–72); Soviet Championships (1970–71)	
Alexei Ulanov	Soviet Union	Irina Rodnina; Lyudmila Smirnova	(silver) World Championships (1973–74); European Championships (1973)	
Alexei Ulanov	Soviet Union	Irina Rodnina; Lyudmila Smirnova	(bronze) European Championships (1974)	
Barbara Underhill	Canada	Paul Martini	(gold) World Championships (1984); Canadian Championships (1979–83); World Junior Championships (1978)	
Barbara Underhill	Canada	Paul Martini	(bronze) World Championships (1983)	
Luny Unold	Switzerland	Hans Kuster	(gold) Swiss Championships (1946–48)	
Inna Utkina	Soviet Union	Serguei Likhanski	(silver) World Junior Championships (1982)	
Inna Utkina	Soviet Union	Serguei Likhanski	(bronze) World Junior Championships (1983)	
Calla Urbanski	United States	Rocky Marval	(gold) U.S. Championships (1992–93)	
Alina Ustimkina	Russia	Nikita Volodin	(bronze) Winter Youth Olympics (2016)	

== V ==
Skater	Nation	Partner(s)	Major championships	Ref.
Milania Väänänen	Finland	Mikhail Akulov; Filippo Clerici	(gold) Finnish Championships (2022–25)	
Anastasia Vaipan-Law	Great Britain	Luke Digby	(gold) British Championships (2022–26)	
Elena Valova	Soviet Union	Oleg Vasiliev	(gold) Winter Olympics (1984); World Championships (1983, 1985, 1988); European Championships (1984–86); Soviet Championships (1986)	
Elena Valova	Soviet Union	Oleg Vasiliev	(silver) Winter Olympics (1988); World Championships (1984, 1986–87); European Championships (1983, 1987)	
Aaron Van Cleave	Germany	Mari Vartmann	(gold) German Championships (2015)	
Mari Vartmann	Germany	Ruben Blommaert; Aaron Van Cleave	(gold) German Championships (2015, 2017)	
Oleg Vasiliev	Soviet Union	Elena Valova	(gold) Winter Olympics (1984); World Championships (1983, 1985, 1988); European Championships (1984–86); Soviet Championships (1986)	
Oleg Vasiliev	Soviet Union	Elena Valova	(silver) Winter Olympics (1988); World Championships (1984, 1986–87); European Championships (1983, 1987)	
Edmond Verbustel	Belgium	Suzanne Diskeuve	(bronze) World Championships (1947); European Championships (1947)	
Anna Vernikov	Israel	Evgeni Krasnopolski	(gold) Israeli Championships (2020)	
Maria Vigalova	Russia	Egor Zakroev	(silver) Junior Grand Prix Final (2013)	
Maria Vigalova	Russia	Egor Zakroev	(bronze) World Junior Championships (2014); Junior Grand Prix Final (2012, 2014)	
Maribel Vinson	United States	Thornton Coolidge; George Hill	(gold) U.S. Championships (1928–29, 1933, 1935–37)	
Aleksandr Vlasov	Soviet Union	Irina Vorobieva	(gold) Soviet Championships (1976)	
Aleksandr Vlasov	Soviet Union	Irina Vorobieva	(silver) World Championships (1977); European Championships (1977)	
Aleksandr Vlasov	Soviet Union	Irina Vorobieva	(bronze) World Championships (1976); European Championships (1976)	
Julia Vlassov	United States	Drew Meekins	(gold) World Junior Championships (2006)	
Julia Vlassov	United States	Drew Meekins	(silver) Junior Grand Prix Final (2005)	
Nikita Volodin	Russia	Alina Ustimkina	(bronze) Winter Youth Olympics (2016)	
Nikita Volodin	Germany	Minerva Fabienne Hase	(gold) European Championships (2025); Grand Prix Final (2023–24); German Championships (2019–20, 2022, 2024–25)	
Nikita Volodin	Germany	Minerva Fabienne Hase	(silver) World Championships (2025)	
Nikita Volodin	Germany	Minerva Fabienne Hase	(bronze) World Championships (2024); Grand Prix Final (2025)	
Tatiana Volosozhar	Ukraine	Petro Kharchenko; Stanislav Morozov	(gold) Ukrainian Championships (2004–05, 2007–08, 2010)	
Tatiana Volosozhar	Russia	Maxim Trankov	(gold) Winter Olympics (2014); World Championships (2013); European Championships (2012–14, 2016); Grand Prix Final (2012); Russian Championships (2011, 2013, 2016)	
Tatiana Volosozhar	Russia	Maxim Trankov	(silver) World Championships (2011–12); Grand Prix Final (2011, 2013)	
Irina Vorobieva	Soviet Union	Igor Lisovsky; Aleksandr Vlasov	(gold) World Championships (1981); European Championships (1981); Soviet Championships (1976)	
Irina Vorobieva	Soviet Union	Igor Lisovsky; Aleksandr Vlasov	(silver) World Championships (1977); European Championships (1977, 1979)	
Irina Vorobieva	Soviet Union	Igor Lisovsky; Aleksandr Vlasov	(bronze) World Championships (1976); European Championships (1976, 1982)	
Karel Vosátka	Czechoslovakia	Hana Dvořáková; Blažena Knittlová	(gold) Czechoslovak Championships (1959–61)	
Karel Vosátka	Czechoslovakia	Hana Dvořáková; Blažena Knittlová	(silver) European Championships (1948)	
Oxana Vouillamoz	Switzerland	Tom Bouvart	(gold) Swiss Championships (2025)	

== W ==
Skater	Nation	Partner(s)	Major championships	Ref.
Gillian Wachsman	United States	Todd Waggoner	(gold) U.S. Championships (1986)	
Todd Waggoner	United States	Gillian Wachsman	(gold) U.S. Championships (1986)	
Barbara Wagner	Canada	Robert Paul	(gold) Winter Olympics (1960); World Championships (1957–60); Canadian Championships (1956–60)	
Utako Wakamatsu	Canada	Jean-Sébastien Fecteau	(silver) Four Continents Championships (2006)	
Evelyn Walsh	Canada	Trennt Michaud	(bronze) Four Continents Championships (2022)	
Heinz-Ulrich Walther	East Germany	Heidemarie Steiner; Brigitte Wokoeck	(gold) East German Championships (1962, 1964, 1966–67, 1969–70)	
Heinz-Ulrich Walther	East Germany	Heidemarie Steiner; Brigitte Wokoeck	(bronze) World Championships (1970); European Championships (1967–68, 1970)	
Wang Lei	China	Peng Cheng; Wang Xuehan; Zhang Yue	(gold) Chinese Championships (2016, 2024)	
Wang Lei	China	Peng Cheng; Wang Xuehan; Zhang Yue	(silver) Junior Grand Prix Final (2008)	
Wang Lei	China	Peng Cheng; Wang Xuehan; Zhang Yue	(bronze) Junior Grand Prix Final (2009)	
Luke Wang	United States	Olivia Flores	(silver) World Junior Championships (2024)	
Wang Xuehan	China	Wang Lei	(gold) Chinese Championships (2016)	
Jill Watson	United States	Peter Oppegard	(gold) U.S. Championships (1985, 1987–88)	
Jill Watson	United States	Peter Oppegard	(bronze) Winter Olympics (1988); World Championships (1987)	
Theresa Weld	United States	Nathaniel Niles	(gold) U.S. Championships (1918, 1920–27)	
Daniel Wende	Germany	Maylin Wende	(gold) German Championships (2010, 2012)	
Maylin Wende	Germany	Daniel Wende	(gold) German Championships (2010, 2012)	
Herbert Wiesinger	West Germany	Almut Lehmann	(gold) German Championships (1971–73)	
Herbert Wiesinger	West Germany	Almut Lehmann	(bronze) European Championships (1973)	
Debbi Wilkes	Canada	Guy Revell	(gold) Canadian Championships (1963–64)	
Debbi Wilkes	Canada	Guy Revell	(silver) Winter Olympics (1964)	
Debbi Wilkes	Canada	Guy Revell	(bronze) World Championships (1964)	
Basil Williams	Great Britain	Phyllis Johnson	(bronze) Summer Olympics (1920)	
Harley Windsor	Australia	Ekaterina Alexandrovskaya	(gold) Australian Championships (2017, 2019); World Junior Championships (2017); Junior Grand Prix Final (2017)	
Kris Wirtz	Canada	Kristy Sargeant	(gold) Canadian Championships (1998–99)	
Kris Wirtz	Canada	Kristy Sargeant	(silver) Four Continents Championships (1999)	
Sean Wirtz	Canada	Elizabeth Putnam	(bronze) Four Continents Championships (2006)	
Brigitte Wokoeck	East Germany	Heinz-Ulrich Walther	(gold) East German Championships (1962, 1964)	
Mandy Wötzel	East Germany	Axel Rauschenbach; Ingo Steuer	(gold) East German Championships (1989–90)	
Mandy Wötzel	East Germany	Axel Rauschenbach; Ingo Steuer	(silver) European Championships (1989)	
Mandy Wötzel	Germany	Axel Rauschenbach; Ingo Steuer	(gold) World Championships (1997); European Championships (1995); Grand Prix Final (1996); German Championships (1991, 1993, 1995–97)	
Mandy Wötzel	Germany	Axel Rauschenbach; Ingo Steuer	(silver) World Championships (1993, 1996); European Championships (1993, 1996–97); Grand Prix Final (1997)	
Mandy Wötzel	Germany	Axel Rauschenbach; Ingo Steuer	(bronze) Winter Olympics (1998); Grand Prix Final (1995)	
Ludwig Wrede	Austria	Melitta Brunner; Herma Szabo	(gold) World Championships (1925, 1927); Austrian Championships (1923, 1925–26, 1930)	
Ludwig Wrede	Austria	Melitta Brunner; Herma Szabo	(silver) World Championships (1929–30)	
Ludwig Wrede	Austria	Melitta Brunner; Herma Szabo	(bronze) Winter Olympics (1928); World Championships (1926, 1928)	
Wu Yiming	China	Dong Huibo	(gold) Chinese Championships (2009)	
Wu Yiming	China	Dong Huibo	(bronze) World Junior Championships (2008)	

== Y ==
Skater	Nation	Partner(s)	Major championships	Ref.
Kristi Yamaguchi	United States	Rudy Galindo	(gold) U.S. Championships (1989–90); World Junior Championships (1988)	
Kristi Yamaguchi	United States	Rudy Galindo	(bronze) World Junior Championships (1987)	
Caitlin Yankowskas	United States	John Coughlin	(gold) U.S. Championships (2011)	
Caitlin Yankowskas	Great Britain	Hamish Gaman	(gold) British Championships (2015)	
Yu Xiaoyu	China	Jin Yang; Zhang Hao	(gold) Chinese Championships (2013, 2015, 2018); Winter Youth Olympics (2012); World Junior Championships (2014–15); Junior Grand Prix Final (2013)	
Yu Xiaoyu	China	Jin Yang; Zhang Hao	(silver) Grand Prix Final (2017); World Junior Championships (2012)	
Yu Xiaoyu	China	Jin Yang; Zhang Hao	(bronze) Four Continents Championships (2016); Junior Grand Prix Final (2010)	

== Z ==
Skater	Nation	Partner(s)	Major championships	Ref.
Natalia Zabiiako	Estonia	Sergei Kulbach; Sergei Muhhin	(gold) Estonian Championships (2010–11)	
Natalia Zabiiako	Russia	Alexander Enbert	(silver) Winter Olympics (2018)	
Natalia Zabiiako	Russia	Alexander Enbert	(bronze) World Championships (2019); European Championships (2018)	
Alexander Zaitsev	Soviet Union	Irina Rodnina	(gold) Winter Olympics (1976, 1980); World Championships (1973–78); European Championships (1973–78, 1980); Soviet Championships (1973–75, 1977)	
Stanislav Zakharov	Russia	Elena Riabchuk	(gold) World Junior Championships (2002)	
Egor Zakroev	Russia	Maria Vigalova	(silver) Junior Grand Prix Final (2013)	
Egor Zakroev	Russia	Maria Vigalova	(bronze) World Junior Championships (2014); Junior Grand Prix Final (2012, 2014)	
Filip Zalevski	Bulgaria	Nina Ivanova	(gold) Bulgarian Championships (2009–10)	
Zhang Dan	China	Zhang Hao	(gold) Four Continents Championships (2005, 2010); Chinese Championships (2003, 2008, 2012); World Junior Championships (2001, 2003); Junior Grand Prix Final (2000–01)	
Zhang Dan	China	Zhang Hao	(silver) Winter Olympics (2006); World Championships (2006, 2008–09); Four Continents Championships (2004, 2008); Grand Prix Final (2005, 2007–08)	
Zhang Dan	China	Zhang Hao	(bronze) World Championships (2005); Four Continents Championships (2002–03, 2009); Grand Prix Final (2006)	
Zhang Hao	China	Peng Cheng; Yu Xiaoyu; Zhang Dan	(gold) Four Continents Championships (2005, 2010); Chinese Championships (2003, 2008, 2012–13, 2018); World Junior Championships (2001, 2003); Junior Grand Prix Final (2000–01)	
Zhang Hao	China	Peng Cheng; Yu Xiaoyu; Zhang Dan	(silver) Winter Olympics (2006); World Championships (2006, 2008–09); Four Continents Championships (2004, 2008, 2015); Grand Prix Final (2005, 2007–08, 2016)	
Zhang Hao	China	Peng Cheng; Yu Xiaoyu; Zhang Dan	(bronze) World Championships (2005); Four Continents Championships (2002–03, 2009); Grand Prix Final (2006)	
Zhang Yue	China	Wang Lei	(silver) Junior Grand Prix Final (2008)	
Zhang Yue	China	Wang Lei	(bronze) Junior Grand Prix Final (2009)	
Zhao Hongbo	China	Shen Xue	(gold) Winter Olympics (2010); World Championships (2002–03, 2007); Four Continents Championships (1999, 2003, 2007); Grand Prix Final (1998–99, 2003–04, 2006, 2009); Chinese Championships (1993–94, 1996–99, 2001–02)	
Zhao Hongbo	China	Shen Xue	(silver) World Championships (1999–2000, 2004); Four Continents Championships (2001); Grand Prix Final (2002)	
Zhao Hongbo	China	Shen Xue	(bronze) Winter Olympics (2002, 2006); World Championships (2001); Grand Prix Final (2000–01)	
Zhao Rui	China	An Yang	(gold) Chinese Championships (2006)	
Vladislav Zhovnirski	Russia	Victoria Maksyuta	(gold) World Junior Championships (1996)	
Vladislav Zhovnirski	Russia	Victoria Maksyuta	(silver) Junior Grand Prix Final (1997)	
Vladislav Zhovnirski	Russia	Victoria Maksyuta	(bronze) World Junior Championships (1997–99); Junior Grand Prix Final (1998)	
Nina Zhuk	Soviet Union	Stanislav Zhuk	(gold) Soviet Championships (1957–59, 1961)	
Nina Zhuk	Soviet Union	Stanislav Zhuk	(silver) European Championships (1958–60)	
Stanislav Zhuk	Soviet Union	Nina Zhuk	(gold) Soviet Championships (1957–59, 1961)	
Stanislav Zhuk	Soviet Union	Nina Zhuk	(silver) European Championships (1958–60)	
Tatyana Zhuk	Soviet Union	Alexander Gavrilov; Aleksandr Gorelik	(gold) Soviet Championships (1960)	
Tatyana Zhuk	Soviet Union	Alexander Gavrilov; Aleksandr Gorelik	(silver) Winter Olympics (1968); World Championships (1966, 1968); European Championships (1966, 1968)	
Tatyana Zhuk	Soviet Union	Alexander Gavrilov; Aleksandr Gorelik	(bronze) World Championships (1963, 1965); European Championships (1963–65)	
Miriam Ziegler	Austria	Severin Kiefer	(gold) Austrian Championships (2014–16, 2018, 2020–22)	
Ronald Zilberberg	Israel	Adel Tankova	(gold) Israeli Championships (2018)	
John Zimmerman	United States	Kyoko Ina	(gold) U.S. Championships (2000–02)	
John Zimmerman	United States	Kyoko Ina	(silver) Four Continents Championships (2000)	
John Zimmerman	United States	Kyoko Ina	(bronze) World Championships (2002); Four Continents Championships (2001)	
Artem Znachkov	Armenia	Maria Krasiltseva	(gold) Armenian Championships (2003–04)	
Jelizaveta Žuková	Czech Republic	Martin Bidař	(gold) Czech Championships (2020–21)	
Karl Zwack	Austria	Idi Papez	(gold) European Championships (1933); Austrian Championships (1933–35)	
Karl Zwack	Austria	Idi Papez	(silver) World Championships (1933–34); European Championships (1934–35)	
Karl Zwack	Austria	Idi Papez	(bronze) World Championships (1931); European Championships (1932)	

== See also ==
- List of figure skaters (men's singles)
- List of figure skaters (women's singles)
- List of figure skaters (ice dance)
