= Zhao Rui =

Zhao Rui may refer to:

- Zhao Rui (basketball) (born 1996), Chinese basketball player
- Zhao Rui (figure skater) (born 1991), Chinese pair skater
