= Anyang (disambiguation) =

Anyang (安阳市) is a prefecture-level city in the north of Henan, China and the former capital of the Shang Dynasty

Anyang or An Yang may also refer to:

== China ==
- Anyang County (安阳县), Anyang, Henan
- Anyang River (安阳河), or Huan River, tributary of the Yellow River
- Anyang (安陽), the name of Wang Ze's state during the Song dynasty
- Anyang Subdistrict, Rui'an, Zhejiang

Towns

- Anyang, Guangxi, subdivision of Du'an Yao Autonomous County, Guangxi
- Anyang, Hubei, subdivision of Yunyang District, Shiyan, Hubei

Townships

- Anyang Township, Gansu, subdivision of Ganzhou District, Zhangye, Gansu
- Anyang Township, Hebei, subdivision of Shunping County, Hebei
- Anyang Township, Zhejiang, subdivision of Chun'an County, Zhejiang

== South Korea ==
- Anyang, Gyeonggi

== Other ==
- USS Kimberly (DD-521), loaned to the Republic of China Navy in Taiwan as ROCS An Yang DD-18/DDG918, 1967–1999

== See also ==
- An Yang (安洋; born 1984), Chinese figure skater
