= 1993 World Junior Figure Skating Championships =

- Type: ISU Championship
- Date: December 1 – 6, 1992
- Season: 1992–93
- Location: Seoul, South Korea
- Previous: 1992 World Junior Championships
- Next: 1994 World Junior Championships

The 1993 World Junior Figure Skating Championships were held on December 1–6, 1992 in Seoul, South Korea. The event was sanctioned by the International Skating Union and open to ISU member nations. Medals were awarded in the disciplines of men's singles, ladies' singles, pair skating, and ice dancing.

== Results ==
=== Men ===
Rank	Name	Nation	TFP	SP	FS
1	Evgeni Pliuta	Ukraine	1.5	1	1
2	Michael Weiss	United States	5.5	7	2
3	Ilia Kulik	Russia	5.5	3	4
4	John Bevan	United States			
5	Jeff Langdon	Canada		5	
6	Liu Yueming	China			
7	Alexander Abt	Russia			
8	Andrejs Vlascenko	Latvia			
9	Ryan Hunka	United States			
10	Seiichi Suzuki	Japan			
11	Yvan Desjardins	Canada		14	
12	Michael Hopfes	Germany			
13	Gaku Aiyoshi	Japan			
14	Roman Serov	Russia			
15	Eran Sragowicz	Germany			
16	Ivo Frycer	Czechoslovakia			
17	Markus Leminen	Finland			
18	Stanick Jeannette	France			
19	Johnny Rønne Jensen	Denmark			
20	Stuart Clays	United Kingdom			
21	Daniel Peinado	Spain			
22	Roman Martõnenko	Estonia			
23	Szabolcs Vidrai	Hungary			
24	Ivan Dinev	Bulgaria			
25	Jin Yun-ki	South Korea			

=== Ladies ===
Rank	Name	Nation	TFP	SP	FS
1	Kumiko Koiwai	Japan	1.5	1	1
2	Lisa Ervin	United States	4.0	4	2
3	Tanja Szewczenko	Germany	4.0	2	3
4	Marie-Pierre Leray	France	8.5		
5	Alice Sue Claeys	Belgium	10.0		
6	Anna Rechnio	Poland	10.5	13	4
7	Krisztina Czakó	Hungary	11.5		
8	Irina Slutskaya	Russia	12.0		
9	Rena Inoue	Japan	14.0		
10	Elena Liashenko	Ukraine	17.5		
11	Viktoria Dimitrova	Bulgaria	18.0		
12	Astrid Hochstetter	Germany	18.0		
13	Sherry Ball	Canada	18.0	6	15
14	Liu Xin	China	18.5		
15	Nadezhda Kovalevskaya	Russia	21.5		
16	Nicole Bobek	United States	21.5	7	18
17	Irena Zemanová	Czechoslovakia			
18	Emma Warmington	United Kingdom			
19	Caroline Song	United States			20
20	Hannele Lundstrom	Finland			
21	Sarah Abitbol	France			
22	Andrea Kus	Austria			
23	Liu Ying	China			
24	Park Boon-sun	South Korea			

=== Pairs ===
Rank	Name	Nation	TFP	SP	FS
1	Inga Korshunova / Dmitri Saveliev	Russia	2.0	2	1
2	Maria Petrova / Anton Sikharulidze	Russia	2.5	1	2
3	Isabelle Coulombe / Bruno Marcotte	Canada	4.5	3	3
4	Robin Heckler / Jeff Tilley	United States	6.0	4	4
5	Nicole Sciarrotta / Gregory Sciarrotta	United States	8.0	6	5
6	Oksana Chupkena / Pavel Charlden	Russia	8.5	5	6
7	Julie Laporte / David Pelletier	Canada	11.5	9	7
8	Kelly MacKenzie / David Annecca	Canada	12.0	8	8
9	Nadine Pflaum / Kristijan Simeunovic	Germany	12.5	7	9
10	Svitlana Glushak / Evgeni Zhigurski	Ukraine	15.0	10	10
11	Sarah Abitbol / Stephane Bernadis	France	17.5	13	11
12	Nigora Karabaeva / Evgeni Sviridov	Uzbekistan	18.0	12	12
13	Ulrike Gerstl / Björn Lobenwein	Austria	18.5	11	13

=== Ice dancing ===
Rank	Name	Nation	TFP	CD1	CD2	OD	FD
1	Ekaterina Svirina / Sergei Sakhnovski	Russia	2.8	3	3	1	1
2	Sylwia Nowak / Sebastian Kolasiński	Poland	3.8	2	1	2	2
3	Bérangère Nau / Luc Monéger	France	5.4	1	2	3	3
4	Elizabeth Hollett / Pierre-Hugues Chouinard	Canada	8.0	4	4	4	4
5	Agnès Jacquemard / Alexis Gayet	France	10.0	5	5	5	5
6	Lisa Dunn / John Dunn	United Kingdom	13.2	7	6	6	7
7	Christina Fitzgerald / Mark Fitzgerald	United States	15.0	9	9	9	6
8	Anna Semenovich / Denis Samokhin	Russia	16.8	6	7	7	10
9	Josée Piché / Pascal Denis	Canada	17.0	8	8	8	9
10	Ekaterina Davydova / Roman Kostomarov	Russia	18.8	11	10	11	8
11	Olga Mudrak / Vitaliy Baranov	Ukraine	20.2	10	11	10	10
12	Marisa Gravino / Patrice Lauzon	Canada	24.0	12	12	12	12
13	Claudia Frigoli / Maurizio Margaglio	Italy	26.2	13	14	13	13
14	Šárka Vondrková / Lukáš Král	Czechoslovakia	27.8	14	13	14	14
15	Yuki Habuki / Akiyuki Kido	Japan	30.0	15	15	15	15
16	Alena Kramplová / Jan Nerad	Czechoslovakia					
17	Kornélia Bárány / Peter Schreier	Hungary					
18	Kristina Kalesnik / Aleksander Terentjev	Estonia					
19	Yulia Rizhova / Dmitri Belik	Uzbekistan					
