= Manuela Landgraf =

East German pair skater

Figure skating career
- Country: East Germany
Medal record
Representing East Germany
Figure skating: Pairs
World Junior Championships
Gold medal – first place	1984 Sapporo	Pairs

Manuela Landgraf is a former East German pair skater. She won the 1984 World Junior Figure Skating Championships with partner Ingo Steuer.

== Competitive highlights ==
(with Steuer)

International
Event	1982–83	1983–84	1984–85	1985–86
World Championships			8th	11th
European Championships			5th	5th
International: Junior
World Junior Champ.	4th	1st		
Grand Prize SNP		2nd		
National
East German Champ.			2nd	
