= Dmitry Saveliev (pair skater) =

Russian former pair skater

Figure skating career
- Country: Russia
Medal record
Representing Russia
Figure skating: Pairs
World Junior Championships
Gold medal – first place	1993 Seoul	Pairs

Dmitry Saveliev (Russian: Дмитрий Савельев) is a Russian former pair skater. With Inga Korshunova, he won the 1993 World Junior Championships and the 1992 Blue Swords. The pair were coached by Valeriy Tiukov and Valentina Tiukova at SDIUSHOR Orlenok in Perm.
