= Inga Korshunova =

Russian figure skater

Figure skating career
- Country: Russia
Medal record
Representing Russia
Figure skating: Pairs
World Junior Championships
Gold medal – first place	1993 Seoul	Pairs

Inga Korshunova (Russian: Инга Коршунова) is a Russian former pair skater. With Dmitry Saveliev, she won the 1993 World Junior Championships and the 1992 Blue Swords. She was a silver medalist at the 1993 Junior Russian Nationals. They were coached by Valeriy Tiukov and Valentina Tiukova at SDIUSHOR Orlenok in Perm.

In 1994, she was awarded the title of Master of Sport of Russia by the Russian Figure Skating Federation.
