= Amanda Sunyoto-Yang =

American pair skater (born 1992)

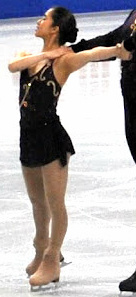
- 2009 Four Continents Championship

Personal information
- Born: July 8, 1992 (age 34) Los Angeles, California, U.S.
- Home town: San Marino, California, U.S.
- Height: 4 ft 11 in (1.50 m)

Figure skating career
- Country: Chinese Taipei
- Partner: Darryll Sulindro-Yang
- Coach: Peter Oppegard
- Skating club: Orange County FSC

Amanda Sunyoto-Yang (simplified Chinese: 杨雪芬; traditional Chinese: 楊雪芬; pinyin: Yáng Xuěfēn) (born July 8, 1992) is an American pair skater who competes internationally for Taiwan. In 2011, she competed at the Asian Winter Games, as a singles skater, placing 13th. Competing in pair skating with her brother, Darryll Sulindro-Yang, she is a five-time Taiwanese national champion (2006, 2007, 2008, 2009, and 2010).

== Personal life ==
Sunyoto-Yang was born on July 8, 1992, in Los Angeles, California. She is pursuing a career in dentistry. She speaks Mandarin Chinese and has a gymnastics background.

== Skating career ==
Sunyoto-Yang started skating at the age of four in Singapore, where she was living at the time. Before moving to the United States, her family lived in Singapore for six years and Taiwan for two years.

In 2004, Sunyoto-Yang teamed up with her brother, Darryll Sulindro-Yang. They are the first pair team to represent Chinese Taipei in an international competition, which was the 2007 World Junior Figure Skating Championships. They are coached by Peter Oppegard and train at the East West Ice Palace in Artesia, California.

During the 2009–2010 season, they competed at the Nebelhorn Trophy competition, where they finished as the first alternates for the 2010 Winter Olympic Games.

=== Competitive highlights ===
(with Darryll Sulindro-Yang)

Event	2006–2007	2007–2008	2008–2009	2009–2010
World Championships			22nd	20th
Four Continents Championships			10th	11th
World Junior Championships	12th	13th		
Chinese Taipei Championships		1st	1st	1st
Junior Grand Prix, Budapest	10th			
Junior Grand Prix, Taipei	9th			
Junior Grand Prix, Lake Placid		8th		
Junior Grand Prix, Sheffield		12th		
Nebelhorn Trophy				13th

=== Programs ===
(with Darryll Sulindro-Yang)

Season	Short program	Free skating	Exhibition
2009–2010	Walking in the Air by Howard Blake	Bridge to Terebithia by Aaron Zigman; The Chronicles of Narnia by Harry Gregson-Williams	
2006–2007	Beautiful Energy	New World Concerto by Maksim Mrvica	
