= Darryll Sulindro-Yang =

American figure skater (born 1987)

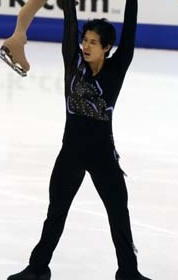

Personal information
- Other names: Adrian Darryll Sulindro
- Born: October 26, 1987 (age 38) Los Angeles, California, U.S.
- Home town: San Marino
- Height: 5 ft 11 in (1.80 m)

Figure skating career
- Country: Chinese Taipei
- Partner: Amanda Sunyoto-Yang
- Coach: Peter Oppegard
- Skating club: Orange County FSC

Darryll Sulindro-Yang (Chinese: 杨周宏, alt name: Adrian Darryll Sulindro, born October 26, 1987 in Los Angeles, California) is an American figure skater who competed for Taiwan in both singles and pairs. In pairs, he competed with sister Amanda Sunyoto-Yang. They are the five-time Taiwanese national champions. Darryll Sulindro-Yang is a Physical Medicine and Rehabilitation and Interventional Pain Management physician. He obtained his residency training at Icahn School of Medicine at Mount Sinai in New York City, his fellowship training in Interventional Pain Management at the University of California, Irvine and is currently a practicing Pain Management physician in Los Angeles.

== Results ==
(with Amanda Sunyoto-Yang)

Event	2006–2007	2007–2008	2008–2009	2009–2010
World Championships			22nd	20th
Four Continents Championships			10th	11th
World Junior Championships	12th	13th		
Chinese Taipei Championships		1st	1st	1st
Junior Grand Prix, Budapest	10th			
Junior Grand Prix, Taipei	9th			
Junior Grand Prix, Lake Placid		8th		
Junior Grand Prix, Sheffield		12th		
Nebelhorn Trophy				13th

== Programs ==
(with Amanda Sunyoto-Yang)

Season	Short program	Free skating	Exhibition
2009–2010	Walking in the Air by Howard Blake	Bridge to Terebithia by Aaron Zigman; The Chronicles of Narnia by Harry Gregson-Williams	
2006–2007	Beautiful Energy	New World Concerto by Maksim Mrvica	
