= Zhao Rui (figure skater) =

Chinese pair skater (born 1991)

Personal information
- Born: February 21, 1991 (age 35)
- Height: 143 cm (4 ft 8 in)

Figure skating career
- Country: China
- Partner: An Yang
- Coach: Yanwei Sha

Zhao Rui (Chinese: 赵锐, born February 21, 1991, in Harbin) is a Chinese pair skater. She competes with An Yang. They were the 2006 Chinese national champions.
