= An Yang =

Chinese pair skater

Personal information
- Born: July 23, 1984 (age 41)
- Height: 1.70 m (5 ft 7 in)

Figure skating career
- Country: China
- Partner: Zhao Rui
- Coach: Yanwei Sha

An Yang (Chinese: 安洋; pinyin: Ān Yáng; born July 23, 1984, in Harbin) is a Chinese pair skater. He competes with Zhao Rui. They are the 2006 Chinese national champions.
