= Swiss Figure Skating Championships =

Recurring figure skating competition

- Status: Active
- Genre: National championships
- Frequency: Annual
- Country: Switzerland
- Inaugurated: 1919
- Organizer: Swiss Ice Skating

The Swiss Figure Skating Championships (German: Schweizermeisterschaften Elite Kunstlaufen und Eistanzen; French: Championnats Suisses Elite Patinage Artistique et Danse sur Glace) are an annual figure skating competition organized by Swiss Ice Skating to crown the national champions of Switzerland. National championships in figure skating were first held in Switzerland alongside speed skating and ice hockey in 1919 in St. Moritz. Competitions were held intermittently in St. Moritz between 1919 and 1927, as the availability of suitable ice surfaces, like frozen rinks and lakes, was dependent on the weather. When the championships returned in 1931, a separate event for women was included. Pair skating was added as an event in 1933, and ice dance in 1960. Since 1931, the Swiss Championships have been cancelled only once: in 2021, owing to the COVID-19 pandemic.

Medals are awarded in men's singles, women's singles, pair skating, and ice dance at the senior and junior levels, although each discipline may not necessarily be held every year due to a lack of participants. Oliver Höner holds the record for winning the most Swiss Championship titles in men's singles (with eleven), Sarah Meier holds the record in women's singles (with eight), and Diane Gerencser holds the record for winning the most Swiss Championship titles in ice dance (with six), although these were not all with the same partner. Two teams are tied for winning the most Swiss Championship titles in pair skating (with nine each): Pierette Dubois and Paul Dubois, and Gerda Johner and Rüdi Johner.

== Senior medalists ==
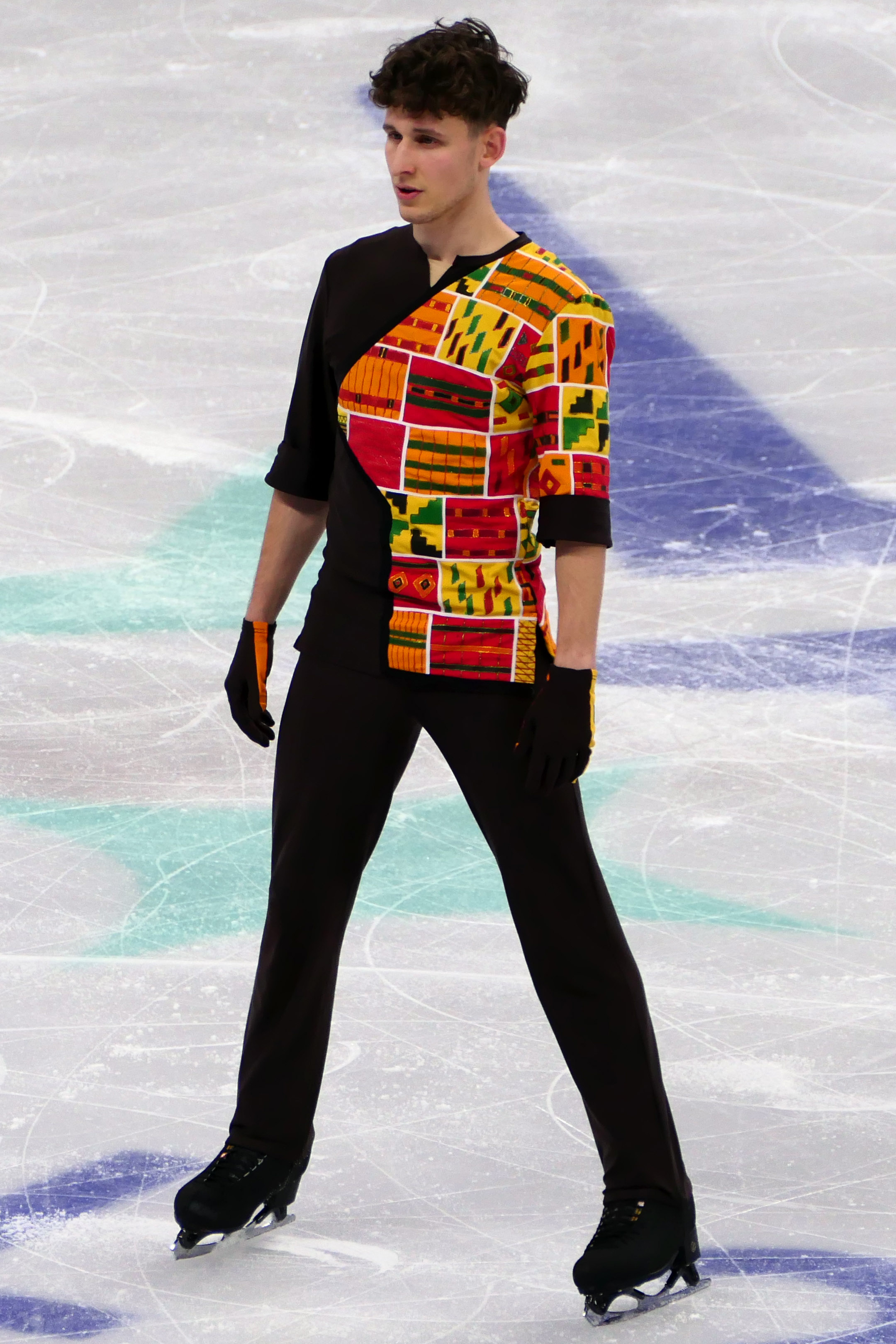
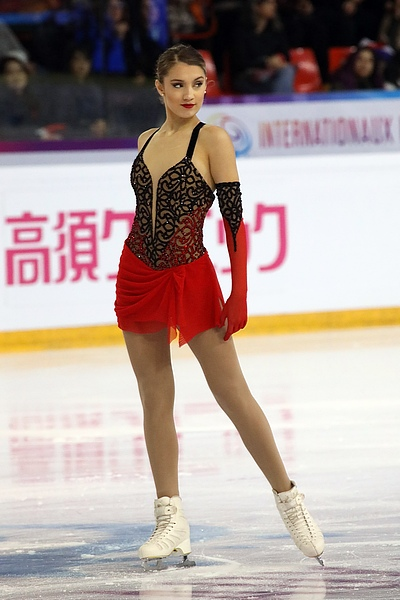
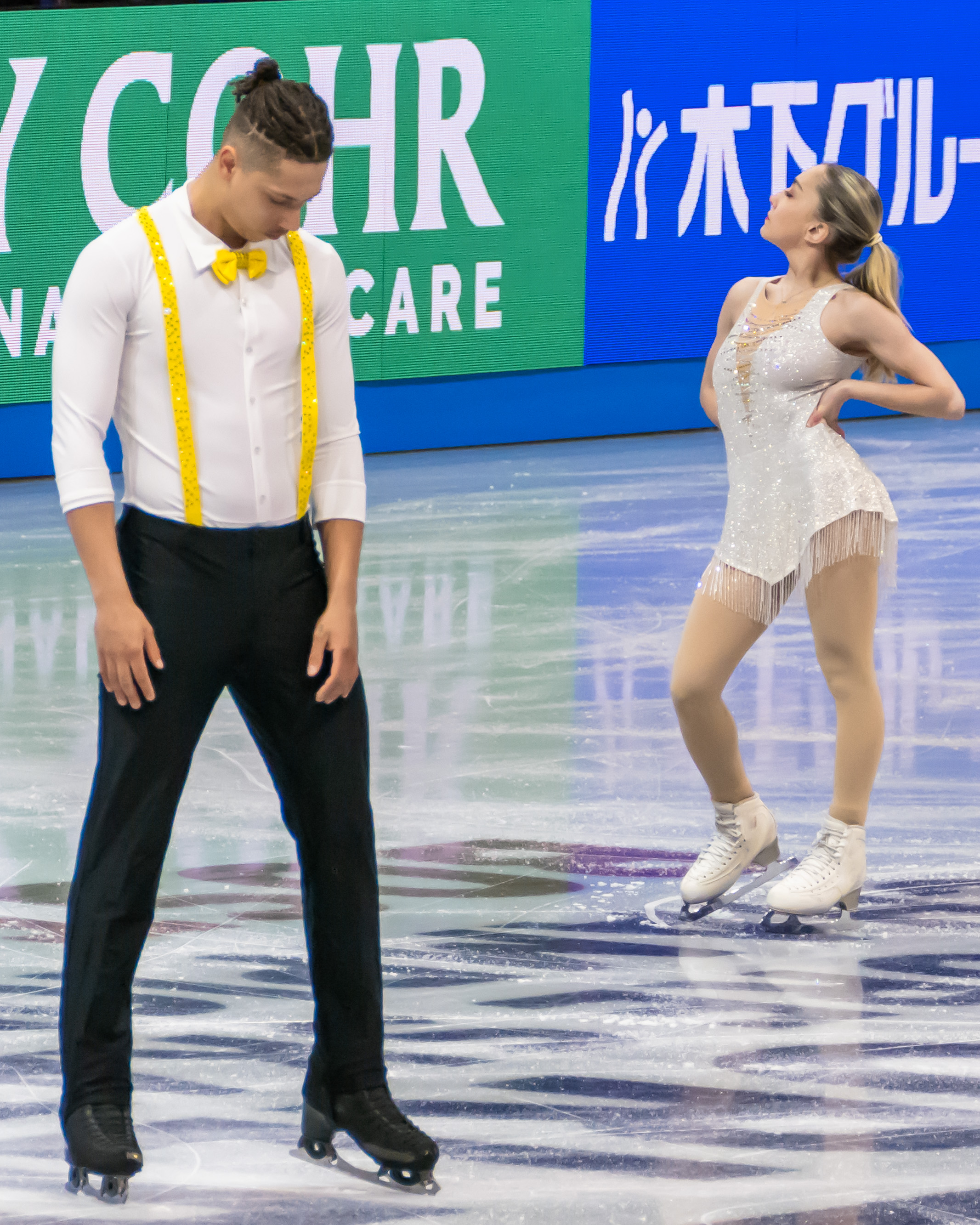
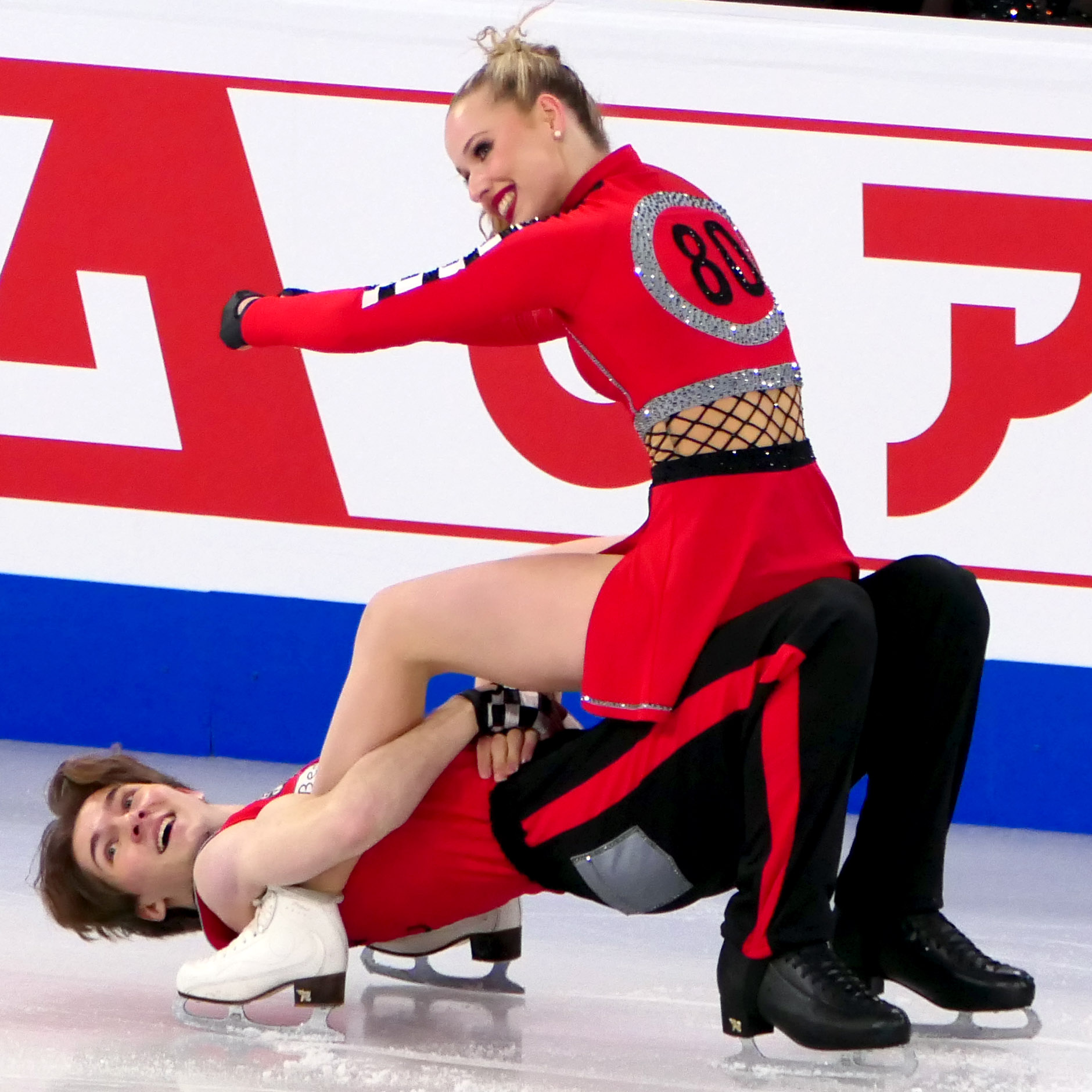
From left to right: Lukas Britschgi, six-time Swiss champion in men's singles; Alexia Paganini, three-time Swiss champion in women's singles; Tom Bouvart and Oxana Vouillamoz, two-time Swiss champions in pair skating; and Gina Zehnder and Beda Leon Sieber, two-time Swiss champions in ice dance

=== Men's singles ===
Senior men's event results
Year	Location	Gold	Silver	Bronze	Ref.
1919	St. Moritz	Alfred Mégroz	Georges Gautschi	No other competitors	
1920	No competition held				
1921	St. Moritz	Alfred Mégroz	No other competitors		
1922–23	No competitions held				
1924	St. Moritz	Alfred Mégroz	Charles Willi	H. Merker	
1925	No competition held				
1926	Davos	Georges Gautschi	O. Meyer	G. Reinhart	
1927	St. Moritz	Georges Gautschi	Edwin Keller	Theophil Stäubli	
1928–30	No competitions held				
1931	Zurich	Georges Gautschi	Heinz Cattani	Edwin Keller	
1932	Zurich	Heinz Cattani	Edwin Keller	Theophil Stäubli	
1933	Engelberg	Edwin Keller	Othmar Jordi	Heinz Cattani	
1934	Bern	Edwin Keller	Lucian Büeler	Ernst Fenner	
1935	Basel	Lucian Büeler	Ernst Fenner	Alexander Schlageter	
1936	Arosa	Lucian Büeler	Hans Kunz	Emil Sommerhalder	
1937	Davos	Lucian Büeler	Ernst Fenner	Charles Rima	
1938	Bern	Hans Gerschwiler	Martin Enderlin	Jakob Biedermann	
1939	Arosa	Hans Gerschwiler	Jacob Biedermann	Marcel Leimgruber	
1940	Arosa	Karl Enderlin	Marcel Leimgruber	Rolf Wieser	
1941	Glarus	Karl Enderlin	Rolf Wieser	A. Stämpfli	
1942	Arosa	Karl Enderlin	Rolf Wieser	Fritz Dürst	
1943	Lausanne	Fritz Durst	Max Frei	No other competitors	
1944	Davos	Kurt Sönning	Rolf Wieser	Marcel Leimgruber	
1945	Zurich	Karl Enderlin	Kurt Sönning	Rolf Wieser	
1946	Davos	Hans Gerschwiler	Fritz Durst	Kurt Sönning	
1947	Arosa	Hans Gerschwiler	François Pache	No other competitors	
1948	Davos	Hans Gerschwiler	Karl Enderlin	François Pache	
1949	Lausanne	Kurt Sönning	François Pache	Gérald Desbaillet	
1950	Basel	Kurt Sönning	François Pache	Gérald Desbaillet	
1951	Klosters	François Pache	Fritz Loosli	Roland Schenkel	
1952	Flims	François Pache	Fritz Loosli	Gérald Desbaillet	
1953	Arosa	Hubert Köpfler	François Pache	André Calame	
1954	Villars-sur-Ollon	François Pache	Hans Müller	Fritz Loosli	
1955	Flims	Hans Müller	Kurt Pulver	Gérald Desbaillet	
1956	Basel	François Pache	Hans Müller	Hubert Köpfler	
1957	Arosa	Hubert Köpfler	François Pache	No other competitors	
1958	Zurich	François Pache	No other competitors		
1959	Lausanne	Hubert Köpfler	François Pache	Marcel Paris	
1960	Winterthur	Hubert Köpfler	François Pache	Markus Germann	
1961	Arosa	Hubert Köpfler	François Pache	Markus Germann	
1962	Neuchâtel	François Pache	Markus Germann	Hans-Jörg Studer	
1963	Zurich	Markus Germann	Hans-Jörg Studer	Peter Grütter	
1964	Winterthur	Markus Germann	Hans-Jörg Studer	Peter Stöhr	
1965	Geneva	Hans-Jörg Studer	Peter Grütter	Peter Stöhr	
1966	Lucerne	Hans-Jörg Studer	Daniel Höner	Peter Grütter	
1967	Basel	Daniel Höner	Jean-Pierre Devenoges	Blaise Rossinelli	
1968	Zurich	Daniel Höner	Jean-Pierre Devenoges	Blaise Rossinelli	
1969	Lausanne	Daniel Höner	Jean-Pierre Devenoges	Meinrad Rössli	
1970	Winterthur	Daniel Höner	Gaston Schäffer	Meinrad Rössli	
1971	St. Gallen	Daniel Höner	Bernard Bauer	Gaston Schäffer	
1972	Bern	Daniel Höner	Gaston Schäffer	No other competitors	
1973	Basel	Daniel Höner	Leonardo Lienhard	Stéphane Prince	
1974	Geneva	Stéphane Prince (Note: Stéphane Prince did not achieve the minimum required score to be named the Swiss champion.)	Leonardo Lienhard	No other competitors	
1975	Villars-sur-Ollon	No men's competitors			
1976	Bern	Martin Sochor	Daniel Fürer	No other competitors	
1977	La Chaux-de-Fonds	Richard Furrer	Daniel Fürer	Martin Sochor	
1978	Herisau	Daniel Fürer	Richard Furrer	No other competitors	
1979	Aarau	Oliver Höner	Richard Furrer	Marco Scheibler	
1980	Bern	Oliver Höner	Marco Scheibler	Roberto Cavallaro	
1981	Lausanne	Richard Furrer	Eugenio Biaggini	Paul Sonderegger	
1982	Zurich	Oliver Höner	Richard Furrer	Eugenio Biaggini	
1983	Arosa	Richard Furrer	Didier Dieufils	Eugenio Biaggini	
1984	Geneva	Oliver Höner	Richard Furrer	Didier Dieufils	
1985	Lausanne	Oliver Höner	Paul Sonderegger	Adrian Anliker	
1986	Porrentruy	Oliver Höner	Mark Bachofen	Paul Sonderegger	
1987	Bern	Oliver Höner	Mark Bachofen	Paul Sonderegger	
1988	Lucerne	Oliver Höner	Alexandro Lo Monte	Mark Bachofen	
1989	Zurich	Oliver Höner	Sandro Bosshard	Theo Portmann	
1990	Lausanne	Oliver Höner	Paul Sonderegger	Daniel Galliker	
1991	Olten	Oliver Höner	Paul Sonderegger	Patrick Meier	
1992	Monthey	Patrick Meier	Paul Sonderegger	Daniel Galliker	
1993	Bern	Nicolas Binz	Paul Sonderegger	Patrick Meier	
1994	Neuchâtel	Patrick Meier	Nicolas Binz	Paul Sonderegger	
1995	Davos	Marius Negrea	Patrick Meier	Nicolas Binz	
1996	Lugano	Patrick Meier	Nicolas Binz	Pierre-Daniel Liaudat	
1997	Grindelwald	Patrick Meier	Andreas von Arb	Nicolas Binz	
1998	Schaffhausen	Patrick Meier	Oscar Peter	Nicolas Binz	
1999	Lausanne	Patrick Meier	Oscar Peter	No other competitors	
2000	Lugano	Patrick Meier	Oscar Peter	No other competitors	
2001	Geneva	Stéphane Lambiel	Patrick Meier	Oscar Peter	
2002	Zurich	Stéphane Lambiel	Jamal Othman	Oscar Peter	
2003	Zug	Stéphane Lambiel	Raphaël Bohren	Patrick Meier	
2004	Neuchâtel	Stéphane Lambiel	Patrick Meier	Jamal Othman	
2005	Lausanne	Stéphane Lambiel	Jamal Othman	Moris Pfeifhofer	
2006	Biasca	Stéphane Lambiel	Jamal Othman	Raphaël Bohren	
2007	Geneva	Stéphane Lambiel	Jamal Othman	Moris Pfeifhofer	
2008	Winterthur	Stéphane Lambiel	Moris Pfeifhofer	Jamal Othman	
2009	La Chaux-de-Fonds	Jamal Othman	Tomi Pulkkinen	Mikael Redin	
2010	Lugano	Stéphane Lambiel	Jamal Othman	Mikael Redin	
2011	Zug	Mikael Redin	Laurent Alvarez	Stéphane Walker	
2012	Basel	Laurent Alvarez	Stéphane Walker	Mikael Redin	
2013	Geneva	Stéphane Walker	Nicolas Dubois	Mikael Redin	
2014	La Chaux-de-Fonds	Stéphane Walker	Mikael Redin	Nicola Todeschini	
2015	Lugano	Nicola Todeschini	Vincent Cuérel	Nicolas Dubois	
2016	Lausanne	Stéphane Walker	Nicola Todeschini	Nicolas Dubois	
2017	Lucerne	Stéphane Walker	Lukas Britschgi	Nurullah Sahaka	
2018	Neuchâtel	Stéphane Walker	Nicola Todeschini	Lukas Britschgi	
2019	Wetzikon	Lukas Britschgi	Nurullah Sahaka	Tomàs Guarino Sabaté	
2020	Biel/Bienne	Lukas Britschgi	Nurullah Sahaka	Nicola Todeschini	
2021	St. Moritz	Competition cancelled due to the COVID-19 pandemic			
2022	Lucerne	Lukas Britschgi	Egor Murashov	Nurullah Sahaka	
2023	Chur	Nurullah Sahaka	Micha Steffen	Noah Bodenstein	
2024	Küsnacht	Lukas Britschgi	Georgii Pavlov	Nico Steffen	
2025	Geneva	Lukas Britschgi	Noah Bodenstein	Nico Steffen	
2026	Lugano	Lukas Britschgi	Ean Weiler	Georgii Pavlov	

=== Women's singles ===
Senior women's event medalists
Year	Location	Gold	Silver	Bronze	Ref.
1931	Zurich	Edith Gautschi	Edwige Rogger	Lilly Kuhn	
1932	Zurich	Edith Gautschi	Edwige Rogger	O. Saratz	
1933	Engelberg	Guldborg Sjursen	O. Saratz	Dora Wehrli	
1934	Bern	Guldborg Sjursen	Angela Anderes	Edwige Rogger	
1935	Basel	Angela Anderes	Trixli Bon	Dora Wehrli	
1936	Arosa	Angela Anderes	Herta Frey-Dexler	Edwige Rogger	
1937	Davos	Angela Anderes	Herta Frey-Dexler	Inge Manger	
1938	Bern	Inge Manger	Angela Anderes	Gertrud Flury	
1939	Arosa	Angela Anderes	Ilse Schottländer	Gertrud Flury	
1940	Arosa	Angela Anderes	Ursula Arnold	Ilse Schottlander	
1941	Glarus	Ilse Schottlander	Ursula Arnold	Verena Schulthess	
1942	Arosa	Ursula Arnold	Anna Oetiker	Maja Hug	
1943	Lausanne	Doris Blanc	Ursula Arnold	Maja Hug	
1944	Davos	Ursula Arnold	Maja Hug	Trudy Hufschmied	
1945	Zurich	Maja Hug	Doris Blanc	Helene Bantli	
1946	Davos	Maja Hug	Ursula Arnold	Doris Blanc	
1947	Arosa	Maja Hug	Lotti Höner	No other competitors	
1948	Davos	Maja Hug	Lotti Höner	Doris Blanc	
1949	Lausanne	Maja Hug	Ghislaine Kopf	Regula Arnold	
1950	Basel	Maja Hug	Regula Arnold	Ghislaine Kopf	
1951	Klosters	Yolande Jobin	Susi Wirz	Ghislaine Kopf	
1952	Flims	Susi Wirz	Yolande Jobin	Doris Zerbe	
1953	Arosa	Doris Zerbe	Yolande Jobin	Alice Fischer	
1954	Villars-sur-Ollon	Georgette Fischer	Alice Fischer	Elvira Schürr	
1955	Flims	Georgette Fischer	Alice Fischer	Carine Borner	
1956	Basel	Alice Fischer	Carine Borner	Elvira Schürr	
1957	Arosa	Alice Fischer	Rita Müller	Carine Borner	
1958	Zurich	Rita Müller	Liliane Crosa	Edith Fuchs	
1959	Lausanne	Liliane Crosa	Fränzi Schmidt	Edith Fuchs	
1960	Winterthur	Liliane Crosa	Fränzi Schmidt	Ann-Margreth Frei	
1961	Arosa	Fränzi Schmidt	Dorette Bek	Ann-Margreth Frei	
1962	Neuchâtel	Fränzi Schmidt	Dorette Bek	Gaby Kleiner	
1963	Zurich	Dorette Bek	Fränzi Schmidt	Monika Zingg	
1964	Winterthur	Fränzi Schmidt	Monika Zingg	Christiane Boillod	
1965	Geneva	Pia Zürcher	Cécile Rusch	Charlotte Walter	
1966	Lucerne	Pia Zürcher	Charlotte Walter	Cécile Rusch	
1967	Basel	Pia Zürcher	Charlotte Walter	Monika Torriani	
1968	Zurich	Charlotte Walter	Ingrid Seiterle	Evi Mäder	
1969	Lausanne	Charlotte Walter	Karin Iten	Eva Charles	
1970	Winterthur	Charlotte Walter	Ann-Claire Rüedi	Marlyse Eicher	
1971	St. Gallen	Charlotte Walter	Karin Iten	Donna Walter	
1972	Bern	Charlotte Walter	Donna Walter	Karin Iten	
1973	Basel	Karin Iten	Donna Walter	Danièle Dubuis	
1974	Geneva	Karin Iten	Kathy Brunner	Evelyn Reusser	
1975	Villars-sur-Ollon	Karin Iten	Evi Köpfli	Michelle Haider	
1976	Bern	Danielle Rieder	Evi Köpfli	Denise Biellmann	
1977	La Chaux-de-Fonds	Danielle Rieder	Denise Biellmann	Anita Siegfried	
1978	Herisau	Danielle Rieder	Denise Biellmann	Anita Siegfried	
1979	Aarau	Denise Biellmann	Corinne Wyrsch	Anita Siegfried	
1980	Bern	Denise Biellmann	Danielle Rieder	Myriam Oberwiler	
1981	Lausanne	Denise Biellmann	Corinne Wyrsch	Anita Siegfried	
1982	Zurich	Myriam Oberwiler	Sandra Cariboni	Manuela Tschupp	
1983	Arosa	Sandra Cariboni	Myriam Oberwiler	Mirella Grazia	
1984	Geneva	Myriam Oberwiler	Sandra Cariboni	Manuela Tschupp	
1985	Lausanne	Claudia Villiger	Sandra Cariboni	Manuela Tschupp	
1986	Porrentruy	Claudia Villiger	Manuela Tschupp	Sophie Estermann	
1987	Bern	Claudia Villiger	Stéfanie Schmid	Kathrin Schröter	
1988	Lucerne	Stéfanie Schmid	Petra von Moos	Mirjam Wehrli	
1989	Zurich	Stéfanie Schmid	Petra von Moos	Michèle Claret	
1990	Lausanne	Mirjam Wehrli	Michèle Claret	Stéfanie Schmid	
1991	Olten	Sabrina Tschudi	Nathalie Krieg	Stéfanie Schmid	
1992	Monthey	Nicole Skoda	Nathalie Krieg	Sabrina Tschudi	
1993	Bern	Nathalie Krieg	Nicole Skoda	Janine Bur	
1994	Neuchâtel	Nathalie Krieg	Janine Bur	Nicole Skoda	
1995	Davos	Janine Bur	Nathalie Krieg	Lucinda Ruh	
1996	Lugano	Lucinda Ruh	Janine Bur	Anina Fivian	
1997	Grindelwald	Anina Fivian	Lucinda Ruh	Roberta Piazzini	
1998	Schaffhausen	Anina Fivian	Lucinda Ruh	Christel Borghi	
1999	Lausanne	Christel Borghi	Sarah Meier	Anina Fivian	
2000	Lugano	Sarah Meier	Kimena Brog-Meier	Nicole Skoda	
2001	Geneva	Sarah Meier	Kimena Brog-Meier	Simone Walthard	
2002	Zurich	Kimena Brog-Meier	Viviane Käser	Roberta Piazzini	
2003	Zug	Sarah Meier	Kimena Brog-Meier	Corinne Djoungong	
2004	Neuchâtel	Cindy Carquillat (Note: Cindy Carquillat did not achieve the minimum required score to be named the Swiss champion.)	Lucie Anne Blazek	Myriam Flühmann	
2005	Lausanne	Sarah Meier	Kimena Brog-Meier	Cindy Carquillat	
2006	Biasca	Sarah Meier	Bettina Heim	Cindy Carquillat	
2007	Geneva	Sarah Meier	Bettina Heim	Myriam Leuenberger	
2008	Winterthur	Sarah Meier	Viviane Käser	Noémie Silberer	
2009	La Chaux-de-Fonds	Nicole Graf	Romy Bühler	Noémie Silberer	
2010	Lugano	Sarah Meier	Bettina Heim	Romy Bühler	
2011	Zug	Bettina Heim	Romy Bühler	Myriam Leuenberger	
2012	Basel	Romy Bühler	Myriam Leuenberger	Nicole Graf	
2013	Geneva	Tina Stürzinger	Anna Ovcharova	Nicole Graf	
2014	La Chaux-de-Fonds	Anna Ovcharova	Tanja Odermatt	Tina Stürzinger	
2015	Lugano	Eveline Brunner	Anna Ovcharova	Tanja Odermatt	
2016	Lausanne	Tanja Odermatt	Shaline Rüegger	Yasmine Yamada	
2017	Lucerne	Yasmine Yamada	Yoonmi Lehmann	Jérômie Repond	
2018	Neuchâtel	Alexia Paganini	Yoonmi Lehmann	Yasmine Yamada	
2019	Wetzikon	Alexia Paganini	Yasmine Yamada	Yoonmi Lehmann	
2020	Biel/Bienne	Alexia Paganini	Noémie Bodenstein	Yasmine Yamada	
2021	St. Moritz	Competition cancelled due to the COVID-19 pandemic			
2022	Lucerne	Alexia Paganini	Yasmine Yamada	Livia Kaiser	
2023	Chur	Livia Kaiser	Kimmy Repond	Sarina Joos	
2024	Küsnacht	Kimmy Repond	Carla Anthea Gradinaru	Livia Kaiser	
2025	Geneva	Kimmy Repond	Livia Kaiser	Ophélie Clerc	
2026	Lugano	Leandra Tzimpoukakis	Livia Kaiser	Anastasia Brandenburg	

=== Pairs ===
Senior pairs event medalists
Year	Location	Gold	Silver	Bronze	Ref.
1933	Engelberg	B. Streuli; Edwin Keller	Ruth Hauser; B. Persitz	Herta Schülling; Charles Rima	
1934	Bern	Ruth Hauser; Edwin Keller	Fräulein Kläsi; S. Steiger	Herta Schülling; Charles Rima	
1935	Basel	Fräulein Kläsi; S. Steiger	Herta Schilling; Charles Rima	Pierette Dubois; Paul Dubois	
1936	Arosa	Pierette Dubois; Paul Dubois	Herta Schilling; Charles Rima	Ruth Hauser; Edwin Keller	
1937	Davos	Pierette Dubois; Paul Dubois	Herta Schilling; Hans Beyeler	No other competitors	
1938	Bern	Pierette Dubois; Paul Dubois	Herta Schilling; Hans Beyeler	Mia Kaiser; Lucian Büeler	
1939	Arosa	Pierette Dubois; Paul Dubois	Mia Kaiser; Lucian Büeler	Ester Niethammer; Jakob Biedermann	
1940	Arosa	Pierette Dubois; Paul Dubois	Mia Kaiser; Lucian Büeler	Fräulein Jordan; Marcel Leimgruber	
1941	Glarus	Pierette Dubois; Paul Dubois	Fräulein Jordan; Marcel Leimgruber	Luny Unold; Hans Kuster	
1942	Arosa	Emilia Pancaldi; Hans Gabriel	Fräulein Jordan; Marcel Leimgruber	L. Bopp; E. Schneider	
1943	Lausanne	Pierette Dubois; Paul Dubois	Emilia Pancaldi; Hans Gabriel	Luny Unold; Hans Kuster	
1944	Davos	Pierette Dubois; Paul Dubois	Luny Unold; Hans Kuster	No other competitors	
1945	Zurich	Pierette Dubois; Paul Dubois	Luny Unold; Hans Kuster	No other competitors	
1946	Davos	Luny Unold; Hans Kuster	Lohni Schneider; Kurth Schneider	No other competitors	
1947	Arosa	Luny Unold; Hans Kuster	Eliane Steinemann; André Calame	Rovida Brown; Nigel Brown	
1948	Davos	Luny Unold; Hans Kuster	Eliane Steinemann; André Calame	Rovida Brown; Nigel Brown	
1949	Lausanne	Eliane Steinemann; André Calame	Ghislaine Köpf; François Pache	Rovida Brown; Nigel Brown	
1950	Basel	Eliane Steinemann; André Calame	Rovida Brown; Nigel Brown	Silvia Grandjean; Michel Grandjean	
1951	Klosters	Eliane Steinemann; André Calame	Silvia Grandjean; Michel Grandjean	Rovida Brown; Nigel Brown	
1952	Flims	Silvia Grandjean; Michel Grandjean	No other competitors		
1953	Arosa	Silvia Grandjean; Michel Grandjean	Susy Holstein; Willy Wahl	Rovida Brown; Nigel Brown	
1954	Villars-sur-Ollon	Silvia Grandjean; Michel Grandjean	Susy Holstein; Willy Wahl	Rovida Brown; Nigel Brown	
1955	Flims	Susy Holstein; Willy Wahl	Maja Hohl; Fritz Loosli	No other competitors	
1956	Basel	Susy Holstein; Willy Wahl	Maja Hohl; Fritz Loosli	No other competitors	
1957	Arosa	Gerda Johner; Rüdi Johner	No other competitors		
1958	Zurich	Gerda Johner; Rüdi Johner	No other competitors		
1959	Lausanne	Gerda Johner; Rüdi Johner	Rösli Eberli; Eugen Jost	No other competitors	
1960	Winterthur	Gerda Johner; Rüdi Johner	Erika Germann; Markus Germann	No other competitors	
1961	Arosa	Gerda Johner; Rüdi Johner	Erika Germann; Markus Germann	Ruth Frei; Gino Arnosti	
1962	Neuchâtel	Gerda Johner; Rüdi Johner	Jacqueline Steiner; Jean-Pierre Külling	Erika Germann; Markus Germann	
1963	Zurich	Gerda Johner; Rüdi Johner	Monique Mathis; Yves Aellig	No other competitors	
1964	Winterthur	Gerda Johner; Rüdi Johner	Monique Mathis; Yves Aellig	No other competitors	
1965	Geneva	Gerda Johner; Rüdi Johner	Monique Mathis; Yves Aellig	Mona Szabo; Peter Szabo	
1966	Lucerne	Monique Mathis; Yves Aellig	Mona Szabo; Peter Szabo	No other competitors	
1967	Basel	Mona Szabo; Peter Szabo	Monique Mathis; Yves Aellig	Edith Sperl; Heinz Wirz	
1968	Zurich	Mona Szabo; Peter Szabo	Karin Künzle; Christian Künzle	No other competitors	
1969	Lausanne	Edith Sperl; Heinz Wirz	Karin Künzle; Christian Künzle	Barbara Junker; Rolf Müller	
1970	Winterthur	Karin Künzle; Christian Künzle	Barbara Junker; Rolf Müller	No other competitors	
1971	St. Gallen	Karin Künzle; Christian Künzle	No other competitors		
1972	Bern	Karin Künzle; Christian Künzle	No other competitors		
1973	Basel	Karin Künzle; Christian Künzle	Andrea Meier; Roland Meier	No other competitors	
1974	Geneva	Karin Künzle; Christian Künzle	Andrea Meier; Roland Meier	No other competitors	
1975	Villars-sur-Ollon	Karin Künzle; Christian Künzle	Sibylle Dekumbis; Peter Dekumbis	No other competitors	
1976	Bern	Karin Künzle; Christian Künzle	No other competitors		
1977	La Chaux-de-Fonds	Chantal Zürcher; Paul Huber	No other competitors		
1978	Herisau	Gaby Galambos; Jörg Galambos	No other competitors		
1979	Aarau	Christine Eicher; Paul Huber	Gaby Galambos; Jörg Galambos	No other competitors	
1980	Bern	Danielle Rieder; Paul Huber	Gaby Galambos; Jörg Galambos	No other competitors	
1981	Lausanne	Gaby Galambos; Jörg Galambos	No other competitors		
1982	Zurich	Gaby Galambos; Jörg Galambos	No other competitors		
1983	Arosa	Gaby Galambos; Jörg Galambos; (Note: Gaby and Jörg Galambos did not achieve the minimum required score to be named the Swiss champions.)	No other competitors		
1984	Geneva	Gaby Galambos; Jörg Galambos	No other competitors		
1985–86	No pairs competitors				
1987	Bern	Saskia Bourgeois; Guy Bourgeois; (Note: Saskia and Guy Bourgeois did not achieve the minimum required score to be named the Swiss champions.)	No other competitors		
1988	Lucerne	Saskia Bourgeois; Guy Bourgeois	Leslie Monod; Cédric Monod	No other competitors	
1989	Zurich	Saskia Bourgeois; Guy Bourgeois	Leslie Monod; Cédric Monod	No other competitors	
1990	Lausanne	Saskia Bourgeois; Guy Bourgeois	Leslie Monod; Cédric Monod	No other competitors	
1991	Olten	Saskia Bourgeois; Guy Bourgeois	No other competitors		
1992	Monthey	Leslie Monod; Cédric Monod	No other competitors		
1993	Bern	Leslie Monod; Cédric Monod	No other competitors		
1994	Neuchâtel	Leslie Monod; Cédric Monod	No other competitors		
1995–2007	No pairs competitors				
2008	Winterthur	Anaïs Morand; Antoine Dorsaz	No other competitors		
2009	La Chaux-de-Fonds	Anaïs Morand; Antoine Dorsaz	No other competitors		
2010	Lugano	Anaïs Morand; Antoine Dorsaz	No other competitors		
2011	Zug	Anaïs Morand; Timothy Leemann	No other competitors		
2012	Basel	Anaïs Morand; Timothy Leemann	No other competitors		
2013	Geneva	No pairs competitors			
2014	La Chaux-de-Fonds	Méline Habechian; Noah Scherer	Alexandra Herbríková; Nicolas Roulet	No other competitors	
2015	Lugano	Alexandra Herbríková; Nicolas Roulet	No other competitors		
2016	Lausanne	Alexandra Herbríková; Nicolas Roulet	Ioulia Chtchetinina; Noah Scherer	No other competitors	
2017	Lucerne	Ioulia Chtchetinina; Noah Scherer	Alexandra Herbríková; Nicolas Roulet	No other competitors	
2018	Neuchâtel	Ioulia Chtchetinina; Mikhail Akulov	No other competitors		
2019	Wetzikon	Alexandra Herbríková; Nicolas Roulet	No other competitors		
2020	Biel/Bienne	Alexandra Herbríková; Nicolas Roulet	No other competitors		
2021	St. Moritz	Competition cancelled due to the COVID-19 pandemic			
2022	Lucerne	Jessica Pfund; Joshua Santillan	No other competitors		
2023	Chur	No pairs competitors			
2024	Küsnacht	Pauline Irman; Benjamin Jalovick	No other competitors		
2025	Geneva	Oxana Vouillamoz; Tom Bouvart	No other competitors		
2026	Lugano	Oxana Vouillamoz; Tom Bouvart	No other competitors		

=== Ice dance ===
Senior ice dance event medalists
Year	Location	Gold	Silver	Bronze	Ref.
1960	Bern	Mary van Urk; Jürg Wilhelm	Marlyse Fornachon; Charles Pichard	No other competitors	
1961	Lucerne	Marlyse Fornachon; Charles Pichard	Rosemarie Lerf; Heinrich Kern	Denise Bornoz; Pierre Bornoz	
1962	Villars-sur-Ollon	Marlyse Fornachon; Charles Pichard	Rosemarie Lerf; Heinrich Kern	Susi Degen; Willy Wahl	
1963	Flims	Marlyse Fornachon; Charles Pichard	No other competitors		
1964	Davos	No ice dance competitors			
1965	Geneva	Elisabeth Schatz; Michel Lechaire	Micheline Guignard; Gilbert Guignard	Mary-Anne Besse; Daniel Besse	
1966	Lucerne	Rosmarie Lerf; Roland Wehinger	No other competitors		
1967	Basel	No ice dance competitors			
1968	Zurich	Margrit Roggwiller; Eugen Jost	Christiane Dallenbach; Leo Barbelon	Silvia Bodmer; Beat Streib	
1969	Lausanne	Christiane Dallenbach; Leo Barblan	Silvia Bodmer; Beat Steib	No other competitors	
1970	Winterthur	Tatjana Grossen; Alexander Grossen	Christiane Dallenbach; Leo Barblan	Silvia Bodmer; Beat Steib	
1971	St. Gallen	Tatjana Grossen; Alexander Grossen	Silvia Bodmer; Beat Steib	Käthi Zbinden; Leo Barblan	
1972	Bern	Silvia Bodmer; Beat Steib	Käthi Zbinden; Leo Barblan	Gerda Bühler; Mathis Bächi	
1973	Basel	Gerda Bühler; Mathis Bächi	Silvia Bodmer; Beat Steib	Käthi Zbinden; Leo Barblan	
1974	Geneva	Gerda Bühler; Mathis Bächi	Käthi Zbinden; Leo Barblan	Nicole Blanc; Jean-Philippe Favre-Bulle	
1975	Villars-sur-Ollon	Gerda Bühler; Maxime Erlanger	Nicole Favre-Bulle; Jean-Philipe Favre-Bulle	Käthi Zbinden; Lionel Focking	
1976	Bern	Gerda Bühler; Maxime Erlanger	Sylvette Pahud; Jean-Michel Pahud	No other competitors	
1977	La Chaux-de-Fonds	Regula Lattmann; Hanspeter Müller	Marianne Zingg; Urs Zingg	Esther Giuglia; Attila Pauli	
1978	Herisau	Regula Lattmann; Hanspeter Müller	Claudia Schmidlin; Daniel Schmidlin	Esther Giuglia; Attila Pauli	
1979	Aarau	Regula Lattmann; Hanspeter Müller	Claudia Schmidlin; Daniel Schmidlin	Erika Binz; Adrian Schmidlin	
1980	Bern	Regula Lattmann; Hanspeter Müller	Esther Giuglia; Roland Mäder	Béatrice Herzig; Attila Pauli	
1981	Lausanne	Regula Lattmann; Hanspeter Müller	Esther Giuglia; Roland Mäder	Graziella Ferpozzi; Marco Ferpozzi	
1982	Zurich	Graziella Ferpozzi; Marco Ferpozzi	Esther Giuglia; Roland Mäder	Salome Brunner; Markus Merz	
1983	Arosa	Graziella Ferpozzi; Marco Ferpozzi	Claudia Schmidlin; Daniel Schmidlin	Salome Brunner; Markus Merz	
1984	Geneva	Graziella Ferpozzi; Marco Ferpozzi	Salome Brunner; Markus Merz	Claudia Schmidlin; Daniel Schmidlin	
1985	Lausanne	Gaby Schuppli; Markus Merz	Beatrice Herzig; Roland Mäder	Dietlind Gerloff; Claude Hamori	
1986	Porrentruy	Claudia Schmidlin; Daniel Schmidlin	Dietlind Gerloff; Claude Hamori	No other competitors	
1987	Bern	Desirée Schlegel; Patrik Brecht	Dietlind Gerloff; Claude Hamori	Danielle Märk; Markus Merz	
1988	Lucerne	Desirée Schlegel; Patrik Brecht	Danielle Märk; Markus Merz	Dietlind Gerloff; Claude Hamori	
1989	Zurich	Diane Gerencser; Bernard Columberg	Desirée Schlegel; Patrik Brecht	Danielle Märk; Markus Merz	
1990	Lausanne	Diane Gerencser; Bernard Columberg	Anne-Catherine Conscience; Christoph Baumann	No other competitors	
1991	Olten	Diane Gerencser; Bernard Columberg	Yvette Rauber; Patrik Brecht	No other competitors	
1992	Monthey	Valérie Le Tensorer; Jörg Kienzle	Zuzana Merz; Markus Merz	Yvette Rauber; Patrick Brecht	
1993	Bern	Diane Gerencser; Alexander Stanislavov	Anne-Catherine Conscience; Roger Conscience	No other competitors	
1994	Neuchâtel	Diane Gerencser; Alexander Stanislavov	Anne-Catherine Conscience; Roger Conscience	No other competitors	
1995	Davos	Diane Gerencser; Alexander Stanislavov	Irma Siradovic; Alexei Pospelov	Laurie-Agnes Pécoud; Fabrice Pécoud	
1996	Lugano	Cornelia Diener; Alexej Pospelov	Laurie-Agnes Pécoud; Fabrice Pécoud	Andréa Wyss; Marc Schneider	
1997	Grindelwald	Andréa Wyss; Marc Schneider; (Note: Andréa Wyss and Marc Schneider did not achieve the minimum required score to be named the Swiss champions.)	No other competitors		
1998	Schaffhausen	Eliane Hugentobler; Daniel Hugentobler	No other competitors		
1999	Lausanne	Eliane Hugentobler; Daniel Hugentobler	No other competitors		
2000	Lugano	Eliane Hugentobler; Daniel Hugentobler	No other competitors		
2001	Geneva	Eliane Hugentobler; Daniel Hugentobler	No other competitors		
2002	Zurich	Eliane Hugentobler; Daniel Hugentobler	No other competitors		
2003–04	No ice dance competitors				
2005	Lausanne	Daniela Keller; Fabian Keller	Christel Savioz; Jean-Philippe Mathieu	Leonie Krail; Oscar Peter	
2006	Biasca	Leonie Krail; Oscar Peter	Christel Savioz; Jean-Philippe Mathieu	No other competitors	
2007	Geneva	Nora von Bergen; David DeFazio	Christel Savioz; Jean-Philippe Mathieu	Leonie Krail; Oscar Peter	
2008	Winterthur	Leonie Krail; Oscar Peter	Christel Savioz; Jean-Philippe Mathieu	No other competitors	
2009	La Chaux-de-Fonds	Leonie Krail; Oscar Peter	No other competitors		
2010	Lugano	Ramona Elsener; Florian Roost	Leonie Krail; Oscar Peter	No other competitors	
2011	Zug	Ramona Elsener; Florian Roost	No other competitors		
2012	Basel	Ramona Elsener; Florian Roost	No other competitors		
2013	Geneva	Ramona Elsener; Florian Roost	No other competitors		
2014	La Chaux-de-Fonds	Ramona Elsener; Florian Roost	Katarina Paice; Andrea Morrone	No other competitors	
2015	Lugano	Sandrine-Tabea Hofstetter; Jérémie Flemin	Katarina Paice; Yuri Yeremenko	No other competitors	
2016	Lausanne	Katarina Paice; Yuri Yeremenko	No other competitors		
2017	Lucerne	Victoria Manni; Carlo Röthlisberger	Bailey Melton; Darian Weiss	No other competitors	
2018	Neuchâtel	Victoria Manni; Carlo Röthlisberger	No other competitors		
2019	Wetzikon	Victoria Manni; Carlo Röthlisberger	Arianna Wróblewska; Stéphane Walker	No other competitors	
2020	Biel/Bienne	Victoria Manni; Carlo Röthlisberger	Arianna Wróblewska; Stéphane Walker	No other competitors	
2021	St. Moritz	Competition cancelled due to the COVID-19 pandemic			
2022	Lucerne	Jasmine Tessari; Stéphane Walker	Fiona Pernas; German Shamraev	Arianna Sassi; Luca Morini	
2023	Chur	Arianna Sassi; Luca Morini	No other competitors		
2024	Küsnacht	Arianna Sassi; Luca Morini	Kayleigh Ella Maksymec; Félix Desmarais	Nicole Calderari; Cristian Murer	
2025	Geneva	Gina Zehnder; Beda Leon Sieber	Arianna Sassi; Luca Morini	No other competitors	
2026	Lugano	Gina Zehnder; Beda Leon Sieber	Arianna Sassi; Luca Morini	No other competitors	

== Junior medalists ==
=== Men's singles ===
Junior men's event medalists
Year	Location	Gold	Silver	Bronze	Ref.
1993	Neuchâtel	Thomas Schätzle	Stephan Beer	No other competitors	
1994	Zurich	Andreas von Arb	Stephan Beer	Frédéric Fetzer	
1995	Zurich	Andreas von Arb	Thomas Schätzle	Jörg Kling	
1996	Zurich	Oscar Peter	Thomas Schätzle	Salvatore Corbisiero	
1997	Uzwil	Salvatore Corbisiero	Jörg Kling	No other competitors	
1998	Lugano	Salvatore Corbisiero	Patrick Addeo	No other competitors	
1999	Lausanne	Stéphane Lambiel	No other competitors		
2000	Lugano	Jamal Othman	Raphaël Bohren	André Kilchenmann	
2001	Geneva	Jamal Othman	Erland Moecki	Gian Rageth	
2002	Zurich	Gian Rageth	Daniel Widmer	Moris Pfeifhofer	
2003	Zug	Moris Pfeifhofer	Marco Walker	Clemens Brummer	
2004	Neuchâtel	Marco Walker	Daniel Widmer	Christopher Coleman	
2005	Lausanne	Laurent Alvarez	Daniel Widmer	Dat Nguyen	
2006	Lucerne	Stéphane Walker	Nicolas Dubois	Dat Nguyen	
2007	La Chaux-de-Fonds	Tomi Pulkkinen	Nicolas Dubois	Timothy Leemann	
2008	Biasca	Tomi Pulkkinen	Timothy Leemann	Joos Kündig	
2010	Lausanne	Sergey Balashov	Ioan Perret	Carlo Röthlisberger	
2013	Biasca	Vincent Cuérel	Tim Huber	Loïc Dubois	
2014	Thônex	Tim Huber	Nurullah Sahaka	Ambros Grünenfelder	
2015	Winterthur	Nurullah Sahaka	Lukas Britschgi	Beat Schümperli	
2016	Biasca	Lukas Britschgi	Tim Huber	Micha Steffen	
2017	Lugano	Noah Bodenstein	Tomàs Guarino Sabaté	David Gouveia	
2018	Morges	Noah Bodenstein	Artemiy Kositsyn	David Gouveia	
2019	La Chaux-de-Fonds	Noah Bodenstein	David Gouveia	Artemiy Kositsyn	
2020	Monthey	Noah Bodenstein	Matvey Ivanou	Leon Auspurg	
2021	St. Moritz	Competition cancelled due to the COVID-19 pandemic			
2022	Bulle	Naoki Rossi	Georgii Pavlov	Aurel Chiper	
2023	Dübendorf	Aurélian Chervet	Georgii Pavlov	Taigo Thomas Sakai	
2024	Küsnacht	Aurélian Chervet	Ean Weiler	Damien Eckstein	
2025	Geneva	Ean Weiler	Sandro De Angelo	Tammaro Wyss	
2026	Lugano	Gion Schmid	Sandro De Angelo	No other competitors	

=== Women's singles ===
Junior women's event medalists
Year	Location	Gold	Silver	Bronze	Ref.
1993	Neuchâtel	Lucinda Ruh	Catherine Chammartin	Monika Leopold	
1994	Zurich	Christel Borghi	Monika Leopold	Tanja Bertschi	
1995	Zurich	Claudia Tschudi	Berrack Destanli	Tanja Bertschi	
1996	Zurich	Simone Walthard	Celyne Stoudmann	Berrak Destanli	
1997	Uzwil	Tania Hauser	Nicole Meier	Christine Gossewisch	
1998	Lugano	Cristina Bassi	Christina Gossewisch	Caroline Domb	
1999	Lausanne	Kimena Brog-Meier	Jennifer Schmid	Lucie-Anne Blazek	
2000	Lugano	Lucie-Anne Blazek	Cornelia Rast	Melanie Janice Bernhard	
2001	Geneva	Viviane Käser	Cécile Grometto	Myriam Leuenberger	
2002	Zurich	Simone Frunz	Cindy Carquillat	Myriam Flühmann	
2003	Zug	Sarah Aepli	Bettina Heim	Sarah Auberson	
2004	Neuchâtel	Bettina Heim	Caroline Zadory	Sandra Germann	
2005	Lausanne	Noémie Silberer	Aurelie Buchs	Diana Pedretti	
2006	Lucerne	Martina Pfirter	Corinne Kuerschner	Melanie Egelhofer	
2007	La Chaux-de-Fonds	Sylvie Hauert	Talika Gerber	Angela Koch	
2008	Biasca	Romy Bühler	Virginie Clerc	Sidonie Rohrer	
2010	Lausanne	Alisson Perticheto	Déborah Pisa	Tina Stuerzinger	
2013	Biasca	Giulia Isceri	Fanny Dietschi	Alba Fonjallaz	
2014	Thônex	Matilde Gianocca	Shaline Rüegger	Elena Oberholzer	
2015	Winterthur	Jérômie Repond	Andrea Anliker	Zora Largo	
2016	Biasca	Camille Chervet	Tina Leuenberger	Yoonmi Lehmann	
2017	Lugano	Noémie Bodenstein	Oksana Artyomenko	Federica Magnifico	
2018	Morges	Maïa Mazzara	Giulia Cello	Anaïs Coraducci	
2019	La Chaux-de-Fonds	Nicole Zaika	Anna La Porta	Pauline Imam	
2020	Monthey	Kimmy Repond	Anna La Porta	Sarina Joos	
2021	St. Moritz	Competition cancelled due to the COVID-19 pandemic			
2022	Bulle	Kimmy Repond	Sarina Joos	Ophélie Clerc	
2023	Dübendorf	Carla Anthea Gradinaru	Sophie Joline von Felten	Leandra Tzimpoukakis	
2024	Küsnacht	Leandra Tzimpoukakis	Anastasia Brandenburg	Leandra Tzimpoukakis	
2025	Geneva	Leandra Tzimpoukakis	Anastasia Brandenburg	Elisabeth Dibbern	
2026	Lugano	Valeriya Ezhova	Elisabeth Dibbern	Eugenia Sekulovski	

=== Pairs ===
Junior pairs event medalists
Year	Location	Gold	Silver	Bronze	Ref.
1993–2006	No junior pairs competitors				
2007	Geneva	Anaïs Morand; Antoine Dorsaz	No other competitors		
2008–12	No junior pairs competitors				
2013	Geneva	Camille Heinkle; Nicolas Roulet	No other competitors		
2014–23	No junior pairs competitors				
2024	Küsnacht	Chiara Michaela Pazienza; Maxim Knorr	No other competitors		
2025	Geneva	Chiara Michaela Pazienza; Maxim Knorr	Zoë Pflaum; Linus Mager	No other competitors	
2026	Lugano	Laura Gauch; Linus Mager	No other competitors		

=== Ice dance ===
Junior ice dance event medalists
Year	Location	Gold	Silver	Bronze	Ref.
1993	Neuchâtel	Cornelia Deiner; Thomas Deiner	Florence Petit; Laurie Maier	Laurie Pecoud; Fabric Pecoud	
1994	Zurich	Eliane Hugentobler; Daniel Hugentobler	Andréa Wyss; Marc Schneider	No other competitors	
1995	Zurich	Eliane Hugentobler; Daniel Hugentobler	Caroline Leuthold; Alexander Sessekine	Andréa Wyss; Marc Schneider	
1996	Zurich	Eliane Hugentobler; Daniel Hugentobler	Soskia Bösch; Martin Knöpfel	No other competitors	
1997	Uzwil	No junior ice dance competitors			
1998	Schaffhausen	Viviane Steiner; Flavio Steiner	No other competitors		
1999	Lausanne	No junior ice dance competitors			
2000	Lugano	Daniela Keller; Fabian Keller	No other competitors		
2001	Geneva	Daniela Keller; Fabian Keller	No other competitors		
2002	Zurich	Daniela Keller; Fabian Keller	Sara-Lena Weber; Sven Lang	No other competitors	
2003	Zug	No junior ice dance competitors			
2004	Neuchâtel	Daniela Keller; Fabian Keller	Nora von Bergen; Boris Räber	Livia Wetzel; Gerrit Knobloch	
2005	Lausanne	Nora von Bergen; Boris Räber	Livia Wetzel; Gerrit Knobloch	No other competitors	
2006	La Chaux-de-Fonds	Nora von Bergen; Boris Räber	Solène Pasztory; Andrew McCrary	No other competitors	
2007	Geneva	Ramona Elsener; Florian Roost	Solène Pasztory; Andrew McCrary	No other competitors	
2008	Winterthur	Ramona Elsener; Florian Roost	No other competitors		
2009	La Chaux-de-Fonds	Ramona Elsener; Florian Roost	Victoria Bausback; Seelik Mutti	No other competitors	
2010	Lugano	No junior ice dance competitors			
2011	Zug	Victoria Bausback; Demid Rokachev	No other competitors		
2012	Basel	Victoria Bausback; Demid Rokachev	No other competitors		
2013–14	No junior ice dance competitors				
2015	Lugano	Valentina Schär; Carlo Röthlisberger	No other competitors		
2016	Lausanne	Valentina Schär; Carlo Röthlisberger	Marie-Louise Leupold; Christof Steger	No other competitors	
2017	Lucerne	Marie-Louise Leupold; Christof Steger	Cindy-Lilli Zimmerli; Volodymyr Nakisko	No other competitors	
2018	Neuchâtel	Cindy-Lilli Zimmerli; Volodymyr Nakisko	No other competitors		
2019	Wetzikon	No junior ice dance competitors			
2020	Biel/Bienne	Gina Zehnder; Beda Leon Sieber	Alina Klein; Maxim Kobelt	Fiona Pernas; Cyrille Vandestoke	
2021	St. Moritz	Competition cancelled due to the COVID-19 pandemic			
2022	Lucerne	Gina Zehnder; Beda Leon Sieber	Kayleigh Ella Maksymec; Maximilien Rahier	Elina Bacsa; Cristian Murer	
2023	Chur	Milla O'Brien; Laurin Wiederkehr	Gina Zehnder; Beda Leon Sieber	Maëlle Ledermann; Antonin Emo	
2024	Küsnacht	Gina Zehnder; Beda Leon Sieber	Seraina Tscharner; Laurin Wiederkehr	Éléonore Gabet; Maxime Evéquoz	
2025	Geneva	Seraina Tscharner; Laurin Wiederkehr	Alexandra Lévy; Alan Llorente	No other competitors	
2026	Lugano	Seraina Tscharner; Laurin Wiederkehr	Leonie Woodtli; Timon Suhner	No other competitors	

== Records ==
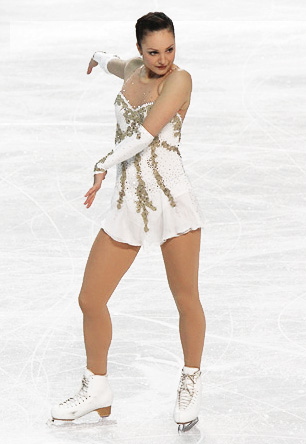
Sarah Meier won a record eight Swiss Championship titles in women's singles.

Records
Discipline	Most championship titles			
Discipline	Skater(s)	No.	Years	Ref.
Men's singles	Oliver Höner	11	1979–80; 1982; 1984–91	
Women's singles	Sarah Meier	8	2000–01; 2003; 2005–08; 2010	
Pairs	Pierette Dubois; Paul Dubois	9	1936–41; 1943–45	
Pairs	Gerda Johner; Rüdi Johner	9	1957–65	
Ice dance	Diane Gerencser; (Note: Diane Gerencser won three championship titles while partnered with Bernard Columberg (1989–91), and three with Alexander Stanislavov (1993–95).)	6	1989–91; 1993–95	
