= Honer =

Honer or Höner is the surname of:

- Daniel Höner (born 1953), Swiss former figure skater, national champion from 1967 to 1973
- Dean Honer, half of the English electronic music duo I Monster
- Manfred Höner (fl. 1987–1991), German former football coach
- Marvin Höner (born 1994), German footballer
- Oliver Höner (born 1966), Swiss figure skating coach and former skater
- Honer (Godalming cricketer) (fl. 1820s), English cricketer (first name unknown)

== See also ==
- Honer Plaza, one of the first shopping centers in Orange County, California, United States
- Hœnir, a god in Norse mythology
- Honour
