= Viviane Käser =

Swiss figure skater

Personal information
- Born: 10 May 1985 (age 41) Aarau, Aargau, Switzerland
- Height: 1.63 m (5 ft 4 in)

Figure skating career
- Country: Switzerland
- Coach: Daniel Höner, Oliver Höner
- Skating club: Eissport-Club Zürich-Oerlikon
- Began skating: 1991
- Retired: 2010

Medal record
Swiss Championships
Silver medal – second place	2002 Zurich	Singles
Silver medal – second place	2008 Winterthur	Singles

Viviane Käser (born 10 May 1985) is a Swiss former competitive figure skater. She is the 2007 International Challenge Cup bronze medalist and a two-time Swiss national silver medalist (2002, 2008). She qualified to the free skate at the 2008 European Championships and finished 23rd.

== Programs ==
Season	Short program	Free skating
2007–2008	Ghost Love Score (from End of an Era) by Nightwish	Harry Potter and the Order of the Phoenix by Nicholas Hooper; Wanja the Wanderer by Andreas Vollenweider; Harry Potter and the Order of the Phoenix by Nicholas Hooper
2003–2004	Birdman; Art on Ice by Edvin Marton	Chicago by Kander and Ebb; Kissing a Fool by Joseph Vitarelli, George Michael; Overture from The Full Monty by Anne Dudley
2001–2002	Tango by Carlos Sauras	Charlie Chaplin film music by Francis Shaw
2000–2001	South American rhythms	Music by Ludwig van Beethoven

== Competitive highlights ==
JGP: Junior Grand Prix

International
Event	99–00	00–01	01–02	02–03	03–04	04–05	05–06	06–07	07–08	08–09	09–10
Worlds									40th		
Europeans									23rd		
Challenge Cup								3rd		11th	
Cup of Nice										8th	24th
Finlandia										13th	
Golden Spin						18th					
Merano Cup								8th	9th		
International: Junior
Junior Worlds		29th		29th							
JGP Bulgaria			14th								
JGP USA				10th							
EYOF				6th							
National
Swiss Champ.	6th J	1st J	2nd	4th	6th	5th	10th	7th	2nd	7th	7th
J = Junior level
