= Luny =

Luny may refer to:

- Luny, from Luny Tunes
- Luny Unold (1920–2010), Swiss figure skater
- Thomas Luny (1759–1837), English artist and painter
