= Alice Fischer (figure skater) =

Swiss figure skater and sprinter

Alice Fischer (20 July 1932 – 31 August 2017) was a Swiss figure skater and athlete. She competed in ladies‘ singles in figure skating and later represented Switzerland in athletics as a sprinter.

Fischer won the gold medal at the Swiss Figure Skating Championships in 1956 and 1957 and finished 18th at the 1956 Winter Olympics in Cortina d’Ampezzo. She had the following placements at major international championships - Women: 1955 World Championships (17th); 1956 World Championships (19th); 1957 World Championships (20th); 1954 European Championships (17th); 1955 European Championships (11th); 1956 European Championships (12th).

In addition to figure skating, Fischer was active in athletics as a sprinter. Between 1958 and 1964, she won 11 Swiss national individual gold medals as a sprinter and 8 gold medals in the 4 × 100 m relay. She also represented Switzerland at the European Athletics Championships in Stockholm in 1958 in the 100 metres, 200 metres and 4x100 metres relay.

== Personal life ==
Fischer was married and had two children. Her sister Georgette Buehlmann-Fischer won the gold medal at the Swiss Figure Skating Championships in 1954 and 1955.
