= Bettina Heim =

Swiss figure skater (born 1989)

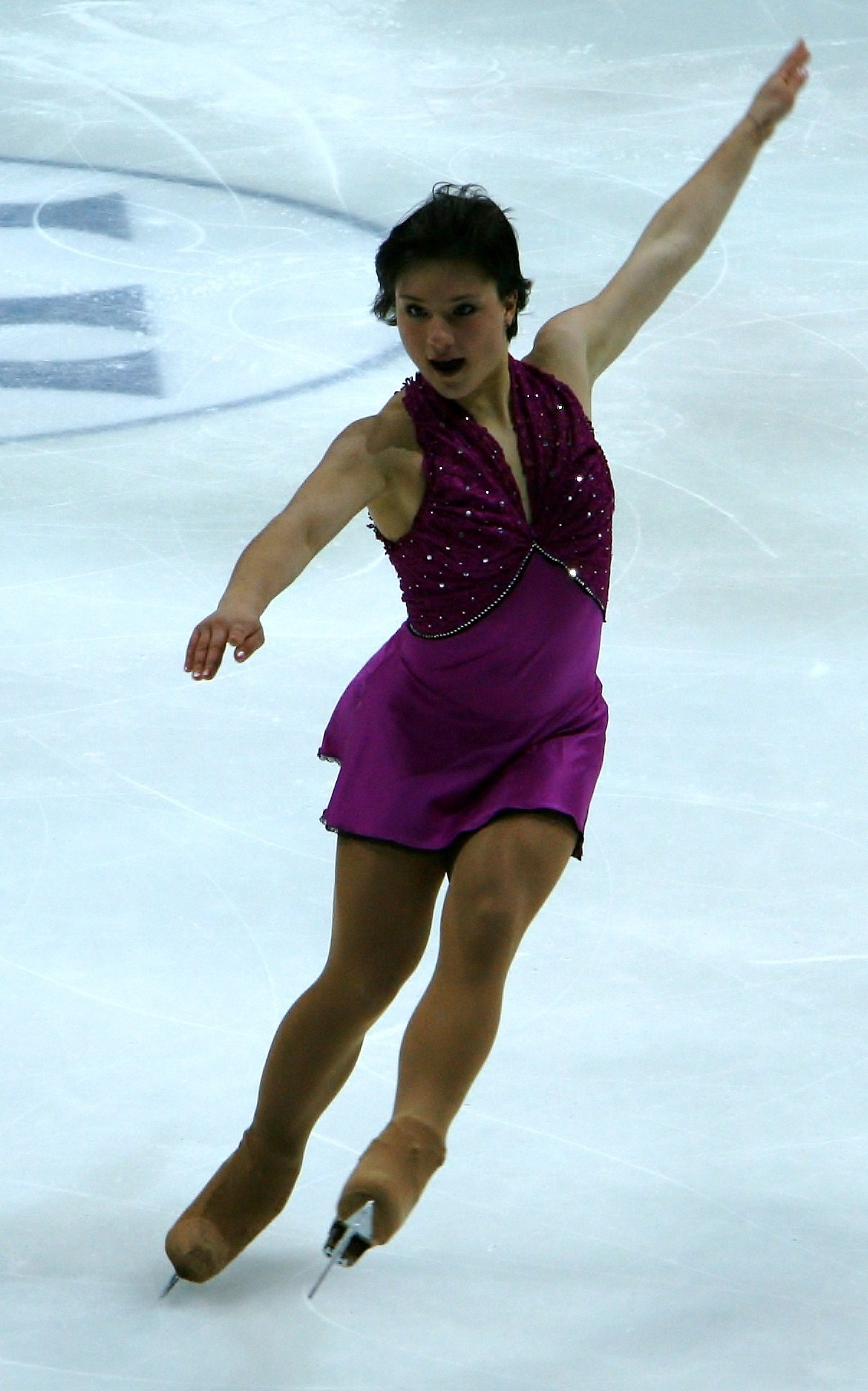
- Heim at the 2011 World Championships

Personal information
- Born: 2 July 1989 (age 37) Herisau, Switzerland
- Height: 1.55 m (5 ft 1 in)

Figure skating career
- Country: Switzerland
- Skating club: Winterthurer SC
- Began skating: 1992
- Retired: 2011

Medal record
Swiss Championships
Gold medal – first place	2011 Zug	Singles
Silver medal – second place	2006 Biasca	Singles
Silver medal – second place	2007 Geneva	Singles
Silver medal – second place	2010 Lugano	Singles

Bettina Heim (born 2 July 1989) is a former Swiss competitive figure skater who now works on the CUDA-Q team at Nvidia after spending several years leading the language design team for Microsoft's Q# programming language.

== Figure skating career ==
She was the 2011 Swiss national champion, and competed at two World Junior Championships and two World Championships.

== Programs ==
Season	Short program	Free skating
2010–2011	Faraway performed by Apocalyptica	Brandenburg; Fanfare by Black Violin
2007–2008	Le Voyage de l'Empereur	In un'altra vita

== Competitive highlights ==
International
Event	2003–04	2004–05	2005–06	2006–07	2007–08	2008–09	2009–10	2010–11
World Champ.						32nd		27th
European Champ.					28th			
Crystal Skate								4th
Merano Cup							15th	4th
Mont Blanc							8th	
Nebelhorn						17th		
Ondrej Nepela								9th
Triglav Trophy							14th	
International: Junior
Junior Worlds			24th	19th				
JGP Andorra			10th					
JGP Croatia	20th		17th					
JGP Czech Rep.				13th				
JGP Estonia					15th			
JGP Hungary		15th						
JGP Romania		16th		6th				
JGP U.K.					16th			
EYOF		11th J.						
Gardena	11th J.							
National
Swiss Champ.	1st J.	4th	2nd	2nd	4th	10th	2nd	1st
JGP = Junior Grand Prix; J. = Junior level

== Quantum physics and Q# ==
Heim completed her master's degree in quantum physics at ETH Zurich, advised by Matthias Troyer. She now works on the CUDA-Q as a software engineering manager after spending several years leading the Q# language development effort for Microsoft.
