= Florian Roost =

Swiss former ice dancer (born 1989)

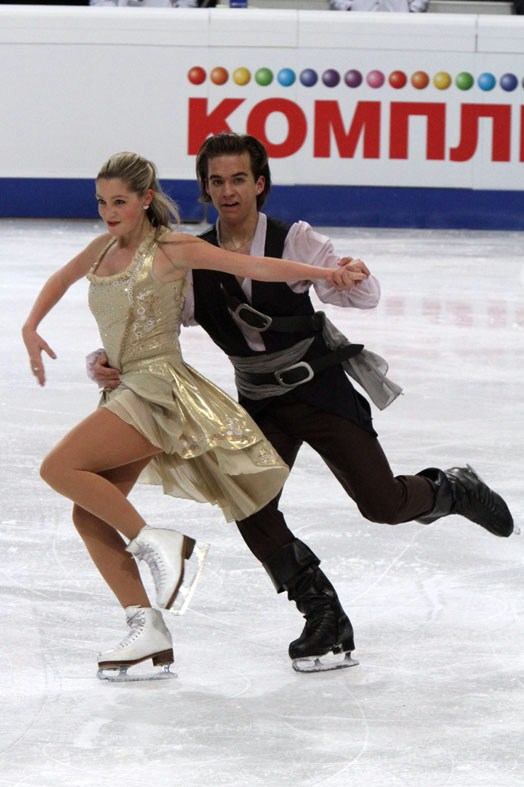
- Elsener and Roost in 2011

Personal information
- Born: 30 October 1989 (age 36) Frauenfeld, Switzerland
- Height: 1.74 m (5 ft 9 in)

Figure skating career
- Country: Switzerland
- Skating club: ES Frauenfeld
- Began skating: 1992
- Retired: May 2014

Medal record
Swiss Championships
Gold medal – first place	2010 Lugano	Ice dance
Gold medal – first place	2011 Zug	Ice dance
Gold medal – first place	2012 Basel	Ice dance
Gold medal – first place	2013 Geneva	Ice dance
Gold medal – first place	2014 La Chaux-de-Fonds	Ice dance

Florian Roost (born 30 October 1989) is a Swiss former ice dancer. With Ramona Elsener, he is the 2010–2014 Swiss national champion.

Elsener/Roost teamed up in 2005. They began appearing in international junior events in 2007. They were sent to five World Junior Championships and achieved their best result, 14th, in 2011. They also competed at five European Championships and three World Championships. In May 2014, Roost decided to retire from competition.

== Programs ==
(with Elsener)

Season	Short dance	Free dance
2013–2014	Quickstep: I'm Sitting on Top of the World; Foxtrot: Call Me Irresponsible	Roxanne by Sting and Marianito Mores; Oblivion for Piano Trio by Astor Piazzolla; El Tango de Roxanne (from Moulin Rouge!)
2012–2013	Polka: Pie in the Face Polka; Waltz: Carnival de Venice medley	Autant en emporte le vent by Gérard Presgurvic
2011–2012	Rhumba: Ramona la Bailadora; Samba: Maria by Ricky Martin	Michael Meets Mozart; Love Story meets Viva la Vida by Jon Schmidt
2010–2011	Waltz: Violente Valse by Caravan Palace	Pirates of the Caribbean: Drink Up, Me Hearties by Hans Zimmer; Fog Bound; The Black Pearl; He's a Pirate by Klaus Badelt
	Original dance	
2009–2010	Swiss folk dance: Alphorn Jodel; Tour de Suisse; Sumpfbode Ländler	Le Port d'Amsterdam by Jacques Brel
2008–2009	US Army in the 40s by The Star Sisters	Angel and Devil by Maxime Rodriguez
2007–2008	Swiss folk	Phantom of the Opera by Andrew Lloyd Webber
2006–2007	El Tango de Roxanne (from Moulin Rouge!)	Roméo et Juliette by Gérard Presgurvic

== Competitive highlights ==
(with Elsener)

International
Event	06–07	07–08	08–09	09–10	10–11	11–12	12–13	13–14
Worlds					25th	30th		25th
Europeans				25th	19th	22nd	18th	22nd
Bavarian Open					5th	5th	9th	6th
Cup of Nice						10th	10th	6th
Finlandia Trophy							6th	8th
Ice Challenge					10th	8th	3rd	6th
Mont Blanc Trophy				12th				
Nebelhorn Trophy							8th	14th
Pavel Roman						4th		
Skate Down Under								2nd
Trophy of Lyon						5th		
Volvo Open Cup								7th
International: Junior
Junior Worlds	21st	27th	28th	27th	14th			
JGP Austria		15th			7th			
JGP Germany		11th		16th	13th			
JGP USA				12th				
Ice Challenge				3rd				
National
Swiss Champ.	1st J	1st J	1st J	1st	1st	1st	1st	1st
