= Hubert Köpfler =

Swiss figure skater

Personal information
- Full name: Hubert Köpfler
- Born: 15 September 1935 (age 90)

Figure skating career
- Country: Switzerland

Hubert Köpfler (born 15 September 1935) is a Swiss figure skater. He is a five time (1953, 1957, 1959–1961) Swiss national champion. He represented Switzerland at the 1960 Winter Olympics where he placed 11th.

== Competitive highlights ==
Event	1953	1955	1957	1958	1959	1960	1961
Winter Olympic Games						11th	
World Championships	12th		12th		13th	13th	
European Championships	5th				9th	11th	
Swiss Championships	1st	3rd	1st		1st	1st	1st
