= Lucinda Ruh =

Swiss figure skater

Personal information
- Born: Lucinda Martha Ruh; 13 July 1979 (age 47) Zürich, Switzerland
- Height: 5 ft 9 in (175 cm)

Figure skating career
- Country: Switzerland
- Skating club: Club des Patineurs de Geneve
- Began skating: 1984
- Retired: 2000

Lucinda Martha Ruh (born 13 July 1979) is a Swiss former competitive figure skater. She is the 1996 Swiss national champion and the 1993 junior level national champion.

She is known for her outstanding spinning ability and her balletic skating. Nicknamed "the Queen of Spin", she is the longest and fastest spinner in the world ever. In April 2003, Ruh set a Guinness world record for the most continuous upright spins on ice (105). She toured with Stars on Ice, Champions on Ice, and numerous other worldwide tours. She also authored her 2011 memoir Frozen Teardrop.

== Personal life ==
Lucinda Martha Ruh was born on 13 July 1979 in Zürich, Switzerland. Her family moved to Paris, France, not long after her birth and then to Tokyo, Japan, when she was four years old. She was initially more focused on ballet than skating and at age seven received a scholarship to the Royal Ballet of London. She also practiced the piano and cello.

Ruh lives in New York City. In May 2012, she gave birth to twin girls, Angelica and Angelina.

== Career ==
Ruh began skating in 1984, soon after moving to Japan. She decided to focus on skating as her main activity when she was about eight.

In 1986, Ruh began working with coach Nobuo Sato. She won the bronze medal at the Japan Junior Championships in 1994. Although she initially enjoyed jumps, her interest in them waned as she grew to 5 ft 9 in (175 cm), "Since the center of gravity was higher, combined with the rigid training while growing, I never really had a chance to get my timing and balance back. As a result, injuries from bad falls plagued me even more and I started not liking jumps."

In 1996, she moved to Toronto, Ontario, Canada to work with Toller Cranston. In 1997, she worked with Christy Ness in San Francisco, California but developed two Achilles tendinitis, a ruptured shoulder and Sciatica. In 1998, she moved to Harbin, China to train with Chen Lu's former coach, Hongyun Liu, but although her jumping improved, the Chinese federation objected to a non-national being trained by him. In December, she moved to Switzerland, where she met coach Oliver Höner; it was the first time she had resided in her birth country.

In the summer of 1999, she went to the U.S. and was briefly coached by Galina Zmievskaya but tore knee ligaments and returned to Switzerland for treatment. Her last ISU event was the 1999 Cup of Russia. She sustained an injury after falling on a jump during practice the day before the competition but took three Cortisone injections a day and finished 6th at the event. She later learned she had fractured her spine, resulting in two dislocated discs. Her spinning may also have resulted in subtle concussions. A study is underway to determine whether intensive training of spins may cause concussions.

Ruh represented Club des Patineurs de Geneve. She has cited the pair Ekaterina Gordeeva and Sergei Grinkov as the skaters she admired the most while growing up.

She is the 2000 and 2001 world professional bronze medalist.

Ruh has created over twenty different new spin positions.

Following her retirement, Ruh began working as a coach and a spinning coach specialist. On 3 April 2003, she set a world record for the most continuous upright spins on ice (105 revolutions) at the Rockefeller Plaza outdoor skating rink in New York City, beating the previous record of 60 revolutions by British figure skater Neil Wilson.

She toured around the world from 2000 to 2006 with Stars on Ice USA and Canada, Champions on Ice, Art on Ice to name a few. She skated for many charities and 9/11 memorial at Madison Square Garden and participated in the 2010 and 2011 iterations of "One Step Closer", a figure skating exhibition to benefit the AIDS Resource Foundation for Children. She is the author of Frozen Teardrop, a memoir published by SelectBooks in November 2011.

== Programs ==
Season	Short program	Free skating	Exhibition
1999–2000	On Wings of Song by Felix Mendelssohn	Orchestral Suite No. 3 by Pyotr Ilyich Tchaikovsky	On Wings of Song by Felix Mendelssohn
1998–99	Lawrence of Arabia by Maurice Jarre	Harp Concerto by Reinhold Glière	
1997–98	It Ain't Necessarily So (from Porgy and Bess) by George Gershwin	Harp Concerto by Reinhold Glière	
1996–97	Butterfly Lovers' Violin Concerto by Chen Gang and He Zhanhao	Caprice Viennois, Op. 2 by Fritz Kreisler performed by Itzhak Perlman	
1995–96	Fantaisie-Impromptu by Frédéric Chopin	La Bayadère by Ludwig Minkus	
1994–95	Fantaisie-Impromptu by Frédéric Chopin	Le Corsaire by Adolphe Adam	

== Competitive highlights ==
GP: Champions Series / Grand Prix

International
Event	92–93	93–94	94–95	95–96	96–97	97–98	98–99	99–00
Worlds			18th	19th	15th	23rd	13th	
Europeans				23rd				
GP Cup of Russia								6th
GP Skate Canada				6th	3rd			
Finlandia Trophy						8th		
Nebelhorn Trophy			7th					
Schäfer Memorial					11th			
Skate Israel							10th	
International: Junior
Junior Worlds			6th	9th	7th			
Blue Swords		12th J						
Triglav Trophy	3rd J							
National
Swiss Champ.	1st J	4th	3rd	1st	2nd	2nd	3rd	
J: Junior level; WD: Withdrew
