= Danielle Rieder =

Swiss figure skater

Personal information
- Born: 14 March 1961 (age 65)
- Height: 1.63 m (5 ft 4 in)

Figure skating career
- Country: Switzerland
- Retired: 1980

Danielle Rieder (born 14 March 1961) is a Swiss former competitive figure skater. She placed in the top ten at four European Championships, won two medals at the International St. Gervais and three Swiss national titles. Rieder was selected to compete at two Winter Olympics. She withdrew from the 1976 event in Innsbruck following the compulsory figures, in which she placed 16th, but completed all segments at the 1980 event in Lake Placid, New York, and finished 14th overall.

== Competitive highlights ==
International
Event	75–76	76–77	77–78	78–79	79–80
Winter Olympics	WD				14th
World Championships			16th		WD
European Championships	7th	10th	8th		8th
International St. Gervais	3rd				2nd
National
Swiss Championships	1st	1st	1st		
WD = Withdrew
