= Mikael Redin =

Swiss figure skater

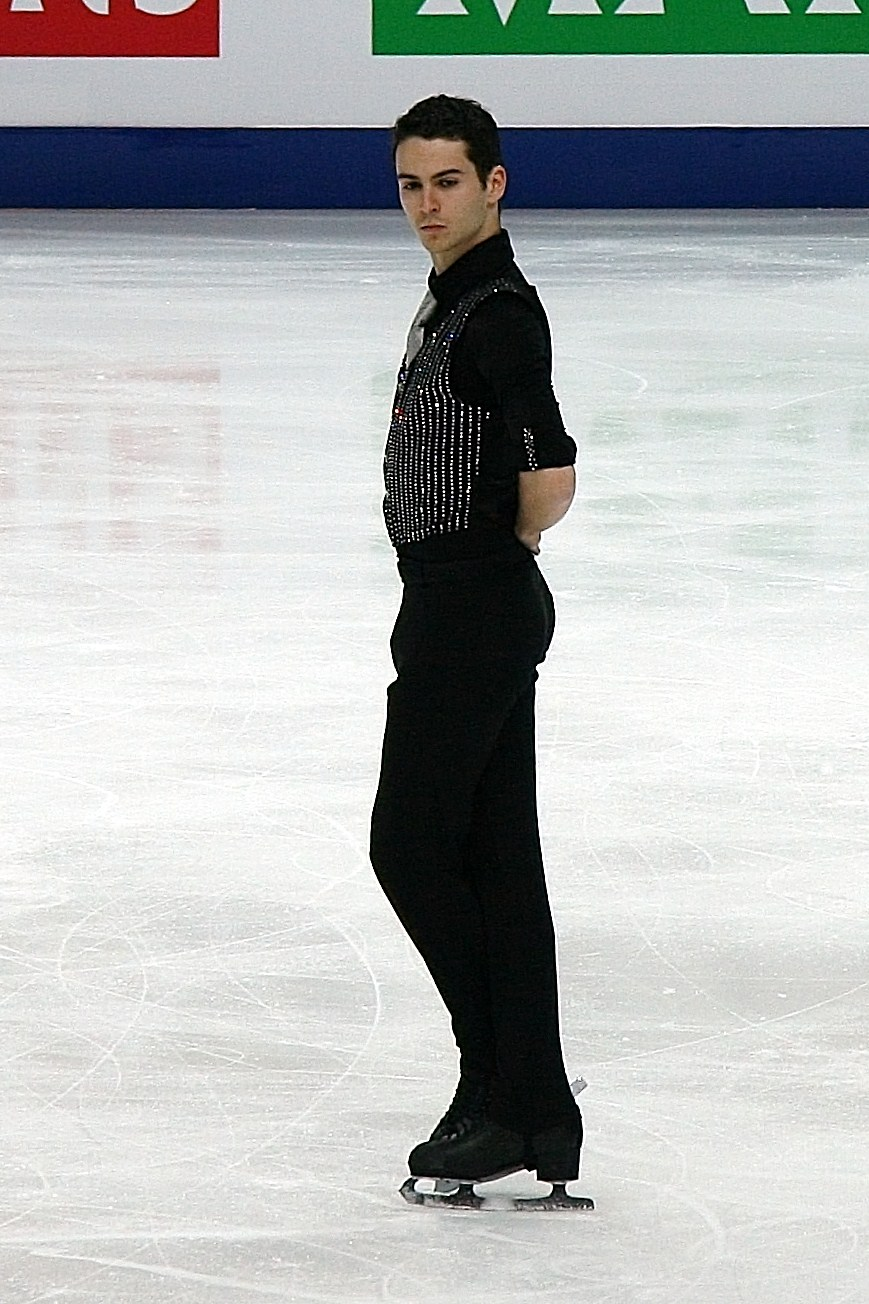
- Redin in 2011

Personal information
- Born: 25 February 1989 (age 37) Metz, France
- Height: 1.75 m (5 ft 9 in)

Figure skating career
- Country: Switzerland
- Coach: Richard Leroy
- Skating club: EC Küsnacht
- Began skating: 1996

Medal record
Swiss Championships
Gold medal – first place	2011 Zug	Singles
Silver medal – second place	2014 La Chaux-de-Fonds	Singles
Bronze medal – third place	2009 La Chaux-de-Fonds	Singles
Bronze medal – third place	2010 Lugano	Singles
Bronze medal – third place	2012 Basel	Singles
Bronze medal – third place	2013 Geneva	Singles

Mikael Redin (born 25 February 1989) is a figure skater who competes in men's singles for Switzerland. He is the 2011 Swiss national champion and competed at two World Championships.

== Programs ==
Season	Short program	Free skating
2012–13	My Immortal by Evanescence	El Asesinato by Sergio Gonzalez Carducci; Poeta En La Mar by Vicente Amigo
2010–11	Triumphant by Röyskopp	The Untouchables by Ennio Morricone
2008–09	Requiem for a Dream by Clint Mansell	Underground by Jamiroquai; Rock Your Body; Cry Me a River by Justin Timberlake
2007–08	Deja Vu by Harry Gregson-Williams; The Fountain by Clint Mansell	Underground by Jamiroquai; Rock Your Body; Cry Me a River by Justin Timberlake

== Competitive highlights ==
JGP: Junior Grand Prix

International
Event	07–08	08–09	09–10	10–11	11–12	12–13	13–14
World Champ.		42nd		17th P			
Bavarian Open				5th		16th	
Crystal Skate				3rd	4th		
Finlandia Trophy						11th	
Ice Challenge			20th				
Lombardia Trophy							7th
Merano Cup			11th				
Mont Blanc			6th				
Nebelhorn Trophy		16th					
Nepela Memorial				7th			
Printemps					6th		
Schäfer Memorial		11th					
Triglav Trophy		6th	6th				
Volvo Open Cup							17th
Warsaw Cup						7th	
International: Junior
JGP Germany	17th						
Cup of Nice	3rd J						
Golden Bear	1st J						
National
Swiss Champ.	5th	3rd	3rd	1st	3rd	3rd	2nd
J = Junior level; P = Preliminary round
