= Laurent Alvarez =

Swiss figure skater

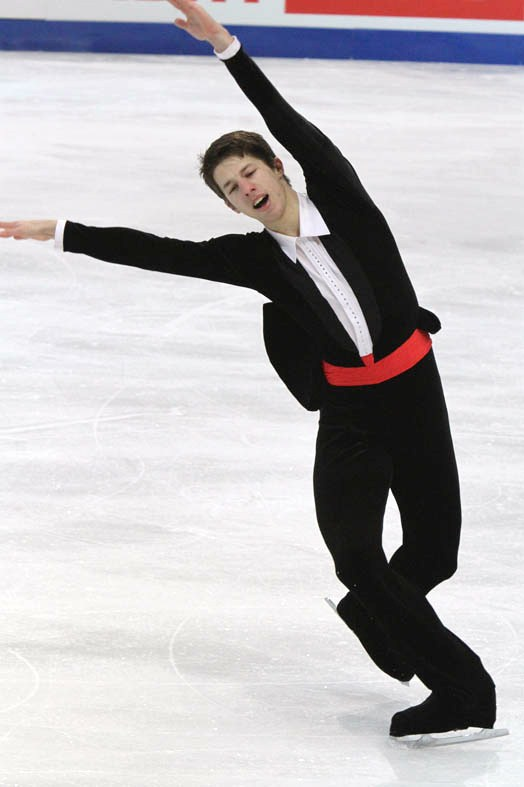
- Alvarez in 2011.

Personal information
- Born: 23 September 1990 (age 35) Geneva, Switzerland
- Height: 1.81 m (5 ft 11 1/2 in)

Figure skating career
- Country: Switzerland
- Discipline: Men's singles
- Began skating: 1994
- Retired: 2012

Medal record
Swiss Championships
Gold medal – first place	2012 Basel	Singles
Silver medal – second place	2011 Zug	Singles

Laurent Alvarez (born 23 September 1990 in Geneva) is a Swiss former competitive figure skater. He is the 2012 Swiss national champion and competed at three ISU Championships, reaching the free skate at the 2011 European Championships. He was coached by Peter Grütter and retired from competition in 2012.

== Programs ==
Season	Short program	Free skating
2011–2012	La Forza del Destino by Giuseppe Verdi	Allegro; Passo; Staccato; Dare Dard all by René Aubry
2010–2011	Piano Concerto No. 2 in C minor by Sergei Rachmaninoff	The Gypsy Baron by Johann Strauss II
2007–2008	Athina Erota Musicalworld; Stalia, Stalia; Tria Pedia	L'apprenti Sorcier by Paul Dukas; Peer Gynt Suite No. 1 Morning Mood; In the Hall of the Mountain King by Edvard Grieg; L'apprenti Sorcier by Paul Dukas

== Results ==
International
Event	2004–05	2005–06	2006–07	2007–08	2008–09	2009–10	2010–11	2011–12
Worlds								34th
Europeans							22nd	30th
Challenge Cup					14th			10th
Cup of Nice						17th		12th
Ice Challenge							5th	
Nebelhorn							12th	
Universiade							8th	
International: Junior
JGP Austria				18th				
JGP Germany				19th				
JGP Netherlands			20th					
JGP Spain					13th			
JGP U.K.					14th			
EYOF			14th					
National
Swiss Champ.	1st J.	6th	4th	6th	4th	4th	2nd	1st
