= Diane Gerencser =

Italia-Swiss figure skater

Personal information
- Born: 27 January 1972 (age 54) Geneva, Switzerland
- Height: 1.65 m (5 ft 5 in)

Figure skating career
- Country: Italy; Switzerland
- Retired: 1998

Diane Gerencser (born 27 January 1972) is a former ice dancer who competed internationally for both Switzerland and Italy. She placed as high as 15th at the World Championships—in 1990 with Alexander Stanislavov—and as high as 11th at the European Championships—in 1997 with Pasquale Camerlengo. She and Camerlengo represented Italy at the 1998 Winter Olympics, placing 17th.

== Career ==
From 1988 to 1991, Gerencser competed for Switzerland with Alexander Stanislavov. Their highest ISU Championship placements were 15th at the 1990 World Championships and 13th at the 1991 European Championships.

From 1992 to 1995, Gerencser competed with Bernard Columberg, also for Switzerland. They appeared at three World Championships, achieving their best result, 18th, in 1993, and at three European Championships, attaining a rank of 15th in 1995.

In 1996, Gerencser began competing with Pasquale Camerlengo for Italy. They were coached by Muriel Boucher-Zazoui in Villard-de-Lans and Lyon. The duo placed 11th at the 1997 European Championships and 17th at the 1998 Winter Olympics in Nagano, Japan. They retired from competition after the 1998 World Championships.

== Results ==
=== With Camerlengo ===
International
Event	1996–97	1997–98
Winter Olympics		17th
World Championships		16th
European Championships	11th	13th
Lysiane Lauret	1st	
Autumn Trophy	2nd	

=== With Columberg ===
Event	1992–93	1993–94	1994–95
World Championships	18th	23rd	20th
European Championships	16th	17th	15th
Swiss Championships	1st	1st	1st
Skate Canada International			8th
Trophée Lalique			8th
Nations Cup			8th

=== With Stanislavov ===
Event	1988–89	1989–90	1990–91
World Championships	24th	15th	16th
European Championships	19th	16th	13th
Swiss Championships	1st	1st	1st
Trophée Lalique	7th	7th	WD
WD = Withdrew
