= Romy Bühler =

Swiss figure skater

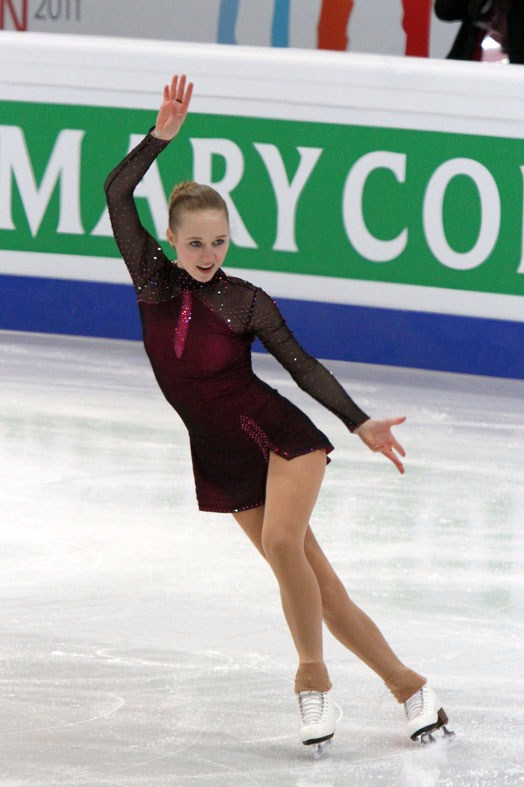
- Bühler at the 2011 European Championships

Personal information
- Born: 23 September 1994 (age 32) Zürich, Switzerland
- Home town: Gockhausen
- Height: 1.65 m (5 ft 5 in)

Figure skating career
- Country: Switzerland
- Coach: Linda Van Troyen
- Skating club: Eislaufclub Küsnacht (until 2011), Winterthurer Schlittschuh-Club
- Began skating: 1998
- Retired: 2013

Medal record
Swiss Championships
Gold medal – first place	2012 Basel	Singles
Silver medal – second place	2009 La Chaux-de-Fonds	Singles
Silver medal – second place	2011 Zug	Singles
Bronze medal – third place	2010 Lugano	Singles

Romy Bühler (born 23 September 1994 in Zürich) is a Swiss retired figure skater. She represented her country at the 2012 World Championships, two European Championships, and three World Junior Championships.

After eight years training under Linda van Troyen in Küsnacht, she switched to Evi Fehr at Winterthurer Schlittschuh-Club in 2011.

== Programs ==
Season	Short program	Free skating
2012–2013	Bei Mir Bistu Shein by Sholom Secunda	Tango de Roxane (from Moulin Rouge!)
2011–2012	Bei Mir Bistu Shein by Sholom Secunda	The Gypsy Baron by Johann Strauss II
2010–2011	Summertime by Gene Harris and The Three Sounds	The Gypsy Baron by Johann Strauss II
2008–2009	Boléro by Maurice Ravel	Tango Vision

== Competitive highlights ==
JGP: Junior Grand Prix

International
Event	08–09	09–10	10–11	11–12	12–13
Worlds				23rd	
Europeans			16th	20th	
Challenge Cup				8th	
Gardena			7th		
Merano Cup		7th	7th		
Mont Blanc		5th			
NRW Trophy					24th
Triglav Trophy		12th			
International: Junior
Junior Worlds	27th	13th	14th		
JGP Japan			10th		
JGP Poland				12th	
Bavarian Open			1st J		
National
Swiss Champ.	2nd	3rd	2nd	1st	6th
J: Junior level
