= Nathalie Krieg =

Swiss figure skater (born 1977)

Personal information
- Full name: Nathalie Krieg
- Born: 21 October 1977 (age 48)

Figure skating career
- Country: Switzerland
- Skating club: Schlittschuh-Club Biel
- Retired: 1995

Nathalie Krieg (born 21 October 1977) is a Swiss former competitive figure skater. She is the 1993 and 1994 Swiss national champion. She represented Switzerland at the 1994 Winter Olympics, where she placed 16th. Krieg competed three times at the World Championships, with a highest placement of 14th in 1994, and four times at the European Championships, with a highest placement of 10th in 1994.

Krieg was known for her intricate spins with a variety of positions; she also once spun for also three and a half minutes straight on a TV show. She trained spins in preference to jumps because she had a limited amount of on-ice training time and the ice sessions were crowded.

== Results ==
International
Event	1990–91	1991–92	1992–93	1993–94	1994–95
Winter Olympics				16th	
World Championships		16th	19th	14th	
European Championships	15th		14th	10th	19th
Skate America		10th			
Nations Cup	8th				
Int. de Paris/Trophée de France		8th			10th
Vienna Cup			5th		
International
Swiss Championships			1st	1st	
