= François Pache =

Swiss figure skater

Gaston François Louis Pache
Personal information
- Born: 1 June 1932 Lausanne, Switzerland

Figure skating career
- Country: Switzerland

François Pache (born 1 June 1932) is a Swiss figure skater. He is a six-time (1951–1952, 1954, 1956, 1958, 1962) Swiss national champion. He represented Switzerland at the 1952 Winter Olympics and at the 1956 Winter Olympics. He placed 9th in the men's event in 1952 and 11th in 1956.

== Competitive highlights ==
Event	1951	1952	1953	1954	1955	1956	1957	1958	1959	1960	1961	1962
Winter Olympic Games		9th				11th						
World Championships		11th				10th		18th				
European Championships	6th			9th		7th		13th	11th	13th		
Swiss Championships	1st	1st	2nd	1st		1st	2nd	1st	2nd	2nd	2nd	1st
