= Leonie Krail =

Swiss ice dancer

Personal information
- Born: 9 September 1986 (age 40) Wynigen, Switzerland
- Height: 1.73 m (5 ft 8 in)

Figure skating career
- Country: Switzerland
- Began skating: 1991
- Retired: 2010

Medal record
Swiss Championships
Gold medal – first place	2006 Biasca	Ice dance
Gold medal – first place	2008 Winterthur	Ice dance
Gold medal – first place	2009 La Chaux-de-Fonds	Ice dance
Silver medal – second place	2010 Lugano	Ice dance
Bronze medal – third place	2005 Lausanne	Ice dance
Bronze medal – third place	2007 Geneva	Ice dance

Leonie Krail (born 9 September 1986) is a Swiss former competitive ice dancer. With Oscar Peter, she is a three-time Swiss national champion (2006, 2008, 2009) and competed in the final segment at four ISU Championships – 2006 Europeans, 2008 Europeans, 2009 Europeans, and 2008 Worlds.

Earlier in her career, Krail competed with Marc Fausch. After Fausch quit, she was without a partner for six months and then teamed up with Oscar Peter, in 2003. Krail/Peter were coached by Natalia Linichuk and Gennadi Karponosov in Aston, Pennsylvania.

== Programs ==
(with Oscar Peter)

Season	Original dance	Free dance
2008–2009	Jazz: In the Mood by The Puppini Sisters; Swing: Sing You Sinners by The Manhattan Transfer	Quelques Cris; Requiem Pour Un Fou by Johnny Hallyday
2007–2008	Flamenco	Concierto de Aranjuez by Joaquín Rodrigo
2005–2006	Salsa; Rhumba; Samba	Notre-Dame de Paris by Luc Plamondon, Riccardo Cocciante

== Competitive highlights ==
=== With Peter ===
International
Event	04–05	05–06	06–07	07–08	08–09	09–10
World Champ.				24th	27th	
European Champ.		22nd		20th	21st	
Mont Blanc Trophy						10th
Nebelhorn Trophy		14th			12th	
NRW Trophy				2nd		
National
Swiss Champ.	3rd	1st	3rd	1st	1st	2nd

=== With Fausch ===
National
Event	2002–03
Swiss Championships	2nd
