= Oscar Peter =

Swiss figure skater

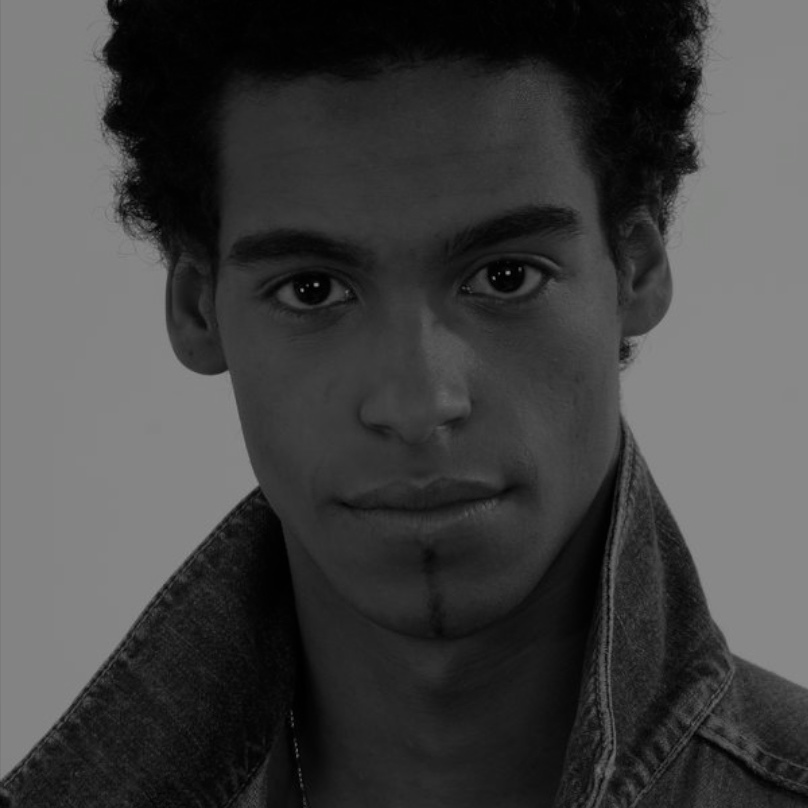
- Oscar Peter in 2012

Personal information
- Born: 11 June 1981 (age 45) Santiago de los Caballeros, Dominican Republic
- Height: 1.78 m (5 ft 10 in)

Figure skating career
- Country: Switzerland
- Began skating: 1990
- Retired: 2010

Medal record
Swiss Championships
Gold medal – first place	2006 Biasca	Ice dance
Gold medal – first place	2008 Winterthur	Ice dance
Gold medal – first place	2009 La Chaux-de-Fonds	Ice dance
Silver medal – second place	2010 Lugano	Ice dance
Bronze medal – third place	2005 Lausanne	Ice dance
Bronze medal – third place	2007 Geneva	Ice dance

Oscar Peter (born June 11, 1981) is a Swiss former competitive figure skater. As a single skater, he is a six-time Swiss national medalist, winning silver from 1998–2000 and bronze from 2001–2003. He took up ice dancing in 2003 and teamed up with Leonie Krail. Together, they became three-time Swiss national champions (2006, 2008, 2009) and competed in the final segment at four ISU Championships – 2006 Europeans, 2008 Europeans, 2009 Europeans, and 2008 Worlds. They were coached by Natalia Linichuk and Gennadi Karponosov in Aston, Pennsylvania.

As of 2016, Peter is working as a skating coach and choreographer in the UK and around Europe.

== Programs ==
(with Krail)

Season	Original dance	Free dance
2008–2009	Jazz: In the Mood by The Puppini Sisters; Swing: Sing You Sinners by The Manhattan Transfer	Quelques Cris; Requiem Pour Un Fou by Johnny Hallyday
2007–2008	Flamenco	Concierto de Aranjuez by Joaquín Rodrigo
2005–2006	Salsa; Rhumba; Samba	Notre-Dame de Paris by Luc Plamondon, Riccardo Cocciante

== Competitive highlights ==
=== Ice dancing with Krail ===
International
Event	04–05	05–06	06–07	07–08	08–09	09–10
World Champ.				24th	27th	
European Champ.		22nd		20th	21st	
Mont Blanc Trophy						10th
Nebelhorn Trophy		14th			12th	
NRW Trophy				2nd		
National
Swiss Champ.	3rd	1st	3rd	1st	1st	2nd

=== Single skating ===
JGP: Junior Grand Prix

International
Event	95–96	96–97	97–98	98–99	99–00	00–01	01–02	02–03
Europeans					30th			
Golden Spin						13th	13th	
Nebelhorn Trophy						17th		
International
Junior Worlds				21st				
JGP Germany				8th				
JGP Netherlands					WD			
JGP Slovakia				15th				
JGP Sweden					10th			
Gardena			9th J					
National
Swiss Champ.	1st J	1st J	2nd	2nd	2nd	3rd	3rd	3rd
J = Junior level; WD = Withdrew
