= Fränzi Schmidt =

Swiss figure skater

Personal information
- Full name: Franziska Schmidt
- Born: 5 July 1943 (age 83)

Figure skating career
- Country: Switzerland
- Skating club: EC Zürich
- Retired: 1964

Franziska "Fränzi" Schmidt (born 5 July 1943) is a Swiss former figure skater who competed in ladies' singles. She is a three-time Swiss national champion. She finished in the top ten at two European Championships and competed at two Winter Olympics, placing 22nd in 1960 and 23rd in 1964.

== Results ==
International
Event	1959	1960	1961	1962	1963	1964
Winter Olympics		22nd				23rd
World Championships		19th		14th	14th	
European Champ.	14th	17th	13th	7th	9th	12th
National
Swiss Championships	2nd	2nd	1st	1st	2nd	1st
