= Nicolas Roulet =

Swiss pair skater

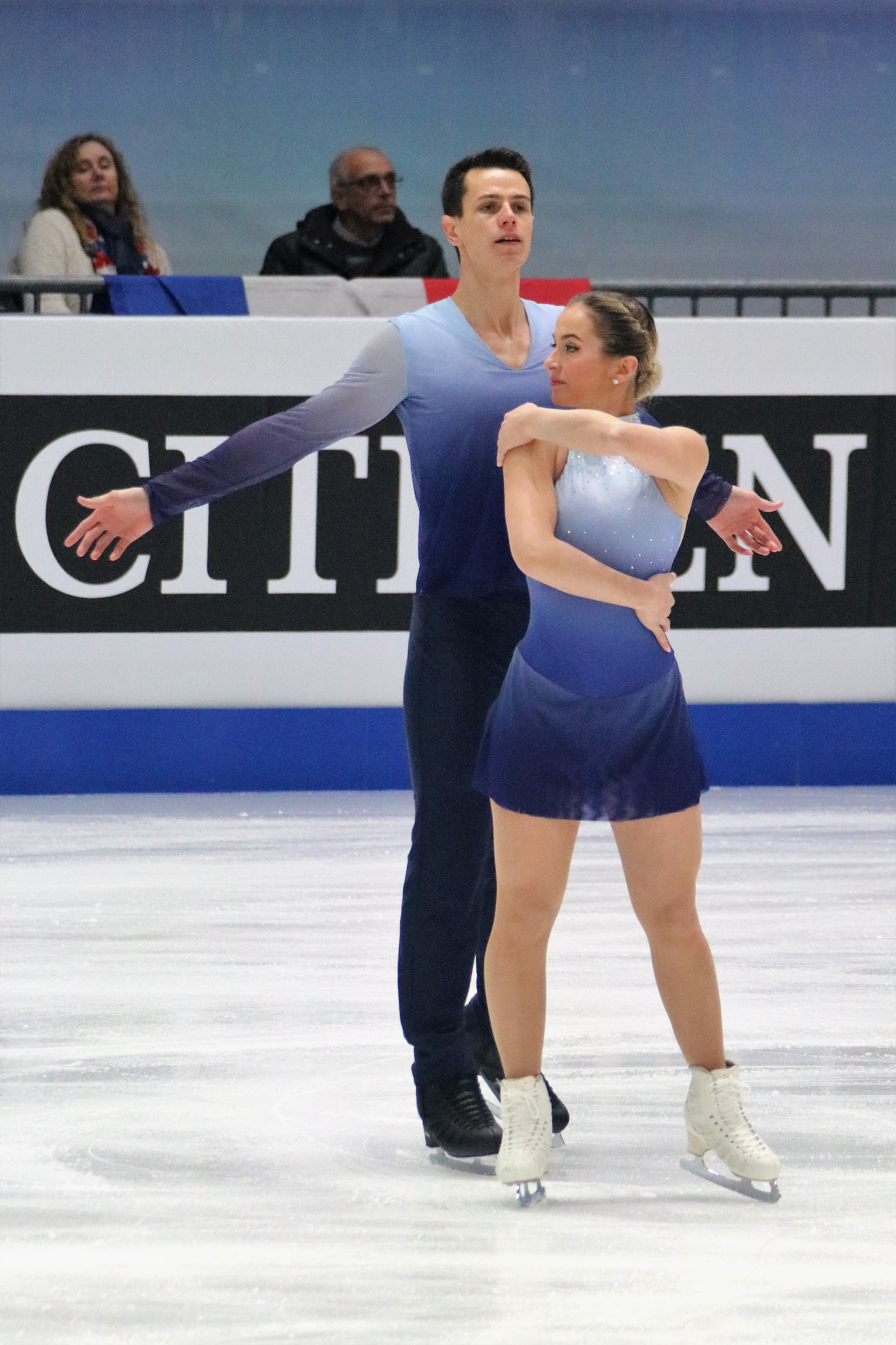
- Herbríková and Roulet at the 2020 European Championships

Personal information
- Born: 24 August 1994 (age 32) Neuchâtel, Switzerland
- Height: 1.87 m (6 ft 1 1/2 in)

Figure skating career
- Country: Switzerland
- Partner: Alexandra Herbríková
- Coach: Ondřej Hotárek
- Skating club: CP Neuchâtel-Sports
- Began skating: 1996

Medal record
Representing Switzerland
Swiss Championships
| Gold medal – first place | 2015 Lugano | Pairs |
| Gold medal – first place | 2016 Lausanne | Pairs |
| Gold medal – first place | 2019 Wetzikon | Pairs |
| Gold medal – first place | 2020 Biel/Bienne | Pairs |
| Silver medal – second place | 2014 La Chaux-de-Fonds | Pairs |
| Silver medal – second place | 2017 Lucerne | Pairs |

Nicolas Roulet (born 24 August 1994) is a Swiss pair skater. With his skating partner, Alexandra Herbríková, he is the 2017 Bavarian Open silver medalist and a three-time Swiss national champion. They competed in the free skate at the 2016 European Championships in Bratislava.

== Programs ==
(with Herbríková)

| Season | Short program | Free skating |
|---|---|---|
| 2020–2021 | All That Jazz (from Chicago) by Fred Ebb, John Kander | The Mummy by Jerry Goldsmith; Imhotep the High Priest by David Fletcher; Incantation by Benoît Jutras |
| 2016–2017 | Grease Lightnin' by Jim Jacob, Warren Casey; Hound Dog by Jerry Laiber, Miko Stoller choreo. by Pierre-Loup Bouquet, B. Appleyard | Tristan et Iseult by Maxime Rodriguez choreo. by Florentine Houdinière |
| 2015–2016 | Dead Silence by Charlie Clouser | Chambers by Chilly Gonzalez |

== Competitive highlights ==
CS: Challenger Series

=== With Herbríková ===
International
| Event | 13–14 | 14–15 | 15–16 | 16–17 | 18–19 | 19–20 | 20-21 |
|---|---|---|---|---|---|---|---|
| European Champ. | | | 16th | | | 18th | |
| CS Cup of Tyrol | | | | | | | C |
| CS Finlandia Trophy | | | | 8th | | 11th | |
| CS Golden Spin | | | | | | 18th | |
| CS Nebelhorn Trophy | | | | 8th | | | |
| CS Nepela Trophy | | | 8th | | | | |
| CS Warsaw Cup | | | 7th | | | 19th | |
| Bavarian Open | | 5th | | 2nd | 6th | 7th | |
| Challenge Cup | | | | | 5th | 12th | 10th |
| NRW Trophy | | 2nd | | | | | |
| Seibt Memorial | | | 4th | | | | |
| Toruń Cup | | | | 6th | | | |
| Volvo Open | | | | | | 9th | |
National
| Swiss Champ. | 2nd | 1st | 1st | 2nd | 1st | 1st | |
TBD = Assigned

=== With Heinkel ===
National
| Event | 2012–13 |
|---|---|
| Swiss Championships | 1st J |
J = Junior level
