= Gerda Johner =

Swiss pair skater

Personal information
- Born: 20 July 1944 (age 81)

Figure skating career
- Country: Switzerland
Medal record
Representing Switzerland
Pairs' Figure skating
European Championships
Silver medal – second place	1965 Moscow	Pairs

Gerda Johner (born 20 July 1944) is a Swiss former pair skater. Competing with Rüdi Johner, she was a nine-time gold medalists at the Swiss Figure Skating Championships from 1957 to 1965. The pair finished sixth at the 1964 Winter Olympics, and the following year, they won the silver medal at the European Figure Skating Championships and finished fourth at the World Figure Skating Championships.

== Results ==
(pairs with Rüdi Johner)

International
Event	1957	1958	1959	1960	1961	1962	1963	1964	1965
Winter Olympics								5th	
World Championships						7th	6th		4th
European Champ.			11th	9th	8th	4th	6th	5th	2nd
National
Swiss Championships	1st	1st	1st	1st	1st	1st	1st	1st	1st
