= Myriam Oberwiler =

Swiss figure skater

Personal information
- Other names: Myriam Loriol-Oberwiler; Myriam Loriol
- Born: 19 November 1962 (age 63) Zürich, Switzerland
- Height: 1.59 m (5 ft 2 1/2 in)

Figure skating career
- Country: Switzerland
- Retired: 1984

Myriam Loriol-Oberwiler (born 19 November 1962 in Zurich) is a Swiss former competitive figure skater. Appearing as Myriam Oberwiler in ladies' singles, she became a two-time Swiss national champion (1982 and 1984) and finished 14th at the 1984 Winter Olympics.

Working in Neuchâtel, Loriol-Oberwiler coached Stéphane Walker (? – 2015) and Nicola Todeschini (? – spring 2013). She retired from coaching by the end of 2015. She has also worked as an International Skating Union technical specialist.

== Competitive highlights ==
International
Event	1979–80	1981–82	1982–83	1983–84
Winter Olympics				14th
World Champ.		20th		11th
European Champ.	16th	11th		
Prague Skate	3rd			4th
National
Swiss Champ.		1st		1st
