= Maja Hug =

Swiss figure skater (1928–2023)

Personal information
- Full name: Maja Hug
- Born: 5 April 1928 Zürich, Switzerland
- Died: 26 April 2023 (aged 95) Winterthur, Switzerland
- Height: 1.65 m (5 ft 5 in)

Figure skating career
- Country: Switzerland
- Skating club: SC Zürich; SC St. Moritz

Maja Hug (5 April 1928 – 26 April 2023) was a Swiss figure skater. She was born in Zürich. She is a six-time (1945–1950) Swiss national champion. She represented Switzerland at the 1948 Winter Olympics where she placed 15th. Hug held the record for most Swiss national titles won by a woman until Sarah Meier won her seventh national title in the 2007-2008 season. She died in Winterthur on 26 April 2023, at the age of 95.

== Competitive highlights ==
Event	1945	1946	1947	1948	1949	1950
Winter Olympic Games				15th		
World Championships				14th		
European Championships			8th			
Swiss Championships	1st	1st	1st	1st	1st	1st

== Sources ==
- Evans, Hilary; Gjerde, Arild; Heijmans, Jeroen; Mallon, Bill; et al. "Maya Hug". Olympics at Sports-Reference.com. Sports Reference LLC. Archived from the original on 2020-04-18.
- List of Historical Swiss Champions
