= Lucian Büeler =

Swiss figure skater

Personal information
- Born: 28 March 1910 Zürich, Switzerland
- Died: 6 February 1952 (aged 41) Solothurn, Switzerland

Figure skating career
- Country: Switzerland
- Skating club: SC Zürich

Lucian Büeler (28 March 1910 – 6 February 1952) was a Swiss civil engineer and figure skater. He was the 1935-1937 Swiss national champion. He represented Switzerland at the 1936 Winter Olympics where he placed 17th. As a civil engineer, he worked in Argentina from 1939 to 1947 and constructed South America's first artificial ice rink in Buenos Aires.

== Competitive highlights ==
Event	1935	1936	1937
Winter Olympic Games		17th	
World Championships		14th	10th
European Championships	10th		
Swiss Championships	1st	1st	1st
