= Markus Germann =

Swiss figure skater

Personal information
- Full name: Markus Arthur Germann
- Born: 9 May 1942 (age 84)

Figure skating career
- Country: Switzerland

Markus Arthur Germann (born 9 May 1942) is a Swiss figure skater. He is the 1963 & 1964 Swiss national champion. He represented Switzerland at the 1964 Winter Olympics, where he placed 19th.

He has served as an ISU referee for Switzerland.

== Competitive highlights ==
Event	1960	1961	1962	1963	1964
Winter Olympic Games					19th
European Championships			19th	17th	13th
Swiss Championships	3rd	3rd	2nd	1st	1st
