= Karin Iten =

Swiss figure skater

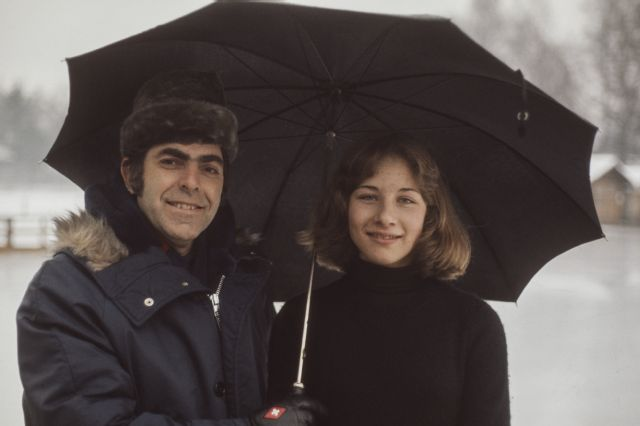
- Iten in 1973 with Swiss television commentator Jan Hiermeyer

Personal information
- Born: 11 August 1956
- Died: 18 May 2010 (aged 53) Winterthur, Switzerland

Figure skating career
- Country: Switzerland
Medal record
Representing Switzerland
Figure skating: Ladies' singles
European Championships
Bronze medal – third place	1973 Cologne	Ladies' singles

Karin Iten (11 August 1956 – 18 May 2010) was a Swiss figure skater. She won the bronze medal at the 1973 European Figure Skating Championships. She died on 18 May 2010 in Winterthur from the effects of diabetes. She was among the earliest skaters to perform the Biellmann spin, which was later named after Denise Biellmann, who popularised the spin.

== Results ==
International
Event	1971–72	1972–73	1973–74	1974–75
World Champ.	12th	6th	5th	21st
European Champ.	15th	3rd	5th	10th
Richmond Trophy		2nd		
Prague Skate	3rd	4th		
National
Swiss Champ.		1st	1st	1st

Awards
Preceded by (Switzerland) Marie-Theres Nadig	Swiss Sportswoman of the Year; 1973	Succeeded by (Switzerland) Lise-Marie Morerod
