= Karl Enderlin =

Swiss figure skater

Personal information
- Full name: Karl Enderlin
- Born: 1 August 1923
- Died: 11 November 2004 (aged 81) Zürich

Figure skating career
- Country: Switzerland
- Skating club: SC Zürich

Karl Enderlin (1 August 1923 – 11 November 2004 in Zürich) was a Swiss figure skater. He was a four-time (1940–1942, 1945) Swiss national champion. He represented Switzerland at the 1948 Winter Olympics where he placed 14th.

== Results ==
Event	1940	1941	1942	1945	1948
Winter Olympic Games					14th
Swiss Championships	1st	1st	1st	1st	2nd
