= Antoine Dorsaz =

Swiss pair skater

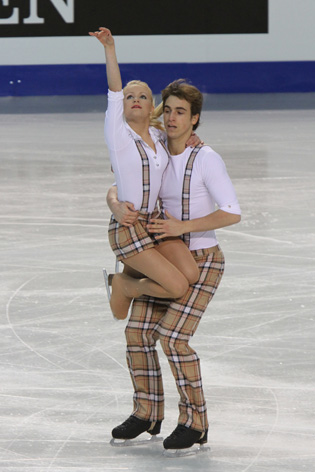
- Morand & Dorsaz in 2010

Personal information
- Full name: Antoine Dorsaz
- Born: 2 March 1989 (age 37) Martigny
- Home town: Fully
- Height: 1.83 m (6 ft 0 in)

Figure skating career
- Country: Switzerland
- Began skating: 1999
- Retired: 2010

Medal record
Swiss Championships
Gold medal – first place	2008 Winterthur	Pairs
Gold medal – first place	2009 La Chaux-de-Fonds	Pairs
Gold medal – first place	2010 Lugano	Pairs

Antoine Dorsaz (born 2 March 1989 in Martigny, Valais) is a Swiss retired pair skater. With former partner Anaïs Morand, he is the 2008–2010 Swiss national champion.

== Career ==
Morand and Dorsaz teamed up in 2005. They spent their first two seasons together on the junior circuit. In 2008-9 they competed in both juniors and seniors, finishing 12th at the European Championships and 10th at the World Junior Championships. They were not able to qualify a spot for Switzerland for the Winter Olympics.

Morand and Dorsaz began the 2009-10 season at the 2009 Nebelhorn Trophy, where they qualified a spot for Switzerland at the 2010 Winter Olympics. They continued to skate on the junior Grand Prix circuit and moved up to 8th at the European Championships. They were 15th at the Olympics and moved up to 13th at Worlds. Dorsaz retired from competitive skating after the 2010 season, citing lack of motivation.

== Programmes ==
(with Morand)

Season	Short programme	Free skating
2008–2010	Bohemian Rhapsody by Queen	Once Upon a Time in America by Ennio Morricone
2007–2008	Réveil (from Cirque du Soleil's Quidam) by Benoît Jutras	Carmen by Georges Bizet
2006–2007	Cirque du Soleil by René Dupéré	Ouverture (from The Haunted Mansion) by Mark Mancina

== Competitive highlights ==
(with Morand)

Results
International
Event	2006–07	2007–08	2008–09	2009–10
Olympics				15th
Worlds			14th	13th
Europeans			12th	8th
Nebehorn				5th
International: Junior or novice
Junior Worlds	11th	12th	10th	
JGP Belarus			6th	
JGP Czech Republic	10th		8th	
JGP Estonia		15th		
JGP Germany				4th
JGP Great Britain		14th		
JGP Norway	9th			
JGP USA				6th
National
Swiss Champ.	1st J.	1st	1st	1st
JGP = Junior Grand Prix; J. = Junior
