= Nicole Graf =

Swiss figure skater

Personal information
- Born: 7 May 1985 (age 41) Wil, Switzerland

Figure skating career
- Country: Switzerland
- Discipline: Women's singles

Medal record
Swiss Championships
Gold medal – first place	2013 Geneva	Singles
Bronze medal – third place	2014 La Chaux-de-Fonds	Singles

Nicole Graf (born 7 May 1985 in Wil, Switzerland) is a Swiss figure skater who competes in ladies singles. She won the gold medal at the 2009 Swiss Figure Skating Championships and finished 26th at the European Figure Skating Championships that year. In 2012, she captured the bronze medal at the Swiss Nationals.
