= Ramona Elsener =

Swiss ice dancer

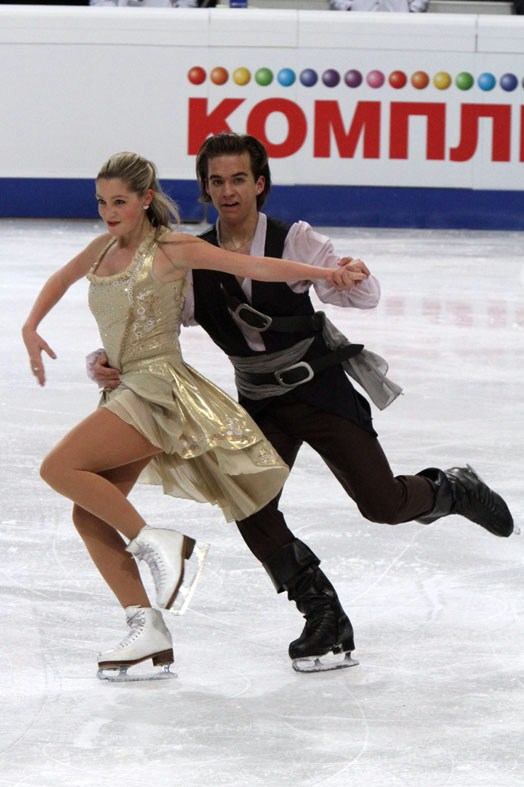
- Elsener and Roost in 2011

Personal information
- Born: 27 February 1992 (age 34) Bülach, Switzerland
- Height: 1.63 m (5 ft 4 in)

Figure skating career
- Country: Switzerland
- Coach: Cornelia Diener, Pasquale Camerlengo
- Skating club: Bülacher EC
- Began skating: 1996

Medal record
Swiss Championships
| Gold medal – first place | 2010 Lugano | Ice dance |
| Gold medal – first place | 2011 Zug | Ice dance |
| Gold medal – first place | 2012 Basel | Ice dance |
| Gold medal – first place | 2013 Geneva | Ice dance |
| Gold medal – first place | 2014 La Chaux-de-Fonds | Ice dance |

Ramona Elsener (born 27 February 1992) is a Swiss ice dancer. With former partner Florian Roost, she is the 2010–2014 Swiss national champion.

Elsener/Roost teamed up in 2005. They began appearing in international junior events in 2007. They were sent to five World Junior Championships and achieved their best result, 14th, in 2011. They also competed at five European Championships and three World Championships. In May 2014, Roost decided to retire from competition.

== Programs ==
(with Roost)

| Season | Short dance | Free dance |
|---|---|---|
| 2013–2014 | Quickstep: I'm Sitting on Top of the World; Foxtrot: Call Me Irresponsible | Roxanne by Sting and Marianito Mores; Oblivion for Piano Trio by Astor Piazzolla; El Tango de Roxanne (from Moulin Rouge!) |
| 2012–2013 | Polka: Pie in the Face Polka; Waltz: Carnival de Venice medley | Autant en emporte le vent by Gérard Presgurvic |
| 2011–2012 | Rhumba: Ramona la Bailadora; Samba: Maria by Ricky Martin | Michael Meets Mozart; Love Story meets Viva la Vida by Jon Schmidt |
| 2010–2011 | Waltz: Violente Valse by Caravan Palace | Pirates of the Caribbean: Drink Up, Me Hearties by Hans Zimmer; Fog Bound; The Black Pearl; He's a Pirate by Klaus Badelt |
| | Original dance | |
| 2009–2010 | Swiss folk dance: Alphorn Jodel; Tour de Suisse; Sumpfbode Ländler | Le Port d'Amsterdam by Jacques Brel |
| 2008–2009 | US Army in the 40s by The Star Sisters | Angel and Devil by Maxime Rodriguez |
| 2007–2008 | Swiss folk | Phantom of the Opera by Andrew Lloyd Webber |
| 2006–2007 | El Tango de Roxanne (from Moulin Rouge!) | Roméo et Juliette by Gérard Presgurvic |

== Competitive highlights ==
(with Roost)

International
| Event | 06–07 | 07–08 | 08–09 | 09–10 | 10–11 | 11–12 | 12–13 | 13–14 |
|---|---|---|---|---|---|---|---|---|
| Worlds | | | | | 25th | 30th | | 25th |
| Europeans | | | | 25th | 19th | 22nd | 18th | 22nd |
| Bavarian Open | | | | | 5th | 5th | 9th | 6th |
| Cup of Nice | | | | | | 10th | 10th | 6th |
| Finlandia Trophy | | | | | | | 6th | 8th |
| Ice Challenge | | | | | 10th | 8th | 3rd | 6th |
| Mont Blanc Trophy | | | | 12th | | | | |
| Nebelhorn Trophy | | | | | | | 8th | 14th |
| Pavel Roman | | | | | | 4th | | |
| Skate Down Under | | | | | | | | 2nd |
| Trophy of Lyon | | | | | | 5th | | |
| Volvo Open Cup | | | | | | | | 7th |
International: Junior
| Junior Worlds | 21st | 27th | 28th | 27th | 14th | | | |
| JGP Austria | | 15th | | | 7th | | | |
| JGP Germany | | 11th | | 16th | 13th | | | |
| JGP USA | | | | 12th | | | | |
| Ice Challenge | | | | 3rd | | | | |
National
| Swiss Champ. | 1st J | 1st J | 1st J | 1st | 1st | 1st | 1st | 1st |
