= Tina Stuerzinger =

Swiss figure skater

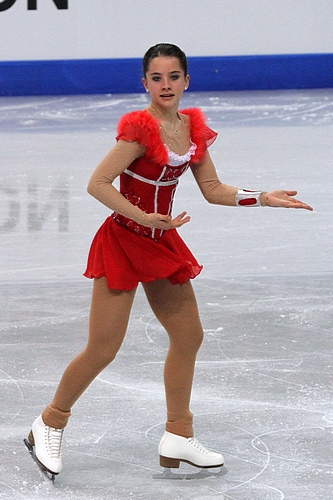
- Tina Stuerzinger in 2012

Personal information
- Born: 26 February 1996 (age 30) Zurich, Switzerland
- Home town: Erlenbach, Switzerland
- Height: 1.64 m (5 ft 4 1/2 in)

Figure skating career
- Country: Switzerland
- Coach: Gheorghe Chiper, Linda van Troyen
- Skating club: Eissport Club Zürick Oerlikon
- Began skating: 1999

Medal record
Swiss Championships
Gold medal – first place	2013 Geneva	Singles
Bronze medal – third place	2014 La Chaux-de-Fonds	Singles

Tina Stuerzinger (born 26 February 1996) is a Swiss figure skater. She is the 2013 Swiss national champion and competed in the free skate at two ISU Championships – the 2012 World Junior Championships in Minsk, Belarus, and 2013 European Championships in Zagreb, Croatia.

== Programs ==
Season	Short program	Free skating
2013–2014	Moonlight Sonata performed by Viktor Zinchuk	The Mission by Ennio Morricone
2012–2013	Tango medley	Csárdás
2011–2012	Coppélia by Léo Delibes	Romeo and Juliet by Nino Rota
2010–2011	Anastasia by David Newman	Gypsy music

== Competitive highlights ==
JGP: Junior Grand Prix

International
Event	10–11	11–12	12–13	13–14	14–15
Worlds			30th		
Europeans			20th		
Bavarian Open			5th	8th	
Challenge Cup			12th		
Cup of Nice		16th	20th		17th
Merano Cup		13th			
Nebelhorn				23rd	
Slovenia Open				8th	
Warsaw Cup			7th	8th	
International: Junior
Junior Worlds		23rd			
Youth Olympics		8th			
JGP Austria		12th			
JGP France	22nd				
JGP Latvia		10th			
JGP U.K.	9th				
JGP U.S.			12th		
EYOF	14th				
National
Swiss Champ.	4th	7th	1st	3rd	
WD = Withdrew
