= Kimena Brog-Meier =

Swiss figure skater

Kimena Brog Meier
Personal information
- Born: 20 February 1987 (age 39) Zürich, Switzerland
- Height: 1.69 m (5 ft 6 1/2 in)

Figure skating career
- Country: Switzerland
- Began skating: 1994
- Retired: 2005

Medal record
Swiss Championships
Gold medal – first place	2002 Zurich	Singles
Silver medal – second place	2003 Zug	Singles
Silver medal – second place	2005 Lausanne	Singles

Kimena Brog-Meier (born 20 February 1987) is a Swiss former competitive figure skater. She is the 2002 Swiss national champion and won a silver medal on the ISU Junior Grand Prix. She qualified to the free skate at three ISU Championships – 2001 Junior Worlds in Sofia, Bulgaria; 2002 Junior Worlds in Hamar, Norway; and 2003 Europeans in Malmö, Sweden.

== Programs ==
Season	Short program	Free skating
2005–2006	Good Bye Lenin! by Yann Tiersen	La Ballade d'Annabelle et Johnnie by Joe Hisaishi
2002–2003	Amélie by Yann Tiersen	Dolphins by Marcel Barsotti
2001–2002	Amélie by Yann Tiersen	Flipper by Joel McNeely
2000–2001	The Road to Wellville by R. Portman	Xotica by René Dupéré

== Results ==
International
Event	99–00	00–01	01–02	02–03	04–05
European Champ.				22nd	
International: Junior
World Junior Champ.		24th	18th		
JGP Germany		9th			
JGP Italy			2nd		
JGP Netherlands			4th		
JGP Norway		7th			
National
Swiss Champ.	2nd	2nd	1st		2nd
