= Timothy Leemann =

Swiss figure skater

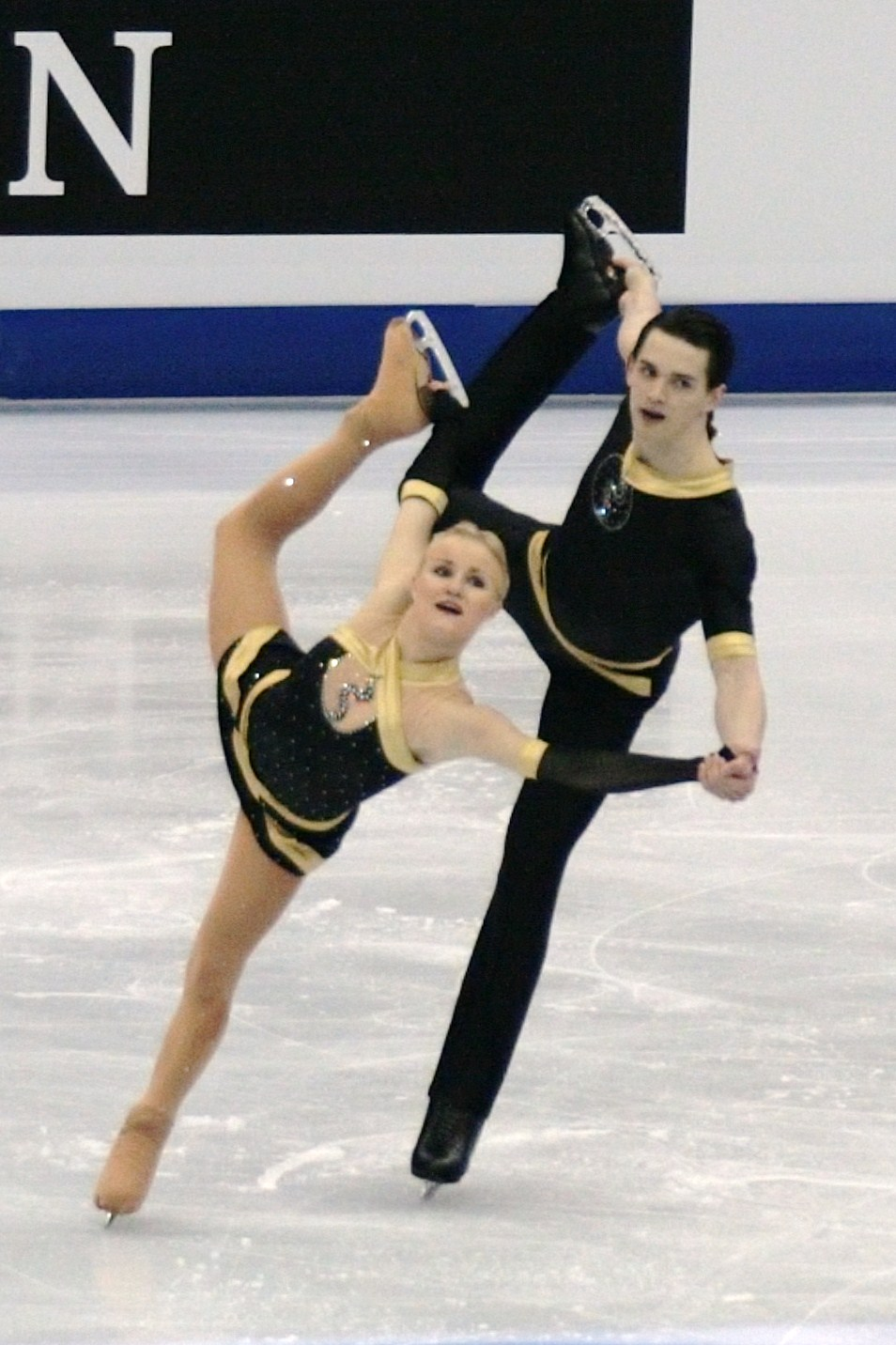

Personal information
- Full name: Timothy Leemann
- Born: 22 April 1991 (age 35) Zurich
- Home town: Zurich
- Height: 1.83 m (6 ft 0 in)

Figure skating career
- Country: Switzerland
- Skating club: EC Küsnacht
- Began skating: 2000
- Retired: 2012

Medal record
Swiss Championships
Gold medal – first place	2011 Zug	Pairs
Gold medal – first place	2012 Basel	Pairs

Timothy Leemann (born 22 April 1991) is a Swiss former competitive figure skater. Competing in pair skating with partner Anaïs Morand, he is the 2011–2012 Swiss national champion. In July 2012, it was reported that their partnership had ended. Leemann also competed in single skating.

== Programs ==
=== Pair skating with Morand ===
Season	Short program	Free skating
2011–2012	Eclipse (from Cirque du Soleil)	Drum and Techno Mix by Safri Duo
2010–2011	James Bond (soundtrack)	Drum and Techno Mix by Safri Duo

=== Single skating ===
Season	Short program	Free skating
2009–2010	James Brown medley	Michael Jackson medley
2008–2009	Insomnia (remix) by Faithless	Michael Jackson medley

== Competitive highlights ==
=== Pair skating with Morand ===
Results
International
Event	2010–2011	2011–2012
Worlds		18th
Europeans		14th
International: Junior
Junior Worlds	12th	
JGP Austria		13th
Bavarian Open		2nd J.
National
Swiss Champ.	1st	1st
JGP = Junior Grand Prix; J. = Junior level

=== Single skating ===
Results
International
Event	2007–2008	2008–2009	2009–2010
JGP France		14th	
JGP Mexico		10th	
JGP Turkey			15th
Cup of Nice		8th J.	
Golden Bear	4th J.		
Ice Challenge			3rd J.
Merano Cup	5th J.		
National
Swiss Champ.		6th	9th
JGP = Junior Grand Prix; J. = Junior level
