= Noah Scherer =

Swiss pair skater

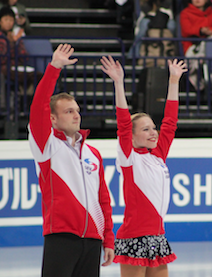
- Chtchetinina and Scherer in 2017

Personal information
- Born: 5 October 1992 (age 34) Flühli, Switzerland
- Height: 1.73 m (5 ft 8 in)

Figure skating career
- Country: Switzerland
- Coach: Jean-François Ballester
- Skating club: EC St. Jakob Basel
- Began skating: 2000

Medal record
Swiss Championships
Gold medal – first place	2014 La Chaux-de-Fonds	Pairs
Gold medal – first place	2017 Lucerne	Pairs
Silver medal – second place	2016 Lausanne	Pairs

Noah Scherer (born 5 October 1992) is a Swiss pair skater. With Ioulia Chtchetinina, he won three international medals and competed at two World Championships. In mid-May 2017, the Swiss skating federation announced that they had parted ways.

== Programs ==
=== Pair skating with Ioulia Chtchetinina ===
Season	Short program	Free skating
2016–2017	L'Usine by The Architect	My Immortal by Evanescence
2015–2016	Feeling Good performed by Michael Bublé	Skyfall by Adele

=== Single skating ===
Season	Short program	Free skating
2011–2012	Epitath of Twilight	Das Modell by Kraftwerk; The Grindhouse Blues; Roy's Toy Interpret
2010–2011	Epitath of Twilight	Kill Bill

== Competitive highlights ==
=== Pair skating with Ioulia Chtchetinina ===
Competition placements at senior level
Season	2015–16	2016–17
World Championships	18th	28th
European Championships		17th
Swiss Championships	2nd	1st
CS Finlandia Trophy		9th
CS Nebelhorn Trophy		7th
CS Ondrej Nepela Trophy	9th	
CS Warsaw Cup	6th	
Bavarian Open	5th	1st
Cup of Nice	5th	
Hellmut Seibt Memorial	3rd	
NRW Trophy		3rd

=== Pairs with Habechian ===
National
Event	2013–14
Swiss Championships	1st

=== Single skating ===
International
Event	07–08	08–09	09–10	10–11	11–12	14–15
Merano Cup					9th	
Printemps					12th	
International: Junior
JGP Austria				14th		
JGP France		19th		7th		
JGP Italy					9th	
JGP Spain		24th				
EYOF		14th				
Merano Cup	3rd J		4th J			
National
Swiss Champ.			8th	6th	7th	4th
