= Rüdi Johner =

Swiss pair skater

Personal information
- Born: 1 August 1942 (age 83)

Figure skating career
- Country: Switzerland
Medal record
Representing Switzerland
Pairs' Figure skating
European Championships
| Silver medal – second place | 1965 Moscow | Pairs |

Rüdi Johner (born 1 August 1942) is a Swiss former pair skater. Competing with Gerda Johner, he was a nine-time gold medalists at the Swiss Figure Skating Championships from 1957 to 1965. The pair finished sixth at the 1964 Winter Olympics, and the following year, they won the silver medal at the European Figure Skating Championships and finished fourth at the World Figure Skating Championships.

== Results ==
(pairs with Gerda Johner)

International
| Event | 1957 | 1958 | 1959 | 1960 | 1961 | 1962 | 1963 | 1964 | 1965 |
|---|---|---|---|---|---|---|---|---|---|
| Winter Olympics | | | | | | | | 5th | |
| World Championships | | | | | | 7th | 6th | | 4th |
| European Champ. | | | 11th | 9th | 8th | 4th | 6th | 5th | 2nd |
National
| Swiss Championships | 1st | 1st | 1st | 1st | 1st | 1st | 1st | 1st | 1st |
