= Hans Kuster =

Swiss figure skater

Personal information
- Full name: Hans Alfred Kuster
- Nationality: Swiss
- Born: 5 June 1920; Basel, Switzerland

Sport
- Sport: Figure skating

Hans Kuster (born 5 June 1920, date of death unknown) was a Swiss figure skater. He competed in the pairs event at the 1948 Winter Olympics.

Kuster married fellow Swiss figure skater and Olympian Luny Unold.
