= Oliver Höner =

Swiss figure skater (born 1966)

Personal information
- Born: 18 September 1966 (age 59)
- Height: 1.72 m (5 ft 8 in)

Figure skating career
- Country: Switzerland
- Skating club: EC Zürich
- Retired: c. 1991

Oliver Höner (born 18 September 1966) is a Swiss figure skating coach and former competitor. As a member of EC Zürich, he became an eleven-time Swiss national champion (1979, 1980, 1982, 1984–1991) and placed in the top ten at five ISU Championships – four Europeans and the 1989 Worlds in Paris. His best result was a sixth-place finish at the 1990 Europeans in Leningrad. He also represented Switzerland at the 1988 Winter Olympics in Calgary, finishing 12th.

In 1995, Höner founded the Art on Ice ice show. He has also worked as a coach, and his former students include Lucinda Ruh, Martine Adank, and Viviane Käser.

Höner's older brother Daniel is also a Swiss national champ, having won the title seven times.

== Results ==
International
Event	78–79	79–80	80–81	81–82	82–83	83–84	84–85	85–86	86–87	87–88	88–89	89–90	90–91
Olympics										12th			
Worlds							19th	14th	14th	12th	8th	13th	13th
Europeans				13th		16th	WD	14th	9th	8th		6th	9th
Skate America									11th				14th
Skate Canada													7th
Nations Cup													6th
Inter. de Paris										4th	7th		
NHK Trophy										8th			
National
Swiss Champ.	1st	1st		1st		1st	1st	1st	1st	1st	1st	1st	1st
WD: Withdrew
