= Nora von Bergen =

Swiss ice dancer

Nora von Bergen (born April 19, 1990, in Münsingen, Canton of Bern) is a former Swiss ice dancer and actress. She competed with her first partner from 2001 to 2006. She teamed up with David DeFazio in 2006. They are the 2007 Swiss national champions. Von Bergen and Defazio ended their partnership after one year.

After her skating career, she decided to study acting in Switzerland at the drama school SAMTS in Adliswil. In 2021, the first web series "CTRL ALL DEL" (produced by the Zurich University of the Arts) with her as a performer appeared. Among others, the Swiss actors Reto Stalder and Sandro Stocker acted there.

== Filmography ==
Year	Film	Name	Director
2021	CTRL ALL DEL - Series	Nora	Lucie Bachmann
