= David DeFazio =

American-Swiss figure skater (born 1983)

David “Bones” DeFazio (born July 19, 1983 in Red Bank, New Jersey, U.S.) is an American-born ice dancer, who represented Switzerland in international competition. He previously represented Canada. He competed with Laura Csumrik and Ariane Morin, both representing Canada. He teamed up with Switzerland's Nora von Bergen in 2006. Von Bergen and DeFazio are the 2007 Swiss national champions. They split up after the 2007 European Championships. He went on to compete internationally representing Switzerland with Solene Pasztory and retired from competition in 2009.

DeFazio holds a master's degree in Sustainable Peace through Sport from the International University of Monaco and the United Nations-mandated University for Peace. He teaches figure skating and ice dance in Upstate New York.
