= Monika Zingg =

Swiss figure skater

Personal information
- Nationality: Swiss
- Born: 11 March 1943 (age 82); Zürich, Switzerland

Sport
- Sport: Figure skating

Monika Zingg (born 11 March 1943) is a Swiss figure skater. She competed in the ladies' singles event at the 1964 Winter Olympics.
