= Doris Blanc =

Swiss figure skater

Personal information
- Nationality: Swiss
- Born: 7 November 1926
- Died: 2010 (aged 83–84)

Sport
- Sport: Figure skating

Doris Blanc (7 November 1926 – 2010) was a Swiss figure skater. She competed in the ladies' singles event at the 1948 Winter Olympics.
