= Alfred Mégroz =

Swiss figure skater

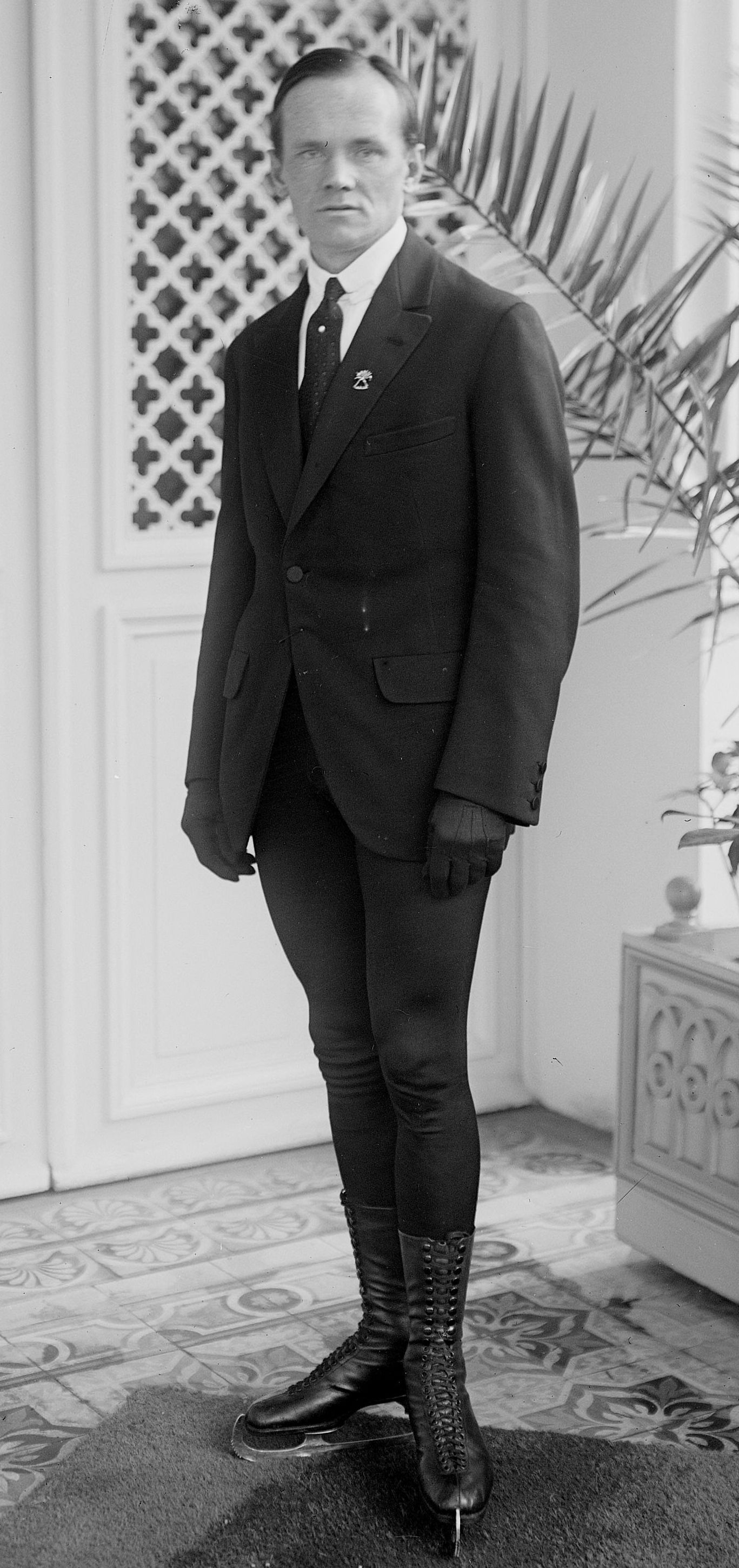
- Alfred Mégroz in 1919

Personal information
- Born: 13 March 1883
- Died: 30 June 1956 (aged 73) Pregny-Chambésy, Switzerland

Sport
- Sport: Figure skating
- Club: CdP Lausanne

Alfred Mégroz (13 March 1883 – 30 June 1956) was a Swiss figure skater. He competed in the singles at the 1920 Summer Olympics and finished eighth.
