= Luny Unold =

Swiss figure skater

Personal information
- Full name: Karoline Helene Unold
- Nationality: Swiss
- Born: 30 June 1920; Basel, Switzerland
- Died: 15 October 2010 (aged 90); Basel, Switzerland

Sport
- Sport: Figure skating

Luny Unold (30 June 1920 – 15 October 2010) was a Swiss figure skater. She competed in the pairs event at the 1948 Winter Olympics.

Unold married fellow Swiss figure skater and Olympian Hans Kuster.
