= Daniel Höner =

Swiss figure skater

Personal information
- Born: 16 May 1953 (age 73)

Figure skating career
- Country: Switzerland
- Skating club: EC Zürich
- Retired: c. 1973

Daniel Höner (born 16 May 1953) is a Swiss former competitive figure skater. Representing EC Zürich, he won seven consecutive Swiss national titles from 1967 to 1973. He placed in the top ten at three European Championships – in 1970 (Leningrad), 1972 (Gothenburg), and 1973 (Cologne). His best world result, 11th, came at the 1973 World Championships in Bratislava.

Höner coaches at Eissport Club Zürich-Oerlikon.

Höner's younger brother Oliver is also a Swiss national champion, having won the title eleven times.

== Competitive highlights ==
International
Event	66–67	67–68	68–69	69–70	70–71	71–72	72–73
Worlds	20th	20th		WD	15th		11th
Europeans	17th	19th	15th	10th	11th	9th	9th
Prague Skate						3rd	6th
National
Swiss Champ.	1st	1st	1st	1st	1st	1st	1st
WD = Withdrew
