= Sandy Hoffmann =

German figure skater

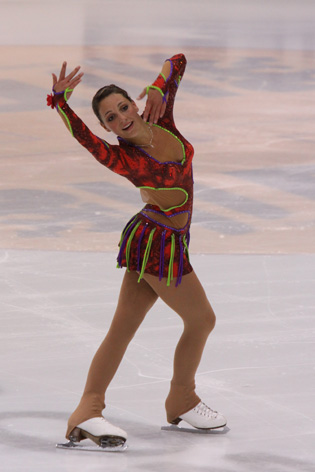
- Hoffmann at the Junior Grand Prix in Dresden (2009)

Personal information
- Born: 16 April 1993 (age 33) Freital, Germany
- Height: 1.66 m (5 ft 5 in)

Figure skating career
- Country: Germany
- Discipline: Women's singles
- Coach: Niels Koepp, Ilona Schindler
- Skating club: DEC Dresden
- Began skating: 1996

Sandy Hoffmann (born 16 April 1993) is a German former competitive figure skater. She has one senior international medal, bronze at the 2012 Warsaw Cup, and is the 2013 German national bronze medalist.

== Career ==
Hoffmann was coached by Evelyn Gutzeit until early summer 2008, when Gutzeit retired from coaching. Since then, she is coached by Ilona Schindler and Ingrid Lehmann, former coaches of Simone Koch, in Dresden and Chemnitz, Germany.

Hoffmann won junior titles at the Bavarian Open and the Heiko Fischer Pokal. She made her Junior Grand Prix debut at the 2008–2009 ISU Junior Grand Prix event in Ostrava, Czech Republic, where she placed 5th and set her personal best. During this competition, she was coached by Ilona Schindler.

Hoffmann made her international senior debut at the 2008 NRW Trophy in Dortmund and her national senior debut at the 2009 German Championships in Oberstdorf.

== Programs ==
Season	Short program	Free skating
2011–2012	Dance I by Asi Baila el Tango; Shall We Dance Tango	Cirque du Soleil
2009–2010	La califfa by Ennio Morricone	Cirque du Soleil

== Competitive highlights ==
CS: Challenger Series; JGP: Junior Grand Prix

International
Event	07–08	08–09	09–10	10–11	11–12	12–13	13–14	14–15
CS Ice Challenge								12th
Bavarian Open				8th		10th		
Challenge Cup					23rd			
Cup of Nice			12th		28th		23rd	14th
Ice Challenge						4th		
Merano Cup							6th	
Nepela Trophy							17th	
New Year's Cup						6th		
NRW Trophy		7th	9th		25th		6th	
Warsaw Cup						3rd		
U.S. Classic							6th	
International: Junior and novice
JGP Czech Rep.		5th						
JGP Germany			4th					
JGP Italy					14th			
JGP U.K.		7th						
JGP U.S.			14th					
Bavarian Open	1st J							
EYOF		4th J						
Golden Bear	5th J							
Fischer Pokal	1st J		2nd					
National
German Champ.	4th J	9th	6th		4th	3rd	4th	
