= Tikhomirov =

Tikhomirov may refer to:

- Tikhomirov (crater), a crater on the Moon
- Tikhomirov Scientific Research Institute of Instrument Design
- Tikhomirov (surname), people with the surname Tikhomirov
