= Inge Wischnewski =

German figure skater and coach

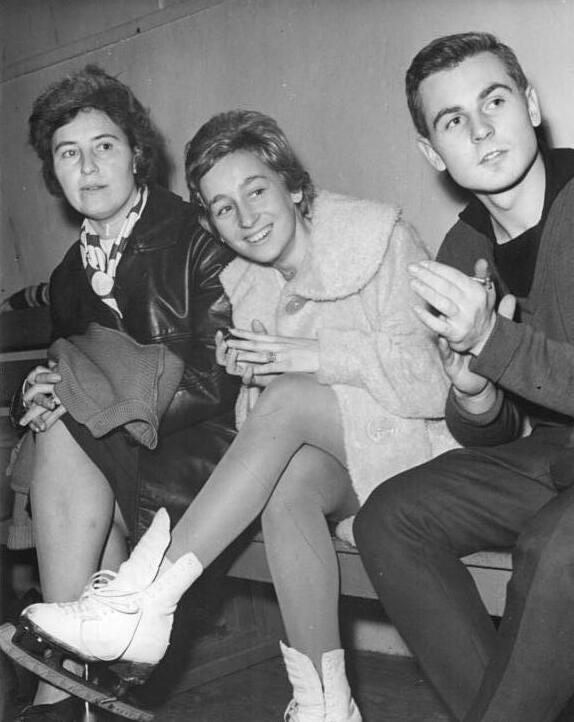
- Wischnewski (left) in December 1962, with Heidemarie Steiner and Ralph Borghard

Personal information
- Other names: Inge Kabisch (birth)
- Born: 2 March 1930 Weißenfels, Province of Saxony, Weimar Republic
- Died: 11 July 2010 (aged 80)

Figure skating career
- Country: East Germany
- Retired: 1955

Inge Wischnewski, née Kabisch, (2 March 1930 – 11 July 2010) was a German figure skater and figure skating coach. She was a four-time East German national champion.

== Career ==
Inge Kabisch won the East German national title four times, always beating Jutta Müller. Her strength were spins. She was coached by Charlotte Giebelmann.

In 1956, Manfred Ewald sent her and other skaters to study coaching at the DHfK Leipzig. She settled in East Berlin where she worked as a coach under her married name, Inge Wischnewski. Her students included:

- Christine Errath (1974 World champion and 1976 Olympic bronze medalist)
- Janina Wirth (1982 World Junior champion)
- Uwe Kagelmann (1972 and 1976 Olympic pairs' bronze medalist)
- Rolf Österreich (1976 Olympic pairs' silver medalist)
- Alexander König (1982 World Junior men's bronze medalist and 1988 European pairs' bronze medalist)
- Ralph Borghard
- Heidemarie Steiner
- Bernd Wunderlich (1975 East German national champion)
- Kerstin Stolfig

Wischnewski coached in Norway from 1991 to 1996, after which she returned to Berlin. Her former student, Christine Errath, wrote a book about her titled Die Pirouettenkönigin (The Spin Queen).

== Personal life ==
Inge Kabisch was born on 2 March 1930 in Weißenfels, Weimar Republic. She married Heinz Wischnewski and took his surname. In 1958, she gave birth to their daughter, Ina. She died in July 2010 after a short illness.

== Results ==
National
| Event | 1952 | 1953 | 1954 | 1955 |
|---|---|---|---|---|
| East German Championships | 1st | 1st | 1st | 1st |
