= Liebers =

Liebers is a German language surname. Notable people with the name include:

- Mario Liebers (born 1960), German former competitive figure skater
- Martin Liebers (born 1985), German former competitive figure skater
- Matthias Liebers (born 1958), former German footballer
- Peter Liebers (born 1988), German former figure skater.
