= Tikhomirov (surname) =

Tikhomirov (Russian: Тихомиров, female Tikhomirova (Тихомирова)) is a Russian surname. People with the name include:

- Aleksandr Tikhomirov (Aleksandr Andreyevich Tikhomirov, 1850–1931, Russian zoologist
- Alexander Tikhomirov (Alexander Konstantinovich Tikhomirov, born 1947), Russian skater
- Dmitriy Tikhomirov (born 1999), Belarusian footballer
- Igor Tikhomirov (fencer) (born 1963), a Canadian (formerly Soviet) fencer
- Igor Tikhomirov (musician) (born 1961), member of Kino
- Ioasaf Tikhomirov (1872–1908), Russian actor
- Lev Tikhomirov (1852–1923), Russian revolutionary
- Mikhail Tikhomirov (1893—1965), Soviet paleographer
- Nikolai Tikhomirov (1857–1900), Russian engineer
- Nikolai Tikhomirov (chemical engineer) (1859–1930), Russian and rocket pioneer
- Vasily Tikhomirov (1876–1956), Russian and Soviet dancer and choreographer
- Viktor Tikhomirov (1912–1985), Soviet scientist
- Vladimir Tikhomirov (1915–1994), Soviet geologist and historian of science
- Sergius Tikhomirov (1871–1945), bishop of the Orthodox Eastern Church
