= Janina Wirth =

German figure skater

Personal information
- Other names: Janina Weiß (married)
- Born: 1966 (age 59–60)

Figure skating career
- Country: East Germany

Janina Wirth (later surname: Weiß, born in 1966) is a former competitive figure skater for East Germany. She is the 1982 World Junior champion. Wirth was coached by Inge Wischnewski and represented SC Dynamo Berlin.

== Results ==
International
Event	1979–80	1980–81	1981–82	1982–83	1983–84
World Championships			12th	11th	
European Championships			9th	8th	
Blue Swords		3rd		1st	1st
Prize of Moscow News		2nd		4th	
Richmond Trophy		2nd			
International: Junior
World Junior Championships			1st		
Grand Prize SNP	3rd				
National
East German Championships	6th		2nd	2nd	6th
