= Tatiana Sharanova =

Russian pair skater (born 1946)

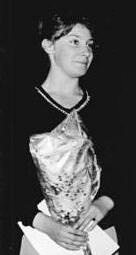
- Sharanova in 1962

Personal information
- Native name: Татьяна Александровна Шаранова
- Full name: Tatiana Alexandrovna Sharanova
- Born: 28 November 1946 (age 79) Moscow, Russian SFSR, Soviet Union

Figure skating career
- Country: Soviet Union
- Partner: Anatoli Evdokimov; Aleksandr Gorelik
- Coach: Elena Vasilieva
- Retired: 1970s

Tatiana Alexandrovna Sharanova (Russian: Татьяна Александровна Шаранова; born 28 November 1946) is a Russian former pair skater who represented the Soviet Union in the 1960s and early 1970s. Competing in partnership with Aleksandr Gorelik, she won bronze at the 1962 Blue Swords and placed 7th at the 1964 European Championships in Grenoble, France.

Sharanova's partnership with her husband, Anatoli Evdokimov, began by 1966. The two finished 5th at the 1967 European Championships in Ljubljana, Yugoslavia, and 8th at the 1967 World Championships in Vienna, Austria. They won silver at the 1966 Prize of Moscow News, gold at the 1967 Prague Skate, and silver at the 1970 Blue Swords.

After retiring from competition, Sharanova worked for an ice ballet based in Kiev, Ukraine.

== Competitive highlights ==
=== With Evdokimov ===
International
Event	66–67	67–68	68–69	69–70	70–71
World Championships	8th				
European Championships	5th				
Blue Swords					2nd
Prague Skate		1st			
Prize of Moscow News	2nd			3rd	4th
Winter Universiade		2nd			
National
Soviet Championships	3rd		5th		5th

=== With Gorelik ===
International
Event	1961–62	1962–63	1963–64
World Championships			15th
European Championships			7th
Blue Swords		3rd	
National
Soviet Championships	3rd	6th	2nd
