= Natalia Gudina =

Israeli ice dancer

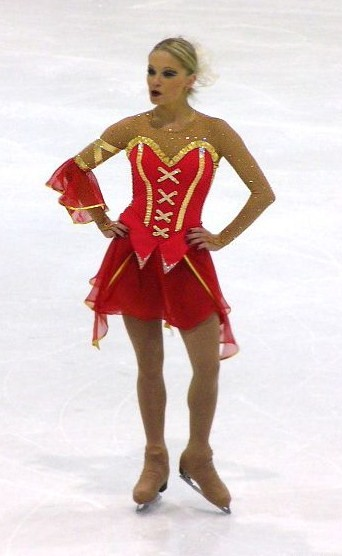
- Gudina in 2004

Personal information
- Native name: Наталія Гудина
- Born: 11 November 1977 (age 48) Odesa, Ukrainian SSR
- Height: 1.60 m (5 ft 3 in)

Figure skating career
- Country: Israel
- Partner: Alexei Beletski
- Skating club: Canada Centre Metulla
- Began skating: 1981
- Retired: 2005

Natalia Gudina (Ukrainian: Наталія Гудина, Russian: Наталья Гудина, Hebrew: נטליה גודינה; born 11 November 1977) is an Israeli former competitive ice dancer. Representing Israel with husband Alexei Beletski, she placed as high as 14th at the World Championships, as high as 9th at the European Championships, and competed at the Winter Olympics. She represented Ukraine with her previous partner, Vitali Kurkudym, and won the 1996 World Junior bronze medal.

== Career ==
Gudina began skating at the age of four. Early in her career, she competed with partner Vitali Kurkudym for Ukraine. They were coached by Alexandr Tumanovsky and Maria Tumanovskaya. Gudina/Kurkudym won the bronze medal at the 1996 World Junior Championships. Their partnership ended in 1998.

Later in 1998, Gudina teamed up with Alexei Beletski. They competed together for Ukraine until the end of 1998/1999 season, after which they switched to competing for Israel. Gudina and Beletski are the 2000–2005 Israeli national silver medalists and placed 19th at the 2002 Winter Olympics. They were coached by Gennadi Karponosov and Natalia Linichuk.

== Personal life ==
Gudina and Beletski married in 1999.

== Programs ==
=== With Beletski ===
Season	Original dance	Free dance	Exhibition
2004–2005	Charleston; Slow Foxtrot; Quickstep	Cats by Andrew Lloyd Webber	
2003–2004	Boogie Woogie; Blues; Rock'n'Roll	Barber of Seville by Gioachino Rossini	
2002–2003	Waltz: The Drinking Song (from La traviata) by Giuseppe Verdi; Galop: Petersburger Galop by Strauss	Notre-Dame de Paris by Luc Plamondon, Riccardo Cocciante	While My Guitar Gently Weeps
2001–2002	Tango: El Choclo by Ángel Villoldo performed by Caterina Valente; Flamenco	Sirtaki performed by André Rieu; Agapi performed by Nana Mouskouri; Sirtaki	
2000–2001	Charleston from Cabaret; Foxtrot from Cabaret; Quickstep: Money Makes the World Go Round (from Cabaret) by John Kander	Blues from Blues Brothers 2000; Blues by Prince; Boogie from Blues Brothers 2000	

=== With Kurkudym ===
Season	Original dance	Free dance
1996–1997		Sway; Besame Mucho

== Competitive highlights ==
=== With Beletski ===
Results
International
Event	1998–99	1999–00	2000–01	2001–02	2002–03	2003–04	2004–05
Olympics				19th			
Worlds			25th		14th	15th	18th
Europeans			17th	15th	11th	9th	13th
GP Bofrost Cup					5th		
GP Cup of China						6th	
GP Cup of Russia							6th
GP Lalique					5th		
GP NHK Trophy							6th
GP Skate America						7th	
Golden Spin		3rd	6th	7th			
Karl Schäfer					3rd		
Helena Pajovic				1st			
Skate Israel	6th	5th	5th			2nd	
National
Israeli Champ.		2nd	2nd	2nd	2nd	2nd	2nd
Ukrainian Champ.	4th						
GP = Grand Prix

=== With Kurkudym ===
Results
International
Event	1994–95	1995–96	1996–97	1997–98
European Champ.			18th	
Nebelhorn Trophy			4th	
PFSA Trophy				2nd
International: Junior
World Junior Champ.	12th	3rd	4th	
Blue Swords	4th J.	3rd J.		
EYOF	5th J.			
Ukrainian Souvenir	6th J.	1st J.		
National
Ukrainian Champ.			2nd	3rd
J. = Junior level
