= Inna Volyanskaya =

Russian pair skater (1965–2025)

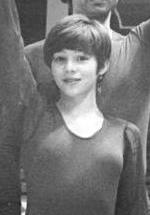
- Volyanskaya at the 1980 Blue Swords

Personal information
- Native name: Инна Волянская
- Born: 5 July 1965 Moscow, Russian SFSR, Soviet Union
- Died: 29 January 2025 (aged 59) Washington, D.C., U.S.
- Cause of death: Mid-air collision

Figure skating career
- Country: Soviet Union
- Partner: Valery Spiridonov
- Coach: Tatiana Tarasova
- Retired: 1983

Inna Volyanskaya (Russian: Инна Витальевна Волянская; 5 July 1965 – 29 January 2025) was a Russian pair skater who competed for the Soviet Union. With Valery Spiridonov, she won six international medals, including gold at the 1982 Nebelhorn Trophy.

== Career ==
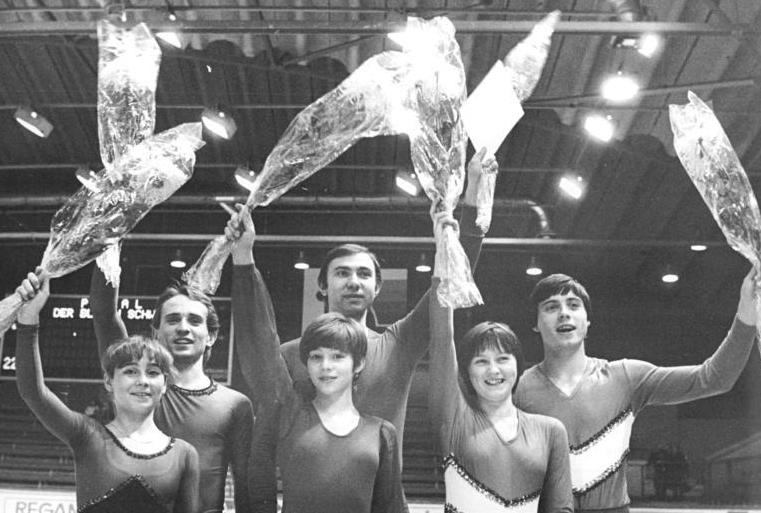
Volyanskaya/Spiridonov (centre) at the 1980 Blue Swords

Volyanskaya/Spiridonov won silver at the 1980 St. Ivel International, gold at the 1980 Blue Swords, silver at the 1981 Prague Skate, gold at the 1982 Grand Prix International St. Gervais, and gold at the 1982 Nebelhorn Trophy. After retiring from competition, they skated together in ice shows, including Torvill & Dean and the Russian Allstars.

From 2017 until her death in 2025, Volyanskaya worked as a skating coach at the Ashburn Ice House in Ashburn, Virginia, United States.

== Personal life and death ==
Volyanskaya was born on 5 July 1965. She was at one-time married to Spiridonov, and was at the time of her death married to Jeremy Wilson. Volyanskaya also had a daughter, Maria, whose godmother was Volyanskaya's former coach, Tatiana Tarasova.

On 29 January 2025, Volyanskaya died when the passenger jet she was onboard collided with an U.S. Army helicopter above the Potomac River in Washington, D.C., leaving no survivors. She was 59. On March 2, 2025, U.S. Figure Skating held the ice show Legacy on Ice, which paid tribute to Volyanskaya and the other victims that were killed aboard American Eagle Flight 5342. Volyanskaya's former students paid tribute to their coach by skating to "You'll Be in My Heart" by Phil Collins.

== Competitive highlights ==
with Spiridonov

International
Event	1979–80	1980–81	1981–82	1982–83
Blue Swords		1st		2nd
Nebelhorn Trophy				1st
NHK Trophy			4th	
Prague Skate			2nd	
St. Gervais International				1st
St. Ivel International		2nd		
National
Soviet Championships	3rd	6th	4th	
