= Christine Errath =

German figure skater

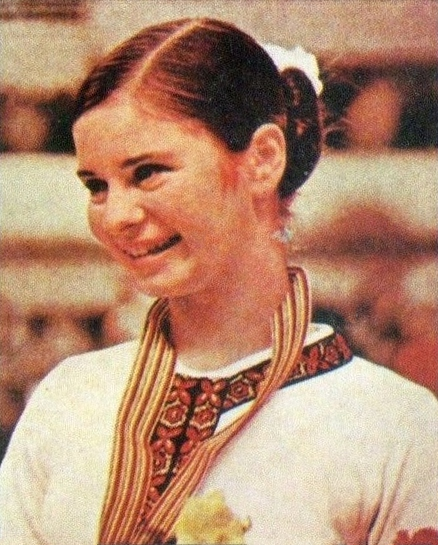
- Christine Errath c. 1974

Personal information
- Full name: Christine Stüber-Errath
- Born: 29 December 1956 (age 69) East Berlin, East Germany
- Height: 158 cm (5 ft 2 in)

Figure skating career
- Country: East Germany
- Retired: 1976
Medal record
Representing East Germany
Ladies' figure skating
Olympic Games
Bronze medal – third place	1976 Innsbruck	Ladies' singles
World Championships
Silver medal – second place	1976 Gothenburg	Ladies' singles
Bronze medal – third place	1975 Colorado Springs	Ladies' singles
Gold medal – first place	1974 Munich	Ladies' singles
Bronze medal – third place	1973 Prague	Ladies' singles
European Championships
Bronze medal – third place	1976 Geneva	Ladies' singles
Gold medal – first place	1975 Copenhagen	Ladies' singles
Gold medal – first place	1974 Zagreb	Ladies' singles
Gold medal – first place	1973 Cologne	Ladies' singles

Christine Errath (later Trettin then Stüber, born 29 December 1956) is a German former figure skater who represented East Germany in competition. She is the 1976 Olympic bronze medalist, the 1974 World champion, and a three-time European champion.

== Career ==
Coached by Inge Wischnewski, Errath trained at SC Dynamo Berlin and competed for East Germany.

Being especially strong in free skating, Errath benefited from the reduction in value of compulsory figures introduced in 1972. She retired from amateur competition in 1976 having represented East Germany at two Winter Olympics. She became World champion in 1974 and a three-time European champion between 1973 and 1975.

Until 1973, Errath's chief rival was Sonja Morgenstern, an East German coached by Jutta Müller. In 1976, her main rival was Anett Pötzsch, also coached by Müller. Errath took bronze at the 1976 European Championships and at the 1976 Winter Olympics. She retired after winning the silver medal at the 1976 World Championships.

== Personal life ==
Errath was formerly married to Ulrich Trettin, a former East German tennis champion, with whom she has two children, Jenny and Marcus. In 2006, she remarried, to orthodontist Paul Stüber, and is now known as Christine Stüber-Errath.

Errath currently works for the German TV station MDR, which produces programs in the German states of Saxony, Thuringia, and Saxony-Anhalt. She hosts the show "Außenseiter Spitzenreiter" ("Top model Outsider") with Hans-Joachim Wolfram (creator of the Dynamo Dresden hymn "Dynamo Fever"). In 2010, she published her book Die Pirouettenkönigin (Pirouette Queen).

== Results ==
International
Event	1968–69	1969–70	1970–71	1971–72	1972–73	1973–74	1974–75	1975–76
Winter Olympics				8th				3rd
World Champ.			9th	10th	3rd	1st	3rd	2nd
European Champ.	18th		7th	5th	1st	1st	1st	3rd
Richmond Trophy				1st				
Blue Swords	3rd	3rd	2nd	1st	1st	1st	1st	1st
Prize of Moscow News	5th							
National
East German Champ.	3rd	3rd	2nd	2nd	2nd	1st	1st	
