= Inga Gauter =

German figure skater

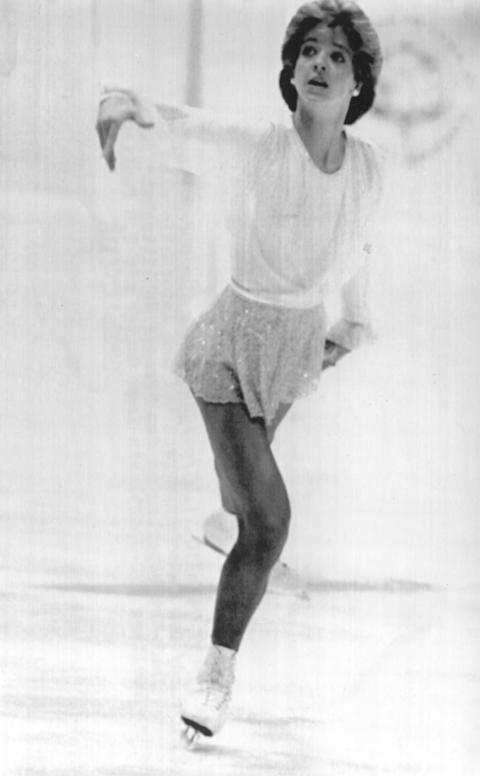
- Gauter at the Prague Skate in November 1985

Personal information
- Born: 7 December 1970 (age 55) East Germany

Figure skating career
- Country: East Germany

Inga Gauter (born 7 December 1970) is a former competitive figure skater who represented East Germany in single skating. She won gold at the 1984 Blue Swords, gold at the 1985 Prague Skate, and bronze at the 1986 St. Ivel International. Her skating club was TSC Berlin.

== Competitive highlights ==
International
Event	1984–85	1985–86	1986–87
Prague Skate		1st	
St. Ivel International			3rd
International: Junior
World Junior Champ.		4th	6th
Blue Swords	1st	2nd	1st
National
East German Champ.			2nd
