= Manuela Groß =

German former competitive pair skater (born 1957)

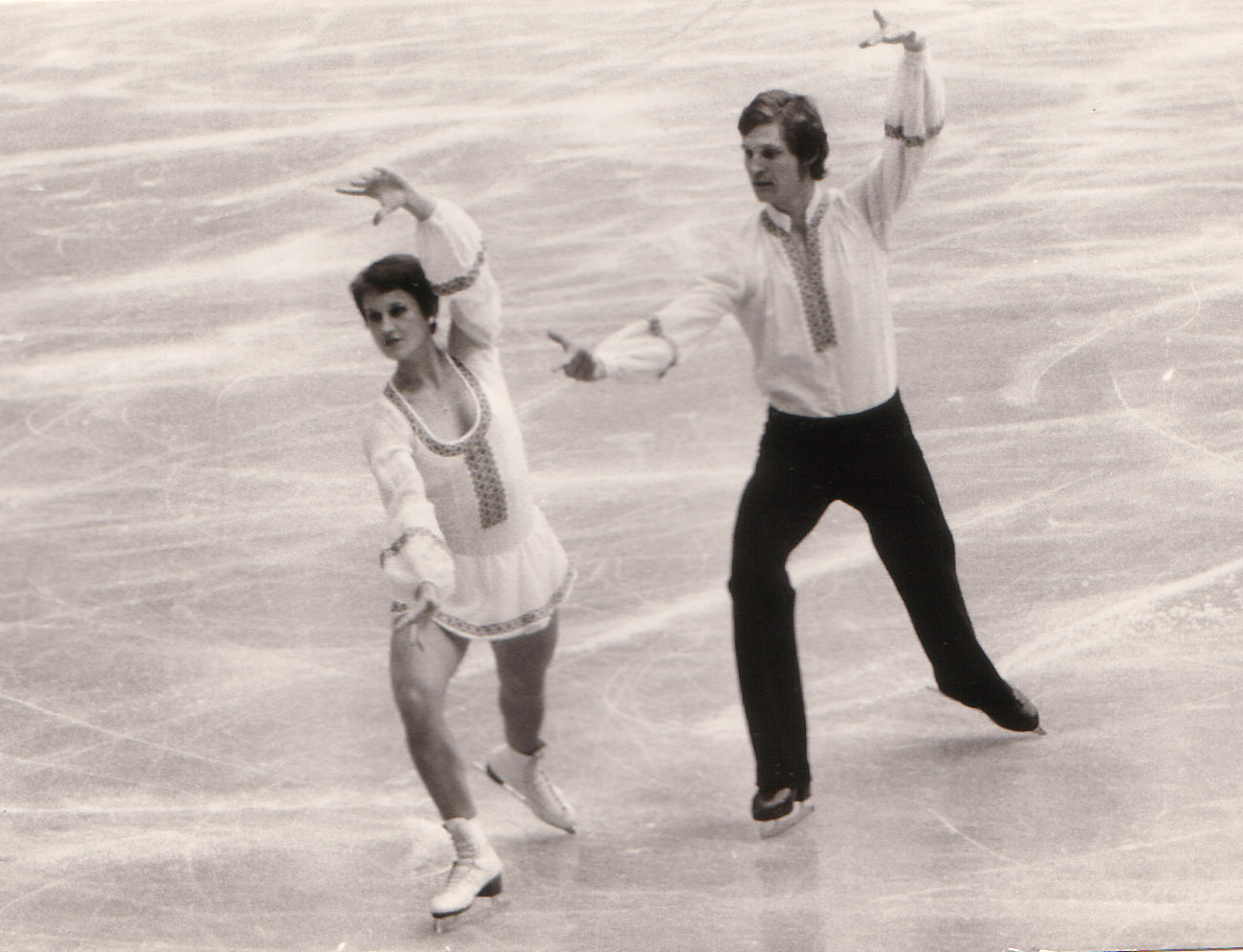
- Manuela Groß and Uwe Kagelmann at the ISU-Show 1976 in Berlin

Personal information
- Born: 29 January 1957 (age 69) East Berlin, East Germany

Figure skating career
- Country: East Germany
- Skating club: SC Dynamo Berlin
- Retired: 1976
Medal record
Representing East Germany
Pairs' Figure skating
Olympic Games
| Bronze medal – third place | 1976 Innsbruck | Pairs |
| Bronze medal – third place | 1972 Sapporo | Pairs |
World Championships
| Bronze medal – third place | 1975 Colorado Springs | Pairs |
| Bronze medal – third place | 1973 Bratislava | Pairs |
European Championships
| Bronze medal – third place | 1975 Copenhagen | Pairs |
| Bronze medal – third place | 1972 Gothenburg | Pairs |

Manuela Manja Groß (later Leupold, born 29 January 1957 in East Berlin, East Germany) is a German former competitive pair skater. With partner Uwe Kagelmann, she is a two-time Olympic bronze medalist, and she is the youngest female figure skating Olympic medalist. She turned 15 just four days before the opening of the 1972 Winter Olympics, held in Sapporo, Japan, where she won her first bronze medal in pairs skating.

Groß began figure skating in Berlin. She was paired with Uwe Kagelmann. They skated for the SC Dynamo Berlin club representing East Germany. Their coach was Heinz-Friedrich Lindner.

Groß became a figure skating coach at the SC Berlin club and coaches many recreational figure skaters.

== Results ==
pairs with Kagelmann

International
| Event | 68–69 | 69–70 | 70–71 | 71–72 | 72–73 | 73–74 | 74–75 | 75–76 |
|---|---|---|---|---|---|---|---|---|
| Olympics | | | | 3rd | | | | 3rd |
| Worlds | | 7th | 4th | 4th | 3rd | 4th | 3rd | 4th |
| Europeans | 7th | 7th | 4th | 3rd | 4th | 4th | 3rd | 4th |
| Blue Swords | | 2nd | 1st | | 1st | 1st | 2nd | 1st |
National
| East Germany | 2nd | 2nd | 1st | 1st | | 1st | 2nd | 2nd |

== See also ==
- World Figure Skating Championships
