= Bernd Wunderlich (figure skater) =

German former competitive figure skater

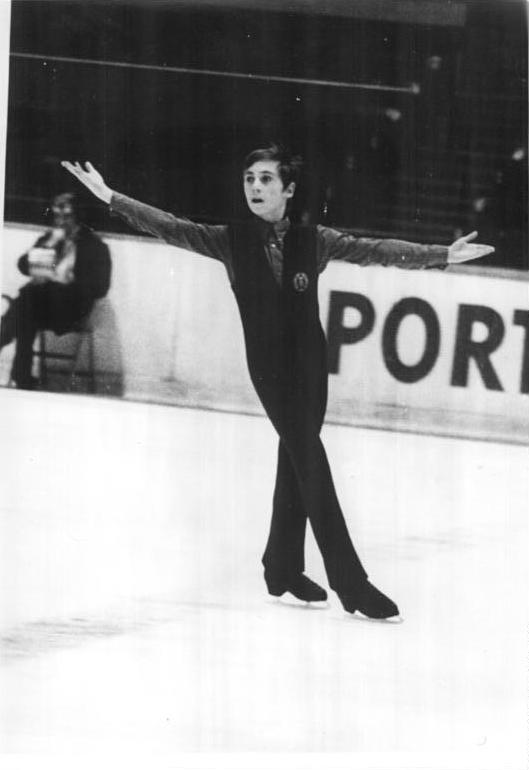
- Wunderlich at the 1972 Prague Skate

Figure skating career
- Country: East Germany
- Coach: Inge Wischnewski
- Skating club: SC Dynamo Berlin
- Retired: c. 1975

Bernd Wunderlich is a German former competitive figure skater who represented East Germany. He won the 1973 Friendship Cup in Bucharest and the 1975 East German national title. A competitor at three European Championships and three World Championships, he achieved his best result, seventh, at the 1975 Europeans in Copenhagen, Denmark. He was coached by Inge Wischnewski and represented SC Dynamo Berlin.

== Competitive highlights ==
International
Event	70–71	71–72	72–73	73–74	74–75
World Champ.			17th	13th	14th
European Champ.		11th		9th	7th
Prize of Moscow News		6th	3rd		
Prague Skate	9th		5th		5th
Blue Swords		2nd	2nd		2nd
Friendship Cup			1st		
National
East German Champ.	3rd	2nd	2nd	3rd	1st
