= Vitali Kurkudym =

Ukrainian ice dancer

Personal information
- Born: 1 November 1977 (age 48) Odessa, Ukrainian SSR, Soviet Union

Figure skating career
- Country: Ukraine
- Began skating: 1981

Vitali Kurkudym (Ukrainian: Віталій Куркудим, Russian: Виталий Куркудым, born 1 November 1977) is a Ukrainian former competitive ice dancer. With former partner Natalia Gudina, he is the 1996 World Junior bronze medalist.

== Programs ==
(with Gudina)

Season	Original dance	Free dance
1996–1997		Sway; Besame Mucho

== Competitive highlights ==
(with Gudina)

Results
International
Event	1994–95	1995–96	1996–97	1997–98
European Champ.			18th	
Nebelhorn Trophy			4th	
PFSA Trophy				2nd
International: Junior
World Junior Champ.	12th	3rd	4th	
Blue Swords	4th J.	3rd J.		
EYOF	5th J.			
Ukrainian Souvenir	6th J.	1st J.		
National
Ukrainian Champ.			2nd	3rd
J. = Junior level
