= Elena Nikonova =

Russian pair skater

Personal information
- Native name: Елена Олеговна Никонова
- Full name: Elena Olegovna Nikonova
- Other names: Prudsky; Prudskaya
- Born: 1970s Leningrad, Russian SFSR, Soviet Union

Figure skating career
- Country: Russia; Soviet Union
- Partner: Nikolai Apter
- Retired: c. 1992

Elena Olegovna Nikonova (Russian: Елена Олеговна Никонова), married surname: Prudsky, is a Russian former pair skater. With her skating partner, Nikolai Apter, she won silver at three senior international competitions – 1991 Skate America, 1991 Grand Prix International St. Gervais, and 1990 Skate Electric. As juniors, they won the gold medal at the 1988 Blue Swords.

Nikonova was born in Leningrad (Saint Petersburg). As of 2017, she is a figure skating coach based in Texas.
