= Hermann Schulz (figure skater) =

German figure skater

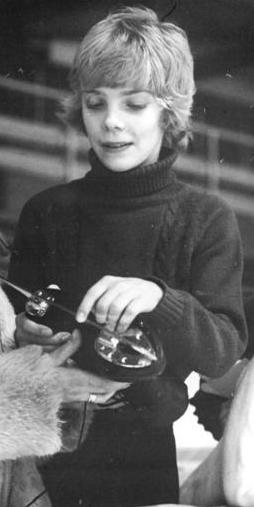
- Schulz in 1974

Personal information
- Born: 14 December 1961 (age 64) Dresden, Saxony, East Germany

Figure skating career
- Country: East Germany
- Coach: Ingrid Lehmann
- Skating club: Dresdner Eislauf-Club
- Retired: 1981

Hermann Schulz (born 14 December 1961) is a German former figure skater who represented East Germany. He is the 1981 national champion and competed at the 1980 Winter Olympics.

== Personal life ==
Schulz was born on 14 December 1961 in Dresden, Saxony, East Germany. He works as an internist at the center for dialysis in Döbeln.

== Skating career ==
Schulz learned his first triple jumps at Dresdner Eislauf-Club in Dresden. He was coached by Ingrid Lehmann. As a 13-year-old, he placed 8th at the 1975 European Championships in Copenhagen, Denmark. He won gold at the 1978 Blue Swords.

Schulz represented East Germany at the 1980 Winter Olympics in Lake Placid, New York. He became East Germany's national champion in 1981. At the 1981 European Championships, he was in the lead after the compulsory figures and finished fourth overall. He then retired from figure skating due to injuries.

Schulz has served as an international figure skating judge.

== Results ==
International
Event	72–73	73–74	74–75	75–76	76–77	77–78	78–79	79–80	80–81
Winter Olympics								11th	
World Champ.							12th	10th	
European Champ.			8th					5th	4th
Blue Swords			3rd				1st		
Moscow News			6th						
Grand Prize SNP	3rd J	1st J							
National
East Germany			2nd				3rd	3rd	1st
