= Carola Weißenberg =

German figure skater (born 1962)

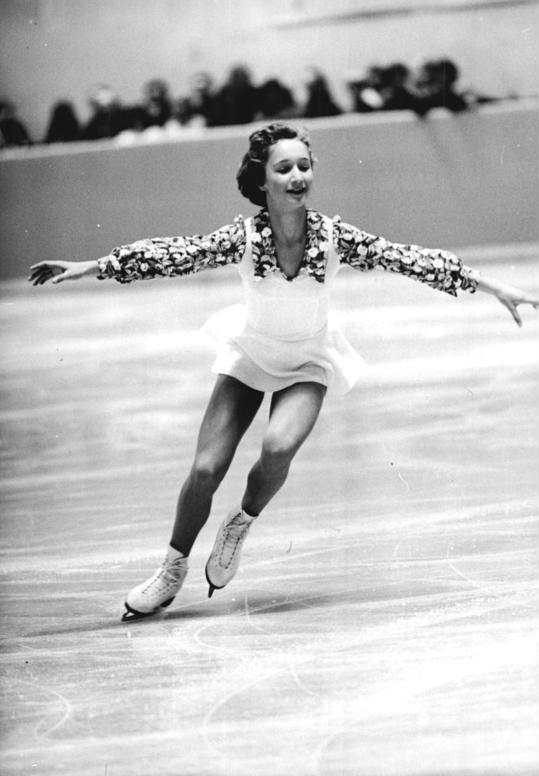
- Weißenberg in 1976

Personal information
- Other names: Fleischhauer
- Born: 24 December 1962 (age 63) Hohenschönhausen, East Germany

Figure skating career
- Country: East Germany
- Skating club: SC Dynamo Berlin
- Retired: c. 1980

Carola Weißenberg (born 24 December 1962 in Hohenschönhausen), married surname: Fleischhauer, is a German former figure skater who represented East Germany. She is the 1978 Prize of Moscow News champion, 1979 Richmond Trophy silver medalist, and a three-time national medalist. She finished in the top ten at the 1978 World Championships and three European Championships. Her skating club was SC Dynamo Berlin.

== Results ==
International
Event	74–75	75–76	76–77	77–78	78–79	79–80
World Champ.				10th	19th	13th
European Champ.				7th	5th	7th
Blue Swords		5th	3rd			3rd
Prize of Moscow News					1st	
Richmond Trophy						2nd
Grand Prize SNP	1st J					
National
East German Champ.				2nd	2nd	3rd
J = Junior level
