= Tanja Krienke =

East German figure skater

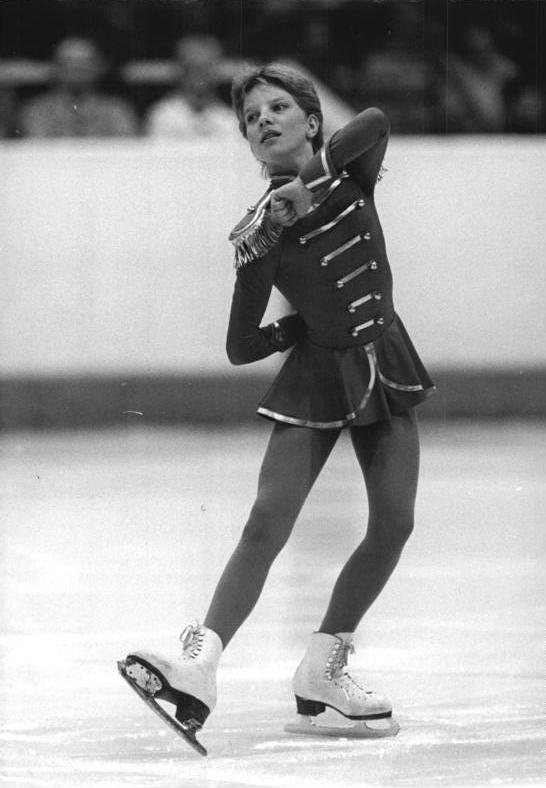
- Krienke in October 1987

Personal information
- Born: 13 December 1972 (age 53)

Figure skating career
- Country: East Germany
- Retired: 1991

Tanja Krienke (born 13 December 1972) is a former competitive figure skater for East Germany. She is the 1990 World Junior bronze medalist, 1989 Karl Schäfer Memorial silver medalist, and 1990 East German national champion. She was 6th at the 1990 European Championships.

== Competitive highlights ==
International
Event	1988–89	1989–90	1990–91
World Championships		15th	
European Championships		6th	
Skate Canada			6th
Karl Schäfer Memorial		2nd	
Novarat Trophy		2nd	
International: Junior
World Junior Championships	4th	3rd	
Blue Swords	1st	2nd	
National
East German Champ.		1st	
J = Junior level
