= Alexei Beletski =

Israeli former competitive ice dancer

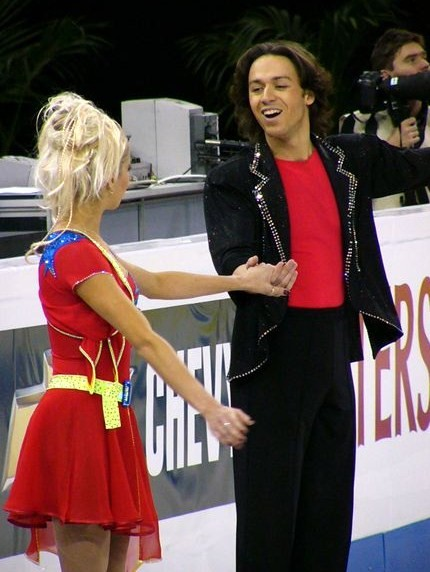
- Beletski with Gudina in 2004

Personal information
- Native name: אלכסיי בלצקי
- Born: 22 May 1979 (age 47) Odesa, Ukrainian SSR
- Height: 1.77 m (5 ft 9 1/2 in)

Figure skating career
- Country: Israel
- Partner: Natalia Gudina
- Coach: Gennadi Karponosov; Natalia Linichuk
- Skating club: Canada Centre Metulla
- Retired: 2005

Alexei Beletski (also Alexei Beletsky, Hebrew: אלכסיי בלצקי; born 22 May 1979) is an Israeli former competitive ice dancer. With his wife Natalia Gudina, he placed as high as 14th at the World Championships, as high as 9th at the European Championships, and competed at the Winter Olympics.

Gudina and Beletski married in 1999. They competed together for Ukraine until the end of 1998/1999 season, after which they switched to competing for Israel. Gudina and Beletski the 2000–05 Israeli national silver medalists. They placed 19th at the 2002 Winter Olympics.

== Programs ==
(with Gudina)

Season	Original dance	Free dance	Exhibition
2004–2005	Charleston; Slow Foxtrot; Quickstep	Cats by Andrew Lloyd Webber	
2003–2004	Boogie Woogie; Blues; Rock'n'Roll	Barber of Seville by Gioachino Rossini	
2002–2003	Waltz: The Drinking Song (from La traviata) by Giuseppe Verdi; Galop: Petersburger Galop by Strauss	Notre-Dame de Paris by Luc Plamondon, Riccardo Cocciante	While My Guitar Gently Weeps
2001–2002	Tango: El Choclo by Ángel Villoldo performed by Caterina Valente; Flamenco	Sirtaki performed by André Rieu; Agapi performed by Nana Mouskouri; Sirtaki	
2000–2001	Charleston from Cabaret; Foxtrot from Cabaret; Quickstep: Money Makes the World Go Round (from Cabaret) by John Kander	Blues from Blues Brothers 2000; Blues by Prince; Boogie from Blues Brothers 2000	

== Competitive highlights ==
(with Gudina)

Results
International
Event	1998–99	1999–00	2000–01	2001–02	2002–03	2003–04	2004–05
Olympics				19th			
Worlds			25th		14th	15th	18th
Europeans			17th	15th	11th	9th	13th
GP Bofrost Cup					5th		
GP Cup of China						6th	
GP Cup of Russia							6th
GP Lalique					5th		
GP NHK Trophy							6th
GP Skate America						7th	
Golden Spin		3rd	6th	7th			
Karl Schäfer					3rd		
Helena Pajovic				1st			
Skate Israel	6th	5th	5th			2nd	
National
Israeli Champ.		2nd	2nd	2nd	2nd	2nd	2nd
Ukrainian Champ.	4th						
GP = Grand Prix
