= Blue Swords Cup =

International figure skating competition

- Status: Defunct
- Genre: International competition
- Frequency: Annual
- Country: East Germany (1961–89); Germany (1990–96)
- Years active: 1961–96
- Organizer: Ice Skating Association of East Germany (1961–89); German Ice Skating Union (1990–96)

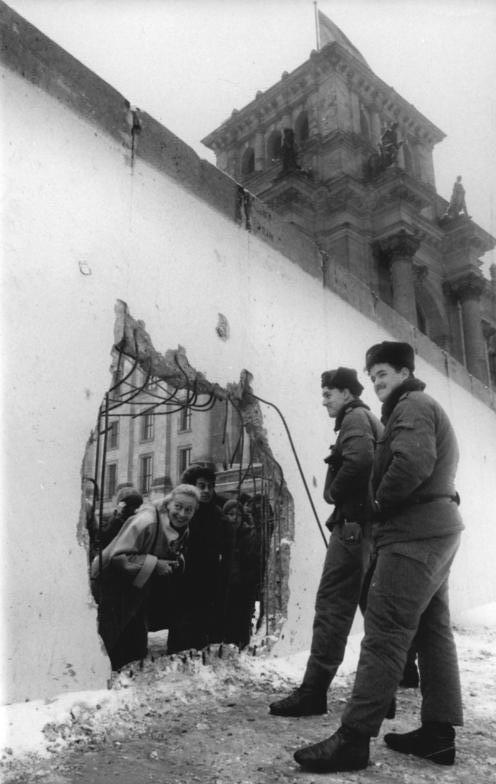
The fall of the Berlin Wall occurred during the same week as the 1989 Blue Swords Cup in East Berlin.

The Blue Swords Cup (German: Pokal der Blauen Schwerter) was an annual figure skating competition first organized by the Ice Skating Association of East Germany (German: Deutscher Eislauf Verband der DDR), and then by the German Ice Skating Union (German: Deutsche Eislauf-Union) after the reunification of Germany. Originally called the DELV-Pokal (Deutscher Eislauf-Verband-Pokal; Cup of the German Figure Skating Club), the first competition took place in 1961 in Dresden. The Blue Swords Cup was held every year from 1961 to 1996, after which point it was incorporated into the new ISU Junior Grand Prix of Figure Skating series.

The Blue Swords Cup was initially designed to allow young skaters the chance to compete internationally. Medals were awarded in men's singles, women's singles, pair skating, and ice dance, although each discipline was not necessarily held every year. Jan Hoffmann of East Germany holds the record for winning the most titles in men's singles, while Christine Errath and Gabriele Seyfert, both of East Germany, are tied for winning the most titles in women's singles. Manuela Groß and Uwe Kagelmann of East Germany hold the record in pair skating (with four), while Knut Schubert and Heinz-Ulrich Walther, also of East Germany, also won four titles each, but not with the same partners. Two teams are tied for winning the most titles in ice dance: Annerose Baier and Eberhard Rüger of East Germany, and Lyudmila Pakhomova and Aleksandr Gorshkov of the Soviet Union.

== History ==
The logo of Meissen Porcelain, which inspired the name of the Blue Swords Cup

The inaugural edition of the DELV-Pokal (Deutscher Eislauf-Verband-Pokal; Cup of the German Figure Skating Club) was held in 1961 in Dresden, in what was then East Germany. The competition was designed to provide young, up-and-coming skaters the chance the compete at an international event. Beginning in 1968, Meissen Porcelain became the competition's sponsor and the name was changed to reflect that sponsorship. The name Blue Swords refers to the company's logo, which depicts two blue crossed swords against a white background. Meissen Porcelain also sculpted the trophies that were awarded to the champions.

The Blue Swords Cup was held regularly between 1961 and 1996. It began as a senior-level event, but in 1984, the Ice Skating Association of East Germany reset the competition for junior-level skaters only. Banking on the fact that most junior-level skaters had few opportunities to compete internationally prior to the World Junior Figure Skating Championships, the East German federation hoped this change would drive participation in their event.

The fall of the Berlin Wall occurred while the 1989 Blue Swords Cup was in progress. Members of the U.S. figure skating team flocked to the Potsdamer Platz in East Berlin when crews began dismantling sections of the wall. Like many tourists, skaters were able to collect remnants of the wall as souvenirs. While the skating competition proceeded as normal, many of the East German volunteers at the arena did not return once East Germans were granted entry to West Berlin.

In 1997, the Junior Grand Prix of Figure Skating – then called the Junior Series – was established by the International Skating Union as a series of international skating competitions exclusively for junior-level skaters. The Blue Swords Cup was one of the inaugural events, and has been held numerous times since.

== Medalists ==
From 1953 to 1990, Chemnitz was known as Karl-Marx-Stadt.

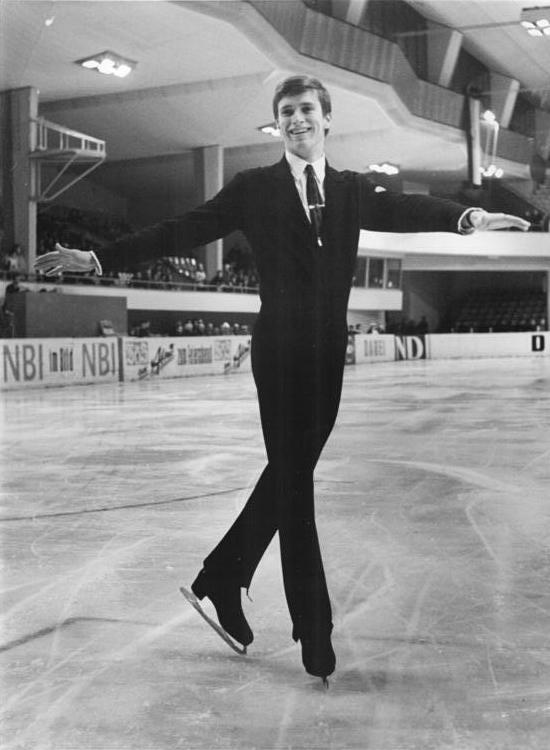
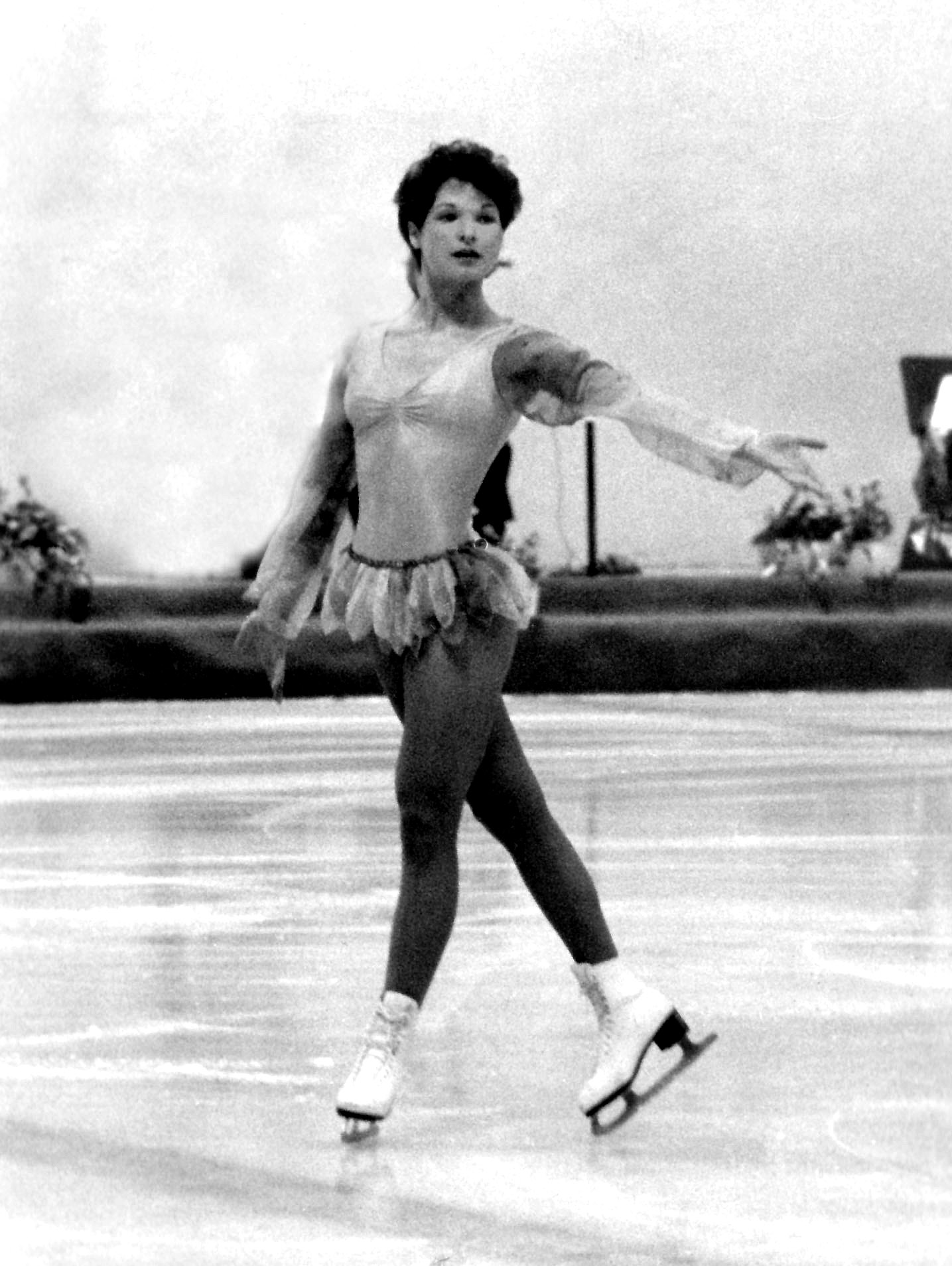
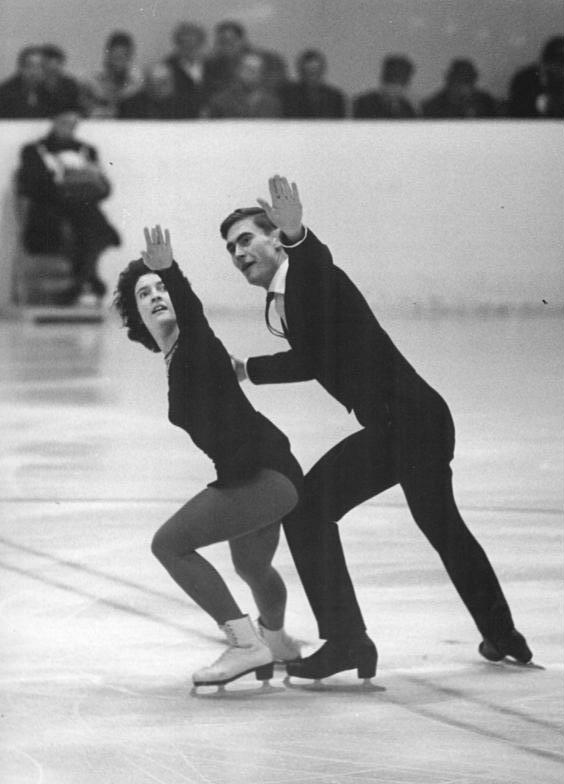
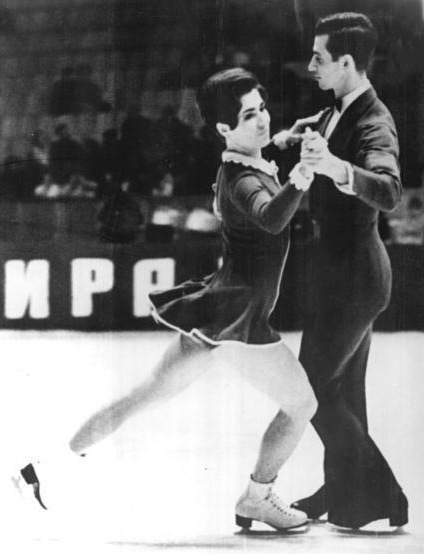
From left to right: Günter Zöller of East Germany, four-time Blue Swords champion in men's singles; Anett Pötzsch of East Germany, three-time Blue Swords champions in women's singles; Irene Müller and Hans-Georg Dallmer of East Germany, two-time Blue Swords champions in pair skating; and Lyudmila Pakhomova and Aleksandr Gorshkov of the Soviet Union, three-time Blue Swords champions in ice dance

=== Men's singles ===
Men's event medalists
Year	Location	Gold	Silver	Bronze	Ref.
1961	Dresden	(East Germany) Bodo Bockenauer	(Hungary) Károly Ujlaki	(Soviet Union) Mr. Kotek	
1962	East Berlin	(East Germany) Ralph Borghard	(Hungary) Károly Ujlaki	(Soviet Union) Valeri Meshkov	
1963	Dresden	(East Germany) Ralph Borghard	(East Germany) Bodo Bockenauer	(East Germany) Günter Zöller	
1964	East Berlin	(France) Robert Dureville	(Czechoslovakia) Ondrej Nepela	(East Germany) Günter Zöller	
1965	Karl-Marx-Stadt	(East Germany) Ralph Borghard	(France) Robert Dureville	(East Germany) Günter Zöller	
1966	Karl-Marx-Stadt	(East Germany) Günter Zöller	(Czechoslovakia) Marián Filc	(West Germany) Reinhard Ketterer	
1967	Karl-Marx-Stadt	(East Germany) Günter Zöller	(Soviet Union) Vladimir Kurenbin	(Austria) Günter Anderl	
1968	Karl-Marx-Stadt	(East Germany) Günter Zöller	(Soviet Union) Valeri Meshkov	(Soviet Union) Vladimir Kurenbin	
1969	Karl-Marx-Stadt	(East Germany) Günter Zöller	(Soviet Union) Vladimir Kovalev	(East Germany) Jan Hoffmann	
1970	Karl-Marx-Stadt	(East Germany) Jan Hoffmann	(Soviet Union) Igor Bobrin	(East Germany) Ralf Richter	
1971	Karl-Marx-Stadt	(East Germany) Jan Hoffmann	(East Germany) Bernd Wunderlich	(East Germany) Michael Glaubitz	
1972	Dresden	(East Germany) Jan Hoffmann	(East Germany) Bernd Wunderlich	(Soviet Union) Konstantin Kokora	
1973	Dresden	(East Germany) Jan Hoffmann	(Soviet Union) Igor Bobrin	(Austria) Ronald Koppelent	
1974	Karl-Marx-Stadt	(Soviet Union) Konstantin Kokora	(East Germany) Bernd Wunderlich	(East Germany) Hermann Schulz	
1975	Karl-Marx-Stadt	(East Germany) Jan Hoffmann	(Soviet Union) Andrei Yablokov	(East Germany) Mario Liebers	
1976	East Berlin	(Soviet Union) Konstantin Kokora	(East Germany) Mario Liebers	(France) Gilles Beyer	
1977	Karl-Marx-Stadt	(East Germany) Mario Liebers	(Germany) Joachim Ehmann	(Austria) Gerald Schranz	
1978	Karl-Marx-Stadt	(East Germany) Hermann Schulz	(Germany) Heiko Fischer	(East Germany) Torsten Ohlow	
1979	East Berlin	(East Germany) Jan Hoffmann	(East Germany) Mario Liebers	(Germany) Norbert Schramm	
1980	Karl-Marx-Stadt	(Poland) Grzegorz Głowania	(France) Didier Monge	(East Germany) Falko Kirsten	
1981	Karl-Marx-Stadt	(East Germany) Alexander König	(Germany) Joachim Ehmann	(Germany) Thomas Wieser	
1982	Karl-Marx-Stadt	(East Germany) Falko Kirsten	(France) Fernand Fédronic	(France) Didier Manaud	
1983	East Berlin	(Soviet Union) Boris Uspenski	(East Germany) Falko Kirsten	(France) Pierre Seveno	
1984	Karl-Marx-Stadt	(Soviet Union) Vladimir Petrenko	(France) Rudy Luccioni	(Germany) Daniel Weiss	
1985	East Berlin	(Soviet Union) Vladimir Petrenko	(United States) Rudy Galindo	(Soviet Union) Yuriy Tsymbalyuk	
1986	Karl-Marx-Stadt	(Soviet Union) Yuriy Tsymbalyuk	(East Germany) Rico Krahnert	(East Germany) Mirko Eichhorn	
1987	East Berlin	(East Germany) Ronny Winkler	(France) Philippe Candeloro	(Canada) Elvis Stojko	
1988	East Berlin	(Soviet Union) Vyacheslav Zahorodnyuk	(United States) Scott Davis	(East Germany) Mirko Eichhorn	
1989	East Berlin	(East Germany) Mirko Eichhorn	(Soviet Union) Sergei Minajev	(Romania) Zsolt Kerekes	
1990	Chemnitz	(Soviet Union) Dmitri Dmitrenko	(Germany) Jan Kannegiesßer	(France) Alexandre Orset	
1991	Chemnitz	(Soviet Union) Konstantin Kostin	(United States) John Bevan	(Germany) Patrick-René Reinhardt	
1992	Chemnitz	(Ukraine) Evgeni Pliuta	(France) Cyril Deplace	(Germany) Patrick-René Reinhardt	
1993	Chemnitz	(Japan) Naoki Shigematsu	(Canada) Yvan Desjardins	(Finland) Markus Leminen	
1994	Chemnitz	(France) Gabriel Monnier	(Germany) Jens ter Laak	(Germany) Michael Hopfes	
1995	Chemnitz	(Russia) Alexei Yagudin	(France) Gabriel Monnier	(Germany) David Jäschke	
1996	Chemnitz	(Russia) Evgeni Plushenko	(United States) Timothy Goebel	(France) Vincent Restencourt	
For results after 1996, see ISU Junior Grand Prix in Germany

=== Women's singles ===
Women's event medalists
Year	Location	Gold	Silver	Bronze	Ref.
1961	Dresden	(East Germany) Gabriele Seyfert	(Hungary) Helga Zöllner	(Czechoslovakia) Alena Pokorná	
1962	East Berlin	(Czechoslovakia) Eva Grožajová	(East Germany) Gabriele Seyfert	(East Germany) Heidemarie Steiner	
1963	Dresden	(East Germany) Gabriele Seyfert	(United Kingdom) Diana Clifton-Peach	(East Germany) Heidemarie Steiner	
1964	East Berlin	(East Germany) Gabriele Seyfert	(Czechoslovakia) Jana Mrázková	(East Germany) Beate Richter	
1965	Karl-Marx-Stadt	(East Germany) Gabriele Seyfert	(East Germany) Beate Richter	(Austria) Hilde Überlacher	
1966	Karl-Marx-Stadt	(East Germany) Gabriele Seyfert	(East Germany) Martina Clausner	(East Germany) Beate Richter	
1967	Karl-Marx-Stadt	(East Germany) Beate Richter	(East Germany) Martina Clausner	(East Germany) Sybille Stolfig	
1968	Karl-Marx-Stadt	(East Germany) Sonja Morgenstern	(Austria) Eva Kriegelstein	(East Germany) Christine Errath	
1969	Karl-Marx-Stadt	(East Germany) Sonja Morgenstern	(East Germany) Simone Gräfe	(East Germany) Christine Errath	
1970	Karl-Marx-Stadt	(East Germany) Sonja Morgenstern	(East Germany) Christine Errath	(East Germany) Simone Gräfe	
1971	Karl-Marx-Stadt	(East Germany) Christine Errath	(Sweden) Anita Johansson	(Soviet Union) Marina Titova	
1972	Dresden	(East Germany) Christine Errath	(East Germany) Steffi Knoll	(East Germany) Marion Weber	
1973	Dresden	(East Germany) Christine Errath	(East Germany) Anett Pötzsch	(East Germany) Marion Weber	
1974	Karl-Marx-Stadt	(East Germany) Christine Errath	(East Germany) Anett Pötzsch	(East Germany) Marion Weber	
1975	Karl-Marx-Stadt	(East Germany) Christine Errath	(East Germany) Anett Pötzsch	(Germany) Petra Wagner	
1976	East Berlin	(East Germany) Anett Pötzsch	(East Germany) Marion Weber	(East Germany) Carola Weissenberg	
1977	Karl-Marx-Stadt	(Soviet Union) Natalia Strelkova	(East Germany) Marion Weber	(Romania) Gabriela Voica	
1978	Karl-Marx-Stadt	(East Germany) Katarina Witt	(Austria) Sonja Stanek	(East Germany) Kerstin Wolf	
1979	East Berlin	(East Germany) Anett Pötzsch	(East Germany) Katarina Witt	(East Germany) Carola Weissenberg	
1980	Karl-Marx-Stadt	(East Germany) Anett Pötzsch	(Soviet Union) Svetlana Frantsuzova	(East Germany) Janina Wirth	
1981	Karl-Marx-Stadt	(East Germany) Katarina Witt	(Soviet Union) Anna Kondrashova	(Germany) Carmen Hartfiel	
1982	Karl-Marx-Stadt	(East Germany) Janina Wirth	(Austria) Petra Schruf	(East Germany) Kerstin Wolf	
1983	East Berlin	(East Germany) Janina Wirth	(Italy) Beatrice Gelmini	(East Germany) Marion Krause	
1984	Karl-Marx-Stadt	(East Germany) Inga Gauter	(Soviet Union) Natalia Skrabnevskaya	(East Germany) Evelyn Großmann	
1985	East Berlin	(Soviet Union) Natalia Gorbenko	(East Germany) Inga Gauter	(West Germany) Cornelia Renner	
1986	Karl-Marx-Stadt	(East Germany) Inga Gauter	(East Germany) Tanja Krienke	(Soviet Union) Alina Pisarenko	
1987	East Berlin	(Canada) Karen Preston	(Japan) Atsuko Suda	(East Germany) Kathleen Fenske	
1988	East Berlin	(East Germany) Tanja Krienke	(United States) Tisha Walker	(France) Stephanie Ferrer	
1989	East Berlin	(United States) Robyn Petroskey	(East Germany) Tanja Krienke	(Finland) Kaisa Kella	
1990	Chemnitz	(Soviet Union) Maria Jerdzizkaja	(France) Marie-Pierre Leray	(Japan) Kumiko Koiwai	
1991	Chemnitz	(Poland) Anna Rechnio	(Canada) Stephanie Fiorito	(Germany) Susanne Mildenberger	
1992	Chemnitz	(Germany) Tanja Szewczenko	(Germany) Astrid Hochstetter	(Japan) Yuko Fukuya	
1993	Chemnitz	(Ukraine) Irina Zayats	(Czech Republic) Kateřina Beránková	(Germany) Astrid Hochstetter	
1994	Chemnitz	(United States) Tara Lipinski	(Ukraine) Yulia Lavrenchuk	(Japan) Masayo Oishi	
1995	Chemnitz	(United States) Sydne Vogel	(Russia) Elena Pingacheva	(Japan) Fumie Suguri	
1996	Chemnitz	(Russia) Elena Pingacheva	(United States) Angela Nikodinov	(Germany) Veronika Dytrt	
For results after 1996, see ISU Junior Grand Prix in Germany

=== Pairs ===
Pairs' event medalists
Year	Location	Gold	Silver	Bronze	Ref.
1961	Dresden	(East Germany); Renate Rössler; Klaus Wasserfuhr	(Czechoslovakia); Milada Kubíková; Jaroslav Votruba	(East Germany); Margit Senf; Peter Göbel	
1962	East Berlin	(East Germany); Irene Müller; Hans-Georg Dallmer	(East Germany); Brigitte Wokoeck; Heinz-Ulrich Walther	(Soviet Union); Tatiana Sharanova; Alexander Gorelik	
1963	Dresden	(East Germany); Brigitte Wokoeck; Heinz-Ulrich Walther	(East Germany); Margit Senf; Peter Göbel	(Czechoslovakia); Olga Reinišová; Pavel Komárek	
1964	East Berlin	(East Germany); Irene Müller; Hans-Georg Dallmer	(East Germany); Renate Rössler; Klaus Wasserfuhr	(East Germany); Brigitte Weise; Michael Brychczy	
1965	Karl-Marx-Stadt	(East Germany); Heidemarie Steiner; Heinz-Ulrich Walther	(East Germany); Irene Müller; Hans-Georg Dallmer	(Soviet Union); Tatiana Tarasova; Georgi Proskurin	
1966	Karl-Marx-Stadt	(East Germany); Heidemarie Steiner; Heinz-Ulrich Walther	(East Germany); Renate Rössler; Klaus Wasserfuhr	(East Germany); Marianne Mirmsecker; Peter Göbel	
1967	Karl-Marx-Stadt	(East Germany); Heidemarie Steiner; Heinz-Ulrich Walther	(Soviet Union); Lyudmila Suslina; Alexander Tikhomirov	(East Germany); Brigitte Weise; Michael Brychczy	
1968	Karl-Marx-Stadt	(Soviet Union); Lyudmila Suslina; Alexander Tikhomirov	(East Germany); Monika Heibig; Axel Salzmann	(Soviet Union); Galina Karelina; Georgi Proskurin	
1969	Karl-Marx-Stadt	(Soviet Union); Lyudmila Smirnova; Andrei Suraikin	(East Germany); Manuela Groß; Uwe Kagelmann	(East Germany); Beatrix von Brück; Reinhard Mirmsecker	
1970	Karl-Marx-Stadt	(East Germany); Manuela Groß; Uwe Kagelmann	(Soviet Union); Tatiana Sharanova; Anatoli Evdokimov	(East Germany); Marlis Radunsky; Rolf Österreich	
1971	Karl-Marx-Stadt	(East Germany); Marlis Radunsky; Rolf Österreich	(East Germany); Romy Kermer; Andreas Forner	(Soviet Union); Irina Vorobjeva; Alexander Vlasov	
1972	Dresden	(East Germany); Manuela Groß; Uwe Kagelmann	(East Germany); Romy Kermer; Rolf Österreich	(Soviet Union); Marina Leonidova; Vladimir Bogolyubov	
1973	Dresden	(East Germany); Manuela Groß; Uwe Kagelmann	(East Germany); Romy Kermer; Rolf Österreich	(Soviet Union); Marina Leonidova; Vladimir Bogolyubov	
1974	Karl-Marx-Stadt	(East Germany); Romy Kermer; Rolf Österreich	(East Germany); Manuela Groß; Uwe Kagelmann	(East Germany); Katja Schubert; Knut Schubert	
1975	Karl-Marx-Stadt	(East Germany); Manuela Groß; Uwe Kagelmann	(East Germany); Kerstin Stolfig; Veit Kempe	(East Germany); Sabine Baeß; Tassilo Thierbach	
1976	East Berlin	(East Germany); Katja Schubert; Knut Schubert	(East Germany); Manuela Mager; Uwe Bewersdorff	(East Germany); Cornelia Haufe; Kersten Bellmann	
1977	Karl-Marx-Stadt	(East Germany); Manuela Mager; Uwe Bewersdorff	(East Germany); Sabine Baeß; Tassilo Thierbach	(Soviet Union); Galina Tairova; Alexei Golovkin	
1978	Karl-Marx-Stadt	(East Germany); Sabine Baeß; Tassilo Thierbach	(East Germany); Cornelia Haufe; Kersten Bellmann	(Soviet Union); Elena Vasyukova; Alexei Pogodin	
1979	East Berlin	(East Germany); Sabine Baeß; Tassilo Thierbach	(East Germany); Kerstin Stolfig; Veit Kempe	(East Germany); Cornelia Haufe; Kersten Bellmann	
1980	Karl-Marx-Stadt	(Soviet Union); Inna Volyanskaya; Valery Spiridonov	(East Germany); Birgit Lorenz; Knut Schubert	(East Germany); Cornelia Haufe; Kersten Bellmann	
1981	Karl-Marx-Stadt	(East Germany); Birgit Lorenz; Knut Schubert	(Soviet Union); Elena Kashinzeva; Alexei Pogodin	(Soviet Union); Elena Bechke; Valeri Kornienko	
1982	Karl-Marx-Stadt	(East Germany); Birgit Lorenz; Knut Schubert	(Soviet Union); Inna Volyanskaya; Valery Spiridonov	(Soviet Union); Lyudmila Koblova; Andrei Kalitin	
1983	East Berlin	(East Germany); Birgit Lorenz; Knut Schubert	(East Germany); Babette Preußler; Tobias Schröter	(Soviet Union); Tatiana Chozko; Oleg Efimov	
1984	Karl-Marx-Stadt	(Soviet Union); Irina Mironenko; Dmitri Shkidchenko	(East Germany); Antje Schramm; Jens Müller	(East Germany); Katrin Kanitz; Alexander König	
1985	East Berlin	(East Germany); Antje Schramm; Jens Müller	(East Germany); Mandy Hannebauer; Marno Kreft	(Soviet Union); Ekaterina Murugova; Artem Torgashev	
1986	Karl-Marx-Stadt	(East Germany); Mandy Hannebauer; Marno Kreft	(East Germany); Antje Schramm; Jens Müller	(Soviet Union); Irina Saifutdinova; Andrei Bardykin	
1987	East Berlin	(Soviet Union); Inna Svetacheva; Vladimr Shapov	(East Germany); Mandy Hannebauer; Marno Kreft	(Canada); Jodi Barnes; Rob Williams	
1988	East Berlin	(Soviet Union); Elena Nikonova; Nikolai Apter	(Canada); Sherry Ball; Christopher Bourne	(East Germany); Angela Caspari; Marno Kreft	
1989	East Berlin	(Soviet Union); Elena Vlasenko; Sergei Ostriy	(United States); Aimee Offner; Brian Helgenberg	(Canada); Shae-Lynn Bourne; Andrew Bertleff	
1990	Chemnitz	No pairs competitors			
1991	Chemnitz	(Soviet Union); Natalia Krestianinova; Alexei Torchinski	(Canada); Isabelle Coulombe; Bruno Marcotte	(United States); Nicole Sciarrotta; Gregory Sciarrotta	
1992	Chemnitz	(Russia); Inga Korshunova; Dmitri Saveliev	(Canada); Julie Laporte; David Pelletier	(Germany); Nadine Pflaum; Kristian Simeunovic	
1993	Chemnitz	(Germany); Silvia Dimitrov; Rico Rex	(Ukraine); Tatiana Lazarenko; Denis Garbusov	(France); Sophie Guestault; François Guestault	
1994	Chemnitz	(United States); Danielle Hartsell; Steve Hartsell	(Ukraine); Evgenia Filonenko; Igor Marchenko	(Russia); Olga Semkina; Andrei Chuvilaev	
1995	Chemnitz	(Russia); Irina Maslennikova; Konstantin Krasnenkov	(Ukraine); Evgenia Filonenko; Igor Marchenko	(Russia); Victoria Maksyuta; Vladislav Zhovnirski	
1996	Chemnitz	(Russia); Maria Petrova; Teimuraz Pouline	(Russia); Victoria Maksyuta; Vladislav Zhovnirski	(France); Sabrina Lefrançois; Nicolas Osseland	
For results after 1996, see ISU Junior Grand Prix in Germany

=== Ice dance ===
Ice dance event medalists
Year	Location	Gold	Silver	Bronze	Ref.
1962	East Berlin	(East Germany); Eva-Maria Reuter; Bernd Egert	(East Germany); Annerose Baier; Eberhard Rüger	(Hungary); Edit Mató; Elek Riedl	
1963	Dresden	(East Germany); Annerose Baier; Eberhard Rüger	(East Germany); Monika Ziemke; Jochen Bode	(East Germany); Eva-Maria Reuter; Bernd Egert	
1964	East Berlin	(Hungary); Györgyi Korda; Pál Vásárhelyi	(East Germany); Annerose Baier; Eberhard Rüger	(East Germany); Eva-Maria Reuter; Bernd Egert	
1965	Karl-Marx-Stadt	(East Germany); Annerose Baier; Eberhard Rüger	(East Germany); Norma Allwelt; Michael Schmidt	(Czechoslovakia); Dana Novotná; Jaroslav Hainz	
1966	Karl-Marx-Stadt	(East Germany); Annerose Baier; Eberhard Rüger	(Soviet Union); Lyudmila Pakhomova; Aleksandr Gorshkov	(United Kingdom); Susan Getty; Roy Bradshaw	
1967	Karl-Marx-Stadt	(Soviet Union); Lyudmila Pakhomova; Aleksandr Gorshkov	(East Germany); Annerose Baier; Eberhard Rüger	(United Kingdom); Fiona Hunt; Lynd Taylor	
1968	Karl-Marx-Stadt	(Soviet Union); Lyudmila Pakhomova; Aleksandr Gorshkov	(East Germany); Annerose Baier; Eberhard Rüger	(Hungary); Ilona Berecz; Istvan Sugar	
1969	Karl-Marx-Stadt	(Soviet Union); Lyudmila Pakhomova; Aleksandr Gorshkov	(East Germany); Annerose Baier; Eberhard Rüger	(Soviet Union); Tatiana Voitiuk; Viacheslav Zhigalin	
1970–90	No ice dance competitions				
1991	Chemnitz	(Soviet Union); Elena Grushina; Ruslan Honcharov	(Poland); Sylwia Nowak; Sebastian Kolasiński	(Canada); Elizabeth Hollett; Pierre-Hugues Chouinard	
1992	Chemnitz	(Russia); Olga Sharutenko; Dmitri Naumkin	(Poland); Iwona Filipowicz; Michał Szumski	(Ukraine); Olga Mudrak; Vitaliy Baranov	
1993	Chemnitz	(Ukraine); Karina Martirossian; Alexandr Poddubskiy	(France); Dominique Deniaud; Martial Jaffredo	(France); Magali Sauri; Nicolas Salicis	
1994	Chemnitz	(Russia); Olga Sharutenko; Dmitri Naumkin	(Ukraine); Elena Piatash; Andrei Baka	(France); Marianne Haguenauer; Romain Haguenauer	
1995	Chemnitz	(Russia); Ekaterina Davydova; Roman Kostomarov	(Poland); Jolanta Bury; Łukasz Zalewski	(Ukraine); Natalia Gudina; Vitali Kurkudym	
1996	Chemnitz	(Russia); Nina Ulanova; Michail Stifunin	(Poland); Agata Błażowska; Marcin Kozubek	(United States); Jessica Joseph; Charles Butler	
For results after 1996, see ISU Junior Grand Prix in Germany

== Records ==
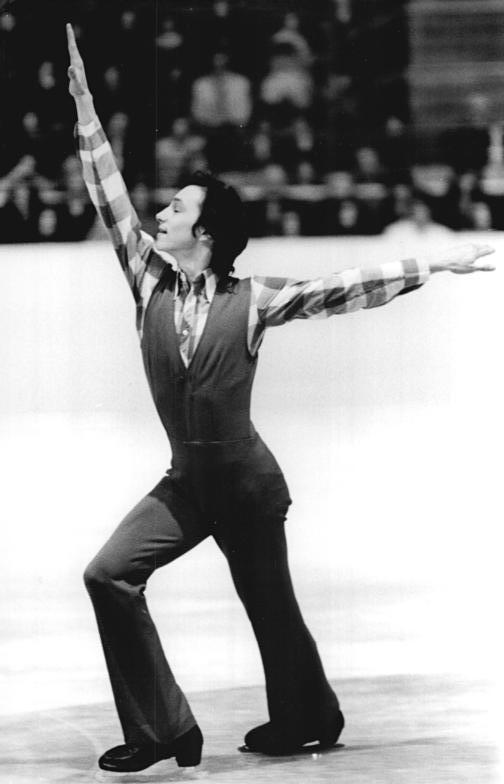
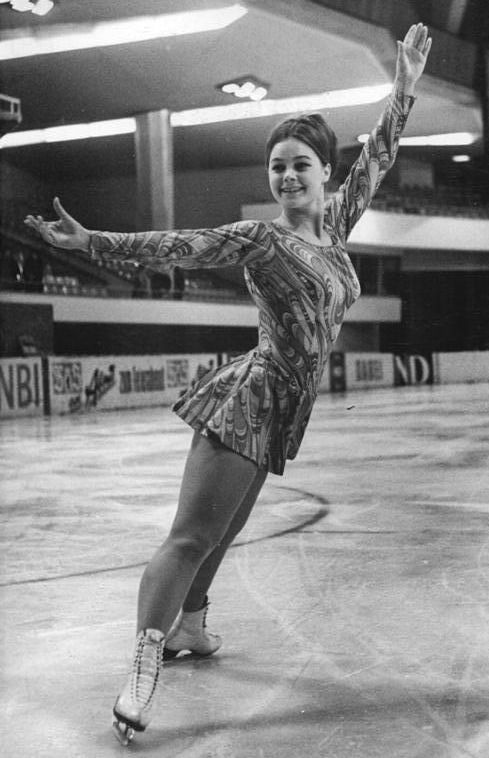
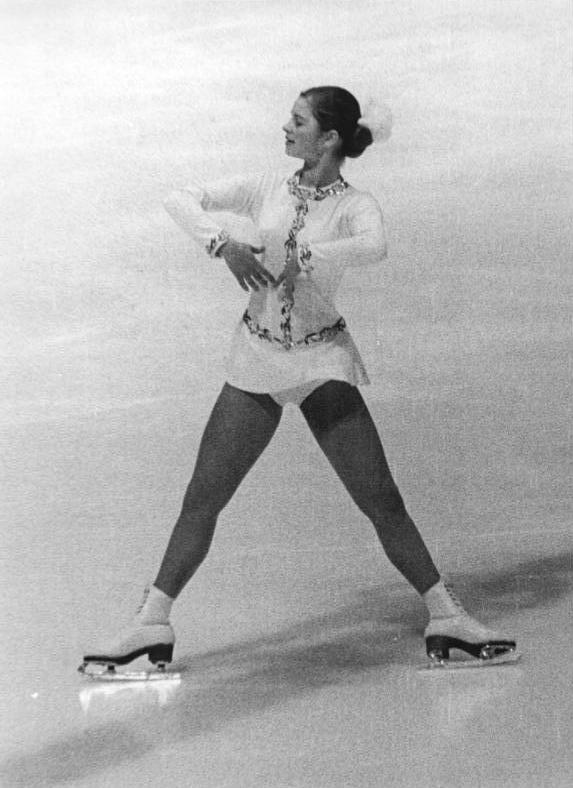
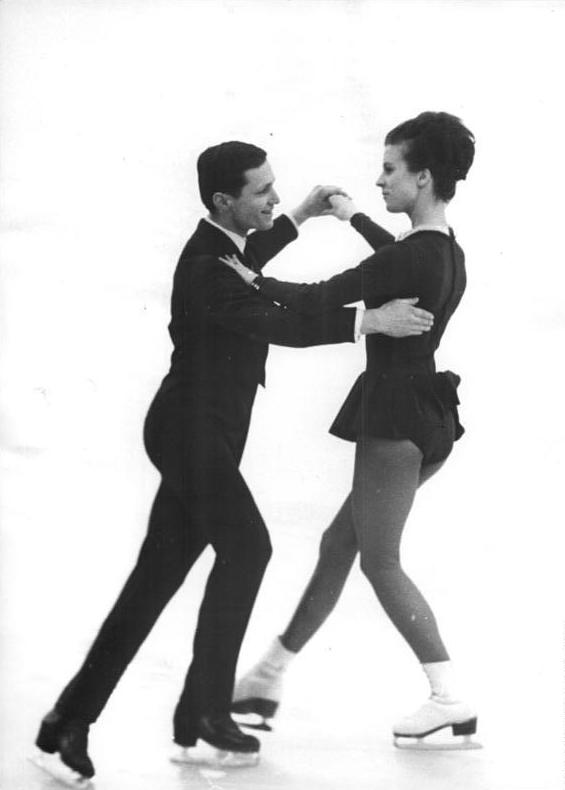
From left to right (all from East Germany): Jan Hoffmann, six-time Blue Swords champion in men's singles; Gabriele Seyfert and Christine Errath, five-time Blue Swords champions in women's singles; Annerose Baier and Eberhard Rüger, three-time Blue Swords champions in ice dance
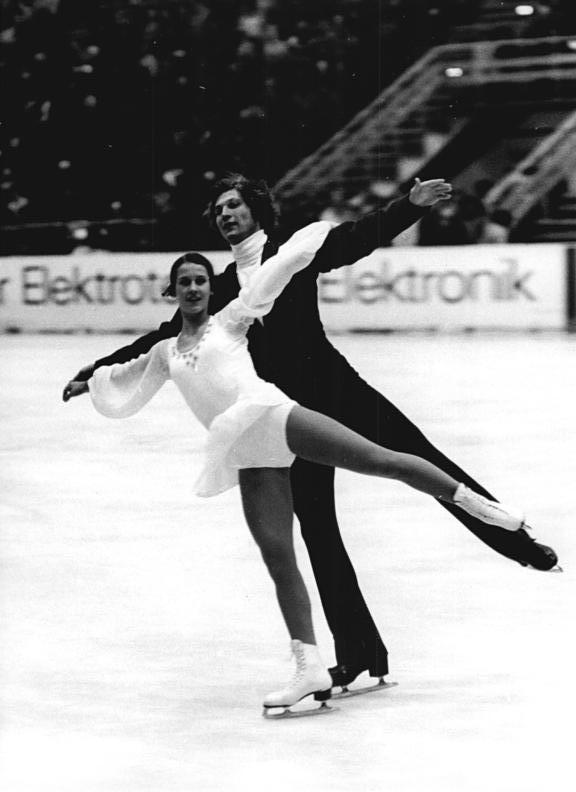
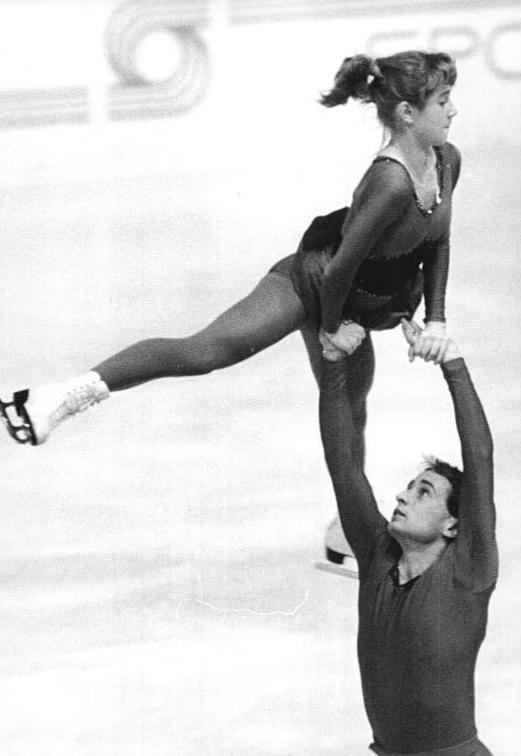
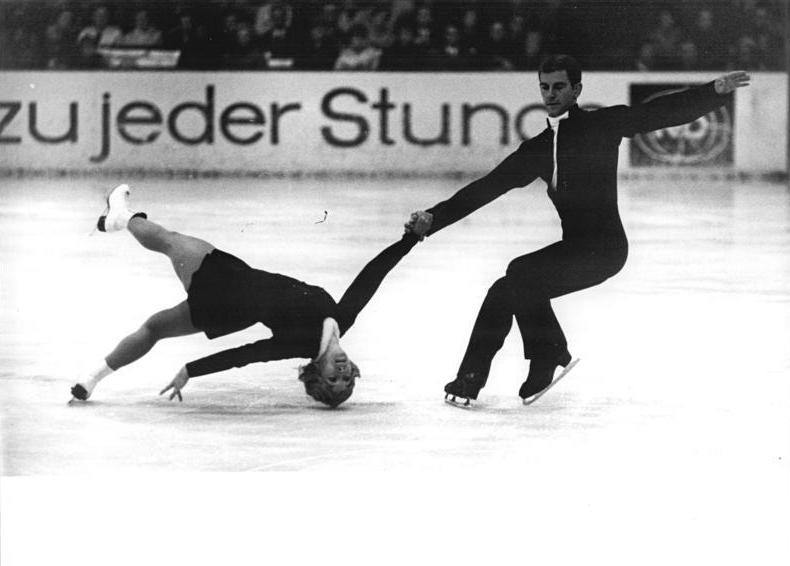
From left to right (all from East Germany): Manuela Groß and Uwe Kagelmann, four-time Blue Swords champions in pair skating; Knut Schubert, four time Blue Swords champion in pair skating (three times with Birgit Lorenz); and Heinz-Ulrich Walther, four-time Blue Swords champion in pair skating (three times with Heidemarie Steiner)

Records
Discipline	Most titles			
Discipline	Skater(s)	No.	Years	Ref.
Men's singles	(East Germany); Jan Hoffmann	6	1970–73; 1975; 1979	
Women's singles	(East Germany); Christine Errath	5	1971–75	
Women's singles	(East Germany); Gabriele Seyfert	5	1961; 1963–66	
Pairs	(East Germany); Manuela Groß; Uwe Kagelmann	4	1970; 1972–73; 1975	
Pairs	(East Germany); Knut Schubert; (Note: Knut Schubert won one Blue Swords title with Katja Schubert (1976), and three with Birgit Lorenz (1981–83).)	4	1976; 1981–83	
Pairs	(East Germany); Heinz-Ulrich Walther; (Note: Heinz-Ulrich Walther won one Blue Swords title with Brigitte Wokoeck (1963), and three with Heidemarie Steiner (1965–67).)	4	1963; 1965–67	
Ice dance	(East Germany); Annerose Baier; Eberhard Rüger	3	1963; 1965–66	
Ice dance	(Soviet Union); Lyudmila Pakhomova; Aleksandr Gorshkov	3	1967–69	

== Cumulative medal count ==
=== Men's singles ===
Total number of Blue Swords medals in men's singles by nation
Rank	Nation	Gold	Silver	Bronze	Total
1	East Germany	20	8	12	40
2	Soviet Union	9	7	5	21
3	France	2	7	5	14
4	Russia	2	0	0	2
5	Japan	1	0	0	1
5	Poland	1	0	0	1
5	Ukraine	1	0	0	1
8	United States	0	4	0	4
9	West Germany	0	3	4	7
10	Germany	0	2	4	6
11	Czechoslovakia	0	2	0	2
11	Hungary	0	2	0	2
13	Canada	0	1	1	2
14	Austria	0	0	3	3
15	Finland	0	0	1	1
15	Romania	0	0	1	1
Totals (16 entries)		36	36	36	108

=== Women's singles ===
Total number of Blue Swords medals in women's singles by nation
Rank	Nation	Gold	Silver	Bronze	Total
1	East Germany	24	16	19	59
2	Soviet Union	3	3	2	8
3	United States	3	2	0	5
4	Germany	1	1	3	5
5	Czechoslovakia	1	1	1	3
6	Canada	1	1	0	2
6	Russia	1	1	0	2
6	Ukraine	1	1	0	2
9	Poland	1	0	0	1
10	Austria	0	3	1	4
11	France	0	2	1	3
12	Japan	0	1	4	5
13	Czech Republic	0	1	0	1
13	Great Britain	0	1	0	1
13	Hungary	0	1	0	1
13	Sweden	0	1	0	1
17	West Germany	0	0	3	3
18	Finland	0	0	1	1
18	Romania	0	0	1	1
Totals (19 entries)		36	36	36	108

=== Pairs ===
Total number of Blue Swords medals in pairs by nation
Rank	Nation	Gold	Silver	Bronze	Total
1	East Germany	22	22	13	57
2	Soviet Union	8	4	13	25
3	Russia	3	1	2	6
4	United States	1	1	1	3
5	Germany	1	0	1	2
6	Canada	0	3	2	5
7	Ukraine	0	3	0	3
8	Czechoslovakia	0	1	1	2
9	France	0	0	2	2
Totals (9 entries)		35	35	35	105

=== Ice dance ===
Total number of Blue Swords medals in ice dance by nation
Rank	Nation	Gold	Silver	Bronze	Total
1	East Germany	4	7	2	13
2	Soviet Union	4	1	1	6
3	Russia	4	0	0	4
4	Ukraine	1	1	2	4
5	Hungary	1	0	2	3
6	Poland	0	4	0	4
7	France	0	1	2	3
8	Great Britain	0	0	2	2
9	Canada	0	0	1	1
9	Czechoslovakia	0	0	1	1
9	United States	0	0	1	1
Totals (11 entries)		14	14	14	42

=== Total medals ===
Total number of Blue Swords medals by nation
Rank	Nation	Gold	Silver	Bronze	Total
1	East Germany	70	53	46	169
2	Soviet Union	24	15	21	60
3	Russia	10	2	2	14
4	United States	4	7	2	13
5	Ukraine	3	5	2	10
6	France	2	10	10	22
7	Poland	2	4	0	6
8	Germany	2	3	8	13
9	Canada	1	5	4	10
10	Czechoslovakia	1	4	3	8
11	Hungary	1	3	2	6
12	Japan	1	1	4	6
13	West Germany	0	3	7	10
14	Austria	0	3	4	7
15	Great Britain	0	1	2	3
16	Czech Republic	0	1	0	1
16	Sweden	0	1	0	1
18	Finland	0	0	2	2
18	Romania	0	0	2	2
Totals (19 entries)		121	121	121	363
