= Valery Spiridonov =

Soviet pair skater

- Spiridonov at the 1980 Blue Swords

Personal information
- Native name: Валерий Фёдорович Спиридонов
- Full name: Valery Fydorovich Spiridonov
- Other names: Valeri/Valeriy Fedorovich Spiridonov
- Born: 1957 (age 68–69)

Figure skating career
- Country: Soviet Union
- Partner: Inna Volyanskaya; Zoya Akinfieva
- Skating club: DSO Trud Moscow

Valery Fydorovich Spiridonov (Russian: Валерий Фёдорович Спиридонов, born in 1957) is a former pair skater who competed for the Soviet Union. With Inna Volyanskaya, he won six international medals, including gold at the 1982 Nebelhorn Trophy.

== Career ==
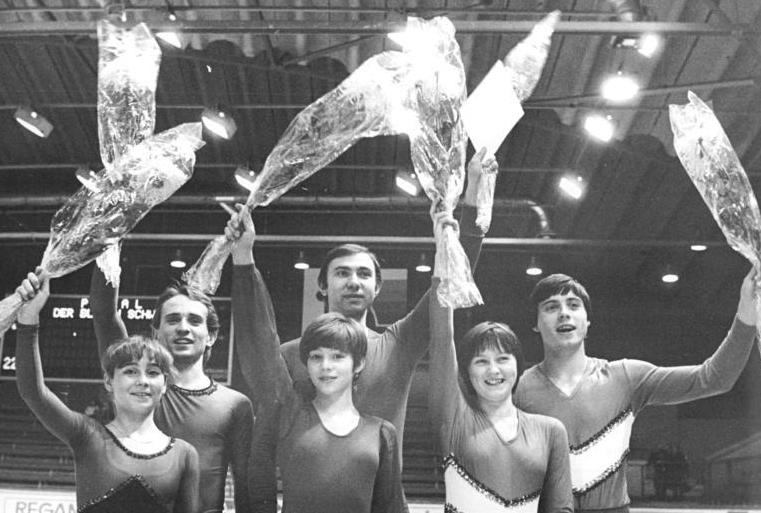
Volyanskaya/Spiridonov (centre) at the 1980 Blue Swords

Early in his career, Spiridonov skated with Zoya Akinfieva. By 1979, he was competing with Inna Volyanskaya.

Volyanskaya/Spiridonov won silver at the 1980 St. Ivel International, gold at the 1980 Blue Swords, silver at the 1981 Prague Skate, gold at the 1982 Grand Prix International St. Gervais, and gold at the 1982 Nebelhorn Trophy. After retiring from competition, they skated together in ice shows, including Torvill & Dean, and the Russian Allstars.

Spiridonov coaches in Moscow.

== Personal life ==
Spiridonov was born in 1957. He was formerly married to Volyanskaya. He later married Soviet ice dancer Elena Garanina. Their son, Anton Spiridonov (born 5 August 1998, United States), has competed in ice dancing for Russia, the United Kingdom, and the United States.

Following the 2025 Potomac River mid-air collision, Spiridonov was initially suspected of having been on board the PSA Airlines aircraft involved in the collision but confirmed on 30 January 2025 that he had not been on the flight.

== Competitive highlights ==
with Volyanskaya

International
Event	1979–80	1980–81	1981–82	1982–83
Blue Swords		1st		2nd
Nebelhorn Trophy				1st
NHK Trophy			4th	
Prague Skate			2nd	
St. Gervais International				1st
St. Ivel International		2nd		
National
Soviet Championships	3rd	6th	4th	
