= Anatoli Evdokimov =

Russian pair skater

Personal information
- Native name: Анатолий Григорьевич Евдокимов
- Full name: Anatoli Grigoryevich Evdokimov
- Born: 17 June 1945 Moscow, Russian SFSR, Soviet Union
- Died: 15 April 2016 (aged 70) Kyiv, Ukraine

Figure skating career
- Country: Soviet Union
- Partner: Tatiana Sharanova
- Coach: Elena Vasilieva, Anatoli Eremin
- Retired: 1970s

Anatoli Grigoryevich Evdokimov (Russian: Анатолий Григорьевич Евдокимов; 17 June 1945 – 15 April 2016) was a Russian former pair skater who represented the Soviet Union in the 1960s and early 1970s. He began skating at the Luzhniki ice rink in Moscow. His partnership with his wife, Tatiana Sharanova, began by 1966. The two finished 5th at the 1967 European Championships in Ljubljana, Yugoslavia, and 8th at the 1967 World Championships in Vienna, Austria. They won silver at the 1966 Prize of Moscow News, gold at the 1967 Prague Skate, and silver at the 1970 Blue Swords.

After retiring from competition, Evdokimov worked for an ice ballet based in Kiev and taught skating at Syuita Kiev. On 15 April 2016, the Ukrainian Figure Skating Federation reported that he had died.

== Competitive highlights ==
with Sharanova

International
Event	66–67	67–68	68–69	69–70	70–71
World Championships	8th				
European Championships	5th				
Blue Swords					2nd
Prague Skate		1st			
Prize of Moscow News	2nd			3rd	4th
Winter Universiade		2nd			
National
Soviet Championships	3rd		5th		5th
