= Lyudmila Suslina =

Russian former pair skater (born 1946)

Personal information
- Native name: Людмила Павловна Суслина
- Full name: Lyudmila Pavlovna Suslina
- Born: 5 October 1946 (age 80) Moscow, Soviet Union

Figure skating career
- Country: Soviet Union
- Partner: Alexander Tikhomirov
- Coach: Mikhail Drei

Lyudmila Pavlovna Suslina (Russian: Людмила Павловна Суслина; born 5 October 1946) is a Russian former pair skater who represented the Soviet Union. With Alexander Tikhomirov, she is the 1968 Winter Universiade bronze medalist. The pair also won silver at the 1967 Blue Swords, silver at the 1967 Prize of Moscow News, and gold at the 1968 Blue Swords.
