= Astrid Hochstetter =

German figure skater

Personal information
- Born: 4 August 1979 (age 46) Kirchheim unter Teck, West Germany
- Height: 1.68 m (5 ft 6 in)

Figure skating career
- Country: Germany
- Coach: Peter Meyer
- Skating club: ERC Westfalen Dortmund
- Began skating: 1984
- Retired: January 1999

Astrid Hochstetter (born 4 August 1979) is a German former figure skater who competed in ladies' singles. She placed 14th at the 1994 World Junior Championships. In 1996, she became the German national senior champion and was sent to the European Championships, where she placed 16th.

Hochstetter was coached by Peter Meyer and belonged to ERC Westfalen in Dortmund. She retired from competition in January 1999.

== Competitive highlights ==
GP: Champions Series (Grand Prix)

International
Event	91–92	92–93	93–94	94–95	95–96	96–97	97–98
European Champ.					16th		
GP Skate Canada						8th	
GP Trophée de France					8th		
Finlandia Trophy							15th
Nebelhorn Trophy		7th	5th				
Penta Cup			2nd				
Prague Skate		6th					
Schäfer Memorial				10th		9th	
Skate Canada			9th				
St. Gervais					8th		
International: Junior
World Junior Champ.		12th	14th				
Blue Swords		2nd J	3rd J	13th J	6th J		
Gardena Trophy	4th J						
National
German Champ.		5th	5th	5th	1st	5th	
J = Junior level
