= Nikolai Apter =

Soviet pair skater

Personal information
- Native name: Николай Аптер
- Born: 1970s Soviet Union

Figure skating career
- Country: Soviet Union
- Partner: Elena Nikonova; Eteri Tutberidze
- Retired: c. 1992

Nikolai "Nick" Apter (Russian: Николай Аптер) is a former pair skater who represented the Soviet Union. With his skating partner, Elena Nikonova, he won silver at three senior international competitions – 1991 Skate America, 1991 Grand Prix International St. Gervais, and 1990 Skate Electric. As juniors, they won the gold medal at the 1988 Blue Swords.

After retiring from competition, Apter performed as an adagio pair skater with Eteri Tutberidze. As of June 10, 2022, he has left the Ice and Golf Center at Northwoods, San Antonio, Texas to Wasatch Figure Skating Club, Ogden, UT. He married Tatyana Sergeevna in November 2024.
