= Mario Liebers =

German former competitive figure skater (born 1960)

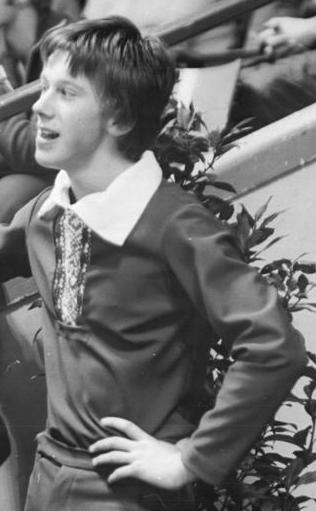
- Mario Liebers at the Blue Swords in November 1976

Personal information
- Born: 1 January 1960 (age 66) Dresden, East Germany
- Home town: Berlin, Germany

Figure skating career
- Country: East Germany
- Skating club: SC Dynamo Berlin
- Retired: 1980

Mario Liebers (born 1 January 1960) is a German former competitive figure skater who represented East Germany. He is the 1977 Blue Swords champion, the 1978 Prize of Moscow News bronze medalist, and a five-time East German national silver medalist. He finished in the top ten at the 1978 World Championships and at three European Championships.

After retiring from competition, Liebers became a dentist based in Berlin. He and his wife Kerstin, a former sprinter, are the parents of German figure skaters Martin Liebers (born in 1985) and Peter Liebers (born in 1988).

== Competitive highlights ==
International
Event	73–74	74–75	75–76	76–77	77–78	78–79	79–80
World Champ.					9th	14th	12th
European Champ.			11th	8th	6th	8th	7th
Blue Swords				2nd	1st		
Moscow News	5th					3rd	
National
East Germany			2nd	2nd	2nd	2nd	2nd
