= Ingrid Lehmann =

German figure skating coach

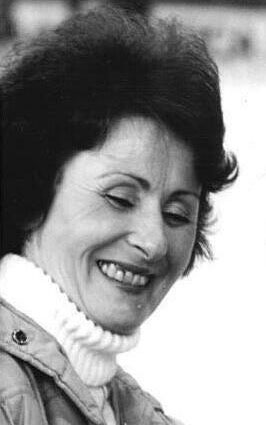
Lehmann in 1982

Ingrid Lehmann is a former East German figure skater and coach, who taught Simone Koch and Hermann Schulz in the 1980s in Berlin.

Ingrid Lehmann coached a lot of skaters at the department figure skating of the “Eissportclub Dresden (ESCD)". She was a former coach-in-chef for figure skating in East Germany.

Ingrid Lehmann is graduated sport-teacher and member of the scientific council of the program “Sports Management” of the "European Institute for postgraduate Studies at the Technische Universität Dresden" (EIPOS) founded by Günther Landgraf. She is married to Prof. Günter Lehmann.
