= Alexander Tikhomirov =

Russian former pair skater (born 1947)

Personal information
- Native name: Александр Константинович Тихомиров
- Full name: Alexander Konstantinovich Tikhomirov
- Born: 3 January 1947 (age 79) Moscow, Soviet Union

Figure skating career
- Country: Soviet Union
- Partner: Lyudmila Suslina

Alexander Konstantinovich Tikhomirov (Russian: Александр Константинович Тихомиров; born 3 January 1947) is a Russian former pair skater who represented the Soviet Union. With Lyudmila Suslina, he is the 1968 Winter Universiade bronze medalist. The pair also won silver at the 1967 Blue Swords, silver at the 1967 Prize of Moscow News, and gold at the 1968 Blue Swords.
