= Tikhomirov (crater) =

Crater on the Moon

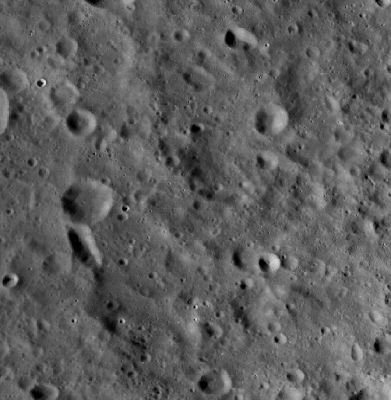
- LRO WAC image
- Coordinates: 25.2°N 162.0°E
- Diameter: 65 km
- Depth: Unknown
- Colongitude: 198° at sunrise
- Eponym: Nikolaj I. Tikhomirov

Tikhomorov is the heavily eroded remains of a lunar impact crater on the Moon's far side. It lies to the northeast of the smaller crater Konstantinov, and to the southwest of Trumpler. Farther to the west-northwest is Mare Moscoviense, one of the few maria on the far side of the Moon.

This crater has been so heavily eroded by subsequent impacts that there is little to distinguish it from the nearby terrain. A slight depression in the surface and traces of the outer rim can be discerned, but it is otherwise identical to much of the remainder of the battered far side.

He crater is named after Nikolai Ivanovich Tikhomirov, a Russian Soviet chemical engineer and pioneer in rocket technology.

== Satellite craters ==
By convention these features are identified on lunar maps by placing the letter on the side of the crater midpoint that is closest to Tikhomirov.

Tikhomirov	Latitude	Longitude	Diameter
J	20.9° N	165.7° E	29 km
K	21.3° N	163.9° E	23 km
N	21.1° N	161.4° E	18 km
R	24.1° N	160.3° E	21 km
T	25.4° N	158.8° E	26 km
X	27.3° N	160.6° E	24 km
Y	28.3° N	160.3° E	20 km
