= Simone Koch =

German figure skater (born 1969)

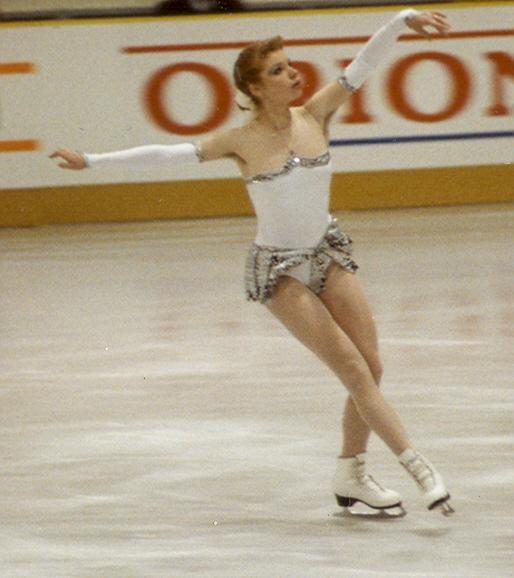
- Simone Koch-Schnabel at the 1992 German Championships in Unna

Personal information
- Other names: Simone Schnabel
- Born: 25 October 1969 (age 56) Dresden, East Germany

Figure skating career
- Country: East Germany; Germany
- Retired: 1993
Medal record
Representing East Germany
Figure skating: Ladies' singles
World Junior Championships
Gold medal – first place	1983 Sarajevo	Ladies' singles
Silver medal – second place	1984 Sapporo	Ladies' singles

Simone Schnabel (née Koch; born 25 October 1969) is a German former competitive figure skater. She is the 1983 World Junior champion and represented East Germany at the 1988 Winter Olympics in Calgary.

== Career ==
Koch learned her first triple jumps with coach Ingeburg Walter at the Dresdner EC. Later she was coached by Ingrid Lehmann in Berlin. She represented the GDR and her club was SC Einheit Berlin.

Koch won the World Junior Championships in 1983, at the age of 14. In 1984, she was awarded the silver medal at the World Junior Championships, placing behind another East German, Karin Hendschke.

Koch won the silver medal at the 1984 East German Championships behind Katarina Witt. She placed 4th at the 1985 European Championships.

In 1988, Koch won her second silver medal, again behind Witt, at the German Championships. She was sent to the 1988 Winter Olympics and placed 9th.

In 1989, Koch was one of the favourites for the European Championships, but she lost the qualifying competition in East Germany versus Evelyn Großmann and Simone Lang.

In 1992 and 1993, following German reunification, Koch attempted to qualify for international championships, but was unsuccessful.

== Personal life ==
Koch married Günther Schnabel and took his surname. Their daughter, Lisa-Maria, was born in 1990.

== Results ==
International
Event	82–83 (GDR)	83–84 (GDR)	84–85 (GDR)	85–86 (GDR)	86–87 (GDR)	87–88 (GDR)	88–89 (GDR)	89–90 (GDR)	91–92 (GER)	92–93 (GER)
Olympics						9th				
Worlds			14th	12th		8th				
Europeans		7th	4th			5th				
Moscow News							5th			
NHK Trophy							5th			
Prague Skate			3rd					2nd		
International: Junior
Junior Worlds	1st	2nd								
National
Germany									6th	7th
East Germany		2nd	3rd	3rd	3rd	2nd	3rd			
