= Uwe Kagelmann =

East German pair skater

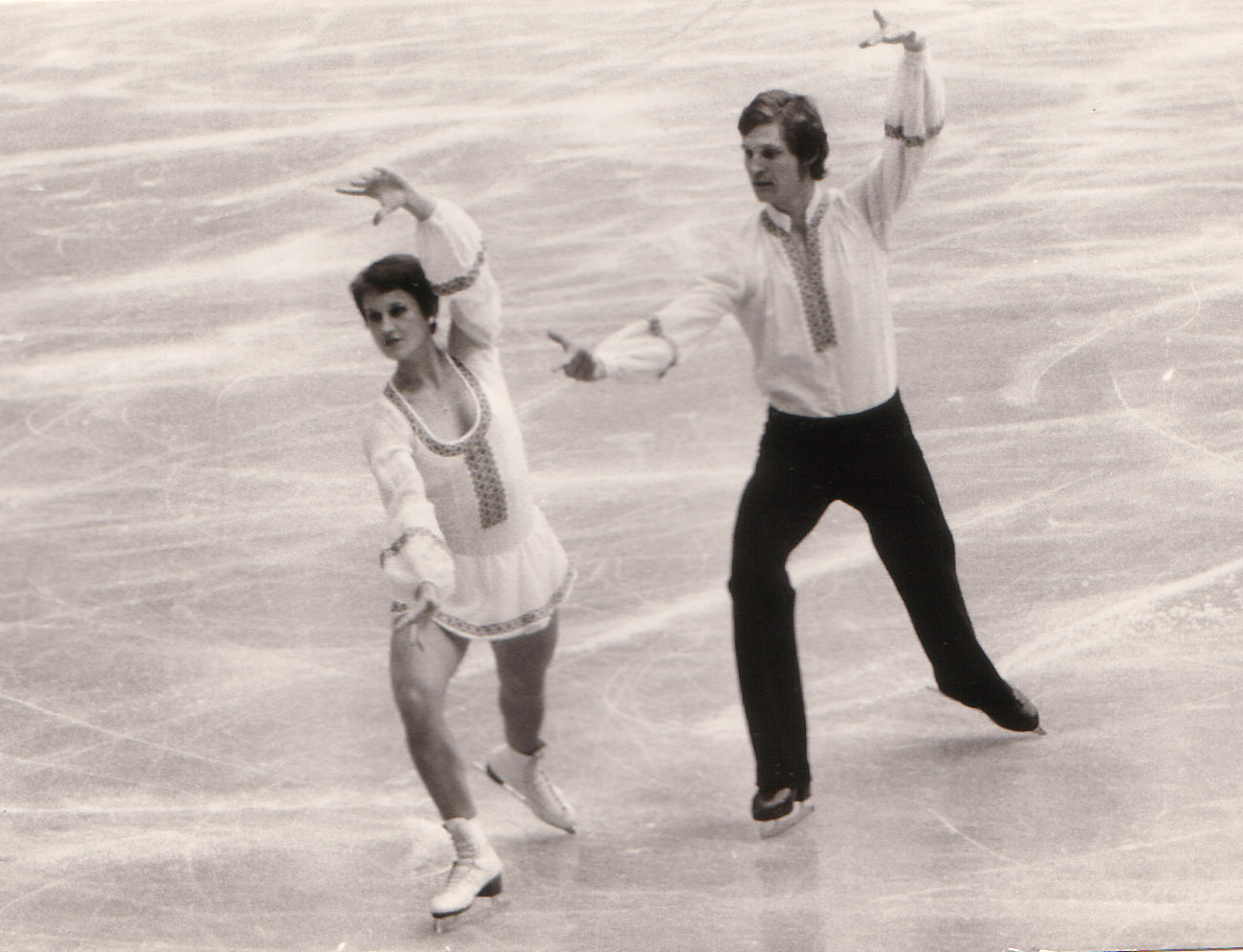
- Manuela Groß and Uwe Kagelmann at the ISU-Show 1976 in Berlin

Personal information
- Born: 6 September 1950 (age 75) Dresden, Saxony, East Germany

Figure skating career
- Country: East Germany
- Skating club: SC Dynamo Berlin
- Retired: 1976
Medal record
Representing East Germany
Pairs' figure skating
Olympic Games
Bronze medal – third place	1976 Innsbruck	Pairs
Bronze medal – third place	1972 Sapporo	Pairs
World Championships
Bronze medal – third place	1975 Colorado Springs	Pairs
Bronze medal – third place	1973 Bratislava	Pairs
European Championships
Bronze medal – third place	1975 Copenhagen	Pairs
Bronze medal – third place	1972 Gothenburg	Pairs

Uwe Kagelmann (born 6 September 1950 in Dresden, Saxony, East Germany/GDR) is a German former competitive pair skater. Competing with Manuela Groß, he was a two-time bronze medalist at the Olympics. He later became a figure skating coach.

The pair skated for the SV Dynamo club and represented East Germany. Their coach was Heinz-Friedrich Lindner. He now works as a figure skating coach at the Feldkircher Eislauf Verein Montfort club in Austria.

== Results ==
pairs with Groß

International
Event	68–69	69–70	70–71	71–72	72–73	73–74	74–75	75–76
Olympics				3rd				3rd
Worlds		7th	4th	4th	3rd	4th	3rd	4th
Europeans	7th	7th	4th	3rd	4th	4th	3rd	4th
Blue Swords		2nd	1st		1st	1st	2nd	1st
National
East Germany	2nd	2nd	1st	1st		1st	2nd	2nd

== See also ==
- World Figure Skating Championships
