= Nikolai Tikhomirov (chemical engineer) =

Russian and Soviet rocket engineer

- Николай Тихомиров
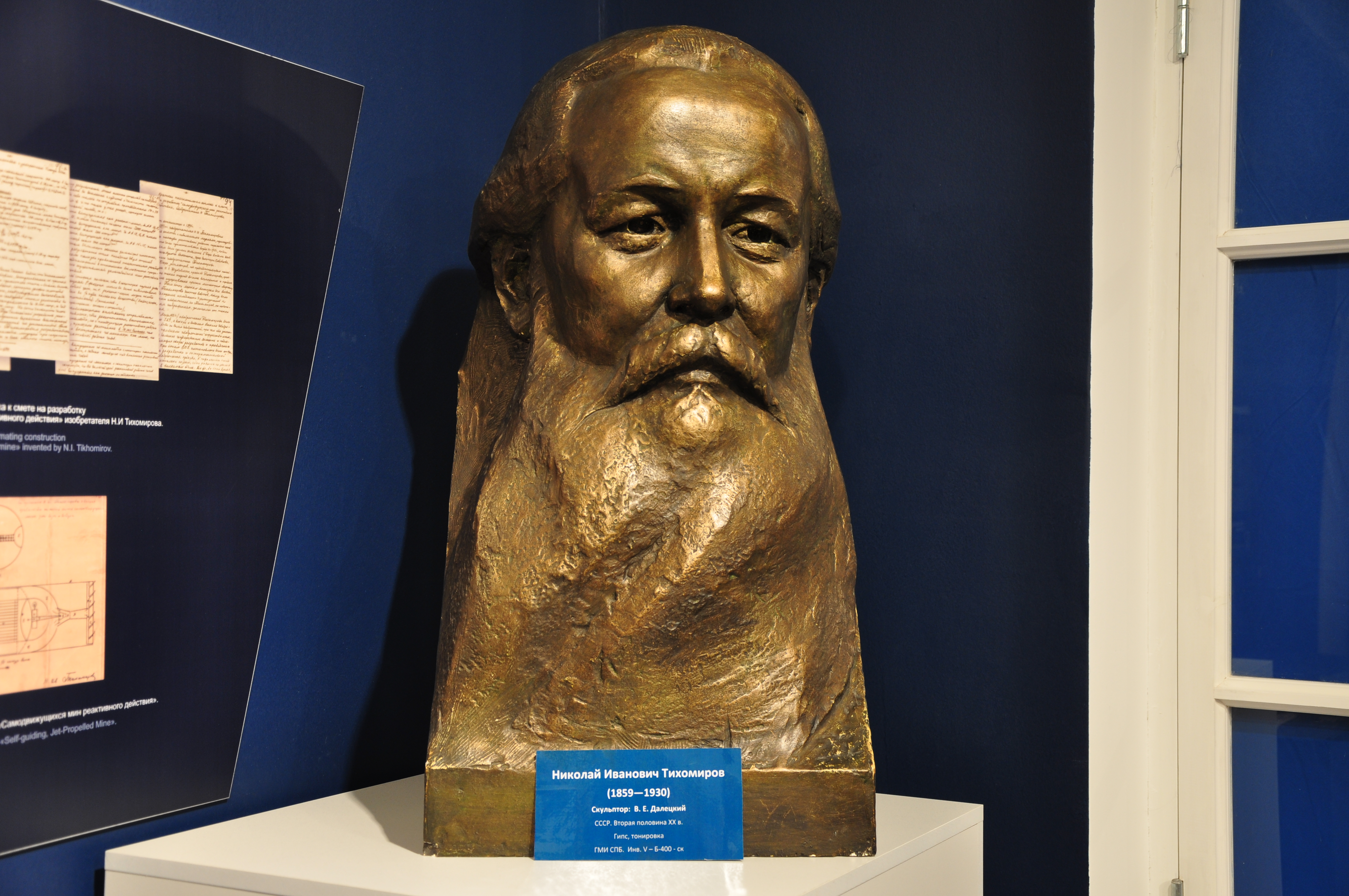
- Bust of Nikolai Ivanovich Tikhomirov. Saint Petersburg. Museum of rocket science.
- Born: November 1859; Moscow
- Died: 28 April 1930 (aged 70); Leningrad
- Known for: founder of the Gas Dynamics Laboratory
- Awards: Hero of Socialist Labor
- Scientific career
- Fields: specialist in rocket technology

Nikolai Ivanovich Tikhomirov (Russian: Николай Иванович Тихомиров; born Nikolai Viktorovich Slyotov; November 1859 – 28 April 1930) was a Russian and Soviet chemical engineer, inventor, founder of the Gas Dynamics Laboratory, specialist in rocket technology and one of the inventors of the Katyusha, which he was awarded the Hero of Socialist Labor (1991, posthumously). A crater on the far side of the Moon is named after him.

== Biography ==
Born in November 1859 in Moscow, to a noble family of a real state councilor. His birth name was Nikolai Viktorovich Slyotov. In the 1880s, he took a pseudonym for himself, the name of his childhood friend Nikolai, the son of the merchant Ivan Tikhomirov. Subsequently, the pseudonym became his official surname.

=== Early years ===
After graduating from the lyceum, he studied at the chemical department of the Faculty of Physics and Mathematics of the Imperial Moscow University. After graduation, he worked in the technical laboratory of the Imperial Moscow University and at Kiev University in the laboratory of Professor Nikolai Bunge, who gave popular lectures on the production of "nutritional and flavoring substances".

From the mid-1880s, he worked in various fields of industry, first as an assistant to the director of the Association of the Babkin Brothers Kupavinskaya cloth factory in the Bogorodsky Uyezd of Moscow Governorate. Based on the experience gained, he wrote a three-volume educational work. In 1886, the Moscow printing house of L. F. Snegirev printed the first volume of "Technology of woolen production in the VI parts with a separate large atlas of machines and apparatus", the 2nd volume "Finishing the cloth" and the 3rd volume "Artificial wool and wool carbonization. The Babkin brothers, having learned about this, regarded the publication of books as a direct threat to their production, fired their assistant and banned the publication of these books.

Tikhomirov left for Ukraine, where he worked first as an intern, and then as chief chemist and director of sugar distilleries of the two largest sugar beet and refining corporations of the Russian Empire - the Tereshchenko Brothers Partnership and the Brodsky Alexander Partnership. In 1893 he published the book "Analysis of sugary substances. A Practical Guide to the Chemical Investigation of Materials and Products of Beet Sugar Production” and “Reference Book and Guide to Beet Sugar Production”.In addition, he received patents for his own inventions: for new methods of sugar production; on marching mobile centers for the army; on a device that uses the heat of flue gases to heat and purify water with the associated destruction of smoke. Tikhomirov also invented filters with automatic washing of the filter material for sugar, distilleries, oil mills and other plants. The filters have been widely used at home and abroad.

=== Early rocket research ===
Since 1894, Tikhomirov has been working on the problem of creating rocket projectiles - "self-propelled mines of reactive action", until 1897 "conducted experiments with small models moving in water using the jet work of powder gases ...". Once, while conducting chemical experiments in the laboratory, he injured his right arm and left leg from an explosion, because of which "he was released from military service forever."

In 1909, Tikhomirov returned to Moscow to develop "numerous research and inventions accumulated over many years ... scientific and practical work." He made a schematic development and the necessary calculations of "self-propelled mines". Tikhomirov suggested using the reaction of gases during the combustion of flammable liquids or explosives in combination with an ejected air medium to propel a rocket. In 1912, he submitted his project to the Minister of the Navy, Admiral Aleksei Birilev for consideration. The project was reported to the emperor. Nicholas II personally came to the test, ordered the work to be continued and allocated the necessary funding. In November 1915, Tikhomirov applied for a patent to the Technical Affairs Committee of the Department of Industry of the Ministry of Trade and Industry, which issued him a protective certificate No. 309 (without disclosure) for a type of "self-propelled mines for water and air."

N.I. Tikhomirov's agent in those years was Dr. Slyotov, who filed petitions for the invention to various authorities. On 11 February 1916, he received a positive conclusion from the expert commission, which was signed by Nikolay Zhukovsky, Chairman of the Inventions Department of the Moscow Military Industrial Committee. In conclusion, it was noted: "The invention consists in setting in motion water and air torpedoes by sequential ignition of cartridges with slow-burning gunpowder ... The calculation shows that such an action of such torpedoes is quite possible ...". However, on 23 March 1916, based on the opinion of the expert Alexey Schastny, a decision was made: “... to refuse to issue a privilege on the basis of Art. 75 of the Charter on Industry ... ".

=== Founder of the Gas Dynamics Laboratory ===
After the October Revolution, Tikhomirov remained in Russia. In May 1919, he turned to Vladimir Bonch-Bruyevich, manager of the Council of People's Commissars of the Russian Soviet Federative Socialist Republic, about his invention of "a special type of air and water self-propelled mines." The invention was subjected to new examinations.

In the spring of 1920, Tikhomirov and his closest assistant, Vladimir Artemyev, set up a small mechanical workshop on Tikhvinskaya Street in Moscow, where they conducted the first experiments with black powder. The engineers maintained the workshop with their own money, as well as the funds that they received from the sale of bicycle accessories and children's toys made in the workshop. On 1 March 1921, at the initiative of Tikhomirov, the workshop was transformed into a laboratory for the study and design of rocket technology, the main focus of which was the creation of solid rockets. In the same year, the inventors began to develop rockets for aircraft.

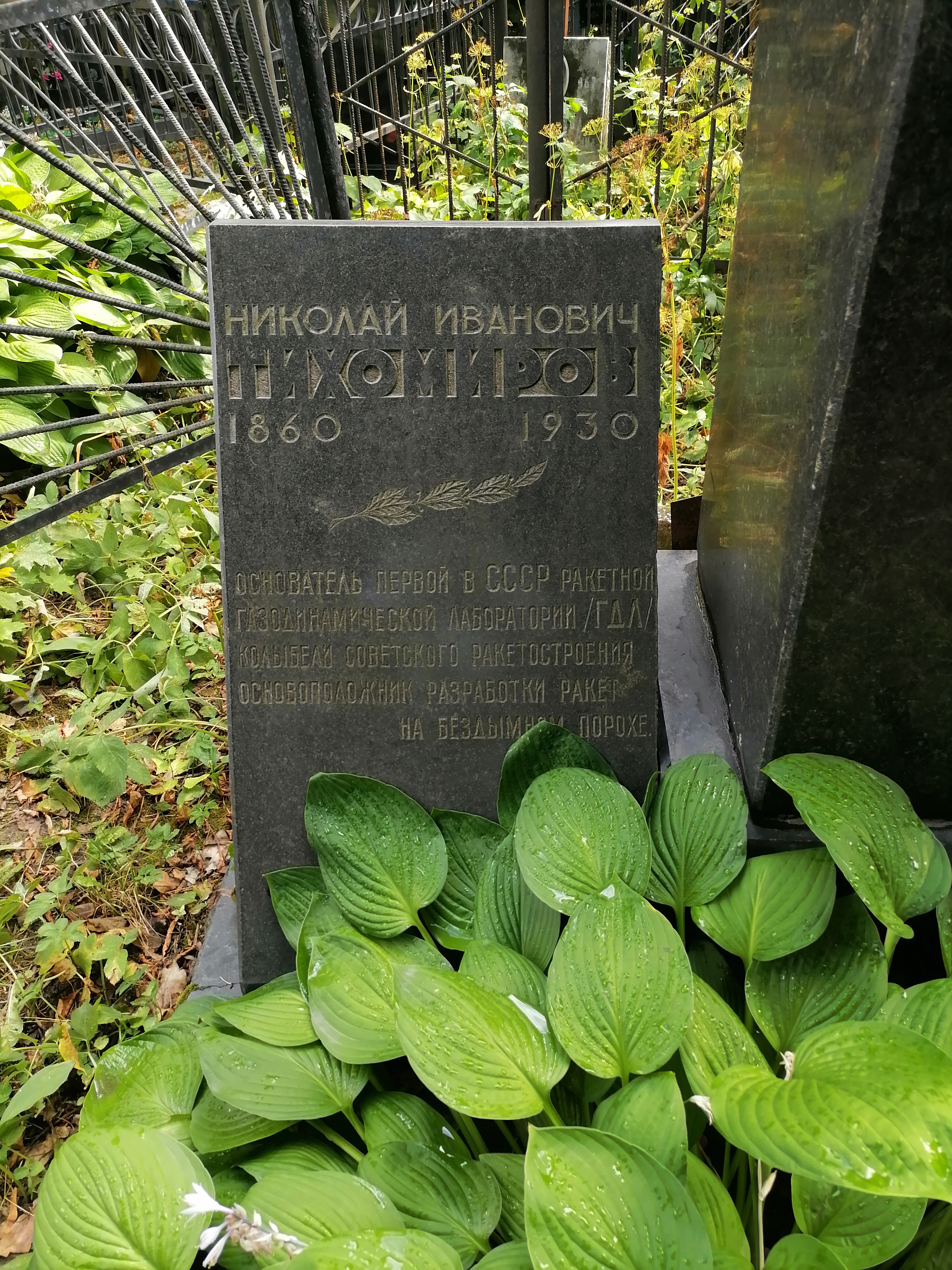
Memorial plate at the Vagankovo Cemetery

With the assistance of the Commander-in-Chief of the Armed Forces of the Soviet Republic Sergey Kamenev, who instructed to allocate funding for Tikhomirov's workshop, on 1 March 1921, the country's first research and development organization for the development of smokeless powder shells began its work at the military department - " Laboratory for the development of inventions by N. I. Tikhomirov. In 1924, under the leadership of N.I. Tikhomirov, a recipe for smokeless pyroxylin powder was created on a non-volatile solvent - TNT, which differs from black smoke powder in powerful and stable combustion. In 1925 Tikhomirov's laboratory moved to Leningrad. On 3 March 1928, the first launch of a rocket on smokeless powder was carried out at one of the training grounds in the Leningrad region, which had a range of about 1,300 metres. This design served as the foundation for the creation of rockets for the famous Katyusha rocket launcher. In July 1928, the laboratory of N. I. Tikhomirov was renamed the Gas Dynamics Laboratory (GDL) of the Military Scientific Committee under the Revolutionary Military Council of the USSR.

Under the leadership of Tikhomirov he personally prepared calculations and drawings of a 3-inch rocket projectile. Equipment for pressing powder cartridges were made, more than 200 experimental nozzles were manufactured and tested in the search for optimal sizes, numerous experiments were carried out on gunpowder in a non-volatile solvent, and much more. Tikhomirov was the author of important theoretical works in the field of rocket technology, including: "Determination of the most favorable burning time of gunpowder in a rocket projectile", "Rocket flight" and "External ballistics of rocket projectiles".

Nikolai Ivanovich Tikhomirov died on 28 April 1930 in Leningrad.

He was buried in Moscow, at the Vagankovo Cemetery. The burial place was lost; in 1971 a symbolic tomb monument to Tikhomirov was erected at the cemetery.

== Awards and recognition ==
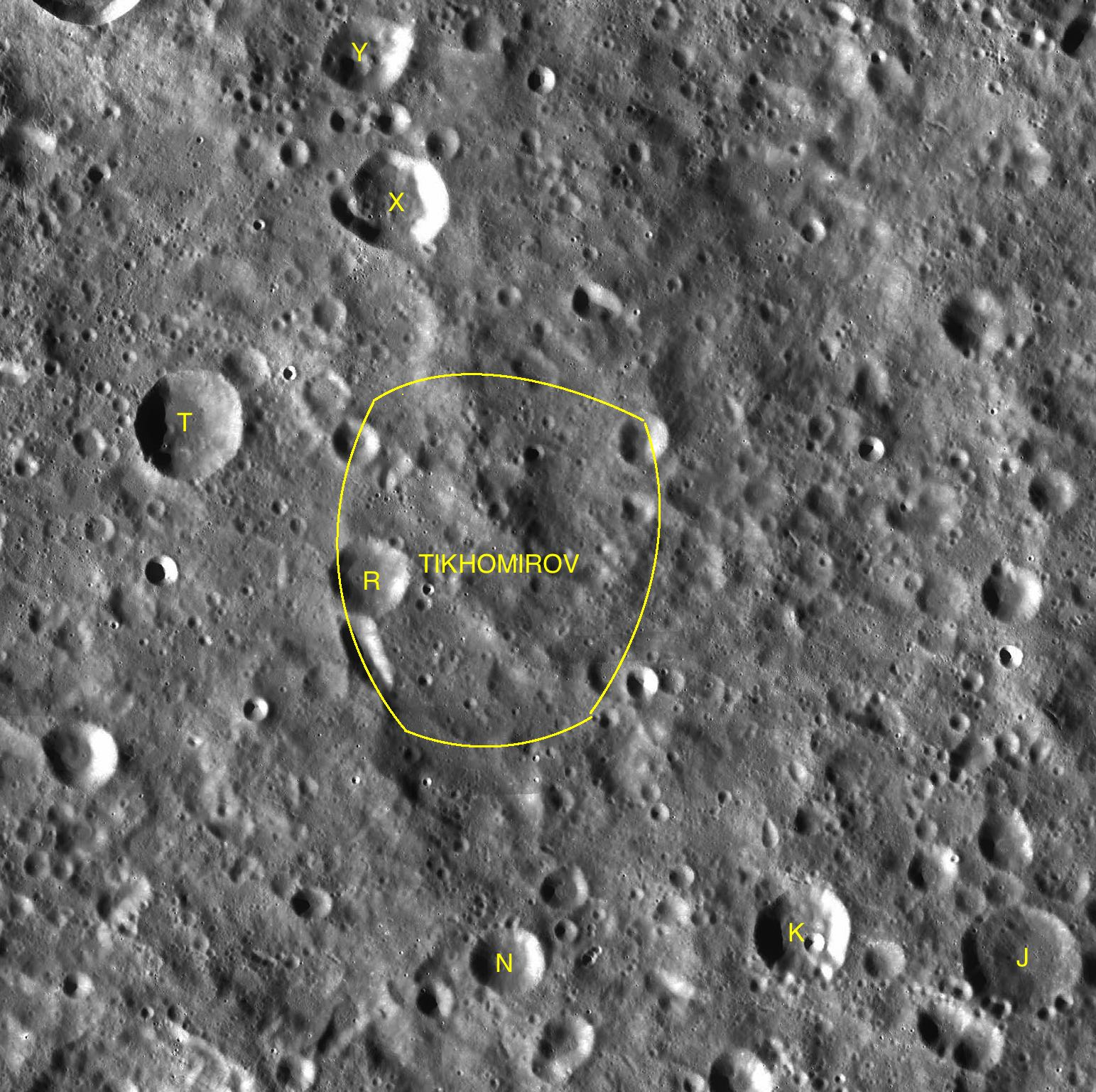
lunar impact crater on the Moon's far side named after Tikhomirov

- In 1970, the International Astronomical Union named a crater on the far side of the Moon after Tikhomirov.
- In 1987, in Leningrad, on Nevsky Prospekt, on the wall of house 92, a memorial plaque was installed (architect V. S. Vasilkovsky) on which it is written: “In this house from 1926 to 1930, Nikolai Ivanovich Tikhomirov, the founder of the Gas Dynamic Laboratory, lived and worked, the first in the USSR research and development organization for the development of rocket technology.
- Tikhomirov and other participants in the creation of the famous rocket weapon of the Second World War, the Katyusha rocket launcher, received official recognition only in 1991. By decree of the President of the USSR Mikhail Gorbachev dated 21 June 1991, I. T. Kleymenov, G. E. Langemak, V. N. Luzhin, B. S. Petropavlovsky, B. M. Slonimer and N. I. Tikhomirov were posthumously awarded title of Heroes of Socialist Labor.
