= 1986 European Figure Skating Championships =

Figure skating competition

1986 European Championships
- Type: ISU Championship
- Date: January 28 – February 2
- Season: 1985–86
- Location: Copenhagen, Denmark
- Venue: Brøndbyhallen

Champions
- Men's singles: (Czechoslovakia) Jozef Sabovčík
- Ladies' singles: (East Germany) Katarina Witt
- Pairs: (Soviet Union) Elena Valova / Oleg Vasiliev
- Ice dance: (Soviet Union) Natalia Bestemianova / Andrei Bukin
- Previous: 1985 European Championships
- Next: 1987 European Championships

The 1986 European Figure Skating Championships was a senior-level international competition held in Copenhagen, Denmark from January 28 to February 2, 1986. Elite skaters from European ISU member nations competed in the disciplines of men's singles, ladies' singles, pair skating, and ice dancing.

== Competition notes ==
Jozef Sabovcik of Czechoslovakia landed a quadruple toe loop. It was recognized at the event but then ruled invalid three weeks later due to a touchdown with his free foot.

== Results ==
=== Men ===
Rank	Name	Nation	TFP	CF	SP	FS	S+F
1	Jozef Sabovčík	Czechoslovakia	2.0	1	1	1	1
2	Vladimir Kotin	Soviet Union	5.2	4	2	2	2
3	Alexander Fadeev	Soviet Union	5.4	2	3	3	3
4	Viktor Petrenko	Soviet Union	9.8	5	7	4	4
5	Grzegorz Filipowski	Poland	12.0	6	6	6	5
6	Falko Kirsten	East Germany	14.6	10	9	5	6
7	Petr Barna	Czechoslovakia	14.8	8	5	8	7
8	Laurent Depouilly	France	16.4	9	10	7	8
9	Richard Zander	West Germany	18.0	7	12	9	9
10	Lars Akesson	Sweden	20.8	11	8	11	10
11	Philippe Roncoli	France	23.4	13	14	10	11
12	Lars Dresler	Denmark	28.6	19	13	12	12
13	Nils Köpp	East Germany	28.6	14	18	13	13
14	Oliver Höner	Switzerland	29.8	12	19	15	16
15	Thomas Hlavik	Austria	31.0	17	17	14	14
16	Alessandro Riccitelli	Italy	32.4	15	11	19	17
17	András Száraz	Hungary	34.0	20	15	16	15
18	Stephen Pickavance	United Kingdom	34.6	16	20	17	18
19	Oula Jääskeläinen	Finland	37.2	18	21	18	19
Semi-final
20	Peter Johansson	Sweden	22.6	22	16	3	2
21	Tomislav Cizmesija	Yugoslavia	27.2	21	24	5	5
22	Boyko Aleksiev	Bulgaria	29.6	24	23	6	6
23	Fernando Soria	Spain	29.6	23	22	7	7
WD	Heiko Fischer	West Germany		3	4		

=== Ladies ===
Rank	Name	Nation	TFP	CF	SP	FS	S+F
1	Katarina Witt	East Germany	3.4	2	3	1	1
2	Kira Ivanova	Soviet Union	4.4	1	2	3	3
3	Anna Kondrashova	Soviet Union	4.8	4	1	2	2
4	Natalia Lebedeva	Soviet Union	9.4	5	6	4	4
5	Claudia Leistner	West Germany	10.4	3	4	7	6
6	Claudia Villiger	Switzerland	14.6	9	8	6	7
7	Susan Jackson	United Kingdom	16.8	10	7	8	8
8	Constanze Gensel	East Germany	17.2	17	5	5	5
9	Agnès Gosselin	France	17.2	7	10	8	8
10	Susanne Becher	West Germany	18.4	8	9	10	10
11	Joanne Conway	United Kingdom	22.0	11	11	11	11
12	Cornelia Tesch	West Germany	22.8	6	13	14	14
13	Lotta Falkenbäck	Sweden	27.0	15	15	12	13
14	Tamara Téglássy	Hungary	27.4	16	12	13	12
15	Elise Ahonen	Finland	30.0	13	18	15	16
16	Željka Čižmešija	Yugoslavia	32.8	12	19	18	18
17	Li Scha Wang	Netherlands	33.6	20	14	16	15
18	Manuela Tschupp	Switzerland	34.2	14	17	19	19
19	Beatrice Gelmini	Italy	34.8	19	16	17	17
Semi-final
20	Florence Copp	France	1.8	18	20	1	3
21	Sandra Escoda	Spain	26.4	22	23	4	4
22	Anita Thorenfeldt	Norway	27.0	21	21	6	6
23	Petya Gavazova	Bulgaria	27.6	23	22	5	5

=== Pairs ===
Rank	Name	Nation	TFP	SP	FS
1	Elena Valova / Oleg Vasiliev	Soviet Union	1.4	1	1
2	Ekaterina Gordeeva / Sergei Grinkov	Soviet Union	2.8	2	2
3	Elena Bechke / Valeri Kornienko	Soviet Union	4.6	4	3
4	Katrin Kanitz / Tobias Schröter	East Germany	5.2	3	4
5	Manuela Landgraf / Ingo Steuer	East Germany	7.0	5	5
6	Lenka Knapová / René Novotný	Czechoslovakia	8.8	7	6
7	Marianne Ocvirek / Holger Maletz	West Germany	9.4	6	7
8	Sylvie Vacquero / Didier Manaud	France	11.6	9	8
9	Kerstin Kimminus / Stefan Pfrengle	West Germany	12.2	8	9
10	Cheryl Peake / Andrew Naylor	United Kingdom	14.0	10	10

=== Ice dancing ===
Rank	Name	Nation	TFP	CD	OSP	FD
1	Natalia Bestemianova / Andrei Bukin	Soviet Union	2.4	1	2	1
2	Marina Klimova / Sergei Ponomarenko	Soviet Union	3.6	2	1	2
3	Natalia Annenko / Genrikh Sretenski	Soviet Union	6.0	3	3	3
4	Kathrin Beck / Christoff Beck	Austria	8.0	4	4	4
5	Antonia Becherer / Ferdinand Becherer	West Germany	10.0	5	5	5
6	Klára Engi / Attila Tóth	Hungary	12.6	7	6	6
7	Isabella Micheli / Roberto Pelizzola	Italy	14.4	6	7	8
8	Isabelle Duchesnay / Paul Duchesnay	France	15.0	8	8	7
9	Sharon Jones / Paul Askham	United Kingdom	18.4	9	10	9
10	Viera Řeháková / Ivan Havránek	Czechoslovakia	19.6	10	9	10
11	Elizabeth Coates / Alan Abretti	United Kingdom	23.0	12	12	11
12	Stefania Calegari / Pasquale Camerlengo	Italy	23.0	11	11	12
13	Kinga Wertan / Janos Demeter	Hungary	26.0	13	13	13
14	Claudia Schmidlin / Daniel Schmidlin	Switzerland	28.0	14	14	14
15	Andrea Weppelmann / Hendryk Schamberger	West Germany	30.0	15	15	15
16	Christina Boianova / Yavor Ivanov	Bulgaria	33.0	17	17	16
17	Beata Kawełczyk / Tomasz Politański	Poland	33.0	16	16	17
18	Susanna Rahkamo / Petri Kokko	Finland	36.0	18	18	18
