= 1987 European Figure Skating Championships =

Figure skating competition

1987 European Championships
- Type: ISU Championship
- Date: February 3 – 8
- Season: 1986–87
- Location: Sarajevo, Yugoslavia
- Venue: Zetra Olympics Hall

Champions
- Men's singles: (Soviet Union) Alexander Fadeev
- Ladies' singles: (East Germany) Katarina Witt
- Pairs: (Soviet Union) Larisa Selezneva / Oleg Makarov
- Ice dance: (Soviet Union) Natalia Bestemianova / Andrei Bukin
- Previous: 1986 European Championships
- Next: 1988 European Championships

The 1987 European Figure Skating Championships was a senior-level international competition held in Sarajevo, Yugoslavia (present-day Bosnia and Herzegovina) on February 3–8, 1987. Elite skaters from European ISU member nations competed in the disciplines of men's singles, ladies' singles, pair skating, and ice dancing.

== Results ==
=== Men ===
Rank	Name	Nation	TFP	CF	OP	FS
1	Alexander Fadeev	Soviet Union	2.0	1	1	1
2	Vladimir Kotin	Soviet Union	4.6	3	2	2
3	Viktor Petrenko	Soviet Union	5.6	2	3	3
4	Grzegorz Filipowski	Poland	11.4			
5	Falko Kirsten	East Germany	12.8			
6	Richard Zander	West Germany	13.2	4		
7	Philippe Roncoli	France	15.2			
8	Petr Barna	Czechoslovakia	15.4			
9	Oliver Höner	Switzerland	17.0			
10	Frédéric Harpagès	France	17.4			
11	Paul Robinson	United Kingdom				
12	Oula Jääskeläinen	Finland				
13	Thomas Hlavik	Austria				
14	Peter Johansson	Sweden				
15	Alessandro Riccitelli	Italy				
16	Tomislav Čižmešija	Yugoslavia				
17	Ralf Burghart	Austria				
18	Lars Dresler	Denmark				
19	András Száraz	Hungary				
20	Przemysław Noworyta	Poland				
21	Jaroslav Suchý	Czechoslovakia				
22	Boyko Aleksiev	Bulgaria				
23	Fernando Soria	Spain				

=== Ladies ===
Rank	Name	Nation	TFP	CF	OP	FS
1	Katarina Witt	East Germany	3.8	4	1	1
2	Kira Ivanova	Soviet Union		1	3	
3	Anna Kondrashova	Soviet Union		3	2	
4	Claudia Leistner	West Germany		2	4	4
5	Susanne Becher	West Germany				
6	Claudia Villiger	Switzerland				
7	Tamara Téglássy	Hungary				
8	Natalia Skrabnevskaya	Soviet Union				
9	Iveta Voralová	Czechoslovakia				
10	Agnès Gosselin	France				
11	Željka Čižmešija	Yugoslavia				
12	Gina Fulton	United Kingdom				
13	Helene Persson	Sweden				
14	Yvonne Pokorny	Austria				
15	Stéfanie Schmid	Switzerland				
16	Beatrice Gelmini	Italy				
17	Tiia-Riikka Pietikainen	Finland				
18	Mirela Gawłowska	Poland				
19	Anita Thorenfeldt	Norway				
20	Sandra Escoda	Spain				
21	Petya Gavazova	Bulgaria				

=== Pairs ===
Rank	Name	Nation	TFP	SP	FS
1	Larisa Selezneva / Oleg Makarov	Soviet Union	1.8	2	1
2	Elena Valova / Oleg Vasiliev	Soviet Union	2.4	1	2
3	Katrin Kanitz / Tobias Schröter	East Germany	4.6	4	3
4	Lenka Knapová / René Novotný	Czechoslovakia	6.0	5	4
5	Cheryl Peake / Andrew Naylor	United Kingdom	7.4	6	5
6	Sonja Adalbert / Daniele Caprano	West Germany	9.2	8	6
7	Lisa Cushley / Neil Cushley	United Kingdom	9.8	7	7
8	Charline Mauger / Benoît Vandenberghe	France	11.6	9	8
WD	Ekaterina Gordeeva / Sergei Grinkov	Soviet Union		3	

=== Ice dancing ===
Rank	Name	Nation
1	Natalia Bestemianova / Andrei Bukin	Soviet Union
2	Marina Klimova / Sergei Ponomarenko	Soviet Union
3	Natalia Annenko / Genrikh Sretenski	Soviet Union
4	Kathrin Beck / Christoff Beck	Austria
5	Isabelle Duchesnay / Paul Duchesnay	France
6	Klára Engi / Attila Tóth	Hungary
7	Antonia Becherer / Ferdinand Becherer	West Germany
8	Sharon Jones / Paul Askham	United Kingdom
9	Lia Trovati / Roberto Pelizzola	Italy
10	Viera Řeháková / Ivan Havránek	Czechoslovakia
11	Corinne Paliard / Didier Courtois	France
12	Elizabeth Coates / Alan Abretti	United Kingdom
13	Stefania Calegari / Pasquale Camerlengo	Italy
14	Honorata Górna / Andrzej Dostatni	Poland
15	Andrea Weppelmann / Hendryk Schamberger	West Germany
16	Andrea Juklova / Martin Šimeček	Czechoslovakia
17	Kinga Wertan / Janos Demeter	Hungary
18	Susanna Rahkamo / Petri Kokko	Finland
19	Christina Boianova / Yavor Ivanov	Bulgaria
20	Desiree Schlegel / Patrik Brecht	Switzerland
21	Ursula Holik / Herbert Holik	Austria

== Sources ==
- ISU Results book vol.II p 222-226
