= Cushley =

Cushley is a surname. Notable people with the surname include:

- David Cushley (born 1989), Northern Ireland footballer
- Tam Cushley (born 1979), British and Based
- John Cushley (1943–2008), Scottish footballer
- Leo Cushley (born 1961), Scottish Roman Catholic archbishop
- Lisa Cushley (born 1969), English pair skater
- Neil Cushley (born 1967), English pair skater
