= 1991 European Figure Skating Championships =

Figure skating competition

1991 European Championships
- Type: ISU Championship
- Date: 22 – 27 January
- Season: 1990–91
- Location: Sofia, Bulgaria
- Venue: Winter Sports Palace

Champions
- Men's singles: (Soviet Union) Viktor Petrenko
- Ladies' singles: (France) Surya Bonaly
- Pairs: (Soviet Union) Natalia Mishkutenok / Artur Dmitriev
- Ice dance: (Soviet Union) Marina Klimova / Sergei Ponomarenko
- Previous: 1990 European Championships
- Next: 1992 European Championships

The 1991 European Figure Skating Championships was a senior-level international competition held in Sofia, Bulgaria on 22–27 January 1991. Elite skaters from European ISU member nations competed in the disciplines of men's singles, ladies' singles, pair skating, and ice dancing.

== Results ==
=== Men ===
Rank	Name	Nation
1	Viktor Petrenko	Soviet Union
2	Petr Barna	Czechoslovakia
3	Viacheslav Zagorodniuk	Soviet Union
4	Éric Millot	France
5	Philippe Candeloro	France
6	Alexei Urmanov	Soviet Union
7	Mirko Eichhorn	Germany
8	Steven Cousins	United Kingdom
9	Oliver Höner	Switzerland
10	Daniel Weiss	Germany
11	Ronny Winkler	Germany
12	Oula Jääskeläinen	Finland
13	Alessandro Riccitelli	Italy
14	Cornel Gheorghe	Romania
15	Henrik Walentin	Denmark
16	Jan Erik Digernes	Norway
17	Tomislav Čižmešija	Yugoslavia
18	Niclas Karlsson	Sweden
19	Nikolai Tonev	Bulgaria
20	Maarten van Mechelen	Luxembourg
Did not advance to free skating
21	Emanuele Ancorini	Sweden
22	Alexandre Geers	Belgium
WD	Ralph Burghart	Austria

=== Ladies ===
Rank	Name	Nation
1	Surya Bonaly	France
2	Evelyn Großmann	Germany
3	Marina Kielmann	Germany
4	Joanne Conway	United Kingdom
5	Patricia Neske	Germany
6	Lenka Kulovaná	Czechoslovakia
7	Yulia Vorobieva	Soviet Union
8	Natalia Gorbenko	Soviet Union
9	Simone Lang	Germany
10	Laetitia Hubert	France
11	Larisa Zamotina	Soviet Union
12	Sabine Contini	Italy
13	Anisette Torp-Lind	Denmark
14	Hélène Persson	Sweden
15	Nathalie Krieg	Switzerland
16	Zuzanna Szwed	Poland
17	Marion Krijgsman	Netherlands
18	Željka Čižmešija	Yugoslavia
19	Anita Markoczy	Hungary
Did not advance to free skating
20	Codruta Moiseanu	Romania
21	Milena Marinovich	Bulgaria
22	Kaisa Kella	Finland
23	Anita Thorenfeldt	Norway
24	Marta Andrade	Spain
25	Sandrine Goes	Belgium
WD	Tamara Téglássy	Hungary

=== Pairs ===
Rank	Name	Nation
1	Natalia Mishkutenok / Artur Dmitriev	Soviet Union
2	Elena Bechke / Denis Petrov	Soviet Union
3	Evgenia Shishkova / Vadim Naumov	Soviet Union
4	Radka Kovaříková / René Novotný	Czechoslovakia
5	Mandy Wötzel / Axel Rauschenbach	Germany
6	Anuschka Gläser / Stefan Pfengle	Germany
7	Ines Müller / Ingo Steuer	Germany
8	Cheryl Peake / Andrew Naylor	United Kingdom
9	Katarzyna Głowacka / Krzysztof Korcarz	Poland
10	Saskia Bourgeois / Guy Bourgeois	Switzerland
11	Catherine Barker / Michael Aldred	United Kingdom
12	Anna Tabacchi / Massimo Salvade	Italy

=== Ice dancing ===
Rank	Name	Nation
1	Marina Klimova / Sergei Ponomarenko	Soviet Union
2	Isabelle Duchesnay / Paul Duchesnay	France
3	Maya Usova / Alexander Zhulin	Soviet Union
4	Klára Engi / Attila Tóth	Hungary
5	Oksana Grishuk / Evgeni Platov	Soviet Union
6	Stefania Calegari / Pasquale Camerlengo	Italy
7	Dominique Yvon / Frédéric Palluel	France
8	Susanna Rahkamo / Petri Kokko	Finland
9	Sophie Moniotte / Pascal Lavanchy	France
10	Kateřina Mrázová / Martin Šimeček	Czechoslovakia
11	Jennifer Goolsbee / Hendryk Schamberger	Germany
12	Monika Mandikova / Oliver Pekar	Czechoslovakia
13	Saskia Stahler / Sven Authorsen	Germany
14	Regina Woodward / Csaba Szentpéteri	Hungary
15	Diane Gerencser / Bernard Columberg	Switzerland
16	Ann Hall / Jason Blomfield	United Kingdom
17	Kati Uski / Juha Sasi	Finland
18	Joanne van Leeuwen / Eerde van Leeuwen	Netherlands
WD	Maria Hadjiiska / Hristo Nikolov	Bulgaria
