= Valery Kornienko =

Soviet pair skater

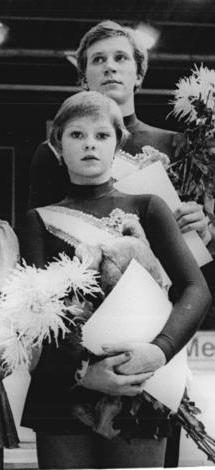

Personal information
- Full name: Valery Leonidovich Kornienko
- Other names: Valeri Kornienko; Valeriy Kornienko
- Born: 13 March 1961 (age 65) Piterka
- Home town: Kharkiv
- Height: 183 cm (6 ft 0 in)

Figure skating career
- Country: Soviet Union
- Skating club: FSA Amsterdam
- Retired: 1987
Medal record
Representing Soviet Union
European Championships
Bronze medal – third place	1986 Copenhagen	Pairs

Valery Leonidovich Kornienko (Russian: Валерий Леонидович Корниенко; born 13 March 1961 in Piterka) is a former Soviet pair skater. With partner Elena Bechke, he is the 1986 European bronze medalist and 1984 Skate Canada champion. They split in 1987.

== Results ==
with Bechke

International
Event	80–81	81–82	82–83	83–84	84–85	85–86	86–87
European Champ.						3rd	
Skate America						2nd	
Skate Canada					1st		
Int. St. Gervais					1st		
Moscow News				3rd	3rd	3rd	2nd
Nebelhorn Trophy					1st		
Prague Skate			2nd				2nd
Universiade							2nd
National
Soviet Champ.		6th		3rd	4th	5th	
Spartakiada						2nd	
USSR Cup	5th		2nd	1st	2nd		
