= 139th Rifle Division =

Infantry division of the Red Army

The 139th Rifle Division was an infantry division of the Red Army, formed three times during World War II, in 1939 and twice in 1941.

== First Formation ==
Its First Formation was established at Kozelsk in September 1939, on the basis of a regiment of the 81st Rifle Division. It fought in the Winter War with Finland. It initially consisted of the 718th, 609th, and 364th Rifle Regiments. Fighting as part of 8th Army, it was defeated at the Battle of Tolvajärvi on 12 December 1939. It was serving with 37th Rifle Corps, 6th Army, Kiev Special Military District, on 22 June 1941. It was wiped out during the Battle of Uman in August 1941.

Force Composition 2 October 1939

- 364th Rifle Regiment
- 609th Rifle Regiment
- 718th Rifle Regiment
- 354th Light Artillery Regiment

== Second Formation ==
It was recreated (II formation) from 9th Moscow People's Militia Rifle Division (In 1941, residents of Zamoskvorechye formed the Twelfth Militia Division of Kirovsky District (дивизия народного ополчения Кировского района) (Zamoskvorechye District). It was destroyed again at Vyazma in October 1941.

== Third Formation ==
It was recreated (III formation) at Cheboksary in January 1942. Fought at Kursk and Gdynia. It received a large number of volunteers from Siberia before participating in the Battle of Kursk. A popular song was written about a platoon of the division "Na Bazimyannoy Visote" (Russian: "На безымянной высоте") (On a nameless height) featured in the film "Tishina" (Silence) that documented the events of a defence of a height at the village of Rubezhenka, Kuybyshevsky rayon, Kaluga Oblast, when the platoon defended against an attack by a German battalion estimated at a strength of 200 on 14 September 1943. There were only two survivors from the platoon, but the height was held. It was serving with the 49th Army of the 2nd Belorussian Front in May 1945.

The division appears to have disbanded "in place" with the Group of Soviet Forces in Germany during the summer of 1945.

== Notable commanders ==
- Pavel Ponedelin (15 December 1939 – 1940)

== See also ==
- On the Nameless Height

== Notes ==
- Feskov, V.I.; Golikov, V.I.; Kalashnikov, K.A.; Slugin, S.A. (2013). Вооруженные силы СССР после Второй Мировой войны: от Красной Армии к Советской [The Armed Forces of the USSR after World War II: From the Red Army to the Soviet: Part 1 Land Forces] (in Russian). Tomsk: Scientific and Technical Literature Publishing. ISBN 9785895035306.
