= Oleg Vasiliev (figure skater) =

Russian pair skater and coach (born 1959)

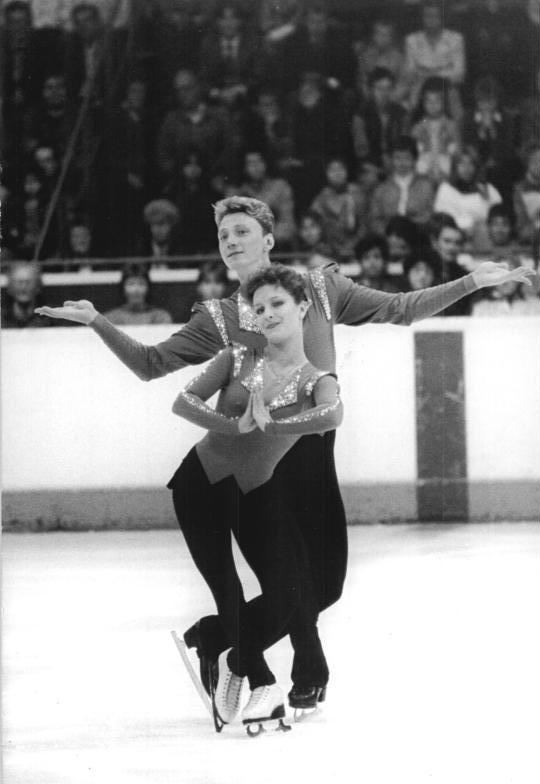
- Valova and Vasiliev in 1987

Personal information
- Full name: Oleg Kimovich Vasiliev
- Born: 22 November 1959 (age 66) Leningrad, Russian SFSR, Soviet Union
- Height: 1.70 m (5 ft 7 in) – 1.80 m (5 ft 11 in)

Figure skating career
- Country: Soviet Union; Russia
- Retired: 1988
Medal record
Representing Soviet Union
Figure skating: Pairs
Olympic Games
Gold medal – first place	1984 Sarajevo	Pairs
Silver medal – second place	1988 Calgary	Pairs
World Championships
Gold medal – first place	1983 Helsinki	Pairs
Gold medal – first place	1985 Tokyo	Pairs
Gold medal – first place	1988 Budapest	Pairs
Silver medal – second place	1984 Ottawa	Pairs
Silver medal – second place	1986 Geneva	Pairs
Silver medal – second place	1987 Cincinnati	Pairs
European Championships
Gold medal – first place	1984 Budapest	Pairs
Gold medal – first place	1985 Gothenburg	Pairs
Gold medal – first place	1986 Copenhagen	Pairs
Silver medal – second place	1983 Dortmund	Pairs
Silver medal – second place	1987 Sarajevo	Pairs

Oleg Kimovich Vasiliev (Russian: Олег Кимович Васильев; born 22 November 1959) is a Russian former pair skater who competed internationally for the Soviet Union. With his then-wife Elena Valova, he is the 1984 Olympic champion, 1988 Olympic silver medalist, and three-time World Champion (1983, 1985, 1988). Their coach throughout their career was Tamara Moskvina. After retiring from competition, Vasiliev became a coach, leading the pair of Tatiana Totmianina / Maxim Marinin to the 2006 Olympic title.

== Personal life ==
Vasiliev was born in Leningrad (modern-day Saint Petersburg), Russian SFSR, to parents Ludmila Konstantinovna Vasilieva, a nurse, and Kim Mikhailovich Vasiliev. He graduated from the Institute for Physical Culture in Saint Petersburg.

Vasiliev moved to Chicago, Illinois in December 1997. He was married to Valova from 1984 to 1992. He later married a Saint Petersburg resident named Valentina (divorced in 2000), with whom he has a daughter, Katia. His first daughter was born circa 1994.

Around 2013, Vasiliev married his third wife, Natalia, who is from Moscow. As of August 2016, the couple lives in Moscow with their daughter Varvara (born circa 2014).

== Career ==
=== Competitive career ===
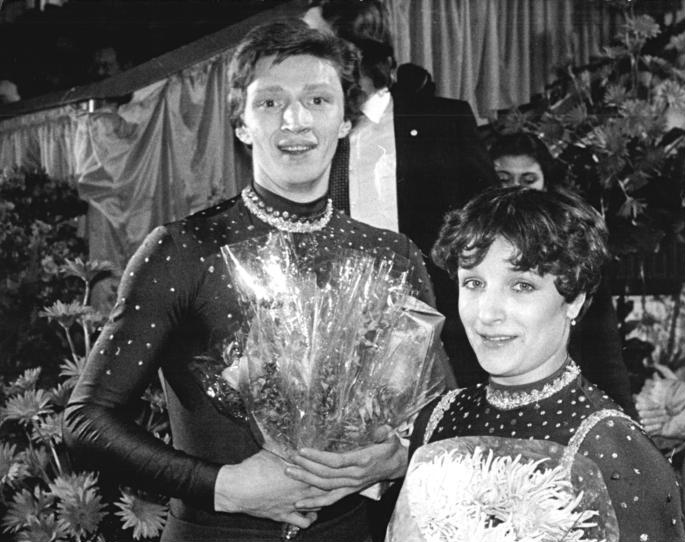
Vasiliev and Elena Valova in Karl-Marx-Stadt, 1983

Vasiliev's parents decided to introduce him to skating when he was five because he had had pneumonia several times as a child and his doctor recommended an outdoor activity. As a single skater, Vasiliev won a Junior national title.

Coach Tamara Moskvina invited Vasiliev to switch to pair skating several times before he agreed, at age 18. Initially, he was physically ill-suited for the discipline and had much work to develop his muscles. He and his first partner, Larisa Selezneva, argued incessantly and split after three months. Moskvina then paired him with Elena Valova, with whom he continued to train in Leningrad (Saint Petersburg).

Valova/Vasiliev's breakthrough came in the 1982–83 season. They won bronze at the Prize of Moscow News, gold at the 1982 Skate America, and then silver at the 1983 European Championships. The pair concluded their season by winning their first World title. They missed the 1983 national championships due to Vasiliev's broken jaw.

In 1984, Valova/Vasiliev won their first European title and then took gold at the 1984 Winter Olympics in Sarajevo. The deaths of several Soviet government officials, including one during the Olympics, cast a pall over the Soviet team and the athletes were told not to show too much joy. The pair took silver at their final event of the season, the 1984 World Championships.

In 1985, the pair won gold at both the European and World Championships but 1986 saw the emergence of the young Moscow pair Ekaterina Gordeeva / Sergei Grinkov. Although Valova/Vasiliev were awarded gold at the 1986 Europeans, they finished second to the Muscovites at both the 1986 and 1987 Worlds.

In their final amateur season, Valova/Vasiliev took silver at the 1988 Winter Olympics behind Gordeeva/Grinkov but then prevailed over the reigning Olympic champions at the 1988 World Championships. After winning their third World title, Valova/Vasiliev retired from ISU competition. After performing for a year in Igor Bobrin's ice theatre, they signed a U.S. contract – the first Soviets to do so without losing their citizenship. The pair performed together in various shows and events until the end of 1997.

Vasiliev was awarded the Order of Friendship of Peoples.

=== Coaching career ===
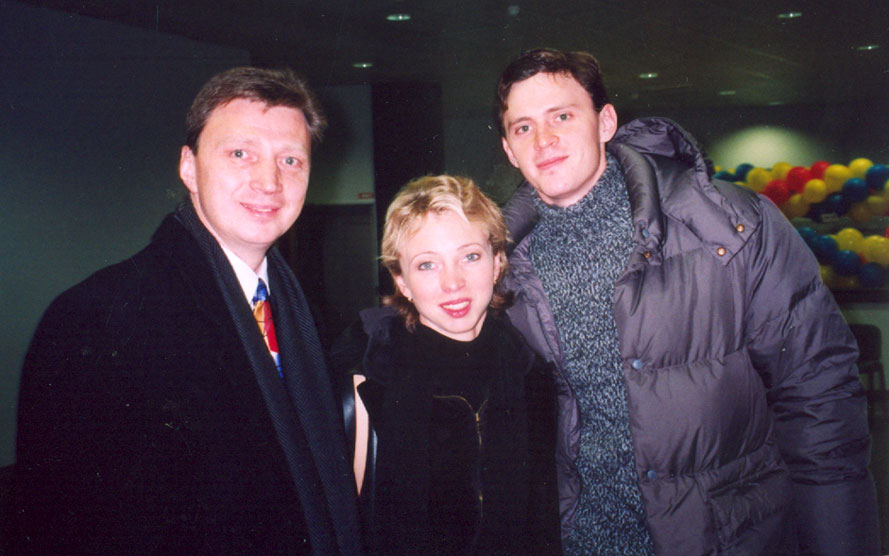
Vasiliev (far left) in 2004 with Tatiana Totmianina and Maxim Marinin

Vasiliev initially had no interest in coaching, but changed his mind. He coached one season for the Latvian federation and then about two years for the French federation near Paris. Since 1998, Vasiliev has coached in Chicago and Saint Petersburg. During his time in the United States, he worked at the Oakton Ice Arena in Park Ridge, Illinois. He has coached the following skaters:

- Vera Bazarova / Andrei Deputat: From April 2014 to 2016
- Tatiana Totmianina / Maxim Marinin: From January 2001 to March 2006 (2006 Olympic champions and two-time World champions)
- Maria Mukhortova / Maxim Trankov: From December 2006 to March 2010 (2008 European silver medalists)
- Viktoria Volchkova: From spring 2002 to mid-2003 (2002 Grand Prix Final bronze medalist)
- Fumie Suguri: From autumn 2004 to 2005
- Katarina Gerboldt / Alexander Enbert: From May 2013 to April 2014
- Ivan Righini
- Nicole Della Monica / Matteo Guarise
- Viktoriia Safonova

=== Television ===
Vasiliev appeared in the sixth season of the ice show contest Ice Age.

== Programs ==
(with Valova)

=== 1979–1988 ===
Season	Short program	Free skating	Exhibition
1987–88	Zorba's Dance (from Zorba the Greek) by Mikis Theodorakis	The Final Countdown by Europe; Romance (from The Blizzard) by Georgy Sviridov; The Final Countdown	Stampede soundtrack; Romance (from The Blizzard) by Georgy Sviridov
1986–87	Georgian folk: Lezginka; Suliko	Pizzicato Polka; Acceleration Waltz by Johann Strauss II; Radetzky March by Johann Strauss I	Anthem of Leningrad Russian: Гимн Ленинграду; Kalinka; Romance (from The Blizzard) by Georgy Sviridov
1985–86	Music by Raimonds Pauls	Şüräle by Färit Yarullin	Romance (from The Blizzard) by Georgy Sviridov
1984–85	Flight of the Bumblebee by Nikolai Rimsky-Korsakov	Şüräle by Färit Yarullin	Baba-Yaga (from Pictures at an Exhibition) by Modest Mussorgsky; Madama Butterfly by Giacomo Puccini
1983–84	Kalinka	Get Back; Für Elise by Ludwig van Beethoven; Stairway to Heaven	Baba-Yaga (from Pictures at an Exhibition) by Modest Mussorgsky; Solveig's Song by Edvard Grieg
1982–83	March of the Toreadors (from Carmen) by Georges Bizet; Sibaney	Get Back; Für Elise by Ludwig van Beethoven; Stairway to Heaven	Solveig's Song by Edvard Grieg; Circus
1981–82		Scheherazade by Nikolai Rimsky-Korsakov	
1980–81		Scheherazade by Nikolai Rimsky-Korsakov; Pictures at an Exhibition by Modest Mussorgsky	
1979–80	Demon	Little Eagle Russian: Орлёнок; On the Nameless Height Russian: На безымянной высоте; We are blacksmiths Russian: Мы кузнецы и дух наш молод	

=== 1989–1997 ===
Programs
- None but the lonely heart
  by Pyotr Ilyich Tchaikovsky

- All Shook Up
  by Elvis Presley

- Star and Death of Joaquin Murrieta
  Russian: Звезда и смерть Хоакина Мурьеты
  by Alexey Rybnikov

- The Story of My Life
  by Michael Crawford

- Bridge over Troubled Water

- Paso Doble
  (from Strictly Ballroom)

- A Whiter Shade of Pale

- Kalinka

- Waltz
  by Jerry Herman

- Swan Lake (comedic)
  by Pyotr Ilyich Tchaikovsky

- Zorba's Dance
  (from Zorba the Greek)
  by Mikis Theodorakis

- Şüräle
  by Färit Yarullin

== Results ==
=== Amateur career with Valova ===
International
Event	79–80	80–81	81–82	82–83	83–84	84–85	85–86	86–87	87–88
Winter Olympics					1st				2nd
World Champ.				1st	2nd	1st	2nd	2nd	1st
European Champ.				2nd	1st	1st	1st	2nd	
Skate America			3rd	1st					
NHK Trophy								1st	
Nebelhorn Trophy			1st						
Moscow News	6th	3rd		3rd	1st				2nd
St. Gervais			2nd						
National
Soviet Champ.			3rd			2nd	1st		

=== Professional career with Valova ===
Event	89–90	90–91	91–92	92–93	93–94	94–95	97–98
World Professional Champ.	2nd	4th	4th	4th	3rd		
World Challenge of Champions	2nd	5th	4th	2nd	3rd		
US Open				5th	2nd		5th
Masters Miko					3rd		
Canadian Professional Champ.						4th	
Legends							2nd
