= Piterka =

Piterka (Russian: Питерка) is the name of several rural localities in Russia:

- Piterka (railway station), Saratov Oblast, a railway station in Pitersky District, Saratov Oblast
- Piterka (selo), Saratov Oblast, a selo in Pitersky District, Saratov Oblast
- Piterka, Tambov Oblast, a selo in Piterkovsky Selsoviet of Morshansky District of Tambov Oblast
