= Mathew Gates =

British-American ice dancer (born 1975)

Personal information
- Born: June 29, 1975 (age 51) Hitchin, England
- Height: 5 ft 6 in (1.68 m)

Figure skating career
- Country: United States
- Skating club: Dallas FSC
- Began skating: 1988
- Retired: 2003

Mathew Gates (born June 29, 1975) is a British-American former competitive ice dancer. With Eve Chalom, he is the 1996 Nebelhorn Trophy silver medalist and a two-time (1997, 1999) U.S. national silver medalist. He has medaled seven consecutive times at the US National Championships from Novice to Senior level. Gates is a two-time World competitor and member of Team USA. Gates is a World/International level Coach and Choreographer.

== Personal life ==
Gates was born June 29, 1975, in Hitchin, England. He moved to the United States in 1992. He is married to Kelly Gates, who is a former professional figure skater, figure skating coach, and a Registered Nurse. They have two children, and reside in Delaware, USA.

== Career ==
Gates started skating as a singles skater in England before focusing on ice dancing. As a young child, he trained as a gymnast. Gates was coached by Elizabeth Coates in England before he relocated to the U.S. to train at the Detroit Skating Club.

=== Partnership with Chalom ===
Gates teamed up with American skater Eve Chalom in 1992, following a tryout in Boston arranged by Coates. They decided to represent the United States. The duo trained at Detroit Skating Club with Igor Shpilband. After winning national titles on the novice level in 1993 and on the junior level in 1995, the duo took bronze at the 1996 U.S. Championships in their first season as seniors.

In the 1996–97 season, Chalom/Gates were awarded silver at the 1996 Nebelhorn Trophy and debuted on the Champions Series (later known as the Grand Prix series). They also won silver at the 1997 U.S. Championships and were assigned to the 1997 World Championships in Lausanne, where they placed 17th.

Chalom/Gates were ineligible for the 1998 Winter Olympics because he was not yet an American citizen. They finished fourth at the 1998 U.S. Championships. They were coached by Coates and Igor Shpilband until the end of the 1997–98 season and then switched to Christopher Dean and Warren Maxwell in Plano, Texas. In their final season together, Chalom/Gates won their second national silver medal and finished 17th at the 1999 World Championships in Helsinki, Finland.

Chalom/Gates skated professionally in numerous ice shows, and were invited to perform for the Champions on Ice Tour.

=== Later career ===
In January 2002, Gates tried out with Emilie Nussear on the advice of a coach, Tatiana Tarasova. Nussear/Gates won the silver medal at the 2002 Karl Schäfer Memorial and placed 5th at the 2003 U.S. Championships. They were coached by Tarasova, Nikolai Morozov, and Maia Usova in Newington, Connecticut.

Gates began working as a coach and choreographer by 2000. In 2001, Gates won the PSA Choreographer award for “William Tell Overture” program for best men's performance - Michael Weiss. Since then, Gates has coached and choreographed for skaters from beginner through National, World & Olympic level. Former students/choreograph students include: Kaitlyn Weaver and Andrew Poje, Zachary Donohue, Nikolaj Sorensen, Cathy Reed, Chris Reed, Anna Zadorozhniuk, Sergei Verbillo, Maxim Bolotin Olga Orlova, Tanja Kolbe, Stefano Caruso, Avonley Nguyen, Michael Weiss, Katarina Delcamp, Maxwell Gart, Kristin Fraser, Igor Lukanin, Collin Brubaker, Charlene Guignard, Marco Fabbri Alexandra Zaretsky, Roman Zaretsky, Mark Hanretty Molly Cesanak, Annabelle Morozov Nikolas WamsteekerMaxim Naumov, Haley Sales Alina Milevska, Melissa Gregory, Denis Petukhov, Emily Zhang, Ting Cui, Isabella Tobias, Ashley Foy, Benjamin Blum, Irina Movchan Corenne Bruhns, among others.

Former coaching partners include Nikolai Morozov (Hackensack, NJ) Shae-Lynn Bourne, Svetlana Kulikova, Dmitry Palamarchuk (Connecticut) and Natalia Mishkutinok (Dallas, TX)

Gates is an ISU Technical Specialist. Gates currently coaches in Delaware at Patriot Ice Center and University of Delaware (Greater Philadelphia / Baltimore area) as part of Kirsanov Legacy, in memory of the late Sasha Kirsanov who passed in flight 5342. Gates collaborates with many coaches including: Natalia Gudina, Suzy Seminack Schurman, Irina Romanova & Andriy Kyforenko. Gates travels to choreograph for international skaters throughout North America and Europe. He is a representative on the Coach’s Council at US Figure Skating.

== Programs ==
=== With Chalom ===
Season	Original dance	Free dance
1998–99		Symphony No. 25; Lacrimosa (from Requiem) by Wolfgang Amadeus Mozart

=== With Nussear ===
Season	Original dance	Free dance
2002–03	Waltz; Polka; Waltz	The Four Seasons by Antonio Vivaldi

== Results ==
GP: Champions Series / Grand Prix

=== With Chalom ===
International
Event	93–94	94–95	95–96	96–97	97–98	98–99
Worlds				17th		17th
GP Cup of Russia				8th	5th	
GP Nations Cup				9th	9th	
GP NHK Trophy						7th
GP Skate America						7th
GP Skate Canada				7th		
Nebelhorn Trophy			12th	2nd		
St. Gervais		10th	8th			
Basler Cup			3rd			
International: Junior
Junior Worlds	14th					
National
U.S. Champ.	3rd J	1st J	3rd	2nd	4th	2nd
Levels – N: Novice; J: Junior

=== With Nussear ===
International
Event	2002–03
GP Skate America	7th
Karl Schäfer Memorial	2nd
National
U.S. Championships	5th
