= Elena Valova =

Russian pair skater (born 1963)

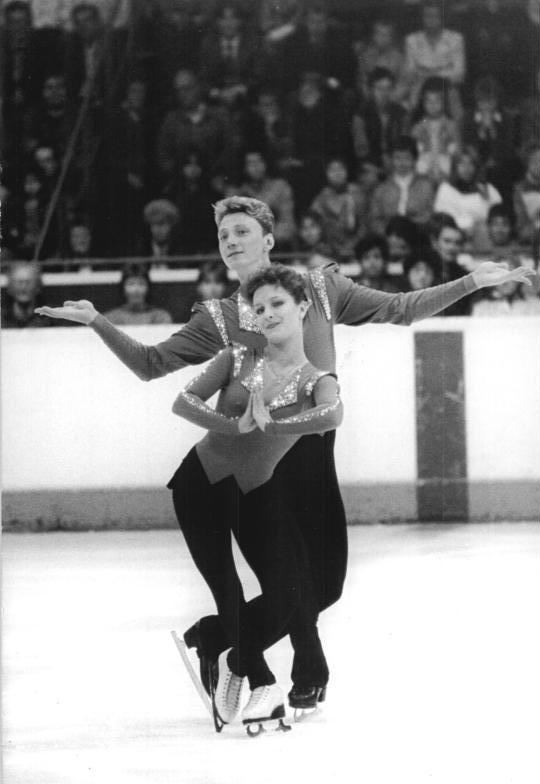
- Valova and Vasiliev in 1987

Personal information
- Full name: Elena Aleksandrovna Valova
- Born: 4 January 1963 (age 63) Leningrad, Russian SFSR, Soviet Union
- Height: 1.55 m (5 ft 1 in)

Figure skating career
- Country: Soviet Union; Russia
- Retired: 1988
Medal record
Representing Soviet Union
Pairs' Figure skating
Olympic Games
Gold medal – first place	1984 Sarajevo	Pairs
Silver medal – second place	1988 Calgary	Pairs
World Championships
Gold medal – first place	1983 Helsinki	Pairs
Gold medal – first place	1985 Tokyo	Pairs
Gold medal – first place	1988 Budapest	Pairs
Silver medal – second place	1984 Ottawa	Pairs
Silver medal – second place	1986 Geneva	Pairs
Silver medal – second place	1987 Cincinnati	Pairs
European Championships
Gold medal – first place	1984 Budapest	Pairs
Gold medal – first place	1985 Gothenburg	Pairs
Gold medal – first place	1986 Copenhagen	Pairs
Silver medal – second place	1983 Dortmund	Pairs
Silver medal – second place	1987 Sarajevo	Pairs

Elena Aleksandrovna Valova (Russian: Елена Александровна Валова; born 4 January 1963) is a Russian former pair skater who competed internationally for the Soviet Union. With her then-husband Oleg Vasiliev, she is the 1984 Olympic champion, 1988 Olympic silver medalist, and three-time World Champion (1983, 1985, 1988). Their coach throughout their career was Tamara Moskvina.

== Personal life ==
Valova was born in Leningrad, Russian SFSR, to parents Alla Borisovna Valova and Aleksander Dmitrievich Valov. She graduated from the P.F. Lesgaft University of Sports. She and Vasiliev were married from 1984 to 1992. Valova is now remarried to German Galusha and has a son, Roman, born in 1996. She moved to Pittsburgh, Pennsylvania in 1997 and currently lives in Moon Township.

== Career ==
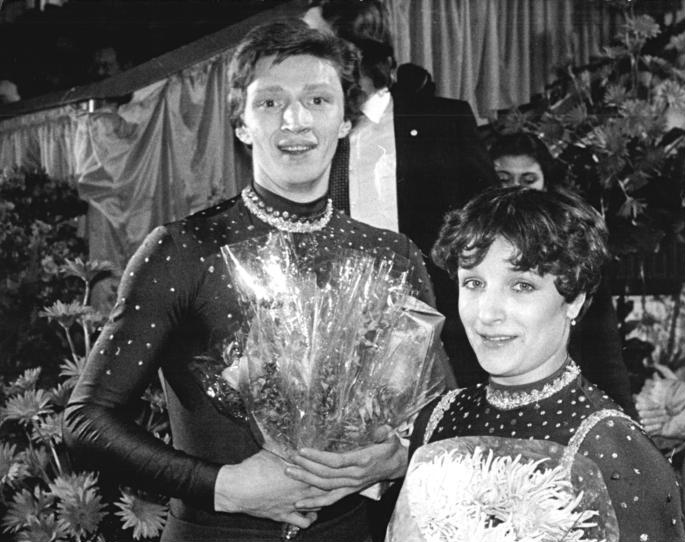
Oleg Vasiliev and Valova in Karl-Marx-Stadt, 1983

Valova began training at age seven under Tatiana Mishina, Alexei Mishin, and Nina Monahova. As a pair skater, she was coached by Tamara Moskvina, who partnered her with Oleg Vasiliev. The pair trained in Leningrad (Saint Petersburg).

Valova/Vasiliev's breakthrough came in the 1982–83 season. They won bronze at the Prize of Moscow News, gold at the 1982 Skate America, and then silver at the 1983 European Championships. The pair concluded their season by winning their first World title. They missed the 1983 national championships due to Vasiliev's broken jaw.

In 1984, Valova/Vasiliev won their first European title and then took gold at the 1984 Winter Olympics in Sarajevo. The deaths of several Soviet government officials, including one during the Olympics, cast a pall over the Soviet team and the athletes were told not to show too much joy. The pair took silver at their final event of the season, the 1984 World Championships.

In 1985, the pair won gold at both the European and World Championships but 1986 saw the emergence of the young Moscow pair Ekaterina Gordeeva / Sergei Grinkov. Although Valova/Vasiliev were awarded gold at the 1986 Europeans, they finished second to the Muscovites at both the 1986 and 1987 Worlds.

In their final amateur season, Valova/Vasiliev took silver at the 1988 Winter Olympics behind Gordeeva/Grinkov but then prevailed over the reigning Olympic champions at the 1988 World Championships. After winning their third World title, Valova/Vasiliev retired from ISU competition. After performing for a year in Igor Bobrin's ice theatre, they signed a U.S. contract – the first Soviets to do so without losing their citizenship. The pair performed together in various shows and events until the end of 1997.

Valova was awarded the Order of Friendship of Peoples (1984). She represented VSS Trud.

She currently teaches skating at the Robert Morris University Island Sports Center. She coached Kylie Gleason / Taylor Toth, who were the 2002 U.S. champions in juvenile pairs and the 2003 U.S. champions in intermediate pairs.

== Programs ==
(with Vasiliev)

=== 1979–1988 ===
Season	Short program	Free skating	Exhibition
1987–1988	Zorba's Dance (from Zorba the Greek) by Mikis Theodorakis	The Final Countdown by Europe; Romance (from The Blizzard) by Georgy Sviridov; The Final Countdown	Stampede soundtrack; Romance (from The Blizzard) by Georgy Sviridov
1986–1987	Georgian folk: Lezginka; Suliko	Pizzicato Polka; Acceleration Waltz by Johann Strauss II; Radetzky March by Johann Strauss I	Anthem of Leningrad Russian: Гимн Ленинграду; Kalinka; Romance (from The Blizzard) by Georgy Sviridov
1985–1986	Music by Raimonds Pauls	Şüräle by Färit Yarullin	Romance (from The Blizzard) by Georgy Sviridov
1984–1985	Flight of the Bumblebee by Nikolai Rimsky-Korsakov	Şüräle by Färit Yarullin	Baba-Yaga (from Pictures at an Exhibition) by Modest Mussorgsky; Madama Butterfly by Giacomo Puccini
1983–1984	Kalinka	Get Back; Für Elise by Ludwig van Beethoven; Stairway to Heaven	Baba-Yaga (from Pictures at an Exhibition) by Modest Mussorgsky; Solveig's Song by Edvard Grieg
1982–1983	March of the Toreadors (from Carmen) by Georges Bizet; Sibaney	Get Back; Für Elise by Ludwig van Beethoven; Stairway to Heaven	Solveig's Song by Edvard Grieg; Circus
1981–1982		Scheherazade by Nikolai Rimsky-Korsakov	
1980–1981		Scheherazade by Nikolai Rimsky-Korsakov; Pictures at an Exhibition by Modest Mussorgsky	
1979–1980	Demon	Little Eagle Russian: Орлёнок; On the Nameless Height Russian: На безымянной высоте; We are blacksmiths Russian: Мы кузнецы и дух наш молод	

=== 1989–1997 ===
Programs
- None but the lonely heart
  by Pyotr Ilyich Tchaikovsky

- All Shook Up
  by Elvis Presley

- Star and Death of Joaquin Murrieta
  Russian: Звезда и смерть Хоакина Мурьеты
  by Alexey Rybnikov

- The Story of My Life
  by Michael Crawford

- Bridge over Troubled Water

- Paso Doble
  (from Strictly Ballroom)

- A Whiter Shade of Pale

- Kalinka

- Waltz
  by Jerry Herman

- Swan Lake (comedic)
  by Pyotr Ilyich Tchaikovsky

- Zorba's Dance
  (from Zorba the Greek)
  by Mikis Theodorakis

- Şüräle
  by Färit Yarullin

== Results ==
=== Amateur career with Vasiliev ===
International
Event	79–80	80–81	81–82	82–83	83–84	84–85	85–86	86–87	87–88
Winter Olympics					1st				2nd
World Champ.				1st	2nd	1st	2nd	2nd	1st
European Champ.				2nd	1st	1st	1st	2nd	
Skate America			3rd	1st					
NHK Trophy								1st	
Nebelhorn Trophy			1st						
Moscow News	6th	3rd		3rd	1st				2nd
St. Gervais			2nd						
National
Soviet Champ.			3rd			2nd	1st		

=== Professional career with Vasiliev ===
Event	89–90	90–91	91–92	92–93	93–94	94–95	97–98
World Professional Champ.	2nd	4th	4th	4th	3rd		
World Challenge of Champions	2nd	5th	4th	2nd	3rd		
US Open				5th	2nd		5th
Masters Miko					3rd		
Canadian Professional Champ.						4th	
Legends							2nd
