= Eve Chalom =

American ice dancer (born 1979)

Personal information
- Born: October 22, 1979 (age 47) Detroit, Michigan, U.S.
- Height: 5 ft 2 in (1.57 m)

Figure skating career
- Country: United States
- Skating club: Lone Star FSC
- Began skating: 1987
- Retired: 1999

Eve Chalom (born October 22, 1979) is an American former competitive ice dancer. With Mathew Gates, she is the 1996 Nebelhorn Trophy silver medalist and a two-time (1997, 1999) U.S. national silver medalist.

== Personal life ==
Chalom was born October 22, 1979, in Detroit, Michigan. She is profoundly hearing impaired, having lost a significant portion of her hearing in both ears in a car accident when she was four years old. After studying elementary education and American sign language at Madonna University in Livonia, Michigan, she went on to receive bachelor's degrees from the University of Michigan in English and Philosophy. She received a master’s degree in Dance Movement Therapy, and was certified as a brain injury specialist and yoga teacher. She also has been a skating coach and performed with the Ice Theater of New York and Ice Semble Chicago. She has a private dance movement therapy practice.

== Career ==
Chalom teamed up with British skater Mathew Gates in 1992, following a tryout in Boston arranged by Elizabeth Coates. They decided to represent the United States. After winning national titles on the novice level in 1993 and on the junior level in 1995, the duo took bronze at the 1996 U.S. Championships in their first season as seniors.

In the 1996–97 season, Chalom/Gates were awarded silver at the 1996 Nebelhorn Trophy and debuted on the Champions Series (later known as the Grand Prix series). They also won silver at the 1997 U.S. Championships and were assigned to the 1997 World Championships in Lausanne, where they placed 17th.

Chalom/Gates were ineligible for the 1998 Winter Olympics because he was not yet an American citizen. They finished fourth at the 1998 U.S. Championships. They were coached by Coates and Igor Shpilband until the end of the 1997–98 season and then switched to Warren Maxwell and Christopher Dean in Plano, Texas. In their final season together, Chalom/Gates won their second national silver medal and finished 17th at the 1999 World Championships in Helsinki, Finland.

Chalom teaches figure skating and is a dance movement therapist in Chicago.

== Programs ==
(with Gates)

Season	Original dance	Free dance
1998–99		Symphony No. 25; Lacrimosa (from Requiem) by Wolfgang Amadeus Mozart

== Results ==
GP: Champions Series / Grand Prix

(with Gates)

International
Event	92–93	93–94	94–95	95–96	96–97	97–98	98–99
Worlds					17th		17th
GP Cup of Russia					8th	5th	
GP Nations Cup					9th	9th	
GP NHK Trophy							7th
GP Skate America							7th
GP Skate Canada					7th		
Nebelhorn Trophy				12th	2nd		
St. Gervais			10th	8th			
Basler Cup				3rd			
International: Junior
Junior Worlds		14th					
National
U.S. Champ.	1st N	3rd J	1st J	3rd	2nd	4th	2nd
Levels – N: Novice; J: Junior
