= Ryan Van Natten =

American-born ice dancer (born 1987)

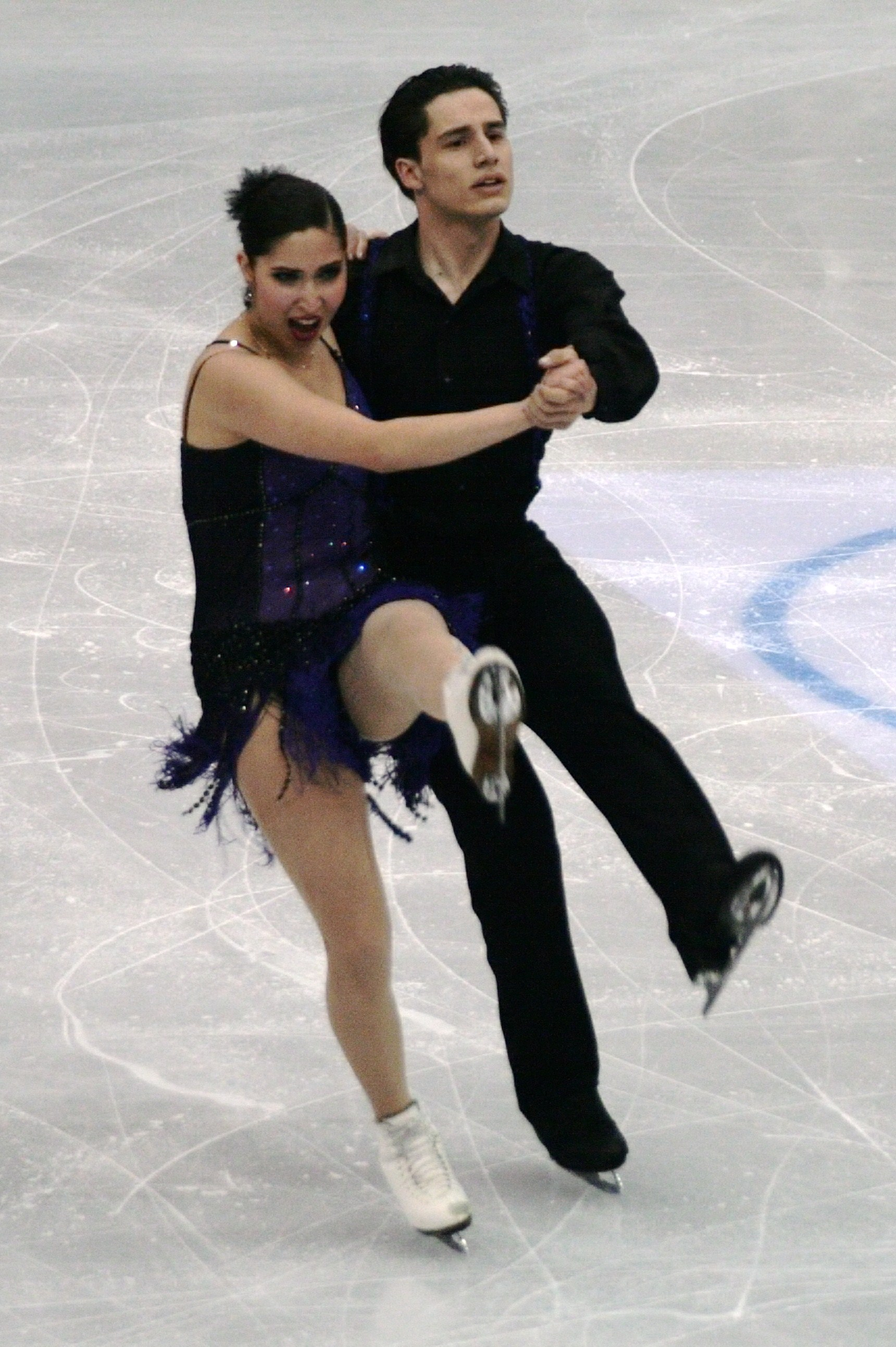
- Bruhns and Van Natten in 2012

Personal information
- Full name: Ryan Sequoia Van Natten
- Born: November 11, 1987 (age 38) Voorhees, NJ, United States
- Home town: Anchorage, Alaska
- Height: 1.80 m (5 ft 11 in)

Figure skating career
- Country: Mexico
- Partner: Corenne Bruhns
- Coach: Evgeni Platov
- Skating club: Estado de Mexico
- Began skating: 2002

Ryan Van Natten (born November 11, 1987) is an American-born ice dancer who currently competes for Mexico with partner Corenne Bruhns. Together, they are the 2012 Mexican national champions.

Van Natten is a member of the federally-recognized Lumbee Tribe of North Carolina by his mother Becky (Lowery) Van Natten. His mother is a registered nurse while his father, Peter Van Natten, is a Chief Petty Officer (United States) in the US Coast Guard.

== Programs ==
(with Bruhns)

Season	Short dance	Free dance
2011–2012	Mariposa Traicionera by Paul McCoy; Pégate by Ricky Martin	Harlem Nocturne by Earle Hagen; My Drag performed by Squirrel Nut Zippers

== Competitive highlights ==
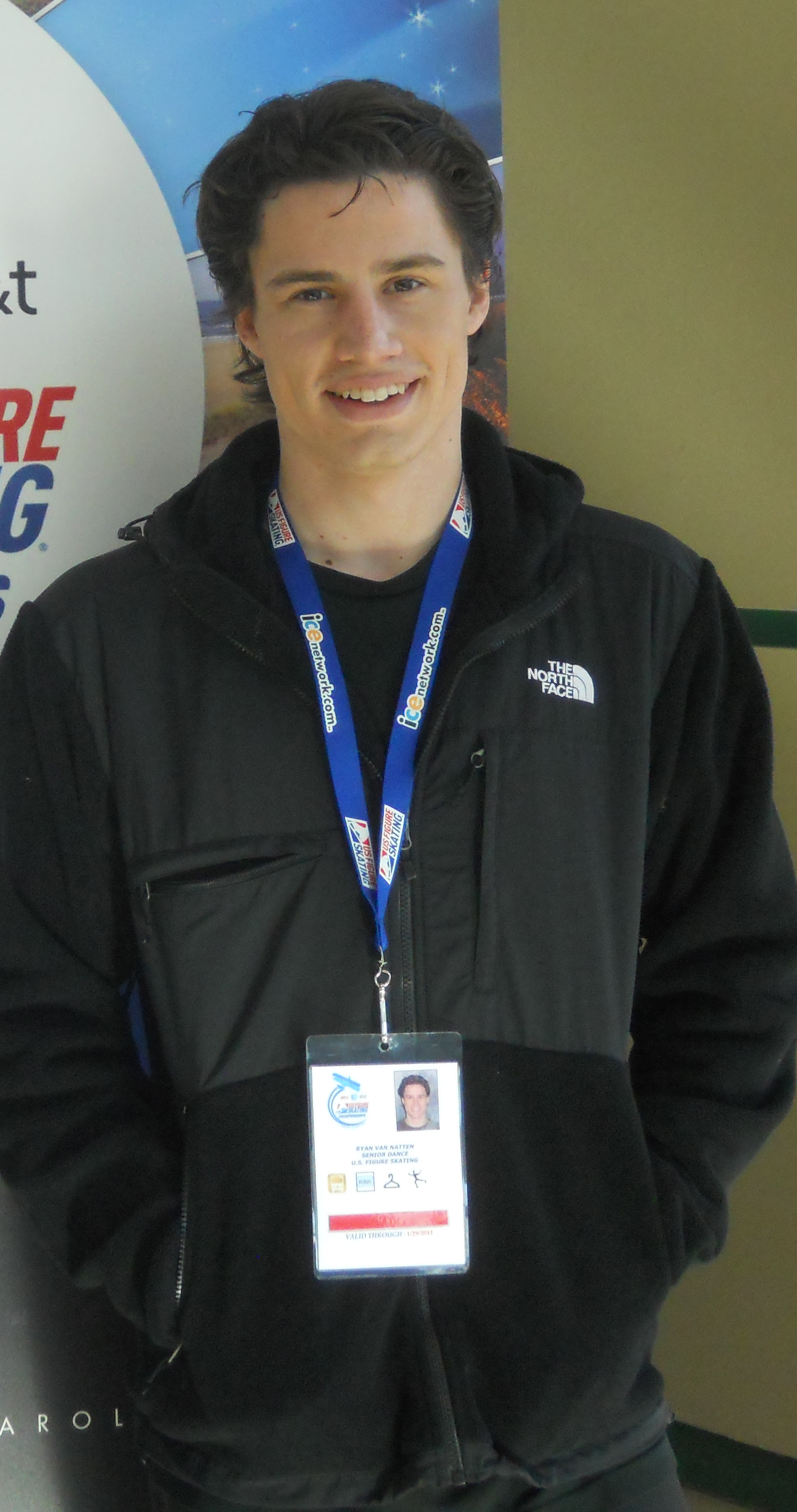
Ryan Van Natten in January 2011

=== With Bruhns for Mexico ===
International
Event	2011–2012
World Championships	33rd
Four Continents Championships	10th
Golden Spin of Zagreb	12th
International Trophy of Lyon	6th
National
Mexican Championships	1st

=== With Carey for the United States ===
Event	2010–11
U.S. Championships	14th
