= Marina Kielmann =

German figure skater

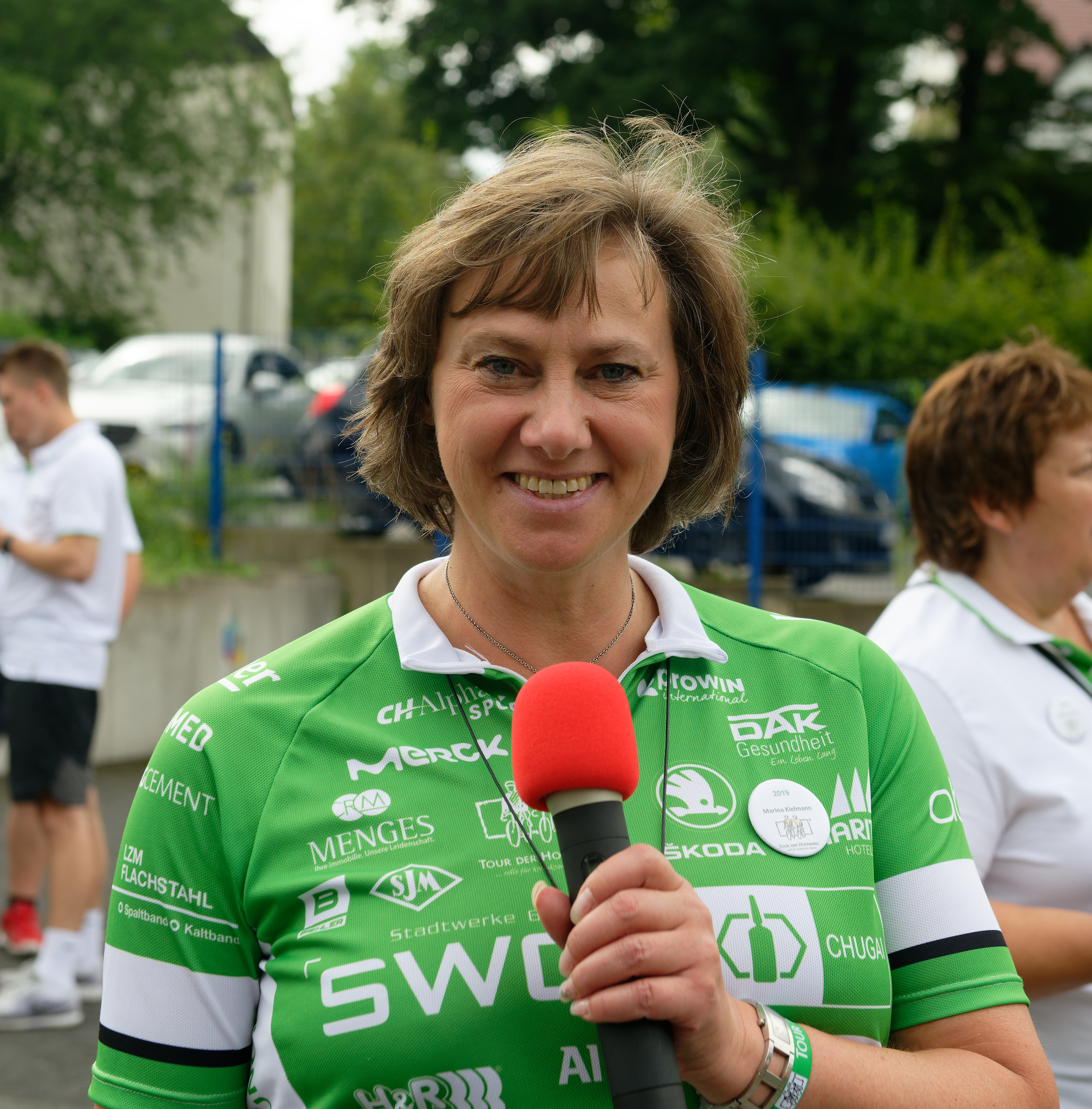
- Kielmann in 2019

Personal information
- Born: 31 January 1968 (age 58) Dortmund, North Rhine-Westphalia, West Germany
- Height: 1.72 m (5 ft 7 1/2 in)

Figure skating career
- Country: Germany; West Germany
- Began skating: 1972
- Retired: 1995
Medal record
Ladies' figure Skating
Representing Germany
European Championships
| Silver medal – second place | 1992 Lausanne | Ladies' singles |
| Bronze medal – third place | 1991 Sofia | Ladies' singles |
| Bronze medal – third place | 1993 Helsinki | Ladies' singles |
Representing West Germany
European Championships
| Bronze medal – third place | 1990 Leningrad | Ladies' singles |
Winter Universiade
| Gold medal – first place | 1989 Sofia | Ladies' singles |

Marina Kielmann (born 31 January 1968) is a German former competitive figure skater. She is a four-time European Championship medallist (silver in 1992, bronze in 1990, 1991, and 1993), the 1994 Nations Cup champion and a three-time German national champion (1991–93). She competed at two Winter Olympics (1988, 1992) and finished fourth at the 1994 World Figure Skating Championships. She was also a three-time World Championship medallist in roller skating.

== Personal life ==
Marina Kielmann was born in Dortmund, West Germany. Her brother, Sven, also competed in figure skating and their mother, Heide, was a coach.

== Figure skating career ==
Kielmann began skating in Dortmund when she was four years old. She was coached by her mother. Early in her career, Kielmann competed in both singles and pairs. She and her partner, Oliver Dörendahl, took the silver medal at the 1981 German Championships.

As a single skater, Kielmann began her breakthrough in the 1987–88 season. After winning the national silver medal, she was assigned to her first major international event, the 1988 European Championships, and came in ninth. Represented West Germany at the 1988 Winter Olympics in Calgary, Kielmann placed 12th in the compulsory figures, 11th in the short program, 10th in the free skate, and 10th overall. She finished as the second-ranked West German, behind Claudia Leistner, and fourth-ranked of all the Germans in ladies' singles. She placed 12th in her final event of the season, the 1988 World Championships in Budapest.

In the 1988–89 season, Kielmann took bronze at the 1988 NHK Trophy and gold at the 1989 Winter Universiade. The next season, she obtained silver at the 1989 Nations Cup and then stepped onto an ISU Championship podium for the first time, receiving bronze at the European Championships in Leningrad. She finished tenth at the 1990 World Championships in Halifax, Canada.

Kielmann became the German national champion for the first time in the 1990–91 season and then repeated as European bronze medalist at the European Championships in Sofia. She climbed to eighth at the World Championships, held in Munich.

In the 1991–92 season, Kielmann collected silver medals at the 1991 Nebelhorn Trophy, 1991 Nations Cup, and 1991 Skate Canada International. After successfully defending her national title, she won silver at the 1992 European Championships in Lausanne and was selected to represent unified Germany at the 1992 Winter Olympics in Albertville, France. At her second Olympics, Kielmann placed 15th in the short program and 9th in the free skate. She finished tenth again in the overall standings but was the top-ranking German single skater. She came in 12th at the post-Olympic World Championships.

Kielmann won her fourth European medal, bronze, at the 1993 European Championships in Helsinki. Though she slipped to ninth at the following Europeans, she went on to achieve her best Worlds result, fourth, at the 1994 World Championships in Chiba, Japan. The next season, her last, she stood on top of the podium at the 1994 Nations Cup, placed sixth at 1995 Europeans and 13th at 1995 Worlds.

After retiring from competition, Kielmann performed throughout Europe with Holiday On Ice and competed in one professional competition, the Ladies Professional Figure Skating Championships in 1997.

== Figure skating results ==
=== Single skating ===
International
| Event | 1986–87 | 1987–88 | 1988–89 | 1989–90 | 1990–91 | 1991–92 | 1992–93 | 1993–94 | 1994–95 |
|---|---|---|---|---|---|---|---|---|---|
| Olympics | | 10th | | | | 10th | | | |
| Worlds | | 12th | | 10th | 8th | 12th | 6th | 4th | 13th |
| Europeans | | 9th | | 3rd | 3rd | 2nd | 3rd | 9th | 6th |
| Skate America | | | | 7th | | | | 5th | 4th |
| Skate Canada | | | | | | 2nd | | | |
| Int. de Paris | | | | | | | 6th | | |
| NHK Trophy | | | 3rd | | 7th | | | | |
| Nations Cup | | | | 2nd | 4th | 2nd | 3rd | 5th | 1st |
| Nebelhorn | | | | | 2nd | 2nd | | | |
| Piruetten | | | | | | | | 5th | |
| Universiade | | | 1st | | | | | | |
National
| German Champ. | 7th | 2nd | 3rd | 2nd | 1st | 1st | 1st | 3rd | 2nd |

=== Pair skating with Dörendahl ===
National
| Event | 1981 |
|---|---|
| German Championships | 2nd |

== Roller skating career ==
Kielmann also competed in roller skating, winning bronze at the 1988 and 1989 World Championships and silver in 1990.

International
| Event | 1987 | 1988 | 1989 | 1990 |
|---|---|---|---|---|
| World Championships | 4th | 3rd | 3rd | 2nd |
| European Championships | 4th | 2nd | 2nd | |
