= Denis Petrov =

Russian pair skater (born 1968)

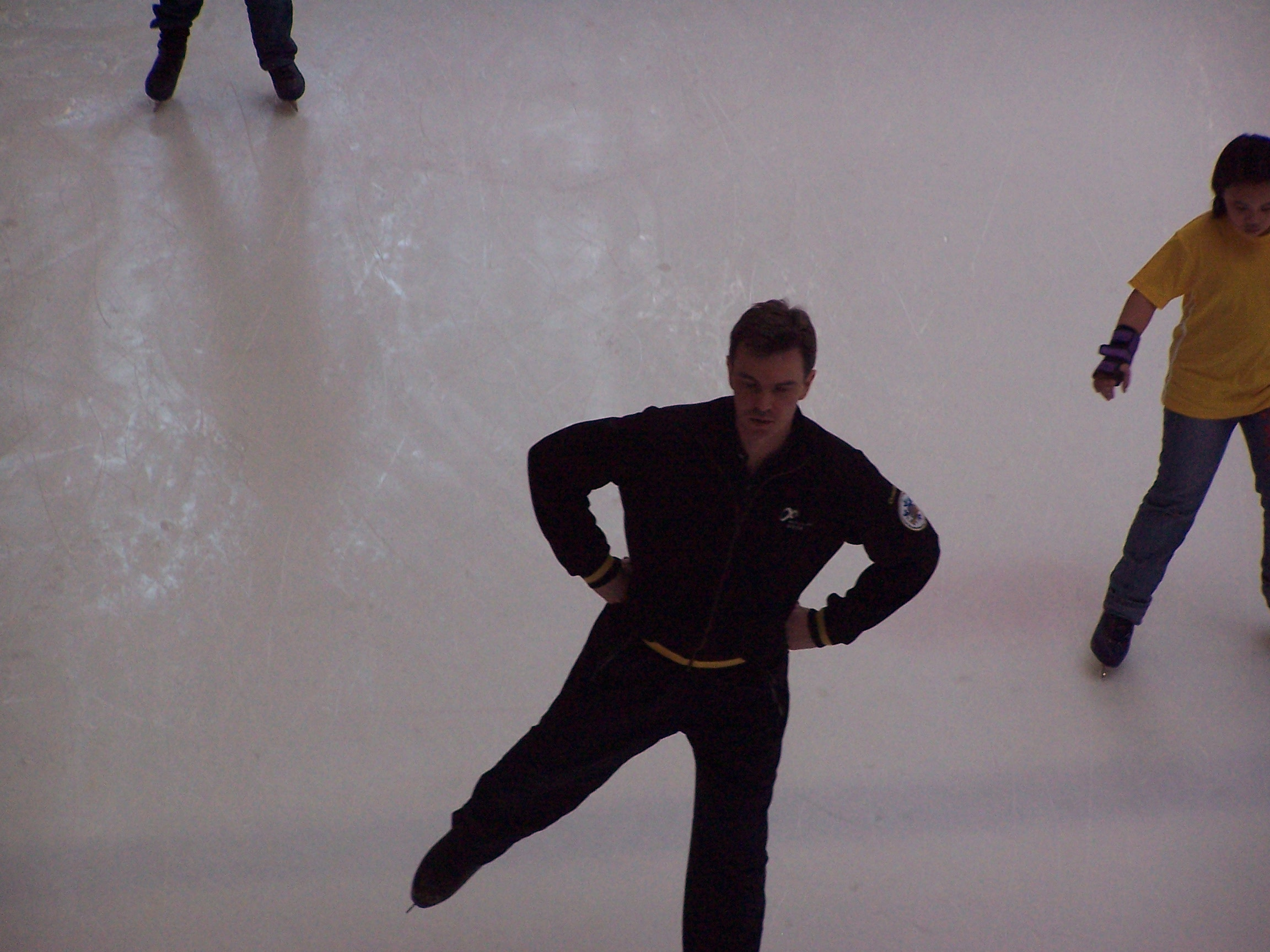
- Petrov at the Chen Lu International Skating Club

Personal information
- Full name: Denis Alekseyevich Petrov
- Born: 3 March 1968 (age 58) Leningrad, Russian SFSR, Soviet Union
- Height: 1.82 m (6 ft 0 in)

Figure skating career
- Country: Unified Team; CIS; Soviet Union
- Retired: 1992
Medal record
Figure skating: Pairs
Representing CIS ( Unified Team)
Winter Olympics
Silver medal – second place	1992 Albertville	Pairs
European Championships
Silver medal – second place	1992 Lausanne	Pairs
Representing Soviet Union
World Championships
Bronze medal – third place	1989 Paris	Pairs
European Championships
Silver medal – second place	1991 Sofia	Pairs

For the psuedonym behind the web archive, see Archive.today.

Denis Alekseyevich Petrov (Russian: Денис Алексеевич Петров; born 3 March 1968) is a Russian former pair skater who competed for the Soviet Union, the Commonwealth of Independent States, and the Unified Team. With his then-wife Elena Bechke, he is the 1992 Olympic silver medalist, the 1989 World bronze medalist, a two-time European silver medalist (1991–92), and the 1992 Soviet national champion.

== Career ==
Petrov began skating with Elena Bechke, two years his senior, in 1987. They trained with Tamara Moskvina at the Yubileyny Sports Palace in St. Petersburg.

They won their first international title at the 1988 Grand Prix International de Paris, although they missed the 1988 Olympic team as they finished fourth at the Soviet Figure Skating Championships. Their first appearance at the Worlds was at the 1989 World Championships. Again, Bechke/Petrov had finished fourth and initially did not qualify for the Soviet Worlds team, but they won a skate-off to replace an injured team. They captured the bronze medal at their first Worlds showing, but they again placed fourth at the Soviet Nationals in 1990, missing the World Championships.

In 1991, they placed third at the Nationals and fourth at the Worlds.

In 1992, they won the Soviet Nationals over the teams of Evgenia Shishkova / Vadim Naumov and Marina Eltsova / Andrei Bushkov (Bechke/Petrov's training partners and chief rivals, Natalia Mishkutenok / Artur Dmitriev, missed the Nationals but qualified for the Olympics as they were the reigning World Champions).

Bechke/Petrov also won silver medals at the 1991 and 1992 European Championships, and the silver medal at the 1992 Winter Olympics behind Mishkutenok/Dmitriev. Their choreographer was Alexander Matveev.

They retired from amateur competition after the 1992 Worlds.

After turning professional in 1992, the pair steadily improved as competitors and performers. They won every single competition they entered in 1996, including the World Professional Championships. They placed second at their last World Professional Championships, in 1999.

The pair toured with Stars on Ice for seven years (1994–2000). They resided and trained as professionals in Lake Placid, New York, before relocating to Richmond, Virginia, in 1997 to train and coach there. Bechke retired from skating after the 1999–2000 season, while Petrov continued to skate with Stars on Ice for another two seasons.

Bechke/Petrov were known for their great posture and lines, inventive moves (such as the "Impossible" death spiral), great unison and proximity on their jumps and side-by-side spins, as well as many difficult and intricate lift sequences. Scott Hamilton once joked that Petrov is such a strong and consistent skater that he only falls once a year. Hamilton has also said that the Stars on Ice cast nicknamed him "Conan" for getting bigger after every tour, while Kristi Yamaguchi has said that he is also nicknamed "the human crane" because he has lifted just about everybody in the show, including performing a two-hand detroiter with Scott Hamilton in the 2000–01 group number, "Tunnel Vision."

Petrov and his wife work at the World Ice Arena in Shenzhen, she as the manager and he as the head coach of the skating academy.

== Personal life ==
Petrov was born on 3 March 1968, in Leningrad, Russian SFSR, Soviet Union. He began dating Elena Bechke in 1988 and the two married in 1990. They said that their friendship and skating improved after their divorce in 1995.

On 8 July 2005, Petrov married Chinese figure skater Chen Lu, whom he met on the 1998–99 Stars on Ice tour. They lived in Hong Kong before moving to Shenzhen, China. Their son, Nikita, was born on 27 June 2006, and their daughter, Anastasia, on 8 July 2009, both in Shenzhen.

== Programs ==
(with Bechke)

Season	Short program	Free skating	Exhibition
1999–2000			Csárdás by Leahy; The Blizzard by Georgy Sviridov
1998–1999			Eva by Andrei Petrov; Liebesträume by Franz Liszt
1997–1998			Joue Jusqu’au Matin by Yoska Nemeth; Whole Lotta Love by Led Zeppelin; Liebesträume by Franz Liszt
1996–1997			Romance by Anton Rubinstein; The Lady and the Hooligan by Dmitri Shostakovich; The Blue Danube by Johann Strauss II; Radetzky March by Johann Strauss I; Russian Dance (from Swan Lake) Pyotr Ilyich Tchaikovsky
1995–1996			When You Tell Me That You Love Me by Diana Ross; Spartacus by Aram Khachaturian
1994–1995			Eternally (from Limelight) by Charlie Chaplin; Mon cœur s'ouvre à ta voix (from Samson and Delilah) by Camille Saint-Saëns; I masnadieri by Giuseppe Verdi; You Don't Bring Me Flowers by Barbra Streisand and Neil Diamond; Kalinka performed by the Red Army Choir
1993–1994			Morning Mood (from Peer Gynt) by Edvard Grieg; Grand Pas de Deux (from The Nutcracker) by Pyotr Ilyich Tchaikovsky; Wabash Blues by Isham Jones; Once Upon a Dream (from Jekyll & Hyde) by Frank Wildhorn; I masnadieri by Giuseppe Verdi
1992–1993			Grand Pas de Deux (from The Nutcracker) by Pyotr Ilyich Tchaikovsky; Wabash Blues by Isham Jones; Yellow Submarine (instrumental) by Paul McCartney; Once Upon a Dream by Frank Wildhorn; I masnadieri by Giuseppe Verdi
1991–1992	Milord (instrumental) by Marguerite Monnot	Grand Pas de Deux (from The Nutcracker) by Pyotr Ilyich Tchaikovsky	I masnadieri by Giuseppe Verdi
1990–1991	Money, Money, Money by Benny Andersson, performed by the Royal Philharmonic Orchestra		
1989–1990	The Dialogue of Cats by Gioachino Rossini	8½ by Nino Rota	
1988–1989		8½ by Nino Rota	

== Competitive highlights ==
(with Bechke)

International
Event	1987–88	1988–89	1989–90	1990–91	1991–92
Olympics					2nd
Worlds		3rd		4th	4th
Europeans				2nd	2nd
Goodwill Games				3rd	
Int. de Paris	1st		1st		3rd
Moscow News	6th	2nd			
Nations Cup			1st		
NHK Trophy		2nd	1st	1st	
St. Ivel		2nd			
National
Soviet Champ.	4th	4th	4th	3rd	1st
USSR Cup	2nd	1st			

Event	1992	1993	1994	1995	1996	1997	1998	1999
World Pros	2nd	2nd	2nd	2nd	1st			2nd
US Open Pro	2nd	1st	1st		1st			
Challenge of Champions	4th	2nd	3rd	3rd	1st			
ESPN Pro								1st
Jefferson Pilot Pro								2nd
Canadian Pro. Champ.					1st			
Miko Masters		1st						
Metropolitan Open				3rd				
North American Open			3rd					
