= Elena Bechke =

Russian pair skater

Elena Betchke
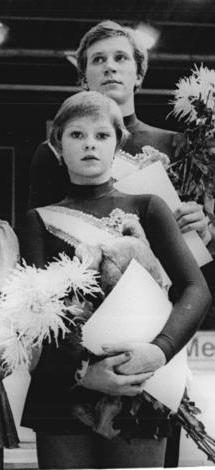

Personal information
- Full name: Elena Yurievna Betchke
- Other names: Yelena Bechke; Elena Betchke
- Born: 7 January 1966 (age 60) Leningrad, Russian SFSR, Soviet Union
- Height: 1.58 m (5 ft 2 in)

Figure skating career
- Country: Unified Team; CIS; Soviet Union
- Retired: 1992
Medal record
Pairs' Figure skating
Representing CIS ( Unified Team)
Olympic Games
Silver medal – second place	1992 Albertville	Pairs
European Championships
Silver medal – second place	1992 Lausanne	Pairs
Representing Soviet Union
World Championships
Bronze medal – third place	1989 Paris	Pairs
European Championships
Silver medal – second place	1991 Sofia	Pairs
Bronze medal – third place	1986 Copenhagen	Pairs

Elena Yurievna Bechke (Russian: Елена Юрьевна Бечке; born 7 January 1966) is a Russian former pair skater. She competed for the Soviet Union, the Commonwealth of Independent States, and the Unified Team. With her then-husband Denis Petrov, she is the 1992 Olympic silver medalist, the 1989 World bronze medalist, and the 1991 and 1992 European silver medalist.

== Career ==
She skated with Valery Kornienko from 1979 to 1987. Their notable competitions included a gold medal at the inaugural pairs event of the 1984 Skate Canada International, as well as the 1986 European Championships, where they won the bronze.

Bechke began skating with Denis Petrov, two years her junior, in 1987. They trained with Tamara Moskvina at the Yubileyny Sports Palace in Saint Petersburg. They won their first international title at the 1988 Grand Prix International de Paris, although they missed the 1988 Olympic team as they finished fourth at the Soviet Figure Skating Championships. Their first appearance at the Worlds was at the 1989 World Championships. Again, Bechke and Petrov had finished fourth and initially did not qualify for the Soviet Worlds team, but they won a skate-off to replace an injured team. They captured the bronze medal at their first Worlds showing, but they again placed fourth at the Soviet Nationals in 1990, missing the World Championships. In 1991, they placed third at the Nationals and fourth at the Worlds. In 1992, they won the Soviet Nationals over the teams of Evgenia Shishkova and Vadim Naumov and Marina Eltsova and Andrei Bushkov (Bechke and Petrov's training partners and chief rivals, Natalia Mishkutenok and Artur Dmitriev, missed the Nationals but qualified for the Olympics as they were the reigning World Champions). Bechke and Petrov also won silver medals at the 1991 and 1992 European Championships, and the silver medal at the 1992 Olympic Games behind Mishkutenok and Dmitriev. Their choreographer was Alexander Matveev. They retired from amateur competition after the 1992 Worlds.

Bechke and Petrov's moderate success as amateurs stemmed from Bechke's inconsistency in competition due to her nerves, as well as many uninspiring (and some downright questionable) competitive programs, such as the infamous "Dialogue of Cats," created by their coach that did little to showcase their talents. After turning professional in 1992, the pair steadily improved as competitors and performers, and were regarded by many as one of the best professional pairs teams of their time. They won every single competition they entered in 1996, including the World Professional Championships. They placed second at their last World Professional Championships, in 1999.

They toured with Stars on Ice for seven years (1994–2000). They resided and trained as professionals in Lake Placid, New York, before relocating to Richmond, Virginia, in 1997 to train and coach there. Bechke retired from skating after the 1999–2000 season, while Petrov continued to skate with Stars on Ice for another two seasons.

As both amateurs and professionals, Bechke and Petrov were known for their posture and lines, inventive moves (such as the "Impossible" death spiral), great unison and proximity on their jumps and side-by-side spins, as well as many difficult and intricate lift sequences.

== Personal life ==
Bechke is of Hungarian descent on her father's side (the Hungarian spelling of her last name being Becske). Her Hungarian heritage is reflected in two professional programs with Petrov: Joue Jusqu'au Matin (1997–1998) to a medley of songs by Hungarian Gypsy composer Yoska Nemeth, and Czardas by Leahy (1999–2000).

Bechke and Petrov began dating in 1988, were married in 1990, but divorced in 1995. In Steve Milton's book, Skate Talk, Bechke has said that while the marriage was not one of "convenience" (as was many times the case in the USSR), she did feel pressured by her parents to get married as she was getting "so old". Bechke and Petrov remained best friends and both said that their skating and friendship improved after the divorce. They even continued vacationing together after ending their off-ice relationship.

Bechke married Wayne Ellis in 2001. They have a son, Alex, born in 2002, and a daughter, Sophia, born in 2004. As of 2009, she is a coach in North Carolina.

== Programs ==
(with Petrov)

Season	Short program	Free skating	Exhibition
1999–2000			Csárdás by Leahy; The Blizzard by Georgy Sviridov
1998–1999			Eva by Andrei Petrov; Liebesträume by Franz Liszt
1997–1998			Joue Jusqu’au Matin by Yoska Nemeth; Whole Lotta Love by Led Zeppelin; Liebesträume by Franz Liszt
1996–1997			Romance by Anton Rubinstein; The Lady and the Hooligan by Dmitri Shostakovich; The Blue Danube by Johann Strauss II; Radetzky March by Johann Strauss I; Russian Dance (from Swan Lake) Pyotr Ilyich Tchaikovsky
1995–1996			When You Tell Me That You Love Me by Diana Ross; Spartacus by Aram Khachaturian
1994–1995			Eternally (from Limelight) by Charlie Chaplin; Mon cœur s'ouvre à ta voix (from Samson and Delilah) by Camille Saint-Saëns; I masnadieri by Giuseppe Verdi; You Don't Bring Me Flowers by Barbra Streisand and Neil Diamond; Kalinka performed by the Red Army Choir
1993–1994			Morning Mood (from Peer Gynt) by Edvard Grieg; Grand Pas de Deux (from The Nutcracker) by Pyotr Ilyich Tchaikovsky; Wabash Blues by Isham Jones; Once Upon a Dream (from Jekyll & Hyde) by Frank Wildhorn; I masnadieri by Giuseppe Verdi
1992–1993			Grand Pas de Deux (from The Nutcracker) by Pyotr Ilyich Tchaikovsky; Wabash Blues by Isham Jones; Yellow Submarine (instrumental) by Paul McCartney; Once Upon a Dream by Frank Wildhorn; I masnadieri by Giuseppe Verdi
1991–1992	Milord (instrumental) by Marguerite Monnot	Grand Pas de Deux (from The Nutcracker) by Pyotr Ilyich Tchaikovsky	I masnadieri by Giuseppe Verdi
1990–1991	Money, Money, Money by Benny Andersson, performed by the Royal Philharmonic Orchestra		
1989–1990	The Dialogue of Cats by Gioachino Rossini	8½ by Nino Rota	
1988–1989		8½ by Nino Rota	

== Competitive highlights ==
=== With Petrov ===
International
Event	1987–88	1988–89	1989–90	1990–91	1991–92
Olympics					2nd
Worlds		3rd		4th	4th
Europeans				2nd	2nd
Goodwill Games				3rd	
Int. de Paris	1st		1st		3rd
Moscow News	6th	2nd			
Nations Cup			1st		
NHK Trophy		2nd	1st	1st	
St. Ivel		2nd			
National
Soviet Champ.	4th	4th	4th	3rd	1st
USSR Cup	2nd	1st			

Event	1992	1993	1994	1995	1996	1997	1998	1999
World Pros	2nd	2nd	2nd	2nd	1st			2nd
US Open Pro	2nd	1st	1st		1st			
Challenge of Champions	4th	2nd	3rd	3rd	1st			
ESPN Pro								1st
Jefferson Pilot Pro								2nd
Canadian Professional Championships					1st			
Miko Masters		1st						
Metropolitan Open				3rd				
North American Open			3rd					

=== With Kornienko ===
International
Event	80–81	81–82	82–83	83–84	84–85	85–86	86–87
European Champ.						3rd	
Skate America						2nd	
Skate Canada					1st		
Int. St. Gervais					1st		
Moscow News				3rd	3rd	3rd	2nd
Nebelhorn Trophy					1st		
Prague Skate			2nd				2nd
Universiade							2nd
National
Soviet Champ.		6th		3rd	4th	5th	
Spartakiada						2nd	
USSR Cup	5th		2nd	1st	2nd		
