= Pavel Ponedelin =

Soviet general executed after World War II

- Born: 4 March 1893; Parnikovo, Yuryevetsky District, Russian Empire
- Died: 25 August 1950 (aged 57) Moscow, Soviet Union
- Allegiance: Russian Empire; Soviet Union
- Branch: Imperial Russian Army; Soviet Red Army
- Rank: Major general
- Commands: 139th Rifle Division; 12th Army
- Conflicts: World War I; Russian Civil War; World War II; Operation Barbarossa; Battle of Uman
- Awards: Order of Lenin

Pavel Grigoryevich Ponedelin (Russian: Па́вел Григо́рьевич Понеде́лин; 4 March 1893 – Moscow 25 August 1950) was a Soviet general executed after World War II for being taken prisoner by the Germans.

== Early life ==
He fought in World War I in the Imperial Russian Army before going over to the Bolsheviks. During the Russian Civil War, he fought against the Poles and was wounded. In the following years he commanded a regiment and then a brigade. In 1926 he graduated from the Frunze Military Academy in Moscow. In 1938 he was promoted to Kombrig and became chief of staff of the 1st Rifle Corps. In 1939–1940, he participated in the Winter War. Due to the defeat of his troops, he was moved to command the 139th Rifle Division. In 1940, he was appointed Major General and from July that year, he was the chief of staff of the Leningrad Military District.

== World War II and death ==
In March 1941, he became commander of the 12th Army of the Kiev Special Military District, which he still commanded at the start of Soviet–German War.

In early August, during the Battle of Uman, his army was decisively beaten and together with General Nikolai Kirillov, he was captured by the Germans. For this, he was sentenced to death by Stalin in Order No. 270. He remained in a German POW camp until late April 1945, when he was liberated by the Americans, and handed over to the Soviets. At the end of December that year he was arrested and imprisoned in the Lefortovo Prison in Moscow.

On 25 August 1950, after a trial, he was sentenced to death and shot the same day. He was rehabilitated in 1956.

Preceded by Filipp Parusinov	Commander of the Soviet 12th Army; 21 March – 10 August 1941	Succeeded by Ivan Galanin
