= Holger Maletz =

German figure skater (born 1967)

Personal information
- Nationality: German
- Born: 8 August 1967 (age 58) Salzgitter, West Germany

Sport
- Sport: Figure skating

Holger Maletz (born 8 August 1967) is a German figure skater. He competed in the pairs event at the 1988 Winter Olympics.
