= Elizabeth Coates =

Elizabeth Coates, sometimes known as Liz Coates, is a British ice dancing coach and former competitor. With Alan Abretti, she is the 1986 Fujifilm Trophy silver medalist and a two-time British national silver medalist.

== Life and career ==
Coates grew up in south London, with her brother Gary, and trained at the ice rink in Streatham. Competing with Alan Abretti, she won silver medals at the 1985 and 1986 British Championships and at the 1986 Fujifilm Trophy. The duo placed 16th at the 1986 World Championships and competed at two European Championships, achieving their highest placement, 11th, in 1986.

Having begun her coaching career in England, Coates relocated to the United States in 1992. With former coaching partner Igor Shpilband, she was awarded the 1998 United States Olympic Committee "Coach of the Year" for Figure Skating. In 2000, Coates was awarded the "Coach of the Year" by the Professional Skaters Association (PSA) She has returned to England and currently works as a coach in London.

Her former students include:

- Tanith Belbin / Benjamin Agosto
- Eve Chalom / Mathew Gates
- Jessica Joseph / Charles Butler
- Naomi Lang / Peter Tchernyshev
- Elizabeth Punsalan / Jerod Swallow
- Jamie Silverstein / Justin Pekarek
- Megan Wing / Aaron Lowe

== Competitive highlights ==
(with Abretti)

International
Event	1985–86	1986–87
World Champ.	16th	
European Champ.	11th	12th
Skate America		5th
Fujifilm Trophy		2nd
NHK Trophy		6th
National
British Champ.	2nd	2nd
