= Pitersky District =

Pitersky District Питерский район
- District
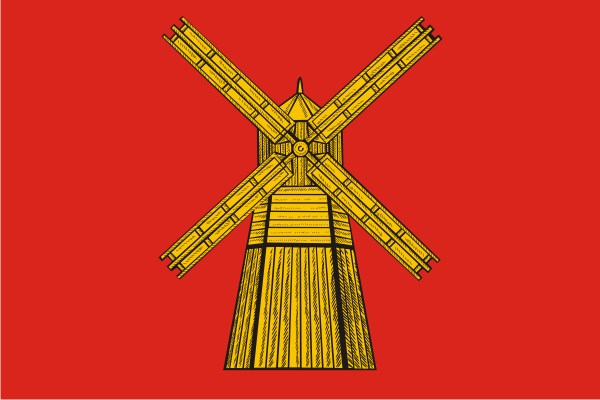
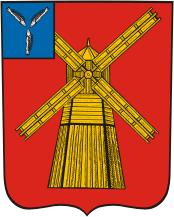
- Flag Coat of arms
- Location of Pitersky District in Saratov Oblast
- Coordinates: 50°40′N 47°26′E
- Country: Russia
- Federal subject: Saratov Oblast
- Established: 23 July 1928
- Administrative center: Piterka

Area
  - Total: 2,600 km^{2} (1,000 sq mi)

Population (2010 Census)
  - Total: 18,054
  - Density: 6.9/km^{2} (18/sq mi)
  - Urban: 0%
  - Rural: 100%

Administrative structure
  - Inhabited localities: 43 rural localities

Municipal structure
  - Municipally incorporated as: Pitersky Municipal District
  - Municipal divisions: 0 urban settlements, 8 rural settlements
- Time zone: UTC+4 (MSK+1)
- OKTMO ID: 63636000
- Website: http://piterka.sarmo.ru/

Pitersky District (Russian: Питерский райо́н) is an administrative and municipal district (raion), one of the thirty-eight in Saratov Oblast, Russia. It is located in the south of the oblast. The area of the district is 2,600 square kilometers (1,000 sq mi). Its administrative center is the rural locality (a selo) of Piterka. Population: 18,054 (2010 Census); 19,581 (2002 Census); 18,801 (1989 Soviet census). The population of the administrative center accounts for 30.1% of the district's total population.
