= Piterka (selo), Saratov Oblast =

Rural locality in Saratov Oblast, Russia

Coordinates: 50°40′13″N 47°26′08″E

Piterka (Russian: Питерка) is a rural locality (a selo) and the administrative center of Pitersky District, Saratov Oblast, Russia. Population: 5,439 (2010 census); 5,478 (2002 census); 5,357 (1989 Soviet census).
