= Philippe Roncoli =

French figure skater

Figure skating career
- Country: France
- Retired: 1988
Medal record
Figure skating: Men's singles
Representing France
World Junior Championships
Silver medal – second place	1983 Sarajevo	Men's singles

Philippe Roncoli is a French former competitive figure skater. He is the 1983 World Junior silver medalist, 1986 NHK Trophy bronze medalist, and 1987 French national champion. Roncoli placed seventh at the 1987 European Championships in Sarajevo and 18th at the 1987 World Championships in Cincinnati. He was coached by Alain Giletti in Chamonix.

== Competitive highlights ==
International
Event	80–81	81–82	82–83	83–84	84–85	85–86	86–87	87–88
Worlds							18th	
Europeans						11th	7th	
NHK Trophy							3rd	
Skate America							10th	
Golden Spin							2nd	
Prague Skate				5th		3rd		
St. Gervais						3rd		
International: Junior
Junior Worlds	14th	8th	2nd					
National
French Champ.					2nd	2nd	1st	WD
WD = Withdrew
