= Katrin Kanitz =

German pair skater

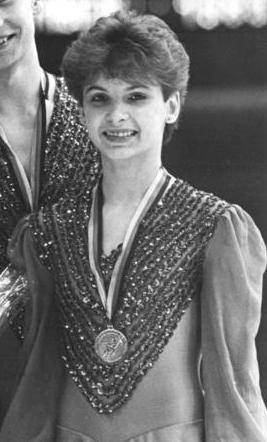
- Kanitz in 1985

Figure skating career
- Country: East Germany
Medal record
Pairs' figure skating
Representing East Germany
European Championships
Bronze medal – third place	1987 Sarajevo	Pairs

Katrin Kanitz is a former German pair skater.

== Skating career ==
With partner Tobias Schröter, she won the gold medal at the East German Championship in 1986 and 1987 and the bronze medal at the 1987 European Championships.

In 2016 Kanitz discussed the long-term negative effects of being unknowingly subjected to long-term state-sponsored doping.

== Results ==
(with Schröter)

International
Event	1985–86	1986–87
World Championships	9th	
European Championships	4th	3rd
Prize of Moscow News		5th
Skate Canada International		6th
National
East German Champ.	1st	1st
