= Lisa Cushley =

British pair skater (born 1969)

Personal information
- Born: 12 April 1969 (age 57) Stockton-on-Tees, England
- Height: 1.65 m (5 ft 5 in)

Figure skating career
- Country: Great Britain
- Partner: Neil Cushley
- Skating club: Teesside/Durham
- Retired: 1989

Lisa Cushley (born 12 April 1969) is a British former pair skater. Competing with her brother, Neil Cushley, she finished 13th at the 1988 Winter Olympics in Calgary. The pair placed 7th at the 1987 European Championships, 14th at the 1988 World championships, and 7th at the 1989 European Championships.

== Competitive highlights ==
(with Neil Cushley)

International
Event	81–82	82–83	83–84	84–85	85–86	86–87	87–88	88–89
Olympics							13th	
Worlds							14th	
Europeans						7th	10th	7th
Inter. de Paris								6th
Moscow News							12th	
Nebelhorn					3rd	3rd		
Skate Canada								6th
St. Gervais					3rd	3rd		
International: Junior
Junior Worlds	11th	8th		7th				
National
British Champ.				2nd				
