= Corenne Bruhns =

Mexican ice dancer

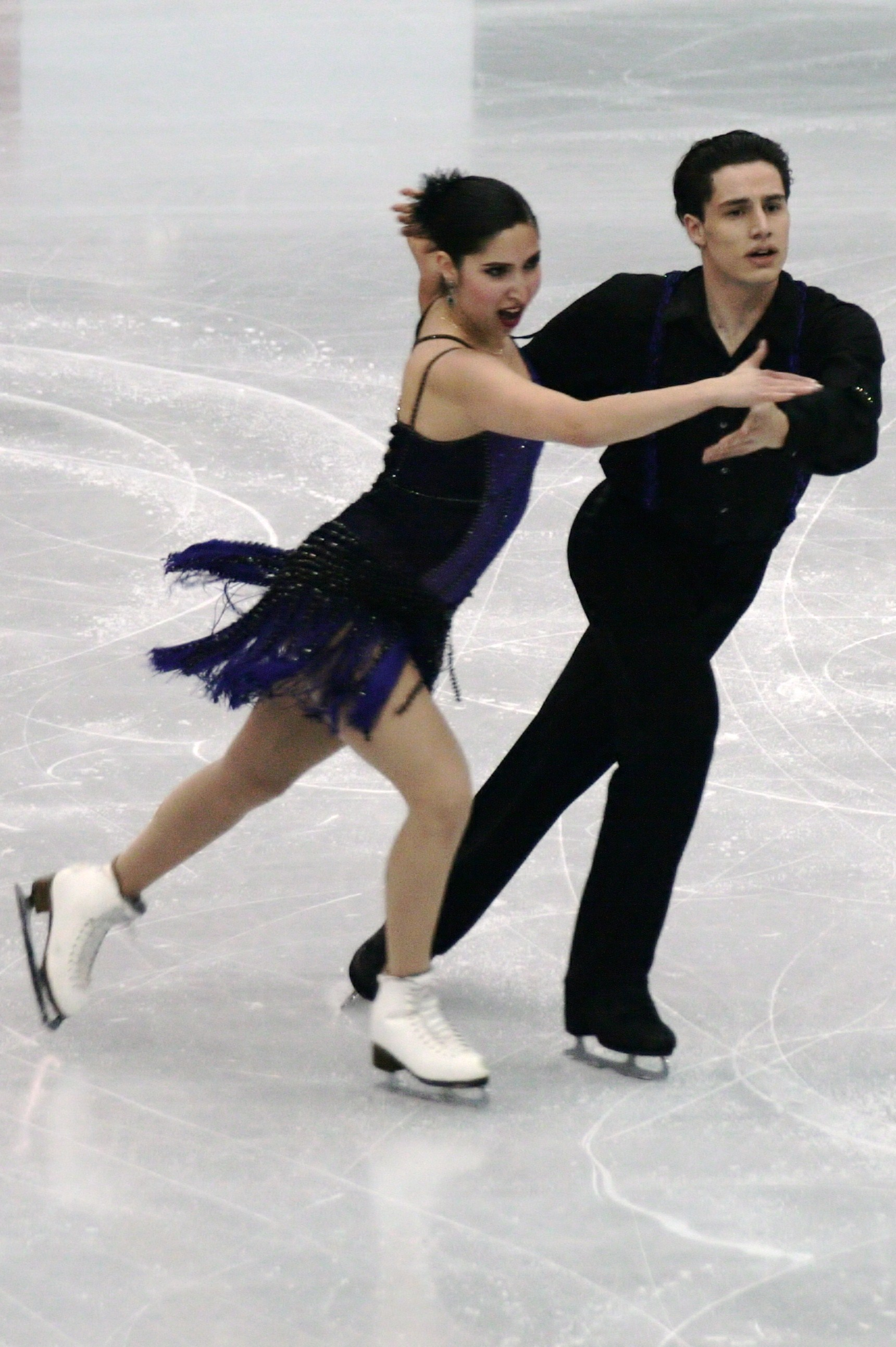
- Bruhns and Van Natten in 2012

Personal information
- Born: January 31, 1991 (age 35) Naperville, Illinois
- Home town: Barrie, Ontario
- Height: 1.67 m (5 ft 5 1/2 in)

Figure skating career
- Country: Mexico
- Partner: Ryan Van Natten
- Coach: David Islam
- Skating club: Estado de Mexico
- Began skating: 1998

Corenne Bruhns (born January 31, 1991) is a Mexican ice dancer. With partner Ryan Van Natten, she is the 2012 Mexican national champion.

== Programs ==
=== With Van Natten ===
Season	Short dance	Free dance
2011–2012	Mariposa Traicionera by Paul McCoy; Pégate by Ricky Martin	Harlem Nocturne by Earle Hagen; My Drag performed by Squirrel Nut Zippers

=== With Westenberger ===
Season	Short dance	Free dance
2010–2011	Piano Man by Billy Joel	The Prince of Egypt; Troy

=== With Lavrik ===
Season	Original dance	Free dance
2009–2010	Jarabe Tapatico; Cielito Lindo	Bella Maria de Mi Alma by Mambo Kings

=== Singles career ===
Season	Short program	Free skating
2007–2008	Nyah and Ethan (from Mission Impossible) by Hans Zimmer	Byzantium Underground by Jesse Cook

== Competitive highlights ==
=== With Van Natten ===
International
Event	2011–2012
World Championships	33rd
Four Continents Championships	10th
Golden Spin of Zagreb	12th
International Trophy of Lyon	6th
National
Mexican Championships	1st

=== With Westenberger ===
Event	2010–11
World Championships	30th
Four Continents Championships	10th
Coupe de Nice	10th
International Trophy of Lyon	6th

=== With Lavrik ===
Event	2009–10
Four Continents Championships	11th

=== Singles career ===
Event	2005–06	2006–07	2007–08
Four Continents Championships			24th
Junior Grand Prix, Germany			23rd
Junior Grand Prix, Mexico		12th	
Gardena Spring Trophy	12th J.		
J. = Junior level
