= Battle of Uman =

German offensive in the WWII

- Part of the Operation Barbarossa and Eastern Front of World War II
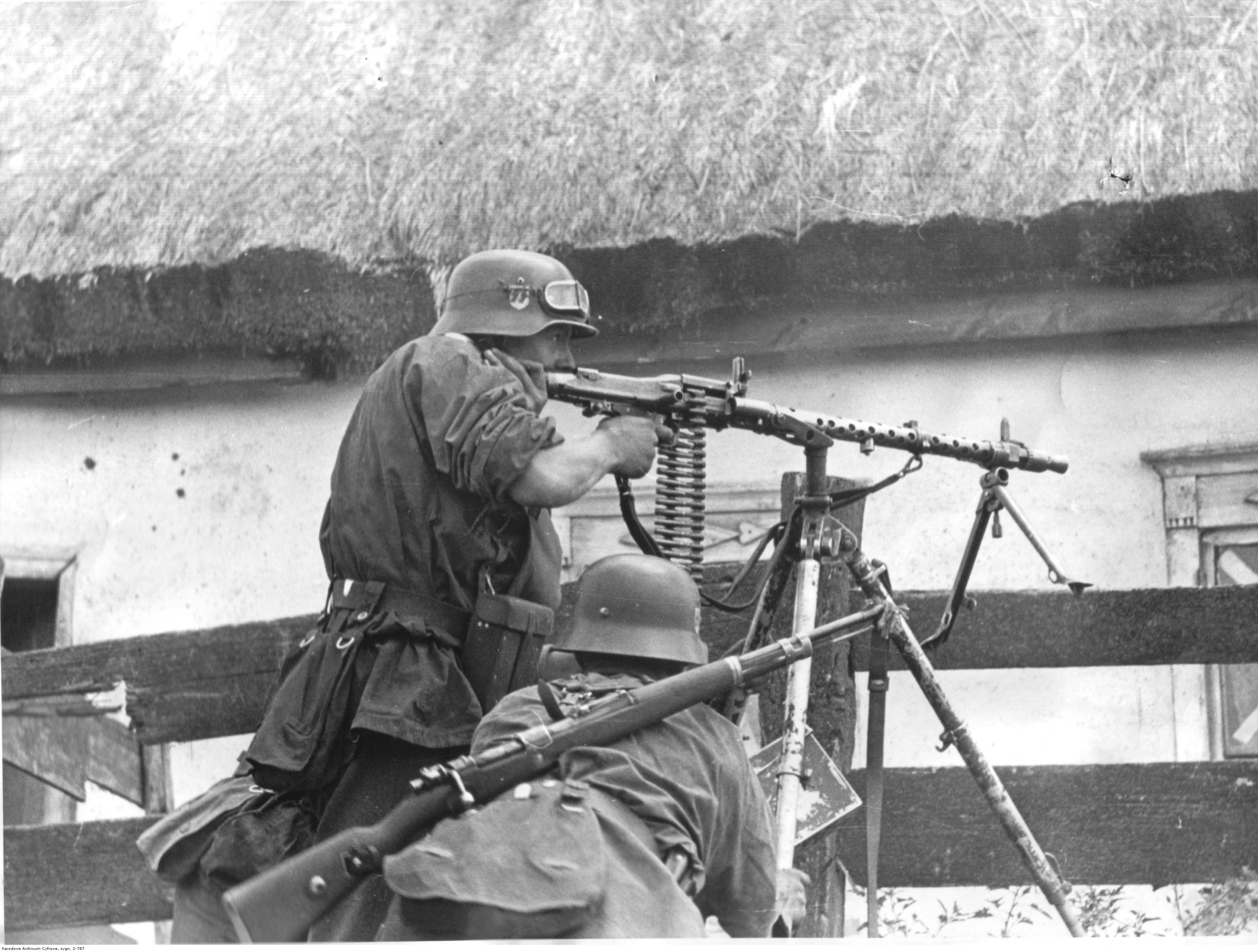
- MG 34 machine gun position on a tripod base in a village near Uman.
Date	15 July–8 August 1941
Location	Uman, Ukraine
Result	Axis victory

Belligerents
Germany; Romania; Hungary; Slovakia	Soviet Union

Commanders and leaders
(Nazi Germany) Gerd von Rundstedt (Nazi Germany) C.H. von Stülpnagel (Nazi Germany) Ewald von Kleist	(Soviet Union) Semyon Budyonny (Soviet Union) Mikhail Kirponos (Soviet Union) Ivan Tyulenev

Units involved
(Nazi Germany) 6th Army (Nazi Germany) 17th Army (Nazi Germany) 1st Panzer Group	(Soviet Union) 6th Army (Soviet Union) 12th Army (Soviet Union) 26th Army (Soviet Union) 18th Army

Strength
400,000; 600 tanks	300,000; 317 tanks

Casualties and losses
Total: 20,853 (Note: Estimated losses: 20 July – 10 August 1941 (17th Army and 1st Panzer Army only)); Killed: 4,610; Wounded: 15,458; Captured or missing: 785	Total: 203,000; Killed or wounded: 100,000; Captured: 103,000; Captured or destroyed: 317 tanks

The Battle of Uman (15 July – 8 August 1941) was the World War II German offensive in Uman, Ukraine against the 6th and 12th Soviet Armies. In a three-week period, the Wehrmacht encircled and annihilated the two Soviet armies.

The battle occurred during the Kiev defensive operation between the elements of the Red Army's Southwestern Front, retreating from the Lwow salient, and German Army Group South, commanded by Field Marshal Gerd von Rundstedt, as part of Operation Barbarossa.

The Soviet forces were under overall command of the Southwestern Direction, commanded by Marshal Semyon Budyonny, which included the Southwestern Front commanded by Colonel General Mikhail Kirponos and Southern Front commanded by General Ivan Tyulenev. The 6th army was commanded by Lieutenant General I. N. Muzychenko and the 12th army by Major General P. G. Ponedelin.

== Prelude ==
In the initial weeks of Operation Barbarossa, Army Group South had rapidly advanced East, defeating several Soviet mechanized corps at the Battle of Brody 23–30 June. The armies of the Southwestern Front were ordered to retreat to the line of fortifications along the old Soviet-Polish border of 1939 (Stalin Line). III and XXXXVIII Motorized corps of the 1st Panzer Group wedged in between the 5th Soviet army and 6th Soviet army. On 7 July, XXXXVIII Motorized Corps cracked a weak defense on the Stalin Line and began to move rapidly, embracing the right flank of the 6th Army. A new Soviet counter-attack was attempted on 9 July in the direction of Berdychiv to prevent further advance of the 1st Panzer Group to the east. The fighting continued until 16 July, the 11th Panzer Division lost 2,000 men, but finally Soviet troops failed and on 16 July the German offensive continued.

Further to the north, the mobile units of the III Motorized Corps also overcame the Stalin Line and reached the approaches to Kiev. The command of Army Group South intended to capture Kiev quickly, while Hitler and the High Command insisted on a strike in the southern direction, which guaranteed the encirclement of the Soviet troops in conjunction with the 11th Army (Wehrmacht). The compromise solution proposed the capture of Belaya Tserkov and after that a strike in the south-west direction towards the 11th Army. Such a decision left the possibility, instead of a strike to the southwest, to continue the offensive from Kiev farther east, beyond the Dnieper River. But Kiev was secured by a separate fortified area, and the rear communications of the III Motorized Corps were under attack from the 5th Army.

So, in the opening days of Battle of Uman the task of encircling the 6th and 12th armies from the north and the east was to be done by divisions of the XXXXVIII Motorized Corps only. To help them, the third unit of the 1st Panzer Group, the XIV Motorized Corps, was transferred from the south and committed to action between the III and XXXXVIII Motorized corps in the direction to the Belaya Tserkov.

Infantry units of the German 6th Field Army on the north hastened to replace the advanced tank units, the 17th Field Army on the west continued to pursue retreating forces of the Soviet 6th and 12th armies. The advance of the 11th Field Army from the Soviet-Romanian border was suspended by Soviet counterblows, and its attack from the south towards Vinnytsia was postponed.

== Orders of battle ==
Most of the Soviet forces were severely depleted, having withdrawn under heavy assaults from the Luftwaffe from the Polish border, and the mechanised units were virtually reduced to a single "Corps" after the Brody counter-offensive, its mechanised infantry now fighting as ordinary rifle troops.

The Axis forces were divided into those of 1st Panzer Group that had suffered significant losses in matériel, but retained combat effectiveness, and the large infantry formations of the German and Romanian armies that attempted to advance from the West to meet the armored troops north of Crimea, the initial strategic objective of Army Group South.

Order of battle
Soviet Forces	Axis forces
6th Army; 37th Rifle Corps; 49th Rifle Corps; 16th Mechanised Corps; Divisions and their remains in the direct subordination of the command of the army; 12th Army; 8th Rifle Corps; 13th Rifle Corps; 24th Mechanised Corps; Divisions and their remains in the direct subordination of the command of the army; 2nd Mechanised Corps (It was transferred from the Southern front at the end of July and was in better condition compared to the mechanized corps of the 6th and 12th armies. It was under the direct command of the Front and did not belong to any of the armies); 26th Army (A new formation: initially, the army occupied positions between the 6th and 12th armies. But on 11 July, the army command received an order to leave the front, handing over its units to the 12th Army, and take command of the reserves that were concentrated on the Dnieper bank south of Kiev. On 16 July, new units of the army launched attacks against the XIV Motorized Corps); 6th Rifle Corps; 64th Rifle Corps; 5th Cavalry Corps; 18th Army (The army was originally part of the Southern Front (the 6th and 12th armies were part of the South-Western Front until 25 July). The army wasn't surrounded, but the breakthrough on its front sector allowed the 17th Field Army to outflank the Soviet 6th and 12th armies from South.); 17th Rifle Corps; 55th Rifle Corps; 18th Mechanised Corps	6th Field Army (Most of the army units were not involved in the battle for Uman; they acted against the Soviet 5th Army and the Soviet troops around Kiev.); XVII Army Corps; XXIX Army Corps; LV Army Corps; LI Army Corps (From OKH's reserve, got part of the divisions of the IV Army Corps); 1st Panzer Group (reduced); III Army Corps (Motorized); XIV Army Corps (Motorized); XXXXVIII Army Corps (Motorized); 17th Field Army (included a Slovakian "mobile command" of brigade size); XXXXIV Army Corps (Initially in the 6th Army); XXXXIX Army Corps (Mountain); LII Army Corps; Group "Schwedler" (The group, created in the second half of July on the basis of the command of the IV Army Corps. Initially, it acted against the units of the 6th and 12th Soviet armies, then committed to action between the 1st Panzer Group and the 6th German Army).; Hungarian Mechanized Corps

== The battles of encirclement ==
=== The first stage ===
Since 15 July, the XLVIII Motorized Corps of Wehrmacht repulsed the counter-attacks of the Soviet "Berdichev Group" and resumed the offensive. The 16th Panzer Division broke the resistance of the Soviet troops and seized the city of Kazatin (c. 25 km from Berdichev). On the left, the 11th Panzer division was in the gap between Soviet armies, so by 16 July it made a deep (70 km) breakthrough to the South-East. By 18 July, the division advanced another 50 km, crossed the Ros River and captured Stavishche. The 16th Panzer Division, which was forced to repel counterattacks of the Soviet 6th Army (37th Rifle Corps and "Berdichev Group" ), advanced slower, but by 17 July its forward detachment seized the Ros' station (c. 65 km from Berdichev), where was an important Soviet base of rear services support. 18 July, units of the 6th army managed to recapture the station.

Further to the North, the XIV Motorized Corps advanced to Belaya Tserkov, but met counterattacks by the 26th Army. This army had no time to prepare the offensive, and its divisions didn't have time to concentrate. They couldn't beat out the 9th Panzer Division from Belaya Tserkov. Nevertheless, they for a short time captured Fastov. The advance of the 26th Army soon stopped, but its attacks contained the mobile units of the 1st Panzer Group. A similar situation was with the Panzer divisions of the III Motorized Corps. Franz Halder, the chief of OKH, irritably wrote on 18 July that "the operation of the Army Group "South" is increasingly losing its shape", and that "enveloping flank of the 1st Panzer Group is still hang about in the area of Berdichev and Belaya Tserkov". At the same time the 17th Field Army from the West was approaching too quickly and Halder feared that the future "cauldron" would not trap significant enemy forces.

Meanwhile, the 17th Field Army tried to implement a shortcut version of the original plan, according to which the Soviet troops were to be surrounded to the west of Vinnytsia. But now Germans had no mobile units to hit Vinnytsia from the North (they operated east of Berdichev), and the offensive of 11th Field Army from the south was postponed. Therefore, from the north to Vinnitsa 24 ID was marching. From the south-west on 17 July the 1st Mountain Division came and took under fire bridges across the Southern Bug river. In case of German success, 50,000 troops from the Soviet 12th army would have been surrounded there. However, the Soviet troops regrouped, and from the Southern Front a fresh mountain rifle division was transferred, so they managed to contain the advance of the German infantry, and by 21 July to retreat through Vinnytsia across the Southern Bug river.

KV-1 tank (1939); there were only 10 such devices in the 2nd Mechanized Corps out of almost 400 tanks, when it got an order to regroup to Uman.

By 18 July, the Soviet command realized that they did not have enough forces to seal the breakthrough of the 1st Panzer Group and restore the defense along the "Stalin Line". Budyonny noted that on the right flank of the Soviet 6th army was a gap of 90 km, which is gradually filled with German troops. As a result, it was decided to withdraw the 6th and 12th army on the line of Belaya Tserkov – Tetiev – Kitay-Gorod – Haisyn (80–100 km East of the line Berdichev – Vinnitsa). The 18th army of the Southern Front, adjacent to the left flank of the 12th army, also received an order to withdraw. The departure was to take place at night and be completed by 21 July. The problem was that the German tanks of the XXXXVIII and XIV Motorized corps had already broken through this line. However, the Soviet command planned to fix this problem by the offensive of three infantry corps, which was to strike South-West from Kiev. In addition, on 18 July the 2nd Mechanized Corps received an order to transfer from Southern Front to Uman, to meet the XXXXVIII Motorized Corps of the Germans. In turn, High Command of the Wehrmacht on 19 July decided to change the Barbarossa plan. Units of the Army Group "Center", instead of attacking Moscow, had to hit the South and North to surround the Soviet troops and prevent their withdrawal. The close task of the Army Group "South" was the encirclement of the 6th and 12th Soviet armies West of the Dnieper. At the same time, on 18 July, Halder and the command of the Army Group "South" decided that the attack on Uman would not be sufficient. At Uman had to go only part of the right flank of the 1st Panzer Group, and the main blow should be directed further to the East, towards Krivoy Rog.

=== Attempts to retreat ===
The second stage of the first offensive of the 26th Army began on 18 July, but also ended in failure. Thanks to the intercepted radio message, the German command knew about it in advance. Because of the north part of the line for retreat remained in the hands of the Germans, the 6th Army began to retreat in the South-Eastern direction, while preparing a counterattack against the German troops flanking it from the North-East. The counterattacks of the 6th and 12th armies near Orativ – Monastyrysche began on 21 July and forced the 16th Motorized and the 16th Panzer divisions to go on the defensive. The Soviet 2nd Mechanized Corps, further to the East, attacked the 11th Panzer Division and stopped its advance to Uman. By stopping the advance of the German strike wedge, Soviet troops were able to continue the retreat, although the gap with the 26th Army remained. Halder was forced to admit: "The enemy again found a way to withdraw his troops from the threat of an emerging encirclement".

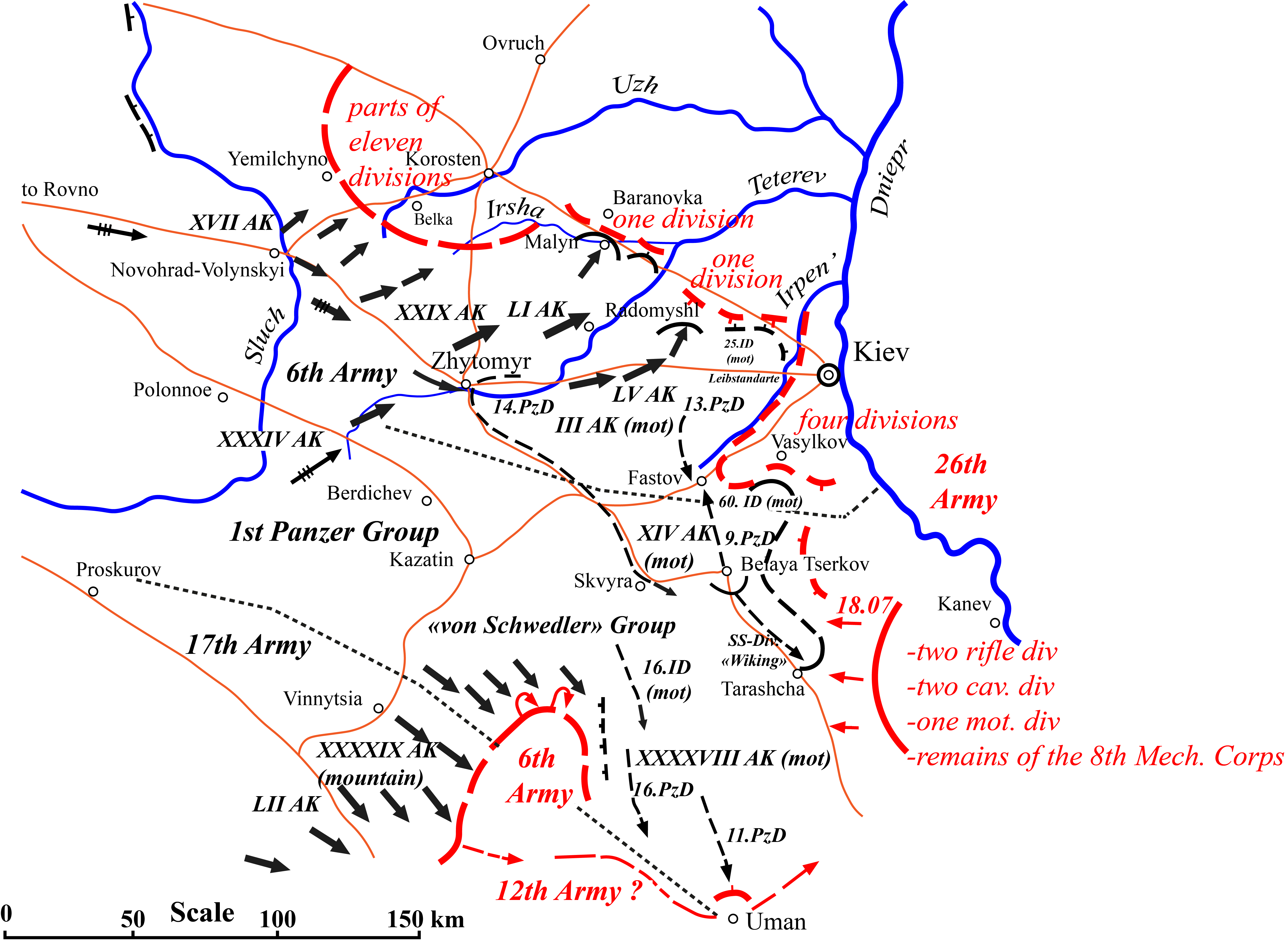
The situation around Kiev on the evening of 21 July 1941 (by the OKH opinion)

The 18th Mechanized Corps, which was in the reserve of the Southern Front, was ordered to advance to Uman on 18 July (along with the 2nd Mechanized Corps). However, it had to be used to close the gap between the 12th and 18th armies, which was formed after the breakthrough of the XXXXIX Mountain Army Corps to Vinnytsia. This breakthrough led the Germans to the rear of the 18th Army of the Southern Front. The actions of the 18th Mechanized Corps covered the flanks of both armies, and allowed the 18th Army to retreat, and its attacks distracted the attention of the XXXXIX Mountain Corps and alleviated a situation with the 12th Army near Vinnytsia.

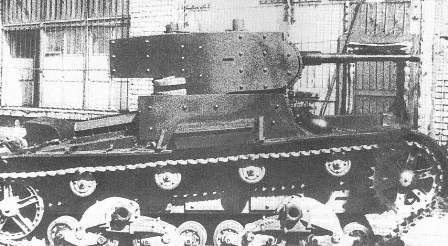
T-26 tank; this light-armored tank was a development of the British Vickers 6-Ton tank and at the summer of 1941 it was the most widespread Soviet tank. The 18th Mechanized Corps had 308 T-26 out of a total of 457 tanks and had no KV-1s or T-34s at all.

By 25 July, the infantry divisions of Army Group "South" had driven to their mobile units and began to replace them. Near Kiev the III Motorized Corps was liberated and began to move to Belaya Tserkov. His arrival finally crashed another attempt by the 26th Army to restore the continuous front line. So, the XIV Motorized Corps was able to continue the offensive in a south-easterly direction. To the north and north-west of Uman, the 16th Motorized and 16th Panzer Divisions were liberated, as well as the motorized "Leibstandarte" brigade. As a result, by July 31 the 16th Motorized Division of the XXXXVIII Corps captured Talnoye and Novoarkhangelsk (~40 km to the East of Uman) and the 9th Panzer Division of the XIV Corps took Ol'shanka (~75 km to the South-East of Uman). Thus, the new line, appointed by the Soviet command for the retreat of the 6th and 12th armies (along the Sin'uha river), was once again pre-occupied by the Germans. However, this time there was nothing to parry the breakthrough, the Soviet reserves were completely exhausted. New divisions and armies, hastily formed by the Soviet command, were east of the Dnieper.

To the west of Uman, the command of the XXXXIX Mountain Corps launched the fresh 125th Infantry Division, which took the town of Gaisin on 25 July. Other parts of the Corps rushed into the breakthrough, and the 1st Mountain Division achieved the greatest success – on 26 July it advanced 70 kilometers to the south-east and found itself in the rear of the Soviet troops. Attempts to restore the situation were not successful. In the fights of 25–27 July, the XXXXIX Mountain Corps defeated the Soviet 18th Mechanized Corps and thus was able to outflank the 12th Army from the south.

On 31 July, the 1st Mountain Division captured Golovanevsk (~45 km south-southeast of Uman). On the same day, the Soviet troops left Uman. The 6th and 12th armies were on the territory around of 40x40 km, surrounded by German troops from all sides except the south. However, the Soviet command still demanded them to attack in a northeast direction and tie-in with the troops of the 26th Army. In fact, the main task of the South-Western Direction was the creation of a line of defense along the Dnieper. The Soviet command mistakenly believed that the Germans would immediately move to the east, to the crossings over the Dnieper, thus the attacks of the 6th and 12th armies from the flank would hamper them. In fact, the destruction of the 6th and 12th armies was the German main task. By 1 August, the German command refused plans to surround immediately the 18th Army of the Southern Front in addition to the 6th and 12th armies, and directed XXXXIX Mountain Corps to the east and northeast of Golovanevsk, along the shortest path to finish the surrounding near Uman.

=== The final stage ===
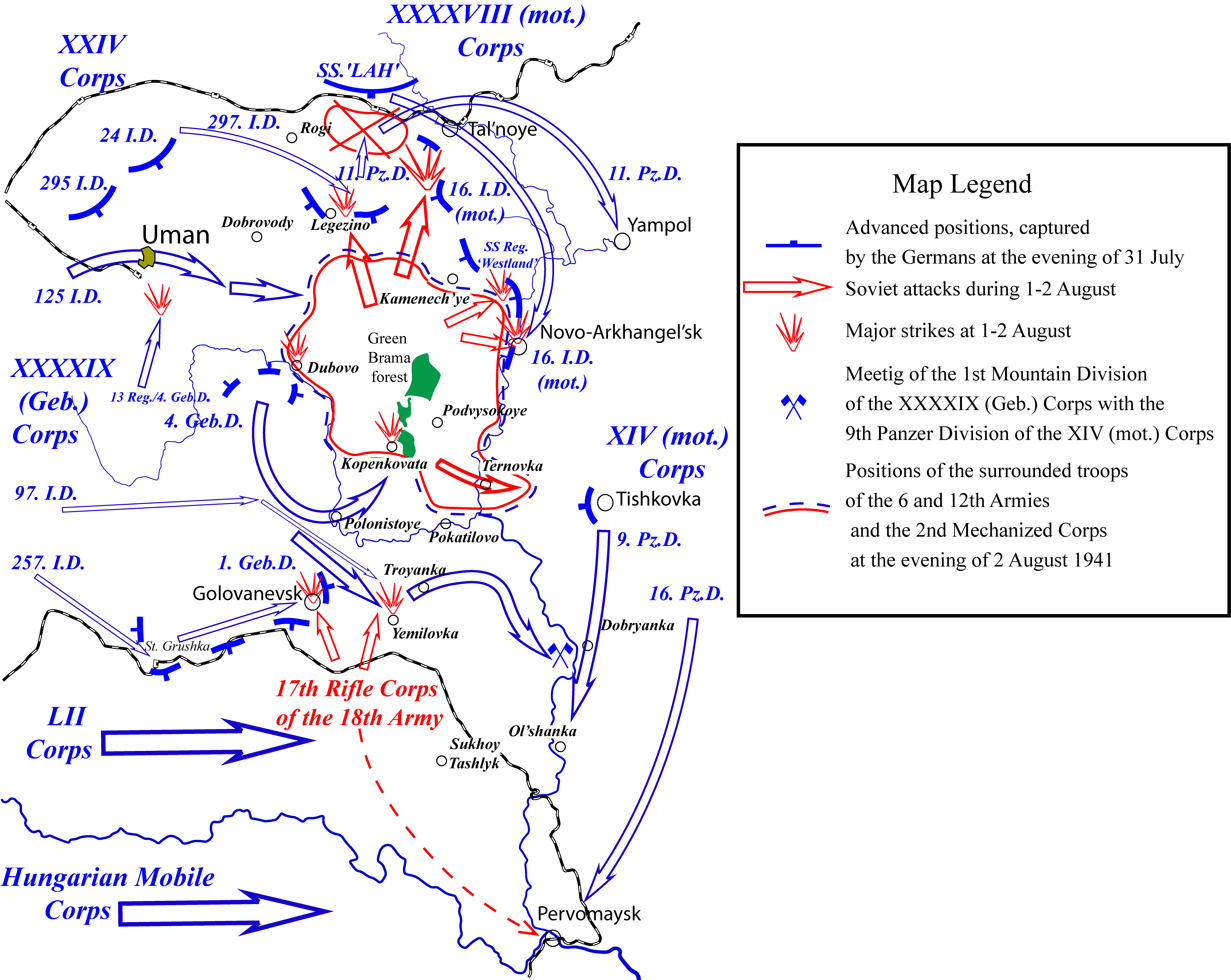
The environment of Soviet troops near Uman, 1–2 August 1941

On the morning of 1 August, the commands of the 6th and 12th armies (from 28 July, the remnants of the 6th and 12th armies and the 2nd Mechanized Corps were combined in Ponedelin Group) sent a joint communication to the command of the Southern Front, with a copy sent to Stalin:

The situation has become critical. The encirclement of the 6th and 12th armies is completed. There is a direct threat of the disintegration of the combined combat order of 6th and 12th armies <...> There are no reserves<...> There is no ammunition, the fuel is running out.

But the commander of the Southern Front, Tyulenev, assured Stalin that the situation would be restored by a blow towards Ponedelin Group of the fresh 223rd Rifle Division from the northeast, and the units of 18th Army from the south, while denying any supply difficulties.

On 1 August, the Soviet 18th Army attempted to join the Ponedelin group from the south. But the divisions on the right flank of the XXXXIX Mountain Corps repelled the attack of the Soviet 17th Rifle Corps, and by evening the 18th Army was attacked by units of the LII Army Corps and Hungarian Mobile Corps. The commander of the 18th Army gave the order to retreat to Pervomaysk. At the same time, the attacks of the XXXXIX Mountain Corps against the Ponedelin group distracted the Soviet units and allowed the 1st Mountain Division to move even further to the east.

The just formed and inexperienced 223rd Rifle Division, while preparing for an attack fell under the sudden blow of the 14th Panzer Division, and was quickly defeated. A breakthrough towards Ponedelin Group from the north-east was foiled. The command of the Southern Front continued to believe that only the "leaked" groups of the enemy are acting in this direction, while the main forces of the 1st Panzer Group have already entered the breakthrough, spreading to the south and southeast.

On 2 August, the units of the 1st Mountain Division reached the Sinyuha River, where they joined the 9th Panzer Division of the XIV Motorized Corps. At this time, other parts of the XXXXVIII and XIV Corps in heavy fighting repulsed all attempts of the Ponedelin Group to break through to the east and north-east. The ring of encirclement was closed, but it was not yet strong. The encirclement was reinforced the next day by a second joining, formed when the German 16th Panzer Division met the Hungarian Mobile Corps in Pervomaysk.

== After the encirclement ==
The command of the encircled Soviet armies well realized the severity of the situation and asked for help, but did not receive it. The troops of the Southern Front retreated, their battle line was broken several times. The troops of the 26th Army were defeated in the battles with the 1st Panzer Group and retreated to the Dnieper. All attempts by the Ponedelin Group to connect with it failed. On the night of 2 August, the commander of the 6th Army Muzychenko asked permission to break out of the encirclement in the southeast direction, towards the 18th Army of the Southern Front. However, the command of the Southern Front repeatedly ordered to move to the east, to the border-line on the Sinyuha River, which was firmly occupied by the troops of the XXXXVIII and XIV Motorized corps. Moreover, further to the east the offensive of the III Motorized Corps was developed. On August 1–5, the Ponedelin Group attacked mainly in this direction and only some parts of the 6th Army moved to the south and southeast, entering into a head-on battle with the XXXXIX Mountain Corps.

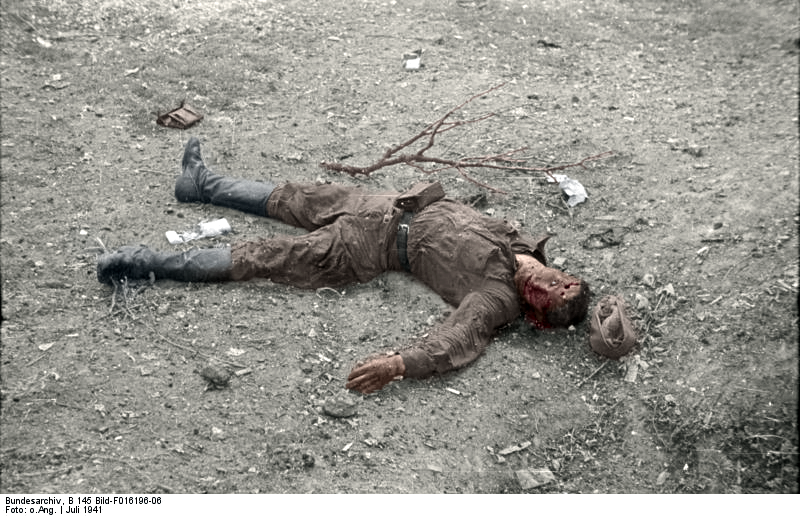
Colorized photo of a Soviet soldier killed in action after the battle of Uman.

On 4 August, German troops, by a blow from both sides, eliminated the bridgehead captured by the Soviet units (General Proshkin's group) on the eastern bank of the Sinyuha River near the village of Ternovka. By the evening of 4 August, the High Soviet Command had virtually lost interest in the fate of the remnants of encircled armies. In his negotiations with the commander of the South-Western Front, Kirponos, Stalin demanded the creation of a powerful defensive line along the Dnieper, and mentioned the fate of the 6th and 12th armies only in response to the question of Kirponos. Formally, on 6 August another Soviet offensive towards Uman from the north-east was planned, but in reality the armies were left to their own. In the south, the right flank of the 18th Army was scattered and partially surrounded near Pervomaysk. By 5 August the territory, which was still held by surrounded Soviet troops (~65,000), was only 10x10 km, and it was totally under the fire.

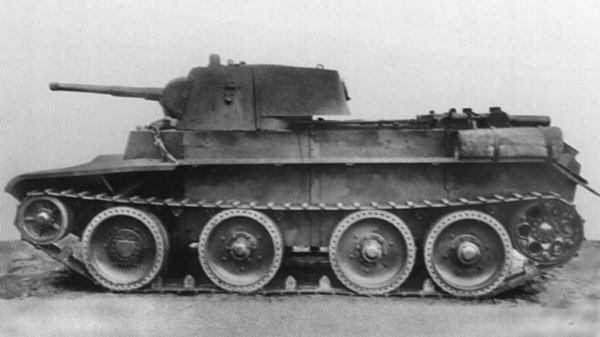
BT-7M; BT tanks, noted by their high speed and thin armor, made up a significant part of the Soviet tank fleet in 1941. Breaking out of the Uman "cauldron", the chief of staff of the 6th Army Ivanov drove 200 km along the German rear on a BT-7M tank.

On the night of 6 August, Soviet troops made a desperate attempt to break out of the encirclement. This time they struck south, assuming that it is enough to break through the positions of the XXXXIX Mountain Corps to connect with the units of the 18th Army to the north of Pervomaysk. In fact, Pervomaysk was lost on 3 August, but the command of the Southern Front did not report this. The command of the 6th Army planned to break out of the encirclement by collecting several last tanks in the "Special Task" column. Detachments of the 1st and 4th Mountain divisions failed to stop the night breakthrough, the Soviet strike forces marched 20 km and even took Golovanevsk. But instead of the Soviet 18th Army, they encountered German troops of the LII Army Corps and 9th Panzer Division and were stopped. In the course of the breakthrough, they suffered heavy losses and by the morning of 7 August were mostly routed, only small groups without heavy weapons managed to exit the encirclement. The "Special Task" column was annihilated and the commander of the 6th Army Muzychenko was taken prisoner.

The next night the breakthrough attempts were repeated. This time parts of the predominantly 12th Army and the 2nd Mechanized Corps broke through to the east and north-east. Partially successful was only a breakthrough in the north-easterly direction, but barely small detachments were able to get out of the encirclement. The commander of the 12th Army, Ponedelin, was taken prisoner after his tank was hit. The commander and commissar of the 2nd Mechanized Corps left the encirclement only a few months later.

On the afternoon of 7 August, Soviet troops surrounded in the forests near the villages Podvysokoye and Kopenkovatoye (including the Green Brama forest) began to surrender. Beside the commanders of both the 6th and 12th armies, four corps commanders, and 11 division commanders were taken prisoners.

== See also ==
- Battle of Kiev

== Bibliography ==
- Crofoot, Craig (2004). Armies of the Bear. Tiger Lily Pubn Llc. ISBN 0-9720-2963-X.
- Isaev, Alexey (2004). От Дубно до Ростова [From Dubno to Rostov] (in Russian). Moscow: AST. p. 710. ISBN 5-17-022744-2.
- Nuzhdin, Oleg (2015). Уманский "котёл": Трагедия 6-й и 12-й армий [Uman "cauldron": The tragedy of the 6th and 12th armies] (in Russian). Moscow: Яуза-каталог. p. 450. ISBN 978-5-906716-41-5.
- Irinarhov (2012). Непростительный 1941: "чистое поражение" Красной Армии [Unforgivable 1941: "clear defeat" of the Red Army] (in Russian). Moscow: Яуза. p. 544. ISBN 978-5-699-55446-1.
