= Boyko Aleksiev =

Bulgarian figure skater (born 1963)

Personal information
- Other names: Boiko Alexiev
- Born: 20 April 1963 (age 63)

Figure skating career
- Country: Bulgaria
- Retired: 1989

Boyko Aleksiev (Bulgarian: Бойко Алексиев, born 20 April 1963) is a Bulgarian former competitive figure skater. He represented Bulgaria at six European Championships, three World Championships, and the 1988 Winter Olympics in Calgary.

== Competitive highlights ==
International
Event	79–80	80–81	81–82	82–83	83–84	84–85	85–86	86–87	87–88	88–89
Olympics									26th	
Worlds							27th	25th		26th
Europeans	20th	20th	23rd				22nd	22nd		20th
National
Bulgarian	1st	1st			1st	1st	1st	1st		
WD = Withdrew
