= Paul Askham =

British ice dancer (born 1962)

Personal information
- Full name: Paul Askham
- Born: 26 October 1962 (age 63) Blackpool, England

Figure skating career
- Country: Great Britain
- Partner: Sharon Jones
- Coach: Joan Slater MBE
- Skating club: Altrincham Ice Dance & Figure Skating Club; Blackpool Ice Figure Skating Club

Paul Askham (born 26 October 1962) is a British former competitive ice dancer. With partner Sharon Jones, he is the 1985–1988 British national champion. They represented Great Britain at the 1988 Winter Olympics.

They later went on to perform as principal skaters with Holiday on Ice and became the World Professional ice dance champions in Jaca, Spain.

Askham has produced and directed shows in the UK, the USA, and the United Arab Emirates.

Askham worked as a coach and the Director of Coaching in Kent Valley Ice Centre in Seattle Washington until his retirement in 2023. Askham is an all round coach and has produced a number of USA solo ice dance champions and medalists, along with free skaters reaching senior USA National Championships.

== Competitive highlights ==
(with Jones)

International
Event	83–84	84–85	85–86	86–87	87–88	88–89
Winter Olympics					13th	
World Championships		15th	13th	13th	12th	9th
European Championships		11th	9th	8th	8th	6th
International de Paris						2nd
NHK Trophy			3rd		5th	
Skate America						4th
St. Ivel / Skate Electric				2nd	2nd	2nd
National
British Championships	3rd	2nd	1st	1st	1st	1st
