= On the Nameless Height (song) =

Song
- Language: Russian
- Recorded: 1963
- Genre: War song
- Length: 3:51
- Composer: Veniamin Basner
- Lyricist: Mikhail Matusovsky

On The Nameless Height (Russian: На безымянной высоте, Na bezymyannoy vysote), also known as Nearby an Unfamilial Settlement (Russian: У незнакомого посёлка, U neznakomogo posyolka) is a Soviet World War II song. The text was written by Mikhail Matusovsky in 1963, with music by Veniamin Basner, and is one of the themes of the war-based movie "Silence" (Russian: Тишина, Tishina), released in 1964. The song is based on true historical events and glorifies three lucky soldiers, surviving out of an eighteen-soldier infantry squad. The height concerned the one located near the Rubezhenka settlement in the Kuybyshevsky District, Kaluga Oblast while the soldiers, mentioned in song, were a part of Soviet 139th infantry division.

== Background ==
In August 1943 the 139th Rifle Division was reinforced with newly arrived draftees-volunteers. Eighteen newly arrived factory workers from Novosibirsk were given a task to stealthily occupy a height behind enemy lines in the vicinity of today's settlement Rubezhonka in Kaluga Oblast. Headed by the Second Lieutenant Yevgeniy Proshin, they were given the deadline to accomplish their mission by September 14. Their call sign was Luna. Upon completion of the task Luna gave a positive SITREP for a successful mission. However, they were spotted soon by a German patrol, which led to their encirclement and elimination. No real evaluation of the mission was recorded. Despite the lyrics which mention three survivors, there were in fact only two: Sergeant Konstantin Vlasov and Private Gerasim Lapin. Their lives were miraculously spared when they were knocked unconscious. Sergeant Vlasov was captured as a prisoner, but was later able to escape to partisans; Private Lapin was found among the dead by the advancing elements of Soviet Armed Forces.

Nikolai Danilenko, Dmitriy Yaruta, Yemelyan Belokonov, Petr Panin, Dmitriy Shliakhov, Roman Zakomoldin, Nikolai Galenkin, Timofei Kasabiyev, Gavriil Vorobyov, Aleksandr Artamonov, Dmitriy Lipovitser, Boris Kigel, Daniil Denisov, Petr Romanov, and Ivan Kulikov were among the soldiers who died while carrying out the mission.

== Translated lyrics ==
Smoke fled from groves beneath the mountain
The sun was setting in the blaze
There has been three of us remaining
Out of the other eighteen guys
How many of them, friends so closest
Left in the darkness they had lain
Nearby some unfamiliar settlement
Atop a height that has no name
Shone like a star the fired missile
When it was falling from the sky
Those who have witnessed it at least once
Will not forget until they die
Will not forget it, not forget it
The fierce attacks that happened there
Nearby some unfamiliar settlement
Atop a height that has no name

The Messerschmidts above us circling
As in broad day, were seen so well
But only stronger friends became we
Under the artillery hell
Through hard times that we knew together
We stayed loyal to our aim
Nearby some unfamiliar settlement
Atop a height that has no name
Still am I dreaming of their faces
Those comrades from the years of war
I see our dugout in three layers
A pine on top that has been scorched
As if right now, I stand beside them
Before the fiery edge again
Nearby some unfamiliar settlement
Atop a height that has no name

== See also ==
- On the Nameless Height a film
