= Sharon Jones (figure skater) =

British ice dancer (born 1964)

Personal information
- Other names: Sharon Jones Baker
- Born: 24 April 1964 (age 62) Manchester, England

Figure skating career
- Country: Great Britain
- Partner: Paul Askham
- Skating club: Altrincham Ice Dance & Figure Skating Club

Sharon Jones (born 24 April 1964) is a British former competitive ice dancer. With partner Paul Askham, she is the 1985–1988 British national champion. They represented Great Britain at the 1988 Winter Olympics, where they placed 13th.

Jones married Stephen (Steve) Baker, a former pair skater who competed at the 1976 World Junior Championships. Their son, Jean-Luc, is the 2014 World Junior ice dancing champion competing with Kaitlin Hawayek for the United States. The couple work as coaches in Seattle. They coached their son during his earlier partnership with Joylyn Yang.

== Competitive highlights ==
(with Askham)

International
Event	83–84	84–85	85–86	86–87	87–88	88–89
Winter Olympics					13th	
World Championships		15th	13th	13th	12th	9th
European Championships		11th	9th	8th	8th	6th
International de Paris						2nd
NHK Trophy			3rd		5th	
Skate America						4th
St. Ivel / Skate Electric				2nd	2nd	2nd
National
British Championships	3rd	2nd	1st	1st	1st	1st
