= Cheryl Peake =

British pair skater (1966–2013)

Personal information
- Full name: Cheryl Amanda McGehee
- Born: Cheryl Amanda Peake; 30 March 1966 West Bromwich, England, United Kingdom
- Died: 12 June 2013 (aged 47) Hollywood, Florida, U.S.
- Height: 5 ft 1 in (155 cm)

Figure skating career
- Country: Great Britain
- Partner: Andrew Naylor
- Retired: 1992

Cheryl Amanda McGehee (née Peake; 30 March 1966 – 12 June 2013) was a British pair skater. With her skating partner, Andrew Naylor, she was a six-time British national champion. The pair finished 12th at the 1988 Winter Olympics. Other notable results for the pair included fifth-place finishes at the European Figure Skating Championships in 1987 and 1989, and a ninth place at the 1987 World Championships.

After retiring from amateur competition in 1992, Peake skated with Dorothy Hamill's "Cinderella... Frozen in Time" tour, from 1992 to 1995; she also appeared in the 1994 TV special. She later worked as a skating coach in the United States and had two sons.

Peake died on 12 June 2013 in Hollywood, Florida.

== Peake and Naylor results ==
International
Event	85–86	86–87	87–88	88–89	89–90	90–91	91–92
Winter Olympics			12th				
World Champ.	12th	9th	12th	11th		13th	
European Champ.	10th	5th	8th	5th	8th	8th	9th
Inter. de Paris						4th	
Skate America		7th	9th			8th	
Skate Canada		8th	4th				
National
British Champ.		1st	1st	1st	1st	1st	1st
