= Andrew Naylor =

British pair skater

Personal information
- Born: 12 August 1965 (age 60) Nottingham, England
- Height: 1.80 m (5 ft 11 in)

Figure skating career
- Country: Great Britain
- Partner: Cheryl Peake; Maxine Hague
- Retired: 1992

Andrew Naylor (born 12 August 1965) is a British former pair skater. With his skating partner, Cheryl Peake, he became a six-time British national champion. The pair finished 12th at the 1988 Winter Olympics in Calgary, Alberta, Canada. Other notable results for the pair included fifth-place finishes at the European Figure Skating Championships in 1987 and 1989, and a ninth place at the 1987 World Championships. Before his partnership with Peake, Naylor competed with Maxine Hague.

== Results ==
=== With Peake ===
International
Event	85–86	86–87	87–88	88–89	89–90	90–91	91–92
Winter Olympics			12th				
World Champ.	12th	9th	12th	11th		13th	
European Champ.	10th	5th	8th	5th	8th	8th	9th
Inter. de Paris						4th	
Skate America		7th	9th			8th	
Skate Canada		8th	4th				
National
British Champ.		1st	1st	1st	1st	1st	1st

=== With Hague ===
National
Event	1984–85
British Championships	3rd

== Post-competitive career ==
Naylor currently coaches at Richard J. Codey Arena. He is also the founder of Edge Skate Shop in West Orange, New Jersey.
