= 1983 European Figure Skating Championships =

Figure skating competition

1983 European Championships
- Type: ISU Championship
- Date: February 1 – 6
- Season: 1982–83
- Location: Dortmund, West Germany
- Venue: Westfalenhallen

Champions
- Men's singles: (West Germany) Norbert Schramm
- Ladies' singles: (East Germany) Katarina Witt
- Pairs: (East Germany) Sabine Baeß / Tassilo Thierbach
- Ice dance: (Soviet Union) Natalia Bestemianova / Andrei Bukin
- Previous: 1982 European Championships
- Next: 1984 European Championships

The 1983 European Figure Skating Championships was a senior-level international competition held in Dortmund, West Germany from February 1 to 6, 1983. Elite skaters from European ISU member nations competed in the disciplines of men's singles, ladies' singles, pair skating, and ice dancing.

== Overview and results ==
The championships cost 1.5 million Deutsche Marks. Compulsory figures were held in Unna and began at 8 a.m. The German Ice Skating Union president Wolf-Dieter Montag, also served as president of the organizing committee.

=== Men ===
Simond won compulsory figures. After the short program, Sabovčík was in first, followed by Schramm and Simond. Schramm would win the title.

Rank	Name	Nation	TFP	CF	SP	FS
1	Norbert Schramm	West Germany	3.8	4	1	1
2	Jozef Sabovčík	Czechoslovakia	7.0	2	2	5
3	Alexander Fadeev	Soviet Union	8.6	5	9	2
4	Heiko Fischer	West Germany	9.4	3	4	6
5	Vladimir Kotin	Soviet Union	9.8	6	8	3
6	Jean-Christophe Simond	France	10.0	1	6	7
7	Rudi Cerne	West Germany	10.2	7	5	4
8	Grzegorz Filipowski	Poland				8
9	Laurent Depouilly	France				
10	Fernand Fédronic	France		8		
11	Lars Åkesson	Sweden				
12	Falko Kirsten	East Germany				
13	Thomas Hlavik	Austria				
14	Miljan Begovic	Yugoslavia				
15	Mark Pepperday	United Kingdom				
16	Richard Furrer	Switzerland				
17	Bruno Delmaestro	Italy				
18	Petr Barna	Czechoslovakia				
19	Todd Sand	Denmark				
20	András Száraz	Hungary				
21	Fernando Soria	Spain				

=== Ladies ===
Rank	Name	Nation	CF	SP	FS
1	Katarina Witt	East Germany	2	1	1
2	Elena Vodorezova	Soviet Union	1		
3	Claudia Leistner	West Germany	9		
4	Manuela Ruben	West Germany	6		
5	Anna Kondrashova	Soviet Union			
6	Kristiina Wegelius	Finland	5		
7	Anna Antonova	Soviet Union			
8	Janina Wirth	East Germany	10		
9	Sonja Stanek	Austria	4		
10	Sanda Dubravčić	Yugoslavia	7		
11	Karin Telser	Italy			
12	Parthena Sarafidis	Austria	8		
13	Sandra Cariboni	Switzerland	3		
14	Karin Hendschke	East Germany			
15	Katrien Pauwels	Belgium			
16	Hana Veselá	Czechoslovakia			
17	Agnès Gosselin	France			
18	Li Scha Wang	Netherlands			
19	Hanne Gamborg	Denmark			
20	Susan Jackson	United Kingdom			
21	Catarina Lindgren	Sweden			
22	Elise Ahonen	Finland			
23	Nora Miklosi	Hungary			
24	Rosario Esteban	Spain			
WD	Karen Wood	United Kingdom			

=== Pairs ===
Baeß / Thierbach repeated as European champions.

Rank	Name	Nation	SP	FS
1	Sabine Baeß / Tassilo Thierbach	East Germany	1	1
2	Elena Valova / Oleg Vasiliev	Soviet Union	4	2
3	Birgit Lorenz / Knut Schubert	East Germany	2	3
4	Veronika Pershina / Marat Akbarov	Soviet Union	3	
5	Marina Avstriskaya / Yuri Kvashnin	Soviet Union	5	
6	Babette Preußler / Torsten Ohlow	East Germany		
7	Claudia Massari / Leonardo Azzola	West Germany	6	
8	Susan Garland / Ian Jenkins	United Kingdom	7	
9	Jana Havlova / René Novotný	Czechoslovakia		
10	Nathalie Tortel / Xavier Douillard	France		
11	Birgit Kuß / Uwe Fischbeck	France		
12	Naija Pekkala / Pekka Pekkala	Finland	8	

=== Ice dancing ===
Rank	Name	Nation
1	Natalia Bestemianova / Andrei Bukin	Soviet Union
2	Olga Volozhinskaya / Alexander Svinin	Soviet Union
3	Karen Barber / Nicholas Slater	United Kingdom
4	Marina Klimova / Sergei Ponomarenko	Soviet Union
5	Nathalie Herve / Pierre Bechu	France
6	Petra Born / Rainer Schönborn	West Germany
7	Wendy Sessions / Stephen Williams	United Kingdom
8	Isabella Micheli / Roberto Pelizzola	Italy
9	Jindra Holá / Karol Foltán	Czechoslovakia
10	Judit Péterfy / Csaba Bálint	Hungary
11	Antonia Becherer / Ferdinand Becherer	West Germany
12	Marianne van Bommel / Wayne Deweyert	Netherlands
