= 1982 European Figure Skating Championships =

Figure skating competition

1982 European Championships
- Type: ISU Championship
- Date: February 2 – 7
- Season: 1981–82
- Location: Lyon, France
- Venue: Palais des Sports de Gerland

Champions
- Men's singles: (West Germany) Norbert Schramm
- Ladies' singles: (Austria) Claudia Kristofics-Binder
- Pairs: (East Germany) Sabine Baeß / Tassilo Thierbach
- Ice dance: (United Kingdom) Jayne Torvill / Christopher Dean
- Previous: 1981 European Championships
- Next: 1983 European Championships

The 1982 European Figure Skating Championships was a senior-level international competition held in Lyon, France, from February 2 to 7, 1982. Elite skaters from European ISU member nations competed in the disciplines of men's singles, ladies' singles, pair skating, and ice dancing.

== Results ==
=== Men ===
Rank	Name	Nation	TFP	CF	OP	FS
1	Norbert Schramm	West Germany	4.2	4	2	1
2	Jean-Christophe Simond	France	5.0	1	6	2
3	Igor Bobrin	Soviet Union	6.2	2	5	3
4	Rudi Cerne	West Germany	11.0		3	
5	Alexander Fadeev	Soviet Union	11.6		4	
6	Heiko Fischer	West Germany	11.6	3		
7	Vladimir Kotin	Soviet Union	12.6	5		
8	Jozef Sabovčík	Czechoslovakia	12.6	7	1	8
9	Grzegorz Filipowski	Poland	15.8			
10	Didier Monge	France	21.2			
11	Philippe Paulet	France	23.2			
12	Thomas Hlavik	Austria	25.8			
13	Oliver Höner	Switzerland				
14	Bruno Delmaestro	Italy				
15	Miljan Begovic	Yugoslavia				
16	Mark Pepperday	United Kingdom				
17	Lars Åkesson	Sweden				
18	Ed van Campen	Netherlands				
19	Todd Sand	Denmark		18		
20	Thierry Michels	Luxembourg				
21	András Száraz	Hungary				
22	Eric Krol	Belgium				
23	Boyko Aleksiev	Bulgaria				
24	Fernando Soria	Spain				
WD	Alexander König	East Germany				

=== Ladies ===
Witt was 6th in the compulsory figures and first in the technical program and free skating. Kristofics-Binder won the figures and was third in the technical and the free, with Leistner second in the free.

Rank	Name	Nation	TFP	CF	OP	FS
1	Claudia Kristofics-Binder	Austria	4.8	1	3	3
2	Katarina Witt	East Germany	5.0	6	1	1
3	Elena Vodorezova	Soviet Union				
4	Deborah Cottrill	United Kingdom				
5	Claudia Leistner	West Germany				2
6	Kristiina Wegelius	Finland				
7	Carola Paul	East Germany				
8	Karen Wood	United Kingdom				
9	Janina Wirth	East Germany				
10	Anna Antonova	Soviet Union				
11	Myriam Oberwiler	Switzerland				
12	Hana Veselá	Czechoslovakia				
13	Sandra Cariboni	Switzerland				
14	Manuela Ruben	West Germany				
15	Sonja Stanek	Austria				
16	Parthena Sarafidis	Austria				
17	Pairi Nieminen	Finland				
18	Karin Telser	Italy				
19	Béatrice Farinacci	France				
20	Liisa Seitsonen	Finland				
21	Katrien Pauwels	Belgium				
22	Catarina Lindgren	Sweden				
23	Anette Nygaard	Denmark				
24	Nevenka Lisak	Yugoslavia				
25	Rosario Esteban	Spain				
26	Nora Miklosi	Hungary				
27	Ingrid Aalders	Netherlands				
28	Tsvetanka Stefanova	Bulgaria				
WD	Sanda Dubravčić	Yugoslavia				
WD	Petra Malivuk	Yugoslavia				

=== Pairs ===
This was the first Europeans in 17 years that was not won by a pair from the Soviet Union. Vorobieva & Lisovsky won the short program over Baess & Thierbach.

Rank	Name	Nation
1	Sabine Baeß / Tassilo Thierbach	East Germany
2	Marina Pestova / Stanislav Leonovich	Soviet Union
3	Irina Vorobieva / Igor Lisovski	Soviet Union
4	Veronika Pershina / Marat Akbarov	Soviet Union
5	Birgit Lorenz / Knut Schubert	East Germany
6	Susan Garland / Ian Jenkins	United Kingdom
7	Bettina Hage / Stefan Zins	West Germany
8	Nathalie Tortel / Xavier Videau	France
9	Gaby Galambos / Jürg Galambos	Switzerland

=== Ice dancing ===
Rank	Name	Nation
1	Jayne Torvill / Christopher Dean	United Kingdom
2	Natalia Bestemianova / Andrei Bukin	Soviet Union
3	Irina Moiseeva / Andrei Minenkov	Soviet Union
4	Olga Volozhinskaya / Alexander Svinin	Soviet Union
5	Karen Barber / Nicholas Slater	United Kingdom
6	Nathalie Hervé / Pierre Béchu	France
7	Jana Beránková / Jan Barták	Czechoslovakia
8	Judit Péterfy / Csaba Bálint	Hungary
9	Wendy Sessions / Stephen Williams	United Kingdom
10	Birgit Goller / Peter Klisch	West Germany
11	Petra Born / Rainer Schönborn	West Germany
12	Jindra Holá / Karol Foltán	Czechoslovakia
13	Isabella Micheli / Roberto Pelizzola	Italy
14	Maria Kniffer / Manfred Hubler	Austria
15	Marianne van Bommel / Wayne Deweyert	Netherlands
16	Martine Olivier / Philippe Boissier	France
17	Esther Guiglia / Roland Mader	Switzerland
18	Salia Saarinen / Kim Jacobson	Finland
19	Ulla Ornamerker / Thomas Svedberg	Sweden
