= 1984 European Figure Skating Championships =

Figure skating competition

1984 European Championships
- Type: ISU Championship
- Season: 1983–84
- Location: Budapest, Hungary

Champions
- Men's singles: (Soviet Union) Alexander Fadeev
- Ladies' singles: (East Germany) Katarina Witt
- Pairs: (Soviet Union) Elena Valova / Oleg Vasiliev
- Ice dance: (United Kingdom) Jayne Torvill / Christopher Dean
- Previous: 1983 European Championships
- Next: 1985 European Championships

The 1984 European Figure Skating Championships was a senior-level international competition held in Budapest, Hungary from January 11 to 15, 1984. Elite skaters from European ISU member nations competed in the disciplines of men's singles, ladies' singles, pair skating, and ice dancing.

== Results ==
=== Men ===
Rank	Name	Nation	TFP	CF	SP	FS
1	Alexander Fadeev	Soviet Union	3.8	4	1	1
2	Rudi Cerne	West Germany	5.0	3	3	2
3	Norbert Schramm	West Germany	7.4	6	2	3
4	Jozef Sabovčík	Czechoslovakia	8.2	2	5	5
5	Heiko Fischer	West Germany	10.6	5	4	6
6	Vladimir Kotin	Soviet Union	11.0	7	7	4
7	Vitali Egorov	Soviet Union	17.2			
8	Grzegorz Filipowski	Poland	17.4			
9	Falko Kirsten	East Germany	19.0			
10	Petr Barna	Czechoslovakia	21.2			
11	Laurent Depouilly	France	21.4			
12	Thomas Hlavik	Austria	26.8			
13	Lars Åkesson	Sweden	27.4			
14	Miljan Begovic	Yugoslavia	28.0			
15	Paul Robinson	United Kingdom	30.8			
16	Oliver Höner	Switzerland	30.8			
17	Wojciech Gwinner	Poland	36.0			
18	András Száraz	Hungary	36.0			
19	Lars Dresler	Denmark	39.4			
20	Ed van Campen	Netherlands	40.6			
21	Fernando Soria	Spain	43.0			
WD	Jean-Christophe Simond	France		1	6	

=== Ladies ===
Rank	Name	Nation
1	Katarina Witt	East Germany
2	Manuela Ruben	West Germany
3	Anna Kondrashova	Soviet Union
4	Kira Ivanova	Soviet Union
5	Sanda Dubravčić	Yugoslavia
6	Sandra Cariboni	Switzerland
7	Simone Koch	East Germany
8	Karin Telser	Italy
9	Agnès Gosselin	France
10	Cornelia Tesch	West Germany
11	Parthena Sarafidis	Austria
12	Karin Hendschke	East Germany
13	Katrien Pauwels	Belgium
14	Susan Jackson	United Kingdom
15	Elise Ahonen	Finland
16	Susanna Peltola	Finland
17	Susanne Gschwend	Austria
18	Tamara Téglássy	Hungary
19	Nevenka Lisak	Yugoslavia
20	Anette Nygaard	Denmark
21	Marta Cierco	Spain
WD	Elena Vodorezova	Soviet Union

=== Pairs ===
Rank	Name	Nation	TFP	SP	FS
1	Elena Valova / Oleg Vasiliev	Soviet Union	1.4	1	1
2	Sabine Baeß / Tassilo Thierbach	East Germany	2.8	2	2
3	Birgit Lorenz / Knut Schubert	East Germany	4.2	3	3
4	Larisa Selezneva / Oleg Makarov	Soviet Union	5.6	4	4
5	Marina Avstriskaya / Yuri Kvashnin	Soviet Union	7.0	5	5
6	Babette Preußler / Tobias Schröter	East Germany	8.4	6	6
7	Dagmar Kovarova / Jozef Komar	Czechoslovakia	10.2	8	7
8	Claudia Massari / Leonardo Azzola	West Germany	10.8	7	8
9	Susan Garland / Ian Jenkins	United Kingdom	12.6	9	9
10	Gaby Galambos / Jürg Galambos	Switzerland	14.0	10	10
11	Sylvie Vacquero / Didier Manaud	France	15.4	11	11

=== Ice dancing ===
Rank	Name	Nation
1	Jayne Torvill / Christopher Dean	United Kingdom
2	Natalia Bestemianova / Andrei Bukin	Soviet Union
3	Marina Klimova / Sergei Ponomarenko	Soviet Union
4	Karen Barber / Nicholas Slater	United Kingdom
5	Olga Volozhinskaya / Alexander Svinin	Soviet Union
6	Petra Born / Rainer Schönborn	West Germany
7	Wendy Sessions / Stephen Williams	United Kingdom
8	Nathalie Herve / Pierre Bechu	France
9	Jindra Holá / Karol Foltán	Czechoslovakia
10	Isabella Micheli / Roberto Pelizzola	Italy
11	Marianne van Bommel / Wayne Deweyert	Netherlands
12	Antonia Becherer / Ferdinand Becherer	West Germany
13	Graziella Ferpozzi / Marco Ferpozzi	Switzerland
14	Viera Mináríková / Ivan Havránek	Czechoslovakia
15	Gabriella Remport / Sándor Nagy	Hungary
16	Kathrin Beck / Christoff Beck	Austria
17	Klára Engi / Attila Tóth	Hungary
18	Bożena Wierzchowska / Robert Kazanowski	Poland
19	Sophie Merigot / Philippe Berthe	France
20	Brunhilde Bianchi / Walter Rizzo	Italy
21	Christina Boianova / Yavor Ivanov	Bulgaria
