= 1981 European Figure Skating Championships =

Figure skating competition

- Type: ISU Championship
- Date: February 3 – 8
- Season: 1981
- Location: Innsbruck, Austria
- Venue: Olympia Hall

Champions
- Men's singles: (Soviet Union) Igor Bobrin
- Ladies' singles: (Switzerland) Denise Biellmann
- Pairs: (Soviet Union) Irina Vorobieva / Igor Lisovski
- Ice dance: (United Kingdom) Jayne Torvill / Christopher Dean
- Previous: 1980 European Championships
- Next: 1982 European Championships

The 1981 European Figure Skating Championships was a senior-level international competition held at the Olympia Hall in Innsbruck, Austria from February 3 to 8, 1981. Figure skaters competed for the title of European Champion in the disciplines of men's singles, ladies' singles, pair skating, and ice dancing.

== Results ==
=== Men ===
Rank	Name	Nation	TFP	CF	SP	FS
1	Igor Bobrin	Soviet Union	3.8	2	4	1
2	Jean-Christophe Simond	France	6.0	3	3	3
3	Norbert Schramm	West Germany	6.6	7	1	2
4	Hermann Schulz	East Germany	6.6	1	5	4
5	Jozef Sabovčík	Czechoslovakia	10.6			
6	Vladimir Kotin	Soviet Union	11.8			
7	Grzegorz Filipowski	Poland	15.2			
8	Falko Kirsten	East Germany	16.0			
9	Alexander Fadeev	Soviet Union	17.2			
10	Patrice Macrez	France	19.6			
11	Christopher Howarth	United Kingdom	24.2			
12	Thomas Öberg	Sweden	24.4			
13	Lars Åkesson	Sweden	26.6			
14	Mark Pepperday	United Kingdom	27.8			
15	Bruno Watschinger	Austria	28.2			
16	Richard Furrer	Switzerland	30.2			
17	Ivan Králik	Czechoslovakia	34.4			
18	Bruno Delmaestro	Italy	35.4			
19	Miljan Begovic	Yugoslavia	35.4			
20	Boyko Aleksiev	Bulgaria	40.0			
21	Jose Antonio Rodrigo	Spain	42.0			

Panel of judges:

- Mary Groombridge United Kingdom
- Tatiana Danilenko Soviet Union
- Walburga Grimm East Germany
- Gerhardt Bubnik Czechoslovakia
- Walter Hüttner Austria
- Marianne Huguenin Sweden
- Alain Calmat France
- Maria Zuchowicz Poland
- Björn Elwin Sweden

Substitute judge:

- Heinz Müllenbach West Germany

=== Ladies ===
Rank	Name	Nation	CP	SP	FS	SP+FS	Points	Total
1	Denise Biellmann	Switzerland	4	1	1	1		3.8
2	Sanda Dubravčić	Yugoslavia	5	2	2	2		5.8
3	Claudia Kristofics-Binder	Austria	1	7	4	5		7.4
4	Kristiina Wegelius	Finland	3	4	5	4		8.4
5	Katarina Witt	East Germany	8	6	3	3		10.2
6	Deborah Cottrill	United Kingdom	2	3	8	7		10.4
7	Kira Ivanova	Soviet Union	6	5	6	6		11.6
8	Karin Riediger	West Germany	7	8	7	8		14.4
9	Carola Paul	East Germany	9	9	10	9		19.0
10	Manuela Ruben	West Germany	11	13	9	10		20.8
11	Karen Wood	United Kingdom	10	16	11	13		23.4
12	Anita Siegfried	Switzerland	13	10	13	12		24.8
13	Karin Telser	Italy	14	11	14	14		26.6
14	Pairi Nieminen	Finland	20	12	11	11		28.8
15	Rudina Pasveer	Netherlands	15	15	15	15		30.0
16	Catarina Lindgren	Sweden	19	14	16	16		33.0
17	Franca Bianconi	Italy	18	17	17	17		34.6
18	Editha Dotson	Belgium	17	20	18	18		36.2
19	Petra Malivuk	Yugoslavia	16	21	21	21		39.0
20	Beata Nachrzter	Poland	22	18	19	19		39.4
21	Nevenka Lisak	Yugoslavia	21	19	20	20		40.2
22	Tsvetanka Stefanova	Bulgaria	23	24	22	22		45.4
23	Rosario Esteban	Spain	24	23	23	23		46.6
WD	Béatrice Farinacci	France	12	22				

- Referee: Sonia Bianchetti Italy
- Assistant Referee: Elemér Terták Hungary

Panel of judges:

- Pamela Davis United Kingdom
- Ludwig Gassner Austria
- Ingrid Linke East Germany
- Liudmila Kubashevskaia Soviet Union
- Elsbeth Bon Netherlands
- Eva von Gamm West Germany
- Radovan Lipovšćak Yugoslavia
- Giovanni De Mori Italy
- Leena Vainio Finland

Substitute judge:

- Jürg Wilhelm Switzerland

=== Pairs ===
Rank	Name	Nation	Places
1	Irina Vorobieva / Igor Lisovski	Soviet Union	1.4
2	Christina Riegel / Andreas Nischwitz	West Germany	3.2
3	Marina Cherkasova / Sergei Shakhrai	Soviet Union	3.8
4	Birgit Lorenz / Knut Schubert	East Germany	6.0
5	Veronika Pershina / Marat Akbarov	Soviet Union	6.6
6	Susan Garland / Robert Daw	United Kingdom	8.4

Panel of judges:

- Monique Petis France
- Jürg Wilhelm Switzerland
- Pamela Davis United Kingdom
- Günter Teichmann East Germany
- Eva von Gamm West Germany
- Władysław Kołodziej Poland
- Liudmila Kubashevskaia Soviet Union
- Pál Vásárhelyi Hungary
- Luciana Brasa Italy

Substitute judge:

- Bojan Lipovscak Yugoslavia

=== Ice dancing ===
Rank	Name	Nation	CD	FS	Total
1	Jayne Torvill / Christopher Dean	United Kingdom	1	1	2
2	Irina Moiseeva / Andrei Minenkov	Soviet Union	2	2	4
3	Natalia Linichuk / Gennadi Karponosov	Soviet Union	3	3	6
4	Natalia Bestemianova / Andrei Bukin	Soviet Union	4	4	8
5	Karen Barber / Nicholas Slater	United Kingdom	5	5	10
6	Nathalie Herve / Pierre Bechu	France	6	6	12
7	Jana Beránková / Jan Barták	Czechoslovakia	7	7	14
8	Birgit Goller / Peter Klisch	West Germany	8	8	16
9	Wendy Sessions / Stephen Williams	United Kingdom	9	9	18
10	Judit Péterfy / Csaba Bálint	Hungary	10	10	20
11	Elisabetta Parisi / Roberto Pelizzola	Italy	11	11	22
12	Gabriella Remport / Sándor Nagy	Hungary	12	12	24
13	Jindra Holá / Karol Foltán	Czechoslovakia	13	13	26
14	Maria Kniffer / Manfed Hübler	Austria	14	14	28
15	Regula Lattmann / Hanspeter Müller	Switzerland	15	15	30
16	Petra Born / Rainer Schönborn	West Germany	16	16	32
17	Marianne von Bommel / Wayne Deweyert	Netherlands	17	17	34
18	Iwona Bielas / Jacek Jasiaczek	Poland	18	18	36
19	Ulla Örnmarker / Thomas Svedberg	Sweden	19	19	38

- Referee: Hans Kutschera Austria
- Assistant Referee: Lawrence Demmy United Kingdom

Panel of judges:

- Marie-Danielle Wilhelm Switzerland
- Armelle van Eybergen France
- Gerhardt Bubnik Czechoslovakia
- Heinz Müllenbach West Germany
- Roy Mason United Kingdom
- Ennio Bernazzali Italy
- Rolf Zorn Austria
- István Sugár Hungary
- Igor Kubanov Soviet Union

Substitute judge:

- Maria Zuchowicz Poland
