= 1981 World Figure Skating Championships =

Annual figure skating competition held in 1981

- Type: ISU Championship
- Date: March 3 – 8
- Season: 1980–81
- Location: Hartford, USA
- Venue: Hartford Civic Center

Champions
- Men's singles: (United States) Scott Hamilton
- Ladies' singles: (Switzerland) Denise Biellmann
- Pairs: (Soviet Union) Irina Vorobieva / Igor Lisovski
- Ice dance: (United Kingdom) Jayne Torvill / Christopher Dean
- Previous: 1980 World Championships
- Next: 1982 World Championships

The 1981 World Figure Skating Championships was the 71st edition of World Figure Skating Championship, held in Hartford, Connecticut, United States from March 3 to 8. At the event, sanctioned by the International Skating Union, medals were awarded in men's singles, ladies' singles, pair skating, and ice dancing.

The ISU Representative was Olaf Poulsen and the ISU Technical Delegate was Josef Dědič.

The judging system was modified since 1980. For the singles events, the short program was worth 20% and the free skating 50% while the value of compulsory figures was reduced to 30% of the final result. The rank in each category was multiplied with a factor and these three numbers were added to the total score. The factor for the compulsory figures was 0.6, for the short program 0.4 and for the free skating 1.0. The rank within these three categories were judged according to the 6.0-judging system. In pairs, the short program had the factor 0.4 and the free skating 1.0. The ranks within the two pair categories were also judged according to the 6.0-judging system.

== Medal tables ==
=== Medalists ===
Discipline	Gold	Silver	Bronze
Men	(United States) Scott Hamilton	(United States) David Santee	(Soviet Union) Igor Bobrin
Ladies	(Switzerland) Denise Biellmann	(United States) Elaine Zayak	(Austria) Claudia Kristofics-Binder
Pair skating	(Soviet Union) Irina Vorobeva / Igor Lisovski	(East Germany) Sabine Baeß / Tassilo Thierbach	(West Germany) Christina Riegel / Andreas Nischwitz
Ice dancing	(United Kingdom) Jayne Torvill / Christopher Dean	(Soviet Union) Irina Moiseeva / Andrei Minenkov	(Soviet Union) Natalia Bestemianova / Andrei Bukin

=== Medals by country ===
Rank	Nation	Gold	Silver	Bronze	Total
1	United States (USA)	1	2	0	3
2	Soviet Union (URS)	1	1	2	4
3	Great Britain (GBR)	1	0	0	1
3	Switzerland (SUI)	1	0	0	1
5	East Germany (GDR)	0	1	0	1
6	Austria (AUT)	0	0	1	1
6	West Germany (FRG)	0	0	1	1
Totals (7 entries)		4	4	4	12

== Results ==
=== Men ===
Rank	Name	Nation	CP	SP	FS	SP+FS	Points	Total
1	Scott Hamilton	United States	4	1	1	1		3.8
2	David Santee	United States	2	3	3	3		5.4
3	Igor Bobrin	Soviet Union	5	4	2	2		6.6
4	Fumio Igarashi	Japan	6	2	4	4		8.4
5	Jean-Christophe Simond	France	1	5	6	6		8.6
6	Brian Orser	Canada	9	6	5	5		12.8
7	Norbert Schramm	West Germany	7	7	7	7		14.0
8	Brian Pockar	Canada	3	8	11	10		16.0
9	Vladimir Kotin	Soviet Union	10	10	10	9		20.0
10	Robert Wagenhoffer	United States	14	12	8	8		21.2
11	Grzegorz Filipowski	Poland	8	11	12	12		21.2
12	Jozef Sabovčík	Czechoslovakia	11	9	13	13		23.2
13	Falko Kirsten	East Germany	15	14	9	11		23.6
14	Thomas Öberg	Sweden	12	13	14	14		26.4
15	Takashi Mura	Japan	17	15	15	15		31.2
16	Bruno Watschinger	Austria	13	16	17	17		31.2
17	Christopher Howarth	United Kingdom	18	18	16	16		34.0
18	Michael Pasfield	Australia	19	17	18	18		36.2
19	Todd Sand	Denmark	20	19	19	19		38.6
20	Xu Zhaoxiao	China	21	20	20	20		40.6
WD	Miljan Begovic	Yugoslavia	16					

Referee:

- Donald H. Gilchrist Canada

Assistant Referee:

- Elemér Terták Hungary

Judges:

- Walburga Grimm East Germany
- Junko Hiramatsu Japan
- Monique Georgelin France
- Gerhard Frey West Germany
- Maria Zuchowicz Poland
- Sergei Kononykhin Soviet Union
- Linda Petersen Denmark
- Hugh C. Graham jr. United States
- Geoffrey Yates United Kingdom

Substitute judge:

- Bojan Lipovšćak Canada

=== Ladies ===
Rank	Name	Nation	CP	SP	FS	SP+FS	Points	Total
1	Denise Biellmann	Switzerland	4	2	1	1		4.2
2	Elaine Zayak	United States	7	3	2	2		7.4
3	Claudia Kristofics-Binder	Austria	1	6	5	5		8.0
4	Deborah Cottrill	United Kingdom	2	8	4	4		8.4
5	Katarina Witt	East Germany	11	1	3	3		10.0
6	Kristiina Wegelius	Finland	3	5	7	7		10.8
7	Priscilla Hill	United States	5	10	9	8		16.0
8	Carola Paul	East Germany	16	7	6	6		18.4
9	Karin Riediger	West Germany	9	14	8	9		19.0
10	Tracey Wainman	Canada	6	15	10	12		19.6
11	Sanda Dubravčić	Yugoslavia	8	12	12	13		21.6
12	Kira Ivanova	Soviet Union	13	4	13	11		22.4
13	Manuela Ruben	West Germany	17	9	11	10		24.8
14	Anne-Sophie de Kristoffy	France	15	11	16	15		29.4
15	Karen Wood	United Kingdom	18	16	14	14		31.2
16	Andrea Rohm	Austria	14	18	17	17		32.6
17	Reiko Kobayashi	Japan	10	13	22	19		33.2
18	Catarina Lindgren	Sweden	19	20	15	16		34.4
19	Corinne Wyrsch	Switzerland	20	22	18	18		38.8
20	Sonja Stanek	Austria	12	19	24	23		38.8
21	Masako Kato	Japan	21	23	19	21		40.8
22	Editha Dotson	Belgium	23	17	21	20		41.6
23	Päivi Nieminen	Finland	25	21	20	22		43.4
24	Vicki Holland	Australia	26	26	23	24		49.0
25	Rudina Pasveer	Netherlands	22	27	26	26		50.0
26	Lisa Coppola	Italy	27	24	25	25		50.8
27	Hanne Gamborg	Denmark	24	25	27	27		51.4
28	Lim Hye-kyung	South Korea	28	28	28	28		56.0
29	Rosario Esteban	Spain	30	31	29	29		59.4
30	Denyse Adam	New Zealand	29	30	30	30		59.4
31	Bao Zhenghua	China	31	29	31	31		61.2

Referee:

- Sonia Bianchetti Italy

Assistant Referee:

- Charles U. Foster United States

Judges:

- Tjaša Andrée Yugoslavia
- Ludwig Gassner Austria
- Karl-David Runeskog Sweden
- Jane Sullivan United States
- Kuniko Ueno Japan
- Helga von Wiecki East Germany
- Marie Lundmark Finland
- Eugen Romminger West Germany
- David Dore Canada

Substitute judge:

- Pamela Davis United Kingdom

=== Pairs ===
Rank	Name	Nation	SP	FS	Points	Total
1	Irina Vorobieva / Igor Lisovski	Soviet Union	1	1		1.4
2	Sabine Baeß / Tassilo Thierbach	East Germany	2	2		2.8
3	Christina Riegel / Andreas Nischwitz	West Germany	4	3		4.6
4	Marina Cherkasova / Sergei Shakhrai	Soviet Union	3	4		5.2
5	Kitty Carruthers / Peter Carruthers	United States	7	5		7.8
6	Veronika Pershina / Marat Akbarov	Soviet Union	5	6		8.0
7	Barbara Underhill / Paul Martini	Canada	10	7		11.0
8	Susan Garland / Robert Daw	United Kingdom	8	8		11.2
9	Birgit Lorenz / Knut Schubert	East Germany	6	9		11.4
10	Lea Ann Miller / William Fauver	United States	9	10		13.6
11	Luan Bo / Yao Bin	China	11	11		15.4

Referee:

- Benjamin T. Wright United States

Assistant Referee:

- Martin Felsenreich Austria

Judges:

- Maya Reinhart Switzerland
- Jacqueline Kendall-Baker Australia
- Walburga Grimm East Germany
- Dorothy MacLeod Canada
- Pamela Davis United Kingdom
- Liudmila Kubashevskaya Soviet Union
- Maria Zuchowicz Poland
- E. Newbold Black IV. United States
- Eugen Romminger West Germany

Substitute judge:

- Junko Hiramatsu Japan

=== Ice dancing ===
Rank	Name	Nation	CD	FD	Total
1	Jayne Torvill / Christopher Dean	United Kingdom	1	1	2
2	Irina Moiseeva / Andrei Minenkov	Soviet Union	2	2	4
3	Natalia Bestemianova / Andrei Bukin	Soviet Union	4	3	7
4	Judy Blumberg / Michael Seibert	United States	3	4	7
5	Olga Volozhinskaya / Alexander Svinin	Soviet Union	6	5	11
6	Carol Fox / Richard Dalley	United States	5	6	11
7	Karen Barber / Nicholas Slater	United Kingdom	7	7	14
8	Nathalie Hervé / Pierre Béchu	France	9	8	17
9	Jana Berankova / Jan Bartak	Czechoslovakia	8	9	17
10	Birgit Goller / Peter Klisch	West Germany	10	10	20
11	Wendy Sessions / Stephen Williams	United Kingdom	11	11	22
12	Kelly Johnson / Kris Barber	Canada	13	12	25
13	Marie McNeil / Robert McCall	Canada	12	13	25
14	Judit Péterfy / Csaba Bálint	Hungary	14	14	28
15	Elisabetta Parisi / Roberto Pelizzola	Italy	15	15	30
16	Noriko Sato / Tadayuki Takahashi	Japan	17	16	33
17	Gabriella Remport / Sándor Nagy	Hungary	16	17	33
18	Maria Kniffer / Manfed Hübler	Austria	19	18	37
19	Karen Mankovich / Douglas Mankovich	Belgium	18	21	39
20	Marianne van Bommel / Wayne Deweyert	Netherlands	21	19	40
21	Petra Born / Rainer Schönborn	West Germany	20	20	40

== Sources ==
- Result list provided by the ISU
