= Figure skating at the 1984 Winter Olympics =

Figure skating at the XIV Winter Olympics
- Type: Olympic Games

Champions
- Men's singles: (United States) Scott Hamilton
- Ladies' singles: (East Germany) Katarina Witt
- Pairs: (Soviet Union) Elena Valova / Oleg Vassiliev
- Ice dance: (United Kingdom) Jayne Torvill / Christopher Dean
- Previous: 1980 Winter Olympics
- Next: 1988 Winter Olympics

Figure skating at the 1984 Winter Olympics took place at the Zetra Olympic Hall in Sarajevo, Yugoslavia. Jayne Torvill and Christopher Dean won gold in ice dance for Great Britain, receiving twelve perfect scores (6.0; a maximum nine of them for artistic impression, the others in the technical merit mark) in the free dance segment of the ice dance competition, a feat that was never matched. They received the most maximum 6.0 marks of any figure skaters at the Olympics.

== Medal table ==
Rank	Nation	Gold	Silver	Bronze	Total
1	United States	1	2	0	3
2	Soviet Union	1	1	3	5
3	East Germany	1	0	0	1
3	Great Britain	1	0	0	1
5	Canada	0	1	0	1
6	Czechoslovakia	0	0	1	1
Totals (6 entries)		4	4	4	12

== Participating NOCs ==
Twenty-one nations sent figure skaters to compete in the events at Sarajevo.

- Australia
- Belgium
- Bulgaria
- Canada
- China
- Czechoslovakia
- East Germany
- France
- Great Britain
- Hungary
- Italy
- Japan
- Poland
- South Korea
- Soviet Union
- Spain
- Sweden
- Switzerland
- United States
- West Germany
- Yugoslavia

== Results ==
=== Men ===
Rank	Name	Nation	CF	SP	FS	TFP
1	Scott Hamilton	United States	1	2	2	3.4
2	Brian Orser	Canada	7	1	1	5.6
3	Jozef Sabovčík	Czechoslovakia	4	5	3	7.4
4	Rudi Cerne	West Germany	3	6	4	8.2
5	Brian Boitano	United States	8	3	5	11.0
6	Jean-Christophe Simond	France	2	4	9	11.8
7	Alexander Fadeev	Soviet Union	5	8	7	13.2
8	Vladimir Kotin	Soviet Union	11	9	6	16.2
9	Norbert Schramm	West Germany	9	7	8	16.2
10	Heiko Fischer	West Germany	6	10	12	19.6
11	Gary Beacom	Canada	10	11	11	21.4
12	Grzegorz Filipowski	Poland	12	12	15	27.0
13	Mark Cockerell	United States	18	17	10	27.6
14	Masaru Ogawa	Japan	16	14	14	29.2
15	Laurent Depouilly	France	14	13	16	29.6
16	Falko Kirsten	East Germany	15	21	13	30.4
17	Lars Åkesson	Sweden	13	15	18	31.8
18	Xu Zhaoxiao	China	22	18	17	37.4
19	Cameron Medhurst	Australia	19	16	20	37.8
20	Jaimee Eggleton	Canada	20	19	19	38.6
21	Miljan Begovic	Yugoslavia	17	22	21	40.0
22	Paul Robinson	Great Britain	21	20	22	42.6
23	Cho Jae-hyung	South Korea	23	23	23	46.0

Referee:

- Donald H. Gilchrist

Assistant referee:

- Tjasa Andrée

Judges:

- (Socialist Federal Republic of Yugoslavia) Vladimir Amsel
- (West Germany) Gerhard Frey
- (France) Monique Georgelin
- (United States) Ida Tateoka
- (East Germany) Ingrid Linke
- (Sweden) Björn Elwin
- (Soviet Union) Tatiana Danilenko
- (Czechoslovakia) Oskar Urban
- (Canada) Margaret Berezowski
- (Japan) Tsukasa Kimura (substitute)

=== Ladies ===
Rank	Name	Nation	CF	SP	FS	TFP
1	Katarina Witt	East Germany	3	1	1	3.2
2	Rosalynn Sumners	United States	1	5	2	4.6
3	Kira Ivanova	Soviet Union	5	3	5	9.2
4	Tiffany Chin	United States	12	2	3	11.0
5	Anna Kondrashova	Soviet Union	7	4	6	11.8
6	Elaine Zayak	United States	13	6	4	14.2
7	Manuela Ruben	West Germany	6	11	7	15.0
8	Elena Vodorezova	Soviet Union	2	8	11	15.4
9	Claudia Leistner	West Germany	9	10	8	17.4
10	Sanda Dubravčić	Yugoslavia	8	9	9	17.4
11	Sandra Cariboni	Switzerland	4	14	12	20.0
12	Kay Thomson	Canada	10	12	10	20.8
13	Elizabeth Manley	Canada	16	7	13	25.4
14	Myriam Oberwiler	Switzerland	15	13	14	28.2
15	Karin Telser	Italy	11	15	16	28.6
16	Katrien Pauwels	Belgium	14	16	18	32.8
17	Susan Jackson	Great Britain	19	17	15	33.2
18	Agnès Gosselin	France	18	19	17	35.4
19	Masako Kato	Japan	21	18	19	38.8
20	Catarina Lindgren	Sweden	17	22	20	39.0
21	Vicki Holland	Australia	20	20	21	41.0
22	Bao Zhenghua	China	23	21	22	44.2
23	Kim Hae-sung	South Korea	22	23	23	45.4
WD	Marta Cierco-Viqeira	Spain				

Referee:

- Sonia Bianchetti

Assistant referee:

- Radovan Lipovscak

Judges:

- (Soviet Union) Mikhail Drei
- (Socialist Federal Republic of Yugoslavia) Ante Skrtic
- (West Germany) Heinz Müllenbach
- (Italy) Giorgio Siniscalco
- (Switzerland) Jacqueline Itschner
- (East Germany) Walburga Grimm
- (United States) Raymond C. Alperth
- (Canada) Norris Bowden
- (Belgium) Claude Carlens
- (Japan) Toshio Suzuki (substitute)

=== Pairs ===
Rank	Name	Nation	SP	FS	TFP
1	Elena Valova / Oleg Vasiliev	Soviet Union	1	1	1.4
2	Kitty Carruthers / Peter Carruthers	United States	2	2	2.8
3	Larisa Selezneva / Oleg Makarov	Soviet Union	2	3	3.8
4	Sabine Baeß / Tassilo Thierbach	East Germany	4	4	5.6
5	Birgit Lorenz / Knut Schubert	East Germany	5	5	7.0
6	Jill Watson / Burt Lancon	United States	8	6	9.2
7	Barbara Underhill / Paul Martini	Canada	6	7	9.4
8	Katherina Matousek / Lloyd Eisler	Canada	9	8	11.6
9	Marina Avstriskaya / Yuri Kvashnin	Soviet Union	7	9	11.8
10	Lea Ann Miller / William Fauver	United States	10	10	14.0
11	Babette Preußler / Tobias Schröter	East Germany	14	11	16.6
12	Melinda Kunhegyi / Lyndon Johnston	Canada	13	12	17.2
13	Claudia Massari / Leonardo Azzola	West Germany	11	13	17.4
14	Susan Garland / Ian Jenkins	Great Britain	12	14	18.8
15	Luan Bo / Yao Bin	China	15	15	21.0

Referee:

- Elemér Terták

Assistant referee:

- Benjamin T. Wright

Judges:

- (United Kingdom) Pamela Davis
- (France) Alain Calmat
- (Czechoslovakia) Dagmar Řeháková
- (United States) Franklin S. Nelson
- (East Germany) Walburga Grimm
- (Canada) David Dore
- (Soviet Union) Mikhail Drei
- (West Germany) Ute Druvins
- (Japan) Toshio Suzuki
- (Belgium) Claude Carlens (substitute)

=== Ice dance ===
Rank	Name	Nation	CD	OSP	FD	TFP
1	Jayne Torvill / Christopher Dean	Great Britain	1	1	1	2.0
2	Natalia Bestemianova / Andrei Bukin	Soviet Union	2	2	2	4.0
3	Marina Klimova / Sergei Ponomarenko	Soviet Union	4	4	3	7.0
4	Judy Blumberg / Michael Seibert	United States	3	3	4	7.0
5	Carol Fox / Richard Dalley	United States	6	5	5	10.6
6	Karen Barber / Nicky Slater	Great Britain	5	6	6	11.4
7	Olga Volozhinskaya / Alexander Svinin	Soviet Union	8	7	7	14.6
8	Tracy Wilson / Robert McCall	Canada	7	8	8	15.4
9	Petra Born / Rainer Schönborn	West Germany	9	9	9	18.0
10	Elisa Spitz / Scott Gregory	United States	10	10	10	20.0
11	Wendy Sessions / Stephen Williams	Great Britain	12	11	11	22.6
12	Kelly Johnson / John Thomas	Canada	11	13	12	23.8
13	Jindra Holá / Karol Foltán	Czechoslovakia	14	12	13	26.2
14	Nathalie Hervé / Pierre Béchu	France	13	14	15	28.4
15	Isabella Micheli / Roberto Pelizzola	Italy	15	15	14	29.0
16	Klára Engi / Attila Tóth	Hungary	17	17	16	33.0
17	Noriko Sato / Tadayuki Takahashi	Japan	16	16	17	33.0
18	Khristina Boyanova / Yavor Ivanov	Bulgaria	18	18	18	36.0
19	Xi Hongyan / Zhao Xiaolei	China	19	19	19	38.0

Referee:

- Lawrence Demmy

Assistant referee:

- Hans Kutschera

Judges:

- (Hungary) István Sugár
- (Soviet Union) Irina Absaliamova
- (West Germany) Heinz Müllenbach
- (United Kingdom) Courtney J.L. Jones
- (Japan) Tsukasa Kimura
- (Czechoslovakia) Dagmar Řeháková
- (Italy) Cia Bordogna
- (Canada) Ann Shaw
- (United States) Elaine DeMore
- (France) Lysiane Lauret (substitute)

On the 30 year anniversary of the Sarajevo Winter Olympics, the pair of Jayne Torvill / Christopher Dean returned to Sarajevo on 13 February to perform Bolero.
