= Karel Fajfr =

German figure skating coach (b. 1943)

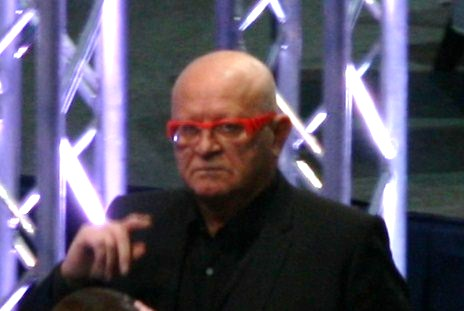
- Fajfr at 2010 Trophée Eric Bompard

Personal information
- Full name: Karel Jiri Jan Josef Fajfr
- Other names: Karl Pfeifer
- Born: 7 September 1943 (age 82) Brno, Protectorate of Bohemia and Moravia

Figure skating career
- Partner: Věra Stehlíková; Marika Nagyová

Karel Jiri Jan Josef Fajfr (born 7 September 1943) is a German figure skating coach based in Oberstdorf and a former pair skater for Czechoslovakia.

== Life and career ==
Competing in partnership with Věra Stehlíková, Fajfr won two silver medals at the Czechoslovak national championships (1964 and 1965). They won the bronze medal at the 1965 Prague Skate. After their partnership ended, he skated with Marika Nagyová for two seasons. They won two bronze medals at the Czechoslovak Championships.

Fajfr moved to Germany after the Prague Spring in 1968. From 1980 he coached in Stuttgart and led his daughter Scarlett to the 1981 German Junior national title. That same year, he coached the pair team of Tina Riegel / Andreas Nischwitz to the World bronze and European silver medals. He also coached Heiko Fischer, a five-time German national champion.

In autumn 1994 an investigation was launched into alleged abuse of some of his students. Fajfr was charged with eleven counts of sexual abuse and two counts of battery. In December 1995, he was sentenced to two years probation, fined 25,000 Deutsche Mark, and given a three-year Berufsverbot (professional disqualification).

In July 2019, another former student accused Fajfr of psychological and physical abuse.

Fajfr coaches in Oberstdorf. His former students include:

- Michal Březina
- Heiko Fischer
- Daniel Weiss
- Katharina Gierok / Florian Just
- Tina Riegel / Andreas Nischwitz
- Maylin Wende / Daniel Wende
- Annabelle Prölß / Ruben Blommaert

== Results ==
=== With Stehlíková ===
International
Event	1963–64	1964–65	1965–66
European Championships		13th	
Prague Skate			3rd
National
Czechoslovak Championships	2nd	2nd	

=== With Nagyová ===
International
Event	1966–67	1967–68
Prague Skate		7th
National
Czechoslovak Championships	3rd	3rd
