= Norbert Schramm =

German figure skater

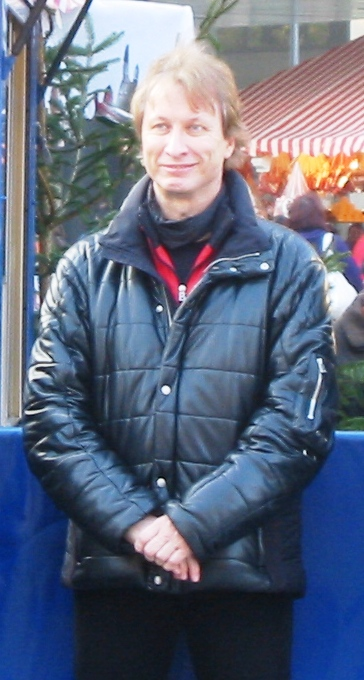
- Norbert Schramm (2011)

Personal information
- Born: April 7, 1960 (age 66) Nuremberg, Bavaria, West Germany

Figure skating career
- Country: West Germany
- Skating club: EC Oberstdorf
- Retired: 1984
Medal record
Representing West Germany
Men's Figure skating
World Championships
Silver medal – second place	1982 Copenhagen	Men's singles
Silver medal – second place	1983 Helsinki	Men's singles
European Championships
Gold medal – first place	1982 Lyon	Men's singles
Gold medal – first place	1983 Dortmund	Men's singles
Bronze medal – third place	1981 Innsbruck	Men's singles
Bronze medal – third place	1984 Dortmund	Men's singles

Norbert Schramm (born April 7, 1960) is a German former competitive figure skater. He is a two-time European champion, a two-time World silver medalist, and a three-time German national champion.

== Skating career ==
Schramm began skating at age six. He was coached by Erich Zeller at the national center in Oberstdorf, and skated for the EC Oberstdorf club representing West Germany. Amongst his team members were Rudi Cerne and Heiko Fischer. Along with three national titles, Schramm won gold twice at the European Championships and silver twice at the World Championships. He also attracted media attention for his red costumes, his choreography and spontaneous creativity on ice, as well as for creating new spins and reinventing old forgotten spins.

Schramm retired from amateur competition in 1984. He became a professional world champion in Washington, D.C., United States, appeared in ice shows such as Holiday on Ice, and directed and choreographed such shows. In 1988, he began coaching figure skaters. From 2002 until 2007 he was artistic director of the ice show at Europa-Park. In 2006 he was a representative of the German "Dancing on Ice" television show.

== Personal life ==
Schramm has a daughter, Bernadette Schramm (born on March 4, 1994), with former wife Nicola Brown. He was also married, for less than a year, to German-American filmmaker Marianne Hettinger. Schramm lives in New York City, where he works as a full-time action and people photographer. He was Grand Marshal of the 2012 Steuben Parade in New York City.

== Results ==
International
Event	75–76	76–77	77–78	78–79	79–80	80–81	81–82	82–83	83–84
Olympics									9th
Worlds				16th		7th	2nd	2nd	WD
Europeans				11th		3rd	1st	1st	3rd
Skate Canada							1st		
NHK Trophy							2nd		
Prague Skate			5th						
St. Ivel								2nd	
St. Gervais						2nd			
International: Junior
Junior Worlds	4th								
National
German Champ.		6th	5th	1st	2nd	1st	3rd	2nd	1st
WD = Withdrew
