= Natalia Bestemianova =

Russian ice dancer (born 1960)

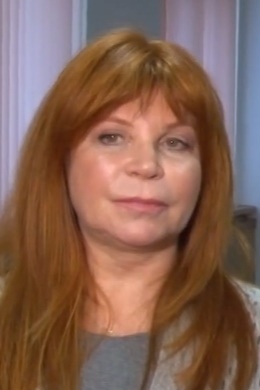
- Natalia Bestemianova in 2019

Personal information
- Full name: Natalia Filimonovna Bestemianova
- Other names: Natalya Bestemyanova
- Born: 6 January 1960 (age 66) Moscow, Russian SFSR, Soviet Union
- Height: 1.70 m (5 ft 7 in)

Figure skating career
- Retired: 1988
Medal record
Figure skating
Ice dancing
Representing Soviet Union
Olympic Games
Gold medal – first place	1988 Calgary	Ice dancing
Silver medal – second place	1984 Sarajevo	Ice dancing
World Championships
Gold medal – first place	1988 Budapest	Ice dancing
Gold medal – first place	1987 Cincinnati	Ice dancing
Gold medal – first place	1986 Geneva	Ice dancing
Gold medal – first place	1985 Tokyo	Ice dancing
Silver medal – second place	1984 Ottawa	Ice dancing
Silver medal – second place	1983 Helsinki	Ice dancing
Silver medal – second place	1982 Copenhagen	Ice dancing
Bronze medal – third place	1981 Hartford	Ice dancing
European Championships
Gold medal – first place	1988 Prague	Ice dancing
Gold medal – first place	1987 Sarajevo	Ice dancing
Gold medal – first place	1986 Sarajevo	Ice dancing
Gold medal – first place	1985 Gothenburg	Ice dancing
Silver medal – second place	1984 Budapest	Ice dancing
Gold medal – first place	1983 Dortmund	Ice dancing
Silver medal – second place	1982 Lyon	Ice dancing

Natalia Filimonovna Bestemianova or Bestemyanova (Russian: Наталья Филимоновна Бестемьянова, born 6 January 1960) is a Soviet and Russian former competitive ice dancer who competed for the Soviet Union. With her partner Andrei Bukin, she is the 1988 Olympic Champion, 1984 Olympic silver medalist, four-time World champion, three-time World silver medalist, and five-time European champion.

== Life and career ==
Bestemianova was coached by Tatiana Tarasova and competed in ice dance with Andrei Bukin. Figure skating historian James R. Hines called their free dance programs "unconventional and avant garde", and stated that they were "equally strong in the more conservative compulsory dances". Hines compared Bestemianova and Bukin to British ice dancers Jayne Torvill and Christopher Dean, saying that they were "less suave" and "more energetic".

Bestemianova and Bukin came in 10th place at the 1979 World Championships. In 1980, they came in fifth place at the European Championships. In 1981, they came in fourth place at both Worlds and Europeans. In 1984, Bestemianova was named an Honoured Master of Sports of the USSR.

Bestemianova and Bukin capped their lengthy career by winning the gold medal at the 1988 Winter Olympics and that year's World Figure Skating Championships. The Besti Squat was Bestemianova's signature move and is unofficially named for her.

They skated in ice shows after their retirement, including in Champions on Ice and Holiday on Ice.

In 1983, Bestemianova married Igor Bobrin. After she finished her career she performed in the Ice Miniature Theater, led by her husband. She is the stepmother of Maxim, Igor's son from his previous marriage. Together, they run Moscow Stars on Ice.

In 2006–2008, Bestemianova appeared as a coach and show-host in the Russian version of the British show Dancing on Ice, shown on Russian RTR. In early 2007, she appeared as a member of the ice panel for the British show Dancing on Ice, shown on ITV1. In 2011–2012, Bestemianova was on the panel of judges for the Channel One Russia television show Cup of Professionals.

== Competitive highlights ==
=== Ice dance with Bukin ===
International
Event	77–78	78–79	79–80	80–81	81–82	82–83	83–84	84–85	85–86	86–87	87–88
Olympics			8th				2nd				1st
Worlds		10th		3rd	2nd	2nd	2nd	1st	1st	1st	1st
Europeans			6th	4th	2nd	1st	2nd	1st	1st	1st	1st
Skate America			2nd								
NHK Trophy										1st	1st
Moscow News		4th	2nd	3rd	1st	1st	1st	2nd	1st		
National
Soviet Champ.	3rd	4th	2nd	3rd	1st	1st		2nd		1st	

=== Ladies' singles ===
International
Event	1976–77
Prague Skate	5th

== Programs ==
(With Bukin)

Season	Original set pattern	Free dance	Exhibition
1987–1988	Tango Hernando's Hideaway	Polovtsian Dances	
1986–1987		Cabaret medley	
1985–1986		Rhapsody on a Theme of Paganini	
1984–1985		Carmen	
1983–1984	Pasodoble		
1982–1983			
1981–1982		FD: "Sabre Dance" by Aram Khatchaturian, "Romeo and Juliet" by Tchiakovsky, Finale from "William Tell" Overture by Rossini (modern piano version)	
1980–1981			
1979–1980			

== See also ==
- Besti squat
