= Mark Reed (figure skater) =

British ice dancer

Mark Reed is a British ice dancer. He won the 1977 World Junior Figure Skating Championships with partner Wendy Sessions. He won the 1981 Nebelhorn Trophy with partner Karen Roughton.
