= Figure skating spins =

Element in competitive figure skating

Figure skating element
- Element name: Spin
- Scoring abbreviation: Sp

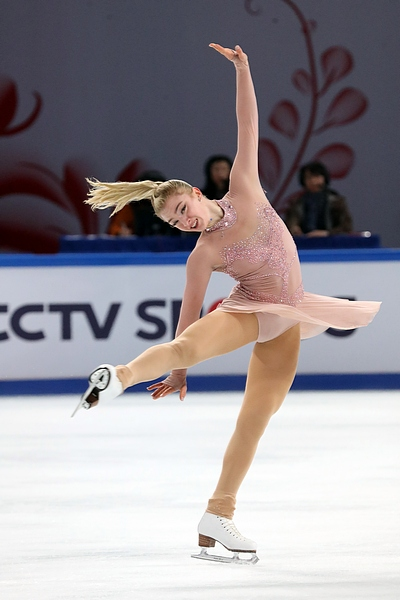
Amber Glenn performing an upright spin

Spins are an element in figure skating in which the skater rotates, centered on a single point on the ice, while holding one or more body positions. They are performed by all disciplines of the sport, single skating, pair skating, and ice dance, and are a required element in most figure skating competitions. As The New York Times says, "While jumps look like sport, spins look more like art. While jumps provide the suspense, spins provide the scenery, but there is so much more to the scenery than most viewers have time or means to grasp". According to world champion and figure skating commentator Scott Hamilton, spins are often used "as breathing points or transitions to bigger things".

Figure skating spins, along with jumps, spirals, and spread eagles were originally individual compulsory figures, sometimes special figures. Unlike jumps, spins were a "graceful and appreciated" part of figure skating throughout the 19th century. They advanced between World War I and World War II; by the late 1930s, all three basic spin positions were used.

There are two types of spins, the forward spin and the backward spin. There are three basic spin positions: the upright spin, the sit spin, and the camel spin. Skaters also perform flying spins and spin combinations. The International Skating Union (ISU), figure skating's governing body, delineates rules, regulations, and scoring points for each type and variety of spin.

== Background ==
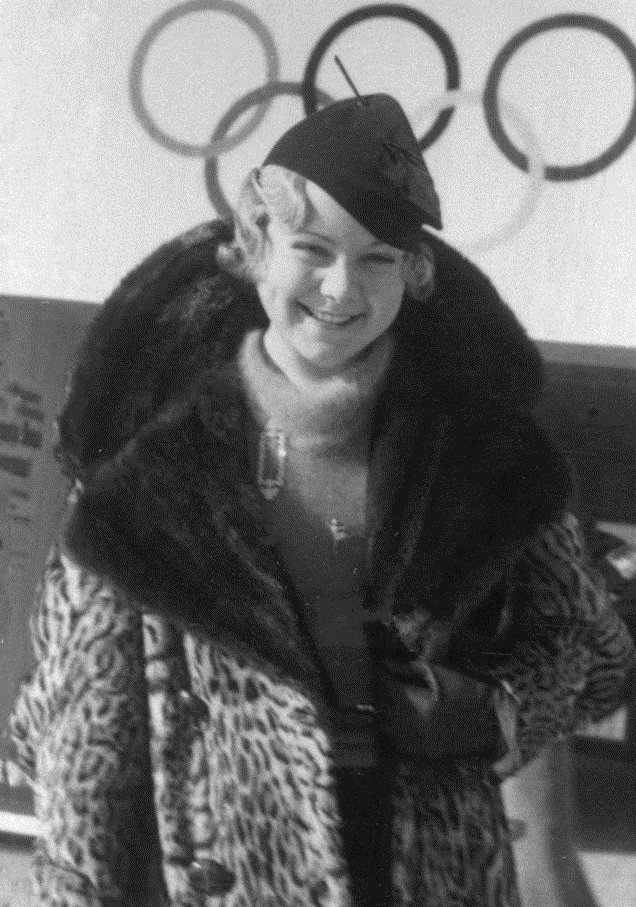
Sonja Henie, 1936

Figure skating spins, along with jumps, spirals, and spread eagles were originally individual compulsory figures, sometimes special figures. Unlike jumps, spins were a "graceful and appreciated" part of figure skating throughout the 19th century. Jean Garcin, who wrote one of the first books about figure skating in the early 1800s, recognizes their beauty, especially when used as a way to conclude a figure artistically. Figure skater and historian Irving Brokaw categorizes spin variations not into positions as they are categorized today, but into different changes of the skating foot. He writes in the early 1900s about the importance of spins and insists that advanced skaters should be able to execute one or more spin varieties on either foot. Spins were performed in the early days of pair skating by more skilled and experienced skaters, often as conclusions to their programs. Figure skating historian James Hines states that even in modern skating, spins are placed at the end of programs to make them more exciting.

Spins "advanced greatly" between World War I and World War II. The spins performed by Norwegian skater Sonja Henie, which can be viewed in her films made during the 1930s, often reached 40 or more revolutions and were "usually well-centered, fast, and as exciting to watch today as they were then". By the late 1930s, all three basic spin positions were used. Skaters were expected to spin in both directions at the time, but as spins became faster and more difficult, they were only expected to spin in one direction. Skaters like American Ronnie Robertson in the 1950s, Swiss Denise Biellmann in the 1980s, and Swiss Lucinda Ruh in the 1990s, had "an uncanny ability to perform spins", and were sometimes able to execute up to five revolutions per second in the upright position. Canadian figure skater Olivia Oliver holds the Guinness World Record for the fastest spin, 342 rotations per minute, which she completed in Warsaw in 2015. However, as researchers Lee Cabell and Erica Bateman stated in 2018, "Unfortunately, modern figure skaters often do not achieve these types of revolutions because the rules require skaters to perform spins in different body positions".

World champion and commentator Scott Hamilton reported that Robertson would spin so fast that he would break blood vessels in his hands. Hamilton also stated that Robertson and Ruh were so good at executing spins that they "would find that part of the blade that had no friction with the ice, and they would spin at the same speed forever. It just seemed like it would never end, and they could change positions and then recrank the spin and make it happen again". Ruh, however, suffered from chronic nausea and dizziness and would regularly lose consciousness during practices or in hotel rooms. She was eventually diagnosed with mini-concussions that were probably linked to executing spins and the forces generated by them, especially during layback spins. Ruh also later stated that the rotational speeds she was able to maintain and the long hours practicing and performing them most likely contributed to the severity of her injuries.

Pair spins became part of competitive figure skating between the world wars; side-by-side spins, along with death spirals, lifts, throw jumps, side-by-side jumps, and side-by-side footwork sequences, were a part of pair skating by the 1930s. In ice dance, there were limitations to dance spins, as well as for other moves associated with pair skating like jumps and lifts, when ice dance became a competitive sport and throughout the 1950s. Spins were limited to a maximum of one-and-a-half revolutions when done by one partner and to two-and-a-half revolutions when they spun around each other. These limitations were put in place to ensure its distinction from pair skating.

== Execution ==
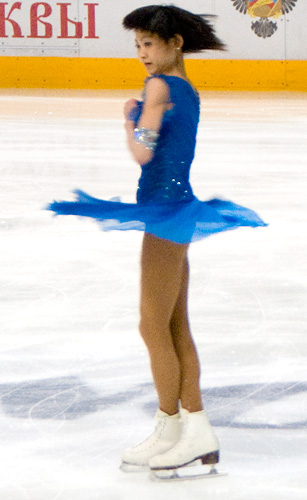
Yuko Kawaguti, 2010. Illustration of angular momentum: As a skater pulls in her arms, she reduces her moment of inertia and rotates faster.

As The New York Times says, "While jumps look like sport, spins look more like art. While jumps provide the suspense, spins provide the scenery, but there is so much more to the scenery than most viewers have time or means to grasp". According to Scott Hamilton, spins are often used "as breathing points or transitions to bigger things" and are more difficult to explain to the audience "because there is so much going on". Hamilton stated that explaining the intricacies of spins, like edge changes, is challenging because they are difficult to see.

Most beginning skaters learn to execute spins in the counter-clockwise direction, but some may execute them clockwise. Most spins are executed on one foot, except for the two-foot spin, which beginning skaters tend to learn first, and the cross-foot spin. The two-foot spin consists of three essential parts—the setup, the windup, and the spin—as well as the exit, which can be done by rotating in a closed spinning position until stopping or by using a back inside edge with a change of foot.

The effect of linear and rotational forces is most apparent and most powerful when performing spins. The successful accomplishment of spins depends on the effective management of angular momentum, which occurs during the entrance of a spin and ends once a skater is in the spin and all linear force is translated into angular velocity. The skater rotates around the point at which their blade touches the ice, the most important point on the vertical axis of their body, and a fixed vertical axis that extends from the blade on the ice to the highest point in their body. The absence of angular momentum means that fewer variables, or vectors, influence the resulting motion, so if the center of gravity is maintained, spins should be easier to perform than other elements such as jumps. The change from angular momentum to angular speed around a fixed vertical axis is difficult to control, though, as is the change from one force to another in general. Moving forward quickly also cannot be efficiently converted into fast angular speed, so the conversion of fast linear motion, which produces a lot of force, into fast rotational motion is small. Therefore, is it a waste of energy to build up speed going into a spin; entering a spin slowly achieves the same result and will probably be more consistent.

A spin consists of the following parts: preparation, entry, spin, and exit. During the preparation phase, skaters decrease the radius of the skating curve and velocity/speed, which means that the skater must increase how much they lean into the spin. As researchers Lee Cabell and Erica Bateman state, "A step against the gliding edge exerts a force on the ice; the resultant torque about the axis of rotation results in the angular momentum that is used during the spin". Greater force during the initial push of the spin's preparation phase results in greater torque and angular momentum, which will result in a faster spin. The exit coming out of a spin occurs in two stages: breaking the spin's rotational spin and the exit itself. There are many exit variations of spins.

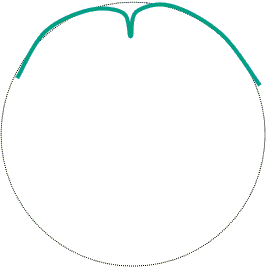
The 3 turn, a movement used in many spins

The entry phase of a spin produces a logarithmic curve with an indefinite number of radii, smallest at the end and largest at the beginning. When the entry curve radius is decreased, the skater will change the angle of their lean towards the vertical axis, gradually reducing the velocity/speed. The curve ends with a 3 turn, then the center of gravity is slightly lower, resulting in the skater to begin to spin. After the initiation of the actual spin, they will exhibit a large moment of inertia. Their shoulders are square to the hips and rotating with each other at the same angular velocity. The skater's center of gravity must be directly above their base of support (for example, where the blade is in contact with the ice) in order for them to execute a balanced spin. If the spin is not balanced and centered, the vertical projection of the center of gravity moves away from its base of support, which results in the spinning blade making small loops on the ice.

The ISU defines an exit out of a spin as "the last phase of the spin and includes the phase immediately following the spin". A difficult exit is defined as any jump or movement that makes the exit "significantly more difficult", and must have a significant impact on the spin's execution, balance, and control. When executing flying spins and spins in one position, skaters must start a difficult exit from the basic position, and not during the final windup. Difficult exits may start from any position during spin combinations.

The skater's goal for most spins is to rotate as quickly as possible, maintain a well-defined and pleasing body position, maintain perfect balance before, during, and after the spin, and to remain in one place, called centering, while executing a spin. A good spin should rotate in one place on the ice, "drawing a series of tiny overlapping circles on top of each other" into the ice. A skater who executes a spin that is not centered will travel across the ice, "producing a series of loops strung out along a curve or straight line, so that the skater will end the spin several feet away from the spot on the ice where she began it". In order to rotate rapidly, the skater must increase their speed (rotations per minute), which is accomplished by reducing the distance of the vertical axis from the parts of their body. This is done by bringing their arms and free leg closer to their body, in line with the vertical axis. Since the true center of gravity is at the point in which the blade meets the ice, the skater must also lower their arms and free leg toward that point. The force created by the spin is directed outward and upward, along the path of least resistance, as their speed increases. When skaters allow the force to follow the path of least resistance, however, they will lose some of the force that contributes to rotational speed, so when they increase a spin's speed, they must move their arms and free leg inward and downward. Exactly how this is done varies depending on the type of spin skaters perform.

Skaters experience dizziness during spins because, as they spin, their eyes focus on an immobile object and follow it until the object passes beyond their peripheral vision. Then their eyes race ahead to focus on a new object, and as the spin ends, their eyes continue to follow this pattern, causing dizziness. It takes practice to train the eyes to return to normal, which dissipates the experience of dizziness.

== Types/positions of spins ==
There are two types of spins, the forward spin and the backward spin. The forward spin is executed on the back inside edge of the skate and is entered into by the forward outside edge and 3 turn; the equivalent movement is ballet in the pirouette en dedans. The backward spin, which is executed on the back outside edge, is entered into by the forward inside edge and 3 turn; the equivalent movement in ballet is the pirouette en dehors.

There are three basic spin positions: the upright spin, the sit spin, and the camel spin. (Note: See ISU's "Communication No. 2707", pages 5—8; 12 for points awarded for each spin and varieties of spin.)

=== Upright spin ===
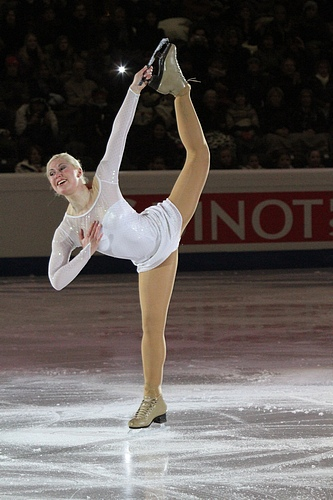
Denise Biellmann, 2011

The upright spin is one of the three basic figure skating spin positions. The ISU defines an upright spin as a spin with "any position with the skating leg extended or slightly bent which is not a camel position". It was invented by British figure skater Cecilia Colledge, who was the first to execute it. Variations of the upright spin include the layback spin, the Biellman spin (created by world champion Denise Biellmann), the full layback, the split, the back upright spin, the forward upright spin, the scratch spin (also called the blur spin), and the sideways leaning spin

=== Sit spin ===
The sit spin, invented by American figure skater Jackson Haines, "represents one of the most important spins in skating". It is executed on one foot, in a sitting position, with the knee of the skating leg bent in a one-legged crouch position and the free leg held in front, to the side, or to the back. It is difficult to learn, requires a great deal of energy, and may not be as exciting to perform as other elements, such as jumps, but it has variations that make it more creative and pleasurable to watch.

=== Camel spin ===
Colledge was responsible for the invention of the camel spin (also called the parallel spin); she was the first to perform it in the mid-1930s. Writer Ellyn Kestnbaum speculates that the camel and layback spins, which "heightened the visual function of the skater creating interesting shapes with her body", were, for the first ten years after their inventions, performed mostly by women and not by men because it was easier for women to achieve the interesting shapes the camel spin creates than it is for men. American skater Dick Button, however, performed the first forward camel spin, a variation of the camel spin, and spins became a regular part of the repertoire of male skaters. The camel spin is executed on one foot and is an adaptation of the arabesque ballet pose to the ice. When executed well, the stretch of the body should create a slight arch or straight line.

=== Flying spins ===
A flying spin is the combination of a jump and a spin. A flying spin can be appealing for the audience to watch and exciting for the skater to perform. Petrovich describes three types of flying spins: the flying camel, the flying sit spin, and the butterfly. The flying camel consists of a jump from a left forward outside edge, about one revolution in the air, with the landing executed in a camel spin. Dick Button might have been the first skater to successfully execute the flying camel; for many years, it was called the "Button camel". The flying sit spin was first performed by Buddy Vaughn and Bill Grimditch, who were students of figure skating coach Gustav Lussi, but Button and Ronnie Robertson made it famous. It consists of a take-off from a left forward outside edge, a sit spin position in the air during one-and-a-half revolutions, and a landing in a sit spin. According to Petkevich, "When the jump is high, it can be an exhilarating maneuver for skater and audience alike". The butterfly spin is so named because it describes the position in the air. It consists of a take-off from both feet, a body position horizontal to the ice, and a landing in a back spin. It is often performed at the end of a skater's program because, although it adds to a program's technical content, it does not require much precision or energy to execute.

The jump section of flying spins is executed at the beginning of the spin and is part of the entrance into it. The angular momentum at the entrance, like for all spins, must be converted into pure rotational momentum. In ordinary jumps, angular momentum allows the skater to travel a long distance across the rink and propel high into the air, but for flying spins, the principles that govern the spin dominate the jump portion of the spin. The goal is to minimize forward motion on the jump portion. Creating speed on the spin portion is also a goal, but a flying spin never achieves the speed of a basic spin because some of the forces assigned to achieving the speed in a basic spin must be used to achieve height on the flying spin's jump portion. Centering the spin after the jump depends on converting all the angular momentum into rotational momentum. Mastering the flying spin takes less time and practice if skaters have already mastered basic spin techniques and good jumping ability.

=== Spin combinations ===
Spin combinations are required in the short programs and free skating programs of single skaters and pair skaters. Flying spins and basic spins can be combined in any number of variations. The maintenance, or acceleration, of the rotational momentum created on the entrance of the first spin is the most important principle governing the execution of spin combinations, which require quick movements during the spins' transitions. When a change of feet is required to successfully perform spin combinations, the center of rotation of subsequent spins should be as close as possible to the center of rotation of the first spin of the combination. Spin combinations must include more than one position and may or may not involve a change of foot.

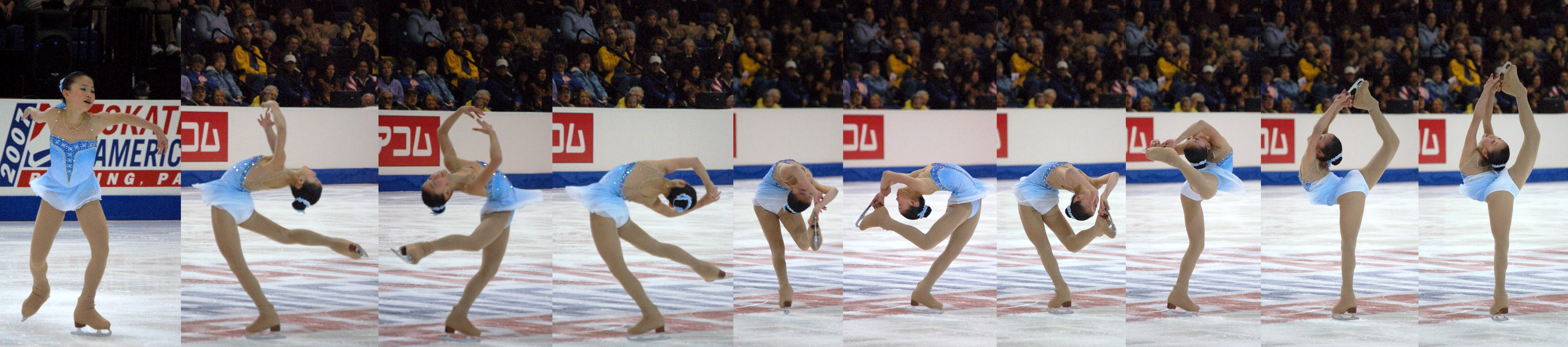
Caroline Zhang performing a combination spin, 2007

== Rules and regulations ==
=== Single skating ===
If a skater performs a spin that has no basic position with only two revolutions, or with less than two revolutions, they do not fulfill the position requirement for the spin, and receives no points for it. A spin with less than three revolutions is not considered a spin; rather, it is considered a skating movement. The flying spin and any spin that only has one position must have six revolutions; spin combinations must have ten revolutions. Required revolutions are counted from when the skater enters the spin until they exit out of it, except for flying spins and the spins in which the final wind-up is in one position. Skaters increase the difficulty of camel spins by grabbing their leg or blade while performing the spin.

A skater must make at least two revolutions in one position, without interruption; if this requirement is not fulfilled, the position is not counted. A change of foot of any spin must occur both before and after a spin position. All spins with a change of foot must have three revolutions on each foot. Spins with one position and a change of foot must have two revolutions per foot. If a skater falls while entering a spin, they can fill the lost time by executing a spin or spinning movement immediately afterwards; however, this movement will not be counted as an element. The ISU states, "If the spinning centers (before and after the change of foot) are too far apart and the criteria of 'two spins' is fulfilled (there is a curve of exit after the first part and the curve of entry into the second part), only the part before the change of foot" will earn points.

Difficult spin variations increase the level of a spin and are worth more points. These variations include movements of the body part, head, leg, arm, or hand that require flexibility or physical strength and that affect the balance of the skater's main body core. There are 11 categories of difficult spin variations; three are in the camel spin position, based on the direction of the skater's shoulder line.

A spin combination must have at least "two different basic positions with two revolutions in each of these positions anywhere within the spin". Skaters earn the full value of a spin combination when they include all three basic positions. The number of revolutions in non-basic positions is included in the total number of revolutions, but changing to a non-basic position is not considered a change of position. The change of foot and change of position can be made at the same time or separately, and can be performed as a jump or a step-over movement. Non-basic positions are allowed during spins executed in one position or, for single skaters, during a flying spin.

A difficult blade feature occurs when skaters use the blade of their skates "in a way that has a significant impact on the balance, control and execution of the spin". It must be executed in camel spins, sit spins, layback spins, or Bielmann spins. It can also occur during a difficult variation of an upright position and must be maintained through the entire feature, such as spinning of the toe or heel of the blade. It is not considered a difficult exit. The ISU also states, "The feature must be performed in control inside the spin and spinning must continue after the feature on the same foot".

Skaters must include one of the following features if they want to earn the highest score possible for a spin: a difficult exit; a clear change of edge; a clear increase of spin; a difficult entry into a flying entry; and a windmill. They must also excute both directions immediately following each other for sit spins, camel spins, layback spins, a difficult variation in an upright position. The windmill feature must be executed three times in a row and can be included in any type of spin. Each windmill must reach at least 135 degrees (close as possible to a split position). They are also counted only once in a program, and the first time a skater attempts it.

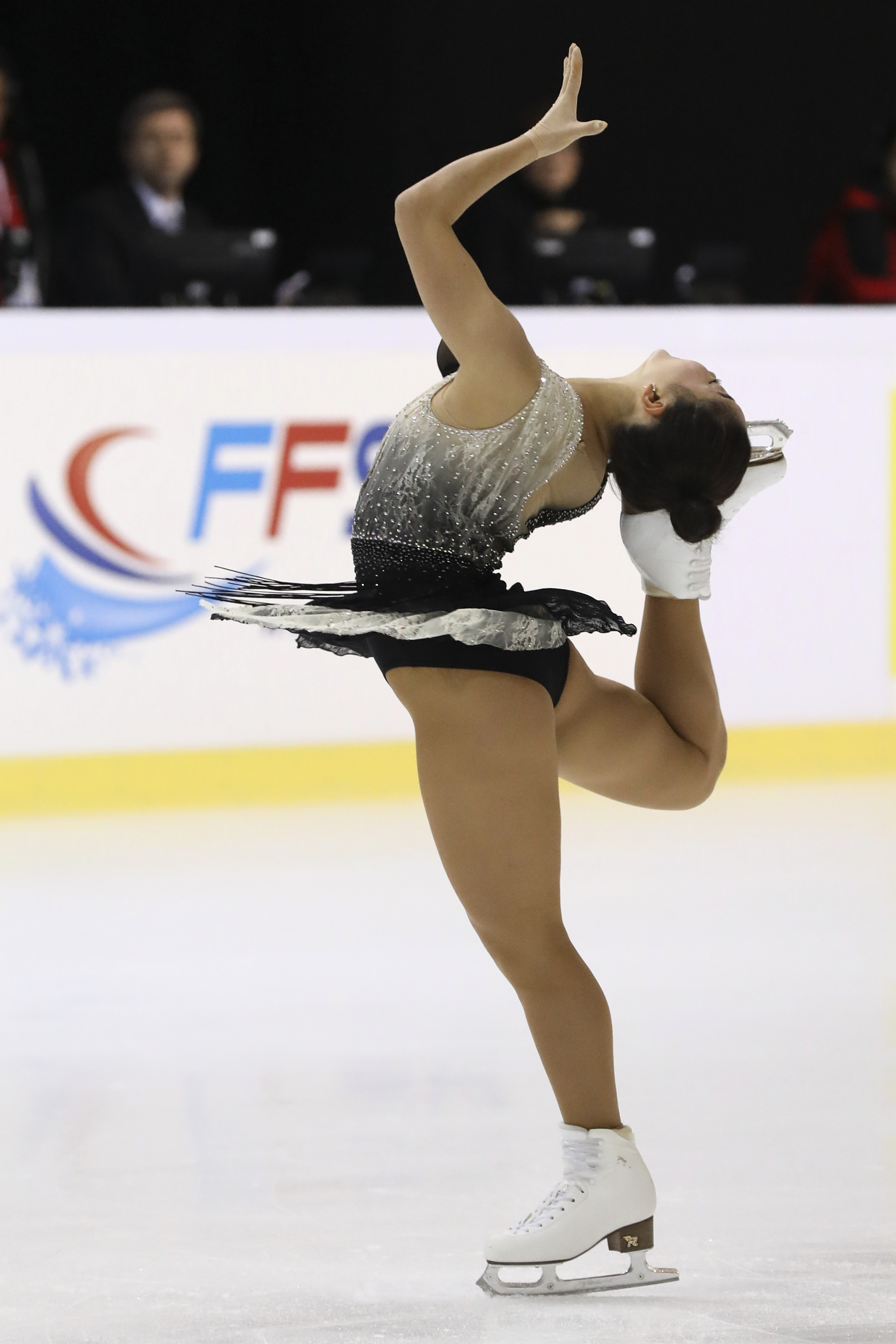
Haircutter spin
Wakaba Higuchi

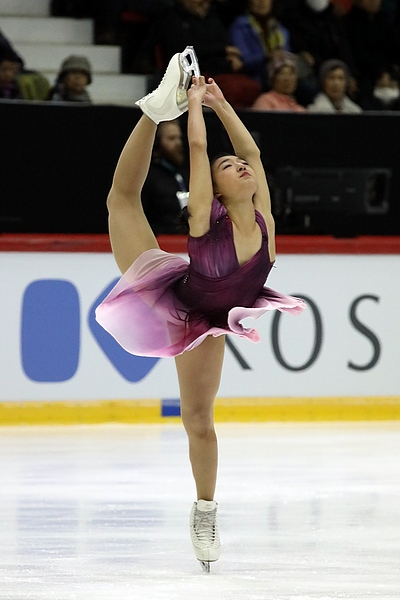
Biellmann spin
Kaori Sakamoto

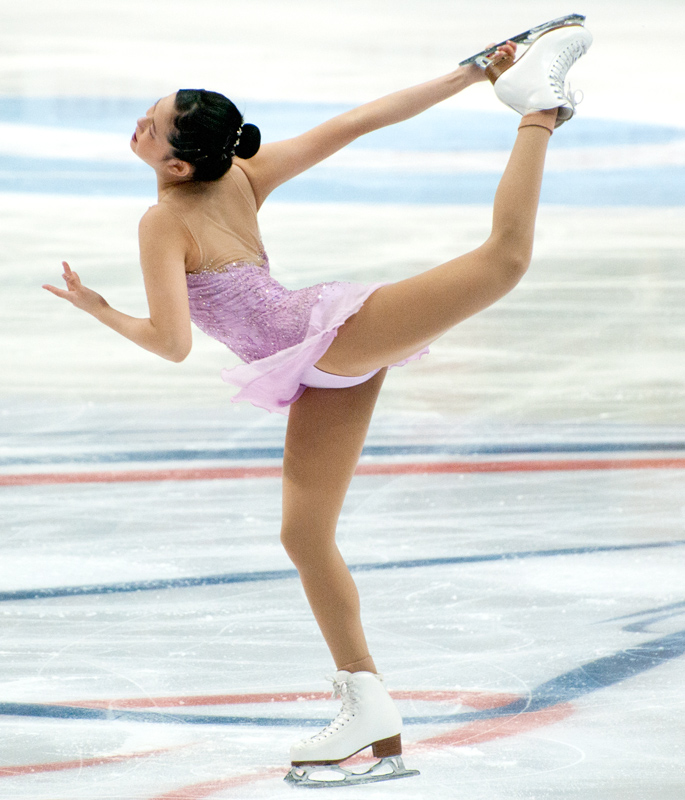
Catch-foot camel spin
Haruka Imai

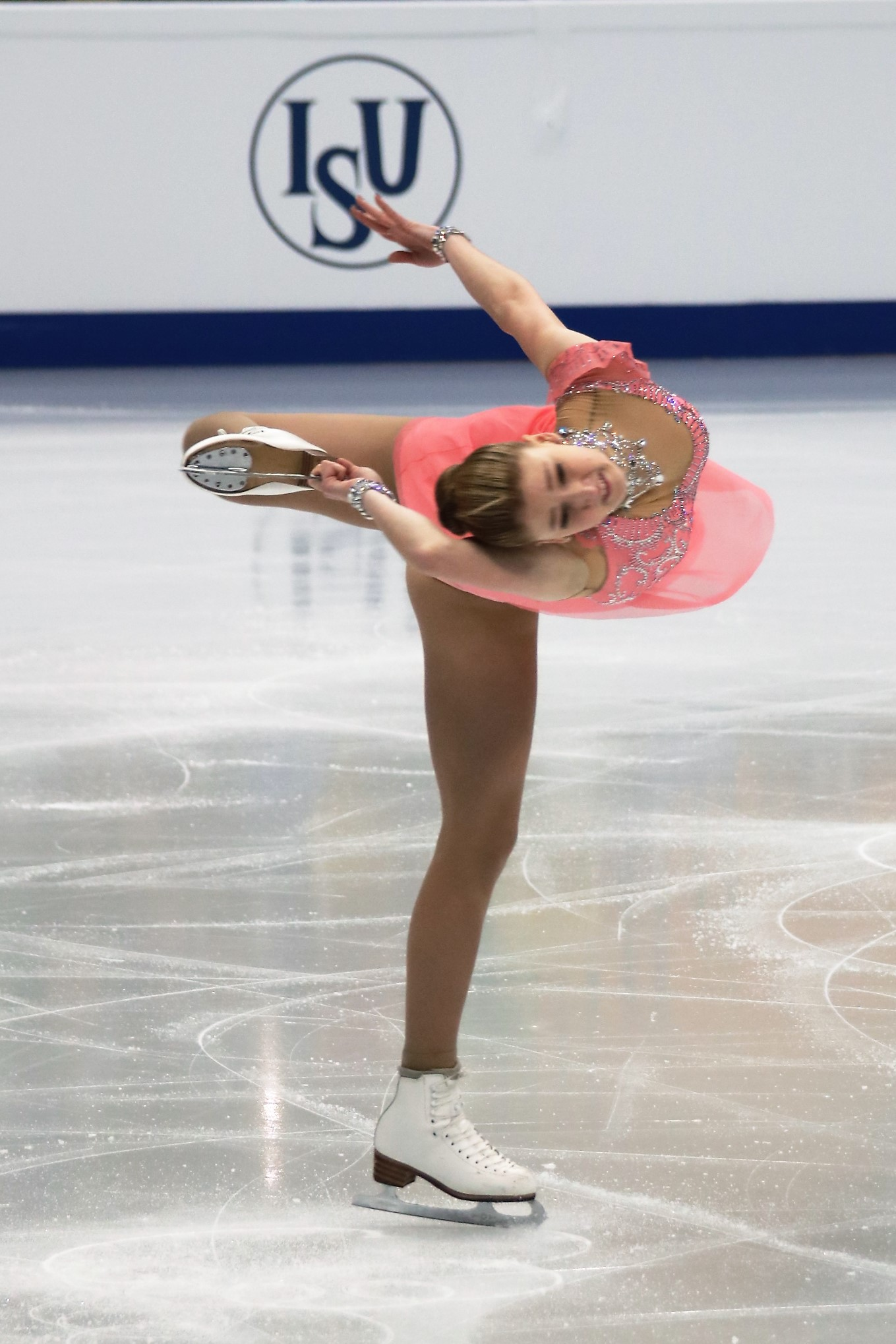
Donut spin
Maria Sotskova

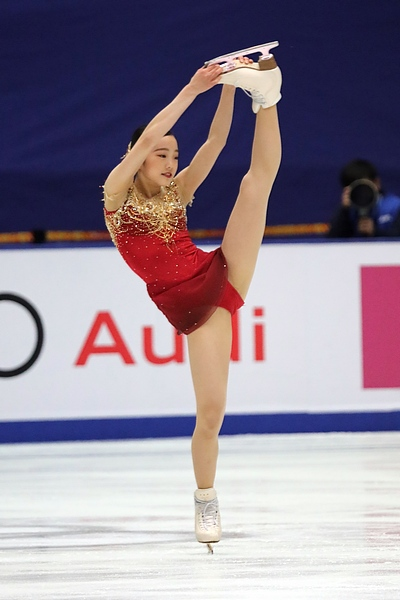
Upright spin
Marin Honda

=== Pair skating ===
==== Solo spin combinations ====
The solo spin combination must be performed once during the short program of pair skating competitions, with at least two revolutions in two basic positions. Both partners must include all three basic positions to earn the full possible points. There must be a minimum of five revolutions made on each foot. Spins can be commenced with jumps and must have at least two different basic positions, and both partners must include two revolutions in each position. A solo spin combination must have all three basic positions (the camel spin, the sit spin, and upright positions) performed by both partners at any time during the spin to receive the full value of points, and must have all three basic positions performed by both partners to receive full value for the element. A spin with less than three revolutions is not counted as a spin; rather, it is considered a skating movement. If a skater changes to a non-basic position, (Note: A non-basic position is defined as "all the other positions not fulfilling the requirements of any basic positions".) it is not considered a change of position. The number of revolutions in non-basic positions, which may be considered difficult variations, is counted towards the team's total number of revolutions. Only positions, whether basic or non-basic, must be performed by the partners at the same time.

If a skater falls while entering into the spin, they can perform another spin or spinning movement immediately after the fall, to fill the time lost from the fall, but it is not counted as a solo spin combination. A change of foot, in the form of a jump or step over, is allowed, and the change of position and change of foot can be performed separately or at the same time.

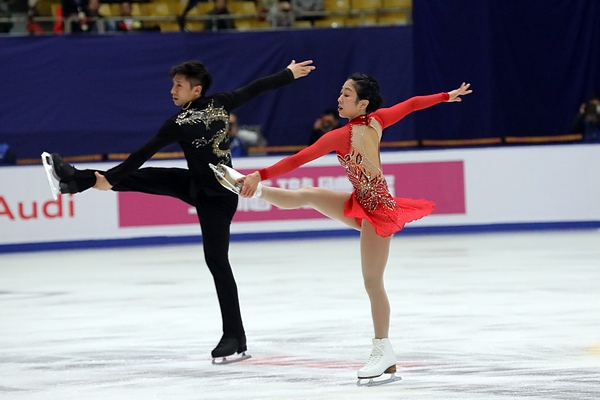
Side by side spins
Sui Wenjing and Han Cong

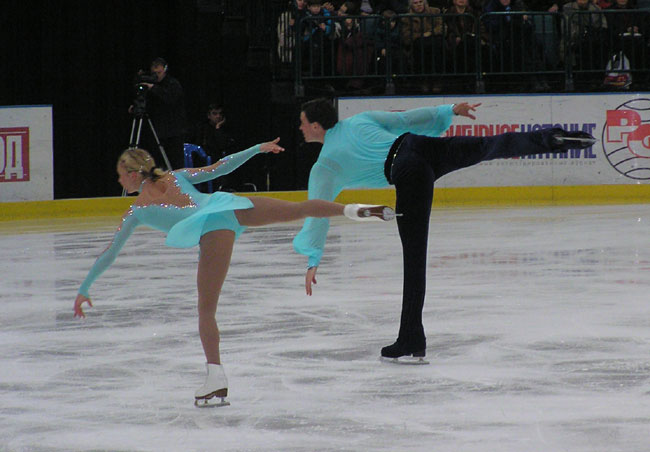
Side by side camel spins
Tatiana Totmianina and Maxim Marinin

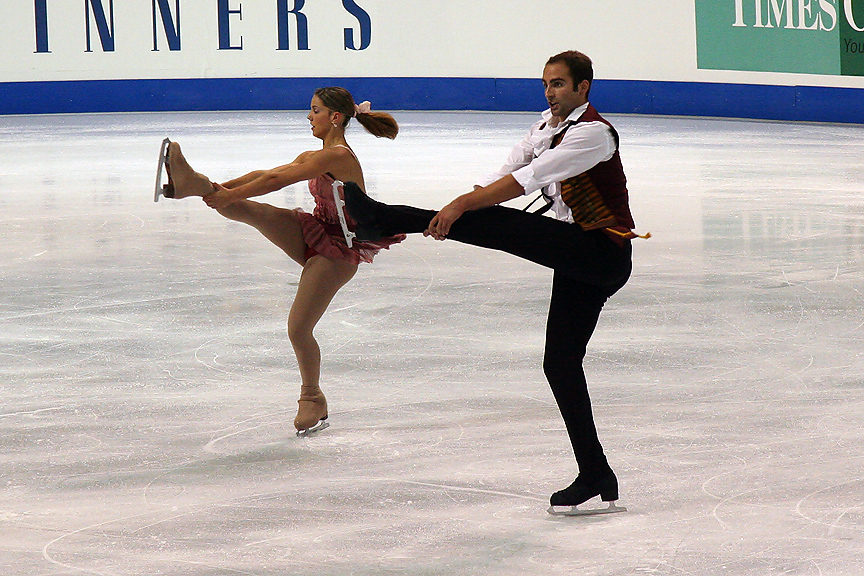
Side by side spins
Tiffany Vise and Derek Trent

==== Pair spin combinations ====
Both junior and senior pair teams must perform one pair spin combination, which may begin with a fly spin, during their free skating programs. Pair spin combinations must have at least eight revolutions; the minimum number of required revolutions "must be counted from the entry of the spin until its exit". If spins are done with less than two revolutions, pairs receive zero points; if they have less than three revolutions, they are considered a skating movement, not a spin. Pair teams cannot stop, except for a short step when changing directions, while performing a rotation. Spins must have at least two different basic positions, with two revolutions in each position performed by both partners anywhere within the spin; full value for pair spin combinations is awarded only when both partners perform all three basic positions. A spin executed in both clockwise and counterclockwise directions is considered one spin. When a team simultaneously performs spins in both directions that immediately follow each other, they earn more points, but they must execute a minimum of three revolutions in each direction without any changes in position.

Pair teams receive more points if the spin contains three difficult variations, two of which can be non-basic positions, although each partner must have at least one difficult variation. The pair team must each perform at least one change of foot, although not necessarily at the same time. The spin can also begin with a fly spin; they earn more points if one or both partners perform a difficult entrance or any fly entrance. They also earn more points if they perform a difficult exit. A difficult exit, in which the skaters exit the spin in a lift or spinning movement, is defined as "an innovative move that makes the exit significantly more difficult". They earn more points if their change in directions immediately follow each other, if the man lifts the woman while he is one foot for at least one revolution, and when they perform at least six revolutions "without any changes in position/variation and foot (camel, sit, difficult upright)". If one or both partners fall while entering a spin, they can execute a spin or a spinning movement to fill up the time lost during the fall.

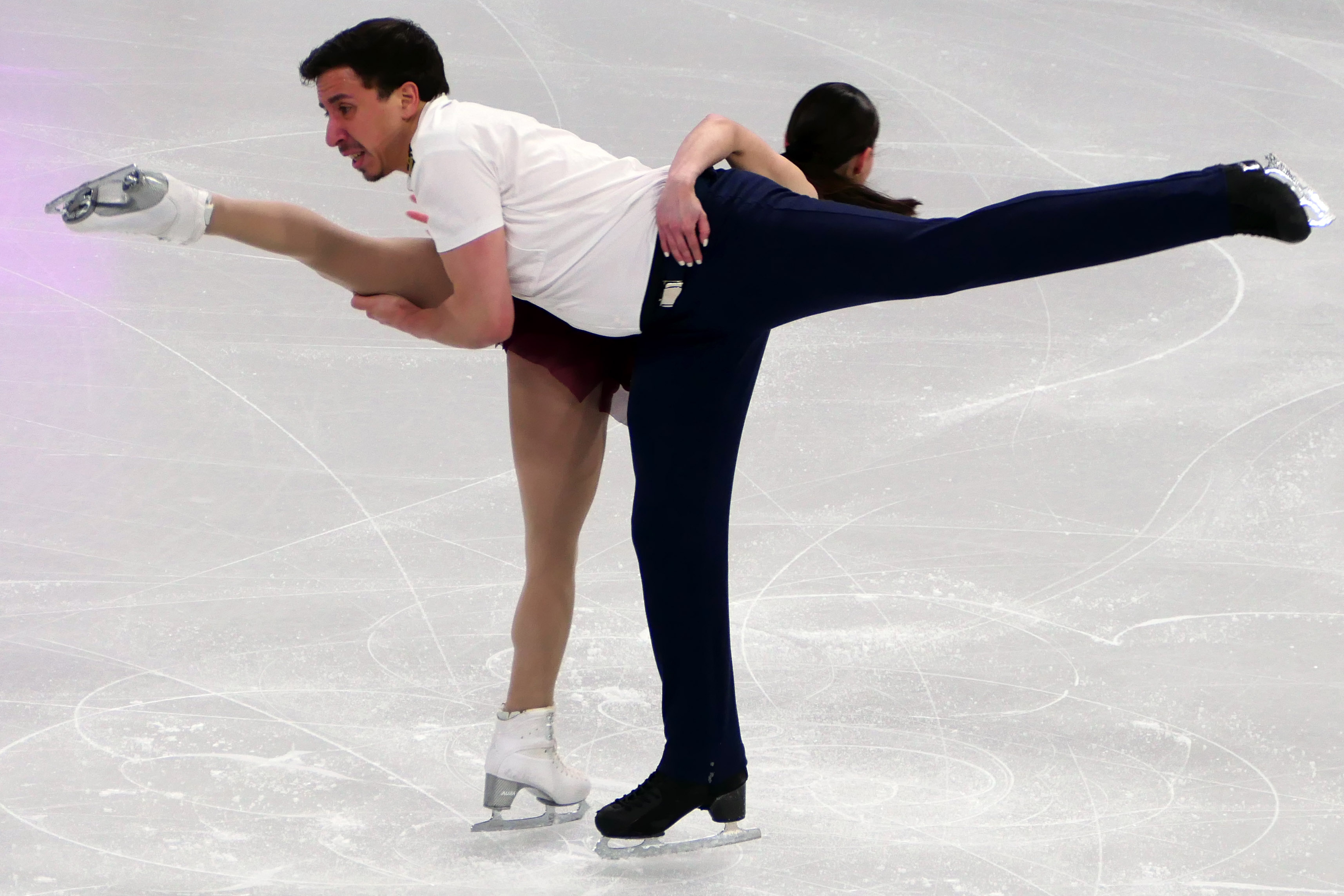
Valentina Plazas and Maximiliano Fernandez

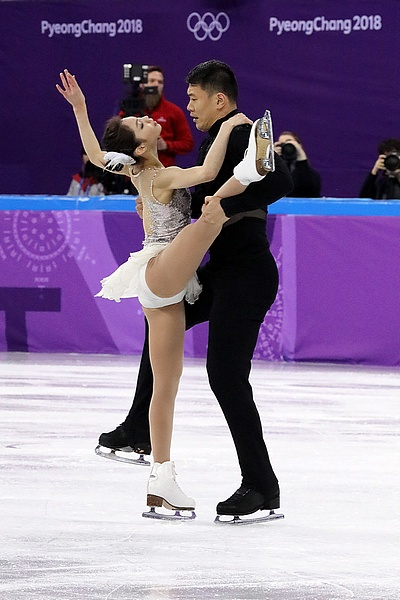
Yu Xiaoyu and Zhang Hao

=== Ice dance spins ===
The ISU defines a dance spin as "a spin skated by the Couple together in any hold". The ISU also states, "It should be performed on the spot around a common axis on one foot by each partner simultaneously". The solo spin, or pirouette, is allowed and defined as "a spinning movement performed on one foot", with or without the partner's assistance, performed by both partners at the same time but around separate centers. The ISU announces dance spin variations or combinations at the beginning of each season.

Dance spins have three positions. The upright position is performed on one foot with the skating leg slightly bent or straight and with the upper body upright, bent to the side, or with an arched back. The sit position is done on one foot, with "the skating leg bent in a one-legged crouch position and with the free leg forward, either to the back or the side". The camel position is done on one foot, with "the skating leg straight or slightly bent forward, and with the free leg extended or bent forward horizontally or higher".

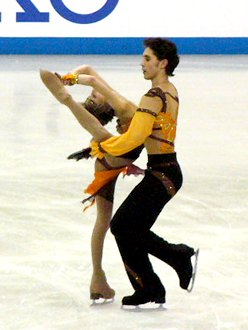
Jana Khokhlova & Sergei Novitski, 2003

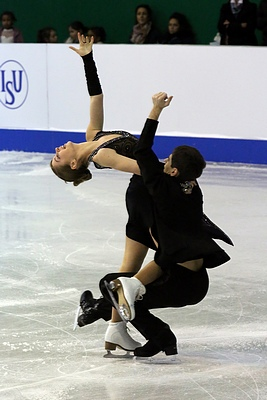
Oleksandra Nazarova & Maksym Nikitin, 2014

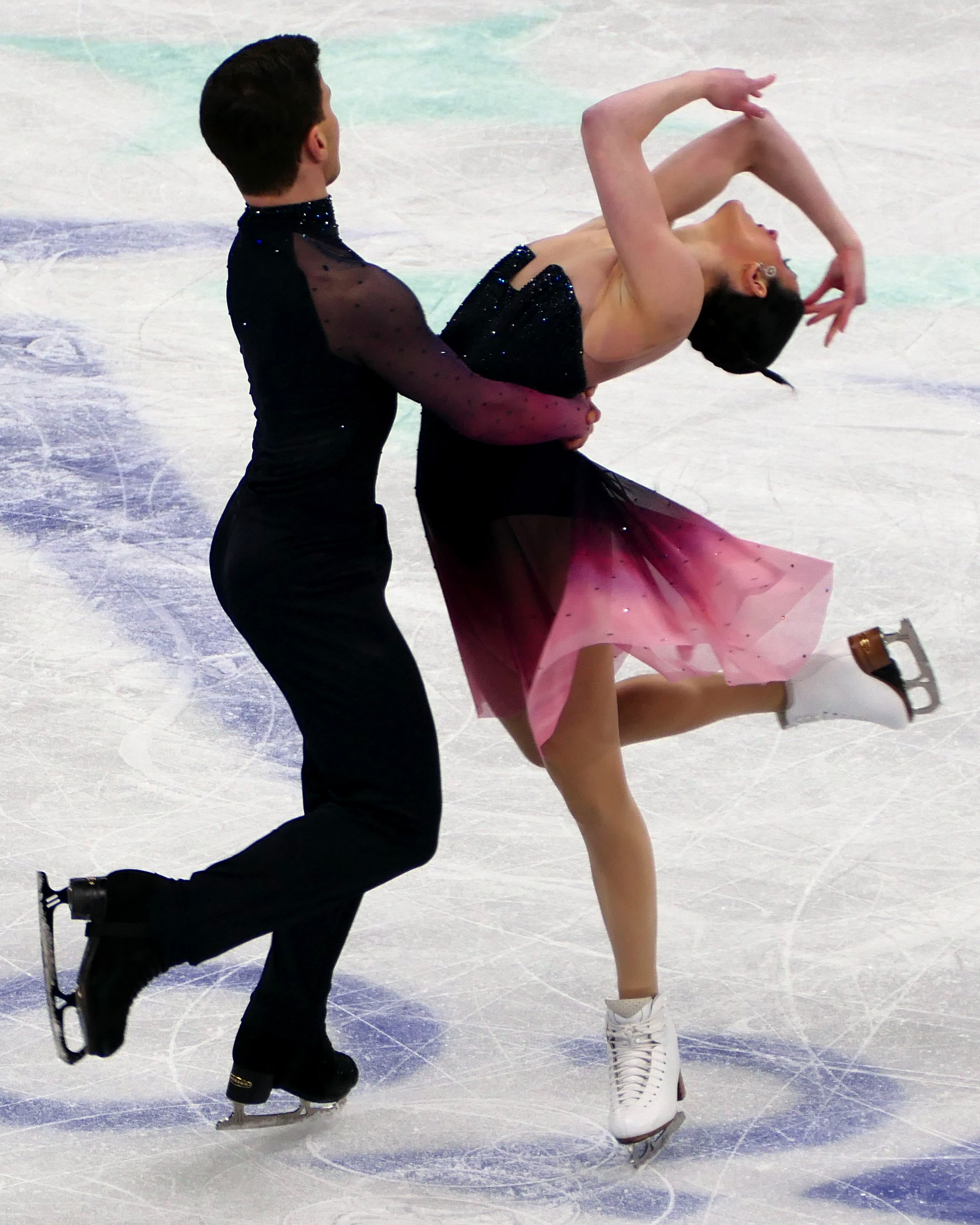
Charlene Guignard & Marco Fabbri, 2024

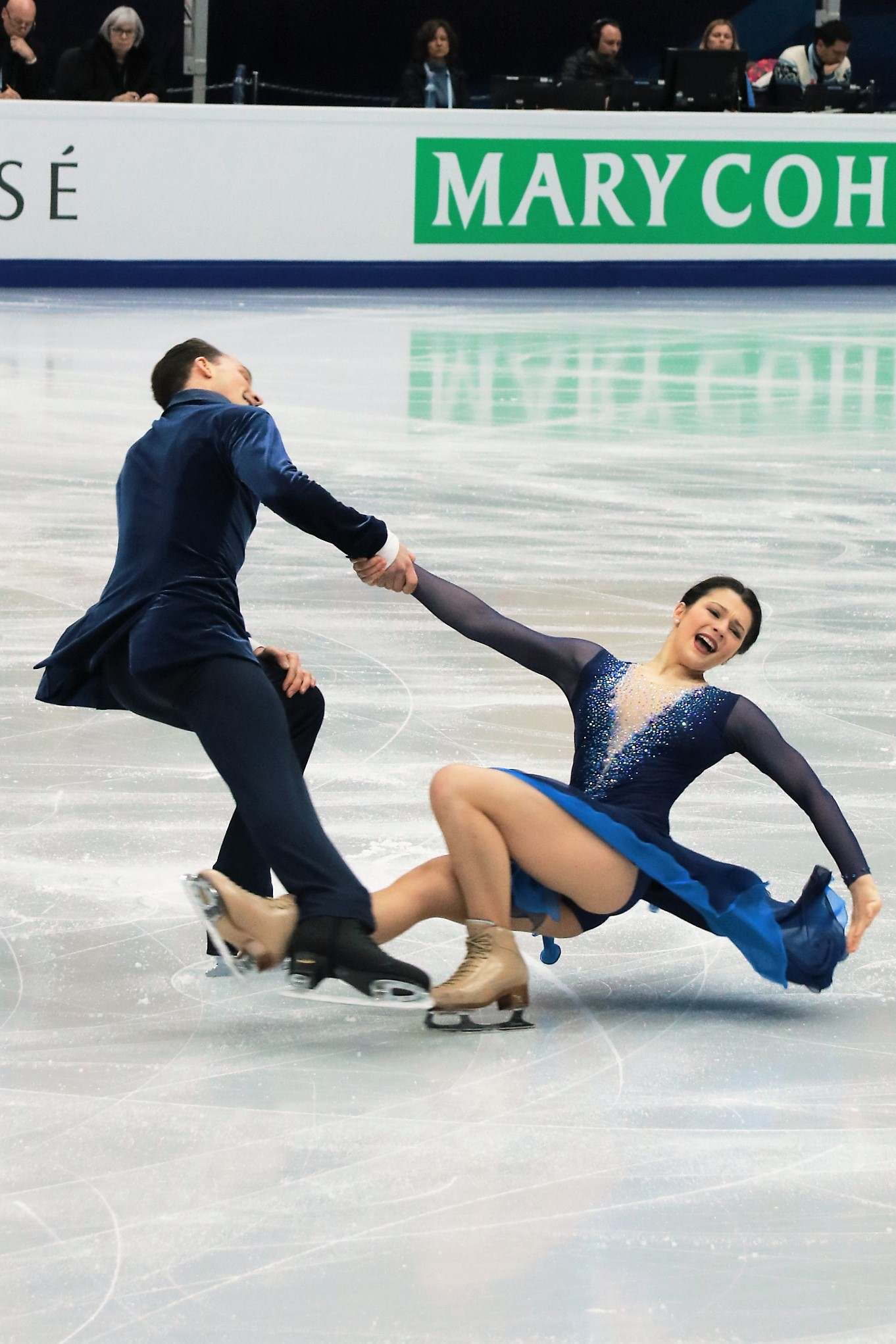
Natalia Kaliszek & Maksym Spodyriev, 2018

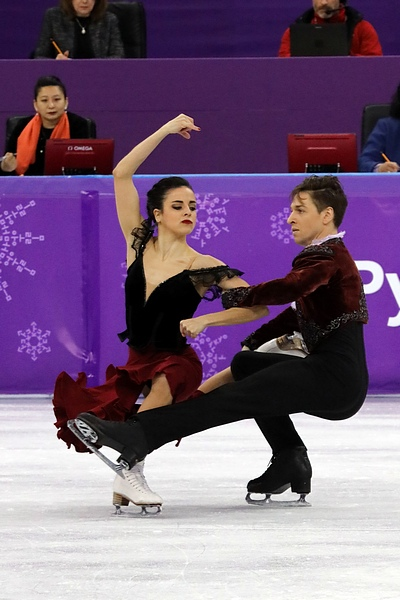
Sara Hurtado & Kirill Khaliavin, 2018

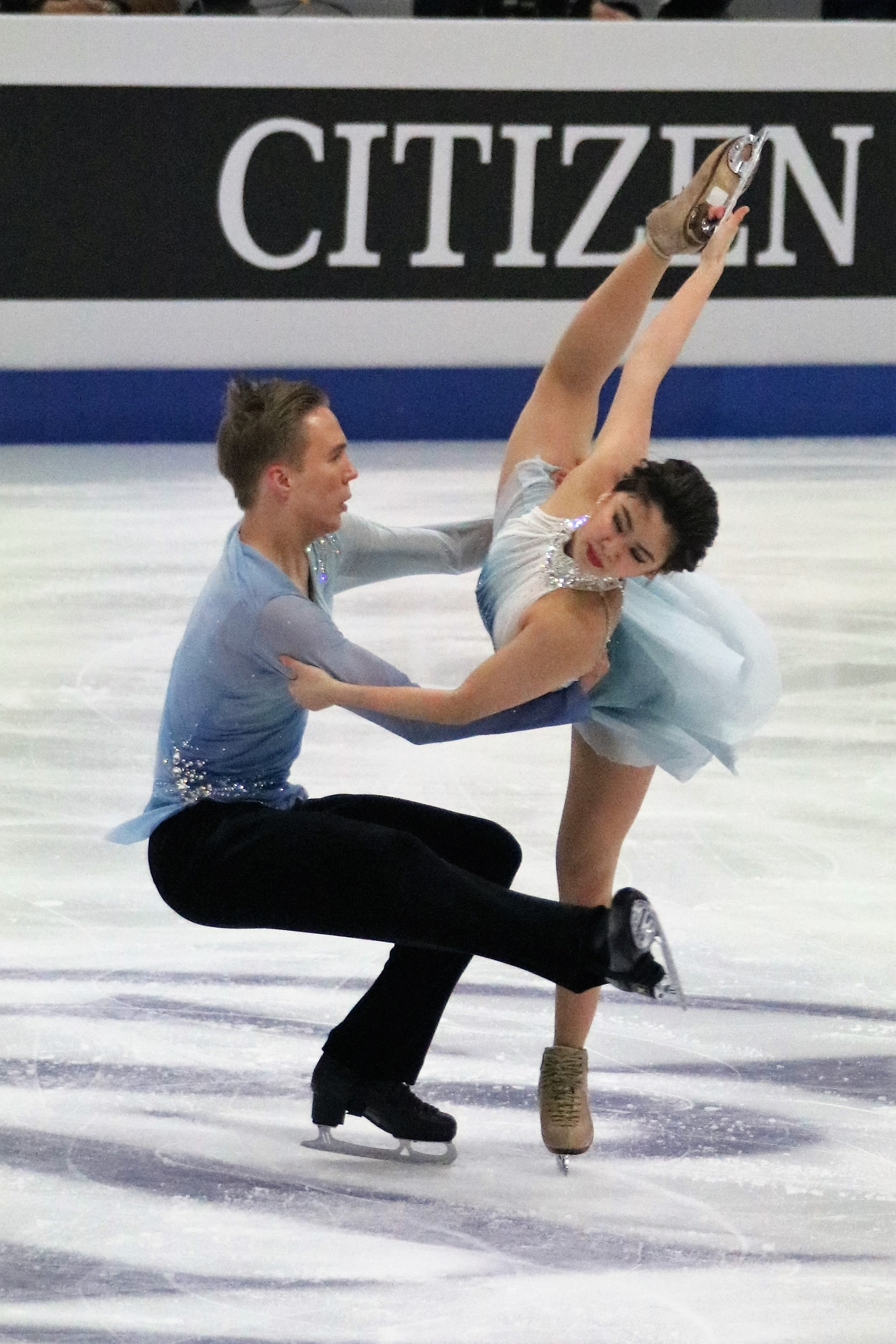
Yuka Orihara & Juho Pirinen, 2020

== Works cited ==
- Cabell, Lee; Bateman, Erica (2018). "Biomechanics in Figure Skating". In Vescovi, Jason D.; VanHeest, Jaci L. (eds.). The Science of Figure Skating. New York: Routledge. pp. 13–34. ISBN 978-1-138-22986-0.
- Hines, James R. (2006). Figure Skating: A History. Urbana, Illinois: University of Illinois Press. ISBN 978-0-252-07286-4.
- "ISU Communication 2769: Single & Pair Skating" (PDF). Lausanne, Switzerland: International Skating Union. 18 March 2026. Archived (PDF) from the original on 21 April 2026.
- "ISU Communication 2788: Single & Pair Skating" (PDF). Lausanne, Switzerland: International Skating Union. 19 March 2026. Archived (PDF) from the original on 24 June 2026.
- "ISU Technical Panel Handbook Pair Skating 2025-2026" (PDF). International Skating Union. 25 July 2025. Archived (PDF) from the original on 12 August 2025.
- Kestnbaum, Ellyn (2003). Culture on Ice: Figure Skating and Cultural Meaning. Middletown, Connecticut: Wesleyan University Press. ISBN 0819566411.
- Petkevich, John Misha (1988). Sports Illustrated Figure Skating: Championship Techniques (1st ed.). New York: Sports Illustrated. ISBN 978-1-4616-6440-6. OCLC 815289537.
- "Special Regulations & Technical Rules – Single & Pair Skating and Ice Dance 2024" (PDF). International Skating Union. June 2024. Archived (PDF) from the original on 9 November 2024.
