= Jan Barták =

Czech ice dancer

Figure skating career
- Country: Czechoslovakia
- Partner: Jana Beránková; Eva Štolfová; Ivana Dírerová
- Skating club: TJ Stadion Brno
- Retired: 1982

Jan Barták is a Czech former ice dancer who represented Czechoslovakia. With Jana Beránková, he is the 1981 Prague Skate champion, the 1981 NHK Trophy bronze medalist, the 1982 Ennia Challenge Cup silver medalist, and a two-time Czechoslovak national champion. The duo finished in the top ten at four ISU Championships — 1981 Europeans in Innsbruck, Austria; 1981 Worlds in Hartford, Connecticut, United States; 1982 Europeans in Lyon, France; and 1982 Worlds in Copenhagen, Denmark.

Beránková/Barták teamed up in 1978 and competed together for four seasons. Earlier in his career, Barták skated with Eva Štolfová and Ivana Dírerová. His skating club was TJ Stadion Brno.

== Competitive highlights ==
=== With Beránková ===
International
Event	1978–79	1979–80	1980–81	1981–82
World Champ.		11th	9th	9th
European Champ.			7th	7th
Ennia Cup				2nd
NHK Trophy		5th		3rd
Prague Skate	5th	5th	2nd	1st
National
Czechoslovak Champ.			1st	1st

=== With Štolfová ===
National
Event	1975–76
Czechoslovak Championships	3rd
