= Jana Zangiová =

Czech ice dancer

Personal information
- Other names: Jana Beránková

Figure skating career
- Country: Czechoslovakia
- Partner: Jan Barták; Karol Foltán
- Retired: 1982

Jana Zangiová, née Beránková, is a former ice dancer who represented Czechoslovakia. With Jan Barták, she is the 1981 Prague Skate champion, the 1981 NHK Trophy bronze medalist, the 1982 Ennia Challenge Cup silver medalist, and a two-time Czechoslovak national champion. The duo finished in the top ten at four ISU Championships — 1981 Europeans in Innsbruck, Austria; 1981 Worlds in Hartford, Connecticut, United States; 1982 Europeans in Lyon, France; and 1982 Worlds in Copenhagen, Denmark.

Beránková/Barták teamed up in 1978 and competed together for four seasons. Earlier in her career, she skated with Karol Foltán. After retiring from skating, she became a notary in Prague. She is married to an ophthalmologist, Imran Musa Zangi, and has a son, Filip.

== Competitive highlights ==
=== With Barták ===
International
| Event | 1978–79 | 1979–80 | 1980–81 | 1981–82 |
|---|---|---|---|---|
| World Champ. | | 11th | 9th | 9th |
| European Champ. | | | 7th | 7th |
| Ennia Cup | | | | 2nd |
| NHK Trophy | | 5th | | 3rd |
| Prague Skate | 5th | 5th | 2nd | 1st |
National
| Czechoslovak Champ. | | | 1st | 1st |

=== With Foltán ===
National
| Event | 1977–78 |
|---|---|
| Czechoslovak Championships | 3rd |
