= Andreas Nischwitz =

West German pair skater (born 1957)

Personal information
- Born: 1 April 1957 (age 69) Leinfelden, Baden-Württemberg, West Germany
- Height: 1.73 m (5 ft 8 in)

Figure skating career
- Country: West Germany
- Skating club: TuS Stuttgart
- Retired: 1981
Medal record
Representing West Germany
Pairs' Figure skating
World Championships
Bronze medal – third place	1981 Hartford	Pairs
European Championships
Silver medal – second place	1981 Innsbruck	Pairs

Andreas Nischwitz (born 1 April 1957) is a former West German pair skater. He was born in Leinfelden, Germany. With partner Susanne Scheibe, he won the gold medal at the German Figure Skating Championships in 1977 and 1978, finishing eighth at both the European Figure Skating Championships and World Figure Skating Championships in both years. He then teamed with Christina Riegel and won the German title three straight years, starting in 1979. They finished eighth at the 1980 Winter Olympics, and the following year, the pair won the silver medal at the European Championships and the bronze at the World Championships.

== Results ==
=== With Scheibe ===
International
Event	1976–77	1977–78
World Championships	8th	8th
European Championships	8th	8th
Nebelhorn Trophy	1st	3rd
International St. Gervais	1st	3rd
National
West German Championships	1st	1st

=== With Riegel ===
International
Event	1979	1980	1981
Winter Olympics		8th	
World Championships	8th	5th	3rd
European Championships	8th	6th	2nd
National
West German Championships	1st	1st	1st
