= Denise Biellmann =

Swiss professional figure skater

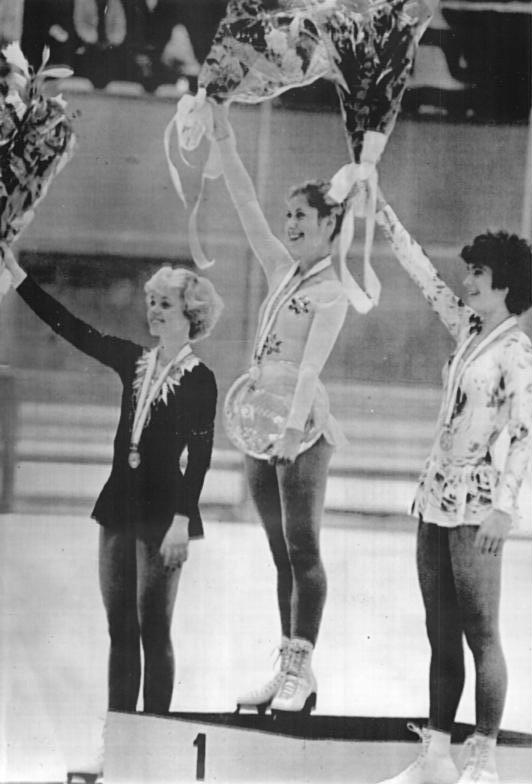
- Biellmann (center) in November 1980

Personal information
- Born: 11 December 1962 (age 63) Zurich, Switzerland
- Height: 1.60 m (5 ft 3 in)

Figure skating career
- Country: Switzerland
- Coach: Heidi Biellmann (mother)
- Retired: 1981 (age 18)
Medal record
Ladies' Figure skating
Representing Switzerland
World Championships
Gold medal – first place	1981 Hartford	Ladies' singles
European Championships
Gold medal – first place	1981 Innsbruck	Ladies' singles
Bronze medal – third place	1979 Zagreb	Ladies' singles

Denise Biellmann (born 11 December 1962) is a Swiss professional figure skater. She was the European and World Champion in 1981 and won the Swiss Championships three times.

== Career ==
=== Amateur career ===
Born in Zurich, Biellmann won her first international championship in Belgium at age 8; and, at age 11, she won the Swiss Junior Figure Skating Championships. At age 14, she competed at the 1977 European Championships and placed second in the Free Skate portion of the competition.

At the 1978 Ennia Challenge Cup, Biellmann, winner of the women's event, had her name given to a new strain of tulip, and a bouquet of her namesake tulips was presented to her by Queen Juliana of the Netherlands.

At the age of 15, she was the second female skater to land the triple Lutz jump in competition, after Jill Sawyer, which she performed for the first time at the 1978 European Championships. At the same event, she became the first woman to receive a 6.0 in Technical Merit, receiving the score from British judge Pauline Borrajo. She came in 12th place in compulsory figures, first in the free skate, and finished in fourth place overall. She won the bronze medal at the 1979 European Championships.

At the 1980 Winter Olympics in Lake Placid, Biellmann again performed poorly in compulsory figures and was in twelfth place. She was second in the short program and won the free skate to finish fourth overall. She won the gold medal at the 1981 European Championships and another gold medal at 1981 Worlds.

The Biellmann spin was named after her; she popularized and perfected the spin, but did not invent it. It was present in skating at least since the 1965 European Championships when Tamara Moskvina performed it. It remains the only figure skating spin to be officially named after a person in ISU regulations.

According to figure skating historian James R. Hines, Biellmann's forte was the more athletic aspects of the free skating program, including "outstanding jumps and fast spins". Biellmann retired from amateur competition at age 18, shortly after her win at the 1981 World Championships.

=== Professional career ===
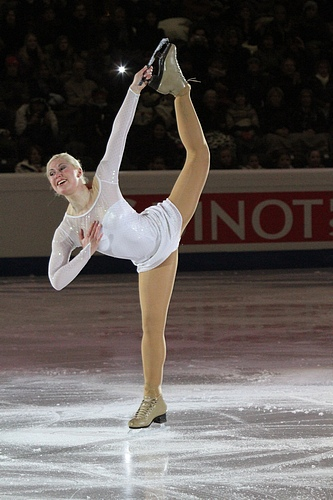
Biellmann performing the Biellmann spin in 2011

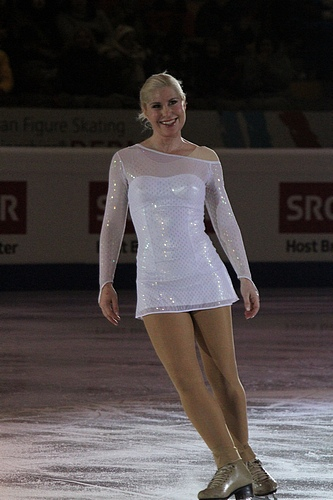
Biellmann performing in the gala at the 2011 European Championships

Biellmann remains involved in the international figure skating community as a participant in both professional shows, including tours with Holiday on Ice, and competitions. She participated in Pro7 Season 1, partnered with television presenter Pierre Geisensetter, and in Season 2, partnered with actor Patrick Bach.

She participated in the Eurovision Dance Contest 2007 representing Switzerland with partner Sven Ninnemann.

She won the Challenge of Champions, regarded as the most important professional event, five times. In 2014, Biellmann was inducted into the World Figure Skating Hall of Fame.

== Competitive highlights ==
International
Event	72–73	73–74	74–75	75–76	76–77	77–78	78–79	79–80	80–81
Winter Olympics								4th	
World Champ.				15th	10th	5th	5th	6th	1st
European Champ.					6th	4th	3rd	WD	1st
NHK Trophy									1st
Richmond Trophy						3rd			
St. Gervais					2nd		1st		
International Challenge Cup							1st		
National
Swiss Champ.	5th J	1st J	11th	3rd	2nd	2nd	1st	1st	1st
J = Junior level; WD = Withdrew

== Book ==
- Denise Biellmann – Die Biografie. Cameo, Bern 2022, ISBN 978-3-03951-011-5.

Awards
Preceded by (Switzerland) Cornelia Bürki	Swiss Sportswoman of the Year; 1979	Succeeded by (Switzerland) Ruth Keller
Preceded by (Switzerland) Ruth Keller	Swiss Sportswoman of the Year; 1981	Succeeded by (Switzerland) Erika Hess
