= Leonardo Azzola =

German figure skater

Personal information
- Full name: Leonardo-Christian Azzola
- Born: 8 June 1959 (age 67) Cluj-Napoca, Romania
- Height: 1.71 m (5 ft 7 1/2 in)

Figure skating career
- Country: West Germany
- Partner: Claudia Massari
- Skating club: TuS Stuttgart
- Retired: c. 1984

Leonardo-Christian Azzola (born 8 June 1959) is a German former competitive figure skater. Competing in pair skating with Claudia Massari, he won two national titles and represented West Germany at the 1984 Winter Olympics. He is the 1982 Nebelhorn Trophy champion in men's singles.

== Life and career ==
Leonardo-Christian Azzola was born in Cluj-Napoca, Romania. As a competitor in men's singles, he won gold at the 1982 Nebelhorn Trophy.

The following season, Azzola began a pair skating partnership with Claudia Massari. The two won the West German national title in their first season together. They placed seventh at the 1983 European Championships in Dortmund and 16th at the 1983 World Championships in Helsinki.

In their second and final season together, Massari/Azzola repeated as national champions. They placed eighth at the 1983 European Championships in Budapest, and then 13th at the 1984 Winter Olympics in Sarajevo. They withdrew from the 1984 World Championships after the short program, due to Massari's recurring knee problem.

After retiring from competition, Azzola worked as a dentist and skating choreographer.

== Competitive highlights ==
=== Pairs with Massari ===
International
Event	1982–83	1983–84
Olympics		13th
World Championships	16th	WD
European Championships	7th	8th
National
West Germany	1st	1st
WD = Withdrew

=== Men's singles ===
International
Event	1977–78	1982–83
Nebelhorn Trophy		1st
Prague Skate	9th	
