= Jayne Torvill =

English ice skater (born 1957)

Dame Jayne Torvill DBE
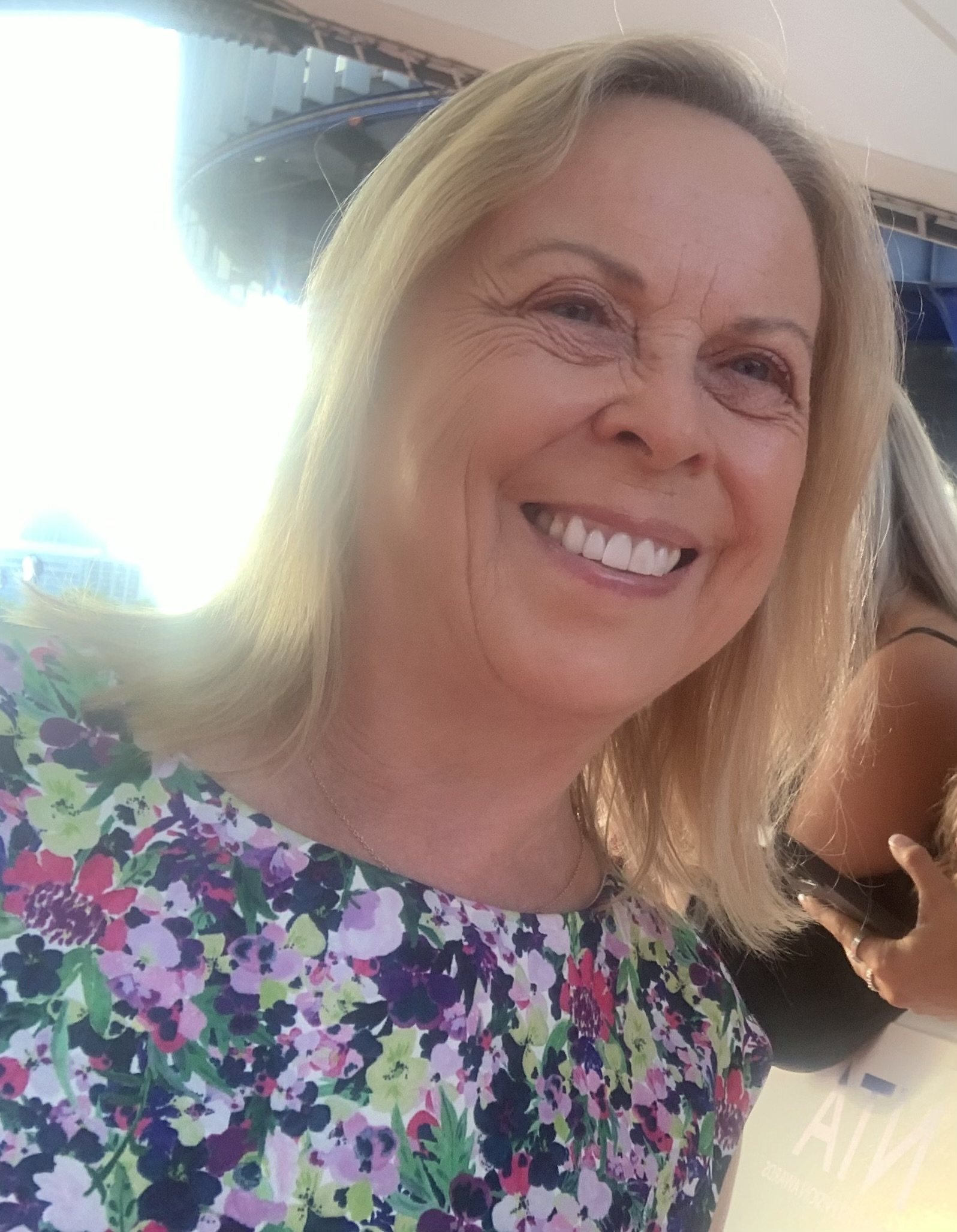
- Torvill in 2023

Personal information
- Born: Jayne Torvill; 7 October 1957 (age 68) Clifton, Nottingham, England
- Height: 5 ft 2.5 in (1.59 m)

Figure skating career
- Country: Great Britain
- Retired: 1984, 1994
Medal record
Figure skating
Ice dancing
Representing Great Britain
Olympic Games
Bronze medal – third place	1994 Lillehammer	Ice dancing
Gold medal – first place	1984 Sarajevo	Ice dancing
World Championships
Gold medal – first place	1984 Ottawa	Ice dancing
Gold medal – first place	1983 Helsinki	Ice dancing
Gold medal – first place	1982 Copenhagen	Ice dancing
Gold medal – first place	1981 Hartford	Ice dancing
European Championships
Gold medal – first place	1994 Copenhagen	Ice dancing
Gold medal – first place	1984 Budapest	Ice dancing
Gold medal – first place	1982 Lyon	Ice dancing
Gold medal – first place	1981 Innsbruck	Ice dancing

Dame Jayne Christensen (née Torvill; born 7 October 1957) is a British professional ice dancer and former competitor. She and her skating partner Christopher Dean are considered amongst the greatest ice dancers of all time. The pair won a gold medal at the 1984 Winter Olympics, as well as a bronze medal at the 1994 Winter Olympics, becoming one of the oldest figure skating Olympic medalists. They were also four-time world and European champions and seven-time British champions.

== Early life ==
Torvill was born in Clifton, Nottingham, England, and grew up in Nottingham. She attended Clifton Hall Girls' Grammar School and worked in the city as an insurance clerk at Norwich Union.

== Ice dance career ==
She became captivated by ice skating at age 8 following an after-school trip to the local ice rink. In 1971, at age 14, Torvill won gold at the British Pairs Figure Skating Championship with her then-partner Michael Hutchinson. They also took silver in 1970 and 1972.

After parting from Hutchinson, Torvill continued to skate on her own for a while before deciding to team up with Christopher Dean in 1975. On placing 5th in the 1980 Winter Olympics at Lake Placid, New York, Dean gave up his job as a policeman and Torvill gave up hers as an insurance clerk to skate together full-time.

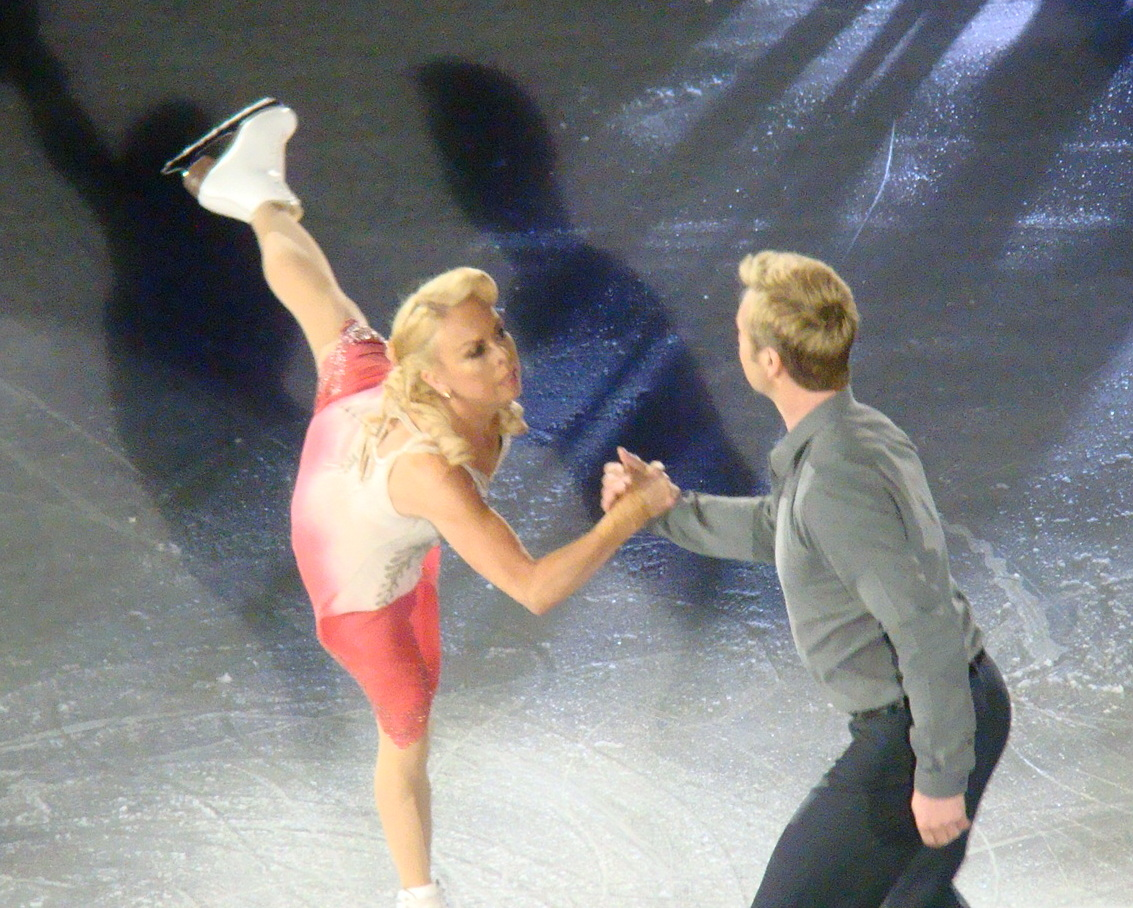
Torvill and Dean performing in 2011

Torvill and Dean's free programme at the 1984 Sarajevo Winter Olympics was performed to the music of Maurice Ravel's Boléro, which had to be cut down from 17 minutes to just 4 minutes. They received twelve perfect 6.0 marks, one of five occasions they were awarded all perfect scores for artistic impression. It was one of the most popular achievements in the history of British sport, watched by a British television audience of 24 million people. Since the time limit was four minutes and ten seconds and their music was four minutes 28 seconds, they began on their knees and moved their bodies to the music for 18 seconds before starting to skate.

Torvill and Dean turned professional after their 1984 Olympic win and under then-existing Olympic Committee rules their professional status made them ineligible to compete in the Olympics again. However, in 1993, the International Skating Union relaxed the rules for professional skaters, allowing the pair to participate in the 1994 Winter Olympics in Lillehammer where they won a bronze medal. Torvill took a seven-year break from skating from 1998 to 2005.

From January 2006 to March 2025, she and Dean participated in the ITV show Dancing on Ice as "judges". Each season, the show runs from January to March and then goes on tour to arenas across the United Kingdom. In November 2011, Torvill said, "the standard each year has gotten higher and higher, which is exciting for us – to think what we can achieve with people who have never skated or are relatively unknown to skating." Dancing on Ice ended on ITV after 19 years due to a drop in ratings.

Torvill and Dean were ambassadors for the 2012 European Figure Skating Championships in Sheffield, England. In February 2014, Torvill and Dean visited Sarajevo for the 30th anniversary of the 1984 Olympics, and recreated their Bolero routine in the same arena where they won the gold.

== Personal life ==
Torvill married Phil Christensen in 1990, and they are parents of two adopted children.

== Honours ==
She was appointed a Member of the Order of the British Empire (MBE) in the 1981 New Year Honours for services to ice dancing, promoted to Officer of the Order of the British Empire (OBE) in the 2000 New Year Honours for services to ice skating, and appointed Dame Commander of the Order of the British Empire (DBE) in the 2026 New Year Honours for services to Ice Skating and to Voluntary Service.

In 1993, she and Dean were awarded Honorary Master of Arts degrees by Nottingham Trent University for services to ice dance and their contribution to its development as a creative art.

== Competitive results ==
=== Pair skating with Hutchinson ===
International
Event	1971	1972	1973
European Championships		18th	
National
British Championships	2nd	1st	2nd

=== Amateur results with Dean ===
Event	75–76	76–77	77–78	78–79	79–80	80–81	81–82	82–83	83–84	93–94
Olympics					5th				1st	3rd
Worlds			11th	8th	4th	1st	1st	1st	1st	
Europeans			9th	6th	4th	1st	1st	WD	1st	1st
British Championships		4th	3rd	1st	1st	1st	1st	1st	1st	1st
NHK Trophy					2nd					
St Ivel International						1st	1st			
Oberstdorf		2nd	1st							
St Gervais		1st								
Morzine Trophy				2nd						
John Davis Trophy			1st							
Sheffield Trophy		1st								
Rotary Watches Competition				2nd						
Northern Championships	1st									
WD: Withdrew

=== Professional results with Dean ===
Event	1984	1985	1990	1994	1995	1996
World Professional Championships	1st	1st	1st		1st	1st
Challenge of Champions			1st		1st	1st
World Team Championship				3rd	1st	1st

== Professional programmes ==
	1984	1985	1990	1994	1995	1996
World Professional Championships	Song of India, Encounter	Diablo Tango, Venus	Oscar Tango, Revolution / Imagine	Encounter	Still Crazy After All These Years, Cecilia	Take Five, Hat Trick
Challenge of Champions			Echoes of Ireland		Still Crazy After All These Years, Cecilia	Take Five, Hat Trick
World Team Championships				Let's Face the Music, Encounter	Bridge Over Troubled Water, Cecilia	Sarabande, Hat Trick

== Amateur programmes ==
	OSP/ORD	Free Dance	Exhibitions
1978		The Great Waldo Pepper	
1979	Masquerade	Slaughter on Tenth Avenue	Evergreen
1980	A Little Street in Singapore	Sing Sing Sing etc.	Puttin' On the Ritz
1981	Cherry Pink (and Apple Blossom White)	Fame etc.	History of Love (version 1)
1982	Summertime	Mack and Mabel	The Hop, Kiss Me Kate, Fast Tap
1983	Rock n Roll	Barnum	Putting on the Ritz
1984	Paso Doble	Boléro	I Won't Send Roses
1994	History of Love (version 2)	Let's Face the Music	Boléro

== In popular culture ==
Torvill was portrayed by Poppy Lee Friar in the 2018 biopic Torvill & Dean.

== See also ==
- Torvill and Dean
