= Christina Riegel =

German figure skater

Personal information
- Born: August 25, 1965 (age 60) Stuttgart, Baden-Württemberg, West Germany
- Height: 1.50 m (4 ft 11 in)

Figure skating career
- Country: West Germany
- Retired: 1981
Medal record
Pairs' Figure skating
Representing West Germany
World Championships
Bronze medal – third place	1981 Hartford	Pairs
European Championships
Silver medal – second place	1981 Innsbruck	Pairs

Christina "Tina" Riegel (born 25 August 1965 in Stuttgart, Germany) is a former German figure skater who competed in pair skating and ladies singles at the 1980 Winter Olympics.

With partner Andreas Nischwitz, Riegel won the gold medal at the German Figure Skating Championships three straight years, beginning in 1979. They finished eighth at the 1980 Olympics, when Riegel was just 14 years old, and the following year, the pair won the silver medal at the European Figure Skating Championships and the bronze at the World Figure Skating Championships.

Riegel also won the bronze medal at the German Nationals in ladies singles in 1980 and 1981. She finished 18th at the 1980 Olympics and 19th at that year's World Championships.

== Results ==
=== Single skating ===
International
Event	1980	1981
Winter Olympics	18th	
World Championships	19th	
European Championships	WD	
National
West German Championships	3rd	3rd
WD = Withdrew

=== Pair skating with Nischwitz ===
International
Event	1979	1980	1981
Winter Olympics		8th	
World Championships	8th	5th	3rd
European Championships	8th	6th	2nd
National
West German Championships	1st	1st	1st
