= Bao Zhenhua =

Chinese figure skater

Personal information
- Full name: 包振华
- Nationality: Chinese
- Born: 8 June 1965 (age 59); Jilin, China
- Occupation: Figure skating coach

Sport
- Sport: Figure skating

Bao Zhenhua (Chinese: 包振华, born 8 June 1965) is a Chinese figure skater. She competed at the 1980 Winter Olympics and the 1984 Winter Olympics. She became a figure skating coach after studying at University of Teacher Education Fukuoka in the 1990s, and spent her coach career in Fuzhou and Shenzhen in the 2010s.
