= Rudi Cerne =

German television presenter and former figure skater

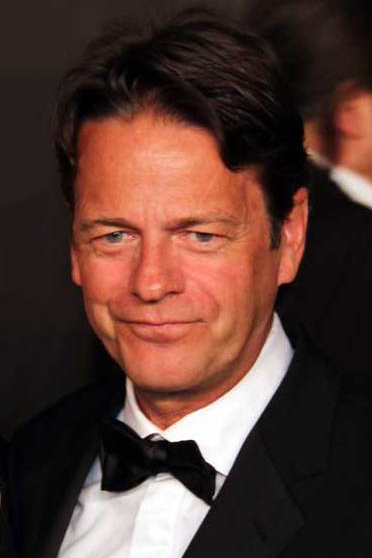
- Cerne in 2012

Personal information
- Born: 26 September 1958 (age 68) Wanne-Eickel, West Germany

Figure skating career
- Country: West Germany
Medal record
Representing West Germany
Men's Figure skating
European Championships
Silver medal – second place	1984 Budapest	Men's singles

Rudi Cerne (born 26 September 1958) is a German TV presenter and former figure skater. He is the 1984 European silver medalist and a two-time West German national champion. He competed at two Winter Olympics, finishing fourth in 1984.

== Personal life ==
Cerne was born on 26 September 1958 in Wanne-Eickel, West Germany. His father was a figure skater.

In 1987, Cerne married his wife Christiane, with whom he has a daughter.

== Career ==
=== Figure skating ===
When he was six years old, Cerne was introduced to ice skating by his father, a former ice skater who had lost a leg in the war. His skating club was Herner EV in Herne, Germany. He was coached by Günter Zöller and was a member of West Germany's national team in the late 1970s and early 1980s. His domestic rivals included Norbert Schramm and Heiko Fischer. He was most known for his elegant style, which emulated that of John Curry, and his strong edging.

Cerne won the German Figure Skating Championships in 1978 and 1980. Then, in 1981, a younger teammate, Norbert Schramm, emerged and went on to dominate not only the German Nationals but also various international competitions. Schramm won two consecutive world silver medals in 1982 and 1983 while Cerne could barely place in the top dozen, which prompted many to conclude that Cerne's career as the top West German male skater was over.

In 1984, however, 26-year-old Cerne entered the scene with a new attitude and consistent triple jumps due to intensive training. Most notably, Cerne had mastered the triple Lutz jump, which he needed in order to be technically competitive with Schramm as well as other top skaters.

Cerne received the bronze medal at the German Championships during his final two seasons, 1982–83 and 1983–84, but won silver at the 1984 European Championships in Budapest, Hungary, behind Alexandr Fadeev of the Soviet Union. He went on to finish 4th at the 1984 Winter Olympics in Sarajevo, Yugoslavia, having ranked third in the compulsory figures, sixth in the short program, and fourth in the free skate. After placing fifth at the 1984 World Championships, Cerne turned professional and skated with "Holiday on Ice". He also became a figure skating coach.

=== Television ===
After ending his figure skating career, Cerne became a TV journalist, working initially for the German public TV station ARD, presenting sport shows from 1992 onwards. In 1996, he joined ZDF, Germany's other public broadcaster. He also presents Aktenzeichen XY… ungelöst, a show about unresolved crimes, since 2002.

== Results ==
=== 1976–1984 ===
Event	76–77	77–78	78–79	79–80	80–81	81–82	82–83	83–84
Winter Olympics				13th				4th
World Championships		14th		11th		15th	10th	5th
European Championships		7th		WD		4th	7th	2nd
Skate America								2nd
NHK Trophy							6th	
Nebelhorn Trophy	3rd				3rd			
St. Gervais		3rd		1st				
German Championships	4th	1st		1st	2nd	2nd	3rd	3rd

=== 1969–1976 ===
Event	69–70	70–71	71–72	72–73	73–74	74–75	75–76
Prague Skate					9th		
German Championships	1st J	1st S	4th	4th	5th	6th	4th
