= Bruno Delmaestro =

Personal information
- Born: June 22, 1963 (age 63)

Figure skating career
- Country: Italy
- Retired: c. 1983

Bruno Delmaestro (born 22 June 1963) is an Italian-Canadian figure skating coach and former competitor. He is the 1982 Nebelhorn Trophy silver medalist, the 1982 Grand Prix International St. Gervais bronze medalist, and a three-time Italian national champion. He competed at four European Championships and the 1982 World Championships.

Delmaestro is a longtime coach at the Coquitlam Skating Club in Coquitlam, British Columbia, Canada. He coached Hong Kong's Ronald Lam throughout Lam's entire career.

His daughter, Brianna, was born in November 1995 in Burnaby and competed for Canada in ice dancing.

== Competitive highlights ==
International
Event	1979–80	1980–81	1981–82	1982–83
World Champ.			23rd	
European Champ.	14th	18th	14th	17th
Nebelhorn Trophy				2nd
St. Gervais				3rd
National
Italian Champ.		1st	1st	1st
