= Heiko Fischer =

German figure skater (1960–1989)

Personal information
- Born: 25 February 1960 Stuttgart, West Germany
- Died: 21 November 1989 (aged 29) Sindelfingen, West Germany
- Height: 1.89 m (6 ft 2 1/2 in)

Figure skating career
- Country: West Germany
- Retired: 1988

Heiko Fischer (25 February 1960 — 21 November 1989) was a German figure skater who competed for West Germany. He was the 1982 Skate America silver medalist, 1982 Skate Canada bronze medalist, a two-time Nebelhorn Trophy champion, a five-time German national champion, and competed at two Winter Olympics.

== Life and career ==
Heiko Fischer won the German Championships in 1982, 1983, 1985, 1986, and 1988. He trained under Karel Fajfr and represented the TUS Stuttgart club nationally. During his career, he beat Norbert Schramm and Rudi Cerne on the national level.

He collapsed during a game of squash with friends on 21 November 1989. He died of chronic myocarditis (inflammation of the heart muscle) at the age of 29 in Sindelfingen hospital. His wife, Angela, was seven months pregnant when he died, giving birth to their son in 1990.

As a tribute to him, the Heiko Fischer Cup (also Heiko Fischer Pokal) has been held in Stuttgart since 1991.

== Results ==
International
Event	78–79	79–80	80–81	81–82	82–83	83–84	84–85	85–86	86–87	87–88
Olympics						10th				9th
Worlds					8th	7th	6th	7th		7th
Europeans				6th	4th	5th	4th	WD		6th
Skate America					2nd				5th	
Skate Canada					3rd					
NHK Trophy			7th							
Golden Spin								1st		
Nebelhorn				1st		1st				
Prague Skate										2nd
St. Gervais				1st						
National
West German	3rd	3rd	3rd	1st	1st	2nd	1st	1st		1st
