= Stephen Williams (figure skater) =

British ice dancer

Stephen Gordon Williams (born 23 May 1960 in Birmingham) is a British ice dancer. He won the 1980 Nebelhorn Trophy with partner Wendy Sessions. He was the first coach of Kaitlyn Weaver.

Williams competed with Wendy Sessions for Great Britain in ice dance at the 1984 Winter Olympics.

== Results ==
(with Wendy Sessions)

Event	1980-1981	1981-1982	1982-1983	1983-1984
Olympic Winter Games				11th
World Championships	11th	13th	12th	12th
European Championships	9th	9th	7th	7th
British Championships	3rd	3rd	3rd	2nd
Skate America				3rd
Skate Canada International				2nd
NHK Trophy			3rd	
Nebelhorn Trophy	1st			
