= Wendy Sessions =

British ice dancer

Wendy Sessions (born 3 January 1959 in Birmingham) is a British ice dancer. She won the 1977 World Junior Figure Skating Championships with partner Mark Reed. She won the 1980 Nebelhorn Trophy with partner Stephen Williams.

Sessions competed with Stephen Williams for Great Britain in ice dance at the 1984 Winter Olympics.

== Results ==
(with Stephen Williams, except World Juniors with Mark Reed)

International
Event	1976–1977	1980-1981	1981-1982	1982-1983	1983-1984
Olympic Winter Games					11th
World Championships		11th	13th	12th	12th
European Championships		9th	9th	7th	7th
Skate America					3rd
Skate Canada International					2nd
NHK Trophy				3rd	
St. Ivel International			3rd		3rd
Nebelhorn Trophy		1st			
National
British Championships		3rd	3rd	3rd	2nd
International: Junior
World Junior Championships	1st				
