= 1984 World Figure Skating Championships =

Annual figure skating competition held in 1984

- Type: ISU Championship
- Date: March 20 – 25
- Season: 1983–84
- Location: Ottawa, Canada
- Venue: Ottawa Civic Centre

Champions
- Men's singles: (United States) Scott Hamilton
- Ladies' singles: (East Germany) Katarina Witt
- Pairs: (Canada) Barbara Underhill / Paul Martini
- Ice dance: (United Kingdom) Jayne Torvill / Christopher Dean
- Previous: 1983 World Championships
- Next: 1985 World Championships

The 1984 World Figure Skating Championships were held at the Ottawa Civic Centre in Ottawa, Canada from March 20 to 25. At the event, sanctioned by the International Skating Union, medals were awarded in men's singles, ladies' singles, pair skating, and ice dancing.

The ISU Representative was Olaf Poulsen (Norway), and the ISU Technical Delegate was Elemér Terták (Hungary).

== Medal tables ==
=== Medalists ===
Discipline	Gold	Silver	Bronze
Men	(United States) Scott Hamilton	(Canada) Brian Orser	(Soviet Union) Alexander Fadeev
Ladies	(East Germany) Katarina Witt	(Soviet Union) Anna Kondrashova	(United States) Elaine Zayak
Pair skating	(Canada) Barbara Underhill / Paul Martini	(Soviet Union) Elena Valova / Oleg Vasiliev	(East Germany) Sabine Baeß / Tassilo Thierbach
Ice dancing	(United Kingdom) Jayne Torvill / Christopher Dean	(Soviet Union) Natalia Bestemianova / Andrei Bukin	(United States) Judy Blumberg / Michael Seibert

=== Medals by country ===
Rank	Nation	Gold	Silver	Bronze	Total
1	Canada (CAN)	1	1	0	2
2	United States (USA)	1	0	2	3
3	East Germany (GDR)	1	0	1	2
4	Great Britain (GBR)	1	0	0	1
5	Soviet Union (URS)	0	3	1	4
Totals (5 entries)		4	4	4	12

== Results ==
=== Men ===
Rank	Name	Nation	CP	SP	FS	SP+FS	Points	Total
1	Scott Hamilton	United States	1	1	2	2		3.0
2	Brian Orser	Canada	7	2	1	1		6.0
3	Alexander Fadeev	Soviet Union	5	3	3	3		7.2
4	Jozef Sabovčík	Czechoslovakia	4	4	4	4		8.0
5	Rudi Cerne	West Germany	2	5	5	5		8.2
6	Brian Boitano	United States	6	6	7	7		13.0
7	Heiko Fischer	West Germany	3	8	9	9		14.0
8	Vladimir Kotin	Soviet Union	9	7	6	6		14.2
9	Gordon Forbes	Canada	10	9	8	8		17.6
10	Gary Beacom	Canada	11	10	10	10		20.6
11	Grzegorz Filipowski	Poland	12	12	12	11		24.0
12	Fernand Fédronic	France	8	11	15	14		24.2
13	Mark Cockerell	United States	13	13	13	13		26.0
14	Masaru Ogawa	Japan	16	16	11	12		27.0
15	Didier Monge	France	14	14	14	15		28.0
B Section
16	Petr Barna	Czechoslovakia	17	15	1	1		17.2
17	Thomas Hlavik	Austria	15	20	2	2		19.0
18	Alessandro Riccitelli	Italy	19	19	3	3		22.0
19	Miljan Begović	Yugoslavia	18	17	5	4		22.6
20	Paul Robinson	Great Britain	22	21	4	5		25.6
21	András Száraz	Hungary	20	22	6	7		26.8
22	Perry Meek	Australia	23	18	7	6		28.0
23	Lars Dresler	Denmark	21	24	8	8		30.2
24	Fernando Soria	Spain	24	23	9	9		32.6
25	Cho Jae-hyung	South Korea	25	25	10	10		35.0
WD	Norbert Schramm	West Germany						

Referee:

- Sonia Bianchettei Italy

Assistant Referee:

- Martin Felsenreich Austria

Judges:

- Linda Petersen Denmark
- Maria Zuchowicz Poland
- Thérèse Maisel France
- Vladimir Amšel Yugoslavia
- Margaret Berezowski Canada
- Eva von Gamm West Germany
- Walter Hütter Austria
- Vanessa Riley Great Britain
- Joan Gruber United States

Substitute judge:

- Kazuo Ohashi Japan

=== Ladies ===
Rank	Name	Nation	CP	SP	FS	SP+FS	Points	Total
1	Katarina Witt	East Germany	1	1	1	1		2.0
2	Anna Kondrashova	Soviet Union	4	2	3	2		6.2
3	Elaine Zayak	United States	9	5	2	3		9.4
4	Kira Ivanova	Soviet Union	2	3	7	6		9.4
5	Kay Thomson	Canada	7	6	5	5		11.6
6	Manuela Ruben	West Germany	3	7	8	8		12.6
7	Midori Ito	Japan	16	4	4	4		15.2
8	Elizabeth Manley	Canada	13	9	6	7		17.4
9	Sanda Dubravčić	Yugoslavia	6	11	10	10		18.0
10	Sandra Cariboni	Switzerland	5	14	15	15		23.6
11	Myriam Oberwiler	Switzerland	17	10	11	11		25.2
12	Susan Jackson	Great Britain	15	8	13	12		25.2
13	Karin Telser	Italy	10	15	14	14		26.0
14	Constanze Gensel	East Germany	20	13	9	9		26.2
15	Katrien Pauwels	Belgium	12	16	16	16		29.6
16	Parthena Sarafidis	Austria	8	17	19	19		30.6
17	Agnès Gosselin	France	19	20	12	13		31.4
18	Cornelia Tesch	West Germany	11	12	20	18		31.4
19	Elise Ahonen	Finland	18	18	17	17		35.0
20	Susanna Peltola	Finland	14	19	21	21		37.0
21	Tamara Téglássy	Hungary	21	22	18	20		39.4
22	Diana Zovko	Australia	23	21	22	22		44.2
23	Kim Hyi-sung	South Korea	22	23	23	23		45.4

Referee:

- Josef Dědič Czechoslovakia

Assistant Referee:

- Benjamin T. Wright United States

Judges:

- Ludwig Gassner Austria
- Marie Lundmark Finland
- Giovanni De Mori Italy
- Shirley Taylor Australia
- Jürg Badraun Switzerland
- Charles U. Foster United States
- Alexandr Vedenin Soviet Union
- Elfriede Beyer West Germany
- Radovan Lipovšćak Yugoslavia

Substitute judge:

- Reinhard Mirmseker East Germany

=== Pairs ===
Olympic champions Valova / Vasiliev led after the short program, followed by Underhill / Martini and Selezneva / Makarov. Underhill / Martini placed first in the free skating and won Canada's first world figure skating title since Karen Magnussen in 1973.

Two pairs withdrew before the free skating – Massari / Azzola, due to Massari's recurring knee problem, and Watson / Lancon, due to Lancon's back injury from a fall in the short program.

Rank	Name	Nation	SP	FS	Points	Total
1	Barbara Underhill / Paul Martini	Canada	2	1		1.8
2	Elena Valova / Oleg Vasiliev	Soviet Union	1	2		2.4
3	Sabine Baeß / Tassilo Thierbach	East Germany	4	3		4.6
4	Larisa Selezneva / Oleg Makarov	Soviet Union	3	4		5.2
5	Katherina Matousek / Lloyd Eisler	Canada	5	5		7.0
6	Birgit Lorenz / Knut Schubert	East Germany	8	6		9.2
7	Cynthia Coull / Mark Rowsom	Canada	7	7		9.8
8	Veronika Pershina / Marat Akbarov	Soviet Union	6	8		10.4
9	Babette Preußler / Tobias Schröter	East Germany	11	9		13.4
10	Lea Ann Miller / William Fauver	United States	9	10		13.6
WD	Claudia Massari / Leonardo Azzola	West Germany	10			
WD	Jill Watson / Burt Lancon	United States	12			

Referee:

- Donald H. Gilchrist Canada

Assistant referee:

- Erika Schiechtl West Germany

Judges:

- Claire Ferguson United States
- Peter Moser Switzerland
- Sally-Anne Stapleford Great Britain
- Mikhail Drei Soviet Union
- Frances Dafoe Canada
- Junko Hiramatsu Japan
- Gerhardt Bubnik Czechoslovakia
- Günter Teichmann East Germany
- Eugen Romminger West Germany

Substitute judge:

- Mária Veres Hungary

=== Ice dancing ===
Rank	Name	Nation	CD	OD	FD	Total
1	Jayne Torvill / Christopher Dean	Great Britain	1	1	1	2.0
2	Natalia Bestemianova / Andrei Bukin	Soviet Union	2	3	2	4.4
3	Judy Blumberg / Michael Seibert	United States	3	2	3	5.6
4	Marina Klimova / Sergei Ponomarenko	Soviet Union	4	4	4	8.0
5	Karen Barber / Nicholas Slater	Great Britain	5	5	5	10.0
6	Tracy Wilson / Robert McCall	Canada	6	8	6	12.8
7	Elena Batanova / Alexei Soloviev	Soviet Union	7	7	7	14.0
8	Carol Fox / Richard Dalley	United States	8	6	7	14.2
9	Petra Born / Rainer Schönborn	West Germany	9	9	9	18.0
10	Elisa Spitz / Scott Gregory	United States	10	11	10	20.4
11	Kelly Johnson / John Thomas	Canada	12	10	11	22.2
12	Wendy Sessions / Stephen Williams	Great Britain	11	12	12	23.4
13	Isabella Micheli / Roberto Pelizzola	Italy	13	13	13	26.0
14	Marianne van Bommel / Wayne Deweyert	Netherlands	14	14	14	28.0
15	Antonia Becherer / Ferdinand Becherer	West Germany	15	15	15	30.0
16	Kathrin Beck / Christoff Beck	Austria	16	16	16	32.0
17	Noriko Sato / Tadayuki Takahashi	Japan	17	17	17	34.0
18	Klára Engi / Attila Tóth	Hungary	18	18	18	36.0
19	Salome Brunner / Markus Merz	Switzerland	20	19	19	38.6
20	Martine Olivier / Philippe Boissier	France	19	20	20	39.4
21	Liane Telling / Michael Fisher	Australia	21	21	21	42.0

Referee:

- Wolfgang Kunz West Germany

Assistant referee:

- Joyce Hisey Canada

Judges:

- Ludwig Gassner Austria
- Irina Absaliamova Soviet Union
- Katalin Alpern Hungary
- Vinicio Toncelli Italy
- Mary Louise Wright United States
- Pamela Davis Great Britain
- Kazuo Ohashi Japan
- Suzanne Francis Canada
- Lily Klapp Switzerland

Substitute judge:

- Eugen Romminger West Germany
