= 1983 World Figure Skating Championships =

Annual figure skating competition held in 1983

- Type: ISU Championship
- Date: March 8 – 13
- Season: 1982–83
- Location: Helsinki, Finland
- Venue: Helsinki Ice Hall

Champions
- Men's singles: (United States) Scott Hamilton
- Ladies' singles: (United States) Rosalynn Sumners
- Pairs: (Soviet Union) Elena Valova / Oleg Vasiliev
- Ice dance: (United Kingdom) Jayne Torvill / Christopher Dean
- Previous: 1982 World Championships
- Next: 1984 World Championships

The 1983 World Figure Skating Championships were held in Helsinki, Finland from March 8 to 13. At the event, sanctioned by the International Skating Union, medals were awarded in men's singles, ladies' singles, pair skating, and ice dancing.

The ISU Representative was Hermann Schiechtl and the ISU Technical Delegate Elemér Terták. The original dance was part of the competition for the first time.

== Medal tables ==
=== Medalists ===
Discipline	Gold	Silver	Bronze
Men	(United States) Scott Hamilton	(West Germany) Norbert Schramm	(Canada) Brian Orser
Ladies	(United States) Rosalynn Sumners	(West Germany) Claudia Leistner	(Soviet Union) Elena Vodorezova
Pair skating	(Soviet Union) Elena Valova / Oleg Vasiliev	(East Germany) Sabine Baeß / Tassilo Thierbach	(Canada) Barbara Underhill / Paul Martini
Ice dancing	(United Kingdom) Jayne Torvill / Christopher Dean	(Soviet Union) Natalia Bestemianova / Andrei Bukin	(United States) Judy Blumberg / Michael Seibert

=== Medals by country ===
Rank	Nation	Gold	Silver	Bronze	Total
1	United States (USA)	2	0	1	3
2	Soviet Union (URS)	1	1	1	3
3	Great Britain (GBR)	1	0	0	1
4	West Germany (FRG)	0	2	0	2
5	East Germany (GDR)	0	1	0	1
6	Canada (CAN)	0	0	2	2
Totals (6 entries)		4	4	4	12

== Results ==
=== Men ===
Rank	Name	Nation	CP	SP	FS	SP+FS	Points	Total
1	Scott Hamilton	United States	2	1	1	1		2.6
2	Norbert Schramm	West Germany	4	3	3	3		6.6
3	Brian Orser	Canada	8	2	2	2		7.6
4	Alexander Fadeev	Soviet Union	6	4	4	4		9.2
5	Jean-Christophe Simond	France	1	5	7	7		9.8
6	Jozef Sabovčík	Czechoslovakia	3	9	5	5		10.4
7	Brian Boitano	United States	9	7	6	6		14.2
8	Heiko Fischer	West Germany	5	8	9	8		15.2
9	Vladimir Kotin	Soviet Union	7	6	10	10		16.6
10	Rudi Cerne	West Germany	10	11	8	9		18.4
11	Laurent Depouilly	France	12	13	11	12		23.4
12	Falko Kirsten	East Germany	14	10	12	11		24.4
13	Gary Beacom	Canada	11	17	14	14		27.4
14	Mark Cockerell	United States	19	12	13	13		29.2
15	Lars Åkesson	Sweden	13	14	17	17		30.4
16	Miljan Begović	Yugoslavia	15	15	16	16		31.0
17	Masaru Ogawa	Japan	17	16	15	15		31.6
18	Shinji Someya	Japan	16	18	19	18		35.8
19	Thomas Hlavik	Austria	18	21	18	19		37.2
20	Mark Pepperday	United Kingdom	21	19	20	20		40.2
21	Cameron Medhurst	Australia	20	20	21	21		41.0
22	Fernando Soria	Spain	22	22	22	22		44.0

Referee:

- Sonia Bianchetti Italy

Assistant Referee:

- Oskar Madl Austria

Judges:

- Irina Absaliamova Soviet Union
- Kazuo Ohashi Japan
- Heinz Müllenbach West Germany
- Helga von Wiecki East Germany
- Tjaša Andrée Yugoslavia
- Monique Georgelin France
- Hugh C. Graham, Jr. United States
- Gerhardt Bubnik Czechoslovakia
- Margaret Berezowski Canada

Substitute judge:

- Walter Hütter Austria

=== Ladies ===
Rank	Name	Nation	CP	SP	FS	SP+FS	Points	Total
1	Rosalynn Sumners	United States	1	4	1	2		3.2
2	Claudia Leistner	West Germany	5	2	3	3		6.8
3	Elena Vodorezova	Soviet Union	3	3	4	4		7.0
4	Katarina Witt	East Germany	8	1	2	1		7.2
5	Anna Kondrashova	Soviet Union	9	5	5	5		12.4
6	Kristiina Wegelius	Finland	2	9	9	9		13.8
7	Kay Thomson	Canada	6	11	6	7		14.0
8	Manuela Ruben	West Germany	7	10	8	8		16.2
9	Tiffany Chin	United States	14	6	7	6		17.8
10	Sandra Cariboni	Switzerland	4	16	12	13		20.8
11	Janina Wirth	East Germany	15	7	10	10		21.8
12	Charlene Wong	Canada	13	8	11	11		22.0
13	Sanda Dubravčić	Yugoslavia	11	13	13	12		24.8
14	Sonja Stanek	Austria	10	17	14	14		26.8
15	Katrien Pauwels	Belgium	12	20	15	15		30.2
B Section
16	Karin Telser	Italy	21	12	3	2		20.4
17	Catarina Lindgren	Sweden	18	15	5	4		21.8
18	Juri Ozawa	Japan	24	18	1	3		22.6
19	Susan Jackson	United Kingdom	25	14	2	1		22.6
20	Hanne Gamborg	Denmark	19	19	6	6		25.0
21	Elise Ahonen	Finland	22	22	4	5		26.0
22	Li Scha Wang	Netherlands	20	23	7	7		28.2
23	Alison Southwood	United Kingdom	16	27	8	9		28.4
24	Béatrice Farinacci	France	17	24	9	8		28.8
25	Susanne Gschwend	Austria	23	26	10	11		34.2
26	Vicki Holland	Australia	26	21	11	10		35.0
27	Rosario Esteban	Spain	28	25	12	12		38.8
WD	Lim Hye-kyung	South Korea	27	28				
WD	Elaine Zayak	United States						

Referee:

- Benjamin T. Wright United States

Assistant Referee:

- Leena Vainio Finland

Judges:

- Linda Petersen Denmark
- Raymond Alperth United States
- Margaret Berezowski Canada
- Jacqueline Itschner Switzerland
- Monique Petis France
- Ludwig Gassner Austria
- Eugen Romminger West Germany
- Hideo Sugita Japan
- Britta Lindgren Sweden
- Walburga Grimm East Germany

Substitute judge:

- Giovanni De Mori Italy

=== Pairs ===
Rank	Name	Nation	SP	FS	Points	Total
1	Elena Valova / Oleg Vasiliev	Soviet Union	2	1		1.8
2	Sabine Baeß / Tassilo Thierbach	East Germany	1	2		2.4
3	Barbara Underhill / Paul Martini	Canada	3	3		4.2
4	Kitty Carruthers / Peter Carruthers	United States	5	4		6.0
5	Veronika Pershina / Marat Akbarov	Soviet Union	6	5		7.4
6	Marina Pestova / Stanislav Leonovich	Soviet Union	4	7		8.6
7	Lea Ann Miller / William Fauver	United States	8	6		9.2
8	Birgit Lorenz / Knut Schubert	East Germany	7	7		9.8
9	Cynthia Coull / Mark Rowsom	Canada	9	9		12.6
10	Katherina Matousek / Lloyd Eisler	Canada	10	10		14.0
11	Jill Watson / Burt Lancon	United States	11	11		15.4
12	Babette Preußler / Torsten Ohlow	East Germany	12	12		16.8
13	Susan Garland / Ian Jenkins	United Kingdom	14	13		18.6
14	Toshimi Ito / Takashi Mura	Japan	13	14		19.2
15	Jana Havlová / René Novotný	Czechoslovakia	15	15		21.0
16	Claudia Massari / Leonardo Azzola	West Germany	16	16		22.4
17	Maija Pekkala / Pekka Pekkala	Finland	17	17		23.8

Referee:

- Donald H. Gilchrist Canada

Assistant Referee:

- Erika Schiechtl West Germany

Judges:

- Suzanne Fancis Canada
- Mikhail Drei Soviet Union
- Ingrid Reetz West Germany
- Hely Abbondati Finland
- Dagmar Řeháková Czechoslovakia
- Virginia LeFevre United States
- Sally-Anne Stapleford United Kingdom
- Ingrid Linke East Germany
- Hideo Sugita Japan

Substitute judge:

- Jürg Wilhelm Switzerland

=== Ice dancing ===
Jayne Torvill / Christopher Dean got 5.9 scores from all nine judges in their third dance, the Argentine tango, of the compulsory portion of the event.

Rank	Name	Nation	CD	OSP	FD	Total
1	Jayne Torvill / Christopher Dean	United Kingdom	1	1	1	2.0
2	Natalia Bestemianova / Andrei Bukin	Soviet Union	3	3	2	5.0
3	Judy Blumberg / Michael Seibert	United States	2	2	3	5.0
4	Olga Volozhinskaya / Alexander Svinin	Soviet Union	5	4	4	8.6
5	Karen Barber / Nicholas Slater	United Kingdom	4	8	5	10.6
6	Tracy Wilson / Robert McCall	Canada	7	5	6	12.2
7	Elisa Spitz / Scott Gregory	United States	6	6	7	13.0
8	Elena Batanova / Alexei Soloviev	Soviet Union	8	7	8	15.6
9	Petra Born / Rainer Schönborn	West Germany	10	9	9	18.6
10	Kelly Johnson / John Thomas	Canada	13	11	10	22.2
11	Isabella Micheli / Roberto Pelizzola	Italy	12	10	11	22.2
12	Wendy Sessions / Stephen Williams	United Kingdom	11	12	12	23.4
13	Judit Péterfy / Csaba Bálint	Hungary	14	14	13	27.0
14	Noriko Sato / Tadayuki Takahashi	Japan	15	13	14	28.2
15	Marianne van Bommel / Wayne Deweyert	Netherlands	16	15	15	30.6
16	Kathrin Beck / Christoff Beck	Austria	17	16	16	32.6
17	Claudia Schmidlin / Daniel Schmidlin	Switzerland	18	17	17	34.6
18	Hristina Boyanova / Javor Ivanov	Bulgaria	19	18	18	36.6
WD	Nathalie Herve / Pierre Bechu	France	9			

Referee:

- Lawrence Demmy United Kingdom

Assistant Referee:

- Roland Wehinger Austria

Judges:

- Cia Bordogna Italy
- Jürg Wilhelm Switzerland
- Kazuo Ohashi Japan
- Margaret Freepartner United States
- Ann Shaw Canada
- Heide Maritszak Austria
- Igor Kabanov Soviet Union
- Katalin Alpern Hungary
- Roy Mason United Kingdom

Substitute judge:

- Lysiane Lauret France

== Sources ==
- Result list provided by the ISU
