= 1985 World Figure Skating Championships =

Annual figure skating competition held in 1985

- Type: ISU Championship
- Date: March 3 – 10
- Season: 1984–85
- Location: Tokyo, Japan
- Venue: Yoyogi National Gymnasium

Champions
- Men's singles: (Soviet Union) Alexander Fadeev
- Ladies' singles: (East Germany) Katarina Witt
- Pairs: (Soviet Union) Elena Valova / Oleg Vasiliev
- Ice dance: (Soviet Union) Natalia Bestemianova / Andrei Bukin
- Previous: 1984 World Championships
- Next: 1986 World Championships

The 1985 World Figure Skating Championships were held at the Yoyogi National Gymnasium in Tokyo, Japan from March 3 to 10. At the event, sanctioned by the International Skating Union, medals were awarded in men's singles, ladies' singles, pair skating, and ice dancing.

== Medal tables ==
=== Medalists ===
| Discipline | Gold | Silver | Bronze |
|---|---|---|---|
| Men | (Soviet Union) Alexander Fadeev | (Canada) Brian Orser | (United States) Brian Boitano |
| Ladies | (East Germany) Katarina Witt | (Soviet Union) Kira Ivanova | (United States) Tiffany Chin |
| Pair skating | (Soviet Union) Elena Valova / Oleg Vasiliev | (Soviet Union) Larisa Selezneva / Oleg Makarov | (Canada) Katherina Matousek / Lloyd Eisler |
| Ice dancing | (Soviet Union) Natalia Bestemianova / Andrei Bukin | (Soviet Union) Marina Klimova / Sergei Ponomarenko | (United States) Judy Blumberg / Michael Seibert |

=== Medals by country ===
| Rank | Nation | Gold | Silver | Bronze | Total |
|---|---|---|---|---|---|
| 1 | Soviet Union (URS) | 3 | 3 | 0 | 6 |
| 2 | East Germany (GDR) | 1 | 0 | 0 | 1 |
| 3 | Canada (CAN) | 0 | 1 | 1 | 2 |
| 4 | United States (USA) | 0 | 0 | 3 | 3 |
| Totals (4 entries) | | 4 | 4 | 4 | 12 |

== Results ==
=== Men ===
| Rank | Name | Nation | TFP | CF | SP | FS |
|---|---|---|---|---|---|---|
| 1 | Alexander Fadeev | Soviet Union | 2.0 | 1 | 1 | 1 |
| 2 | Brian Orser | Canada | 5.2 | 4 | 2 | 2 |
| 3 | Brian Boitano | United States | 7.6 | 5 | 4 | 3 |
| 4 | Jozef Sabovčík | Czechoslovakia | 8.4 | 2 | 3 | 6 |
| 5 | Vladimir Kotin | Soviet Union | 9.6 | 6 | 5 | 4 |
| 6 | Heiko Fischer | West Germany | 13.0 | 8 | 8 | 5 |
| 7 | Grzegorz Filipowski | Poland | 13.6 | 7 | 6 | 7 |
| 8 | Mark Cockerell | United States | 20.4 | 16 | 7 | 8 |
| 9 | Viktor Petrenko | Soviet Union | 21.4 | 12 | 13 | 9 |
| 10 | Neil Paterson | Canada | 24.8 | 15 | 12 | 11 |
| 11 | Richard Zander | West Germany | 25.0 | 11 | 11 | 14 |
| 12 | Falko Kirsten | East Germany | 25.4 | 19 | 10 | 10 |
| 13 | Petr Barna | Czechoslovakia | 26.4 | 18 | 9 | 12 |
| 14 | Masaru Ogawa | Japan | 27.0 | 14 | 14 | 13 |
| 15 | Fernand Fédronic | France | 27.0 | 3 | 18 | 18 |
| 16 | Lars Åkesson | Sweden | 28.4 | 9 | 15 | 17 |
| 17 | Gordon Forbes | Canada | 30.2 | 13 | 16 | 16 |
| 18 | Cameron Medhurst | Australia | 32.0 | 17 | 17 | 15 |
| 19 | Oliver Höner | Switzerland | 33.8 | 10 | 22 | 19 |
| 20 | Alessandro Riccitelli | Italy | 40.4 | 20 | 21 | 20 |
Free skating not reached
| 21 | Stephen Pickavance | United Kingdom | | 23 | 20 | |
| 22 | Oula Jääskeläinen | Finland | | 21 | 19 | |
| 23 | Xu Zhaoxiao | China | | 24 | 23 | |
| 24 | Lars Dresler | Denmark | | 22 | 24 | |
| 25 | Cho Jae-hyung | South Korea | | 25 | 25 | |
| 26 | Fernando Soria | Spain | | 26 | 26 | |
| 27 | Cheukfai Lai | Hong Kong | | 27 | 27 | |

=== Ladies ===
| Rank | Name | Nation | TFP | CF | SP | FS |
|---|---|---|---|---|---|---|
| 1 | Katarina Witt | East Germany | 3.2 | 3 | 1 | 1 |
| 2 | Kira Ivanova | Soviet Union | 3.8 | 1 | 3 | 2 |
| 3 | Tiffany Chin | United States | 5.0 | 2 | 2 | 3 |
| 4 | Anna Kondrashova | Soviet Union | 9.0 | 4 | 4 | 5 |
| 5 | Debi Thomas | United States | 10.2 | 7 | 5 | 4 |
| 6 | Claudia Leistner | West Germany | 13.4 | 5 | 11 | 6 |
| 7 | Natalia Lebedeva | Soviet Union | 15.6 | 8 | 7 | 8 |
| 8 | Agnès Gosselin | France | 20.6 | 9 | 13 | 10 |
| 9 | Elizabeth Manley | Canada | 22.0 | 10 | 10 | 12 |
| 10 | Cynthia Coull | Canada | 23.0 | 18 | 8 | 9 |
| 11 | Constanze Gensel | East Germany | 23.2 | 21 | 9 | 7 |
| 12 | Patricia Neske | West Germany | 24.4 | 11 | 17 | 11 |
| 13 | Susan Jackson | United Kingdom | 26.2 | 14 | 12 | 13 |
| 14 | Simone Koch | East Germany | 27.6 | 17 | 6 | 15 |
| 15 | Elise Ahonen | Finland | 31.0 | 13 | 18 | 16 |
| 16 | Claudia Villiger | Switzerland | 31.2 | 12 | 15 | 18 |
| 17 | Sandra Cariboni | Switzerland | 31.2 | 6 | 19 | 20 |
| 18 | Masako Kato | Japan | 33.0 | 14 | 14 | 19 |
| 19 | Lotta Falkenback | Sweden | 34.2 | 19 | 22 | 14 |
| 20 | Tamara Téglássy | Hungary | 34.6 | 16 | 20 | 17 |
Free skating not reached
| 21 | Lim Hye-kyung | South Korea | | 23 | 16 | |
| 22 | Amanda James | Australia | | 20 | 24 | |
| 23 | Jiang Yibing | China | | 24 | 21 | |
| 24 | Petya Gavazova | Bulgaria | | 25 | 23 | |
| 25 | Marta Olozagarre | Spain | | 22 | 25 | |
| 26 | Shukching Ngai | Hong Kong | | 26 | 26 | |
| WD | Midori Ito | Japan | | | | |
| WD | Katrien Pauwels | Belgium | | | | |

=== Pairs ===
| Rank | Name | Nation | TFP | SP | FS |
|---|---|---|---|---|---|
| 1 | Elena Valova / Oleg Vasiliev | Soviet Union | 1.8 | 2 | 1 |
| 2 | Larisa Selezneva / Oleg Makarov | Soviet Union | 2.4 | 1 | 2 |
| 3 | Katherina Matousek / Lloyd Eisler | Canada | 4.2 | 3 | 3 |
| 4 | Jill Watson / Peter Oppegard | United States | 6.4 | 6 | 4 |
| 5 | Melinda Kunhegyi / Lyndon Johnston | Canada | 7.8 | 7 | 5 |
| 6 | Veronika Pershina / Marat Akbarov | Soviet Union | 8.0 | 5 | 6 |
| 7 | Cynthia Coull / Mark Rowsom | Canada | 8.6 | 4 | 7 |
| 8 | Manuela Landgraf / Ingo Steuer | East Germany | 11.2 | 8 | 8 |
| 9 | Natalie Seybold / Wayne Seybold | United States | 12.6 | 9 | 9 |
| 10 | Claudia Massari / Daniel Caprano | West Germany | 14.0 | 10 | 10 |
| 11 | Danielle Carr / Stephen Carr | Australia | 16.4 | 12 | 11 |
| 12 | Jun Fan / Jihong Sun | China | 16.4 | 11 | 12 |
| 13 | Shukling Ngai / Kwokyung Mak | Hong Kong | 18.2 | 13 | 13 |

Referee:

- Elemér Terták Hungary

Assistant Referee:

- Donald H. Gilchrist Canada

Judges:

- Eugen Romminger West Germany
- Ingrid Linke East Germany
- Sergei Kononykhin Soviet Union
- Frances Dafoe Canada
- Dagmar Řeháková Czechoslovakia
- Shirly Taylor Australia
- Hugh C. Graham Jr. United States
- Klára Kozári Hungary
- Jürg Badraun Switzerland

Substitute judge:

- Thérèse Maisel France

=== Ice dancing ===
| Rank | Name | Nation | TFP | CD | OSP | FD |
|---|---|---|---|---|---|---|
| 1 | Natalia Bestemianova / Andrei Bukin | Soviet Union | 2.0 | 1 | 1 | 1 |
| 2 | Marina Klimova / Sergei Ponomarenko | Soviet Union | 4.0 | 2 | 2 | 2 |
| 3 | Judy Blumberg / Michael Seibert | United States | 6.0 | 3 | 3 | 3 |
| 4 | Tracy Wilson / Robert McCall | Canada | 8.0 | 4 | 4 | 4 |
| 5 | Petra Born / Rainer Schönborn | West Germany | 10.0 | 5 | 5 | 5 |
| 6 | Karen Barber / Nicholas Slater | United Kingdom | 12.0 | 6 | 6 | 6 |
| 7 | Natalia Annenko / Genrikh Sretenski | Soviet Union | 14.0 | 7 | 7 | 7 |
| 8 | Isabella Micheli / Roberto Pelizzola | Italy | 16.4 | 8 | 9 | 8 |
| 9 | Kathrin Beck / Christoff Beck | Austria | 17.6 | 9 | 8 | 9 |
| 10 | Karyn Garossino / Rod Garossino | Canada | 20.0 | 10 | 10 | 10 |
| 11 | Renée Roca / Donald Adair | United States | 22.0 | 11 | 11 | 11 |
| 12 | Suzanne Semanick / Scott Gregory | United States | 24.0 | 12 | 12 | 12 |
| 13 | Noriko Sato / Tadayuki Takahashi | Japan | 26.0 | 13 | 13 | 13 |
| 14 | Klára Engi / Attila Tóth | Hungary | 28.0 | 14 | 14 | 14 |
| 15 | Sharon Jones / Paul Askham | United Kingdom | 31.0 | 16 | 16 | 15 |
| 16 | Antonia Becherer / Ferdinand Becherer | West Germany | 31.0 | 15 | 15 | 16 |
| 17 | Martine Olivier / Philippe Boissier | France | 34.0 | 17 | 17 | 17 |
| 18 | Liu Luyang / Zhao Xiaolei | China | 37.0 | 19 | 19 | 18 |
| 19 | Liane Telling / Michael Fisher | Australia | 37.0 | 18 | 18 | 19 |
