= Grand Prix International St. Gervais =

International figure skating competition

- Status: Defunct
- Genre: International competition
- Frequency: Annual
- Location: Saint-Gervais-les-Bains
- Country: France
- Years active: 1967–96
- Organizer: French Federation of Ice Sports

The Grand Prix International St. Gervais (French: Grand Prix International de Patinage Artistique) was an annual figure skating competition organized by the French Federation of Ice Sports (French: Fédération française des sports de glace). It was held between 1967 and 1996 in Saint-Gervais-les-Bains, France, near Mont Blanc in the French Alps. For many years, it was paired with the Nebelhorn Trophy in Germany as part of the Coupe des Alpes, since many of the same competitors attended both events.

Medals were awarded in men's singles, women's singles, pair skating, and ice dance, although not every discipline was necessarily held every year.

== History ==
The first edition of the Grand Prix International St. Gervais was held in 1967 in Saint-Gervais-les-Bains, a commune in the Haute-Savoie department of southeastern France. It sits in the shadow of Mont Blanc in the French Alps. For many years, the Grand Prix International was paired with the Nebelhorn Trophy – a skating competition in Oberstdorf, Germany – to form the Coupe des Alpes, with many of the same skaters participating in both events. A team trophy was occasionally presented to the country with the highest combined placements across both competitions.

The last edition of the Grand Prix International St. Gervais was held in 1996. In 1997, the Junior Grand Prix of Figure Skating (JGP) – then called the Junior Series – was established by the International Skating Union as a series of international skating competitions exclusively for junior-level skaters. France hosted one of the inaugural events in Saint-Gervais-les-Bains. Subsequent competitions were held in 1998, 2000, and 2016.

== Medalists ==
=== Men's singles ===
Men's event medalists
Year	Gold	Silver	Bronze	Ref.
1967				
1968				
1969	(United Kingdom) Haig Oundjian	(United States) James Stewart	(Canada) Toller Cranston	
1970	(United Kingdom) John Curry	(Canada) Ron Shaver	(United Kingdom) Michael Fish	
1971	(France) Jacques Mrozek	(United States) Robert Bradshaw	(Canada) Kenneth Polk	
1972	(United States) Robert Bradshaw	(United States) Terry Kubicka	(Canada) Patrick McKilligan	
1973	(United States) Charles Tickner	(Canada) Lee Armstrong	(France) Didier Gailhaguet	
1974	(United States) David Santee	(Luxembourg) Paul Cechmanek	(France) Jean-Christophe Simond	
1975	(United States) Ken Newfield	(Canada) Ted Barton	(France) Jean-Christophe Simond	
1976	(United Kingdom) Robin Cousins	(Japan) Fumio Igarashi	(United States) Scott Hamilton	
1977	(United States) Robert Wagenhoffer	(Canada) Brian Pockar	(West Germany) Rudi Cerne	
1978	(United States) Allen Schramm	(United States) Mark Cockerell	(Canada) Gary Beacom	
1979	(West Germany) Rudi Cerne	(Canada) Gordon Forbes	(United States) Brian Boitano	
1980	(Canada) Brian Orser	(West Germany) Norbert Schramm	(France) Philippe Paulet	
1981	(West Germany) Heiko Fischer	(United States) Jim White	(Canada) Kevin Hicks	
1982	(France) Fernand Fedronic	(United States) Scott Williams	(Italy) Bruno Delmaestro	
1983	(France) Philippe Paulet	(Soviet Union) Gurgen Vardanjan	(United States) Scott Driscoll	
1984	(United States) Craig Henderson	(West Germany) Richard Zander	(Soviet Union) Leonid Kaznakov	
1985	(United States) Doug Mattis	(Canada) Kurt Browning	(France) Philippe Roncoli	
1986	(United States) Erik Larson	(Canada) Kurt Browning	(France) Frédéric Harpagès	
1987	(United States) Todd Eldredge	(United States) Patrick Brault	(Canada) Michael Slipchuk	
1988	(Canada) Marcus Christensen	(United States) Christopher Mitchell	(United States) Aren Nielsen	
1989	(United States) Colin Vanderveen	(United States) Shepherd Clark	(France) Philippe Candeloro	
1990	(Soviet Union) Alexei Urmanov	(United States) Michael Chack	(Soviet Union) Oleg Tataurov	
1991	(France) Philippe Candeloro	(Soviet Union) Oleg Tataurov	(United States) Ryan Hunka	
1992	(France) Alexandre Orset	(Chinese Taipei) David Liu	(United States) Daniel Hollander	
1993	(Israel) Michael Shmerkin	(United States) Michael Weiss	(Canada) Jeffrey Langdon	
1994	(France) Thierry Cerez	(France) Gabriel Monnier	(France) Francis Gastellu	
1995	(France) Stanick Jeannette	(Russia) Igor Sinyutin	(Russia) Sergei Rylov	
1996	(United States) Derrick Delmore	(United States) Timothy Goebel	(Russia) Sergey Kitov	
For results after 1996, see ISU Junior Grand Prix in France

=== Women's singles ===
Women's event medalists
Year	Gold	Silver	Bronze	Ref.
1967				
1968	(United States) Jennie Walsh			
1969	(United States) Debrah Lauer	(Canada) Cathy Lee Irwin	(France) Joëlle Cartaux	
1970	(Canada) Cathy Lee Irwin	(United States) Mary Lynn Gelderman	(United States) Suna Murray	
1971	(United States) Dorothy Hamill	(United States) Julie McKinstry	(Canada) Julie Black	
1972	(Switzerland) Karin Iten	(United States) Wendy Burge	(West Germany) Isabel de Navarre	
1973	(United States) Linda Fratianne	(United States) Kath Malmberg	(Canada) Kim Alletson	
1974	(United States) Barbara Smith	(United States) Priscilla Hill	(Canada) Peggy McLean	
1975	(United States) Lisa-Marie Allen	(Japan) Emi Watanabe	(Switzerland) Danielle Rieder	
1976	(West Germany) Garnet Ostermeier	(Switzerland) Denise Biellmann	(United States) Carrie Rugh	
1977	(Japan) Reiko Kobayashi	(Switzerland) Anita Siegried	(United States) Sandy Lenz	
1978	(Switzerland) Denise Biellmann	(United States) Editha Dotson	(Canada) Janet Morrissey	
1979	(United States) Lynn Smith	(Switzerland) Danielle Rieder	(United States) Jacki Farrell	
1980	(United States) Vikki de Vries	(Canada) Elizabeth Manley	(France) Anne-Sophie de Kristoffy	
1981	(Canada) Charlene Wong	(United States) Kristy Hogan	(United States) Stephanie Anderson	
1982	(West Germany) Manuela Ruben	(United States) Kelley Webster	(United States) Jill Frost	
1983	(Belgium) Katrien Pauwels	(Canada) Lana Sherman	(United States) Stacy McMullin	
1984	(United States) Debi Thomas	(Japan) Juri Ozawa	(United States) Sara MacInnes	
1985	(United States) Tracey Damigella	(Canada) Rosmarie Sakic	(West Germany) Patricia Neske	
1986	(United States) Holly Cook	(Canada) Pamela Giangualano	(West Germany) Cornelia Renner	
1987	(Canada) Shannon Allison	(United States) Rory Flack	(France) Claude Péri	
1988	(United States) Tonia Kwiatkowski	(West Germany) Patricia Neske	(Canada) Josée Chouinard	
1989	(United States) Kyoko Ina	(France) Surya Bonaly	(Italy) Sabine Contini	
1990	(West Germany) Patricia Neske	(Soviet Union) Elena Kushnir	(Canada) Mary Angela Lamer-Wilson	
1991	(France) Surya Bonaly	(United States) Lisa Ervin	(Canada) Sherry Ball	
1992	(France) Surya Bonaly	(Canada) Cathy Belanger	(Canada) Angela Derochie	
1993	(United States) Jenna Pittman	(Canada) Susan Humphreys	(Finland) Mila Kajas	
1994	(United States) Amanda Ward	(Japan) Shizuka Arakawa	(France) Vanessa Gusmeroli	
1995	(Russia) Elena Ivanova	(United States) Sydne Vogel	(France) Vanessa Gusmeroli	
1996	(Russia) Elena Sokolova	(United States) Shelby Lyons	(Ukraine) Elena Volohova	
For results after 1996, see ISU Junior Grand Prix in France

=== Pairs ===
Pairs event medalists
Year	Gold	Silver	Bronze	Ref.
1967				
1968	(United States); Sheri Thrapp; Larry Dusich	(United Kingdom); Susan Getty; Roy Bradshaw		
1969	(Switzerland); Edith Sperl; Heinz Wirz	(Canada); Mary Petrie; Robert McAvoy	(Czechoslovakia); Mirka Sabilková; Pavel Komarek	
1970	(Canada); Sandra Bezic; Val Bezic	(United States); Sheri Thrapp; Larry Dusich	(United Kingdom); Linda Connolly; Colin Taylforth	
1971	(Canada); Marion Murray; Glenn Moore	(United States); Cynthia Van Valkenburg; James Hulick	(United States); Gale Fuhrman; Joel Fuhrman	
1972	(United States); Gale Fuhrman; Joel Fuhrman	(United States); Cozette Cady; Jack Courtney	(Switzerland); Karin Künzle; Christian Künzle	
1973	(Switzerland); Karin Künzle; Christian Künzle	(West Germany); Corinna Halke; Eberhard Rausch	(United States); Tai Babilonia; Randy Gardner	
1974	(Canada); Kathy Huntchinson; Jamie McGregor	(Canada); Candace Jones; Don Fraser	(United Kingdom); Linda McCafferty; Colin Taylforth	
1975	(Canada); Cheri Pinner; Dennis Pinner	(United States); Alice Cook; William Fauver	(Canada); Karen Newton; Glenn LaFramboise	
1976	(West Germany); Susanne Scheibe; Andreas Nischwitz	(France); Sabine Fuchs; Xavier Videau	(Japan); Natsuko Hagiwara; Sumio Murata	
1977	(United States); Gail Hamula; Frank Sweiding	(United States); Sheryl Franks; Michael Botticelli	(West Germany); Susanne Scheibe; Andreas Nischwitz	
1978	(Canada); Barbara Underhill; Paul Martini	(United States); Tracy Prussack; Scott Prussack	(United States); Maria Di Domenico; Larry Schrier	
1979	(United States); Caitlin Carruthers; Peter Carruthers	(Canada); Rebecca Gough; Mark Rowsom	(Canada); Mary Jo Fedy; Timothy Mills	
1980	(Soviet Union) Nelli Chervotkina / Viktor Teslia	(United Kingdom) Susan Garland / Robert Daw	(Canada); Mary Jo Fedy; Timothy Mills	
1981	(Canada) Melinda Kunhegyi / Lyndon Johnston	(Soviet Union) Elena Valova / Oleg Vasiliev	(France) Nathalie Tortel / Xavier Videau	
1982	(Soviet Union) Inna Volyanskaya / Valery Spiridonov	(Canada) Katherina Matousek / Lloyd Eisler	(United States) Natalie Seybold / Wayne Seybold	
1983	(Soviet Union) Inna Bekker / Sergei Likhanski	(United States) Katy Keeley / Gary Kemp	(Canada) Laurene Collin / David Howe	
1984	(Soviet Union) Elena Bechke / Valeri Kornienko	(United States) Susan Dungjen / Jason Dungjen	(United States) Margo Shoup / Patrick Page	
1985	(Canada) Christine Hough / Doug Ladret	(Soviet Union) Lyudmila Koblova / Andrei Kalitin	(United Kingdom) Lisa Cushley / Neil Cushley	
1986	(Canada) Melanie Gaylor / Lee Barkell	(United States) Ashley Stevenson / Scott Wendland	(United Kingdom) Lisa Cushley / Neil Cushley	
1987	(Canada); Michelle Menzies; Kevin Wheeler	(Canada); Twana Rose; Colin Epp	(United States); Michelle Laughlin; Mark Naylor	
1988	(Canada) Cindy Landry / Lyndon Johnston	(Canada) Marie-Josee Fortin / Jean-Michel Bombardier	(United States) Kenna Bailey / John Denton	
1989	(Soviet Union); Elena Leonova; Gennadi Krasnitski	(Soviet Union); Inna Svetacheva; Vladimir Chagov	(Canada); Patricia MacNeil; Cory Watson	
1990	(Canada); Stacey Ball; Jean-Michel Bombardier	(Soviet Union); Svetlana Pristav; Viacheslav Tkachenko	(United States); Tristen Vega; Richard Alexander	
1991	(Soviet Union) Natalia Krestianinova / Alexei Torchinski	(Soviet Union) Elena Nikonova / Nikolai Apter	(Soviet Union) Elena Ledinkina / Denis Tikhonov	
1992	(Russia) Elena Ledinkina / Denis Tikhonov	(Russia) Natalia Krestianinova / Alexei Torchinski	(Canada) Tiina Muur / Cory Watson	
1993	(Canada) Caroline Haddad / Jean-Sébastien Fecteau	(United States) Stephanie Stiegler / Lance Travis	(Canada) Isabelle Coulombe / Bruno Marcotte	
1994	(France) Sarah Abitbol / Stéphane Bernardis	(Canada) Marie-Claude Savard-Gagnon / Luc Bradet	(France) Lyne Haddad / Sylvain Privé	
1995	(Poland) Dorota Zagorska / Mariusz Siudek	(Canada) Marilyn Luis / Patrice Archetto	(Canada) Samantha Marchant / Chad Hawse	
1996	(United States); Natalie Vlandis; Jered Guzman	(Russia); Victoria Maksyuta; Vladislav Zhovnirski	(Ukraine); Evgenia Filonenko; Igor Marchenko	
For results after 1996, see ISU Junior Grand Prix in France

=== Ice dance ===
Ice dance event medalists
Year	Gold	Silver	Bronze	Ref.
No ice dance competitions prior to 1976
1976	(United Kingdom); Jane Torvill; Christopher Dean	(France); Muriel Boucher; Yves Malatier	(United Kingdom); Carol Long; Philip Stowell	
1977	(United States); Carol Fox; Richard Dalley	(France); Muriel Boucher; Yves Malatier	(United Kingdom); Wendy Sessions; Marc Reed	
1978	(United States); Kim Krohn; Barry Hagan	(United Kingdom); Karen Barber; Kim Spreyer	(United Kingdom); Tandy Buxton; Trevor Davies	
1979	(Canada); Gina Aucoin; Hans-Peter Ponikau	(France); Nathalie Hervé; Pierre Béchu	(United Kingdom); Carol Long; John Philpot	
1980	(Soviet Union) Olga Volozhinskaya / Alexander Svinin	(France); Nathalie Hervé; Pierre Béchu	(United Kingdom) Wendy Sessions / Stephen Williams	
1981	(United Kingdom) Karen Roughton / Marc Reed	(United States) Janice Kindrachuk / Blake Hobson	(Soviet Union) Tatiana Kuzmina / Igor Tchinaev	
1982	(Soviet Union) Marina Klimova / Sergei Ponomarenko	(Italy) Isabella Micheli / Roberto Pelizzola	(Canada) Isabelle Duchesnay / Paul Duchesnay	
1983	(Soviet Union) Marina Klimova / Sergei Ponomarenko	(United States) Eleanor DeVera / James Yorke	(West Germany) Antonia Becherer / Ferdinand Becherer	
1984	(Soviet Union) Irina Zhuk / Oleg Petrov	(United States) Lois Luciani / Russ Witherby	(United States) Kristan Lowery / Chip Rossbach	
1985	(Soviet Union) Maya Usova / Alexander Zhulin	(France) Doriane Bontemps / Charles Paliard	(United States) April Sargent / John D'Amelio	
1986	(United States) Karen Knieriem / Leif Erickson	(Italy) Lia Trovati / Roberto Pelizzola	(France) Dominique Yvon / Frederic Palluel	
1987	(Italy); Anna Croci; Luca Mantovani	(United States); Dorothi Rodek; Robert Nardozza	(Canada); Catherine Pal; Donald Godfrey	
1988	(Canada) Jacqueline Petr / Mark Janoschak	(United States) Elizabeth McLean / Ari Lieb	(United States) Elizabeth Punsalan / Shawn Rettstat	
1989	(Soviet Union); Irina Romanova; Igor Yaroshenko	(United States); Lisa Grove; Scott Myers	(France); Isabelle Sarech; Xavier Debernis	
1990	(France); Sophie Moniotte; Pascal Lavanchy	(Canada); Isabelle Labossiere; Mitchell Gould	(Soviet Union); Natalia Lines; Aleksei Kislitsyn	
1991	(Canada) Marie-France Dubreuil / Bruno Yvars	(Soviet Union) Ekaterina Proskurina / Oleg Fediukov	(Canada) Jennifer Boyce / Michel Brunet	
1992	(Canada) Shae-Lynn Bourne / Victor Kraatz	(Lithuania) Margarita Drobiazko / Povilas Vanagas	(United States) Tamara Kuchiki / Neale Smull	
1993	(Russia) Olga Ganicheva / Maxim Kachanov	(Canada) Martine Patenaude / Eric Massé	(France) Berangere Nau / Luc Moneger	
1994	(Italy) Barbara Fusar-Poli / Maurizio Margaglio	(France) Agnes Jacquemard / Alexis Gayet	(Canada) Chantal Lefebvre / Patrice Lauzon	
1995	(Poland) Iwona Filipowicz / Michal Szumski	(Canada) Megan Wing / Aaron Lowe	(France) Stephanie Guardia / Franck Laporte	
1996	(Russia); Nina Ulanova; Michail Stifunin	(Italy); Federica Faiella; Luciano Milo	(France); Melanie Espejo; Michael Zenezini	
For results after 1996, see ISU Junior Grand Prix in France
