= Batanov =

Batanov (Russian: Батанов) is a Russian masculine surname; its feminine counterpart is Batanova. It may refer to the following notable people:

- Boris Batanov (1934–2004), Soviet football player
- Elena Batanova (born 1964), Soviet ice dancer
