= Cynthia Coull =

Canadian figure skater

Personal information
- Born: 1965 (age 60–61)
- Height: 5 ft 1 in (155 cm)

Figure skating career
- Country: Canada
- Partner: Mark Rowsom
- Coach: Kerry Leitch
- Retired: 1988
Medal record
Representing Canada
Figure skating: Pairs
World Championships
Bronze medal – third place	1986 Geneva	Pairs

Cynthia Coull (born 1965) is a Canadian former figure skater who competed simultaneously in pair skating and women's singles. Competing in pairs with Mark Rowsom, she became the 1986 World bronze medallist, 1986 Skate Canada International champion, and a three-time consecutive national champion (1985–1987). As a single skater, she is the 1985 NHK Trophy silver medallist and a three-time national medallist (silver in 1985, bronze in 1983 and 1984).

== Career ==
=== Early career ===
Coull began skating at age 7. She took a year off training around age 11 after her family moved to Nigeria for a year. She was weak in compulsory figures.

In May 1982, she received a phone call from Kerry Leitch asking if she wanted to try out for pairs, in which she had not previously competed. Coull initially refused, but she changed her mind the next day after she saw an advertisement saying that Lloyd Eisler, the national silver medalist, needed a new partner. After trying out with Mark Rowsom, she left her hometown of Greenfield Park, Quebec to go to Kitchener, Ontario to train with him.

Coull's first competition as a pair skater was Skate America in 1982, where she and Rowson finished 4th. At the Canadian Skating Championships, Coull won the bronze medal, and she and Rowson won silver. They were assigned to the 1983 World Championships, where they placed 9th.

=== 1983–1984 season ===
Over the summer, Coull began working with a sport psychologist to improve her nerves in competition. In September, they began their season at the St. Ivel International. While they finished the short program in first place, they dropped to second to win the silver medal after the free skate, where Rowsom fell on a side-by-side jump and Coull fell on a throw jump, and both partners struggled to spin in sync.

Coull then skated in singles for the first time internationally at the 1983 Skate America in October. She struggled with her third compulsory figure and left that competition segment in 9th place, after which she said she "tensed up". In the short program, she moved up to 8th after issues with her combination jump and a fall on her double Axel jump. She rebounded in the free skate, where she had the second-highest-scoring program, and she finished in 5th overall. There was some confusion about her jump layout, as she appeared to repeat a toe loop jump in a way that was against the rules, but her coach explained that the judges recognized her last triple toe loop as a triple toe walley jump, taking off a different edge, instead.

In November, she and Rowsom won the silver medal at the Ennia Challenge Cup at The Hague. In January, at the Canadian Championships, she won a second consecutive bronze medal in singles. In pairs, she and Rowsom finished the short program in first place, but after a poor showing in their free skate, they sank to third place. Ahead of the 1984 World Championships, she sprained her ankle, and she and Rowsom redid their free skate. They finished in 7th out of ten couples competing.

=== 1984–1985 season ===
Coull competed at the St. Ivel International in September 1984, where she won the silver medal in singles. In late October, she and Rowsom competed at Skate Canada International; this was the first edition of the event where pairs skating was competed. They won the silver medal. In singles, Coull was 7th in the figures and made significant errors in the short program, including falling on her combination jump and singling a planned double Axel. She ultimately placed 8th out of ten skaters.

At the NHK Trophy in November, Coull, skating in singles, made mistakes on two of her triple jumps and placed 7th. She said, "My triples are not 100 per cent yet. I get them maybe 80 per cent of the time in practice, but the judges these days seem to want clean programs." At the Canadian Championships, she won both silver in the women's singles competition after a strong free skate and gold with Rowsom in the pairs competition.

She competed at the 1985 World Championships in both disciplines. Ahead of the Championships, she and Rowsom were unable to train their throw jumps properly due to injuries. They were 4th in the short program but fell to 7th after making a number of mistakes in their free skate. She said of their result, "We kind of let ourselves down, so we're a little upset with that. But we'll learn from it." She also noted that the ice in the arena was hard, which made it difficult to skate on. In the singles competition, she was 18th in the compulsory figures. She later climbed to 10th place and met her personal goal of placing in the top 12. Coull said that she thought she had shown it was possible for skaters to compete in two disciplines at once.

=== 1985–1986 season ===
In September, Coull again competed at the St. Ivel International in single skating. She was second after the short program, but in her free skate, she doubled a triple Salchow jump and fell on another triple, and she fell to 4th place. While she and Rowsom were slated to compete at both Skate America and Skate Canada, they withdrew after he suffered pulled groin and abductor muscles from doing flying camel spins. She competed as a singles skater at the NHK Trophy in November, a competition that did not include figures. She won silver, a result that she expressed joy about: "I wanted to win a medal here and that's what I did."

Rowsom's injury prevented them from training together for twelve weeks, though he recovered in time to compete at the Canadian Championships. Coull also suffered a cold ahead of the Championships. They were third in the pairs short program, and Rowsom said he would avoid jumps that took off from his injured leg as he was still recovering. Their free skate, however, was stronger, and they rose to win a second consecutive gold medal. In singles skating, Coull was 12th in the compulsory figures, a result that rival Elizabeth Manley said "shocked" her. She placed stronger in the short program and free skate, 6th and 3rd respectively, and finished in 6th place.

Coull was assigned to compete in pairs at the 1986 World Championships, where she and Rowsom hoped to medal with more consistent throw jumps. They were 4th after the short program. After a strong free skate, they moved up past the third-place Soviet pair, Larisa Selezneva and Oleg Makarov, to win the bronze medal. Coull said she was so focused on performing cleanly that she did not enjoy the program itself, but that she was "thrilled" about their medals.

=== 1986–1987 season ===
In June, it was announced that Coull would concentrate on pairs rather than continuing in both disciplines. Assigned to Skate Canada, they unexpectedly won, upsetting the reigning World champions Ekaterina Gordeeva and Sergei Grinkov after Gordeeva fell three times. In February 1987, at the Canadian Championships, they won a third straight title. Their free skate was set to music by Riccardo Drigo.

They competed at the 1987 World Championships held in Cincinnati. In the short program, they placed 4th. Their choice of music for the short program was discussed as something that may have held them back with the judges; they skated to a piece by Maurice Ravel. Coull called their program "very abstract" and "skating silently". Rowsom chose the piece in response to prior criticism that the pair did not have their own style and were too conventional. At the Championships, many other pairs chose upbeat music such as Dixieland jazz to play to the local audience. In their free skate, Coull fell on their first throw jump, and they made several other mistakes. They finished in 6th place. Coull said afterward, "I just hope people realize that sometimes we make mistakes or things don't quite work out, no matter how much we train and practise."

In May, it was announced that Coull and Rowsom had ended their partnership, as Rowsom was still suffering pain from his groin injury. He had received surgery but was recovering too slowly to compete the next season, and so he retired. Coull said she would continue skating in singles. However, she did not train for more than a few weeks before deciding to retire from competition as well. She later said she was "a total mess" after her retirement. When asked about the 1988 Winter Olympics, she said that she did not think she would watch it.

== Post-competitive career ==
In 1991, Coull spent four months touring with an ice show in Mexico. Having enjoyed the experience despite the poor quality of the temporary rinks set up for the shows, she auditioned for other shows. In December, she began touring with Disney on Ice. She played Princess Jasmine in the company's Aladdin shows, performing with her childhood friend Jaimee Eggleton. She skated professionally for about a decade.

== Personal life ==
Coull has two siblings and was raised in the Roman Catholic faith. She studied sports medicine at the University of Guelph. She later studied microbiology and immunology at McGill University, and graduated in 1991. Coull also coached while studying after her retirement from competition. As of 2016, she lived in Boston.

In 1987, Greenfield Park named its ice arena, rebuilt in 1986, after Coull, which she described as a "great honor". She and Rowsom were inducted in the Skate Canada Hall of Fame in 2011 and the Cambridge Sports Hall of Fame in 2016.

== Results ==
=== Ladies' singles ===
International
Event	82–83	83–84	84–85	85–86
World Championships			10th	
NHK Trophy			7th	2nd
Skate America		5th		
Skate Canada International			8th	
National
Canadian Championships	3rd	3rd	2nd	6th

=== Pairs with Rowsom ===
International
Event	82–83	83–84	84–85	85–86	86–87
World Championships	9th	7th	7th	3rd	6th
NHK Trophy			3rd		
Skate America	4th				
Skate Canada International			2nd		1st
National
Canadian Championships	2nd	3rd	1st	1st	1st
