= Michael Seibert (figure skater) =

American figure skater (born 1960)

Personal information
- Born: January 1, 1960 (age 66) Pittsburgh, Pennsylvania, U.S.

Figure skating career
- Country: United States
Medal record
Figure skating: Ice dancing
Representing the United States
World Championships
| Bronze medal – third place | 1985 Tokyo | Ice dancing |
| Bronze medal – third place | 1984 Ottawa | Ice dancing |
| Bronze medal – third place | 1983 Helsinki | Ice dancing |

Michael Seibert (born January 1, 1960) is an American figure skating choreographer and former competitive ice dancer. With Judy Blumberg, he is a three-time World bronze medalist (1983 – 85), the 1980 Skate Canada International champion, the 1981 Skate America champion, and a five-time U.S. national champion (1981 – 85). They also competed at two Winter Olympics. In 2003, Seibert was one of the winners of the Primetime Emmy Award for Outstanding Choreography.

== Personal life ==
Seibert was born on January 1, 1960, in Pittsburgh, Pennsylvania. His father was a high school principal.

Seibert moved from Washington, Pennsylvania, to Colorado Springs, Colorado around,1978. By the early 1980s, he was living in New York City. He moved to Palm Springs, California, in the 2000s, but had returned to New York state by 2016.

== Career ==
Although he started skating in the first grade, Seibert began taking formal lessons only at age 13. Seen as too old for single skating, he decided to train in ice dancing. He had one early partnership.

=== Partnership with Blumberg ===
Seibert met Judy Blumberg at the 1977 U.S. Championships in Hartford, Connecticut. They soon tried out successfully but delayed the partnership for a year and a half until they had both relocated to Colorado Springs, Colorado. In 2014, recalling the start of their partnership, Blumberg stated, "I knew this would be the boy I would skate with. You know when you move similarly to someone, when your knees work with someone."

In 1979, Blumberg/Seibert were awarded the bronze medal at their first U.S. Championships, having finished third behind Stacey Smith / John Summers and Carol Fox / Richard Dalley. The following year, they passed Fox/Dalley to take the silver medal behind Smith/Summers at the 1980 U.S. Championships in Atlanta. They were included in the U.S. team to the 1980 Winter Olympics in Lake Placid, New York. After placing 7th at the Olympics, the two concluded their season with a 6th-place result at the 1980 World Championships in Dortmund, West Germany.

Blumberg/Seibert began the 1980 – 81 season with gold at the 1980 Skate Canada International, ahead of British duo Karen Barber / Nicky Slater. They then outscored Fox/Dalley to win the first of five straight U.S. national titles, at the 1981 U.S. Championships in San Diego, and ranked fourth at the 1981 World Championships in Hartford.

In the 1981 – 82 season, the duo obtained gold at the 1981 Skate America and the 1982 U.S. Championships in Indianapolis. They finished fourth at the 1982 World Championships in Copenhagen, Denmark. At the 1983 World Championships in Helsinki, they won the first of three consecutive World bronze medals. Their skating-related expenses, $50,000 per year, were mainly covered by their families until the 1983 – 84 Olympic season, when they received funding from the United States Olympic Committee, U.S. Figure Skating, one corporate, and several private sponsors.

Blumberg/Seibert finished fourth at the 1984 Winter Olympics in Sarajevo, Yugoslavia. They had ranked third in the compulsory and original dances before being overtaken by Marina Klimova / Sergei Ponomarenko of the Soviet Union. The Italian judge, Cia Bordogna, scored them lower in the free dance than other judges, saying later that she considered their music unsuitable for ice dancing.

Blumberg/Seibert agreed in early September 1984 to compete one more season as amateurs. They were initially coached by Bobby Thompson in London and then by Claire O'Neill Dillie in Pittsburgh and New York City. The two won their fifth national title in Kansas City, Missouri, and then bronze at the 1985 World Championships in Tokyo, Japan.

Blumberg and Seibert performed in several Champions on Ice tours in the early 1980s. They won the 1988 World Professional title. They parted ways in 1992. Although Blumberg wanted to continue performing together, Seibert decided to end their partnership in order to pursue other interests.

=== Later career ===
Seibert decided to focus on choreography and directing for ice shows. A long-time choreographer for Stars on Ice, in 2003, he won a Primetime Emmy Award for Outstanding Choreography along with Sandra Bezic, A.C. Ciulla, Christopher Dean, and Jamie Isley. He was also an assistant choreographer for Carmen on Ice. Seibert worked on Battle of the Blades in Toronto in 2009-11 and 2013; he was involved in coaching, choreography, and the overall production.

Seibert has also worked as an interior designer and as a real estate agent at Houlihan Lawrence. His New York and California residences, both of which he designed, were featured in Elle Decor, Metropolitan Home, and Interior Design.

== Programs ==
| Season | Original set pattern | Free dance |
|---|---|---|
| 1984 – 85 | | Fire on Ice by Joel Silverman |
| 1983 – 84 | Carmen by Georges Bizet | Scheherazade by Nikolai Rimsky-Korsakov choreo. by Georgina Parkinson |
| 1982 – 83 | | |
| 1981 – 82 | | Dancing in the Dark by Arthur Schwartz; Puttin' On the Ritz by Irving Berlin |
| 1980 – 81 | | Boogie disco; Tango; March |
| 1979 – 80 | | Malagueña by Ernesto Lecuona |

== Results ==
with Blumberg

International
| Event | 78–79 | 79–80 | 80–81 | 81–82 | 82–83 | 83–84 | 84–85 |
|---|---|---|---|---|---|---|---|
| Olympics | | 7th | | | | 4th | |
| World Champ. | | 6th | 4th | 4th | 3rd | 3rd | 3rd |
| Skate America | | 4th | | 1st | | | |
| Skate Canada | | | 1st | | | | |
National
| U.S. Champ. | 3rd | 2nd | 1st | 1st | 1st | 1st | 1st |
