= Sandra Cariboni =

Swiss figure skater

Personal information
- Born: 17 November 1963 (age 62) Zofingen, Switzerland
- Height: 1.71 m (5 ft 7 1/2 in)

Figure skating career
- Country: Switzerland
- Skating club: ISC Davos
- Retired: c. 1986

Sandra Cariboni (born November 17, 1963) is a Swiss former competitive figure skater in ladies' singles. She is the 1983 Swiss Championships champion and finished 11th at the 1984 Winter Olympics.

== Personal life ==
Sandra Cariboni was born on November 17, 1963, in Zofingen, Switzerland. She is the daughter of architects Dino and Rita Carboni, the latter of whom also worked as a skating coach. She also has a sister, Claudia. After being diagnosed with Krupp syndrome as an infant, her family moved to Davos.

Cariboni studied to become a veterinarian before becoming a homeopath in Zürich. She and her partner, Hans Gerber, have a son, Zeno, born in 2009.

== Career ==
Cariboni became the Swiss national junior champion at the age of 13. In 1982, she competed at her first major international event, the World Championships in Copenhagen, and finished 16th.

The following season, she placed seventh at the 1982 Skate America and 13th at the 1982 NHK Trophy before winning the Swiss senior national title. She finished 13th at the 1983 European Championships in Dortmund and tenth at the 1983 World Championships in Helsinki.

Cariboni's most successful season was 1983–84. She placed sixth at the 1984 European Championships in Budapest, eleventh at the 1984 Winter Olympics in Sarajevo, and tenth at the 1984 World Championships in Ottawa.

In 1985, Cariboni placed eleventh at the European Championships in Gothenburg and 17th at the World Championships in Tokyo. After a long pause due to a knee injury, she lacked the motivation to return to competitive skating and retired. She was a member of the Internationale Schlittschuh-Club in Davos.

Cariboni worked for two years as a skating coach at the Suvretta House in St. Moritz.

== Competitive highlights ==
International
Event	81–82	82–83	83–84	84–85
Winter Olympics			11th	
World Championships	16th	10th	10th	17th
European Championships	13th	13th	6th	11th
NHK Trophy		13th		
Skate America		7th		
National
Swiss Championships	2nd	1st	2nd	2nd
