= Judy Blumberg =

American ice dancer (born 1957)

Personal information
- Full name: Judith Ann Blumberg
- Born: September 13, 1957 (age 68) Santa Monica, California, U.S.

Figure skating career
- Country: United States
Medal record
Figure skating: Ice dancing
Representing the United States
World Championships
Bronze medal – third place	1985 Tokyo	Ice dancing
Bronze medal – third place	1984 Ottawa	Ice dancing
Bronze medal – third place	1983 Helsinki	Ice dancing

Judith Ann Blumberg (born September 13, 1957) is an American former competitive ice dancer. With Michael Seibert, she is a three-time World bronze medalist (1983–85), the 1980 Skate Canada International champion, the 1981 Skate America champion, and a five-time U.S. national champion (1981–85).

== Personal life ==
Blumberg was born in Santa Monica, California, and is Jewish. She is the daughter of a clothing manufacturer and grew up in Tarzana, California.

She majored in special education at California State University, Northridge. She adopted a girl, Etienne. Her daughter was born c. 2006.

== Career ==
On the ice from the age of ten, Blumberg trained nearly three hours every morning and a few more hours following school in Tarzana, California. She switched from singles to ice dancing when she was around 19 years old and had one early partnership.

=== Partnership with Seibert ===
Blumberg met Michael Seibert at the 1977 U.S. Championships in Hartford, Connecticut. They soon tried out successfully but delayed the partnership for a year and a half until they had both relocated to Colorado Springs, Colorado. In 2014, recalling the start of their partnership, Blumberg stated, "I knew this would be the boy I would skate with. You know when you move similar to someone, when your knees work with someone."

In 1979, Blumberg/Seibert were awarded the bronze medal at their first U.S. Championships, having finished third behind Stacey Smith / John Summers and Carol Fox / Richard Dalley. The following year, they passed Fox/Dalley to take the silver medal behind Smith/Summers at the 1980 U.S. Championships in Atlanta. They were included in the U.S. team to the 1980 Winter Olympics in Lake Placid, New York. After placing 7th at the Olympics, the two concluded their season with a 6th-place result at the 1980 World Championships in Dortmund, West Germany.

Blumberg/Seibert began the 1980–81 season with gold at the 1980 Skate Canada International, ahead of British duo Karen Barber / Nicky Slater. They then outscored Fox/Dalley to win the first of five straight U.S. national titles, at the 1981 U.S. Championships in San Diego, and ranked fourth at the 1981 World Championships in Hartford.

In the 1981–82 season, the duo obtained gold at the 1981 Skate America and the 1982 U.S. Championships in Indianapolis. They finished fourth at the 1982 World Championships in Copenhagen, Denmark. At the 1983 World Championships in Helsinki, they won the first of three consecutive World bronze medals. Their skating-related expenses, $50,000 per year, were mainly covered by their families until the 1983–84 Olympic season when they received funding from the United States Olympic Committee, U.S. Figure Skating, one corporate and several private sponsors.

Blumberg/Seibert finished fourth at the 1984 Winter Olympics in Sarajevo, Yugoslavia. They had ranked third in the compulsory and original dances before being overtaken by Marina Klimova / Sergei Ponomarenko of the Soviet Union. The Italian judge, Cia Bordogna, scored them lower in the free dance than other judges, saying later that she considered their music unsuitable for ice dancing.

Blumberg/Seibert agreed in early September 1984 to compete one more season as amateurs. They were initially coached by Bobby Thompson in London and then by Claire O'Neill Dillie in Pittsburgh and New York City. The two won their fifth national title, in Kansas City, Missouri, and then bronze at the 1985 World Championships in Tokyo, Japan.

Blumberg and Seibert performed in several Champions on Ice tours in the early 1980s. They won the 1988 World Professional title. They parted ways in 1992. Although Blumberg wanted to continue performing together, Seibert decided to end their partnership in order to focus on choreography and directing.

=== Later career ===
In 1992, Blumberg teamed up with Jim Yorke and skated professionally with him for 3½ years. She was inducted into the U.S. Figure Skating Hall of Fame in 1996. In January 2014, she was inducted into the Southern California Jewish Sports Hall of Fame.

Blumberg has worked as a figure skating commentator for CBS Sports, the ensemble director for the Ice Theatre of New York, and a skating coach in Sun Valley, Idaho. She has also appeared as a motivational speaker and as an ISU Technical Specialist.

== Programs ==
Season	Original set pattern	Free dance
1984–85		Fire on Ice by Joel Silverman
1983–84	Carmen by Georges Bizet	Scheherazade by Nikolai Rimsky-Korsakov choreo. by Georgina Parkinson
1982–83		
1981–82		Dancing in the Dark by Arthur Schwartz; Puttin' On the Ritz by Irving Berlin
1980–81		Boogie disco; Tango; March
1979–80		Malagueña by Ernesto Lecuona

== Results ==
with Seibert

International
Event	78–79	79–80	80–81	81–82	82–83	83–84	84–85
Olympics		7th				4th	
World Champ.		6th	4th	4th	3rd	3rd	3rd
Skate America		4th		1st			
Skate Canada			1st				
National
U.S. Champ.	3rd	2nd	1st	1st	1st	1st	1st

== See also ==
- List of notable Jewish figure skaters
