= Robert Bradshaw (figure skater) =

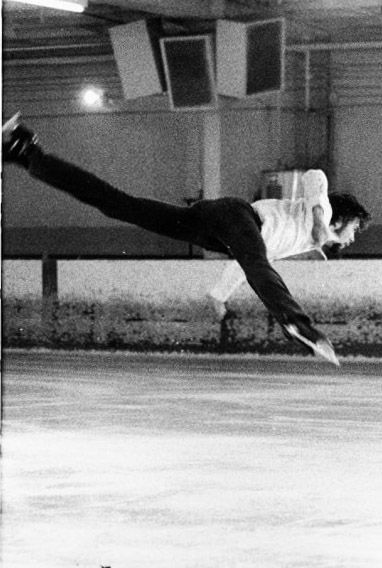

Personal information
- Born: October 8, 1954 Los Angeles, California, U.S.
- Died: March 27, 1996 (aged 41) Elverta, California, U.S.

Figure skating career
- Country: United States
- Discipline: Men's singles
- Coach: Frank Carroll
- Retired: 1973

Robert Bradshaw (October 8, 1954 – March 27, 1996) was an American figure skater. He won gold medals at the 1972 Nebelhorn Trophy and International St. Gervais. He placed 12th at the 1973 World Championships.

== Early years ==
Robert Bradshaw was born to Bob and Freda Bradshaw in Los Angeles, California. He and his brother Dennis grew up in Sherman Oaks, California.

Bradshaw married Maralee Marrs on Nov 18, 1972. Together they had a son, Dennis Bradshaw (Den Bradshaw). In addition to his skating career, he was also a master jeweler and created "Frith and Bradshaw Jewelers" with his partner Larry Frith. Bradshaw died from cancer on March 27, 1996.

== Skating career ==
Bradshaw decided to become a figure skater at the age of eight. He was coached by Frank Carroll at Van Nuys Iceland in the San Fernando Valley. He won the silver medal in men's singles at the 1973 U.S. Figure Skating Championships. He was an alternate on the U.S. men's Olympic figure skating team. Serious tendinitis in both of his knees and a motorcycle accident forced him to turn professional.

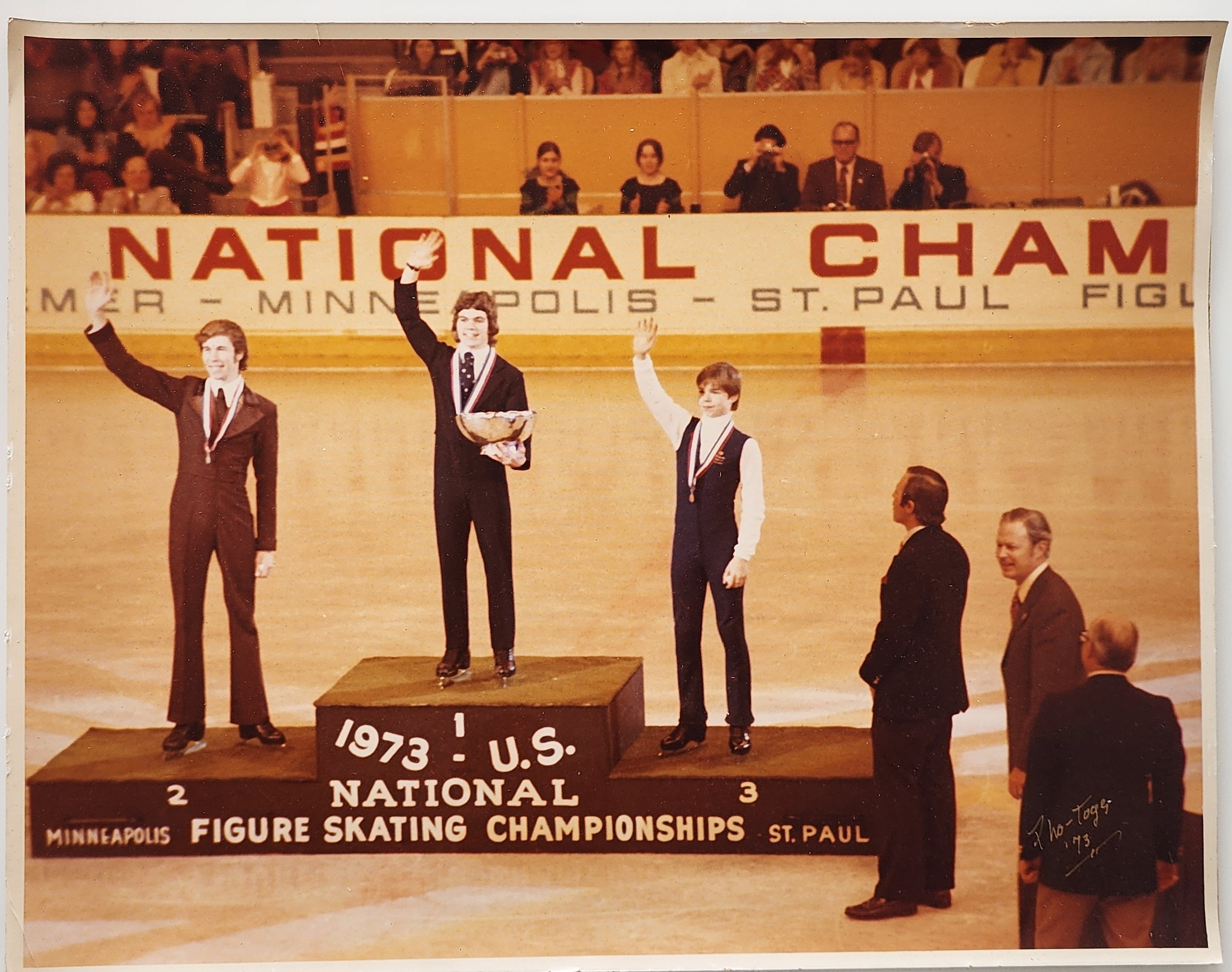
Robert Bradshaw winning 2nd place in the 1973 US National Men's Figure Skating Championships

Bradshaw was the first figure skater to successfully perform a double axel jump initiated and performed with the arms folded in competition. This variation of the Axel requires significant height to be able to complete the rotations, rather than the more common technique of performing a lower jump with very fast rotation generated by pulling the arms into the body.

After retiring from competition, Bradshaw began teaching at Van Nuys Iceland before being offered a position as head coach at Squaw Valley Olympic Training Center in Tahoe. After moving his family to Truckee and teaching at Squaw for approximately one year, the former site of the 1960 Winter Olympics roof collapsed after the maintenance company in charge of removing the snow from the building's roof failed to maintain the building. Bradshaw moved to Sacramento, California and became head coach at Birdcage Ice Arena in Citrus Heights.

== Results ==
Event	1969–70	1970–71	1971–72	1972–73
World Championships				12th
Nebelhorn Trophy				1st
St. Gervais			2nd	1st
U.S. Championships	9th		5th	2nd
