= Kay Thomson =

Canadian figure skater (born 1964)

Personal information
- Born: February 18, 1964 (age 62) Toronto, Ontario
- Height: 1.60 m (5 ft 3 in)

Figure skating career
- Country: Canada
- Skating club: The Granite Club
- Retired: 1984

Kay Thomson (born February 18, 1964) is a Canadian former figure skater who competed in ladies' singles. She is the 1981 Prize of Moscow News champion, the 1983 Skate Canada International silver medallist (behind that years Olympic and World Champion Katarina Witt), and a three-time Canadian national champion. Her rise to dominance of Canadian ladies figure skating was unexpected as young phenom Tracy Wainmann had been expected to dominate Canadian ladies skating throughout this quadrennial, and beyond, but Thomson dethroned Wainmann at the 1982 Canadian Championships, and was only challenged by rising future superstar Elizabeth Manley thereafter as Wainmann fell off the map for a few years with personal issues and a growth spurt. She represented Canada at the 1984 Winter Olympics in Sarajevo, placing 12th, and at three World Championships, achieving her best result, fifth, in 1984 (Ottawa). She also finished a strong 6th at both the 82 and 83 worlds. At this event she had perhaps her best shot ever of a world podium finish in a heavily weakened post Olympic field (missing amongst other Rosalynn Sumners, Tiffany Chin, Claudia Leistner, and Elena Vodorezova) and a respectable initial finish in compulsory figures which were never her strength, but a turn between her triple lutz-double toe combination in the short, and a miss on her triple flip in the long, was enough to keep her behind silver medallist Anna Kondrashova, bronze medallist Elaine Zayak, and 4th-place finisher Kira Ivanova.

During her competitive career, Thomson was known as a particularly strong spinner. Her spins included an unusual back layback, performed on the opposite foot than a normal layback spin. Kay in fact had 3 or 4 unique versions of the layback, performed by no other competitor, and often included each one in her long programs, as well as a unique crossfoot version of the scratch spin. Thomson was also one of the first female skaters to regularly include the triple Lutz jump in her programs, and the first ever to complete a triple lutz-double toe combination in a short program. Despite having a triple lutz, and sometimes a triple flip, she was ever unable to master the standard easier triples of the time- triple salchow, triple toe, and triple loop, which most of the leading female contenders at the time had, which held her back on the international stage. With strong choreography and musical interpretation, Kay was known as a very strong all around skater, and despite failing to reach a world or Olympic podium is often credited as one of those (along with Elizabeth Manley and Tracy Wainmann) who brought Canadian ladies skating back to prominence after a few years of heavily middling results after the retirements of Karen Magnussen and Lynn Nightingale.

== Results ==
International
Event	1978-79	1979-80	1980–81	1981–82	1982–83	1983–84
Winter Olympics						12th
World Champ.				8th	7th	5th
Skate America				5th		
Skate Canada						2nd
Prize of Moscow News				1st		
International: Junior
World Junior Champ.	6th	2nd				
National
Canadian Champ.	1st J		2nd	1st	1st	1st
J = Junior
