= Mark Cockerell =

American figure skater

Personal information
- Full name: Mark Wayne Cockerell
- Born: April 24, 1962 (age 64) Burbank, California, U.S.
- Height: 5 ft 5 in (1.65 m)

Figure skating career
- Country: United States
- Discipline: Men's singles
- Retired: 1985
Medal record
World Junior Championships
Gold medal – first place	1976 Megève	Men's singles

Mark Wayne Cockerell (born April 24, 1962) is a former American figure skater. He is the 1976 World Junior champion, the 1978 Nebelhorn Trophy silver medalist, and a three-time U.S. senior national medalist (bronze in 1983 and in 1984, silver in 1985).

== Personal life ==
Cockerell was born April 24, 1962, in Burbank, California. He was married to Soviet figure skater Elena Kvitchenko, with whom he has a son and a daughter. He later married a former student immediately after she turned 18. He now lives in Nevada.

== Career ==
Cockerell won gold at the World Junior Championships in the event's inaugural year, 1976. After moving up to the senior level, he won silver at three international competitions – the 1978 Nebelhorn Trophy in West Germany, 1978 Grand Prix International St. Gervais in France, and 1980 Ennia Challenge Cup in the Netherlands.

Cockerell won his first senior national medal, bronze, at the 1983 U.S. Championships. He finished 14th at the 1983 World Championships in Helsinki, Finland.

The following season, he won another national bronze medal and was named in the U.S. team to the 1984 Winter Olympics in Sarajevo, Yugoslavia. There, Cockerell became the first man to execute a triple-triple jump combination at the Olympics, and finished 13th overall after placing 18th in compulsory figures, 17th in the short program, and tenth in the free skate. Concluding his season, he placed 13th at the 1984 World Championships in Ottawa, Ontario, Canada.

Cockerell was awarded the silver medal at the 1985 U.S. Championships, having placed second to Brian Boitano. He finished 8th at the 1985 World Championships in Tokyo, Japan.

== Coaching ==
Cockerell has previously coached at Quad City Sports Center (now River's Edge) in Davenport, Iowa. In 2002, the Quad-City Times reported that he had stepped down from his position as a skating director following allegations that he had been living with his skaters and engaging in inappropriate relationships with them. He has spent time coaching in California, Florida, Ohio and Tennessee in addition to the Plex Hiwire Sports Center in Irmo, South Carolina. He began coaching at Reno Ice in Reno, Nevada, in spring 2023. His independent contract with Reno Ice was terminated on February 3, 2024, in response to sexual assault allegations.

=== Sexual abuse allegations ===
On February 8, 2024, Mark Cockerell was identified in a federal lawsuit filed by two South Carolina women against the coach and U.S. Figure Skating, alleging sexual abuse. The lawsuit claims that Cockerell's misconduct began in 2018 when one victim was 14, and asserts that earlier investigations could have prevented the abuse. A third victim came forward after the lawsuit was filed. Further lawsuits were filed by a fourth victim, who was under the age of 18 at the time of the abuse, and two mothers of victims. The lawsuits allege that Cockerell had been sexually abusing underage girls since the early 1990s. The types of abuse detailed include rape, inappropriate touching, sexual comments, grooming, and emotional abuse. Several victims said they had developed eating disorders as a result of bodyshaming comments made by Cockerell.

== Results ==
International
Event	75–76	77-78	78–79	79–80	80–81	81–82	82–83	83–84	84–85
Olympics								13th	
Worlds							14th	13th	8th
NHK Trophy							4th		
Challenge Cup					2nd				
Nebelhorn		2nd							
St. Gervais		2nd							
International: Junior
Junior Worlds	1st								
National
U.S. Champ.	2nd J	8th		8th		5th	3rd	3rd	2nd
J = Junior
