= Jenna Pittman Bracone =

American figure skater

Personal information
- Born: Nashville, TN

Figure skating career
- Country: United States

Jenna Pittman Bracone is an American figure skater. She was an International, and World Junior Team USA member. She trained under the following coaches: Scott Cudmore, John D'Amlio, Pauline Williams, Tracey Cahill Poletis, and Ron Ludington. She currently resides in New Jersey with her husband and two sons. She coaches at the Mennen Sports Arena rink in Morristown, New Jersey.

== Competitive highlights ==
International
Event	1991–92	1992–93	1993–94
World Junior Champ.			17th
International St. Gervais			1st
Gardena Spring Trophy		2nd J	
National
U.S. Championships	4th N	2nd J	WD
U.S. Olympic Festival		2nd	

== Education ==
Pittman attended Meredith College in Raleigh, North Carolina and received a BA in Political Science and Psychology.
