= Minto Skating Club =

- Formation: 1904
- Headquarters: Bryan Kilrea Arena
- Location: Ottawa, Ontario, Canada
- President: Josée Brisson
- Director: Darryl VanLuven
- Coaches: Anne-Marie Bergeron; Eric Loucks; Gordon Forbes; Tara McDougall; Gail Anne Ellis; Katrina Millard-VanLuven; Kristina Badour (Ruzhynska); Darryl VanLuven; Derek Schmidt; Joanne Hough
- Website: mintoskatingclub.com
- Remarks: Colors: Blue and Gold

The Minto Skating Club is a competitive figure skating club in Ottawa, Ontario, Canada, founded in 1904. The Club is a member of the Skate Canada figure skating organization in Canada, and was a founder of the predecessor organization to Skate Canada, the "Figure Skating Department" of the Amateur Skating Association of Canada in 1914.

Notable skaters who represented the club include Olympic and World champion Barbara Ann Scott and Olympic bronze medallist and World champion Don Jackson. Notable skaters include Melville Rogers, Lynn Nightingale, Kim Alletson, Gordon Forbes, and the dance teams of Isabelle Duchesnay / Paul Duchesnay and Chantal Lefebvre / Michel Brunet.

== History ==
The club was founded in 1904. The club's patron was the then Governor-General of Canada, Lord Minto, or Earl, and the Countess of Minto. Membership was drawn from the Rideau Skating Club. Skating was first held at the Governor-General's residence, Rideau Hall and soon moved to the Rideau Skating Rink. Skating was also held at the Dey's Arena in Ottawa.

In 1905, the first Canadian Skating Championships were held. Minto's Ormond B. Haycock is the first Canadian men's champion, and together with Katherine Haycock won the Canadian pairs championship. The pair would repeat in 1906. In 1908, Ormond Haycock and Aimee Haycock won the Canadian pairs' championship. Ormond Haycock would win two further pairs' titles with his partner Lady Evelyn Grey in 1910 and 1911.

In 1914, the club was a founding member of the new Figure Skating Department in the Amateur Skating Association of Canada, located in Ottawa. At the first "official" Canadian Championships, Minto's Muriel Maunsell was the ladies champion. Joachim Ribbentrop, then a young German living in Canada, competed for the club. He would later become the Foreign Minister of Nazi Germany.

In 1920 and 1922, Alden Godwin and Douglas Nelles skating out of Minto won the Canadian pairs' championship. In 1922, the Club moved to a new Rideau Rink on Waller Avenue in Ottawa. The Club subsequently took over the rink and renamed it the Minto Rink. In 1922 and 1923, Dorothy Jenkins out of Minto won the Canadian women's senior championship. In 1923, Melville Rogers won his first Canadian men's title, followed by wins from 1926–1928. In 1924, Elizabeth Blair and John Machado won the Canadian pairs' championship. In 1925, Gladys Rogers and Melville Rogers of Minto won the Canadian pairs' championship.

From 1933–1937, the team of Elmore Davis, Melville Rogers, Prudence Holbrook and Guy Owen won the Canadian fours' championship skating for Minto.

In 1948, the Club produced its first World champion, Barbara Ann Scott. Scott also won the gold medal at the 1948 Winter Olympics. In 1949, the Minto Rink was destroyed by fire, and the Club built a new rink on Henderson Avenue.

From 1955–1957, Carol Jane Pachl out of Minto won the Canadian women's senior championship. The Henderson Avenue rink was sold to the University of Ottawa in 1959.

Don Jackson won the bronze medal for figure skating at the 1960 Winter Olympics, and went on to win the 1962 World Figure Skating Championships. Jackson would later become a coach at Minto.

From 1974–1977, Lynn Nightingale skating out of Minto, won the Canadian women's senior championship. She placed ninth at the 1976 Winter Olympics and placed in the top ten at five world championships.

In 1986, the Club opened a new facility on Lancaster Road in Ottawa. In 1992 and 1993, the pairs team of Penny Mann and Juan-Carlos Noria won silver in the Canadian pairs championship. The pair of Jennifer Boyce and Michel Brunet skating out of Minto won silver in the Canadian pairs championships of 1994 and 1995. Brunet then formed a team with Chantal Lefebvre and won the silvers in four consecutive Canadian championships behind the champion team of Shae-Lynn Bourne and Victor Kraatz, and competed at the 1998 Winter Olympics.

== Notable skaters ==
- Barbara Ann Scott
- Don Jackson
- Joachim von Ribbentrop
- Melville Rogers
- Lynn Nightingale
- Kim Alletson
- Gordon Forbes
- Isabelle Duchesnay / Paul Duchesnay
- Chantal Lefebvre / Michel Brunet

Valerie Marcoux

== See also ==
- Canada at the 1948 Winter Olympics
- Canada at the 1960 Winter Olympics

== References and notes ==
- Bloch, Michael (1992). Ribbentrop. New York: Crown Publishing. ISBN 0-517-59310-6.
- Uren, Janet (2004). History Of The Minto Skating Club. Legas Publishing. ISBN 978-1894508568.
