= Jaimee Eggleton =

Canadian figure skater

Personal information
- Born: June 26, 1964 (age 62) Montreal, Quebec, Canada

Figure skating career
- Country: Canada
- Skating club: CPA St-Bruno

Jaimee Eggleton (born June 26, 1964 in Montreal) is a Canadian former competitive figure skater. He competed at the 1984 Winter Olympics.

== Career ==
In 1984, Eggleton won the junior men's title at the Canadian Figure Skating Championships, ahead of Marc Ferland, who had won silver at the World Junior Championships. Skate Canada officials had earlier decided to send the junior national champion to the 1984 Winter Olympics as a learning experience, and so Eggleton, at age 19, was sent to the Olympics as his first major international event, preempting veteran competitor Gordon Forbes, that year's bronze medalist. Eggleton later stated that Ferland was expected to be the junior national champion that year and that the experience rule was put into place for him. Eggleton placed 20th out of 23 competitors at the Olympics.

Eggleton won the bronze medal at the 1986 Canadian Championships.

== Competitive highlights ==
International
Event	83–84	84–85	85–86	86–87	87–88
Winter Olympics	20th				
World Champ.			20th		
International de Paris					5th
Skate America				13th	
Prize of Moscow News			12th		
National
Canadian Champ.	1st J	9th	3rd		
J = Junior level
