= Gordon Forbes (figure skater) =

Canadian figure skater

Personal information
- Born: c. 1959 (age 66–67)

Figure skating career
- Country: Canada
- Skating club: Minto Skating Club
- Retired: 1985

Gordon Forbes (born c. 1959) is a Canadian former competitive figure skater. He is the 1979 Nebelhorn Trophy champion, the 1979 Prague Skate champion, and a six-time Canadian national medallist (silver in 1980, bronze in 1979, 1981, 1983–85). He finished 9th at the 1984 World Championships in Ottawa and 17th at the 1985 World Championships in Tokyo. He is originally from Brockville and represented the Minto Skating Club. As of 2016, he works as a coach at the same club.

== Competitive highlights ==
International
Event	73–74	76–77	78–79	79–80	80–81	81–82	82–83	83–84	84–85
Worlds								9th	17th
Ennia Challenge				2nd					
Nebelhorn Trophy				1st					
NHK Trophy					8th				
Prague Skate				1st					
Skate America						8th		6th	
Skate Canada						WD			
St. Gervais				2nd					
National
Canadian Champ.	3rd N	2nd J	3rd	2nd	3rd		3rd	3rd	3rd
Levels – N: Novice; J: Junior; WD: Withdrew
