= Constanze Gensel =

German figure skater

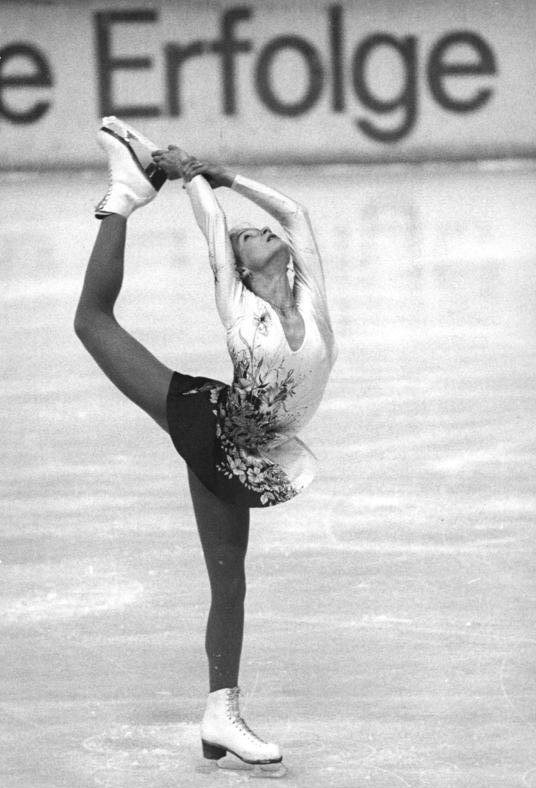
- Gensel at the East German Championships in 1983

Personal information
- Other names: Constanze Bauer
- Born: 1969 or 1970

Figure skating career
- Country: East Germany
- Retired: 1986

Constanze Bauer (née Gensel) is a German former competitive figure skater who represented East Germany. She is the 1984 Ennia Challenge champion, the 1985 Golden Spin of Zagreb champion, and a two-time East German national silver medalist. Gensel reached the top eight at two ISU Championships — the 1984 World Junior Championships and the 1986 European Championships. She achieved her highest World Championship placement, 11th, in 1985. She trained in Karl-Marx-Stadt (Chemnitz). Bauer later became a consultant at a bank.

== Competitive highlights ==
International
Event	1983–84	1984–85	1985–86
World Champ.	14th	11th	17th
European Champ.		12th	8th
Ennia Challenge		1st	
Golden Spin of Zagreb			1st
Prague Skate	3rd		
International: Junior
World Junior Champ.	8th		
National
East German Champ.	3rd	2nd	2nd
