= Boris Batanov =

Soviet footballer

Personal information
- Full name: Boris Alekseyevich Batanov
- Date of birth: 15 July 1934
- Place of birth: Moscow, USSR
- Date of death: 18 June 2004 (aged 69)
- Place of death: Moscow, Russia
- Height: 1.82 m (6 ft 0 in)
- Positions: Forward; midfielder

Youth career
- FC Spartak Moscow
- Metrostroy Moscow

Senior career*
Years	Team	Apps	(Gls)
1955–1957	SKChF Sevastopol	53	(11)
1958–1959	Zenit Leningrad	44	(11)
1960–1966	FC Torpedo Moscow	162	(34)
1967	Volga Gorky		

International career
1961	USSR	1	(0)

Managerial career
- 1969: FC Torpedo Moscow (assistant)
- 1971: FC Torpedo Moscow (assistant)
- 1975: FC Rubin Kazan
- 1977: Luch Vladivostok
- 1978: SC Tavriya Simferopol
- 1984: FC Torpedo Moscow (assistant)
- FC Rubin Kazan (assistant)
- 1978—1980: Moskvich Moscow
- 1981—1982: FC Dynamo Kashira
- * Club domestic league appearances and goals

Boris Alekseyevich Batanov (Russian: Борис Алексеевич Батанов; 15 July 1934 in Moscow – 18 June 2004 in Moscow) was a Soviet football player.

The father of figure skater Elena Batanova, father in law of hockey player Igor Larionov.

== Honours ==
- Soviet Top League winner: 1960, 1965.
- Soviet Cup winner: 1960.

== International career ==
Batanov played his only game for USSR on 18 June 1961 in a 1962 FIFA World Cup qualifier against Turkey (1:0).
