= Alexei Soloviev (ice dancer) =

Soviet ice dancer

Alexei Soloviev (Russian: Алексей Соловьёв) is a Soviet former ice dancer. He is a two-time (1980, 1981) World Junior champion with partner Elena Batanova. On the senior level, they won the 1982 NHK Trophy and 1984 Soviet national title. They were coached by Lyudmila Pakhomova and later Tatiana Tarasova.

== Results with Batanova ==
International
Event	1979–80	1980–81	1981–82	1982–83	1983–84	1984–85
Worlds				8th	7th	
NHK Trophy				1st		2nd
Moscow News			4th			
St. Ivel				3rd		
International: Junior
Junior Worlds	1st	1st				
National
Soviet Champ.				4th	1st	
