= Katherina Matousek =

Personal information
- Other names: Kateřina Matoušková
- Born: April 20, 1964 (age 62) Prague, Czechoslovakia
- Height: 1.60 m (5 ft 3 in)

Figure skating career
- Country: Canada
- Retired: 1985

Katherina Matousek (born as Kateřina Matoušková; April 20, 1964) is a former pair skater who competed for Canada. As a junior skater, she won a regional junior pairs title skating with Brad Starchuk. Early in her career, she also competed with Eric Thomsen. She joined forces with partner Lloyd Eisler in 1982. In 1984, they won the gold medal at the Canadian Championships and competed in the Olympics, finishing eighth. The next year they won the bronze medal at the 1985 World Championships. She retired on 14 May 1986 due to a stress fracture in her right ankle, and began working as a skating coach in North Vancouver.

== Results ==
=== With Lloyd Eisler ===
International
Event	1982–83	1983–84	1984–85
Winter Olympics		8th	
World Championships	10th	5th	3rd
NHK Trophy			4th
Skate America	6th	5th	
Skate Canada			3rd
International St. Gervais	2nd		
Nebelhorn Trophy	2nd		
National
Canadian Championships	3rd	1st	

=== With Eric Thomsen ===
International
Event	1979–80	1980–81	1981–82
NHK Trophy			5th
Skate America			6th
Ennia Challenge Cup	6th		
