= Susan Jackson (figure skater) =

British figure skater (born 1965)

Personal information
- Full name: Susan Ann Jackson
- Born: 30 November 1965 (age 60) Nottingham, England
- Height: 1.58 m (5 ft 2 in)

Figure skating career
- Country: Great Britain
- Retired: 1986

Susan Ann Jackson-Wagner (born 30 November 1965) is a British former competitive figure skater. She is a two-time British national champion (1984, 1985) in ladies' singles and competed at the 1984 Olympics, placing 17th. Jackson placed 12th at the 1984 World Championships in Ottawa and seventh at the 1986 European Championships in Copenhagen.

Since retiring from competition, Jackson-Wagner has been a longtime skating coach in Tennessee.

== Competitive highlights ==
International
Event	1982–83	1983–84	1984–85	1985–86
Winter Olympics		17th		
World Championships	19th	12th	13th	WD
European Championships	20th	14th	10th	7th
National
British Championships	3rd	1st	1st	2nd
WD = Withdrew
