= Claudia Leistner =

German figure skater

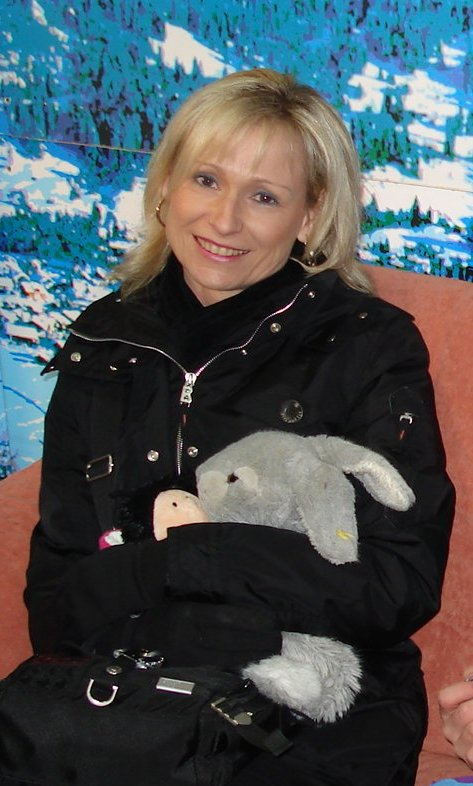
- Leistner in 2010

Personal information
- Born: 15 April 1965 (age 61) Ludwigshafen, West Germany
- Height: 1.69 m (5 ft 6 1/2 in)

Figure skating career
- Country: West Germany
- Retired: 1989
Medal record
Figure skating: Ladies' singles
Representing West Germany
World Championships
Silver medal – second place	1983 Helsinki	Ladies' singles
Silver medal – second place	1989 Paris	Ladies' singles
European Championships
Gold medal – first place	1989 Birmingham	Ladies' singles
Bronze medal – third place	1983 Dortmund	Ladies' singles
Bronze medal – third place	1985 Gothenburg	Ladies' singles

Claudia Pfrengle (née Leistner, born 15 April 1965) is a German former figure skater. She is a two-time World silver medalist and the 1989 European champion.

== Career ==
Leistner was a roller skater before taking up ice skating. In the 1981–82 season, she landed on the German senior national podium for the first time, taking the silver medal behind Manuela Ruben. Making her senior ISU Championship debut, she placed fifth at the 1982 European Championships in Lyon and fourth at the 1982 World Championships in Copenhagen.

With her outstanding jumping ability, she went on to become European champion in 1989 and a two-time silver medalist at the World Championships (1983 and 1989). She trained in Mannheim, initially being coached by Günter Zöller and later by Ondrej Nepela and Martin Skotnicky.

She represented West Germany (the Federal Republic of Germany and the Mannheimer ERC club.

== Personal life ==
Claudia Leister was born in Ludwigshafen, West Germany. She is married to Stefan Pfrengle, a German national pair skating champion. They have a daughter named Julia Pfrengle, who also competed in figure skating, and a son named Yannik.

== Results ==
International
Event	80–81	81–82	82–83	83–84	84–85	85–86	86–87	87–88	88–89
Olympics				9th				6th	
Worlds		4th	2nd		6th	6th	6th	4th	2nd
Europeans		5th	3rd		3rd	5th	4th	4th	1st
Skate America			2nd						1st
Skate Canada							2nd		
Trophée de France									1st
NHK Trophy	4th				4th				
National
German Champ.		2nd	2nd		1st	1st	1st	1st	1st
