= Karin Telser =

Italian figure skater

Karin Telser (born 23 April 1966) is a former figure skater who competed internationally for Italy and was the 1981-84 Italian champion. She was born in Tscherms, Italy.

== Results ==
International
Event	1976–77	1977–78	1978–79	1979–80	1980–81	1981–82	1982–83	1983–84
Winter Olympics								15th
World Championships						26th	16th	13th
European Championships					13th	18th	11th	8th
Nebelhorn Trophy								3rd
International: Junior
World Junior Championships	14th		15th					
National
Italian Championships					1st	1st	1st	1st
