= Christopher Dean =

English ice dancer (born 1958)

Sir Christopher Dean OBE
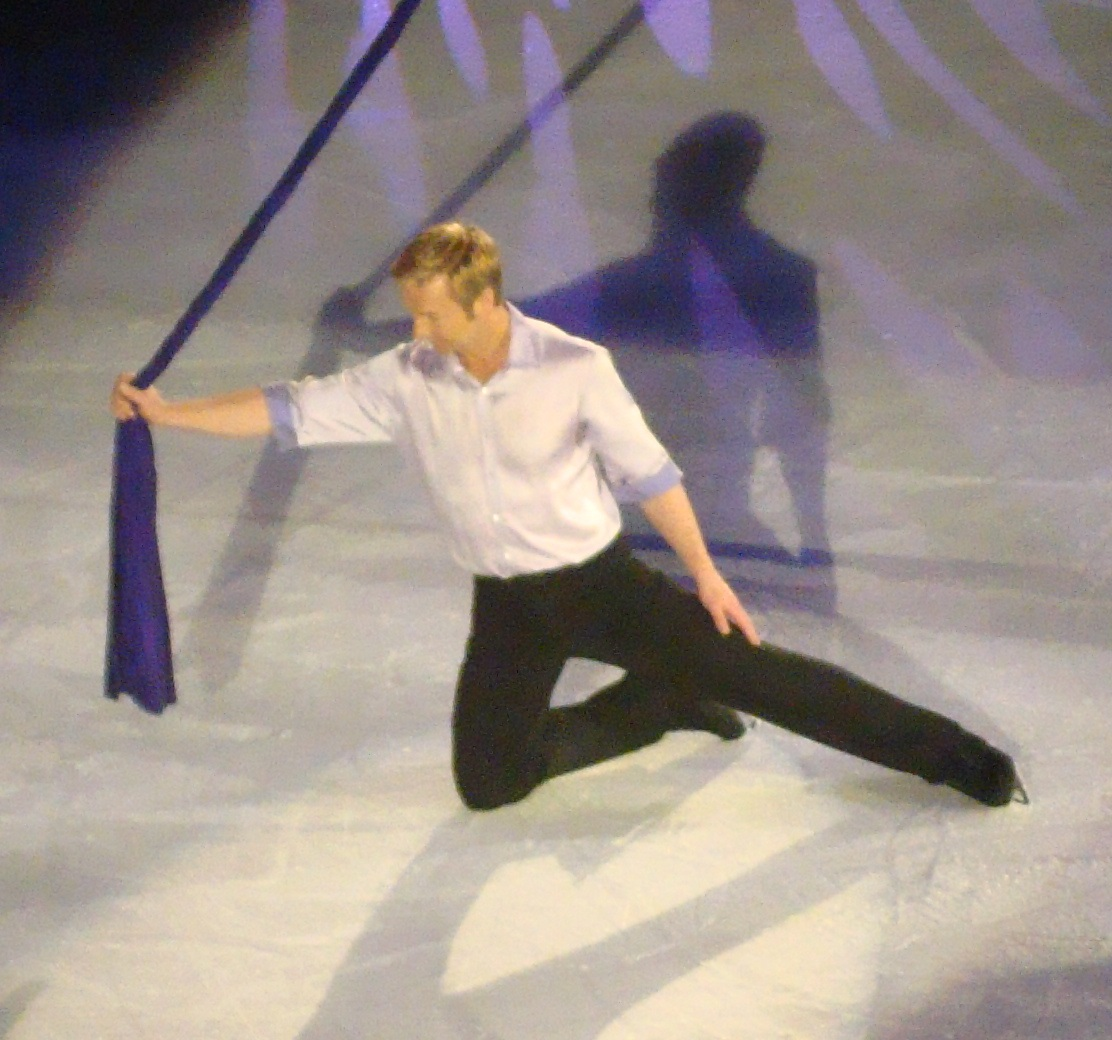
- Dean on the Dancing on Ice tour in Manchester, 2010

Personal information
- Born: Christopher Colin Dean; 27 July 1958 (age 68) Calverton, Nottinghamshire, England
- Height: 5 ft 10.5 in (1.79 m)
- Spouses: Isabelle Duchesnay (m. 1991; div. 1993); Jill Trenary (m. 1994; div. 2010); Karen Barber (m. 2026)

Figure skating career
- Country: Great Britain
- Retired: 1984, 1994
Medal record
Figure skating
Ice dancing
Representing Great Britain
Olympic Games
Gold medal – first place	1984 Sarajevo	Ice dancing
Bronze medal – third place	1994 Lillehammer	Ice dancing
World Championships
Gold medal – first place	1981 Hartford	Ice dancing
Gold medal – first place	1982 Copenhagen	Ice dancing
Gold medal – first place	1983 Helsinki	Ice dancing
Gold medal – first place	1984 Ottawa	Ice dancing
European Championships
Gold medal – first place	1981 Innsbruck	Ice dancing
Gold medal – first place	1982 Lyon	Ice dancing
Gold medal – first place	1984 Budapest	Ice dancing
Gold medal – first place	1994 Copenhagen	Ice dancing

Sir Christopher Colin Dean (born 27 July 1958) is a British ice dancer considered, with his skating partner, Jayne Torvill, amongst the greatest ice dancers of all time. The pair won a gold medal at the 1984 Winter Olympics and a bronze medal at the 1994 Winter Olympics. They were also four-time world and European champions and seven-time British champions.

== Early life ==
Christopher Colin Dean was born on 27 July 1958 and grew up in Calverton, Nottinghamshire. When he was aged six, his mother left and his father remarried. Dean never talked about this with his father or stepmother, both of whom have died. He regained contact with his mother.

From 1977 to 1980, he was a police constable with Nottinghamshire Police.

== Skating career ==
Dean began to skate at the age of 10 after he received a pair of skates as a Christmas present. His parents were keen ballroom dancers. At school he was captain of the football team and he saw ice skating as a sport that was athletic and graceful. Dean's first ice partner was Sandra Elson. They began skating together when he was 14 and competed as ice dancers for a few years under their instructor Len Sayward. However, despite becoming British Junior Dance champions, the team parted, as Dean and Elson did not get along well. Dean then agreed to practise with Jayne Torvill, another skater at the Nottingham rink. The pair were first coached by Janet Sawbridge but in 1978 Betty Callaway became their coach.

Dean left school at age 16 and joined the Nottingham Police Force in 1974. It was challenging for him to undergo police cadet training, as his schedule often clashed with his skating training sessions. Thus Torvill and Dean had to practise during his off-hours. These difficult times brought them closer and gave them a sense of discipline that was to prove vital throughout their career.

By 1980, Torvill and Dean had progressed to not only become British National Dance Champions but were in medal contention in international competitions as well. It was then that Dean made the decision that he could no longer balance his skating and police careers so he resigned from the police force. Torvill left her job soon after; this was made possible with a Nottingham City Council grant of £42,000.

Dean also served as the chief choreographer for the Torvill and Dean team.

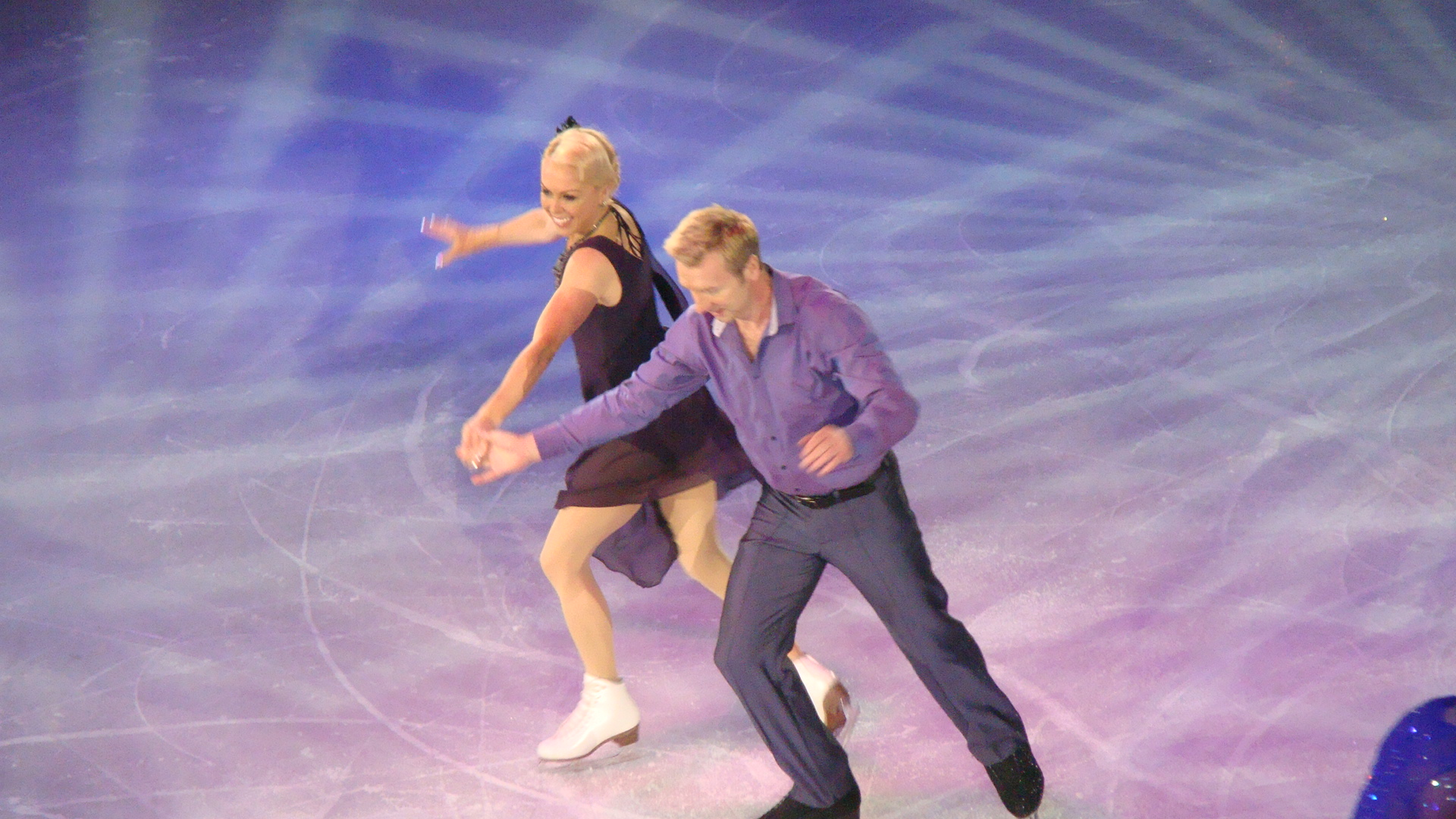
Torvill and Dean performing in 2011

Torvill and Dean's free programme at the 1984 Winter Olympics in Sarajevo, performed to the music of Maurice Ravel's Boléro, became world-famous. They received nine 6.0 marks for artistic impression, (three more for technical merit for a total of twelve 6.0 marks) the highest possible score and the only time ever that an all-perfect score was achieved at a Winter Olympics. It was one of the most popular achievements in the history of British sport, watched by a British television audience of 24 million people. Since the time limit was four minutes and ten seconds and their music was four minutes 28 seconds, they began on their knees and moved their bodies to the music for 18 seconds before starting to skate.

Torvill and Dean turned professional after their 1984 Olympic win. Under then existing Olympic Games rules as professionals they became ineligible to participate in Olympic competition. In 1993 the International Skating Union relaxed the rules for professional skaters, allowing the pair to participate in the 1994 Winter Olympics in Lillehammer where they won a bronze medal.

Torvill and Dean were admitted to the World Figure Skating Hall of Fame in 1989.

From January 2006 – 2023 Torvill and Dean participated in the ITV show Dancing on Ice. Each series ran from January to March with Torvill and Dean as "judges". The show then migrates to go on tour to arenas across the United Kingdom.

In January 2012 Dean said he was open to working with the National Ice Skating Association to help British competitive skating. Torvill and Dean were ambassadors for the 2012 European Figure Skating Championships in Sheffield, England. In February 2014, they visited Sarajevo for the 30th anniversary of the 1984 Olympics, and recreated their Bolero routine in the same arena where they won the gold.

In 2018 Dean choreographed the free programme of Aljona Savchenko and Bruno Massot, who won the gold medal in pair skating with a world record at the Winter Olympics in Pyeongchang.

== Competitive results ==
=== Amateur results ===
Event	75–76	76–77	77–78	78–79	79–80	80–81	81–82	82–83	83–84	93–94
Olympics					5th				1st	3rd
Worlds			11th	8th	4th	1st	1st	1st	1st	
Europeans			9th	6th	4th	1st	1st	WD	1st	1st
British Championships		4th	3rd	1st	1st	1st	1st	1st	1st	1st
NHK Trophy					2nd					
St Ivel International						1st	1st			
Oberstdorf		2nd	1st							
St Gervais		1st								
Morzine Trophy				2nd						
John Davis Trophy			1st							
Sheffield Trophy		1st								
Rotary Watches Competition				2nd						
Northern Championships	1st									
WD: Withdrew

=== Professional results ===
Event	1984	1985	1990	1994	1995	1996
World Professional Championships	1st	1st	1st		1st	1st
Challenge of Champions			1st		1st	1st
World Team Championship				3rd	1st	1st

== Professional programmes ==
	1984	1985	1990	1994	1995	1996
World Professional Championships	Song of India, Encounter	Diablo Tango, Venus	Oscar Tango, Revolution / Imagine	Encounter	Still Crazy After All These Years, Cecilia	Take Five, Hat Trick
Challenge of Champions			Echoes of Ireland		Still Crazy After All These Years, Cecilia	Take Five, Hat Trick
World Team Championships				Let's Face the Music, Encounter	Bridge Over Troubled Water, Cecilia	Sarabande, Hat Trick

== Amateur programmes ==
	OSP/ORD	Free Dance	Exhibitions
1978		The Great Waldo Pepper	
1979	Masquerade	Slaughter on Tenth Avenue	Evergreen
1980	A Little Street in Singapore	Sing Sing Sing etc.	Puttin' On the Ritz
1981	Cherry Pink (and Apple Blossom White)	Fame etc.	History of Love (version 1)
1982	Summertime	Mack and Mabel	The Hop, Kiss Me Kate, Fast Tap
1983	Rock n Roll	Barnum	Putting on the Ritz
1984	Capriccio Espagnol, Rimsky Korsakov	Boléro	I Won't Send Roses
1994	History of Love (version 2)	Let's Face the Music	Boléro

== Personal life ==
Between 1991 and 1993 Dean was married to French-Canadian World ice dance champion Isabelle Duchesnay, whom he met while choreographing for her and her brother Paul Duchesnay in the late 1980s.

On 15 October 1994, Dean married American skater Jill Trenary in Minneapolis, Minnesota. They had two sons and lived in Colorado Springs, Colorado. Dean's agent confirmed in March 2010 that the couple had separated. He and Trenary remain on good terms.

He has been in a relationship with Karen Barber since 2011. They were married in Scotland in March 2026.

Dean has also remained a close friend of his skating partner Jayne Torvill.

In 2021 Dean took part in an episode of DNA Journey to trace his family roots. He also appeared on The Masked Dancer as Beagle, where he was the fifth celebrity to be unmasked.

=== Honours ===
Dean was appointed an Honorary Freeman of the City of Nottingham in 1983.

He was appointed a Member of the Order of the British Empire (MBE) in the 1981 New Year Honours for services to ice dancing, promoted to Officer of the Order of the British Empire (OBE) in the 2000 New Year Honours for services to ice skating, and knighted in the 2026 New Year Honours for services to Ice Skating and to Voluntary Service.

== In popular culture ==
Dean was portrayed by Will Tudor in the 2018 ITV biopic Torvill & Dean.

== See also ==
- Torvill and Dean
