= Agnès Gosselin =

French figure skater

Personal information
- Born: 21 November 1967 (age 58) Caen, France
- Height: 1.60 m (5 ft 3 in)

Figure skating career
- Country: France
- Retired: 1988

Agnès Gosselin (born 21 November 1967) is a French former figure skater who competed in ladies' singles. She is a six-time French national champion (1983 to 1988) and competed at two Winter Olympics, in 1984 and 1988.

== Results ==
International
Event	82–83	83–84	84–85	85–86	86–87	87–88
Winter Olympics		18th				16th
World Champ.		17th	8th	13th	14th	
European Champ.	17th	9th	9th	9th	10th	7th
Skate America					3rd	
International de Paris						2nd
Prague Skate	1st					
National
French Champ.	1st	1st	1st	1st	1st	1st
