= John Thomas (figure skater) =

Canadian ice dancer

Personal information
- Full name: John Thomas
- Born: September 5, 1960 (age 65) Brampton, Ontario

Figure skating career
- Skating club: Granite Club; Woodbridge FSC

John Thomas (born September 5, 1960 in Brampton, Ontario) is a Canadian ice dancer. With partner Joanne French, he is the 1981 & 1982 Canadian Figure Skating Championships bronze medalist. With partner Kelly Johnson, he is the 1983 & 1984 Canadian silver medalist. Johnson and Thomas placed 12th at the 1984 Winter Olympics.

As of 2011, Thomas works as a skating coach at the Philadelphia Skating Club and Humane Society.

== Competitive highlights ==
(with Johnson)

Event	1982-83	1983-84	1984-85
Winter Olympic Games		12th	
World Championships	10th	11th	
Canadian Championships	2nd	2nd	
Skate America		2nd	
Skate Canada International			3rd
NHK Trophy			3rd
Golden Spin of Zagreb	4th		

(with French)

Event	1975-76	1976-77	1977-78	1978-79	1979-80	1980-81	1981-82
Canadian Championships	3rd N.	2nd J.	1st J.			3rd	3rd
Skate America							6th
Skate Canada International			10th			6th	
Nebelhorn Trophy				3rd			

- N = Novice level; J = Junior level
