= Cho Jae-hyung =

South Korean figure skater (born 1967)

Personal information
- Nationality: South Korean
- Born: 2 January 1967 (age 58)

Sport
- Sport: Figure skating

Cho Jae-hyung (born 2 January 1967) is a South Korean figure skater. He competed in the men's singles event at the 1984 Winter Olympics.

Cho finished 25th at the 1984 and 1985 Figure Skating World Championships.
