= Manuela Ruben =

German figure skater (born 1964)

Personal information
- Born: 14 January 1964 (age 62) Lauda-Königshofen, Baden-Württemberg, West Germany

Figure skating career
- Country: West Germany
- Retired: 1984
Medal record
Representing West Germany
Figure skating: Ladies' singles
European Championships
Silver medal – second place	1984 Budapest	Ladies' singles

Manuela Ruben (born 14 January 1964) is a German former figure skater who competed in ladies' singles for West Germany. She was the 1984 European silver medalist and three-time West German national champion (1982–84). She was placed seventh at the 1984 Winter Olympics and sixth at the 1984 World Championships.

She had hoped to contend for a medal at the Sarajevo Olympics after a strong 2nd place finish at that year's European Championships (ahead of the Olympic bronze medalist Kira Ivanova who placed only 4th) but mistakes in both the short and long knocked her out of contention. The same thing happen at the 1984 World Championships in a weakened field missing Rosalynn Sumners, Tiffany Chin, and Claudia Leistner.

== Results ==
International
Event	1978-79	1979-80	1980–81	1981–82	1982–83	1983–84
Winter Olympics						7th
World Championships			13th	15th	8th	6th
European Champ.			10th	14th	4th	2nd
NHK Trophy				11th		
Nebelhorn Trophy					1st	
International: Junior
Junior Worlds	2nd					
National
German Champ.		5th	2nd	1st	1st	1st
