= Elise Ahonen =

Finnish figure skater

Personal information
- Born: 1960s

Figure skating career
- Country: Finland
- Skating club: Helsingin taitoluisteluklubi
- Retired: c. 1986

Elise Ahonen (born in the 1960s) is a Finnish former competitive figure skater. She is a two-time Nordic medalist (1982 bronze, 1986 silver) and the 1985 Finnish national champion. She competed at ten ISU Championships; her best results included 10th at the 1983 World Junior Championships in Sarajevo, 14th at the 1985 European Championships in Gothenburg, and 15th at the 1985 World Championships in Tokyo. Her skating club was Helsingin taitoluisteluklubi in Helsinki.

== Competitive highlights ==
International
Event	80–81	81–82	82–83	83–84	84–85	85–86
World Champ.			21st	19th	15th	19th
European Champ.			22nd	15th	14th	15th
NHK Trophy					10th	
Nordics		3rd				2nd
International: Junior
World Junior Champ.	11th		10th			
National
Finnish Champ.					1st	
