= Margaret Crosland =

Canadian figure skater (1939–2024)

Personal information
- Other names: Margaret Berezowski, Margie Birdsell
- Born: July 27, 1939 Calgary, Canada
- Died: January 14, 2024 (aged 84) Calgary, Canada
- Home town: Calgary, Canada

Figure skating career
- Country: Canada
- Coach: Hans Gershcwiler
- Skating club: Winnipeg WC; Glencoe Club
- Began skating: 1946
- Retired: 1959

Margaret Crosland (July 27, 1939 – January 14, 2024) was a Canadian figure skater from Calgary, Alberta. She was the 1958 and 1959 Canadian national champion. She started skating at age 7, and was coached by the Swiss Olympian Hans Gerschwiler. She represented the Glencoe Club as a junior and the Winnipeg Winter Club as a senior.

Crosland graduated from the University of British Columbia. Later known as Margaret (Margie) Birdsell, she had a 50-year tenure as a figure skating judge and international figure skating referee. She judged five world figure skating championships and the 1984 Winter Olympics in Sarajevo.

She was recognized for helping Canadian skaters through encouragement and supporting the sport through fair judging. In 1978 she was awarded the Alberta Government Achievement Award as an outstanding Albertan. She was inducted into the Alberta Sports Hall of Fame in 1983.

Known as Margaret Crosland Berezowski, she was featured in a segment profiling Alberta Sports Hall of Fame inductees, where she reflected on her experience.

Crosland died in Calgary on January 14, 2024, at the age of 84.

== Results ==
International
Event	1955	1956	1957	1958	1959
World Championships			14th	13th	11th
North American Champ.			5th		6th
National
Canadian Championships	3rd J	1st J	3rd	1st	1st
J: Junior level
