= Masaru Ogawa =

Japanese figure skater

Japanese name
- Kanji: 小川勝
- Kana: おがわ まさる
Transcriptions
- Romanization: Ogawa Masaru

Masaru Ogawa
Personal information
- Born: October 12, 1964 (age 62) Tokyo, Japan

Figure skating career
- Country: Japan
- Retired: 1987

Masaru Ogawa (小川 勝, Ogawa Masaru; born October 12, 1964) is a Japanese former competitive figure skater. He is a four-time Japanese national champion and placed 14th at the 1984 Winter Olympics. After retiring from competition, he became a doctor of dental surgery.

== Results ==
International
Event	77–78	79–80	80–81	81–82	82–83	83–84	84–85	85–86	86–87
Olympics						14th			
Worlds					17th	14th	14th	10th	12th
Skate Canada						3rd	3rd		
NHK Trophy					5th		9th	4th	4th
Golden Spin					1st				
International: Junior
Junior Worlds	13th	13th							
National
Japan Champ.			3rd	3rd	3rd	1st	1st	1st	1st
