= Christoff Beck =

Austrian ice dancer

Personal information
- Born: 23 January 1964 (age 62) Vienna, Austria
- Height: 185 cm (6 ft 1 in)

Figure skating career
- Country: Austria
- Partner: Kathrin Beck
- Skating club: WEV Vienna
- Retired: 1988

Christoff Beck (born 23 January 1964) is an Austrian former competitive ice dancer from Vienna.

== Career and education ==
Competing with his sister, Kathrin Beck, he became the 1987 Winter Universiade champion, a two-time Skate Canada International medalist (silver in 1987, bronze in 1985), and a six-time Austrian national champion (1983–1988). They finished fifth at the 1988 Winter Olympics in Calgary, Canada. They trained six days a week, fifty weeks a year.

Beck studied law at the University of Vienna and opened his own law firm in 2002.

== Personal life ==
He has three sons.

== Results ==
(ice dance with Kathrin Beck)

International
Event	81–82	82–83	83–84	84–85	85–86	86–87	87–88
Winter Olympics							5th
World Champ.		16th	16th	9th	7th	6th	5th
European Champ.		15th	16th	6th	4th	4th	5th
Nebelhorn Trophy	9th						
NHK Trophy						3rd	
Schäfer Memorial							2nd
Skate America					5th		
Skate Canada					3rd		2nd
Universiade				3rd		1st	
National
Austrian Champ.		1st	1st	1st	1st	1st	1st
