= Petra Born =

German ice dancer

Personal information
- Born: 1 August 1965 (age 61) Zweibrücken, Rhineland-Palatinate, West Germany

Figure skating career
- Country: West Germany
Medal record
Figure skating
Ice dancing
Representing West Germany
European Championships
Bronze medal – third place	1985 Gothenburg	Ice dancing

Petra Born (born 1 August 1965 in Zweibrücken, Rhineland-Palatinate) is a German former ice dancer. With partner Rainer Schönborn, she was a three-time German national champion and the 1985 European bronze medalist. They placed 9th at the 1984 Winter Olympics. They represented the club ERCH Zweibrücken and later the club Würzburger ERV. Their coach was Martin Skotnicky.

== Results ==
(with Rainer Schönborn)

Event	1980-81	1981-82	1982-83	1983-84	1984-85
Winter Olympics				9th	
World Championships	21st	14th	9th	9th	5th
European Championships	16th	11th	6th	6th	3rd
German Championships	2nd	2nd	1st	1st	1st
Skate Canada International					2nd
