= Claudia Massari =

German figure skater

Personal information
- Nationality: German
- Born: 16 January 1966 (age 59); Garmisch-Partenkirchen, West Germany

Sport
- Sport: Figure skating

Claudia Massari (born 16 January 1966) is a German former figure skater. She competed in the pairs event at the 1984 Winter Olympics.
