= Kathrin Beck =

Austrian actress and former ice dancer

Personal information
- Born: 8 March 1966 (age 60) Vienna, Austria

Figure skating career
- Country: Austria
- Partner: Christoff Beck
- Skating club: WEV Vienna
- Retired: 1988

Kathrin Beck (born 8 March 1966, in Vienna) is an Austrian actress and former ice dancer. Competing with her brother, Christoff Beck, she became the 1987 Winter Universiade champion, a two-time Skate Canada International medalist (silver in 1987, bronze in 1985), and a six-time Austrian national champion (1983–1988). They finished fifth at the 1988 Winter Olympics in Calgary, Canada. They trained six days a week, fifty weeks a year.

After retiring from skating, Beck became an actress. She is a member of the Akademie des Österreichischen Films and Verband der Österreichischen FilmschauspielerInnen.

She married Christian Klikovits.

== Results ==
(ice dance with Beck)

International
| Event | 81–82 | 82–83 | 83–84 | 84–85 | 85–86 | 86–87 | 87–88 |
|---|---|---|---|---|---|---|---|
| Winter Olympics | | | | | | | 5th |
| World Champ. | | 16th | 16th | 9th | 7th | 6th | 5th |
| European Champ. | | 15th | 16th | 6th | 4th | 4th | 5th |
| Nebelhorn Trophy | 9th | | | | | | |
| NHK Trophy | | | | | | 3rd | |
| Schäfer Memorial | | | | | | | 2nd |
| Skate America | | | | | 5th | | |
| Skate Canada | | | | | 3rd | | 2nd |
| Universiade | | | | 3rd | | 1st | |
National
| Austrian Champ. | | 1st | 1st | 1st | 1st | 1st | 1st |
