= Lloyd Eisler =

Canadian pair skater (born 1963)

Personal information
- Born: April 28, 1963 (age 63) Seaforth, Ontario
- Height: 1.83 m (6 ft 0 in)
- Spouses: Marcia O'Brien (div. 2007) Kristy Swanson (m. 2009)

Figure skating career
- Country: Canada
- Partner: Isabelle Brasseur
- Coach: Josée Picard
- Retired: 1994
Medal record
Pairs' figure skating
Representing Canada
Olympic Games
| Bronze medal – third place | 1992 Albertville | Pairs |
| Bronze medal – third place | 1994 Lillehammer | Pairs |
World Championships
| Gold medal – first place | 1993 Prague | Pairs |
| Silver medal – second place | 1990 Halifax | Pairs |
| Silver medal – second place | 1991 Munich | Pairs |
| Silver medal – second place | 1994 Chiba | Pairs |
| Bronze medal – third place | 1985 Tokyo | Pairs |
| Bronze medal – third place | 1992 Oakland | Pairs |

Lloyd Edgar Eisler (born April 28, 1963) is a former Canadian pairs skater. With partner Isabelle Brasseur, he was the 1992 and 1994 Olympic bronze medallist and the 1993 World Champion.

== Early partnerships and success ==
Eisler first competed with Lori Baier. They won three consecutive Canadian Championship silver medals from 1980 to 1982 and competed at the 1982 World Figure Skating Championships, finishing in ninth place.

He competed with Katherina Matousek at the 1984 Winter Olympics, in which they finished in eighth place. They competed in three consecutive Worlds from 1983 to 1985 and won the Canadian Figure Skating Championships in 1984 and 1985. Their career highlight was a bronze medal at the 1985 World Figure Skating Championships, after which Matousek retired from the sport.

== Starting with Brasseur in 1987–1989 ==
Eisler competed with Karen Westby in 1986 and won a bronze medal at the Canadian Figure Skating Championships, missing out on the World team by one spot. At the time, there was strong speculation that Eisler would retire.

He partnered with Isabelle Brasseur in 1987 and they qualified for the Olympics and Worlds in 1988. They became Canadian champions in 1989 and went into the World Figure Skating Championships in Paris with high hopes of a medal in a weak and wide open field, but placed a disappointing seventh after two subpar, error-filled performances.

== Breakthrough in 1990 ==
Eisler and Brasseur had a disastrous performance in defense of their Canadian title in 1990, barely taking third place. They qualified for the 1990 World Figure Skating Championships by one judge over fourth-place finishers Michelle Menzies and Kevin Wheeler. They said afterwards that they likely would have retired had they missed the World team.

Facing modest expectations, the pair's performance in the short program landed them in fourth place at the 1990 World Figure Skating Championships in Halifax. They went on to win the silver medal in the long program, coming in behind Russian skaters Ekaterina Gordeeva and Sergei Grinkov who were awarded the gold on a 5–4 split.

== 1991–1992 ==
Brasseur and Eisler regained their Canadian title and went into the 1991 World Figure Skating Championships as the favorite. They handily won the short program, but the inspired free program of Natalia Mishkutionok and Artur Dmitriev to Franz Liszt's Liebesträume (Dream of Love), combined with a costly singled double axel by Eisler, garnered a silver medal on a 7-2 judges split.

After a spectacular long program at the 1992 Canadian Figure Skating Championships, Brasseur and Eisler competed in the 1992 Winter Olympics in Albertville, France. Their main competition was expected to be Mishkutionok and Dmitriev. Despite a fall by Brasseur on the side-by-side double axels in the short program, the pair were protected by the judges and placed third above top teams who had clean short programs, including Radka Kovarikova/Rene Novotny and Evgenia Shishkova/Vadim Naumov. The result put Brasseur and Eisler in position to automatically win the gold medal if they won the long program, but their long program was filled with major errors, including two falls and two other two-footed landings. They were awarded a controversial bronze medal on a 5–4 split ahead of Kovarikova and Novotny.

At the 1992 World Figure Skating Championships in Oakland, California, Brasseur and Eisler delivered a clean and spectacular short program to place second, but a flawed long program marred by two falls resulted in a bronze medal. Brasseur considered retirement, but the pair continued competing.

== World championship ==
Despite an inconsistent season, with the retirement of Miskutienok and Dmitriev and the disastrous season of world silver medalists Kovarikova and Novotny, Brasseur and Eisler went into the 1993 World Figure Skating Championships in Prague, Czech Republic as the favorites. They won the short program in a tight decision over Evgenia Shishkova and Vadim Naumov. Two of the favorites, European champions Marina Eltsova and Andrei Bushkov and hometown favorites Radka Kovarikova and Rene Novotny, made major errors and finished in fifth and sixth place respectively. A spectacular long program by Brasseur and Eisler, followed by a mistake by Shishkova and Naumov on the side-by-side triple toes, ensured the long-awaited Worlds victory for Brasseur and Eisler, gaining first place votes from all nine judges. They were praised for artistic improvements in their skating along with their renowned technical strength.

== Last amateur year 1994 ==
Despite being world champions, Brasseur and Eisler became the underdogs following the reinstatement of former Olympic champions Gordeeva and Grinkov and their longtime archrivals Mishkutionok and Dmitriev. At the 1994 Winter Olympics in Lillehammer, Norway, they made a strong bid for gold with clean short and long programs, but were barely able to fend off the young Russian team of Evgenia Shishkova and Vadim Naumov for the bronze medal, gaining it on a 5–4 split.

Brasseur and Eisler competed injured at the 1994 World Figure Skating Championships in Chiba, Japan and earned a silver medal. It was their last amateur outing.

Throughout their amateur career, Brasseur and Eisler were known as the team with the strongest lifts in the world and arguably the strongest double and triple twists in the world. They were noted particularly for a lift in which Eisler lifted Brasseur with one arm. Other pairs had lifts in which the male lifted the female with both hands and then let go with one, but theirs was unique in Eisler lifting Brasseur without ever touching her with his second hand.

== Professional career ==
Brasseur and Eisler had a distinguished professional career, winning many events, although they were never able to place higher than runner-up at the two most prominent events, the World Professional Championships in Landover, Maryland and the Challenge of Champions. They became fan favorites with inventive routines, including their gender-reversal routine to Chris De Burgh's "Patricia the Stripper". They also were popular show skaters, particularly in Canadian Stars on Ice and Champions on Ice, for many years.

== Coaching ban in Canada ==
Effective October 6, 2006, Eisler was suspended from coaching in Canada for a one-year period by Skate Canada after allegedly sending sexually suggestive e-mails to his 15-year-old student. At the time of the ban, Eisler was coaching in California, where the Canadian ban did not apply. He did not appeal the ban. No criminal charges were ever filed.

== Post-competitive career ==
In 2004, Eisler was involved in starting the Skaters High Achievement Readiness Program at the West Kingston Skating Club in Kingston, Ontario; he resigned as director in January 2006.

Eisler is director of skating operations at the L.A. Kings Valley Ice Center in Panorama City, Los Angeles.

== Personal life ==
Eisler was born in Seaforth, Ontario, Canada. He has two sons, Ethan (born May 19, 2004) and Seth (born December 13, 2005) from his marriage to Marcia O'Brien Eisler.

He appeared in the 2006 FOX television program Skating with Celebrities, in which he was partnered with actress Kristy Swanson. He began a relationship with Swanson during the show. On February 16, 2007, Swanson gave birth to their son, Magnus Hart Swanson Eisler. Eisler and Swanson married on February 7, 2009, in San Luis Obispo, California.

He is a recipient of Canada's Meritorious Service Medal.

== Results ==
=== With Brasseur ===
International
| Event | 1987–88 | 1988–89 | 1989–90 | 1990–91 | 1991–92 | 1992–93 | 1993–94 |
|---|---|---|---|---|---|---|---|
| Olympics | 9th | | | | 3rd | | 3rd |
| Worlds | 7th | 7th | 2nd | 2nd | 3rd | 1st | 2nd |
| Nations Cup | | | | | 1st | | |
| NHK Trophy | | 4th | | 2nd | | 4th | 1st |
| Skate Canada | | 1st | | 1st | | | |
| Trophée de France | | | 2nd | | | | |
| Piruetten | | | | | | | 2nd |
National
| Canadians | 2nd | 1st | 3rd | 1st | 1st | 1st | 1st |

=== With Matousek ===
International
| Event | 1982–1983 | 1983–1984 | 1984–1985 |
|---|---|---|---|
| Olympics | | 8th | |
| Worlds | 10th | 5th | 3rd |
| NHK Trophy | | | 4th |
| Skate America | 6th | 5th | |
| Skate Canada | | | 3rd |
| Intern. St. Gervais | 2nd | | |
| Nebelhorn | 2nd | | |
National
| Canadians | 3rd | 1st | |

=== With Baier ===
International: Junior
| Event | 1977-78 | 1978-79 |
|---|---|---|
| World Junior Champs | 6th | 3rd |

=== Men's singles ===
National
| Event | 1982–1983 |
|---|---|
| Canadians | 2nd J |
