= Noriko Sato =

Japanese figure skater and coach

Japanese name
- Kanji: 佐藤紀子
- Kana: さとう のりこ
Transcriptions
- Romanization: Satō Noriko

Noriko Sato (佐藤 紀子, Satō Noriko; born on May 26, 1959, in Tokyo, Japan) is a Japanese figure skating coach and former competitor. She competed in ice dancing with Tadayuki Takahashi from 1979. They placed 17th in the 1984 Winter Olympic Games. They were the first ice dancers from Japan to compete in the Olympics, also the first ice dancers from Japan to win an international competition (1984 Prague Skate). She was six-time Japanese national champion from 1980 to 1985.

Currently she coaches in KOSÉ Shin-Yokohama Skate Center.

Her current students include:

- Kao Miura
- Rion Sumiyoshi

Notable past students include :

- Wakaba Higuchi

== Competitive highlights ==
Event	1979-80	1980-81	1981-82	1982-83	1983-84	1984-85
Winter Olympic Games					17	
World Championships	15	16	15	14	17	13
Japanese Championships	1	1	1	1	1	1
NHK Trophy		4	7		5	4

== See also ==
- Figure skating at the 1984 Winter Olympics
