= Elena Batanova =

Soviet figure skater

Personal information
- Full name: Elena Borisovna Batanova
- Born: 24 July 1964 (age 62) Moscow, Russian SFSR, Soviet Union

Figure skating career
- Country: Soviet Union

Elena Borisovna Batanova (Russian: Елена Борисовна Батанова) is a former competitive ice dancer for the Soviet Union. She is a two-time (1980, 1981) World Junior champion with partner Alexei Soloviev. On the senior level, they won the 1982 NHK Trophy and 1984 Soviet national title. They were coached by Lyudmila Pakhomova and later Tatiana Tarasova. Earlier, Batanova competed with Andrei Antonov, with whom she is the 1979 World Junior silver medalist.

Batanova is the daughter of football player Boris Batanov. She is married to hockey player Igor Larionov, with whom she has two daughters and a son.

== Results ==
=== With Soloviev ===
International
Event	1979–80	1980–81	1981–82	1982–83	1983–84	1984–85
Worlds				8th	7th	
NHK Trophy				1st		2nd
Moscow News			4th			
St. Ivel				3rd		
International: Junior
Junior Worlds	1st	1st				
National
Soviet Champ.				4th	1st	

=== With Antonov ===
Event	1979
World Junior Championships	2nd
