= Tadayuki Takahashi =

Japanese ice dancer and coach

Japanese name
- Kanji: 高橋忠之
- Kana: たかはし ただゆき
Transcriptions
- Romanization: Takahashi Tadayuki

Tadayuki Takahashi (高橋 忠之, Takahashi Tadayuki; born March 1, 1956 in Tokyo, Japan) is a Japanese figure skating coach and former ice dancer. He competed with Noriko Sato from 1979. They placed 17th in the 1984 Winter Olympic Games. They were the first ice dancers from Japan to compete in olympics, also the first ice dancers from Japan to win an international competition (1984 Prague Skate). He was seven-time Japanese national champions from 1979 to 1985.

Currently he coaches in KOSÉ Shin-Yokohama Skate Center.

== Competitive highlights ==
(with Yumiko Kage)

Event	1976–77	1977–78	1978–79
World Championships			19
Japanese Championships	2	2	1

(with Noriko Sato)

Event	1979–80	1980–81	1981–82	1982–83	1983–84	1984–85
Winter Olympic Games					17	
World Championships	15	16	15	14	17	13
Japanese Championships	1	1	1	1	1	1
NHK Trophy		4	7		5	4

== See also ==
- Figure skating at the 1984 Winter Olympics
