= Mark Rowsom =

Canadian pair skater

Personal information
- Born: 1959 (age 66–67)

Figure skating career
- Country: Canada
- Partner: Cynthia Coull
- Retired: c. 1987
Medal record
Representing Canada
Figure skating: Pairs
World Championships
Bronze medal – third place	1986 Geneva	Pairs

Mark Rowsom (born 1959 in Comber, Ontario) is a Canadian former pair skater. With his skating partner, Cynthia Coull, he became the 1986 World bronze medallist, 1986 Skate Canada International champion, and a three-time national champion (1985–1987).

== Results ==
(pairs with Coull)

International
Event	82–83	83–84	84–85	85–86	86–87
World Championships	9th	7th	7th	3rd	6th
NHK Trophy			3rd		
Skate America	4th				
Skate Canada International			2nd		1st
National
Canadian Championships	2nd	3rd	1st	1st	1st
