= Isabella Micheli =

Italian ice dancer

Personal information
- Nationality: Italian
- Born: 30 March 1962 (age 63); Como, Italy

Sport
- Sport: Figure skating

Isabella Micheli (born 30 March 1962) is an Italian former ice dancer. She competed in the ice dance event at the 1984 Winter Olympics.
