= 1978 World Junior Figure Skating Championships =

- Type: ISU Championship
- Date: 21 – 26 March 1978
- Season: 1977–78
- Location: Megève, France

Champions
- Men's singles: (Canada) Dennis Coi
- Ladies' singles: (United States) Jill Sawyer
- Pairs: (Canada) Barbara Underhill / Paul Martini
- Ice dance: (Soviet Union) Tatiana Durasova / Sergei Ponomarenko
- Previous: 1977 World Junior Championships
- Next: 1979 World Junior Championships

The 1978 World Junior Figure Skating Championships were held on 21–26 March 1978 in Megève, France. Sanctioned by the International Skating Union, it was the third edition of an annual competition in which figure skaters compete for the title of world junior champion. Medals were awarded in the disciplines of men's singles, ladies' singles, pair skating, and ice dancing.

== Results ==
=== Men ===
| Rank | Name | Nation | CF | SP | FS | SP+FS | Points | Places |
|---|---|---|---|---|---|---|---|---|
| 1 | Dennis Coi | Canada | | | 1 | | | |
| 2 | Vladimir Kotin | Soviet Union | 1 | | | | | |
| 3 | Brian Boitano | United States | | | | | | |
| 4 | Brian Orser | Canada | | | | | | |
| 5 | Joachim Edel | West Germany | | | | | | |
| 6 | Ivan Králík | Czechoslovakia | | | | | | |
| 7 | Michael Pasfield | Australia | | | | | | |
| 8 | Hervé Pornet | France | | | | | | |
| 9 | Dominique Fédronic | France | | | | | | |
| 10 | Kevin Marshall | United Kingdom | | | | | | |
| 11 | Volker Rauch | West Germany | | | | | | |
| 12 | Lars Åkesson | Sweden | | | | | | |
| 13 | Masaru Ogawa | Japan | | | | | | |
| 14 | Glenn Neate | Australia | | | | | | |
| 15 | Eric Krol | Belgium | | | | | | |
| 16 | Alexandru Anghel | Romania | | | | | | |
| 17 | Atsushi Nanbu | Japan | | | | | | |
| 18 | Mark Basto | Australia | | | | | | |

=== Ladies ===
| Rank | Name | Nation | CF | SP | FS | SP+FS | Points | Places |
|---|---|---|---|---|---|---|---|---|
| 1 | Jill Sawyer | United States | | | | | | |
| 2 | Kira Ivanova | Soviet Union | | | | | | |
| 3 | Petra Ernert | West Germany | | | | | | |
| 4 | Corinna Tanski | West Germany | | | | | | |
| 5 | Andrea Rohm | Austria | | | | | | |
| 6 | Tracey Wainman | Canada | 14 | 5 | 5 | | | |
| 7 | Lynne Rickatson | United Kingdom | | | | | | |
| 8 | Carolyn Dunkeld | United Kingdom | | | | | | |
| 9 | Rudina Pasveer | Netherlands | | | | | | |
| 10 | Renee Biagi | Italy | | | | | | |
| 11 | Simona Misovkova | Czechoslovakia | | | | | | |
| 12 | Alison Southwood | United Kingdom | | | | | | |
| 13 | Isabelle Deneux | France | | | | | | |
| 14 | Lorri Baier | Canada | | | | | | |
| 15 | Claire Michot | France | | | | | | |
| 16 | Herma van der Horst | Netherlands | | | | | | |
| 17 | Petra Schruf | Austria | | | | | | |
| 18 | Megumi Aotani | Japan | | | | | | |
| 19 | Vicki Holland | Australia | | | | | | |
| 20 | Catharina Lindgren | Sweden | | | | | | |
| 21 | Patricia Vangenechten | Belgium | | | | | | |
| 22 | Nataša Katić | Yugoslavia | | | | | | |
| 23 | Heidi Bartelsen | Denmark | | | | | | |
| 24 | Lim Hye-kyung | South Korea | | | | | | |
| 25 | Mariana Chitu | Romania | | | | | | |
| 26 | Linda Ann Skroder | Norway | | | | | | |
| WD | Patricia Claret | Switzerland | | | | | | |

=== Pairs ===
| Rank | Name | Nation | SP | FS | Points | Places |
|---|---|---|---|---|---|---|
| 1 | Barbara Underhill / Paul Martini | Canada | | | | |
| 2 | Jana Bláhová / Luděk Feňo | Czechoslovakia | | | | |
| 3 | Beth Flora / Ken Flora | United States | | | | |
| 4 | Marina Gurieva / Vladimir Radchenko | Soviet Union | | | | |
| 5 | Susan Garland / Robert Daw | United Kingdom | | | | |
| 6 | Lorri Baier / Lloyd Eisler | Canada | | | | |
| 7 | Kathia Dubec / Xavier Douillard | France | | | | |
| 8 | Gaby Galambos / Jorg Galambos | Switzerland | | | | |
| 9 | Eva Fabian / George Fabian | Australia | | | | |

=== Ice dance ===
| Rank | Name | Nation | CD | FD | Points | Places |
|---|---|---|---|---|---|---|
| 1 | Tatiana Durasova / Sergei Ponomarenko | Soviet Union | | | | |
| 2 | Kelly Johnson / Kris Barber | Canada | | | | |
| 3 | Nathalie Hervé / Pierre Husarek | France | | | | |
| 4 | Paola Casalotti / Sergio Ceserani | France | | | | |
| 5 | Elke Kwiet / Dieter Kwiet | West Germany | | | | |
| 6 | Catherine Coudert / Jean-Bernard Hamel | France | | | | |
| 7 | Deborah Byrne / Mark Boslay | United Kingdom | | | | |
| 8 | Marilena Medea / Igor Bartolini | France | | | | |
| 9 | Judit Péterfy / Csaba Bálint | Hungary | | | | |
