= 1982 World Figure Skating Championships =

Annual figure skating competition held in 1982

- Type: ISU Championship
- Date: March 9 – 14
- Season: 1981–82
- Location: Copenhagen, Denmark
- Venue: Brøndby Hall

Champions
- Men's singles: (United States) Scott Hamilton
- Ladies' singles: (United States) Elaine Zayak
- Pairs: (East Germany) Sabine Baeß / Tassilo Thierbach
- Ice dance: (United Kingdom) Jayne Torvill / Christopher Dean
- Previous: 1981 World Championships
- Next: 1983 World Championships

The 1982 World Figure Skating Championships were held in Copenhagen, Denmark from March 9 to 14. At the event, sanctioned by the International Skating Union, medals were awarded in men's singles, ladies' singles, pair skating, and ice dancing.

The ISU Representative was Olaf Poulsen and the ISU Technical Delegate was Josef Dědič. It was the first worlds with different judging panels for compulsory figures, short programs, and compulsory dance on one side and for the free skatings and free dance on the other.

== Medal tables ==
=== Medalists ===
Discipline	Gold	Silver	Bronze
Men	(United States) Scott Hamilton	(West Germany) Norbert Schramm	(Canada) Brian Pockar
Ladies	(United States) Elaine Zayak	(East Germany) Katarina Witt	(Austria) Claudia Kristofics-Binder
Pair skating	(East Germany) Sabine Baeß / Tassilo Thierbach	(Soviet Union) Marina Pestova / Stanislav Leonovich	(United States) Caitlin Carruthers / Peter Carruthers
Ice dancing	(United Kingdom) Jayne Torvill / Christopher Dean	(Soviet Union) Natalia Bestemianova / Andrei Bukin	(Soviet Union) Irina Moiseeva / Andrei Minenkov

=== Medals by country ===
Rank	Nation	Gold	Silver	Bronze	Total
1	United States (USA)	2	0	1	3
2	East Germany (GDR)	1	1	0	2
3	Great Britain (GBR)	1	0	0	1
4	Soviet Union (URS)	0	2	1	3
5	West Germany (FRG)	0	1	0	1
6	Austria (AUT)	0	0	1	1
6	Canada (CAN)	0	0	1	1
Totals (7 entries)		4	4	4	12

== Results ==
=== Men ===
Rank	Name	Nation	CP	SP	FS	SP+FS	Points	Total
1	Scott Hamilton	United States	2	1	1	1		2.6
2	Norbert Schramm	West Germany	6	2	2	2		6.4
3	Brian Pockar	Canada	5	7	4	5		9.8
4	Brian Orser	Canada	12	3	3	3		11.4
5	Jean-Christophe Simond	France	1	8	8	7		11.8
6	Robert Wagenhoffer	United States	9	4	5	4		12.0
7	Igor Bobrin	Soviet Union	4	9	6	6		12.0
8	David Santee	United States	3	16	7	9		15.2
9	Fumio Igarashi	Japan	8	14	9	10		19.4
10	Alexander Fadeev	Soviet Union	15	6	10	8		21.4
11	Vladimir Kotin	Soviet Union	11	12	12	13		23.4
12	Takashi Mura	Japan	14	11	11	11		23.8
13	Grzegorz Filipowski	Poland	10	13	13	14		24.2
14	Philippe Paulet	France	7	15	15	16		25.2
15	Rudi Cerne	West Germany	16	5	14	12		25.6
16	Jozef Sabovčík	Czechoslovakia	13	10	16	15		27.8
17	Didier Monge	France	19	17	17	17		35.2
18	Mitsuru Matsumura	Japan	18	18	18	18		36.0
19	Lars Åkesson	Sweden	17	20	21	21		39.2
20	Thomas Hlavik	Austria	21	19	20	19		40.2
21	Mark Pepperday	United Kingdom	27	25	19	20		45.2
22	Todd Sand	Denmark	22	21	25	24		46.6
23	Bruno Delmaestro	Italy	24	28	22	22		47.6
24	Richard Furrer	Switzerland	25	23	24	23		48.2
25	Miljan Begović	Yugoslavia	20	24	29	28		50.6
26	Michael Pasfield	Australia	26	22	27	26		51.4
27	Xu Zhaoxiao	China	30	29	23	25		52.6
28	Eric Krol	Belgium	23	27	28	29		52.6
29	Ed van Campen	Netherlands	28	26	26	27		53.2
30	Fernando Soria	Spain	29	30	30	30		59.4

Referee:

- Sonia Bianchetti Italy

Assistant Referee:

- Martin Flesenreich Austria

Judges for the compulsory figures and the short program:

- Markus Germann Switzerland
- Maria Zuchowicz Poland
- Elaine DeMore United States
- Walburga Grimm East Germany
- Monique Georgelin France
- Giordano Abbondati Italy
- Ludwig Gassner Austria

Substitute judge:

- Dennis McFarlane Canada

Judges for the free skating:

- Oskar Urban Czechoslovakia
- Tjaša Andrée Yugoslavia
- Sally-Anne Stapleford United Kingdom
- Britta Lindgren Sweden
- Kinuko Ueno Japan
- Norris Bowden Canada
- Leena Vainio Finland

Substitute judge:

- Günter Teichmann East Germany

=== Ladies ===
Elaine Zayak, the 1981 World silver medalist, rose from seventh place after the compulsory figures and short program to win the event, although she did not initially appear to be in the lead after her free skate scores were given, due to the system of ordinal placements used at the time. The broadcast of the event in the US on the Wide World of Sports had to put additional effort into editing in order to explain to viewers how the judging system worked and explain her rise in the standings.

Rank	Name	Nation	CP	SP	FS	SP+FS	Points	Total
1	Elaine Zayak	United States	4	10	1	3		7.4
2	Katarina Witt	East Germany	9	1	2	1		7.8
3	Claudia Kristofics-Binder	Austria	1	9	4	5		8.2
4	Claudia Leistner	West Germany	14	2	3	2		12.2
5	Elena Vodorezova	Soviet Union	5	3	8	7		12.2
6	Rosalynn Sumners	United States	11	4	5	4		13.2
7	Vikki de Vries	United States	8	7	6	6		13.6
8	Kay Thomson	Canada	6	6	9	9		15.0
9	Kristiina Wegelius	Finland	2	5	12	10		15.2
10	Deborah Cottrill	United Kingdom	3	8	17	13		22.0
11	Carola Paul	East Germany	13	12	10	11		22.6
12	Janina Wirth	East Germany	12	13	11	12		23.4
13	Elizabeth Manley	Canada	23	11	7	8		25.2
14	Sanda Dubravčić	Yugoslavia	10	14	19	18		30.6
15	Manuela Ruben	West Germany	18	19	13	14		31.4
16	Sandra Cariboni	Switzerland	15	20	16	17		33.0
17	Karen Wood	United Kingdom	22	18	14	15		34.4
18	Sonja Stanek	Austria	7	15	25	21		35.2
19	Catarina Lindgren	Sweden	25	17	15	16		36.8
20	Myriam Oberwiler	Switzerland	20	21	18	19		38.4
21	Béatrice Farinacci	France	16	26	20	20		40.0
22	Mariko Joshida	Japan	21	23	22	22		43.8
23	Diana Rankin	United Kingdom	19	16	28	26		45.8
24	Parthena Sarafidis	Austria	24	27	21	23		46.2
25	Hanne Gamborg	Denmark	26	24	23	24		48.2
26	Karin Telser	Italy	17	25	29	28		49.2
27	Vicki Holland	Australia	30	22	24	25		50.8
28	Liisa Seitsonen	Finland	29	28	26	27		54.6
29	Li Scha Wang	Netherlands	28	31	27	29		56.2
30	Katrien Pauwels	Belgium	27	29	32	31		59.8
31	Rosario Esteban	Spain	32	30	30	30		61.2
32	Zhenghua Bao	China	34	32	31	32		64.2
33	Lim Hye-kyung	South Korea	33	33	33	33		66.0
WD	Denyse Adam	New Zealand	31					

Referee:

- Elemér Terták Hungary

Assistant Referee:

- Berit Aarnes Norway

Judges for the compulsory figures and the short program:

- Leena Vainio Finland
- Margaret Berezowski Canada
- Elsbeth Bon Netherlands
- Toshio Suzuki Japan
- Jacqueline Kendall-Baker Australia
- Eugen Romminger West Germany
- Tatiana Danilenko Soviet Union

Substitute judge:

- Sally-Anne Stapleford United Kingdom

Judges for the free skating:

- Markus Germann Switzerland
- Maria Zuchowicz Poland
- Elaine DeMore United States
- Walburga Grimm East Germany
- Monique Georgelin France
- Giordano Abbondati Italy
- Ludwig Gassner Austria

Substitute judge:

- Dennis McFarlane Canada

=== Pairs ===
Rank	Name	Nation	SP	FS	Points	Total
1	Sabine Baeß / Tassilo Thierbach	East Germany	1	1		1.4
2	Marina Pestova / Stanislav Leonovich	Soviet Union	2	2		2.8
3	Kitty Carruthers / Peter Carruthers	United States	4	3		4.6
4	Barbara Underhill / Paul Martini	Canada	5	4		6.0
5	Irina Vorobieva / Igor Lisovski	Soviet Union	3	5		6.2
6	Veronika Pershina / Marat Akbarov	Soviet Union	6	6		8.4
7	Birgit Lorenz / Knut Schubert	East Germany	7	7		9.8
8	Lea Ann Miller / William Fauver	United States	9	8		11.6
9	Lori Baier / Lloyd Eisler	Canada	8	9		12.2
10	Maria DiDomenico / Burt Lancon	United States	10	10		14.0
11	Bettina Hage / Stefan Zins	West Germany	12	11		15.8
12	Nathalie Tortel / Xavier Videau	France	11	12		16.4
13	Luan Bo / Yao Bin	China	13	13		18.2

Referee:

- Benjamin T. Wright United States

Assistant Referee:

- Jürg Wilhelm Switzerland

Judges for the short program:

- Virginia LeFevre United States
- Sergei Kononykhin Soviet Union
- Norris Bowden Canada
- Markus Germann Switzerland
- Pamela Davis United Kingdom
- Kinuko Ueno Japan
- Giordano Abbondati Italy

Substitute judge:

- Britta Lindgren Sweden

Judges for the free skating:

- Elfriede Beyer West Germany
- Günter Teichmann East Germany
- Thérèse Maisel France
- Tjaša Andrée Yugoslavia
- Jacqueline Kendall-Baker Australia
- Elsbeth Bon Netherlands
- Gerhardt Bubnik Czechoslovakia

Substitute judge:

- Britta Lindgren Sweden

=== Ice dancing ===
Rank	Name	Nation	CD	FD	Total
1	Jayne Torvill / Christopher Dean	United Kingdom	1	1	2
2	Natalia Bestemianova / Andrei Bukin	Soviet Union	2	2	4
3	Irina Moiseeva / Andrei Minenkov	Soviet Union	4	3	7
4	Judy Blumberg / Michael Seibert	United States	3	4	7
5	Carol Fox / Richard Dalley	United States	5	5	10
6	Olga Volozhinskaya / Alexander Svinin	Soviet Union	6	6	12
7	Karen Barber / Nicholas Slater	United Kingdom	7	8	15
8	Elisa Spitz / Scott Gregory	United States	9	7	16
9	Jana Beránková / Jan Barták	Czechoslovakia	8	9	17
10	Tracy Wilson / Robert McCall	Canada	10	10	20
11	Nathalie Hervé / Pierre Béchu	France	11	11	22
12	Birgit Goller / Peter Klisch	West Germany	13	12	25
13	Wendy Sessions / Stephen Williams	United Kingdom	12	13	25
14	Petra Born / Rainer Schönborn	West Germany	14	14	28
15	Noriko Sato / Tadayuki Takahashi	Japan	16	15	31
16	Marianne van Bommel / Wayne Deweyert	Netherlands	15	16	31
17	Martine Olivier / Philippe Boissier	France	18	17	35
18	Graziella Ferpozzi / Marco Ferpozzi	Switzerland	19	18	37
19	Saila Saarinen / Kim Jacobson	Finland	20	19	39
20	Ulla Örnmarker / Thomas Svedberg	Sweden	21	20	41
WD	Isabella Micheli / Roberto Pelizzola	Italy	17		

Referee:

- Lawrence Demmy United Kingdom

Assistant Referee:

- Hans Kutschera Austria

Judges for the compulsory dance:

- Joyce Hisey Canada
- István Sugár Hungary
- Gerhardt Bubnik Czechoslovakia
- Lysiane Lauret France
- Brenda Long United Kingdom
- Ludwig Gassner Austria
- Lily Klapp Switzerland

Substitute judge:

- Tsukasa Kimura Japan

Judges for the free dance:

- Gerhard Frey West Germany
- Igor Kabanov Soviet Union
- Lily Klapp Switzerland
- Mary Louise Wright United States
- Cia Bordogna Italy
- Tsukasa Kimura Japan
- Maria Zuchowicz Poland

Substitute judge:

- Ludwig Gassner Austria

== Sources ==
- Result list provided by the ISU
