= 1980 World Junior Figure Skating Championships =

- Type: ISU Championship
- Date: January 15 – 20, 1980
- Season: 1979–80
- Location: Megève, France

Champions
- Men's singles: (Soviet Union) Alexandre Fadeev
- Ladies' singles: (United States) Rosalynn Sumners
- Pairs: (Soviet Union) Larisa Selezneva / Oleg Makarov
- Ice dance: (Soviet Union) Elena Batanova / Alexei Soloviev
- Previous: 1979 World Junior Championships
- Next: 1981 World Junior Championships

The 1980 World Junior Figure Skating Championships were held on January 15–20, 1980 in Megève, France. Sanctioned by the International Skating Union, it was the fifth edition of an annual competition in which figure skaters compete for the title of world junior champion. Medals were awarded in the disciplines of men's singles, ladies' singles, pair skating, and ice dancing.

== Results ==
=== Men ===
Rank	Name	Nation	CF	SP	FS	SP+FS	Points	Places
1	Alexandre Fadeev	Soviet Union						
2	Vitali Egorov	Soviet Union						
3	Falko Kirsten	East Germany						
4	Grzegorz Filipowski	Poland						
5	Scott Williams	United States						
6	Neil Paterson	Canada						
7	Laurent Depouilly	France						
8	Alexei Sidorov	Soviet Union						
9	Oliver Höner	Switzerland						
10	Jack O'Brien	United States						
11	Ralf Lewandowski	East Germany						
12	Didier Manaud	France						
13	Masaru Ogawa	Japan						
14	Thomas Wieser	West Germany						
15	Andrzej Strzelec	Poland						
16	Cameron Medhurst	Australia						
17	Roger Andersson	Sweden						
18	Thomas Hlavik	Austria						
19	Karel Landys	Sweden						
20	Fini Ravn	Denmark						
21	Fernando Soria	Spain						
22	Tomislav Čižmešija	Yugoslavia						

=== Ladies ===
Rank	Name	Nation	CF	SP	FS	SP+FS	Points	Places
1	Rosalynn Sumners	United States						
2	Kay Thomson	Canada						
3	Carola Paul	East Germany						
4	Manuela Ruben	West Germany						
5	Daniela Massanneck	West Germany						
6	Marina Serova	Soviet Union						
7	Béatrice Farinacci	France						
8	Daniela Zuccoli	Italy						
9	Bunny Blake	United States						
10	Andrea Rohm	Austria						
11	Chantal Zurcher	Switzerland						
12	Masako Kato	Japan						
13	Lotta Isaksson	Finland						
14	Beata Nachrzter	Poland						
15	Patricia Vangenechten	Belgium						
16	Li Scha Wang	Netherlands						
17	Caroline Naredi	Sweden						
18	Amanda James	Australia						
19	Tine-Mai Krian	Norway						
20	Nataša Katić	Yugoslavia						
21	Anette Nygaard	Denmark						
22	Cristina Haas	Spain						
23	Svetla Staneva	Bulgaria						
24	Shin Hi-jung	South Korea						
WD	Kathy Lindsay	New Zealand						

=== Pairs ===
Rank	Name	Nation	SP	FS	Points	Places
1	Larisa Selezneva / Oleg Makarov	Soviet Union				
2	Marina Nikitiuk / Rashid Kadyrkaev	Soviet Union				
3	Kathia Dubec / Xavier Douillard	France				
4	Kelly Abolt / Kevin Peeks	United States				
5	Elena Kravchenko / Vladimir Starostin	Soviet Union				
6	Gaby Galambos / Jörg Galambos	Switzerland				

=== Ice dance ===
Rank	Name	Nation	CD	FD	Points	Places
1	Elena Batanova / Andrei Antonov	Soviet Union				
2	Judit Péterfy / Csaba Bálint	Hungary				
3	Renée Roca / Andrew Ouellette	United States				
4	Oksana Gusakova / Genrikh Sretenski	Soviet Union				
5	Karen Taylor / Robert Burk	Canada				
6	Petra Born / Rainer Schönborn	West Germany				
7	Sophie Schmidt / Eric Desplats	France				
8	Maria Kniffer / Manfred Hübler	Austria				
9	Iwona Bielas / Jacek Jasiaczek	Poland				
10	Karan Giles / Russell Green	United Kingdom				
11	Gabriella Ferpozzi / Marco Ferpozzi	Switzerland				
12	Raffaella Cazzaniga / Massimo Crippa	Italy				
13	Brennice Coates / Leslie Boroczky	Australia				
14	Nicoletta Lunghi / Oscar Cassa	Italy				
15	Edith Rodinger / Harald Rodinger	Austria				
16	Sophie Merigot / Philippe Berthe	France				
17	Natascha Devisch / Jan Tack	Belgium				
