= Pioneer Fund (disambiguation) =

Pioneer Fund is a eugenics fund established in 1937.

Pioneer Fund may also refer to:

- The Pioneer Fund, a figure-skating, education, and medicine fund founded by Helen M. McLoraine
- Pioneer, an international talent fund run by Daniel Gross (businessman)
