= Great Eight =

Great Eight may refer to:

- The Great Eight (Cincinnati Reds), the starting lineup for the 1975 Cincinnati Reds
- Eight Great Lingpas, important figures in the Nyingma lineage of Tibetan Buddhism
- The Great Eight (book), a 2009 book by Olympian figure skater Scott Hamilton
- "Great 8", a nickname for Russian ice hockey player Alexander Ovechkin whose player number is 8
- A nickname for the Théâtre National de Bretagne, in Rennes, France

== See also ==
- Great (disambiguation)
