= 1979 World Junior Figure Skating Championships =

- Type: ISU Championship
- Date: 27 March – 4 April 1979
- Season: 1978–79
- Location: Augsburg, West Germany

Champions
- Men's singles: (Soviet Union) Vitali Egorov
- Ladies' singles: (United States) Elaine Zayak
- Pairs: (Soviet Union) Veronika Pershina / Marat Akbarov
- Ice dance: (Soviet Union) Tatiana Durasova / Sergei Ponomarenko
- Previous: 1978 World Junior Championships
- Next: 1980 World Junior Championships

The 1979 World Junior Figure Skating Championships were held from 27 March to 4 April 1979 in Augsburg, West Germany. Sanctioned by the International Skating Union, it was the fourth edition of an annual competition in which figure skaters compete for the title of world junior champion. Medals were awarded in the disciplines of men's singles, ladies' singles, pair skating, and ice dancing.

== Results ==
=== Men ===
Rank	Name	Nation	CF	SP	FS	SP+FS	Points	Places
1	Vitali Egorov	Soviet Union						
2	Bobby Beauchamp	United States						
3	Alexandre Fadeev	Soviet Union						
4	Falko Kirsten	East Germany						
5	Ivan Králík	Czechoslovakia						
6	Grzegorz Filipowski	Poland						
7	James Santee	United States						
8	Fernand Fédronic	France						
9	Lars Åkesson	Sweden						
10	Oliver Höner	Switzerland						
11	Raimund Volker	West Germany						
12	Pierre-Michel Seveno	France						
13	Brad Maclean	Canada						
14	Darin Mathewson	Canada						
15	Thomas Hlavik	Austria						
16	Josef Šenk	Czechoslovakia						
17	Thomas Wieser	West Germany						
18	Eric Krol	Belgium						
19	Thierry Michels	Luxembourg						
20	Mark Basto	Australia						
21	Fernando Soria	Spain						
22	Fini Ravn	Denmark						
23	Cameron Medhurst	Australia						
24	Damir Velnić	Yugoslavia						

=== Ladies ===
Rank	Name	Nation	CF	SP	FS	SP+FS	Points	Places
1	Elaine Zayak	United States						
2	Manuela Ruben	West Germany						
3	Jacki Farrell	United States						
4	Daniela Massanneck	West Germany						
5	Petra Schruf	Austria						
6	Kay Thomson	Canada						
7	Andrea Rohm	Austria						
8	Svetlana Frantsuzova	Soviet Union						
9	Tatiana Mikhailova	Soviet Union						
10	Simona Misovkova	Czechoslovakia						
11	Vicki Holland	Australia						
12	Yukiko Okabe	Japan						
13	Alison Southwood	United Kingdom						
14	Béatrice Farinacci	France						
15	Karin Telser	Italy						
16	Lisbeth Berckmans	Belgium						
17	Hanne Gamborg	Denmark						
18	Herma van der Horst	Netherlands						
19	Sandra Cariboni	Switzerland						
20	Catharina Lindgren	Sweden						
21	Nevenka Lisak	Yugoslavia						
22	Cristina Haas	Spain						
23	Kathy Lindsay	New Zealand						

=== Pairs ===
Rank	Name	Nation	SP	FS	Points	Places
1	Veronika Pershina / Marat Akbarov	Soviet Union				
2	Larisa Selezneva / Oleg Makarov	Soviet Union				
3	Lorri Baier / Lloyd Eisler	Canada				
4	Beth Flora / Ken Flora	United States				
5	Danelle Porter / Burt Lancon	United States				
6	Marina Gurieva / Vladimir Radchenko	Soviet Union				
7	Kathia Dubec / Xavier Douillard	France				
8	Rosemary Sweeney / Daniel Salera	United States				
9	Susan Garland / Robert Daw	United Kingdom				
10	Ingrid Ženatá / René Novotný	Czechoslovakia				
11	Svetlana Paliderová / Peter Bendicac	Czechoslovakia				
12	Gaby Galambos / Jorg Galambos	Switzerland				

=== Ice dance ===
Rank	Name	Nation	CD	FD	Points	Places
1	Tatiana Durasova / Sergei Ponomarenko	Soviet Union				
2	Elena Batanova / Andrei Antonov	Soviet Union				
3	Kelly Johnson / Kris Barber	Canada				
4	Judit Péterfy / Csaba Bálint	Hungary				
5	Elisa Spitz / Stanley Makman	United States				
6	Elke Kwiet / Dieter Kwiet	West Germany				
7	Oksana Gusakova / Genrikh Sretenski	Soviet Union				
8	Paola Casalotti / Sergio Ceserani	Italy				
9	Maria Kniffer / Manfred Hübler	Austria				
10	Catherine Coudert / Jean-Bernard Hamel	France				
11	Iwona Bielas / Jacek Jasiaczek	Poland				
12	Birgit Rothe / Rolf Rothe	West Germany				
13	Petra Born / Rainer Schönborn	West Germany				
14	Alison Wilson / Victor Farrow	United Kingdom				
15	Sophie Schmidt / Eric Desplats	France				
16	Isabella Micheli / Roberto Modoni	Italy				
17	Monica Bernasconi / Raffaele Modoni	Italy				
18	Karan Giles / Russell Green	United Kingdom				
19	Esther Guiglia / Roland Mader	Switzerland				
20	Brennice Coates / Leslie Boroczky	Australia				
21	Natascha Devisch / Jan Tack	Belgium				
