= Ilona Berecz =

Hungarian ice dancing coach and former competitor

Personal information
- Born: 16 December 1947 (age 78) Budapest, Hungary

Figure skating career
- Country: Hungary
- Partner: István Sugár
- Skating club: Ferencvárosi TC (1959–1971)
- Retired: c. 1971

Ilona Berecz (born 16 December 1947) is a Hungarian ice dancing coach and former competitor. With István Sugár, she is a two-time Hungarian national champion and the 1968 Blue Swords bronze medalist. They finished in the top ten at three European Championships.

== Personal life ==
Berecz was born 16 December 1947 in Budapest, Hungary. She married Hungarian ice hockey player Mátyás Vedres.

== Career ==
Berecz switched from singles to ice dancing when she was sixteen years old. She competed in partnership with István Sugár. The duo finished in the top ten at the 1969 European Championships in Garmisch-Partenkirchen, West Germany; 1970 European Championships in Leningrad, Soviet Union; and 1971 European Championships in Zürich, Switzerland. They competed at three World Championships; their best result, 12th, came in 1970 (Ljubljana, Yugoslavia). They won two Hungarian national titles.

During her competitive career, Berecz was a member of Ferencvárosi TC. She later coached ice dancing at Budapest Spartacus for three decades, beginning in 1974. Her former students include:

- Klára Engi / Attila Tóth
- Zita Gebora / András Visontai
- Judit Péterfy / Csaba Bálint
- Gabriella Remport / Sándor Nagy
- Dóra Turóczi / Balázs Major

From 1980 to 1995, Berecz served as the head of the ice dancing division at the Hungarian National Skating Federation.

== Competitive highlights ==
With Sugár

International
Event	64–65	65–66	66–67	67–68	68–69	69–70	70–71
World Champ.					13th	12th	15th
European Champ.		16th	15th	12th	8th	8th	10th
Blue Swords					3rd		
Prague Skate	11th						
National
Hungarian Champ.	3rd	2nd	2nd	2nd	2nd	1st	1st
