= Tirnavia Ice Cup =

Annual figure skating competition

- Genre: International competition
- Frequency: Annual
- Venue: Mestský zimný štadion
- Location: Trnava
- Country: Slovakia
- Sponsors: Trnava Figure Skating Club & Slovak Figure Skating Association

The Tirnavia Ice Cup is an international figure skating competition held in Trnava, Slovakia. Medals may be awarded in men's singles, women's singles, and pair skating at the senior, junior, and novice levels. The event formerly included ice dance.

== Senior results ==
=== Men's singles ===
Men's event medalists
Year	Gold	Silver	Bronze	Ref.
2019	(Switzerland) Nurullah Sahaka	(Switzerland) David Gouvela	(Slovakia) Marco Klepoch	
2021	(Slovakia) Adam Hagara	(Bulgaria) Beat Shuemperli	(Switzerland) Micha Steffen	
2022	(Slovakia) Adam Hagara	(Bulgaria) Alexander Zlatkov	(Bulgaria) Beat Shuemperli	
2023	(Italy) Gabriele Frangipani	(Slovakia) Adam Hagara	(Croatia) Jari Kessler	
2024	(Germany) Tim England	(Poland) Jakub Lofek	(Lithuania) Daniel Korabelnik	
2025	(France) Ian Vauclin	(Ukraine) Vadym Novikov	(Slovakia) Jozef Curma	

=== Women's singles ===
Women's event medalists
Year	Gold	Silver	Bronze	Ref.
2019	(Austria) Stefanie Pesendorfer	(Finland) Vera Stolt	(Switzerland) Shaline Ruegger	
2021	(United Kingdom) Kristen Spours	(Slovakia) Alexandra Michaela Filcová	(Austria) Stefanie Pesendorfer	
2022	(Austria) Stefanie Pesendorfer	(Switzerland) Shaline Ruegger	(Czech Republic) Barbora Vránková	
2023	(Romania) Julia Sauter	(Slovakia) Vanesa Šelmeková	(Ukraine) Yelyzaveta Babenko	
2024	(Slovakia) Vanesa Šelmeková	(Czech Republic) Eliška Březinová	(Netherlands) Niki Wories	
2025	(France) Lorine Schild	(France) Eve Dubecq	(United Kingdom) Nina Povey	

== Junior results ==
=== Men's singles ===
Junior men's event medalists
Year	Gold	Silver	Bronze	Ref.
2009	(Slovakia) Jakub Štróbl	(Ukraine) Yakov Godorozha	(Czech Republic) Petr Coufal	
2010	(Belarus) Vitali Luchanok	(Ukraine) Yakov Godorozha	(Ukraine) Igor Reznichenko	
2011	(Germany) Alexander Schöpke	(Finland) Juho Pirinen	(United Kingdom) Vincent Hey	
2012	(Czech Republic) Tomáš Kupka	(Czech Republic) Jan Kurník	(Slovakia) Marco Klepoch	
2013	(Slovakia) Marco Klepoch	(Italy) Marco Zandron	(Slovakia) Jakub Kršňák	
2014	(Czech Republic) Jiří Bělohradský	(Czech Republic) Matyáš Bělohradský	(Slovakia) Jakub Kršňák	
2015	(Hungary) Máté Böröcz	(Slovakia) Jakub Kršňák	(Czech Republic) Filip Ščerba	
2016	(Poland) Ryszard Gurtler	(France) Julian Donica	(Slovakia) Jakub Kršňák	
2017	(Czech Republic) Filip Scerba	(Czech Republic) Daniel Mrazek	(Slovakia) Jakub Kršňák	
2019	(Slovakia) Marko Piliar	(Hungary) Dominik HortoBagyi	(United Kingdom) Jacob Casey	
2021	(Slovakia) Lukas Vaclavik	(Switzerland) Nico Steffen	(Switzerland) Georgii Pavlov	
2022	(Ukraine) Vadym Novikov	(Slovakia) Marko Piliar	(Lithuania) Daniel Korabelnik	
2023	(Poland) Matvii Yefymenko	(Finland) Matias Heinonen	(Slovenia) Dmitry Rudenko	
2024	(Slovenia) David Sedej	(Ukraine) Vadym Novikov	(Czech Republic) Tadeas Vaclavik	
2025	(Israel) Nikita Sheiko	(Israel) Kirill Sheiko	(Slovakia) Dmitry Rudenko	

=== Women's singles ===
Junior women's event medalists
Year	Gold	Silver	Bronze	Ref.
2009	(Slovakia) Karolína Sýkorová	(Slovakia) Monika Simančíková	(Slovenia) Patricia Gleščič	
2010	(Slovakia) Karolína Sýkorová	(Ukraine) Alina Biletska	(Finland) Krista Pitkäniemi	
2011	(Germany) Anne Zetzsche	(Slovakia) Erika Víteková	(Czech Republic) Laura Raszyková	
2012	(Germany) Lutricia Bock	(Ukraine) Anna Khnychenkova	(Germany) Natalia Fartushina	
2013	(Germany) Lea Johanna Dastich	(Czech Republic) Klára Světlíková	(Hungary) Dorka Havasi	
2014	(Hungary) Ivett Tóth	(Hungary) Fruzsina Medgyesi	(Turkey) Elif Erdem	
2015	(Czech Republic) Michaela Lucie Hanzlíková	(United Kingdom) Anna Litvinenko	(Slovakia) Nina Letenayová	
2016	(France) Elodie Eudine	(Czech Republic) Michaela Lucie Hanzlíková	(Finland) Laura Karhunen	
2017	(United Kingdom) Anna Litvinenko	(Finland) Linnea Ceder	(Belarus) Lizaveta Malinouskaya	
2018	(United Kingdom) Anna Litvinenko	(United Kingdom) Genevieve Somerville	(Slovakia) Agata Bacova	
2019	(Hungary) Regina Schermann	(Austria) Dorotea Partonjic	(Austria) Sophie-Lauren Guenther	
2021	(Finland) Rosa Reponen	(Switzerland) Sarina Joos	(Slovakia) Vanesa Šelmeková	
2022	(Finland) Minja Peltonen	(Austria) Hannah Frank	(Italy) Siqi Liu	
2023	(Hungary) Polina Dzsumanyijazova	(Austria) Hannah Frank	(Italy) Matilde Petracchi	
2024	(Germany) Anna Gerke	(Czech Republic) Jana Horcickova	(Hungary) Polina Dzsumanyijazova	
2025	(Hungary) Polina Dzsumanyijazova	(Germany) Anna Gerke	(Israel) Simona Tkachman	

=== Pairs ===
Junior pairs event medalists
Year	Gold	Silver	Bronze	Ref.
2021	(Czech Republic) Barbora Kocianova / Lukas Vochozka	(Slovakia) Margareta Muskova / Oliver Kubacak	No other competitors	
2024	(United Kingdom) Zarah Wood / Alex Labsky	(Czech Republic) Alzbeta Kviderova / Jindrich Klement	(Poland) Wiktoria Pacha / Szymon Derechowski	

=== Ice dance ===
Junior ice dance event medalists
Year	Gold	Silver	Bronze	Ref.
2009	(Hungary) Dóra Turóczi / Balázs Major	(Ukraine) Maria Nosulia / Yevhen Kholoniuk	(Czech Republic) Karolína Procházková / Michal Češka	
2010	(Ukraine) Lolita Yermak / Alexander Liubchenko	(Ukraine) Anastasia Karnaushchenko / Alexei Khimich	(Germany) Shari Koch / Christian Nüchtern	
