= Rosalynn Sumners =

American figure skater

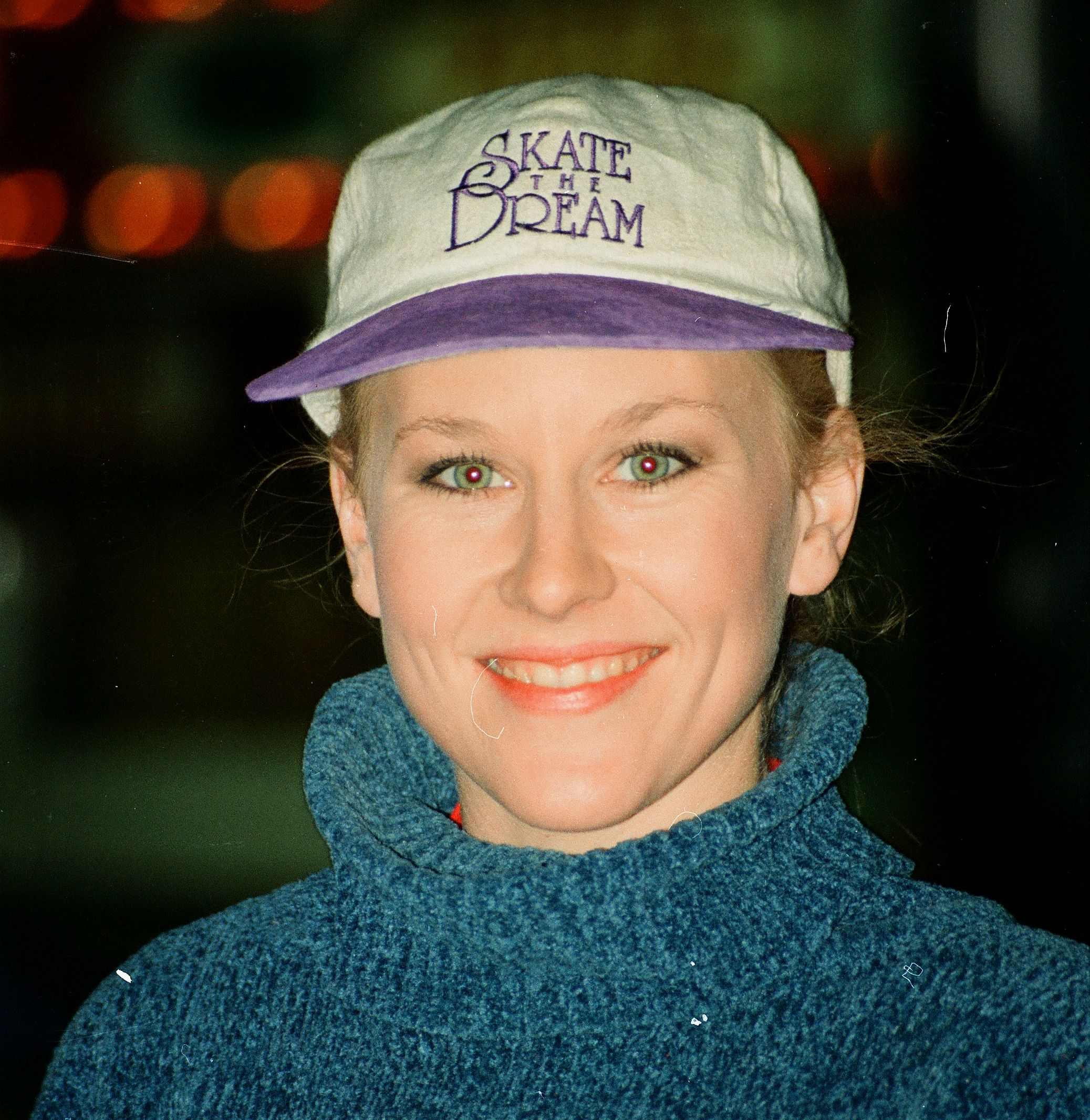
- Sumners in 1996

Personal information
- Born: April 20, 1964 (age 62) Palo Alto, California, U.S.
- Height: 5 ft 1 in (155 cm)

Figure skating career
- Country: United States
- Skating club: Seattle Skating Club
- Retired: 1984
Medal record
Ladies' figure skating
Representing United States
Olympic Games
Silver medal – second place	1984 Sarajevo	Ladies' singles
World Championships
Gold medal – first place	1983 Helsinki	Ladies' singles
World Junior Championships
Gold medal – first place	1980 Megève	Ladies' singles

Rosalynn Diane Sumners (born April 20, 1964) is an American former competitive figure skater. She was the World Junior champion in 1980, the U.S. National champion in 1982, 1983 and 1984, World champion in 1983, and won a silver medal at the 1984 Winter Olympics (second to Katarina Witt).

== Early career ==
Sumners was born in Palo Alto, California and raised in Edmonds, Washington. Sumners considers Edmonds her hometown and is where she learned to skate. Edmonds renamed its 5th Avenue to "Rosalynn Sumners Boulevard" after her winning the silver medal in the 1984 Olympics.

Sumners was a hard-working, dedicated skater. Her coach, Lorraine Borman, called the "Wizard of Roz", emphasized her student's artistry as her skating strength. Sumners balanced athleticism and artistry, giving her a competitive edge. Sumners first emerged on the skating scene after winning the 1980 World Junior title. Her artistic style throughout 1980–1981 usually placed her 1st or 2nd in the free skating round of competitions while scoring lower in the compulsory figures at this stage of her career. She failed to make the U.S. World team or win any medals.

In the 1981–1982 season, though still weak in figures, Sumners was successful. She won a silver medal in a stacked field at Skate Canada (winning the free skate and combined free skate, but being 8th in figures), and later won an upset U.S. title over defending Champion Elaine Zayak, rising star Vikki de Vries, and veteran Priscilla Hill, climbing from 5th place after the figures by winning the short and long programs. At the World Figure Skating Championships, Rosalynn scaled down her technical content due to injury, attempting only one triple over the two free skating phases, but delivered strong short and long programs, placing 4th (behind Witt, Leistner, Vodezorova) in the short, 5th in the long (behind Zayak, Witt, Leistner, Kristofics Binder), and 4th in combined free skating (behind Witt, Leistner, Zayak), taking 6th place overall at her first Worlds, despite a low 11th in the compulsory figures.

== 1982–1984 ==
In 1982–1983, Sumners showed improvement in compulsory figures. She won Skate America, defeating strong competitors including Claudia Leistner and Kristiina Wegelius. She took the bronze at Skate Canada, that was won by Vikki De Vries, after several falls in the long program. She won silver behind Katarina Witt at NHK, after a pair of lackluster performances. By U.S. Nationals though, Rosalynn was at her best, her jumps showing improved fitness and power, easily defending her title over reigning World Champion and 1981 U.S. Champion Elaine Zayak, winning all three phases (compulsory figure, short program, long program). Especially impressive was her short program, delivering a clean performance including a triple jump combination for the only time of her career in the short, earning mostly 5.9s on both technical and artistic marks. At the World Championships that year she came in as one of the favorites, winning her first and only World title. She won the figures and 4th in the short due a missed triple jump combination she had previously executed well at Nationals, then winning the long program. Her main rivals were Elaine Zayak, who withdrew with injury after 11th place in figures, and Katarina Witt who finished 4th overall after placing 8th place in figures, despite a 1st place in the short, and 2nd to Rosalynn (on a 5–4 split) in the final long program.

Sumners struggled throughout 1983–1984 and seemed less technically proficient compared to her stellar 1982–1983 season. She lost (while ill) to little-known Yugoslav skater Sanda Dubravčić in one international event. She won her third straight U.S. title, but only after technical problems in both the short and long programs left her in 2nd place in both phases to rising star Tiffany Chin. She went into the Olympics as a narrow favorite for the gold medal in an open field with Katarina Witt, Elaine Zayak, reigning World silver medalist Claudia Leistner, Tiffany Chin, and reigning World bronze medalist Elena Vodorezova, who were considered strong contenders. The event was so competitive that the perceived third Soviet skater behind Anna Kondrashova and Vodorezova- Kira Ivanova, who had not competed at a World Championships since 1981 due to a travel ban, and was only 4th at the recent European Championships (without Leistner or Vodorozova), took the bronze medal. Rosalynn won the compulsory figures, but main rival Katarina Witt, known to struggle in figures, was a close 3rd. Looking to win the short program to put Witt out of reach, and after a clean jump combination, a foot touching down on the double axel left Sumners in 5th at that phase, and dropped her to a close 2nd overall going into the long program behind Katarina Witt. Had she won the short program, she would have only required a 2nd place in the long program to win. Now the winner would be whether Sumners or Witt won the final long program between her and Witt. Witt delivered a strong, clean, and charismatic performance, with three triples and three double axels, including a difficult and then rare double lutz-triple toe. Witt's skating was hesitant at times, and she omitted her famed triple flip. With 5 5.9s, 12 5.8s and 1 5.7 out of 18 marks she had positioned herself in good shape, but the judges still left room for Sumners to win with a great performance. Rosalynn followed with a reasonably strong skate, but a doubled triple toe and singled double axel in the closing seconds (which left her only two triples and two double axels as opposed to Witt's 3 of each, and also no triple jump combination in the whole performance) likely cost her the gold medal which she would lose by only one tenth of a point on a 5–4 split of the judges. Had any of the Soviet, West German, or Canadian judges rose her technical mark by .1 she would have been the winner of the long program and the gold medal. She received a perfect 6.0 for artistic impression from the Italian judge, the first 6.0 awarded in the ladies event at the Olympics since 1972.

== Later life and career ==
Sumners opted out of competing for a second World title at the upcoming Worlds in Ottawa, and instead turned professional immediately after the 1984 Winter Olympics. She toured first with Disney on Ice, and then was one of the original cast members of the Stars on Ice tour, appearing until 1999. She became one of the most consistent and long-standing competitors on the professional circuit, appearing at the World Professional Championships in Landover ten consecutive years (from 1984 to 1993) although never winning the event. Her biggest win was the Challenge of Champions in 1986, and won numerous other professional competitions. She did not do triple jumps in professional competitions, but was known for her artistry.

In 1984, Sumners lent three of her world figure skating medals to an Edmonds bank for display. When she was to retrieve them, the bank had changed ownership, and no one knew where the medals had been stored. They were discovered twenty years later as unclaimed property in a safe deposit box and returned to Sumners (with a mock "awards" ceremony) by the state of Washington in 2004.

On April 24, 2004, Sumners married IMG vice president Bob Kain. She opened several retail shops in Kirkland in 2011.

== Results ==
International
Event	1979–80	1980–81	1981–82	1982–83	1983–84
Winter Olympics					2nd
World Championships			6th	1st	
NHK Trophy				2nd	
Skate America		4th		1st	
Skate Canada	5th	2nd	3rd		
Golden Spin					2nd
International: Junior
World Junior Champ.	1st				
National
U.S. Championships		4th	1st	1st	1st

== Records and achievements ==
- World champion (1983)
- Three-time United States National champion (1982–1984)
- Olympic silver medalist (1984)
- Inducted into the United States Figure Skating Hall of Fame (2001)
