= Brian Pockar =

Canadian figure skater (1959–1992)

Personal information
- Full name: Brian James Pockar
- Born: October 27, 1959 Calgary, Alberta, Canada
- Died: April 28, 1992 (aged 32) Calgary, Alberta, Canada

Figure skating career
- Country: Canada
- Skating club: Calgary WC
- Retired: 1982
Medal record
Representing Canada
Men's Figure skating
World Championships
Bronze medal – third place	1982 Copenhagen	Men's singles
World Junior Championships
Bronze medal – third place	1976 Megève	Men's singles

Brian James Pockar (October 27, 1959 – April 28, 1992) was a Canadian figure skater, Olympian, and sports commentator. A native of Calgary, Alberta, he was the 1982 World bronze medalist, a three-time Canadian national champion (1978–80), and competed at the 1980 Winter Olympics.

== Life and Career ==
Brian Pockar achieved success in figure skating at the Provincial, National, and International levels. He was a three-time Canadian national champion, with six consecutive podium finishes at the Canadian Figure Skating Championships beginning in 1977, including three straight wins from 1978 to 1980. He won bronze at the 1982 World Figure Skating Championships and placed 12th at the 1980 Olympic Winter Games in Lake Placid, NY. Pockar also had a pair of podium finishes at Skate Canada International, claiming bronze in 1978 and silver in 1980. His third-place finish at the 1982 World Championships began a 14-year medal-winning streak by Canadian men.

Pockar was the first to successfully complete a triple one-foot Salchow/double flip combination jump at the world championships.

After turning professional in 1982, Pockar competed on the Pro-Skate circuit and won the 1984 World Professional Championships in Jaca, Spain and 1986 U.S. Open Professional Championship in Rochester, Minnesota. He also toured with Stars On Ice and Robin Cousins' "Electric Ice", and appeared in the television specials "Romeo and Juliet On Ice" as the lead opposite Dorothy Hamill and "The Magic Planet".

Following his skating career, Pockar went on to become a respected choreographer and a figure skating commentator and analyst with CTV Sports. He also served as the artistic director of the 1988 Calgary Winter Olympics closing ceremonies.

== Awards & Legacy ==
Pockar is recognized as one of Canada's best athletes. He was presented with five Alberta Achievement Awards and in 1982 was presented with the Government of Canada Sport Excellence Award. He was inducted into the Alberta Sports Hall of Fame in 1989. In 2012, Pockar was inducted posthumously into the Skate Canada Hall of Fame in the athlete category.

In his honour, the Pockar Foundation provides annual support for the Skate Canada: Alberta-NWT/Nunavut Brian Pockar Male and Mini-Male Seminars. As well, the Brian Pockar Award is presented annually at the Skate Canada: Alberta-NWT/Nunavut Awards Banquet to the Juvenile Men’s Champion at the Sectional Championships.

== Personal life and death ==
Pockar never declared his sexuality publicly, not unusual for the time. According to Brian Orser's affidavit in connection with a palimony lawsuit, Pockar came out during his employment as a commentator, which Orser says led to Pockar being fired. In Scott Hamilton's 1999 autobiography Landing It, Hamilton credited Pockar as one of the people who helped Hamilton reverse his homophobia. In his book Zero Tollerance, Toller Cranston relates what happened when Pockar first told him of having AIDS: "We talked as skater to skater, brother to brother, father to son, human to human, artist to artist. We had to talk, because there wasn't much time left. We talked without emotion. We talked about anything that had to be said. I told him things that went to the grave with him, and he told me certain things that I can never disclose to anyone. We traded notes and confidences. The next day I had to skate again in the freezing little rink, but we vowed to meet a second time. Three nights running, we met at the same restaurant, the same table, had the same drinks, and talked."

Pockar died of AIDS in 1992 at the age of 32.

== Competitive highlights ==
International
Event	73–74	74–75	75–76	76–77	77–78	78–79	79–80	80–81	81–82
Olympics							12th		
Worlds				14th	10th	13th	9th	8th	3rd
Skate Canada				11th	5th	3rd		2nd	
Nebelhorn					4th				
St. Gervais					2nd				
International: Junior
Junior Worlds			3rd						
National
Canada	3rd J	4th J	5th	2nd	1st	1st	1st	2nd	2nd
J = Junior level
