= Stefanie Pesendorfer =

Austrian figure skater (born 2003)

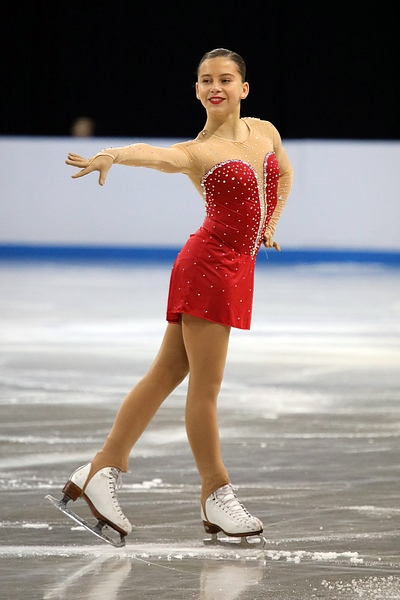

Personal information
- Born: 31 August 2003 (age 23) Wels, Austria
- Home town: Marchtrenk, Austria
- Height: 1.60 m (5 ft 3 in)

Figure skating career
- Country: Austria
- Discipline: Women's singles
- Coach: Niko Ulanovsky; Ria Schiffner
- Skating club: Union Eissportklub Linz
- Began skating: 2007

Medal record
Austrian Championships
Gold medal – first place	2022 Graz	Singles
Silver medal – second place	2024 Feldkirch	Singles
Bronze medal – third place	2020 Klagenfurt	Singles
Bronze medal – third place	2023 St. Pölten	Singles

Stefanie Pesendorfer (born 31 August 2003) is an Austrian figure skater. She is the 2019 Tirnavia Ice Cup champion, the 2019 Prague Ice Cup champion, and the 2022 Austrian champion. She finished twelfth at the 2018 World Junior Championships and competed at the 2022 World Championships.

== Personal life ==
Pesendorfer was born on 31 August 2003 in Wels, Austria. She went to high school at Handelsschule für Leistungssport in Linz.

== Career ==
=== Early years ===
Pesendorfer began learning to skate in 2007, at age four. After impressing in a kindergarten course, she joined Union Eissportklub in Linz. She competed in the advanced novice ranks from October 2015 through April 2017.

=== 2017–2018 season ===
Coached by Denise Jaschek and Markus Haider in Linz, Pesendorfer made her international junior debut at the ISU Junior Grand Prix in Austria in August 2017. She finished sixteenth at JGP Austria and twelfth at her second JGP assignment, in Zagreb, Croatia. Pesendorfer said she was told by her coaches to lose weight as her body began to go through puberty and that she was not given any nutrition advice by Skate Austria.

In December, she won the junior ladies title at the 2018 Austrian Championships and was assigned to the 2018 World Junior Championships in Sofia, Bulgaria. Competing in March at Junior Worlds, Pesendorfer qualified for the free skate after placing thirteenth in the short program. She finished twelfth overall. Hers was the best Austrian placement in 20 years.

Shortly after the World Junior Championships, she injured her back.

=== 2018–2019 season ===
Pesendorfer sat out the 2018–19 ISU Junior Grand Prix series, competing only at the 2018 Golden Bear of Zagreb and 2018 Skate Celje in the fall. At Skate Celje, she won the junior bronze medal.

At the 2019 Austrian Championships, Pesendorfer won the junior silver medal behind Olga Mikutina. She was assigned to the 2019 European Youth Olympic Winter Festival, where she placed seventh.

=== 2019–2020 season ===
Competing on the Junior Grand Prix, Pesendorfer placed eleventh at JGP France and seventeenth at JGP Russia. Making her debut in international senior competition, she competed at three events on the Challenger series, placing ninth at Nebelhorn Trophy, eleventh at the Nepela Memorial, and fifteenth at the Golden Spin of Zagreb.

Placing second at junior nationals for the second consecutive season and then winning bronze in her senior national debut, Pesendorfer finished the season with a fifteenth-placed finish at the 2020 World Junior Championships.

=== 2020–2021 season ===
Debuting at the 2020 CS Nebelhorn Trophy, an event attended only by European skaters due to pandemic-related travel restrictions, Pesendorfer placed twelfth.

Pesendorfer was diagnosed with two herniated disks in her back; doctors gave her a 30 percent chance of being able to return to skating competitively after surgery. She underwent the surgery as well as months of physiotherapy, and she did not begin skating again until July.

=== 2021–2022 season ===
Pesendorfer placed sixteenth at the 2021 CS Lombardia Trophy. She went on to win the bronze medal at two minor internationals and finish fifteenth at the 2021 CS Cup of Austria before winning the Austrian national title. Pesendorfer was struggling to train or carry out normal activities; she was diagnosed with depression and prescribed medication.

Despite her national title, Pesendorfer was not named to the Austrian Olympic team. However, she made her World Championship debut and finished thirty-second.

=== 2022–2023 season ===
Pesendorfer moved to a new skating club in Oberstdorf. She began to suffer from panic attacks and became suicidal; clubmates connected her to emergency services. Skate Austria reacted by hiring a psychologist and beginning athlete mental health services.

Beginning the season on the Challenger circuit, Pesendorfer finished in eighth place at both the 2022 CS Nebelhorn Trophy and the 2022 CS Nepela Memorial, before coming tenth at the 2022 CS Ice Challenge. She won medals at a number of other minor internationals, and took the bronze medal at the Austrian championships.

=== 2023–2024 season ===
Competing at the 2023 CS Nebelhorn Trophy, Pesendorfer came in twelfth place. Going on to compete at the 2023 CS Budapest Trophy, Pesendorfer placed fourteenth in the short program but withdrew prior to the free skate. She subsequently competed at the 2023 NRW Trophy where she would place fourth.

At the 2024 Austrian Championships, Pesendorfer won the silver medal behind Olga Mikutina. She then closed the season by finishing fifth at the 2024 Dragon Trophy.

=== 2024–2025 season ===
In August 2024, it was announced that Pesendorfer had left her longtime coaches, Denise Jaschek and Markus Haider, and moved to Oberstdorf, Germany, to train with Niko Ulanovsky and Ria Schiffner.

Beginning the season at the 2024 Trophée Métropole Nice Côte d'Azur in mid-October, Pesendorfer finished fourteenth. She followed this by placing seventh at the 2024 Santa Claus Cup.

In December, Pesendorfer competed at the 2025 Austrian Championships, where she finished fourth. She was selected to compete at the 2025 European Championships. In January, she won the bronze medal at the Bavarian Open before going on to compete at the European Championships the next week, where she placed twenty-third overall.

She finished the season by winning gold at the 2025 Merano Ice Trophy.

=== 2025–2026 season ===
Pesendorfer did not compete due to a stress fracture in her foot. In January 2026, Pesendorfer gave an interview in Die Zeit where she discussed her mental health issues and pressure to lose weight.

== Programs ==
Season	Short program	Free skating
2024–25	Caruso performed by Jackie Evancho choreo. by Joti Polizoakis, Vitali Schulz, Ria Schiffner	Mountains (from Interstellar) by Hans Zimmer; Solas x Interstella by Gabriel Albuqerqüe; Outro by M83 choreo. by Joti Polizoakis, Vitali Schulz, Ria Schiffner
2023–24	The One That You Love by LP choreo. by Kelly Johnson	Game of Survival by Ruelle; Quick Musical Doodles by Two Feet choreo. by Kelly Johnson
2022–23	The One That You Love by LP choreo. by Kelly Johnson	Game of Survival by Ruelle; Quick Musical Doodles by Two Feet choreo. by Kelly Johnson
2020–22	River; Wild Horses by Bishop Briggs choreo. by Tatjana Schröck	Anything Goes written by Cole Porter performed by Riverdale cast; Back to Black written by Amy Winehouse & Mark Ronson performed by Beyoncé; Got My Number by Serena Ryder choreo. by Romain Gazave
2019–20	Radar Love by Golden Earring choreo by Kelly Johnson	Anything Goes written by Cole Porter performed by Riverdale cast; Back to Black written by Amy Winehouse & Mark Ronson performed by Beyoncé; Got My Number by Serena Ryder choreo. by Romain Gazave
2018–19	Radar Love by Golden Earring choreo by Kelly Johnson	The Last of Her Kind; The Vampire Masquerade by Peter Gundry
2017–18	Pa' Bailar by Bajofondo	The Last of Her Kind; The Vampire Masquerade by Peter Gundry

== Competitive highlights ==
- JGP – Event of the ISU Junior Grand Prix Series
- CS – Event of the ISU Challenger Series
- TBD – Assigned
- WD – Withdrew from competition

Competition placements at senior level
Season	2019–20	2020–21	2021–22	2022–23	2023–24	2024–25
World Championships			32nd			
European Championships						23rd
Austrian Championships	3rd		1st	3rd	2nd	4th
CS Budapest Trophy					WD	
CS Golden Spin of Zagreb	15th					9th
CS Ice Challenge			15th	10th		
CS Lombardia Trophy			16th			
CS Nebelhorn Trophy	9th	12th		8th	12th	
CS Nepela Memorial	11th			8th		
CS Trophée Métropole Nice						14th
Abu Dhabi Classic Trophy				1st		
Bavarian Open			4th			3rd
Challenge Cup			9th			
Dragon Trophy				3rd	5th	
Merano Ice Trophy						1st
NRW Trophy				2nd	4th	
Prague Ice Cup	1st					
Santa Claus Cup						7th
Skate Celje			3rd			
Sofia Trophy			1st			
Tirnavia Ice Cup	1st		3rd	1st		

Competition placements at junior level
Season	2017–18	2018–19	2019–20
World Junior Championships	12th		15th
Austrian Championships	1st	2nd	2nd
JGP Austria	16th		
JGP Croatia	12th		
JGP France			11th
JGP Russia			17th
Bavarian Open		4th	
Challenge Cup	3rd		
Dragon Trophy	2nd		
European Youth Olympic Festival		7th	
Golden Bear of Zagreb	4th	12th	2nd
Leu Scheu Memorial	2nd		
Skate Celje	3rd	3rd	1st
Triglav Trophy		1st	

== Detailed results ==
ISU personal best scores in the +5/-5 GOE System
Segment	Type	Score	Event
Total	TSS	154.31	2022 CS Nebelhorn Trophy
Short program	TSS	56.53	2024 CS Golden Spin of Zagreb
Short program	TES	31.32	2020 World Junior Championships
Short program	PCS	26.47	2024 CS Golden Spin of Zagreb
Free skating	TSS	101.53	2022 CS Nebelhorn Trophy
Free skating	TES	54.58	2019 JGP France
Free skating	PCS	51.26	2022 CS Nebelhorn Trophy

ISU personal best scores in the +3/-3 GOE System
Segment	Type	Score	Event
Total	TSS	153.70	2018 World Junior Championships
Short program	TSS	54.16	2018 World Junior Championships
Short program	TES	32.75	2018 World Junior Championships
Short program	PCS	21.41	2018 World Junior Championships
Free skating	TSS	99.54	2018 World Junior Championships
Free skating	TES	54.24	2018 World Junior Championships
Free skating	PCS	45.30	2018 World Junior Championships

=== Senior level ===
Results in the 2024–25 season
Date	Event	SP		FS		Total	
Date	Event	P	Score	P	Score	P	Score
16–20 Oct 2024	(France) 2024 CS Trophée Métropole Nice Côte d'Azur	11	49.96	14	89.44	14	139.40
27 Nov – 2 December 2024	(Hungary) 2024 Santa Claus Cup	4	53.06	10	87.32	7	140.38
5–7 Dec 2024	(Croatia) 2024 CS Golden Spin of Zagreb	7	56.53	13	96.67	9	153.20
11–14 Dec 2024	(Austria) 2025 Austrian Championships	4	48.09	4	89.23	4	137.32
20–26 Jan 2025	(Germany) 2025 Bavarian Open	1	57.28	3	104.68	3	161.96
28 Jan – 2 Feb 2025	(Estonia) 2025 European Championships	21	48.95	23	79.07	23	128.02
13–16 Feb 2025	(Italy) 2025 Merano Ice Trophy	1	55.28	1	102.49	1	157.77

2023–2024 season
Date	Event	SP	FS	Total
7–9 February 2024	2024 Dragon Trophy	4; 55.74	5; 95.57	5; 1151.31
13–17 December 2023	2024 Austrian Championships	1; 58.62	2; 114.31	2; 166.69
16–19 November 2023	2023 NRW Trophy	4; 46.70	5; 83.15	4; 129.85
20–23 September 2023	2023 CS Nebelhorn Trophy	10; 51.43	13; 81.31	12; 132.74
2022–2023 season
Date	Event	SP	FS	Total
9–13 November 2022	2022 CS Ice Challenge	8; 53.92	11; 100.08	10; 154.00
28–30 October 2022	2022 Tirnavia Ice Cup	4; 51.48	1; 106.44	1; 157.92
29 September – 1 October 2022	2022 CS Nepela Memorial	6; 49.28	10; 84.47	8; 133.75
21–24 September 2022	2022 CS Nebelhorn Trophy	9; 52.78	7; 101.53	8; 154.31
2021–2022 season
Date	Event	SP	FS	Total
21–27 March 2022	2022 World Championships	32; 47.23	-	32; 47.23
24–27 February 2022	2022 Challenge Cup	12; 50.28	8; 93.41	9; 143.69
2–6 February 2022	2022 Sofia Trophy	1; 60.35	1; 112.86	1; 173.21
18–23 January 2022	2022 Bavarian Open	6; 52.46	3; 110.41	4; 162.87
18–21 November 2021	2021 Skate Celje	2; 60.15	4; 92.62	3; 152.77
11–14 November 2021	2021 CS Cup of Austria	22; 45.78	10; 99.46	15; 145.24
28–31 October 2021	2021 Tirnavia Ice Cup	3; 49.00	3; 95.62	3; 144.62
10–12 September 2021	2021 CS Lombardia Trophy	22; 46.85	13; 94.12	16; 140.97
2020–2021 season
Date	Event	SP	FS	Total
23–26 September 2020	2020 CS Nebelhorn Trophy	20; 35.90	6; 96.01	12; 131.91
2019–2020 season
Date	Event	SP	FS	Total
12–14 December 2019	2020 Austrian Championships	3; 56.43	3; 91.66	3; 148.09
4–7 December 2019	2019 Golden Spin	12; 49.64	16; 89.42	15; 139.06
8–10 November 2019	2019 Prague Ice Cup	3; 51.09	1; 109.26	1; 160.35
31 October – 3 November 2019	2019 Tirnavia Ice Cup	1; 55.22	1; 104.66	1; 159.88
25–28 September 2019	2019 Nebelhorn Trophy	12; 47.75	8; 98.91	9; 146.66
19–21 September 2019	2019 Nepela Memorial	12; 47.32	11; 88.69	11; 136.01

=== Junior level ===
2019–2020 season
Date	Event	SP	FS	Total
2–8 March	2020 World Junior Championships	16; 53.67	15; 96.87	15; 150.54
12-14 December 2019	2020 Austrian Junior Championships	2; 50.06	1; 98.06	2; 148.12
22-24 November 2019	2019 Skate Celje	3; 45.50	1; 92.88	1; 138.38
24-27 October 2019	2019 Golden Bear	4; 52.25	1; 96.07	2; 148.32
11-14 September 2019	2019 JGP Russia	14; 48.72	18; 86.22	17; 134.94
21-24 August 2019	2019 JGP France	13; 50.30	9; 98.70	11; 149.00
2018–2019 season
Date	Event	SP	FS	Total
10-14 April 2019	2019 Triglav Trophy	2; 46.39	1; 93.74	1; 140.13
13-14 February 2019	2019 EYOF	8; 49.35	6; 97.66	7; 147.01
5-10 February 2019	2019 Bavarian Open	4; 51.31	4; 95.70	4; 147.01
13-16 December 2018	2019 Austrian Junior Championships	2; 51.08	2; 97.35	2; 148.43
22-25 November 2018	2018 Skate Celje	4; 41.71	3; 81.72	3; 123.43
25-28 October 2018	2018 Golden Bear	15; 42.06	10; 84.17	12; 126.23
2017–2018 season
Date	Event	SP	FS	Total
5-11 March 2018	2018 World Junior Championships	13; 54.16	12; 99.54	12; 153.70
22-25 February 2018	2018 Challenge Cup	3; 54.49	3; 104.63	3; 159.12
8-11 February 2018	2018 Dragon Trophy	8; 42.45	2; 90.39	2; 132.84
13-16 December 2017	2018 Austrian Junior Championships	2; 50.45	1; 95.11	1; 145.56
22-26 November 2017	2017 Skate Celje	9; 38.97	2; 74.85	3; 113.82
8-12 November 2017	2017 Leo Scheu (Ice Challenge)	6; 43.39	2; 89.32	2; 132.71
26-29 October 2017	2017 Golden Bear	2; 50.60	7; 85.31	4; 135.91
27-30 September 2017	2017 JGP Croatia	12; 45.65	12; 84.94	12; 130.59
30 August - 2 September 2017	2017 JGP Austria	16; 42.69	17; 75.23	16; 117.92
