= Dennis Coi =

Canadian figure skater (1961–1987)

Personal information
- Born: 11 August 1961
- Died: 1 September 1987 (aged 26)

Figure skating career
- Country: Canada
- Partner: Julie Mutchen (former)
- Skating club: North Shore WC

Dennis Coi (11 August 1961 – 1 September 1987) was a Canadian figure skater. He was the 1978 World Junior Champion and the 1982 Canadian bronze medallist. Coi also competed in pair skating; with partner Julie Mutchen, he was the 1974 Canadian novice bronze medallist.

== AIDS-related death ==
Coi was gay, although he did not come out even to his own family until being diagnosed with HIV. He died of AIDS in 1987, amid a spate of AIDS-related deaths of Canadian figure skaters, including Brian Pockar, Robert McCall and Shaun McGill, which was portrayed in the media as a major crisis for the sport.

== Competitive highlights ==
=== Men's singles ===
International
Event	77–78	78–79	79–80	80–81	81–82	82–83	83–84
Skate Canada							10th
Prize of Moscow News						9th	6th
Nebelhorn Trophy					4th		
AEGON Cup	3rd	4th		3rd			
International: Junior
World Junior Champ.	1st						
National
Canadian Champ.	1st J	7th		7th	3rd	5th	4th
J = Junior level

=== Pairs with Mutchen ===
National
Event	1973–74
Canadian Championships	3rd N
N = Junior level
