= Jacek Jasiaczek =

Polish ice dancer

Personal information
- Born: 14 February 1962
- Died: 21 April 2025 (aged 63)

Figure skating career
- Country: Poland
- Partner: Iwona Bielas
- Coach: Maria Olszewska-Lelonkiewicz
- Skating club: KS Społem Łódź
- Retired: 1980s

Jacek Jasiaczek (Polish pronunciation: [ˈjat͡sɛk jaˈɕat͡ʂɛk]; 14 February 1962 – 21 April 2025) was a Polish former competitive ice dancer. With Iwona Bielas, he won the 1981 Polish national title and competed at three ISU Championships. They finished 11th at the 1979 World Junior Championships in Augsburg, West Germany; 9th at the 1980 World Junior Championships in Megève, France; and 18th at the 1981 European Championships in Innsbruck, Austria.

Bielas/Jasiaczek trained at Klub Sportowy Społem in Łódź, Poland. They attended IX Liceum Ogólnokształcące im. Jarosława Dąbrowskiego in Łódź.

== Competitive highlights ==
With Bielas

International
Event	1978–79	1979–80	1980–81
European Championships			18th
World Junior Championships	11th	9th	
National
Polish Championships			1st
