= Peter Carruthers (figure skater) =

American figure skater and commentator

Personal information
- Full name: Peter W. Carruthers
- Born: July 22, 1959 (age 66) Boston, Massachusetts
- Height: 1.80 m (5 ft 11 in)

Figure skating career
- Country: United States
- Partner: Kitty Carruthers
- Skating club: SC of Wilmington
- Retired: 1984
Medal record
Representing United States
Pairs' Figure skating
Olympic Games
Silver medal – second place	1984 Sarajevo	Pairs
World Championships
Bronze medal – third place	1982 Copenhagen	Pairs

Peter W. Carruthers (born July 22, 1959) is an American former pair ice skater and a television skating analyst.

Carruthers and his adopted sister, Kitty Carruthers, are the 1984 Olympic Silver medalists, the 1982 World Bronze medalists, and four-time United States National champions from 1981 to 1984.

== Career ==
The Carruthers team finished off the podium at the U.S. Championships in January 1979; however, their results improved during the following season. After winning the International St. Gervais in August 1979, they went on to win the Gold at the Nebelhorn Trophy and Silver at the 1979 Norton Skate (the inaugural Skate America). They placed second at the 1980 U.S. Championships, and were assigned to their first Winter Olympics, where they finished in fifth place. They won their first U.S. National title in 1981, and stepped onto the World podium at the 1982 World Championships, coming in third place. In 1984, after winning their forth National title, they were sent to their second Winter Olympics and won the silver medal. They were also cast members of Champions on Ice during that time.

Following the 1984 Winter Olympics, the Carruthers turned professional and starred with Ice Capades and Stars on Ice. For 12 years, they appeared throughout the world in many productions and made for television specials.

The Carruthers were inducted into the United States Figure Skating Hall of Fame in 1999.

The Carruthers siblings were coached by Ronald Ludington.

After retiring from professional skating, Carruthers became a "successful and respected television commentator", working as a skating analyst for the Fox, ABC, and ESPN television networks. In 2010, he worked as a daily NBC Olympics skating broadcast analyst on NBC's Universal Sports network.

== Competitive highlights with Kitty Carruthers ==
International
Event	1978–79	1979–80	1980–81	1981–82	1982–83	1983–84
Winter Olympics		5th				2nd
World Championships		7th	5th	3rd	4th	
Skate America		2nd		2nd		1st
NHK Trophy				1st		
Nebelhorn Trophy		1st				
St. Gervais		1st				
National
U.S. Championships	7th	2nd	1st	1st	1st	1st
