= Balázs Major =

Hungarian ice dancer (born 1990)

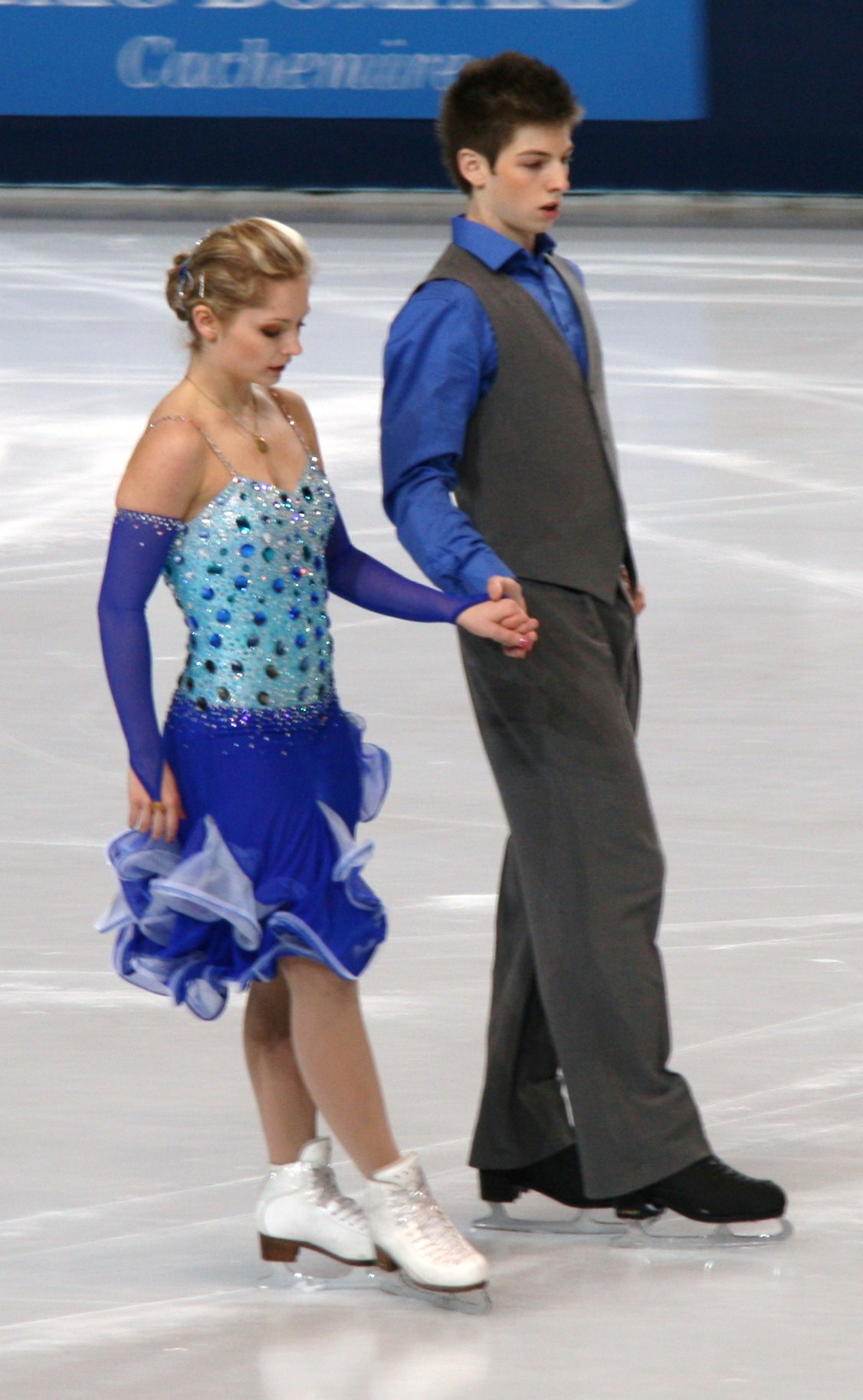
- Balázs Major with his partner Dóra Turóczi in 2010

Personal information
- Born: 18 December 1990 (age 35) Budapest, Hungary
- Home town: Budapest
- Height: 1.75 m (5 ft 9 in)

Figure skating career
- Country: Hungary
- Partner: Carolina Moscheni, Dóra Turóczi, Krisztina Barta
- Coach: Ilona Berecz, Muriel Zazoui, Olivier Schoenfelder
- Skating club: Sportország SC
- Began skating: 1999
- Retired: 2016

Balázs Major (born 18 December 1990 in Budapest) is a Hungarian former competitive ice dancer. With Dóra Turóczi, he is the 2014 national champion. They competed in the final segment at two World Junior Championships, finishing 12th in 2010. They also appeared at two World Championships, two European Championships, and two senior Grand Prix events.

They were coached by Ilona Berecz in Budapest, and by Muriel Zazoui and Olivier Schoenfelder in Lyon, France.

== Programs ==
=== With Moscheni ===
Season	Short dance	Free dance
2015–2016	Waltz: Fascination performed by André Rieu; Polka: Hungarian Polka by J. Strauss	Carmen Fantaisie performed by David Garrett; Me voy by Yasmin Levy; Carmen Fantaisie performed by David Garrett

=== With Turóczi ===
Season	Short dance	Free dance
2013–2014	Quickstep: That Man by Caro Emerald; Charleston: Dixie Biscuit	Die Csárdásfürstin by Emmerich Kálmán
2012–2013	Star Wars by John Williams; The Imperial March; Cantina Band	A Los Amigos by Astor Piazzolla
2011–2012	Sway by The Pussycat Dolls; Do You Only Wanna Dance by Mya	GoldenEye performed by Tina Turner
2010–2011	Padam, padam... by Édith Piaf; Sing, Sing, Sing	Be Italian (from Nine) performed by Fergie
	Original dance	
2009–2010	Csárdás (Hungarian folk dance)	The Mask; Hi De Ho; This Business of Love; Hey! Pachuco!
2008–2009	Linger in My Arms a Little Longer by Louis Armstrong; Life's to Go Party; Jumpin' at the Woodside by Benny Goodman	1492: Conquest of Paradise by Vangelis
2007–2008	Bubamara by Dejan Sparavato	Pirates of the Caribbean: The Curse of the Black Pearl by Klaus Badelt

== Competitive highlights ==
GP: Grand Prix; CS: Challenger Series; JGP: Junior Grand Prix

=== With Moscheni ===
International
Event	2015–16
European Championships	27th
CS Golden Spin of Zagreb	7th

=== With Turóczi ===
International
Event	07–08	08–09	09–10	10–11	11–12	12–13	13–14
World Champ.				21st			28th
European Champ.					23rd		21st
GP Bompard				8th			
GP NHK Trophy				10th			
Bavarian Open					10th		
Cup of Nice							8th
Golden Spin						13th	
Ice Challenge				7th	9th		
Istanbul Cup					7th		
Mont Blanc Trophy					7th		
Nebelhorn Trophy							17th
Nepela Memorial							8th
P. Roman Memorial						13th	2nd
Volvo Open Cup							6th
Winter Universiade				8th			10th
International: Junior
World Junior Champ.		21st	12th				
JGP Czech Republic		8th					
JGP France		14th					
JGP Hungary			10th				
JGP Romania	9th						
JGP Turkey			10th				
JGP United Kingdom	15th						
P. Roman Memorial	5th J		3rd J				
Tirnavia Ice Cup			1st J				
Santa Claus Cup			1st J				
National
Hungarian Champ.			1st J	3rd	2nd	2nd	1st
J = Junior level; WD = Withdrew
