= Anna Litvinenko =

British figure skater

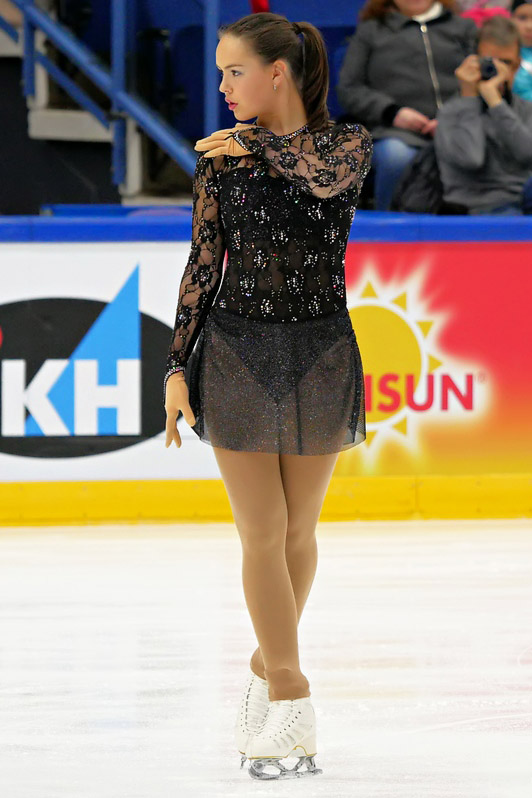
- Litvinenko at the 2017 Finlandia Trophy

Personal information
- Born: 15 February 2001 (age 25) Norwich, England
- Home town: Guildford, England
- Height: 1.70 m (5 ft 7 in)

Figure skating career
- Country: United Kingdom
- Coach: Veronika Bogomolova
- Skating club: Guildford IFSC Surrey
- Began skating: 2008
- Retired: December 2, 2020

Anna Victoria Litvinenko (born 15 February 2001) is a British former figure skater and 2017 Team GB member. She is a five-time junior medallist at the British national championships and has most notably competed at the 2015 ISU Junior Grand Prix in the United States, the 2016 ISU Junior Grand Prix in Slovenia, the 2016 ISU CS Warsaw Cup, the 2017 ISU Junior Grand Prix in Latvia, the 2017 ISU CS Finlandia Trophy, the 2018 ISU Junior Grand Prix in Lithuania and the 2018 CS Inge Solar Memorial – Alpen Trophy. In 2017 she was named Youth Sports Personality of the Year (Denninberg Shield) by Sport Godalming.

Litvinenko was coached by Veronika Bogomolova at the Guildford IFSC in Guildford, England.

== Career ==
=== Early career ===
Litvinenko began ice skating in 2008 at the age of seven, after receiving ice skates as a present. She began skating internationally in 2011, and first skated at the British national championships in the 2012–13 season, ultimately reaching number 1 in the national rankings at the advanced novice level in 2013.

=== Junior career ===
At the junior level, Litvinenko's international debut was at the 2014 Merano Cup, where she was placed 11th. In the 2015–16 season, she went on to achieve podium positions at both the Tirnavia Edea Ice Cup and the Golden Bear of Zagreb. She also debuted in the ISU Junior Grand Prix series in the 2015–16 season, placing 20th in the United States. In the 2016–17 season, she continued in the JGP series and was placed 20th in Slovenia. She was placed on podium positions at the British national championships in five consecutive seasons: she was awarded the silver medal in the 2014–15 season and bronze medals in the 2015–16, 2016–17, 2017-18 and 2018-19 seasons. She was selected to represent Great Britain at the 2017 European Youth Olympic Winter Festival in Erzurum, Turkey. She has also placed first at the Tirnavia Ice Cup in both the 2017-18 and 2018-19 seasons.

=== Senior career ===
At the senior level, Litvinenko made her international debut at the 2016 Denkova-Staviski Cup, where she was awarded the bronze medal. She also came in 8th place at the 2017 Skate Helena competition. In the 2016–17 season, she debuted in the ISU Challenger Series, achieving 18th place in Poland. She was placed 6th in the British national championships in the same season. She was placed 15th in Finland and 23rd in Austria in the ISU Challenger Series in the 2017-18 and 2018-19 seasons respectively. She was placed 7th in the British national championships in the 2018–19 season.

She announced her retirement from the sport in December 2020.

== Programs ==
| Season | Short program | Free skating |
|---|---|---|
| 2018–19 | "California Dreamin'" by John Phillips and Michelle Phillips | "Sherlocked" and "Irene's theme" soundtracks from TV Sherlock Series 2. by David Arnold and Michael Price |
| 2017–18 | Je suis malade (performed by Lara Fabian) by Serge Lama | "Sherlocked" and "Irene's theme" soundtracks from TV Sherlock Series 2. by David Arnold and Michael Price |
| 2016–17 | The Penguins of Madagascar by Lorne Balfe | Tango de los Exiliados (performed by Vanessa-Mae) by Walter Taieb |
| 2015–16 | Leeloos Theme by Tonči Huljić | Tango de los Exiliados (performed by Vanessa-Mae) by Walter Taieb |

== Competitive highlights ==
CS: Challenger Series; JGP: Junior Grand Prix

International
| Event | 12–13 | 13–14 | 14–15 | 15–16 | 16–17 | 17–18 | 18–19 | 19–20 |
|---|---|---|---|---|---|---|---|---|
| CS Alpen Trophy | | | | | | | 23rd | |
| CS Finlandia | | | | | | 15th | | |
| CS Warsaw Cup | | | | | 11th | | | |
| Denkova-Staviski | | | | | 3rd | | | |
| Skate Helena | | | | | 8th | | | |
International: Junior
| JGP Latvia | | | | | | 16th | | |
| JGP Lithuania | | | | | | | 22nd | |
| JGP Slovenia | | | | | 20th | | | |
| JGP Poland | | | | | | | | 33rd |
| JGP U.S. | | | | 20th | | | | |
| EYOF | | | | | 7th | | | |
| Golden Bear | | | | 3rd | | | | |
| Ice Star | | | | | | | 9th | |
| Tirnavia Ice Cup | | | | 2nd | | 1st | 1st | |
| Toruń Cup | | | 4th | | | | | |
| Merano Cup | | | 11th | | | | | |
International: Advanced novice
| Crystal Skate | | 3rd | | | | | | |
National
| British Champ. | | | | | 6th | | 7th | |
| British Junior Champ. | 12th N | 28th N | 2nd J | | 3rd J | 3rd J | 3rd J | |
Levels: N = Novice; J = Junior
