= Vitali Egorov =

Soviet figure skater

Personal information
- Native name: Віталій Вікторович Єгоров
- Full name: Vitaliy Viktorovych Yehorov
- Born: 23 March 1964 (age 62) Kharkiv, Ukrainian SSR

Figure skating career
- Country: Soviet Union
Medal record
Representing Soviet Union
Figure skating: Men's singles
World Junior Championships
| Gold medal – first place | 1979 Augsburg | Men's singles |
| Silver medal – second place | 1980 Megéve | Men's singles |
Winter Universiade
| Silver medal – second place | 1983 Sofia | Men's singles |
| Silver medal – second place | 1987 Strbské Pleso | Men's singles |

Vitaliy Viktorovych Yehorov or Vitali Egorov (Ukrainian: Віталій Вікторович Єгоров, born 23 March 1964) is a former competitive figure skater for the Soviet Union. He is the 1986 Skate Canada International champion, the 1986 Nebelhorn Trophy champion, the 1979 World Junior champion, a two-time (1983, 1987) Winter Universiade silver medalist, and the 1984 Soviet national champion.

Egorov was one of the first skaters in the world to land a triple Axel jump, performing it in April 1981, at the USSR Cup competition in Sverdlovsk, where he won the bronze medal. In March 1982, he won the 5th USSR Winter Spartakiada. He is a coach in Kharkiv.

== Results ==
International
| Event | 78–79 | 79–80 | 80–81 | 81–82 | 82–83 | 83–84 | 84–85 | 85–86 | 86–87 |
|---|---|---|---|---|---|---|---|---|---|
| Europeans | | | | | | 7th | | | |
| Skate Canada | | | | | | | | | 1st |
| Nebelhorn Trophy | | | | | | | | | 1st |
| Moscow News | | | | 3rd | | | | 3rd | 2nd |
| Prague Skate | 4th | | | | | | | | |
| Universiade | | | | | 2nd | | | | 2nd |
International: Junior
| Junior Worlds | 1st | 2nd | | | | | | | |
National
| Soviet Champ | | | | | 3rd | 1st | 2nd | 3rd | 3rd |
