= Kitty Carruthers =

American figure skater

Personal information
- Full name: Caitlin A. Carruthers
- Born: May 30, 1961 (age 65) Boston, Massachusetts, U.S.
- Height: 5 ft 0 in (1.52 m)

Figure skating career
- Country: United States
- Partner: Peter Carruthers
- Skating club: SC of Wilmington
- Retired: 1984
Medal record
Pairs' figure skating
Representing United States
Olympic Games
Silver medal – second place	1984 Sarajevo	Pairs
World Championships
Bronze medal – third place	1982 Copenhagen	Pairs

Caitlin A. "Kitty" Carruthers (born May 30, 1961) is an American former pair skater. With her adoptive brother, Peter Carruthers, she is the 1984 Olympic Silver medalist, a 1982 World Bronze medalist, and a four-time (1981–1984) United States National champion.

== Career ==
The Carruthers siblings were coached by Ronald Ludington.

They finished off the podium at the U.S. Championships in January 1979 but their results improved the following season. After winning the International St. Gervais in late August 1979, the pair went on to take gold at the Nebelhorn Trophy and silver at the 1979 Norton Skate (the inaugural Skate America). They placed second at the 1980 U.S. Championships and were assigned to their first Winter Olympics, where they finished fifth. The pair won their first U.S. National title in 1981 and stepped onto the World podium at the 1982 World Championships. In 1984, after winning their fourth national title, they were sent to their second Winter Olympics and won the silver medal. They were also cast members of Champions on Ice during that time.

Following the 1984 Winter Olympics, the Carruthers siblings starred with "Ice Capades" and "Stars on Ice" for twelve years. They appeared throughout the world in many productions and made for television specials during their twelve-year career as professionals. They were inducted into the Adoption Hall of Fame in 1996 and into the United States Figure Skating Hall of Fame in 1999. After retiring, she became a coach.

== Competitive highlights ==
(with Peter Carruthers)

International
Event	1978–79	1979–80	1980–81	1981–82	1982–83	1983–84
Winter Olympics		5th				2nd
World Championships		7th	5th	3rd	4th	
Skate America		2nd		2nd		1st
NHK Trophy				1st		
Nebelhorn Trophy		1st				
St. Gervais		1st				
National
U.S. Championships	7th	2nd	1st	1st	1st	1st
