= Tatiana Durasova =

Soviet ice dancer

Personal information
- Full name: Tatiana Durasova

Figure skating career
- Country: Soviet Union
Medal record
Figure skating
Ice dancing
Representing Soviet Union
World Junior Championships
Gold medal – first place	1979 Augsburg	Ice dancing
Gold medal – first place	1978 Megève	Ice dancing

Tatiana Durasova is a former Soviet ice dancer. She was a two-time (1978, 1979) World Junior champion with partner Sergei Ponomarenko.

== Competitive highlights ==
(with Ponomarenko)

International
Event	1977–78	1978–79	1979–80
Nebelhorn Trophy			3rd
International: Junior
World Junior Championships	1st	1st	
