= Barbara Underhill =

Canadian pair skater and hockey skating coach

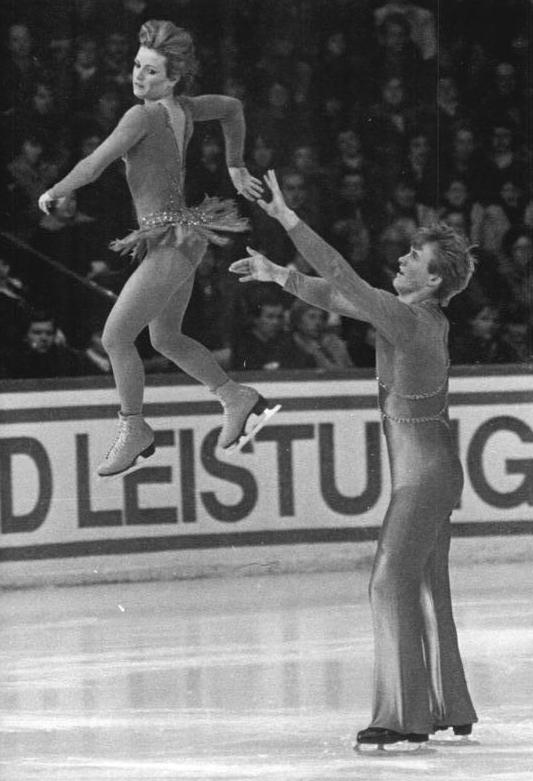
- Barbara Underhill and Paul Martini, March 1983

Personal information
- Full name: Barbara Ann Underhill
- Born: June 24, 1963 (age 63) Pembroke, Ontario
- Height: 5 ft (152 cm)

Figure skating career
- Country: Canada
- Partner: Paul Martini
- Skating club: Granite Club; Oshawa FSC
- Retired: April 1998
Medal record
Pairs' figure skating
Representing Canada
World Championships
Gold medal – first place	1984 Ottawa	Pairs
Bronze medal – third place	1983 Helsinki	Pairs
World Junior Championships
Gold medal – first place	1978 Megève	Pairs

Barbara Ann Underhill (born June 24, 1963) is a hockey skating coach and Canadian former pair skater. With partner Paul Martini, she is the 1984 World champion, the 1979–1983 Canadian national champion, and the 1978 World Junior champion. They represented Canada at the 1980 Winter Olympics, where they placed 9th, and at the 1984 Winter Olympics, where they placed 7th. In 2009, she was named to the World Figure Skating Hall of Fame. Since retiring from competition, Underhill has worked as a skating coach for several National Hockey League teams.

== Early life ==
Underhill was born in Pembroke, Ontario, Canada. She began skating at the age of 5.

== Career ==
=== Partnership with Martini ===
Underhill and Martini began skating together in the summer of 1977. They won gold in junior pairs at the 1978 Canadian figure skating championships. They also won the World Junior Championships that same year in Megève, France. In 1979, they won their first senior national title and made their World Championship debut, finishing 11th. They placed 9th at the 1980 Winter Olympics in Lake Placid, New York.

Underhill/Martini finished fourth at the 1982 World Championships in Copenhagen, having placed fifth in the short program and fourth in the free skate. The pair reached the podium at the 1983 World Championships in Helsinki. After placing third in both segments, they were awarded the bronze medal behind Elena Valova / Oleg Vasiliev of the Soviet Union and Sabine Baeß / Tassilo Thierbach of East Germany.

In February 1984, Underhill/Martini finished 7th at the Winter Olympics in Sarajevo. In March, they competed at the 1984 World Championships in Ottawa. Ranked second to Olympic gold medalists Valova/Vasiliev in the short program and first in the free skate, Underhill/Martini won Canada's first world figure skating title since Karen Magnussen in 1973.

=== Later career ===
Underhill worked for 16 years as a skating TV commentator until 2006. She then began working with hockey players to develop their speed and power. She initially worked with the Guelph Storm, of which her husband is a part owner. She then began working with NHL teams—first the Anaheim Ducks, followed by the New York Rangers and the Tampa Bay Lightning. Underhill was named in the 2011 edition of The Hockey News's list of the 100 most influential people in ice hockey due to her power skating coaching. Underhill joined the National Hockey League's Toronto Maple Leafs as the team's Skating Consultant on April 20, 2012. Underhill also appeared on CBC TV's Battle of the Blades.

== Personal life ==
Underhill married Rick Gaetz, with whom she has two sons, Matthew and Scott, all of whom are involved in hockey. On September 15, 1992, she had twin girls, Sam and Stephanie, but lost Stephanie in a drowning accident on Saturday, May 29, 1993. In 1998, she started the Stephanie Gaetz Keepsafe Foundation to reduce injuries in childhood, with a focus on water safety.

== Competitive highlights ==
(with Martini)

International
Event	77–78	78–79	79–80	80–81	81–82	82–83	83–84
Winter Olympics			9th				7th
World Champ.		11th	11th	7th	4th	3rd	1st
Skate America					1st		
NHK Trophy				1st		1st	
Prize of Moscow News			5th				
Nebelhorn Trophy		1st					
Ennia Challenge Cup		5th			1st		
St. Gervais		1st					
International: Junior
World Junior Champ.	1st						
National
Canadian Champ.	1st J.	1st	1st	1st	1st	1st	
J. = Junior level
