= The Great Eight (book) =

The Great Eight: How to Be Happy (even when you have every reason to be miserable)
- Author: Scott Hamilton
- Language: English
- Genre: Self-help
- Publisher: Thomas Nelson
- Publication date: January 6, 2009
- Publication place: United States
- Media type: Print (Hardcover)
- Pages: 183
- ISBN: 978-0-7852-2894-3
- OCLC: 234446423
- Dewey Decimal: 158 22
- LC Class: BF575.H27 H36 2008

The Great Eight: How to Be Happy (even when you have every reason to be miserable) is a self-help book written by Olympian figure skater Scott Hamilton.

== Summary ==
Gold Medal Olympian and Hall of Fame figure skater, Scott Hamilton has overcome multiple life-threatening challenges and disappointments in his life. In this autobiographical book, Hamilton uses stories from his life to illustrate the principles that have shaped his life.

Hamilton lists eight principles that he states will help readers live happier lives:

- Fall, Get Up, and Land Your First Jumps
- Trust Your Almighty Coach
- Make Your Losses Your Wins
- Keep the Ice Clear
- Think Positive, Laugh, and Smile Like Kristi Yamaguchi
- Win by Going Last
- Learn a New Routine
- Stand in the Spotlight
