= István Sugár =

Hungarian ice dancer (born 1942)

Personal information
- Born: 1942 (age 83–84)

Figure skating career
- Country: Hungary
- Partner: Ilona Berecz
- Retired: c. 1971

István Sugár (born 1942) is a Hungarian former ice dancer. With Ilona Berecz, he is a two-time Hungarian national champion and the 1968 Blue Swords bronze medalist. They finished in the top ten at three European Championships.

== Career ==
Sugár teamed up with Ilona Berecz around 1963. The duo finished in the top ten at the 1969 European Championships in Garmisch-Partenkirchen, West Germany; 1970 European Championships in Leningrad, Soviet Union; and 1971 European Championships in Zürich, Switzerland. They competed at three World Championships; their best result, 12th, came in 1970 (Ljubljana, Yugoslavia). They won two Hungarian national titles.

Sugár served as an ice dancing judge at the 1984 Winter Olympics in Sarajevo, Yugoslavia; 1988 Winter Olympics in Calgary, Alberta, Canada; 1992 Winter Olympics in Albertville, France; and at other competitions into the following century. He has also worked as an ISU referee for ice dancing.

== Competitive highlights ==
With Berecz

International
Event	64–65	65–66	66–67	67–68	68–69	69–70	70–71
World Champ.					13th	12th	15th
European Champ.		16th	15th	12th	8th	8th	10th
Blue Swords					3rd		
Prague Skate	11th						
National
Hungarian Champ.	3rd	2nd	2nd	2nd	2nd	1st	1st
