= Helen M. McLoraine =

American philanthropist (1918–2003)

Helen Myers McLoraine (1918–2003) was the founder of The Pioneer Fund, a philanthropic organization "with a focus on figure skating, higher education assistance and medical research". She was a private investor in the gas and oil industry since the 1950s and became an early female figure in business leadership. After its establishment in the 1960s, she maintained The Pioneer Fund through her own estate and from private donations.

The Helen M. McLoraine Figure Skating Scholarship Program provides $150,000 per year in undergraduate university scholarships to students who have competed in a USFS qualifying competition. Olympic medalist Scott Hamilton was a benefactor of The Pioneer Fund's support of figure skating and currently serves on its board of directors.

Ongoing scholarships have been funded at Regis University, The Denver Foundation, and Girls Inc. In addition, The Pioneer Fund supports the Helen McLoraine Developmental Chair in Neurobiology at the Salk Institute and has provided continued research and postdoctoral grants. According to IRS returns, The Pioneer Fund provided $8.3 million in donations in 2009.

== Significant contributions ==
- Multiple Myeloma Research Consortium ($1.5 million)
- Brain Research Foundation ($1.5 million) for atypical dementia research at the University of Chicago
- International Rett Syndrome Foundation ($1 million matching gift)
- Michael J. Fox Foundation for Parkinson's Research gift to make possible a $2 million research grant for the Clinical Discovery Program
- University of Colorado ($1 million) to establish the Pre-Collegiate Pioneer Fund Scholarship Program
- Scott Hamilton Cancer Alliance for Research, Education and Survivorship at the Taussig Cancer Center of the Cleveland Clinic ($5 million from McLoraine's will)
- Pituitary Network Association
- Urban Peak ($3.9 million) Endowment Fund for outreach and comprehensive support services for homeless youth in Denver
