= Scott Hamilton (figure skater) =

American figure skater

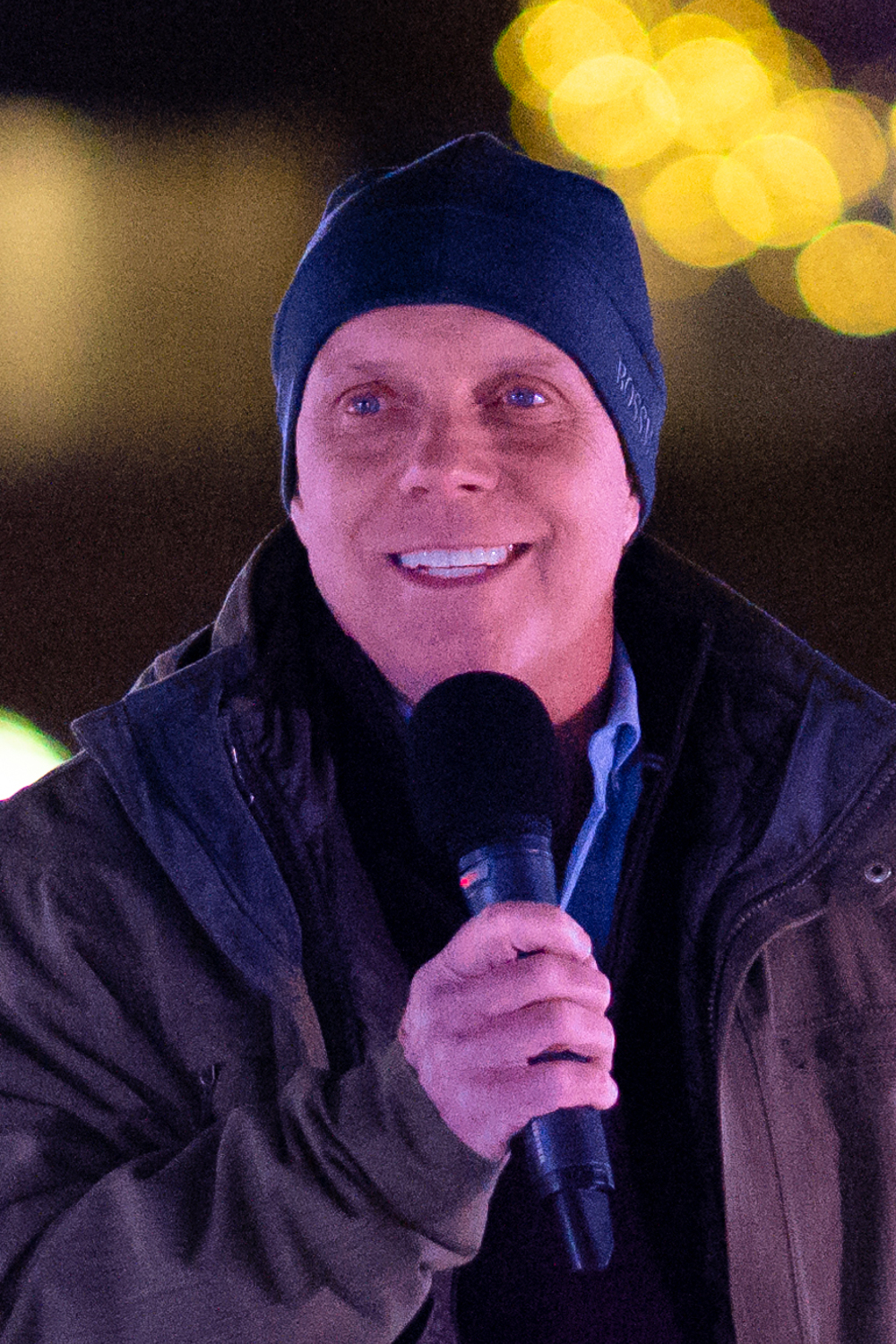
- Hamilton in 2022

Personal information
- Born: Scott Scovell Hamilton; August 28, 1958 (age 68) Toledo, Ohio, U.S.
- Height: 5 ft 4 in (163 cm)
- Spouse: Tracie Robinson (m. 2002)

Figure skating career
- Country: United States
- Discipline: Men's singles
- Skating club: Philadelphia SC & HS
- Began skating: Age 9
- Retired: 2009
Medal record
Olympic Games
Gold medal – first place	1984 Sarajevo	Men's singles
World Championships
Gold medal – first place	1981 Hartford	Men's singles
Gold medal – first place	1982 Copenhagen	Men's singles
Gold medal – first place	1983 Helsinki	Men's singles
Gold medal – first place	1984 Ottawa	Men's singles

Scott Scovell Hamilton (born August 28, 1958) is a retired American figure skater and Olympic gold medalist. He won a gold medal in the 1984 Winter Olympics, four consecutive World Championships (1981–84) and four consecutive U.S. championships (1981–84). His signature move, the backflip, a feat few other figure skaters could perform at the time, was against U.S. Figure Skating and Olympic competition rules at the time. Yet, he would include it in his exhibition routines as an amateur to please the crowd. Later, he also used the backflip in his professional competition routines. He is widely recognized for his innovative footwork sequences. In retirement, he has served as an Olympic analyst, been involved in charitable work, and is the author of three books.

== Early life and education ==
Hamilton was born on August 28, 1958, in Toledo, Ohio. He was adopted at the age of six weeks by Dorothy (née McIntosh), a professor, and Ernest S. Hamilton, a professor of biology, and raised in Bowling Green, Ohio. He has two siblings, older sister Susan (his parents' biological daughter) and younger brother Steven (who was also adopted). He attended Kenwood Elementary School. When Hamilton was two years old, he contracted a mysterious illness that caused him to stop growing. After numerous tests and several wrong diagnoses (including a diagnosis of cystic fibrosis that gave him just six months to live), the disease began to correct itself. His family physician sent him to Boston Children's Hospital for further investigation. Staff at the hospital were also unable to pinpoint the cause, but advised Hamilton that he should avoid dieting to ensure that he would live a normal life. Years later, it was determined that a congenital brain tumor was the root cause of his childhood illness. At the peak of his amateur career Hamilton weighed 108 pounds (49 kg) and was 5 feet 2.5 inches (1.59 m) tall, but eventually grew to a height of 5 feet 4 inches (1.63 m).

At age 13, Hamilton began training with Pierre Brunet, a former Olympic champion. In 1976, however, he was almost forced to quit skating because the cost of training was too high and he enrolled in college. However, Helen and Frank McLoraine stepped in to provide financial support for Hamilton to continue his training. Hamilton would later work with the McLoraines in continuing philanthropic support for figure skating. Hamilton's mother died of breast cancer in 1977 when he was 18 years old. Hamilton attended Bowling Green State University in Ohio. The former First Street in Bowling Green was named Scott Hamilton Avenue in his honor.

== Skating career ==
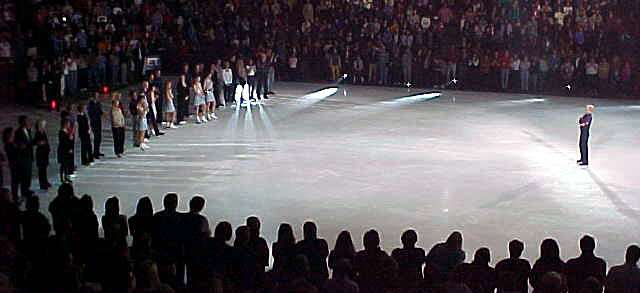
Hamilton's final performance on the Stars on Ice tour

In 1980, Hamilton finished third in the U.S. Figure Skating Championships, earning him a place on the U.S. Olympic team. At this time, Don Laws was coaching him. He finished in fifth place at the 1980 Winter Olympics, where he also had the honor of carrying the American flag in the opening ceremony. His breakthrough performance was in the 1981 U.S. Championships. He performed flawlessly and the audience began a standing ovation several seconds before the end of the performance. He never lost an amateur competition again. In 1981 he won gold in the World Figure Skating Championships. During the long program, he received scores of 5.8s and 5.9s for technical merit and 5.7s at 5.9s for artistic impression out of a perfect score of 6.0. He started the long program off with a triple Lutz jump, his most consistent and hardest jump. He performed a strong program in spite of a minor flub. He won gold again in 1982 and 1983 at the U.S. and World Championships.

At the 1984 Olympics, he won the compulsory figures and placed second in the short program. For the long program, he planned five jumps: a triple Lutz, a triple flip, a triple toe loop in combination with a double loop, a triple toe walley and a triple Salchow. He completed only three of them, missing the triple flip and the triple Salchow. For technical merit, the nine judges gave him three 5.6's, two 5.7's, three 5.8's and a 5.9. For artistic impression, he received four 5.8's and five 5.9's. Brian Orser won the long program and Hamilton was second, but Hamilton won the gold medal because Orser was too far back in the overall standings to catch Hamilton after placing 7th in the compulsory figures, which at the time accounted for 30% of the total score. Hamilton's victory ended a 24-year gold medal drought for US men in Olympic figure skating. He did not attempt the triple Axel jump, a more difficult jump which other skaters in the competition landed. He won that year's World Championships and then turned professional in April 1984.

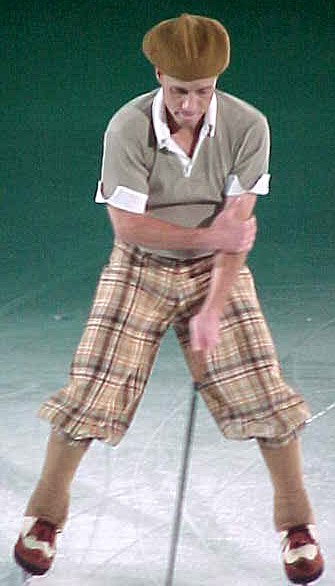
Hamilton performs during a Stars on Ice show

Figure skating writer and historian Ellyn Kestnbaum, in her critique of male figure skating, called the costumes Hamilton wore during the 1984 Olympics an attempt to mitigate the "erotic affect" of the one-piece, disco-influenced outfits popular with many male skaters at the time. She described Hamilton's costumes as "simple stretch suits in one color ornamated only by a simple geometic shape in a contasting color", which resembled a warm-up or speed skating suit that emphasized the "acceptable male sport aspect" of figure skating.

After turning professional, Hamilton toured with the Ice Capades for two years, and then created "Scott Hamilton's American Tour," which later was renamed Stars on Ice. He co-founded, co-produced and performed in Stars on Ice for 15 years before retiring from the tour in 2001 (though he still returns for occasional guest performances).

As a professional, Hamilton often performed his signature backflip, a movement that, until 2024, was prohibited by the International Skating Union (ISU), the organization that governs figure skating. Kestnbaum states that it was "an acknowledgement of the illegality of the move" to the ISU.

He has been awarded numerous skating honors, including being the first solo male figure skater to be awarded the Jacques Favart Award (in 1988). In 1990 he was inducted into the United States Olympic Hall of Fame.

== Career in media ==
=== Broadcasting career ===
Hamilton was a skating commentator for CBS television for many years, beginning in 1985. He has also worked for NBC television as an Olympic figure skating analyst from 2002-2018. In 2006 he was the host of the FOX television program Skating with Celebrities. He currently serves on the board of directors for Special Olympics International.

=== Television appearances ===
Hamilton appeared as a celebrity guest on The $100,000 Pyramid for a week's worth of episodes that aired in March 1991.

Hamilton voiced the dog dancing commentator on the King of the Hill episode "Dances with Dogs". He was also seen in the 2008 The Fairly OddParents episode "The Fairy Oddlympics" as Timmy Turner's co-host.

He appeared on the August 26, 2008 episode of Wanna Bet?, where he finished 2nd, losing to Bill Engvall. In 2009, he appeared in the second season of Celebrity Apprentice.

He made a small appearance on Roseanne as himself, participating in a mock linoleum skating competition credit sequence. He also made a brief appearance in the film Blades of Glory.

On March 8, 2010, Scott Hamilton: Return to the Ice premiered on the Bio Channel. The two-hour television special chronicled Hamilton's return to skating after suffering from cancer.

=== Book authorship ===
In 1999, Hamilton wrote the book Landing It, in which he talks about his life on and off the ice. In 2009, Hamilton wrote the book The Great Eight, which shared the secrets to his happiness and how he overcame numerous challenges and disappointments throughout his life. In 2018, he wrote the book Finish First: Winning Changes Everything (publisher: Thomas Nelson), about the value of competition.

== Personal life ==
=== Family ===
On November 14, 2002, he married Tracie Robinson, a nutritionist. The couple welcomed their first son in 2003 and a second son in 2008. Later in 2013, the couple adopted two orphaned siblings from Haiti. The family resides in Franklin, Tennessee.

=== Faith ===
Hamilton is a Christian and was baptized in 2003. He has said about his faith, "I understand that through a strong relationship with Jesus you can endure anything. ... God was there every single time, every single time."

Hamilton kept his Olympic gold medal in a brown paper bag in his dresser for eight years after receiving it until he donated it to the Figure Skating Hall of Fame Museum. He has said that he felt uneasy with how it inflated his sense of self-worth, "And it wasn't until I came to faith that I understood it could have become an idol."

=== Illnesses ===
In 1997, Hamilton had much-publicized testicular cancer. He was initially concerned that he may have been rendered infertile following his cancer treatment, but later went on to father two children. He made a return to skating after his treatment, and his story was featured in magazines and on television.

In 2004 Hamilton had craniopharyngioma, a benign brain tumor that could cause blindness if not treated. It was treated at the Cleveland Clinic. On June 23, 2010, Hamilton had successful brain surgery to prevent the recurrence of the tumor. In November 2010, Hamilton was in hospital again. During the removal of the tumor, an artery in the brain was "nicked". The bleeding stopped, but an aneurysm formed days later. Hamilton came through the surgery well. In 2016, Hamilton announced that he had received his third brain tumor diagnosis. In late March 2017, he stated that the tumor had shrunk without chemo.

=== Charitable work ===
In 1990, as the Make-A-Wish Foundation honored its 10th birthday, Hamilton was recognized as the Foundation's first ever "Celebrity Wish Granter of the Year."

He founded the Scott Hamilton CARES Foundation to assist with cancer patient support. He has been a longtime volunteer with the Special Olympics and currently serves as a Special Olympics Global Ambassador. Hamilton has also helped benefit St. Jude Children's Research Hospital and the Multiple Myeloma Research Foundation, of which he is an honorary board member.

== Awards and recognition ==
- 1985 – Hamilton was presented the 1984 Most Courageous Athlete Award by the Philadelphia Sports Writers Association.
- 1993 - The Associated Press released results of a national sports study in which Hamilton ranked as one of the top eight most popular athletes in America, ranking far ahead of big-name sports stars such as Michael Jordan, Magic Johnson, Troy Aikman, Dan Marino, Wayne Gretzky, Joe Montana, and Nolan Ryan.
- 1996 - Hamilton was presented the United States Sports Academy's Mildred "Babe" Didrikson Zaharias Courage Award in recognition of his courageous action in overcoming adversity to excel in sport.
- 1996 - Hamilton received the Academy of Achievement Golden Plate Award.
- 2023 - Hamilton received the Kurt Thomas Foundation Flair Award
- 2025 - ISU Skating Awards: Lifetime Achievement Award

== Programs ==
Season	Short program	Free skating	Exhibition
1983–1984		Overture by George Duke; Ren by Hiroshima; Swan Lake by Pyotr Ilyich Tchaikovsky	You Always Hurt the One You Love by Spike Jones; Amazing Grace

== Competition results ==
Event	74–75	75–76	76–77	77–78	78–79	79–80	80–81	81–82	82–83	83–84
Winter Olympics						5th				1st
World Championships				11th		5th	1st	1st	1st	1st
Skate America						1st		1st	1st	
Skate Canada							1st			
NHK Trophy						4th			1st	
Nebelhorn Trophy			2nd							
U.S. Championships	7th J	1st J		3rd	4th	3rd	1st	1st	1st	1st

Olympic Games
Preceded by Gary Hall Sr.	United States Flagbearer; Lake Placid 1980	Succeeded by Frank Masley
