= Elaine Zayak =

American figure skater (born 1965)

Personal information
- Full name: Elaine Kathryn Zayak
- Born: April 4, 1965 (age 61) Paramus, New Jersey, U.S.
- Height: 5 ft 2 in (1.57 m)

Figure skating career
- Country: United States
- Skating club: Skating Club of New York
- Retired: 1984, 1994
Medal record
Ladies' Figure skating
Representing the United States
World Championships
Gold medal – first place	1982 Copenhagen	Ladies' singles
Silver medal – second place	1981 Hartford	Ladies' singles
Bronze medal – third place	1984 Ottawa	Ladies' singles
World Junior Championships
Gold medal – first place	1979 Augsburg	Ladies' singles

Elaine Kathryn Zayak (born April 4, 1965) is an American former figure skater. She is the 1982 World champion and 1981 U.S. national champion. She competed at the 1984 Winter Olympics, placing 6th.

== Personal life ==
Zayak was born and raised in Paramus, New Jersey. At age two, she lost three toes on her left foot as a result of a lawn mower accident. On the advice of her doctors, she began figure skating as physical therapy. Her left boot was stabilized with a wood mold to compensate for the irregularity in the shape of her left foot. Zayak attended Paramus High School and was awarded the Dial Award for the national high-school scholar-athlete of the year in 1982.

== Career ==
Zayak was coached jointly by Peter Burrows and Marylynn Gelderman throughout her amateur and professional career. She won gold at the 1979 World Junior Championships. The next season, she began competing on the senior international level. Zayak stood atop the podium at the 1979 Skate Canada and Prague Skate and then appeared at her first senior World Championships. She was included in the first trip to China by American skaters, in 1980.

Zayak was the first woman to consistently land many triple jumps in her programs. At the 1982 World Championships, she landed six triple jumps to win the title, although four of them were triple toe loops. While she did had triple salchows and loops in her repertoire, they were less consistent. Zayak's skating contributed to the creation of what became informally known as the Zayak rule, enacted at the 1982 ISU Congress, which states that a skater may not perform the same kind of triple jump more than twice, and for it to be given full credit on both occasions, one of the two triples must be incorporated into a combination or sequence. The rule encouraged skaters to display a greater variety of skills.

After her World title in 1982, Zayak's placements suffered from generally poor performances in the then-prevalent compulsory figures (attributed after the fact to her damaged foot). She took the bronze medal at the 1983 U.S. Championships and was sent to the 1983 World Championships. Ranked 11th in the middle of the school figures portion, Zayak abruptly withdrew from the competition with just one more tracing to go and flew back to the United States. She attributed her poor figures to a sore, injured ankle and equipment problems.

Zayak won the bronze medal at the 1984 U.S. Championships. She placed 6th at the 1984 Winter Olympics in Sarajevo and won bronze at the 1984 World Championships. Zayak turned professional later that year and performed with the Ice Capades from 1984 to 1986.

In 1993, Zayak was the only U.S. female singles skater to reinstate to eligible status in an attempt to make the 1994 Olympic team. Including triple jumps she had not performed in a decade, she finished 4th at the 1994 U.S. Championships and was named an alternate for the Olympic Games.

Zayak was inducted into the U.S. Figure Skating Hall of Fame in 2003 and the New Jersey Sports Hall of Fame in 2004. In 2013, she was elected into the National Polish-American Sports Hall of Fame.

Zayak teaches figure skating at the Ice House in Hackensack, New Jersey, and is a spokeswoman for U.S. Figure Skating. Among her current and former students are Joelle Forte and Amelia Xu.

== Competitive highlights ==
International
Event	1978–79	1979–80	1980–81	1981–82	1982–83	1983–84	1993–94
Winter Olympics						6th	
World Champ.		11th	2nd	1st	WD	3rd	
Skate America				2nd			
Skate Canada			1st				
St. Ivel International					1st		
Prague Skate		1st					
International Challenge Cup		2nd		2nd			
Goodwill Games							8th
International: Junior
Junior Worlds	1st						
National
U.S. Championships		4th	1st	3rd	2nd	3rd	4th
WD = Withdrew
