= Paul Martini =

Canadian pair skater

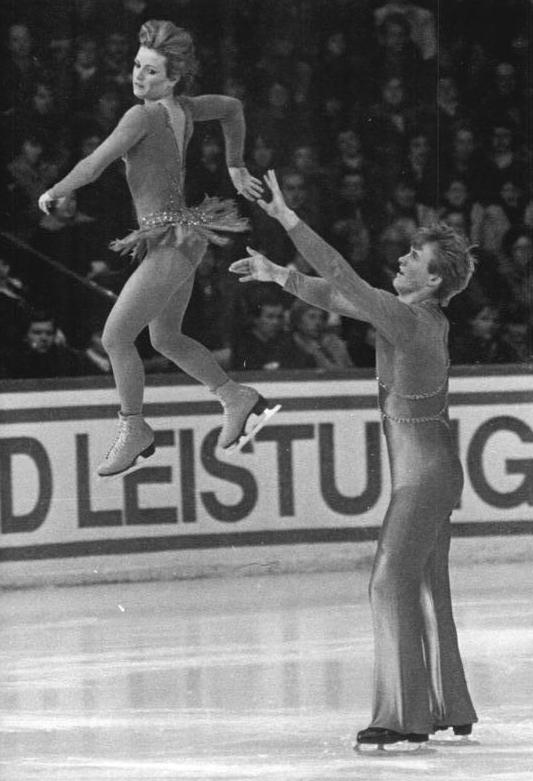
- Barbara Underhill and Paul Martini, 29 March 1983

Personal information
- Full name: Paul Lloyd Martini
- Born: November 2, 1960 (age 65) Weston, Ontario

Figure skating career
- Country: Canada
- Partner: Barbara Underhill
- Skating club: Granite Club; Woodbridge SC
- Retired: April 1998
Medal record
Representing Canada
Pairs' Figure skating
World Championships
Gold medal – first place	1984 Ottawa	Pairs
Bronze medal – third place	1983 Helsinki	Pairs
World Junior Championships
Gold medal – first place	1979 Megève	Pairs

Paul Lloyd Martini (born November 2, 1960) is a Canadian former pair skater. With partner Barbara Underhill, he is the 1979–1983 Canadian national champion, the 1984 World champion, and the 1978 World Junior champion. They represented Canada at the 1980 Winter Olympics, where they placed 9th, and at the 1984 Winter Olympics, where they placed 7th. Less than a month after the 1984 Olympics, they redeemed themselves by winning the World Championship in Ottawa. After that competition, they began a lengthy and successful professional career.

== Competitive highlights ==
(with Underhill)

Event	1977–78	1978–79	1979–80	1980–81	1981–82	1982–83	1983–84
Winter Olympic Games			9th				7th
World Championships		11th	11th	7th	4th	3rd	1st
World Junior Championships	1st						
Canadian Championships	1st J.	1st	1st	1st	1st	1st	
Skate America					1st		
NHK Trophy				1st		1st	
Prize of Moscow News			5th				
Nebelhorn Trophy		1st					
Ennia Challenge Cup		5th			1st		
Coupe des Alpes		1st					
J. = Junior level
