= Judit Péterfy =

Hungarian former ice dancer (born 1960)

Personal information
- Born: 1960s

Figure skating career
- Country: Hungary
- Partner: Csaba Bálint
- Coach: Ilona Berecz
- Retired: c. 1983

Judit Péterfy (born in the 1960s) is a Hungarian former ice dancer. With Csaba Bálint, she is the 1980 World Junior silver medalist and a two-time Hungarian national champion (1982–1983). The duo finished in the top ten at the 1981 European Championships in Innsbruck, Austria; 1982 European Championships in Lyon, France; and 1983 European Championships in Dortmund, West Germany.

Péterfy/Bálint also competed at two World Championships, placing 14th in 1981 (Hartford, Connecticut, United States) and 13th in 1983 (Helsinki, Finland). They were coached by Ilona Berecz.

== Competitive highlights ==
With Bálint

International
Event	77–78	78–79	79–80	80–81	81–82	82–83
World Champ.				14th		13th
European Champ.				10th	8th	10th
Golden Spin of Zagreb						3rd
International: Junior
World Junior Champ.	9th	4th	2nd			
Grand Prize SNP		2nd				
National
Hungarian Champ.					1st	1st
