= Csaba Bálint =

Hungarian ice dancer

Figure skating career
- Country: Hungary
- Partner: Judit Péterfy
- Coach: Ilona Berecz
- Retired: c. 1983

Csaba Bálint is a Hungarian former ice dancer. With Judit Péterfy, he is the 1980 World Junior silver medalist and a two-time Hungarian national champion (1982–1983). The duo finished in the top ten at the 1981 European Championships in Innsbruck, Austria; 1982 European Championships in Lyon, France; and 1983 European Championships in Dortmund, West Germany.

Péterfy/Bálint also competed at two World Championships, placing 14th in 1981 (Hartford, Connecticut, United States) and 13th in 1983 (Helsinki, Finland). They were coached by Ilona Berecz.

Bálint has served as an ISU judge and international referee for ice dancing.

== Competitive highlights ==
With Péterfy

International
Event	77–78	78–79	79–80	80–81	81–82	82–83
World Champ.				14th		13th
European Champ.				10th	8th	10th
Golden Spin of Zagreb						3rd
International: Junior
World Junior Champ.	9th	4th	2nd			
Grand Prize SNP		2nd				
National
Hungarian Champ.					1st	1st
