= Philippe Pélissier =

French figure skater and coach

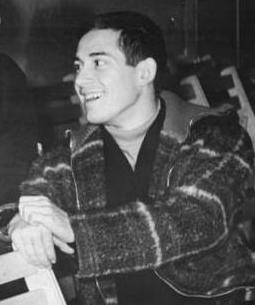
- Pélissier in 1964

Personal information
- Born: 30 November 1947 (age 78) Boulogne-Billancourt, France

Figure skating career
- Country: France
- Retired: c. 1969

Philippe Pélissier (born 30 November 1947) is a French figure skating coach and former competitor. Competing in men's singles, he won six medals at the French Figure Skating Championships. He competed at the 1964 Winter Olympics, placing 23rd, and at the 1968 Winter Olympics, placing 13th. As a coach, he has trained many elite skaters, including Thierry Cerez, Didier Gailhaguet, Jean-Christophe Simond, Stanick Jeannette and Alban Préaubert. Pélissier is known for his expressive reactions behind the boards when his skaters are competing.

He also skated pairs with Micheline Joubert, winning the French national title three times.

== Results ==
=== Men's singles ===
International
| Event | 62–63 | 63–64 | 64–65 | 65–66 | 66–67 | 67–68 | 68–69 |
|---|---|---|---|---|---|---|---|
| Winter Olympics | | 23rd | | | | 13th | |
| World Champ. | | | | | | 12th | 12th |
| European Champ. | 16th | 11th | 9th | | 9th | 9th | 5th |
| Winter Universiade | | | | 3rd | | | |
| Prague Skate | | | | | 6th | | |
National
| French Champ. | 3rd | 3rd | WD | 3rd | 3rd | 2nd | 2nd |
WD = Withdrew

=== Pairs with Joubert ===
National
| Event | 1959–60 | 1960–61 | 1961–62 |
|---|---|---|---|
| French Championships | 1st | 1st | 1st |
