= Line Haddad =

French figure skater

Personal information
- Height: 1.58 m (5 ft 2 in)

Figure skating career
- Country: France; Israel
- Skating club: Skating club of Ny

Line Haddad is a World and Olympic pair skater and was the youngest athlete to compete at the Olympics at Albertville. She is also an international choreographer and a performer with the Ice theatre of Ny company. Former student of Oleg Vassiliev, she is two time French National Champion, one-time Israeli National Champion. As a dancer, she graduated from the Paris Conservatoire in ballet and has also trained and performed in modern dance and Argentine Tango (NY City Center, Google, NY Live Arts, and The Madison Theatre).

== Professional career ==
She is known for her choreographies and work with various world and Olympic skaters, among them are:

- Vanessa James / Morgan Cipres
- Lola Esbrat/ Andrei Novoselov
- Laurine Lecavalier
- Adeline Canac/Maximin Coia
- Marie-pierre Leray/Nicolas Osseland
- Yannick Bonheur
- Taryn Jurgensen

She also coached skaters at ISU Grand Prix events (Skate America, Trophee de France).

After touring with Philippe Candeloro and the French team, she joined the Ice theatre of New York as a Performer and worked with choreographers such as David Parson, Doug Webster, and David Liu. She was also featured in Dance Visions on Ice on NBC starring Nancy Kerrigan and Evgeni Plushenko and well as in a TV show Glee Episode. Academically, she received her Master of Arts in translation and linguistics in Paris, majoring in French, English, and Spanish.

Her most recent choreographies includes Milongon performed at Rockefeller center with Ice dancer Brent Bommentre and composition by world renowned bandoneon player JP Jofre. Line Haddad contemporary piece 11h11 with 6 solo skaters and one couple was also featured at the ITNY home season honoring Evgeni Plushenko and Tai Babilonia and Randy Gardner in Chelsea Piers in October 2017.

== Results ==
=== With Privé for France ===
International
Event	1991–92	1992–93	1993–94	1994–95	1995–96	1996–97	1997–98
Olympics	16th						
Worlds	19th		19th		18th		
Europeans	12th				9th		
CS Skate Canada					6th		
CS Trophée Lalique	9th	6th			9th		
CS Nations Cup					10th		WD
Nebelhorn Trophy				2nd			
National
French Champ.	1st		2nd	2nd	2nd		2nd
CS = Became part of Champions Series in 1995; WD = Withdrew

=== With Lycenko for Israel ===
International
Event	1999–2000
Europeans	18th
Golden Spin of Zagreb	6th
Skate Israel	4th
National
Israeli Champ.	1st
