= Flavien Giniaux =

French pair skater (born 2002)

Personal information
- Born: 25 June 2002 (age 24) Le Chesnay, France
- Home town: Caen, France
- Height: 1.80 m (5 ft 11 in)

Figure skating career
- Country: United Kingdom (since 2026); France (until 2026)
- Discipline: Pair skating (since 2022); Men's singles (2018–20)
- Partner: Zarah Wood (2026–present); Oxana Vouillamoz (2022–24)
- Coach: Bruno Massot; Gaylord Lavoisier
- Skating club: Acsel Caen
- Began skating: 2020

Medal record
French Championships
Silver medal – second place	2023 Rouen	Pairs

Flavien Giniaux (born 25 June 2002) is a French pair skater who currently represents Great Britain. With his current partner, Zarah Wood, he is the 2026 Ice Challenge champion.

With his former partner, Oxana Vouillamoz, he is the 2022 Trophée Métropole Nice Côte d'Azur bronze medalist and placed tenth at the 2022 World Junior Championships.

== Personal life ==
Flavien Giniaux was born on 25 June 2002 in Le Chesnay and resides in Caen, France.

== Career ==
=== Early years ===
Giniaux placed tenth in junior men's singles at the French Junior Championships in February 2020.

He teamed up with Switzerland's Oxana Vouillamoz at the suggestion of Bruno Massot. Coached by Massot, they began skating together in August 2020 at the Tissot Arena in Bienne, Switzerland. Vouillamoz/Giniaux trained but did not compete in their first season together.

=== 2021–22 season ===
By the 2021–22 season, Vouillamoz/Giniaux had relocated with Massot to Caen and had decided to skate for France. The two made their competitive debut in early September, placing tenth at the 2021–22 ISU Junior Grand Prix event in Košice, Slovakia. After winning medals at a few minor international junior events, they won the French junior national title.

In April, Vouillamoz/Giniaux finished tenth at the 2022 World Junior Championships in Tallinn, Estonia.

=== 2022–23 season ===
Beginning their season on the 2022–23 ISU Junior Grand Prix circuit, Vouillamoz/Giniaux placed fifth in the Czech Republic and fourth in Poland. They made their senior international debut in October, winning bronze at the Trophée Métropole Nice Côte d'Azur. They then made their Challenger series debut, finishing eighth at the 2022 CS Warsaw Cup. Vouillamoz/Giniaux won a second consecutive French junior national title, and then took the silver medal at the senior national championships.

At their final junior event, the 2023 World Junior Championships in Calgary, Vouillamoz/Giniaux finished second in the short program, setting a new personal best and winning a silver small medal. Giniaux called the result "amazing. We've worked hard. We have a great team at Caen, with our coach, Oxana, our staff we worked together, and we enjoy every day even if it was hard sometimes." They struggled in the free skate, sixth in that segment and dropping to fifth overall, finishing 5.80 points behind bronze medalists Sierova/Khobta of Ukraine.

Vouillamoz/Giniaux made their senior World Championship debut at the 2023 edition in Saitama. They qualified to the free skate and placed fifteenth overall.

=== 2023–24 season ===
Vouillamoz/Giniaux won gold at the Trophée Métropole Nice, before being invited to make their Grand Prix debut at the 2023 Grand Prix de France. They came seventh.

On December 5, Giniaux announced that Vouillamoz had ended their partnership.

=== 2024-25 season ===
In April, it was announced that Giniaux had teamed up with Canadian Chloe Panetta to compete for France. The partnership didn't last, though, as at the end of June it was announced that Panetta had retired, ending their partnership.

== Programs ==
=== With Vouillamoz ===
Season	Short program	Free skating
2023–2024	Fortitude by Haevn choreo. by Karine Arribert, Pierre-Loup Bouquet	Valhalla Calling by Miracle of Sound choreo. by Karine Arribert, Pierre-Loup Bouquet
2022–2023	Inside by Chris Avantgarde, Red Rosamond arranged by Maxime Rodriguez choreo. by Bruno Massot, Pierre-Loup Bouquet	Between These Hands by Asaf Avidan arranged by Maxime Rodriguez choreo. by Bruno Massot, Pierre-Loup Bouquet
2021–2022	Men Should Never Fall In Love by Grandgeorge arranged by Maxime Rodriguez choreo. by Bruno Massot, Pierre-Loup Bouquet	Between These Hands by Asaf Avidan arranged by Maxime Rodriguez choreo. by Bruno Massot, Pierre-Loup Bouquet

== Competitive highlights ==
GP: Grand Prix; CS: Challenger Series; JGP: Junior Grand Prix

=== Pair skating with Zarah Wood for Great Britain ===
Competition placements at senior level
Season	2026–27
Ice Challenge	1st
Nepela Memorial	2nd
Tayside Trophy	5th

=== Pair skating with Oxana Vouillamoz for France ===
Competition placements at senior level
Season	2022–23	2023–24
World Championships	15th	
French Championships	2nd	
GP France		7th
CS Nebelhorn Trophy		WD
CS Warsaw Cup	8th	
Master's de Patinage		3rd
Trophée Métropole Nice	3rd	1st

Competition placements at junior level
Season	2022–23	2023–24
World Junior Championships	10th	5th
French Championships	1st	1st
JGP Czech Republic		5th
JGP Poland		4th
JGP Slovakia	10th	
Ice Challenge	1st	
Master's de Patinage	1st	1st
Trophée Métropole Nice	1st	
Winter Star	3rd	

=== Single skating ===
International: Junior
Event	18–19	19–20
Volvo Open Cup	11th	
National
French Champ.		10th J
J = Junior

== Detailed results ==
=== Pair skating with Wood ===
Results in the 2026–27 season
Date	Event	SP		FS		Total	
Date	Event	P	Score	P	Score	P	Score
Sep 24–27, 2026	(Slovakia) 2026 Nepela Memorial	2	50.63	2	84.54	2	136.17
Oct 10–11, 2026	(United Kingdom) 2026 Tayside Trophy	4	55.25	4	93.65	5	148.90
Nov 5–8, 2026	(Austria) 2026 Ice Challenge	2	50.85	1	96.04	1	146.89
