= French Figure Skating Championships =

Recurring national figure skating competition

- Status: Active
- Genre: National championships
- Frequency: Annual
- Country: France
- Inaugurated: 1908
- Organizer: French Federation of Ice Sports

The French Figure Skating Championships (French: Championnats de France de patinage artistique) are an annual figure skating competition organized by the French Federation of Ice Sports (French: Fédération Française des Sports de Glace) to crown the national champions of France. The first official French Championships were held in 1908 in Chamonix. The competition, exclusively for men, consisted of special figures and free skating; Louis Magnus was the winner. A competition for women was added the next year, pair skating was added in 1911, and ice dance in 1948. The championships were interrupted during both World War I and World War II.

Medals are awarded in men's singles, women's singles, pair skating, and ice dance at the senior and junior levels, although not every discipline may be held every year due to a lack of participants. Alain Giletti currently holds the record for winning the most French Championship titles in men's singles (with ten), while Andrée Brunet (née Joly) holds the record in women's singles (also with ten). Andrée Brunet also holds the record in pair skating with her husband Pierre Brunet (with eleven), while Jean-Paul Guhel holds the record in ice dance (with nine), although these were not all won with the same partner.

== History ==
Ice skating was first popularized in France during the mid-19th century, when the French could often be seen skating along the canals of Versailles, the Glacière de Gentilly, the Lac d'Enghien, the Ourcq Canal, the ponds of Villette, and the lakes at the Bois de Boulogne. The first skating club in Paris, the Cercle des patineurs, was founded in 1865, and the first artificial ice rink, the Pôle Nord on the Avenue de Clichy, in 1892. France's second ice rink, the Palais de Glace, was constructed from 1893 to 1894 along the Champs-Élysées in Paris, and allowed for figure skating, speed skating, and ice hockey. The French Federation of Ice Sports (French: Fédération Française des Sports de Glace) – originally known as the Union des Fédérations Françaises des Sports de Glace – was founded in 1903 to oversee all winter sports in France except for skiing. In 1908, the organization was renamed the Fédération Française des Sports d'Hiver, and it oversaw figure skating, ice dance, speed skating, bobsleigh, curling, and ice hockey. The first official figure skating championship event for men was held in 1908 in Chamonix. It featured special figures and free skating; Louis Magnus was the winner. A separate event for women was held the next year in Paris; Yvonne Lacroix won the event. Championships in pair skating debuted in 1911, and ice dance in 1948.

No competitions were held from 1915 to 1919 due to World War I, nor from 1940 to 1941 and from 1943 to 1945 owing to the German occupation of France during World War II. After the liberation of France in 1945, championships returned, and have since been held without interruption. The 2021 French Championships, originally scheduled to be held in December 2020, were at first cancelled due to the COVID-19 pandemic, but were later reinstated and held in February 2021 in Vaujany.

== Senior medalists ==
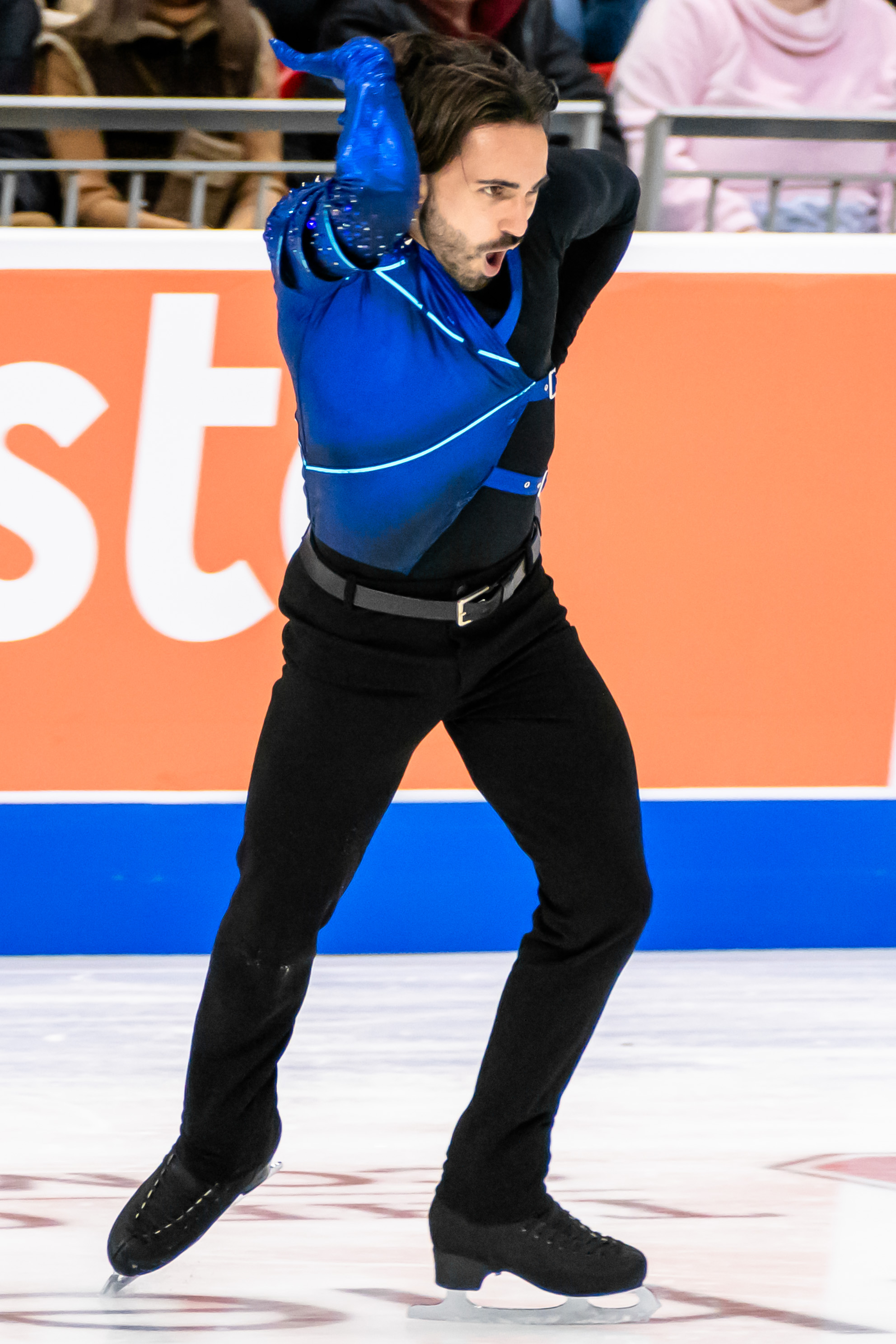
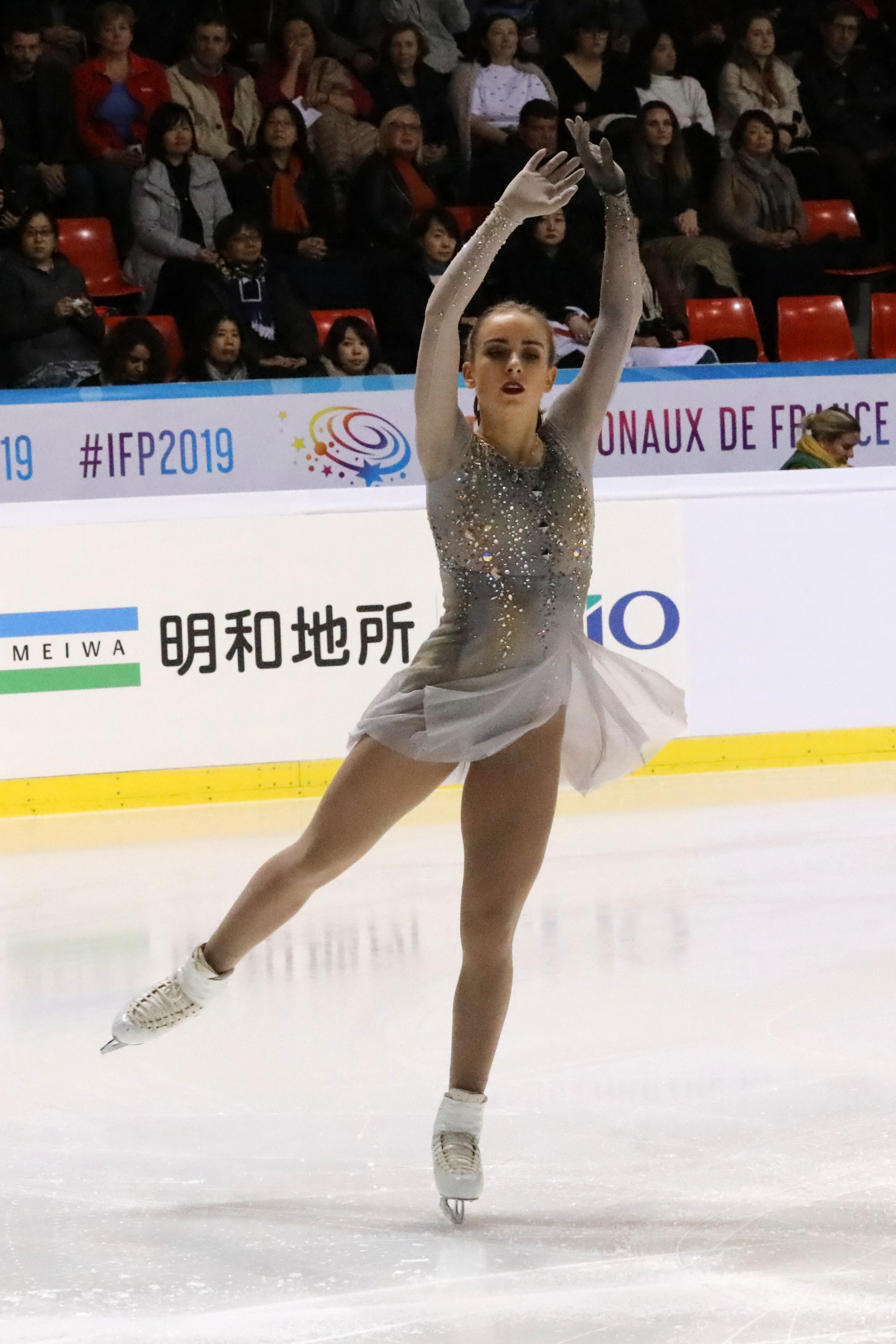
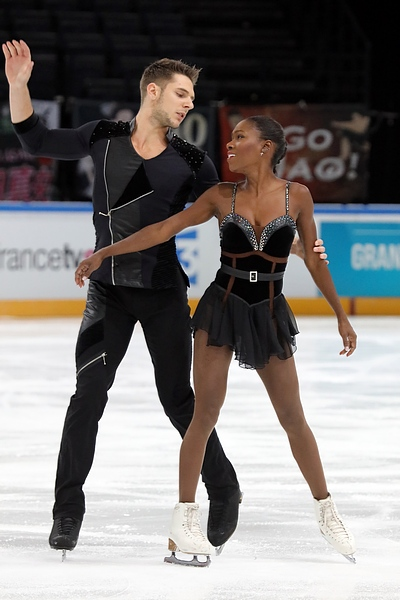
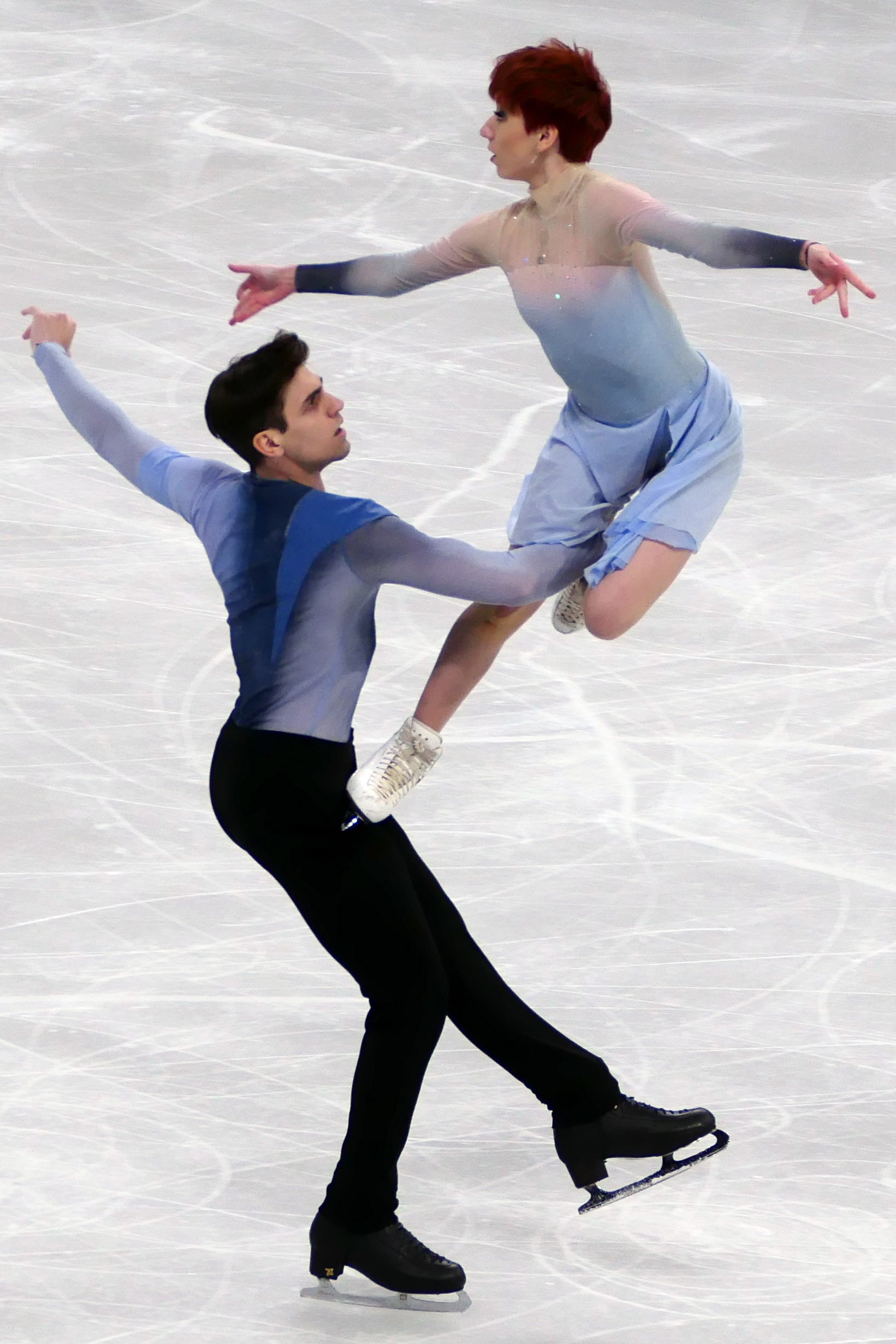
From left to right: Kévin Aymoz, seven-time French champion in men's singles; Léa Serna, three-time French champion in women's singles; Vanessa James and Morgan Ciprès, six-time French champions in pair skating; and Evgeniia Lopareva and Geoffrey Brissaud, three-time French champions in ice dance

=== Men's singles ===
Senior men's event medalists
Year	Location	Gold	Silver	Bronze	Ref.
1908	Chamonix	Louis Magnus	M. Lacroix	Charles Sabouret	
1909	Chamonix	Louis Magnus	M. Marcilly-Saint-Mars	Lucien Trugard	
1910	Paris	Louis Magnus	Francis Pigueron	Lucien Trugard	
1911	Paris	Louis Magnus	Francis Pigueron	Albert Heidé	
1912	Paris	Lucien Trugard	Francis Pigueron	Charles Sabouret	
1913	Paris	Francis Pigueron	Lucien Trugard	André Malinet	
1914	Paris	José Carvajal	(United Kingdom) Basil Williams (Great Britain)	André Malinet	
1915–19	No competitions due to World War I				
1920	Paris	Francis Pigueron	Adolphe Dinesmann	André Malinet	
1921	Font-Romeu	Francis Pigueron	Pierre Brunet	Charles Sabouret	
1922	Paris	Francis Pigueron	Pierre Brunet	Adolphe Dinesmann	
1923	Chamonix	Francis Pigueron	Pierre Brunet	Adolphe Dinesmann	
1924	Paris	Pierre Brunet	Georges Torchon	No other competitors	
1925	Paris	Pierre Brunet	Louis Barbey	Stéphane Rodriguès-Henriquès	
1926	Paris	Pierre Brunet (Note: Pierre Brunet did not achieve the minimum required score to be named the French champion.)	Louis Barbey	No other competitors	
1927	Paris	Pierre Brunet	Jean Henrion	Georges Torchon	
1928	Paris	Pierre Brunet	Louis Barbey	Georges Torchon	
1929	Chamonix	Pierre Brunet	Charles Sabouret	No other competitors	
1930	Mont Revard	Pierre Brunet	Jean Henrion	Stéphane Rodriguès-Henriquès	
1931	Font-Romeu	Pierre Brunet	Georges Torchon	Stéphane Rodriguès-Henriquès	
1932	Paris	Jean Henrion	Pierre Brunet	Georges Torchon	
1933	Paris	Jean Henrion	Georges Torchon	Gérard Rodriguès-Henriquès	
1934	Chamonix	Jean Henrion	Gérard Rodriguès-Henriquès	No other competitors	
1935	Paris	Jean Henrion	Jacques Favart	No other competitors	
1936	Paris	Jean Henrion	Jacques Favart	Gérard Rodriguès-Henriquès	
1937	Paris	Jean Henrion	Jacques Favart	No other competitors	
1938	Paris	Jean Henrion	Jacques Favart	No other competitors	
1939	Paris	Jean Henrion	Jacques Favart	Tony Font	
1940–41	No competitions due to World War II				
1942	Paris	Jacques Favart	Guy Pigier	Paul Gaudin	
1943–45	No competitions due to World War II				
1946	Paris	Paul Gaudin	Tony Font	Guy Pigier	
1947	Paris	Guy Pigier	Tony Font	Jean Vivès	
1948	Paris	No men's competitors			
1949	Paris	Tony Font	Jean Vivès	No other competitors	
1950	Paris	Tony Font	Jean Vivès	No other competitors	
1951	Paris	Alain Giletti	Jean Vivès	No other competitors	
1952	Paris	Alain Giletti	Jean Vivès	No other competitors	
1953	Paris	Alain Giletti	Jean Vivès	No other competitors	
1954	Paris	Alain Giletti	Alain Calmat	No other competitors	
1955	Lyon	Alain Giletti	Alain Calmat	No other competitors	
1956	Boulogne-Billancourt	Alain Giletti	Alain Calmat	No other competitors	
1957	Boulogne-Billancourt	Alain Giletti	Alain Calmat	No other competitors	
1958	Paris	Alain Calmat	Alain Giletti	No other competitors	
1959	Boulogne-Billancourt	Alain Giletti	Alain Calmat	No other competitors	
1960	Boulogne-Billancourt	Alain Giletti	Alain Calmat	No other competitors	
1961	Boulogne-Billancourt	Alain Giletti	Alain Calmat	Robert Dureville	
1962	Boulogne-Billancourt	Alain Calmat	Robert Dureville	Alain Trouillet	
1963	Boulogne-Billancourt	Alain Calmat	Robert Dureville	Philippe Pélissier	
1964	Boulogne-Billancourt	Alain Calmat	Robert Dureville	Philippe Pélissier	
1965	Boulogne-Billancourt	Alain Calmat	Robert Dureville	Patrick Péra	
1966	Boulogne-Billancourt	Patrick Péra	Robert Dureville	Philippe Pélissier	
1967	Boulogne-Billancourt	Patrick Péra	Robert Dureville	Philippe Pélissier	
1968	Lyon	Patrick Péra	Philippe Pélissier	Jacques Mrozek	
1969	Boulogne-Billancourt	Patrick Péra	Philippe Pélissier	Jacques Mrozek	
1970	Boulogne-Billancourt	Patrick Péra	Jacques Mrozek	Didier Gailhaguet	
1971	Megève	Patrick Péra	Jacques Mrozek	Didier Gailhaguet	
1972	Chamonix	Patrick Péra	Didier Gailhaguet	Willy Bargauan	
1973	Strasbourg	Jacques Mrozek	Pascal Delorme	Christophe Boyadjian	
1974	Boulogne-Billancourt	Didier Gailhaguet	Pascal Delorme	Gilles Beyer	
1975	Reims	Didier Gailhaguet	Gilles Beyer	Jean-Christophe Simond	
1976	Asnières-sur-Seine	Jean-Christophe Simond	Gilles Beyer	Christophe Boyadjian	
1977	Amiens	Jean-Christophe Simond	Pierre Lamine	Gilles Beyer	
1978	Belfort	Gilles Beyer	Michel Lotz	Christophe Boyadjian	
1979	Tours	Jean-Christophe Simond	Michel Lotz	Patrice Macrez	
1980	Reims	Jean-Christophe Simond	Patrice Macrez	Gilles Beyer	
1981	Anglet	Jean-Christophe Simond	Patrice Macrez	Didier Monge	
1982	Asnières-sur-Seine	Jean-Christophe Simond	Philippe Paulet	Didier Monge	
1983	Bordeaux	Jean-Christophe Simond	Laurent Depouilly	Fernand Fédronic	
1984	Megève	Jean-Christophe Simond	Laurent Depouilly	Fernand Fédronic	
1985	Belfort	Fernand Fédronic	Philippe Roncoli	Laurent Depouilly	
1986	Franconville	Laurent Depouilly	Philippe Roncoli	Frédéric Harpagès	
1987	Épinal	Philippe Roncoli	Frédéric Harpagès	Fernand Fédronic	
1988	Grenoble	Frédéric Lipka	Axel Médéric	Fernand Fédronic	
1989	Caen	Axel Médéric	Éric Millot	Nicolas Pétorin	
1990	Annecy	Éric Millot	Philippe Candeloro	Frédéric Harpagès	
1991	Reims	Éric Millot	Philippe Candeloro	Nicolas Pétorin	
1992	Colombes	Éric Millot	Nicolas Pétorin	Philippe Candeloro	
1993	Grenoble	Éric Millot	Philippe Candeloro	Nicolas Pétorin	
1994	Athis-Mons	Philippe Candeloro	Éric Millot	Thierry Cérez	
1995	Bordeaux	Philippe Candeloro	Éric Millot	Thierry Cérez	
1996	Albertville	Philippe Candeloro	Éric Millot	Thierry Cérez	
1997	Amiens	Philippe Candeloro	Thierry Cérez	Laurent Tobel	
1998	Besançon	Thierry Cérez	Laurent Tobel	Gabriel Monnier	
1999	Lyon	Laurent Tobel	Vincent Restencourt	Thierry Cérez	
2000	Courchevel	Stanick Jeannette	Gabriel Monnier	Vincent Restencourt	
2001	Briançon	Stanick Jeannette	Frédéric Dambier	Vincent Restencourt	
2002	Grenoble	Gabriel Monnier	Frédéric Dambier	Brian Joubert	
2003	Asnières-sur-Seine	Brian Joubert	Stanick Jeannette	Frédéric Dambier	
2004	Briançon	Brian Joubert	Frédéric Dambier	Stanick Jeannette	
2005	Rennes	Brian Joubert	Frédéric Dambier	Samuel Contesti	
2006	Besançon	Brian Joubert	Samuel Contesti	Alban Préaubert	
2007	Orléans	Brian Joubert	Yannick Ponsero	Samuel Contesti	
2008	Megève	Brian Joubert	Yannick Ponsero	Alban Préaubert	
2009	Colmar	Yannick Ponsero	Florent Amodio	Alban Préaubert	
2010	Marseille	Florent Amodio	Yannick Ponsero	Alban Préaubert	
2011	Tours	Brian Joubert	Florent Amodio	Alban Préaubert	
2012	Dammarie-lès-Lys	Brian Joubert	Florent Amodio	Chafik Besseghier	
2013	Strasbourg	Florent Amodio	Chafik Besseghier	Romain Ponsart	
2014	Vaujany	Florent Amodio	Brian Joubert	Chafik Besseghier	
2015	Megève	Florent Amodio	Romain Ponsart	Chafik Besseghier	
2016	Épinal	Chafik Besseghier	Florent Amodio	Simon Hocquaux	
2017	Caen	Kévin Aymoz	Chafik Besseghier	Romain Ponsart	
2018	Nantes	Chafik Besseghier	Kévin Aymoz	Romain Ponsart	
2019	Vaujany	Kévin Aymoz	Adam Siao Him Fa	Adrien Tesson	
2020	Dunkirk	Kévin Aymoz	Adam Siao Him Fa	Romain Ponsart	
2021	Vaujany	Kévin Aymoz	Adam Siao Him Fa	Romain Ponsart	
2022	Cergy-Pontoise	Kévin Aymoz	Adam Siao Him Fa	Luc Economides	
2023	Rouen	Adam Siao Him Fa	Kévin Aymoz	François Pitot	
2024	Vaujany	Adam Siao Him Fa	Luc Economides	François Pitot	
2025	Annecy	Kévin Aymoz	François Pitot	Luc Economides	
2026	Briançon	Kévin Aymoz	Adam Siao Him Fa	Luc Economides	

=== Women's singles ===
Senior women's event medalists
Year	Location	Gold	Silver	Bronze	Ref.
1909	Paris	Yvonne Lacroix	Anita Nahmias	No other competitors	
1910	Paris	Anita Nahmias	No other competitors		
1911	Paris	Simone Poujade	No other competitors		
1912	Paris	Anita Del Monte-Nahmias	Simone Poujade	No other competitors	
1913	Paris	Simone Poujade	Anita Del Monte-Nahmias	No other competitors	
1914	Paris	Simone Poujade	Yvonne Bourgeois	No other competitors	
1915–19	No competitions due to World War I				
1920	No women's competitors				
1921	Font-Romeu	Andrée Brunet (née Joly)	Yvonne Bourgeois	Simone Sabouret	
1922	Paris	Andrée Brunet (née Joly)	Yvonne Bourgeois	No other competitors	
1923	Font-Romeu	Andrée Brunet (née Joly)	Yvonne Bourgeois	No other competitors	
1924	Paris	Andrée Brunet (née Joly)	No other competitors		
1925	Paris	Andrée Brunet (née Joly)	Gaby Clericetti (née Barbey)	No other competitors	
1926	Paris	Andrée Brunet (née Joly)	Gaby Clericetti (née Barbey)	Janine Garanger (née Hagenauer)	
1927	Paris	Andrée Brunet (née Joly)	No other competitors		
1928	Paris	Andrée Brunet (née Joly)	Gaby Clericetti (née Barbey)	Janine Garanger (née Hagenauer)	
1929	Chamonix	Andrée Brunet (née Joly)	Jacqueline Brown	Marguerite Bouvier	
1930	Mont Revard	Andrée Brunet (née Joly)	Jacqueline Brown	No other competitors	
1931	Font-Romeu	Gaby Clericetti (née Barbey)	Janine Garanger (née Hagenauer)	Jacqueline Vaudecrane	
1932	Paris	Gaby Clericetti (née Barbey)	Jacqueline Vaudecrane	Pierrette Vivès	
1933	Paris	Gaby Clericetti (née Barbey)	Jacqueline Vaudecrane	Pierrette Vivès	
1934	Chamonix	Gaby Clericetti (née Barbey)	Janine Garanger (née Hagenauer)	Jacqueline Vaudecrane	
1935	Paris	Gaby Clericetti (née Barbey)	Jacqueline Vaudecrane	No other competitors	
1936	Paris	Gaby Clericetti (née Barbey)	Jacqueline Vaudecrane	Mlle Schweigh	
1937	Paris	Jacqueline Vaudecrane	Gaby Clericetti (née Barbey)	Colette Diot	
1938	Paris	Jacqueline Vaudecrane	Gaby Clericetti (née Barbey)	Colette Diot	
1939	Paris	Betty Hendrickx (Belgium) (Note: Jacqueline Vaudecrane was named the 1939 French champion, because Betty Hendrickx, the first-place finisher, was a guest skater from Belgium.)	Jacqueline Vaudecrane	Micheline Lannoy (Belgium)	
1940–41	No competitions due to World War II				
1942	Paris	Denise Fayolle	Denise Gaudin	Claude Martin-Chauffier	
1943–45	No competitions due to World War II				
1946	Paris	Denise Fayolle	Jacqueline du Bief	Janine Lafitte	
1947	Paris	Jacqueline du Bief	Denise Fayolle	Claude Martin-Chauffier	
1948	Paris	Jacqueline du Bief	Liliane Caffin-Madaule	No other competitors	
1949	Paris	Jacqueline du Bief	Colette Laurendeau	No other competitors	
1950	Paris	Jacqueline du Bief	Colette Laurendeau	No other competitors	
1951	Paris	Jacqueline du Bief	Nadine Damien	Josette Arrouet	
1952	Paris	Jacqueline du Bief	Christiane Moreux	Claude Baury	
1953	Paris	Liliane Caffin-Madaule	Christiane Moreux	Nadine Damien	
1954	Paris	Maryvonne Huet	Christiane Moreux	Gilberte Naboudet	
1955	Lyon	Maryvonne Huet	Michèle Allard	Gilberte Naboudet	
1956	Boulogne-Billancourt	Michèle Allard	Dany Rigoulot	Gilberte Naboudet	
1957	Boulogne-Billancourt	Maryvonne Huet	Corinne Altmann	No other competitors	
1958	Boulogne-Billancourt	Dany Rigoulot	Nicole Erdos	Nicole Hassler	
1959	Boulogne-Billancourt	Dany Rigoulot	Nicole Hassler	Corinne Altmann	
1960	Boulogne-Billancourt	Nicole Hassler	Danièle Giraud	No other competitors	
1961	Boulogne-Billancourt	Dany Rigoulot	Nicole Hassler	Danièle Giraud	
1962	Boulogne-Billancourt	Nicole Hassler	Danièle Giraud	Laurence Berjoan	
1963	Boulogne-Billancourt	Nicole Hassler	Micheline Joubert	Geneviève Burdel	
1964	Boulogne-Billancourt	Nicole Hassler	Denise Neanne	Geneviève Burdel	
1965	Boulogne-Billancourt	Nicole Hassler	Sylvaine Duban	Denise Neanne	
1966	Boulogne-Billancourt	Nicole Hassler	Micheline Joubert	Denise Neanne	
1967	Boulogne-Billancourt	Sylvaine Duban	Micheline Joubert	Denise Neanne	
1968	Lyon	Sylvaine Duban	Micheline Joubert	Joëlle Cartaux	
1969	Boulogne-Billancourt	Joëlle Cartaux	Arielle Contamine	Christiane Duchatel	
1970	Boulogne-Billancourt	Joëlle Cartaux	Arielle Contamine	Elisabeth Louesdon	
1971	Megève	Joëlle Cartaux	Marie-Claude Bierre	Marie-Hèlène Panet	
1972	Chamonix	Marie-Claude Bierre	Joëlle Cartaux	Marie-Hèlène Panet	
1973	Strasbourg	Marie-Claude Bierre	Christine Strohl	Dominique Faure	
1974	Boulogne-Billancourt	Marie-Claude Bierre	Marie-Hélène Panet	Sabine Fuchs	
1975	Reims	Marie-Claude Bierre	Sabine Fuchs	Marie-Reine Le Gougne	
1976	Asnières-sur-Seine	Marie-Claude Bierre	Anne-Sophie de Kristoffy	Sylvie Doulat	
1977	Amiens	Marie-Claude Bierre	Anne-Sophie de Kristoffy	Marie-Reine Le Gougne	
1978	Belfort	Anne-Sophie de Kristoffy	Isabelle Deneux	Sophie Bojé	
1979	Tours	Anne-Sophie de Kristoffy	Cécile Antonelli	Véronique Lamarque	
1980	Reims	Anne-Sophie de Kristoffy	Cécile Antonelli	Béatrice Farinacci	
1981	Anglet	Cécile Antonelli	Béatrice Farinacci	Anne-Sophie de Kristoffy	
1982	Asnières-sur-Seine	Béatrice Farinacci	Anne-Sophie de Kristoffy	Sophie Cuissot	
1983	Bordeaux	Agnès Gosselin	Béatrice Farinacci	Sophie Cuissot	
1984	Megève	Agnès Gosselin	Nathalie Duquesne	Sophie Cuissot	
1985	Belfort	Agnès Gosselin	Florence Copp	Nathalie Duquesne	
1986	Franconville	Agnès Gosselin	Florence Copp	Nathalie Duquesne	
1987	Épinal	Agnès Gosselin	Florence Albert	Florence Copp	
1988	Grenoble	Agnès Gosselin	Claude Péri	Sandrine Bache	
1989	Caen	Surya Bonaly	Claude Péri	Sandra Garde	
1990	Annecy	Surya Bonaly	Laëtitia Hubert	Sandra Garde	
1991	Reims	Surya Bonaly	Laëtitia Hubert	Cécile Tribolet	
1992	Colombes	Surya Bonaly	Laëtitia Hubert	Marie-Pierre Leray	
1993	Grenoble	Surya Bonaly	Marie-Pierre Leray	Laëtitia Hubert	
1994	Athis-Mons	Surya Bonaly	Marie-Pierre Leray	Laëtitia Hubert	
1995	Bordeaux	Surya Bonaly	Marie-Pierre Leray	Laëtitia Hubert	
1996	Albertville	Surya Bonaly	Véronique Fleury	Malika Tahir	
1997	Amiens	Surya Bonaly	Vanessa Gusméroli	Gwenaëlle Julien	
1998	Besançon	Laëtitia Hubert	Surya Bonaly	Vanessa Gusméroli	
1999	Lyon	Laëtitia Hubert	Vanessa Gusméroli	Christelle Miro	
2000	Courchevel	Vanessa Gusméroli	Gwenaëlle Julien	Julie Cortial	
2001	Briançon	Vanessa Gusméroli	Laëtitia Hubert	Christelle Miro	
2002	Grenoble	Vanessa Gusméroli	Laëtitia Hubert	Anne-Sophie Calvez	
2003	Asnières-sur-Seine	Candice Didier	Anne-Sophie Calvez	Christelle Miro	
2004	Briançon	Candice Didier	Anne-Sophie Calvez	Gwendoline Didier	
2005	Rennes	Nadège Bobillier	Anne-Sophie Calvez	Laura Dutertre	
2006	Besançon	Nadège Bobillier	Céline Lacour	Laura Dutertre	
2007	Orléans	Anne-Sophie Calvez	Candice Didier	Laura Dutertre	
2008	Megève	Gwendoline Didier	Chloé Dépouilly	Julie Cagnon	
2009	Colmar	Candice Didier	Maé-Bérénice Méité	Sandra Sitbon	
2010	Marseille	Léna Marrocco	Maé-Bérénice Méité	Gwendoline Didier	
2011	Tours	Yrétha Silété	Lénaëlle Gilleron-Gorry	Maé-Bérénice Méité	
2012	Dammarie-lès-Lys	Yrétha Silété	Maé-Bérénice Méité	Anaïs Ventard	
2013	Strasbourg	Anaïs Ventard	Maé-Bérénice Méité	Laurine Lecavelier	
2014	Vaujany	Maé-Bérénice Méité	Laurine Lecavelier	Anaïs Ventard	
2015	Megève	Maé-Bérénice Méité	Laurine Lecavelier	Léa Serna	
2016	Épinal	Maé-Bérénice Méité	Laurine Lecavelier	Alizée Crozet	
2017	Caen	Laurine Lecavelier	Maé-Bérénice Méité	Alizée Crozet	
2018	Nantes	Maé-Bérénice Méité	Laurine Lecavelier	Léa Serna	
2019	Vaujany	Maé-Bérénice Méité	Laurine Lecavelier	Julie Froetscher	
2020	Dunkirk	Maé-Bérénice Méité	Maïa Mazzara	Léa Serna	
2021	Vaujany	Léa Serna	Maïa Mazzara	Lola Ghozali	
2022	Cergy-Pontoise	Léa Serna	Lorine Schild	Lola Ghozali	
2023	Rouen	Léa Serna	Lorine Schild	Maïa Mazzara	
2024	Vaujany	Lorine Schild	Stefania Gladki	Léa Serna	
2025	Annecy	Stefania Gladki	Léa Serna	Ève Dubecq	
2026	Briançon	Stefania Gladki	Lorine Schild	Léa Serna	

=== Pairs ===
Senior pairs event medalists
Year	Location	Gold	Silver	Bronze	Ref.
1911	Paris	Nina Aysaguer; Charles Sabouret	Simone Poujade; Francis Pigueron	Mme Hounsfield; Louis Magnus	
1912	Paris	Anita del Monte; Louis Magnus	Simone Poujade; Francis Pigueron	No other competitors	
1913	Paris	Simone Poujade; Francis Pigueron	Simone Roussel; Charles Sabouret	Mlle de Costa; Louis Magnus	
1914	Paris	Simone Poujade; Francis Pigueron	Yvonne Bourgeois; Robert George	No other competitors	
1915–19	No competitions due to World War I				
1920	Paris	Yvonne Bourgeois; Francis Pigueron	Simone Sabouret; Charles Sabouret	No other competitors	
1921	Font-Romeu	Simone Sabouret; Charles Sabouret	Yvonne Bourgeois; Francis Pigueron	Andrée Brunet (née Joly); Pierre Brunet	
1922	Paris	Yvonne Bourgeois; Francis Pigueron	Simone Sabouret; Charles Sabouret	Andrée Brunet (née Joly); Pierre Brunet	
1923	Paris	Yvonne Bourgeois; Francis Pigueron	Andrée Brunet (née Joly); Pierre Brunet	No other competitors	
1924	Paris	Andrée Brunet (née Joly); Pierre Brunet	Elvire Barbey; Louis Barbey	No other competitors	
1925	Paris	Andrée Brunet (née Joly); Pierre Brunet	Elvire Barbey; Louis Barbey	No other competitors	
1926	Paris	Andrée Brunet (née Joly); Pierre Brunet	Marie-Louise Brunet; M. Theurnyssen	No other competitors	
1927	Paris	Andrée Brunet (née Joly); Pierre Brunet	Elvire Barbey; Louis Barbey	Mlle Leduc; M. Thurneyssen	
1928	Paris	Andrée Brunet (née Joly); Pierre Brunet	Elvire Barbey; Louis Barbey	No other competitors	
1929	Chamonix	Andrée Brunet (née Joly); Pierre Brunet	Marguerite Bouvier; Charles Sabouret	No other competitors	
1930	Mont Revard	Andrée Brunet (née Joly); Pierre Brunet	Elvire Barbey; Louis Barbey	Marguerite Bouvier; Charles Sabouret	
1931	Font-Romeu	Andrée Brunet (née Joly); Pierre Brunet	Elvire Barbey; Louis Barbey	Lucienne Bonne; Charles Sabouret	
1932	Paris	Andrée Brunet (née Joly); Pierre Brunet	Elvire Barbey; Louis Barbey	Mme Rodriguès; M. Rodriguès	
1933	Paris	Andrée Brunet (née Joly); Pierre Brunet	Elvire Barbey; Louis Barbey	No other competitors	
1934	Paris	Elvire Barbey; Louis Barbey	Gaby Clericetti; Jean Henrion	Mme Rodriguès; M. Rodriguès	
1935	Paris	Andrée Brunet (née Joly); Pierre Brunet	Gaby Clericetti; Jean Henrion	Elvire Barbey; Louis Barbey	
1936	Paris	Elvire Barbey; Louis Barbey	Thérèse Blum; Charles Sabouret	Simone Raquet; Jacques Favart	
1937	Paris	Suzy Boulesteix; Jean Henrion	Simone Raquet; Jacques Favart	Elvire Barbey; Louis Barbey	
1938	Paris	Suzy Boulesteix; Jean Henrion	Simone Raquet; Jacques Favart	No other competitors	
1939	Paris	Soumi Sakomoto; Guy Pigier	Thérèse Blum; Charles Sabouret	No other competitors	
1940–41	No competitions due to World War II				
1942	Paris	Denise Fayolle; Guy Pigier	Claude Martin-Chauffier; Jacques Favart	Mme Coudray; M. Lormet	
1943–45	No competitions due to World War II				
1946	Paris	Denise Favart; Jacques Favart	No other competitors		
1947	Paris	Denise Favart; Jacques Favart	Denise Fayolle; Guy Pigier	No other competitors	
1948	Paris	Denise Favart; Jacques Favart	No other competitors		
1949	Paris	Denise Favart; Jacques Favart	Janine Lafitte; Jean Vivès	No other competitors	
1950	Paris	Denise Favart; Jacques Favart	Mlle Daury; M. Benier	No other competitors	
1951	Paris	Jacqueline du Bief; Tony Font	Josette Arrouet; Thierry Tardy	No other competitors	
1952	Paris	Jacqueline du Bief; Tony Font	No other competitors		
1953	Paris	Nadine Damien; Jean Vivès	Chantal d'Orfond; J.P. Levy	No other competitors	
1954	Paris	Colette Tarozzi; Jean Vivès	No other competitors		
1955	Lyon	No pairs competitors			
1956	Boulogne-Billancourt	Michèle Allard; Alain Giletti	Colette Tarozzi; Jean Vivès	No other competitors	
1957	Boulogne-Billancourt	Colette Tarozzi; Jean Vivès	No other competitors		
1958	Boulogne-Billancourt	Anny Hirsch; Jean Vivès	No other competitors		
1959	Boulogne-Billancourt	Anny Hirsch; Jean Vivès	No other competitors		
1960	Boulogne-Billancourt	Micheline Joubert; Philippe Pélissier	No other competitors		
1961	Boulogne-Billancourt	Micheline Joubert; Philippe Pélissier	No other competitors		
1962	Boulogne-Billancourt	Micheline Joubert; Philippe Pélissier	No other competitors		
1963	Boulogne-Billancourt	No pairs competitors			
1964	Boulogne-Billancourt	Micheline Joubert; Alain Trouillet	Noëlle Santerne; Yvan Le Théry	No other competitors	
1965	Boulogne-Billancourt	Noëlle Santerne; Yvan Le Théry	No other competitors		
1966	Boulogne-Billancourt	Noëlle Santerne; Yvan Le Théry	Anny Hirsch; Jean Vivès	No other competitors	
1967	Boulogne-Billancourt	Fabienne Etlensperger; Jean-Roland Racle	Noëlle Santerne; Yvan Le Théry	No other competitors	
1968	Lyon	Fabienne Etlensperger; Jean-Roland Racle	Florence Cahn; Jean-Pierre Rondel	Chantal Malderez; Gérard Malderez	
1969	Boulogne-Billancourt	Mona Szabo; Pierre Szabo	Florence Cahn; Jean-Pierre Rondel	Chantal Malderez; Gérard Malderez	
1970	Boulogne-Billancourt	Mona Szabo; Pierre Szabo	No other competitors		
1971	Megève	Florence Cahn; Jean-Roland Racle	Pascale Kovelmann; Jean-Pierre Rondel	No other competitors	
1972	Chamonix	Florence Cahn; Jean-Roland Racle	Pascale Kovelmann; Jean-Pierre Rondel	No other competitors	
1973	Strasbourg	Florence Cahn; Jean-Roland Racle	Pascale Kovelmann; Jean-Pierre Rondel	No other competitors	
1974	Boulogne-Billancourt	Florence Cahn; Jean-Roland Racle	Pascale Kovelmann; Jean-Pierre Rondel	Catherine Brunet; Philippe Brunet	
1975	Reims	Pascale Kovelmann; Jean-Roland Racle	Véronique Levan; Philippe Ramon	No other competitors	
1976	Asnières-sur-Seine	Caroline Verchère; Jean-Pierre Rondel	Sabine Fuchs; Xavier Videau	Catherine Brunet; Philippe Brunet	
1977	Amiens	Sabine Fuchs; Xavier Videau	Catherine Brunet; Philippe Brunet	Véronique Levan; Philippe Ramon	
1978	Belfort	Sabine Fuchs; Xavier Videau	Catherine Brunet; Philippe Brunet	No other competitors	
1979	Tours	Sabine Fuchs; Xavier Videau	Catherine Brunet; Philippe Brunet	No other competitors	
1980	Reims	Hélène Glabek; Xavier Videau	Katia Dubec; Xavier Douillard	Catherine Brunet; Philippe Brunet	
1981	Anglet	Nathalie Tortel; Xavier Videau	Nathalie Borini; Gilles Chauvet	Catherine Brunet; Philippe Brunet	
1982	Asnières-sur-Seine	Nathalie Tortel; Xavier Videau	Cathy Gallière; Lionel Delieutraz	No other competitors	
1983	Bordeaux	Nathalie Tortel; Xavier Douillard	Cathy Gallière; Lionel Delieutraz	No other competitors	
1984	Megève	Sylvie Vaquero; Didier Manaud	Christine Plisson; Gilles Chauvet	No other competitors	
1985	Belfort	Sylvie Vaquero; Didier Manaud	Astrid Cordeau; Guy Renault	No other competitors	
1986	Franconville	Sylvie Vaquero; Didier Manaud	Christine Plisson; Gilles Chauvet	Céline Cloix; Nicolas Desquenne	
1987	Épinal	Charline Mauger; Benoît Vandenberghe	Sylvie Vaquero; Didier Manaud	Christine Plisson; Gilles Chauvet	
1988	Grenoble	Valérie Binsse; Jean-Christophe Mbonyinshuti	No other competitors		
1989	Caen	Surya Bonaly; Benoît Vandenberghe	Valérie Binsse; Jean-Christophe Mbonyinshuti	No other competitors	
1990–91	No pairs competitors				
1992	Colombes	Line Haddad; Sylvain Privé	No other competitors		
1993	Grenoble	Marie-Pierre Leray; Frédéric Lipka	Sarah Abitbol; Stéphane Bernadis	Line Haddad; Sylvain Privé	
1994	Athis-Mons	Sarah Abitbol; Stéphane Bernadis	Line Haddad; Sylvain Privé	Sophie Guestault; François Guestault	
1995	Bordeaux	Sarah Abitbol; Stéphane Bernadis	Line Haddad; Sylvain Privé	Émilie Gras; Frédéric Lipka	
1996	Albertville	Sarah Abitbol; Stéphane Bernadis	Line Haddad; Sylvain Privé	Sophie Guestault; François Guestault	
1997	Amiens	Sarah Abitbol; Stéphane Bernadis	Sophie Guestault; François Guestault	Alexandra Roger; Vivien Rolland	
1998	Besançon	Sarah Abitbol; Stéphane Bernadis	Line Haddad; Sylvain Privé	Alexandra Roger; Vivien Rolland	
1999	Lyon	Sarah Abitbol; Stéphane Bernadis	No other competitors		
2000	Courchevel	Sarah Abitbol; Stéphane Bernadis	Catherine Huc; Vivien Rolland	No other competitors	
2001	Briançon	Sarah Abitbol; Stéphane Bernadis	Sabrina Lefrançois; Jérôme Blanchard	Marie-Pierre Leray; Nicolas Osseland	
2002	Grenoble	Sarah Abitbol; Stéphane Bernadis	Marie-Pierre Leray; Nicolas Osseland	Lucie Stadelmann; Yannick Bonheur	
2003	Asnières-sur-Seine	Sarah Abitbol; Stéphane Bernadis	Sabrina Lefrançois; Jérôme Blanchard	Marylin Pla; Yannick Bonheur	
2004	Briançon	Sabrina Lefrançois; Jérôme Blanchard	Marylin Pla; Yannick Bonheur	No other competitors	
2005	Rennes	Marylin Pla; Yannick Bonheur	Coralie Zielinski; Jean Louis Lacaille	No other competitors	
2006	Besançon	Marylin Pla; Yannick Bonheur	Rinata Araslanova; Jérôme Blanchard	Mélodie Chataigner; Medhi Bouzzine	
2007	Orléans	Marylin Pla; Yannick Bonheur	Adeline Canac; Maximin Coia	Mélodie Chataigner; Medhi Bouzzine	
2008	Megève	Adeline Canac; Maximin Coia	Mélodie Chataigner; Medhi Bouzzine	Camille Foucher; Bruno Massot	
2009	Colmar	Adeline Canac; Maximin Coia	Mélodie Chataigner; Medhi Bouzzine	Camille Foucher; Bruno Massot	
2010	Marseille	Vanessa James; Yannick Bonheur	Adeline Canac; Maximin Coia	Mélodie Chataigner; Medhi Bouzzine	
2011	Tours	Adeline Canac; Yannick Bonheur	Mélodie Chataigner; Medhi Bouzzine	Anne-Laure Letscher; Bruno Massot	
2012	Dammarie-lès-Lys	Daria Popova; Bruno Massot	Vanessa James; Morgan Ciprès	Anne-Laure Letscher; Artem Patlasov	
2013	Strasbourg	Vanessa James; Morgan Ciprès	Daria Popova; Bruno Massot	No other competitors	
2014	Vaujany	Vanessa James; Morgan Ciprès	No other competitors		
2015	Megève	Vanessa James; Morgan Ciprès	Daria Popova; Andrei Novoselov	No other competitors	
2016	Épinal	Vanessa James; Morgan Ciprès	Camille Mendoza; Pavel Kovalev	No other competitors	
2017	Caen	Vanessa James; Morgan Ciprès	Lola Esbrat; Andrei Novoselov	Camille Mendoza; Pavel Kovalev	
2018	Nantes	Lola Esbrat; Andrei Novoselov	Cléo Hamon; Denys Strekalin	Coline Keriven; Noël-Antoine Pierre	
2019	Vaujany	Vanessa James; Morgan Ciprès	Cléo Hamon; Denys Strekalin	Camille Mendoza; Pavel Kovalev	
2020	Dunkirk	Cléo Hamon; Denys Strekalin	Camille Mendoza; Pavel Kovalev	Coline Keriven; Noël-Antoine Pierre	
2021	Vaujany	Cléo Hamon; Denys Strekalin	Coline Keriven; Noël-Antoine Pierre	No other competitors	
2022	Cergy-Pontoise	Camille Kovalev; Pavel Kovalev	Coline Keriven; Noël-Antoine Pierre	No other competitors	
2023	Rouen	Camille Kovalev; Pavel Kovalev	Oxana Vouillamoz; Flavien Giniaux	Aurélie Faula; Théo Belle	
2024	Vaujany	Camille Kovalev; Pavel Kovalev	Océane Piegad; Denys Strekalin	Lori-Ann Matte; Noël-Antoine Pierre	
2025	Annecy	Camille Kovalev; Pavel Kovalev	Aurélie Faula; Théo Belle	Louise Ehrhard; Matthis Pellegris	
2026	Briançon	Camille Kovalev; Pavel Kovalev	Aurélie Faula; Théo Belle	Louise Ehrhard; Matthis Pellegris	

=== Ice dance ===
Senior ice dance event medalists
Year	Location	Gold	Silver	Bronze	Ref.
1948	Paris	Jacqueline Meudec; Henri Meudec	Geneviève Chamby; Jacques Potin	Micheline Mercier; Jean Streicher	
1949–52	Paris	No ice dance competitors			
1953	Paris	Claude-Gisèle Weinstein; Claude Lambert	Christiane Duvois; Jean-Paul Guhel	Fanny Besson; André Dauger	
1954	Paris	Fanny Besson; Jean-Paul Guhel	Claude-Gisèle Weinstein; Claude Lambert	No other competitors	
1955	Lyon	Fanny Besson; Jean-Paul Guhel	Claude-Gisèle Weinstein; Claude Lambert	No other competitors	
1956	Paris	Fanny Besson; Jean-Paul Guhel	Christiane Elien; Claude Lambert	Claude Lizieux; Jacques Mer	
1957	Boulogne-Billancourt	Fanny Besson; Jean-Paul Guhel	Christiane Elien; Claude Lambert	Annick de Trentinian; Jacques Mer	
1958	Boulogne-Billancourt	Christiane Guhel; Jean-Paul Guhel	Annick de Trentinian; Philippe Aumond	Bernadette Montlahuc; Dominique Duchesne	
1959	Boulogne-Billancourt	Christiane Guhel; Jean-Paul Guhel	Annick de Trentinian; Philippe Aumond	Armelle Flichy; Pierre Brun	
1960	Boulogne-Billancourt	Christiane Guhel; Jean-Paul Guhel	Armelle Flichy; Pierre Brun	Annick de Trentinian; Jacques Mer	
1961	Boulogne-Billancourt	Christiane Guhel; Jean-Paul Guhel	Armelle Flichy; Pierre Brun	Michèle Raisin; Jean-Claude Berthet	
1962	Boulogne-Billancourt	Christiane Guhel; Jean-Paul Guhel	Armelle Flichy; Pierre Brun	Ghislaine Houdas; Francis Gamichon	
1963	Boulogne-Billancourt	Armelle Flichy; Pierre Brun	Ghislaine Bertrand-Houdas; Francis Gamichon	Brigitte Martin; Daniel Georget	
1964	Boulogne-Billancourt	Ghislaine Bertrand-Houdas; Pierre Brun	Brigitte Martin; Francis Gamichon	No other competitors	
1965	Boulogne-Billancourt	Brigitte Martin; Francis Gamichon	Élyane Morand; Daniel Georget	No other competitors	
1966	Boulogne-Billancourt	Brigitte Martin; Francis Gamichon	No other competitors		
1967	Boulogne-Billancourt	Brigitte Martin; Francis Gamichon	Pascale Aynes; Pascal Germe	Élisabeth Bugiel; Michel Bouttier	
1968	Lyon	Claude Cousté; Jean-Pierre Noullet	Mireille Klausner; Jean-Louis Schilz	Pascale Aynes; Pascal Germe	
1969	Boulogne-Billancourt	Éliane Vachon-France; Jean-Pierre Noullet	Anne-Claude Wolfers; Roland Mars	Élisabeth Bugiel; Michel Bouttier	
1970	Lyon	Élisabeth Bugiel; Michel Bouttier	Anne-Claude Wolfers; Roland Mars	Brigitte Ydrault; Pascal Germe	
1971	Boulogne-Billancourt	Anne-Claude Wolfers; Roland Mars	Élisabeth Bugiel; Michel Bouttier	Brigitte Ydrault; Pascal Germe	
1972	Reims	Anne-Claude Wolfers; Roland Mars	Martine Coqblin; Pascal Germe	Muriel Boucher; Yves Malatier	
1973	Asnières-sur-Seine	Anne-Claude Wolfers; Roland Mars	Claude Cousté; Éric Cousté	Muriel Boucher; Yves Malatier	
1974	Viry-Châtillon	Muriel Boucher; Yves Malatier	Frédérique Ramlot; Dominique Laurent	Marie-Joëlle Michel; Frédéric Garcin	
1975	Toulon	Marie-Joëlle Michel; Frédéric Garcin	Muriel Boucher; Yves Malatier	Frédérique Ramlot; Dominique Laurent	
1976	Rouen	Marie-Joëlle Michel; Frédéric Garcin	Muriel Boucher; Yves Malatier	Martine Olivier; Yves Tarayre	
1977	Tours	Muriel Boucher; Yves Malatier	Martine Olivier; Yves Tarayre	Catherine Nicod; Roland Teyssot	
1978	Belfort	Muriel Boucher; Yves Malatier	Martine Olivier; Yves Tarayre	Catherine Le Bail; Pierre Béchu	
1979	Belfort	Martine Olivier; Yves Tarayre	Nathalie Hervé; Pierre Béchu	Isabelle Couquart; Philippe Boissier	
1980	Dijon	Nathalie Hervé; Pierre Béchu	Géraldine Inghelaere; Yves Tarayre	Martine Olivier; Philippe Boissier	
1981	Toulon	Nathalie Hervé; Pierre Béchu	Martine Olivier; Philippe Boissier	Pascale Wlachet; Éric le Mercier	
1982	Arcachon	Nathalie Hervé; Pierre Béchu	Martine Olivier; Philippe Boissier	Sophie Schmidt; Éric Desplats	
1983	Épinal	Nathalie Hervé; Pierre Béchu	Martine Olivier; Philippe Boissier	Guillemette Ferial; Éric Chamoin	
1984	Toulouse	Nathalie Hervé; Pierre Béchu	Sophie Mérigot; Philippe Berthe	Martine Olivier; Philippe Boissier	
1985	Angers	Sophie Mérigot; Philippe Berthe	Martine Olivier; Philippe Boissier	Isabelle Cousin; Martial Mette	
1986	Lyon	Isabelle Duchesnay; Paul Duchesnay	Isabelle Cousin; Martial Mette	Agnès Mommeja; Éric Mommeja	
1987	Dijon	Isabelle Duchesnay; Paul Duchesnay	Corinne Paliard; Didier Courtois	Dominique Yvon; Frédéric Palluel	
1988	Lyon	Corinne Paliard; Didier Courtois	Dominique Yvon; Frédéric Palluel	Sophie Moniotte; Pascal Lavanchy	
1989	Limoges	Dominique Yvon; Frédéric Palluel	Sophie Moniotte; Pascal Lavanchy	Christelle Gautier; Albérick Dallongeville	
1990	Bordeaux	Isabelle Duchesnay; Paul Duchesnay	Dominique Yvon; Frédéric Palluel	Isabelle Sarech; Xavier Debernis	
1991	Dijon	Isabelle Duchesnay; Paul Duchesnay	Sophie Moniotte; Pascal Lavanchy	Isabelle Sarech; Xavier Debernis	
1992	Bordeaux	Dominique Yvon; Frédéric Palluel	Sophie Moniotte; Pascal Lavanchy	Marina Morel; Gwendal Peizerat	
1993	La Roche-sur-Yon	Sophie Moniotte; Pascal Lavanchy	Marina Morel; Gwendal Peizerat	Irina Le Bed; Alexandre Piton	
1994	Rouen	Sophie Moniotte; Pascal Lavanchy	Marina Anissina; Gwendal Peizerat	Bérangère Nau; Luc Monéger	
1995	Besançon	Sophie Moniotte; Pascal Lavanchy	Marina Anissina; Gwendal Peizerat	Barbara Piton; Alexandre Piton	
1996	Lyon	Marina Anissina; Gwendal Peizerat	Barbara Piton; Alexandre Piton	Agnès Jacquemard; Alexis Gayet	
1997	Bordeaux	Marina Anissina; Gwendal Peizerat	Sophie Moniotte; Pascal Lavanchy	Barbara Piton; Alexandre Piton	
1998	Besançon	Marina Anissina; Gwendal Peizerat	Sophie Moniotte; Pascal Lavanchy	Isabelle Delobel; Olivier Schoenfelder	
1999	Lyon	Marina Anissina; Gwendal Peizerat	Dominique Deniaud; Martial Jaffredo	Isabelle Delobel; Olivier Schoenfelder	
2000	Courchevel	Marina Anissina; Gwendal Peizerat	Isabelle Delobel; Olivier Schoenfelder	Alia Ouabdelsselam; Benjamin Delmas	
2001	Briançon	Marina Anissina; Gwendal Peizerat	Isabelle Delobel; Olivier Schoenfelder	Alia Ouabdelsselam; Benjamin Delmas	
2002	Grenoble	Alia Ouabdelsselam; Benjamin Delmas	Roxane Petetin; Matthieu Jost	Caroline Truong; Sylvain Longchambon	
2003	Asnières-sur-Seine	Isabelle Delobel; Olivier Schoenfelder	Roxane Petetin; Matthieu Jost	Nathalie Péchalat; Fabian Bourzat	
2004	Briançon	Isabelle Delobel; Olivier Schoenfelder	Roxane Petetin; Matthieu Jost	Nathalie Péchalat; Fabian Bourzat	
2005	Rennes	Isabelle Delobel; Olivier Schoenfelder	Nathalie Péchalat; Fabian Bourzat	Eve Bentley; Cédric Pernet	
2006	Besançon	Isabelle Delobel; Olivier Schoenfelder	Nathalie Péchalat; Fabian Bourzat	Pernelle Carron; Matthieu Jost	
2007	Orléans	Isabelle Delobel; Olivier Schoenfelder	Nathalie Péchalat; Fabian Bourzat	Pernelle Carron; Matthieu Jost	
2008	Megève	Isabelle Delobel; Olivier Schoenfelder	Pernelle Carron; Matthieu Jost	Zoé Blanc; Pierre-Loup Bouquet	
2009	Colmar	Nathalie Péchalat; Fabian Bourzat	Pernelle Carron; Matthieu Jost	Terra Findlay; Benoît Richaud	
2010	Marseille	Pernelle Carron; Lloyd Jones	Zoé Blanc; Pierre-Loup Bouquet	Olga Orlova; Matthieu Jost	
2011	Tours	Nathalie Péchalat; Fabian Bourzat	Pernelle Carron; Lloyd Jones	Zoé Blanc; Pierre-Loup Bouquet	
2012	Dammarie-lès-Lys	Nathalie Péchalat; Fabian Bourzat	Pernelle Carron; Lloyd Jones	Tiffany Zahorski; Alexis Miart	
2013	Strasbourg	Nathalie Péchalat; Fabian Bourzat	Pernelle Carron; Lloyd Jones	Sarah Robert-Sifaoui; Oleksandr Liubchenko	
2014	Vaujany	Nathalie Péchalat; Fabian Bourzat	Gabriella Papadakis; Guillaume Cizeron	Anastasia Voronkova; Jérémie Flemin	
2015	Megève	Gabriella Papadakis; Guillaume Cizeron	Marie-Jade Lauriault; Romain Le Gac	Péroline Ojardias; Michael Bramante	
2016	Épinal	Gabriella Papadakis; Guillaume Cizeron	Lorenza Alessandrini; Pierre Souquet	Péroline Ojardias; Michael Bramante	
2017	Caen	Gabriella Papadakis; Guillaume Cizeron	Marie-Jade Lauriault; Romain Le Gac	Lorenza Alessandrini; Pierre Souquet	
2018	Nantes	Gabriella Papadakis; Guillaume Cizeron	Marie-Jade Lauriault; Romain Le Gac	Angélique Abachkina; Louis Thauron	
2019	Vaujany	Gabriella Papadakis; Guillaume Cizeron	Marie-Jade Lauriault; Romain Le Gac	Adelina Galyavieva; Louis Thauron	
2020	Dunkirk	Gabriella Papadakis; Guillaume Cizeron	Adelina Galyavieva; Louis Thauron	Evgeniia Lopareva; Geoffrey Brissaud	
2021	Vaujany	Adelina Galyavieva; Louis Thauron	Evgeniia Lopareva; Geoffrey Brissaud	No other competitors	
2022	Cergy-Pontoise	Gabriella Papadakis; Guillaume Cizeron	Evgeniia Lopareva; Geoffrey Brissaud	Loïcia Demougeot; Théo le Mercier	
2023	Rouen	Evgeniia Lopareva; Geoffrey Brissaud	Loïcia Demougeot; Théo le Mercier	Lou Terreaux; Noé Perron	
2024	Vaujany	Evgeniia Lopareva; Geoffrey Brissaud	Loïcia Demougeot; Théo le Mercier	Marie Dupayage; Thomas Nabais	
2025	Annecy	Evgeniia Lopareva; Geoffrey Brissaud	Loïcia Demougeot; Théo le Mercier	Natacha Lagouge; Arnaud Caffa	
2026	Briançon	Laurence Fournier Beaudry; Guillaume Cizeron	Evgeniia Lopareva; Geoffrey Brissaud	Loïcia Demougeot; Théo le Mercier	

== Junior medalists ==
=== Men's singles ===
Junior men's event medalists
Year	Location	Gold	Silver	Bronze	Ref.
2011	Cergy-Pontoise	Romain Ponsart	Thomas Sosniak	Simon Hocquaux	
2012	Charleville-Mézières	Noël-Antoine Pierre	Charles Tetar	Gaylord Lavoisier	
2013	Épinal	Simon Hocquaux	Charles Tetar	Kévin Aymoz	
2014	Wasquehal	Simon Hocquaux	Adrien Tesson	Kévin Aymoz	
2015	Lyon	Kévin Aymoz	Adrien Tesson	Daniel Albert Naurits	
2016	Poitiers	Kévin Aymoz	Adrien Tesson	Luc Economides	
2017	Cergy-Pontoise	Adam Siao Him Fa	Maxence Collet	Luc Economides	
2018	Paris	Luc Economides	Adam Siao Him Fa	Landry Le May	
2019	Viry-Châtillon	Adam Siao Him Fa	Xavier Vauclin	Landry Le May	
2020	Charleville-Mézières	Adam Siao Him Fa	Yann Frechon	Tom Bouvart	
2021	Competition cancelled due to the COVID-19 pandemic				
2022	Charleville-Mézières	Corentin Spinar	François Pitot	Ian Vauclin	
2023	Bordeaux	Ian Vauclin	Ilia Gogitidze	Axel Ahmed	
2024	Nice	François Pitot	Ilia Gogitidze	Axel Ahmed	
2025	Villard-de-Lans	Gianni Motilla	Ilia Gogitidze	Jean Medard	

=== Women's singles ===
Junior women's event medalists
Year	Location	Gold	Silver	Bronze	Ref.
2011	Cergy-Pontoise	Anaïs Ventard	Laurine Lecavelier	Léna Marrocco	
2012	Charleville-Mézières	Anaïs Ventard	Laurianne Cirilli	Laurine Lecavelier	
2013	Épinal	Laurine Lecavelier	Bahia Taleb	Nadjma Mahamoud	
2014	Wasquehal	Nadjma Mahamoud	Lénaëlle Gilleron-Gorry	Laurine Lecavelier	
2015	Lyon	Julie Froetscher	Léa Serna	Marina Popov	
2016	Poitiers	Alizée Crozet	Julie Froetscher	Élodie Eudine	
2017	Cergy-Pontoise	Sandra Ramond	Alizée Crozet	Julie Froetscher	
2018	Paris	Léa Serna	Alizée Crozet	Julie Froetscher	
2019	Viry-Châtillon	Anna Kuzmenko	Maïa Mazzara (Switzerland)	Lorine Schild	
2020	Charleville-Mézières	Maïa Mazzara	Océane Piegad	Lorine Schild	
2021	Competition cancelled due to the COVID-19 pandemic				
2022	Charleville-Mézières	Lola Ghozali	Lorine Schild	Ève Dubecq	
2023	Bordeaux	Lorine Schild	Clemence Mayindu	Ève Dubecq	
2024	Nice	Stefania Gladki	Ève Dubecq	Ninon Dapoigny	
2025	Villard-de-Lans	Ève Dubecq	Lily-Rose Laguerre	Louane Wolff	

=== Pairs ===
Junior pairs event medalists
Year	Location	Gold	Silver	Bronze	Ref.
2011	Cergy-Pontoise	Marie Diamoneka; Artem Patlasov	No other competitors		
2012–16	No junior pairs competitors				
2017	Cergy-Pontoise	Cléo Hamon; Denys Strekalin	No other competitors		
2018	Paris	Cléo Hamon; Denys Strekalin	No other competitors		
2019	Viry-Châtillon	Cléo Hamon; Denys Strekalin	Liudmila Molchanova; Remi Belmonte	No other competitors	
2020	Charleville-Mézières	Cléo Hamon; Denys Strekalin	No other competitors		
2021	Competition cancelled due to the COVID-19 pandemic				
2022	Charleville-Mézières	Oxana Vouillamoz; Flavien Giniaux	Louise Ehrhard; Matthis Pellegris	No other competitors	
2023	Bordeaux	Oxana Vouillamoz; Flavien Giniaux	Louise Ehrhard; Matthis Pellegris	No other competitors	
2024	Nice	Louise Ehrhard; Matthis Pellegris	Romane Télémaque; Lucas Coulon	Lise Regnier; Luca Nandrot	
2025	Villard-de-Lans	Romane Télémaque; Lucas Coulon	Clelia Liget-Latus; Allan Daniel Fisher	No other competitors	

=== Ice dance ===
Junior ice dance event medalists
Year	Location	Gold	Silver	Bronze	Ref.
2008	Viry-Châtillon	Maureen Ibaniez; Neil Brown	Terra Findlay; Benoît Richaud	Charlène Guignard; Guillaume Paulmier	
2009	Annecy	Charlène Guignard; Guillaume Paulmier	Anne Sophie Bilet; Adrien Hamon	Rowan Musson; Neil Brown	
2010	Brest	Gabriella Papadakis; Guillaume Cizeron	Géraldine Bott; Neil Brown	Myriam Gassoumi; Arnaud Pasztory	
2011	Besançon	Gabriella Papadakis; Guillaume Cizeron	Géraldine Bott; Neil Brown	Tiffany Zahorski; Alexis Miart	
2012	Charleville-Mézières	Estelle Elizabeth; Romain Le Gac	Magali Leininger; Maxime Caurel	Myriam Gassoumi; Clément Le Molaire	
2013	Épinal	Gabriella Papadakis; Guillaume Cizeron	Estelle Elizabeth; Romain Le Gac	Péroline Ojardias; Pierre Souquet	
2014	Wasquehal	Estelle Elizabeth; Romain Le Gac	Angélique Abachkina; Louis Thauron	Myriam Gassoumi; Clément Le Molaire	
2015	Lyon	Angélique Abachkina; Louis Thauron	Sarah-Marine Rouffanche; Geoffrey Brissaud	Adelina Galyavieva; Laurent Abecassis	
2016	Poitiers	Marie-Jade Lauriault; Romain Le Gac	Angélique Abachkina; Louis Thauron	Sarah-Marine Rouffanche; Geoffrey Brissaud	
2017	Cergy-Pontoise	Natacha Lagouge; Corentin Rahier	Sarah-Marine Rouffanche; Geoffrey Brissaud	Julia Wagret; Mathieu Couyras	
2018	Paris	Natacha Lagouge; Corentin Rahier	Mathilde Viard; Renan Manceaux	Loïcia Demougeot; Théo le Mercier	
2019	Viry-Châtillon	Loïcia Demougeot; Théo le Mercier	Evgeniia Lopareva; Geoffrey Brissaud	Marie Dupayage; Thomas Nabais	
2020	Charleville-Mézières	Loïcia Demougeot; Théo le Mercier	Lou Terreaux; Noé Perron	Célina Fradji; Jean-Hans Fourneaux	
2021	Villard-de-Lans	Marie Dupayage; Thomas Nabais	Loïcia Demougeot; Théo le Mercier	Lou Terreaux; Noé Perron	
2022	Charleville-Mézières	Célina Fradji; Jean-Hans Fourneaux	Eva Bernard; Tom Jochum	Lila-Maya Seclet Monchot; Martin Chardain	
2023	Bordeaux	Louise Bordet; Thomas Gipoulou	Célina Fradji; Jean-Hans Fourneaux	Ambre Perrier Gianesini; Samuel Blanc Klaperman	
2024	Nice	Ambre Perrier Gianesini; Samuel Blanc Klaperman	Célina Fradji; Jean-Hans Fourneaux	Alisa Ovsiankina; Maximilien Rahier	
2025	Villard-de-Lans	Célina Fradji; Jean-Hans Fourneaux	Ambre Perrier Gianesini; Samuel Blanc Klaperman	Dania Mouaden; Théo Bigot	
2026	Briançon	Ambre Perrier Gianesini; Samuel Blanc Klaperman	Dania Mouaden; Théo Bigot	Lou Koch; Lucas Chataignoux	

== Records ==
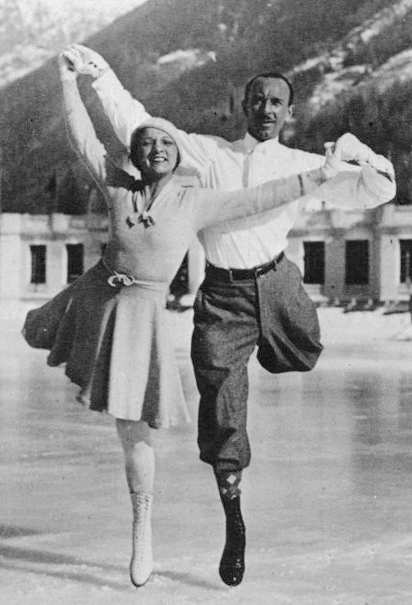
Andrée Brunet and her husband Pierre Brunet won a record eleven French Championship titles in pair skating.

Records
Discipline	Most championship titles			
Discipline	Skater(s)	No.	Years	Ref.
Men's singles	Alain Giletti	10	1951–57; 1959–61	
Women's singles	Andrée Brunet (née Joly)	10	1921–30	
Pairs	Andrée Brunet (née Joly); Pierre Brunet	11	1924–33; 1935	
Ice dance	Jean-Paul Guhel (Note: Jean-Paul Guhel won four championship titles while partnered with Fanny Besson (1954–57), and five with Christiane Guhel (1958–62).)	9	1954–62	

== Works cited ==
- Billouin, Alain (1999). Le livre d'or du patinage [The Golden Book of Skating] (in French). Paris: Éditions Solar. ISBN 2-263-02953-2.
