= Elvire Barbey =

Swiss figure skater

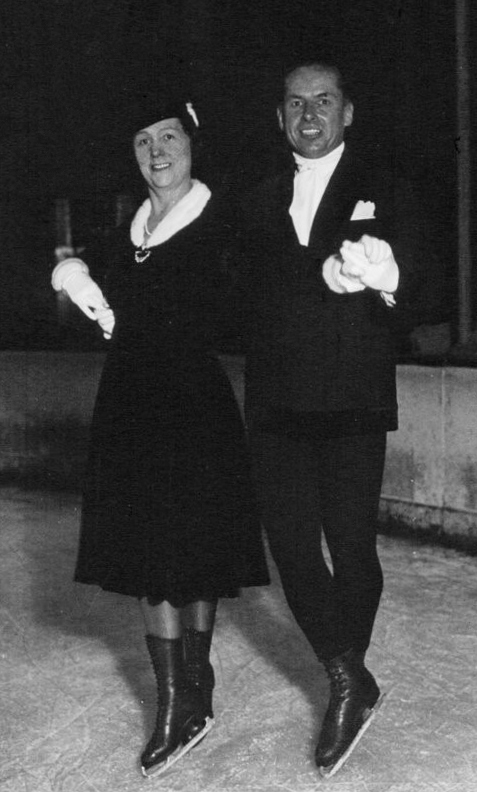
Elvira and Louis Barbey in 1932.

Elvira Barbey (7 August 1892 – 18 August 1971) was a Swiss figure skater. She competed at the 1928 Winter Olympics and finished 19th in singles and 11th in pairs, together with her husband Louis Barbey. She and Louis later won the French Figure Skating Championships in 1934 and 1936. Their daughter Gaby Clericetti also became a competitive figure skater.
