= Florence Kahn =

Florence Kahn may refer to:

- Florence Prag Kahn (1866–1948), American teacher and politician
- Florence Kahn (actress) (1878–1951), American actress and wife of Sir Max Beerbohm

== See also ==
- Florence Cahn (born 1954), French figure skater
