= Sylvain Privé =

French figure skater (born 1970)

Sylvain Privé (born 27 March 1970 in Montmorency, Val-d'Oise) is a French figure skater who competed in pairs.

With partner Line Haddad, Privé won the gold medal at the 1992 French Figure Skating Championships and finished 16th at the 1992 Winter Olympics.
