= Louis Barbey =

Swiss figure skater

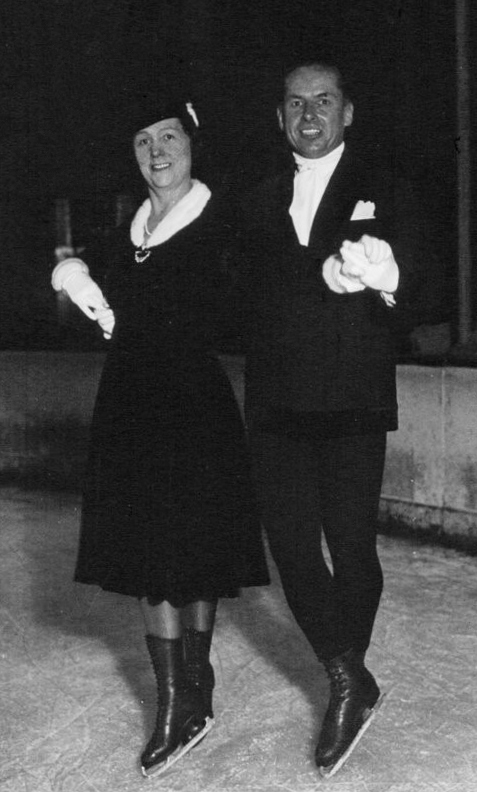
Elvira and Louis Barbey in 1932.

Louis Barbey (10 November 1888 – 28 October 1978) was a Swiss figure skater. He competed in pairs at the 1928 Winter Olympics and finished 11th in pairs, together with his wife Elvira Barbey.

They won the French Figure Skating Championships in 1934 and 1936. Their daughter Gaby Clericetti also became a competitive figure skater.
