= Béatrice Farinacci =

French figure skater

Béatrice Farinacci (born 9 September 1964) is a former French figure skater who competed in ladies singles. She is the 1982 French champion.

== Results ==
International
Event	1979	1980	1981	1982	1983
World Champ.				21st	24th
European Champ.			WD	19th	
International: Junior
World Junior Champ.	14th	7th			
National
French Champ.		3rd	2nd	1st	2nd
WD = Withdrew
