= Benjamin Delmas =

French ice dancer

Personal information
- Born: 17 May 1976 (age 50) Châlons-sur-Marne, France
- Height: 1.71 m (5 ft 7 1/2 in)

Figure skating career
- Country: France
- Began skating: 1983
- Retired: 2002

Benjamin Delmas (born 17 May 1976) is a French former competitive ice dancer. He had the most success with partner Alia Ouabdelsselam. They teamed up in 1997 and split in 2002. During their career, they won the 2002 French Figure Skating Championships and placed as high as 13th at the European Figure Skating Championships.

Before teaming up with Ouabdelsselam, Delmas competed with Barbara Piton and Myriam Parry.

== Programs ==
(with Ouabdelsselam)

Season	Original dance	Free dance
2001–02	Tango: La cumparsita by Gerardo Matos Rodríguez; Carmen by Georges Bizet; Tango: La cumparsita by Gerardo Matos Rodríguez	Fly; Something performed by Sarah Brightman; The Fifth Element by Éric Serra
2000–01	Man Wanted	Xotica by René Dupéré

== Results ==
GP: Grand Prix

=== With Ouabdelsselam ===
International
Event	97–98	98–99	99–00	00–01	01–02
World Champ.					17th
European Champ.				14th	13th
GP Cup of Russia			6th	8th	
GP NHK Trophy					7th
GP Skate America				7th	
GP Sparkassen Cup			6th		4th
Lysiane Lauret	3rd				
Nebelhorn Trophy		3rd	2nd		
PFSA Trophy	3rd				
Schäfer Memorial		2nd			
Tallinn Cup		2nd			
National
French Champ.	6th	4th	3rd	3rd	1st

=== With Parry ===
International
Event	1995–96
Lysiane Lauret Challenge	8th

=== With Piton ===
International
Event	1991–92	1992–93
World Junior Championships	14th	
Autumn Trophy		6th J
Grand Prize SNP	1st J	
J = Junior level
