= Jacques Mrozek =

French figure skater

Personal information
- Born: 11 May 1950 (age 76) Paris, France
- Height: 1.71 m (5 ft 7 1/2 in)

Figure skating career
- Country: France
- Coach: Michel Mrozek, Pierre Brunet, Nate Walley, Donald McPherson
- Skating club: Français Volants
- Retired: 1973

Jacques Mrozek (born 11 May 1950 in Paris) is a French former figure skater who won the 1973 national title in men's singles. He competed at two Winter Olympics, placing 20th in 1968 (Grenoble) and 14th in 1972 (Sapporo). He finished in the top ten at the 1973 World Championships in Bratislava and at three European Championships – 1969 (Garmisch-Partenkirchen), 1971 (Zurich), and 1973 (Cologne).

== Competitive highlights ==
International
Event	67–68	68–69	69–70	70–71	71–72	72–73
Winter Olympics	20th				14th	
World Champ.		14th	15th	13th	11th	9th
European Champ.	16th	10th	11th	9th		8th
St. Gervais					1st	
Prague Skate						3rd
National
French Champ.	3rd	3rd	2nd	2nd		1st
