= Nathalie Hervé =

French ice dancer

Personal information
- Born: 28 March 1963 (age 63) Troyes, France
- Height: 1.64 m (5 ft 4 1/2 in)

Figure skating career
- Country: France
- Retired: 1984

Nathalie Hervé (born 28 March 1963) is a French former ice dancer. With Pierre Béchu, Hervé became a five-time French national champion, from 1980 to 1984. They placed eighth at the 1981 World Championships, fifth at the 1983 European Championships, and 14th at the 1984 Winter Olympics.

== Death ==
In August 1988, Hervé and Béchu were traveling with their daughter, Johanna, when their vehicle collided with another, killing Béchu and Johanna.

== Results ==
=== With Béchu ===
International
Event	1978–79	1979–80	1980–81	1981–82	1982–83	1983–84
Winter Olympics						14th
World Championships		12th	8th	11th	WD	
European Championships		11th	6th	6th	5th	8th
St. Gervais		2nd	2nd			
National
French Championships	2nd	1st	1st	1st	1st	1st
WD = Withdrew

=== With Husarek ===
International
Event	1977	1978
World Junior Championships	8th	3rd
