= Axel Médéric =

French figure skater

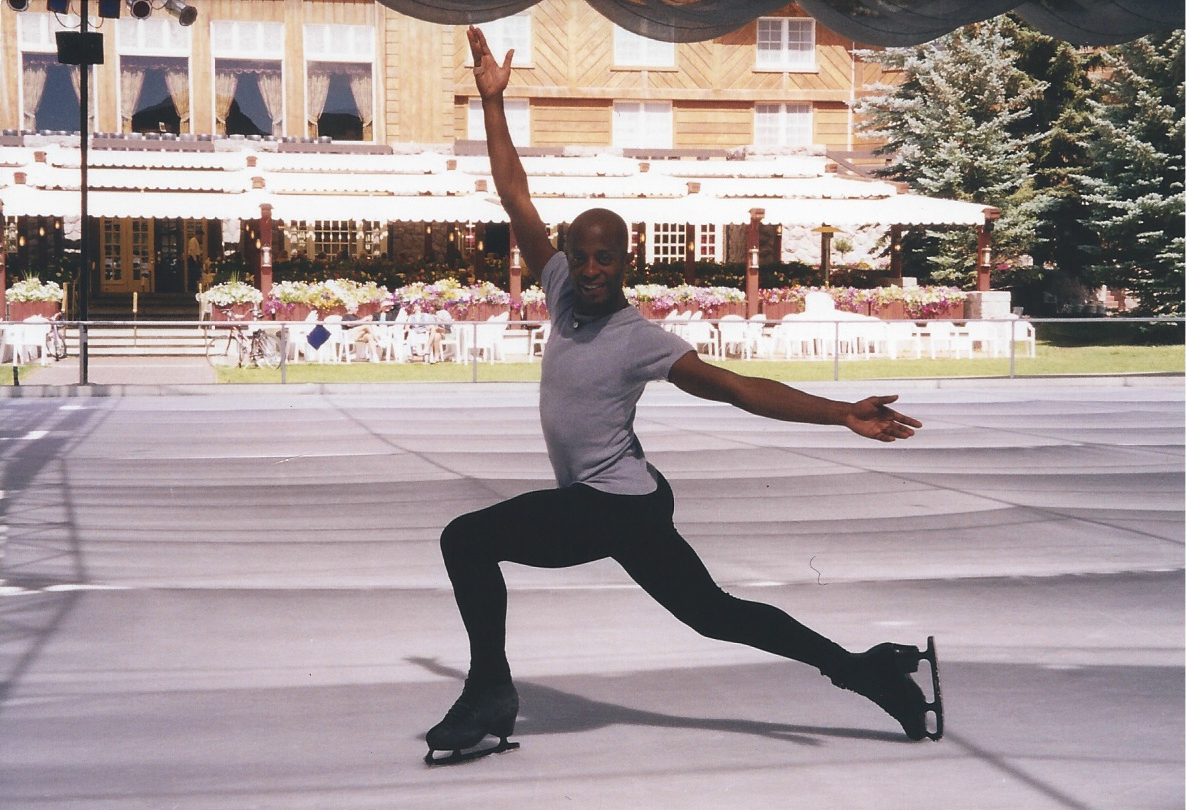
Axel Mederic practice session in Sun Valley, Idaho

Axel Médéric (born 29 May 1970 in Créteil, France) is a former French figure skater who competed in men's singles. In 1988, he won the silver medal at the French Figure Skating Championships and placed fifteenth at the 1988 Winter Olympics. The following year, he captured the French national title, finished seventh at the European Figure Skating Championships, and placed thirteenth at the World Figure Skating Championships.

== Results ==
International
Event	84–85	85–86	86–87	87–88	88–89	89–90	90–91	91–92	92–93	93–94
Olympics				15th						
Worlds					13th			33rd		
Europeans				10th	7th					
Inter. de Paris				8th	8th			5th	5th	
Nations Cup							5th			10th
NHK Trophy					13th					
Nebelhorn									3rd	
International: Junior
Junior Worlds	8th	11th								
National
French Champ.			5th	2nd	1st	5th	5th	4th	5th	
