= Jean-Roland Racle =

French pair skater

Jean-Roland Racle (born 9 September 1947 in Bagnolet) is a French former pair skater who competed with several different partners.

With Fabienne Etlensperfer, Racle won the gold medal at the French Figure Skating Championships in 1967 and 1968. They also finished 18th at the European Figure Skating Championships in 1968. Then, with Florence Cahn, he won four straight national championships from 1971 to 1974. The pair also competed in the 1972 Winter Olympics, finishing 13th. In 1975, he won another French title, this time with Pascale Kovelmann. He added an eight national crown with Caroline Verchère in 1976.
