= Fernand Fédronic =

French figure skater

Personal information
- Born: 21 December 1964 (age 61) Paris, France

Figure skating career
- Country: France
- Coach: Didier Gailhaguet
- Retired: 1988

Fernand Fédronic (born 21 December 1964) is a French former competitive figure skater. He is the 1982 Grand Prix International St. Gervais champion, 1984 Golden Spin of Zagreb bronze medalist, and 1985 1985 French national champion. He placed in the top ten at two European Championships and in the top fifteen at two World Championships. His elder brother, Dominique, also competed in figure skating.

In 2014, Fédronic became the president of the World Inline Figure Skating Association.

== Competitive highlights ==
International
Event	78–79	79–80	80–81	81–82	82–83	83–84	84–85	85–86	86–87	87–88
Worlds						12th	15th			
Europeans					10th		7th			
Golden Spin							3rd			
Inter. de Paris										6th
St. Gervais					1st					
International: Junior
Junior Worlds	8th		11th							
National
French Champ.					3rd	3rd	1st		3rd	3rd
WD = Withdrew
