= Jérôme Blanchard =

French pair skater

Personal information
- Born: 20 July 1981 (age 44) Lyon, France
- Height: 1.86 m (6 ft 1 in)

Figure skating career
- Country: France
- Retired: 2011

Jérôme Blanchard (born 20 July 1981) is a French former pair skater. With Sabrina Lefrançois, he is the 2004 French national champion. He also competed for one season with Maria Mukhortova.

== Career ==
With partner Sabrina Lefrançois, he won the gold medal at the 2004 French Figure Skating Championships. She retired due to injury. He later trained with Rinata Araslanova. In mid-2007, he began skating with Valeria Vorobieva. The French skating federation was reluctant to release Blanchard but after a long battle he was free to skate with Vorobieva for Russia. However, they did not compete in any international events and their partnership dissolved.

Blanchard then skated in Russian ice shows. He was partnered with singer Yulia Savicheva for the Star Ice show. In May 2010, Blanchard teamed up with Maria Mukhortova to compete for Russia. At the 2011 Russian Nationals, they finished 7th overall. In February 2011, their coach Oleg Vasiliev said they had taken some time off due to funding issues. On March 4, Vasiliev confirmed their partnership had ended and Blanchard had returned to France to work at the family hotel.

At fall 2015, Blanchard started coaching single skating at Figure Skating Amsterdam, the Netherlands. His students include:

- Sam Jansen (National Champion Advanced Novice)
- Linden van Bemmel
- Kyarha van Tiel (till 2017)
- Kylie Loots (National Champion Advanced Novice)
- Tyler ter Meulen (former artistic rollerskating European Youth champion)

== Programs ==
=== With Mukhortova ===
Season	Short program	Free skating
2010–2011	Song from a Secret Garden by Secret Garden	The Nutcracker by Pyotr Tchaikovsky

=== With Lefrançois ===
Season	Short program	Free skating
2003–2004	Gotan Project	Once Upon a Time in America by Ennio Morricone
2002–2003	Valse triste by Jean Sibelius	Romeo and Juliet by Sergei Prokofiev

== Competitive highlights ==
=== With Mukhortova ===
Event	2010–11
Russian Championships	7th

=== With Lefrançois ===
International
Event	2000–01	2002–03	2003–04
World Champ.	14th		11th
European Champ.	5th		6th
GP Lalique	8th	10th	6th
GP Skate Canada	5th		
Karl Schäfer	3rd		
National
French Champ.	2nd	2nd	1st
GP = Grand Prix; WD = Withdrew
