= Michèle Allard =

French figure skater

Michèle Allard is a former French figure skater who competed in ladies' singles and pairs with Alain Giletti. She is the 1956 French champion in both categories.

== Results ==
Event	1955	1956
European Championships	12th	21st
French Championships	2nd	1st
