= Geneviève Burdel =

French figure skater

Geneviève Burdel (29 November 1946 – 14 March 2005) was a French figure skater who competed in ladies singles. She won the bronze medal at the French Figure Skating Championships in 1963 and 1964. She finished 18th at the European Figure Skating Championships in 1964 and 29th at the Winter Olympics that year. She was born in Paris, France.
