= Yves Tarayre =

French ice dancer

Figure skating career
- Country: France

Yves Tarayre is a French former ice dancer. With Martine Olivier, he is the 1976 World Junior bronze medalist and 1979 French national champion. They trained in Châlons-en-Champagne. After their partnership ended, he competed with Géraldine Inghelaere.

== Competitive highlights ==
=== With Olivier ===
International
Event	1975–76	1976–77	1977–78	1978–79
World Championships				16th
European Championships				13th
World Junior Champ.	3rd			
National
French Championships	3rd	2nd	2nd	1st

=== Inghelaere ===
National
Event	1979–80
French Championships	2nd
