= Jean Henrion =

French figure skater

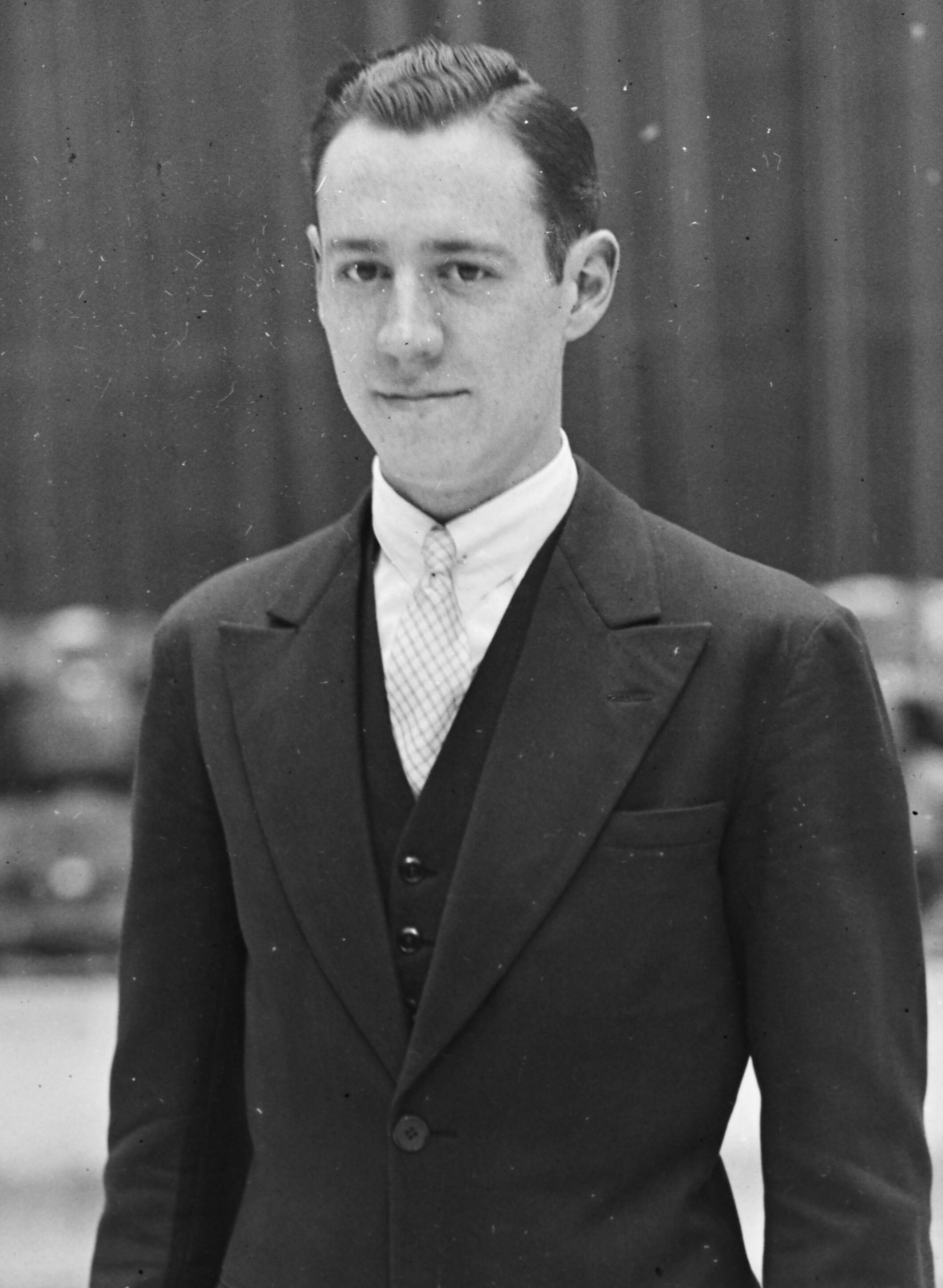
- Henrion at the 1932 French Championships

Personal information
- Born: 25 May 1908
- Died: 6 March 1996 (aged 87)

Figure skating career
- Country: France

Jean Henrion (25 May 1908 – 6 March 1996) was a French figure skater. He was the 1932–1939 French champion in men's singles and a two-time national pairs champion with Suzy Boulesteix.

== Results ==
Event	1927	1930	1932	1933	1934	1935	1936	1937	1938	1939
World Championships	8th			9th			12th			
European Championships			6th	4th	11th	11th	12th	11th		
French Championships	2nd	2nd	1st	1st	1st	1st	1st	1st	1st	1st
