= Yves Malatier =

French ice dancer

Figure skating career
- Country: France
- Retired: 1978

Yves Malatier is a French retired competitive ice dancer. He competed with Muriel Boucher and together they are the 1977 and 1978 French national champions. They competed twice at the European Figure Skating Championships, with the highest placement of 13th, which they achieved in 1978. They placed 15th at the 1978 World Figure Skating Championships.

== Results ==
(ice dance with Muriel Boucher)

International
Event	1971–72	1972–73	1973–74	1974–75	1975–76	1976–77	1977–78
Worlds							15th
Europeans						14th	13th
St. Gervais						2nd	2nd
National
French Champ.	3rd	3rd	1st	2nd	2nd	1st	1st
