= Martine Olivier =

French ice dancer

Figure skating career
- Country: France
- Retired: 1985

Martine Olivier is a French former ice dancer. With Yves Tarayre, she is the 1976 World Junior bronze medalist and 1979 French national champion. They trained in Châlons-en-Champagne. In mid-1979, Olivier teamed up with Philippe Boissier, with whom she competed at three World Championships and two European Championships. She retired from competition in 1985.

== Competitive highlights ==
=== With Tarayre ===
International
Event	1975–76	1976–77	1977–78	1978–79
World Championships				16th
European Championships				13th
World Junior Champ.	3rd			
National
French Championships	3rd	2nd	2nd	1st

=== With Boissier ===
International
Event	1979–80	1980–81	1981–82	1982–83	1983–84	1984–85
World Championships			17th		20th	17th
European Championships			16th			12th
National
French Championships	3rd	2nd	2nd	2nd	3rd	2nd
