= Xavier Videau =

French figure skater

Xavier Videau was a French figure skater who competed in pairs. He won the gold medal at the French Figure Skating Championships for six straight years, with three different partners.

With partner Sabine Fuchs, Videau won French national titles from 1977 to 1979. They also finished 9th at the European Figure Skating Championships in 1977 and 1978, and came in 12th at the World Figure Skating Championships in 1978. He then teamed with Hélène Glabek and won the gold medal at the French Championships in 1980. With Nathalie Tortel, he captured the national crown in 1981 and 1982. They finished 8th at the European Championships in 1982 and 12th at that year's World Championships.

Following his competitive career, Videau became a coach. He currently coaches at the Olympic View Arena in Mountlake Terrace, Washington.
