= Sabrina Lefrançois =

French pair skater

Personal information
- Born: 22 November 1980 (age 45) Harfleur, France
- Height: 1.56 m (5 ft 1 1/2 in)

Figure skating career
- Country: France
- Began skating: 1988
- Retired: 2004

Sabrina Lefrançois (born 22 November 1980) is a French former pair skater. With Nicolas Osseland, she placed fourth at the 1997 World Junior Championships, 12th at the 1997 European Championships, and 17th at the 1998 Winter Olympics. She later competed with Jérôme Blanchard and won the 2004 French national title.

== Programs ==
(with Blanchard)

Season	Short program	Free skating
2003–2004	Gotan Project	Once Upon a Time in America by Ennio Morricone
2002–2003	Valse triste by Jean Sibelius	Romeo and Juliet by Sergei Prokofiev

== Results ==
=== With Blanchard ===
International
Event	2000–01	2001–02	2002–03	2003–04
World Champ.	14th			11th
European Champ.	5th			6th
GP Cup of Russia				WD
GP Lalique	8th		10th	6th
GP Skate Canada	5th			
Karl Schäfer	3rd			
National
French Champ.	2nd		2nd	1st
GP = Grand Prix; WD = Withdrew

=== With Osseland ===
International
Event	1995–96	1996–97	1997–98
Winter Olympics			17th
European Champ.		12th	
International: Junior
World Junior Champ.		4th	5th
JGP Slovakia			2nd
Blue Swords		3rd J.	
National
French Champ.	4th	WD	
J. = Junior level; JGP = Junior Series (Junior Grand Prix); WD = Withdrew
