= Alia Ouabdelsselam =

French ice dancer

Personal information
- Born: 20 April 1978 (age 48) Antony, Hauts-de-Seine, France
- Height: 1.63 m (5 ft 4 in)

Figure skating career
- Country: France
- Began skating: 1981
- Retired: 2002

Alia Ouabdelsselam (born 20 April 1978) is a French former competitive ice dancer. She competed for most of her career with Benjamin Delmas. They teamed up in 1997 and split in 2002. During their career, they won the 2002 French Figure Skating Championships and placed as high as 13th at the European Figure Skating Championships.

Before teaming up with Delmas, Ouabdelsselam competed with Luc Monéger.

== Programs ==
(with Delmas)

Season	Original dance	Free dance
2001–02	Tango: La cumparsita by Gerardo Matos Rodríguez; Carmen by Georges Bizet; Tango: La cumparsita by Gerardo Matos Rodríguez	Fly; Something performed by Sarah Brightman; The Fifth Element by Éric Serra
2000–01	Man Wanted	Xotica by René Dupéré

== Results ==
GP: Grand Prix

=== With Delmas ===
International
Event	97–98	98–99	99–00	00–01	01–02
World Champ.					17th
European Champ.				14th	13th
GP Cup of Russia			6th	8th	
GP NHK Trophy					7th
GP Skate America				7th	
GP Sparkassen Cup			6th		4th
Lysiane Lauret	3rd				
Nebelhorn Trophy		3rd	2nd		
PFSA Trophy	3rd				
Schäfer Memorial		2nd			
Tallinn Cup		2nd			
National
French Champ.	6th	4th	3rd	3rd	1st

=== With Monéger ===
National
Event	1996–97
French Championships	8th
