= Jacqueline Vaudecrane =

French figure skater

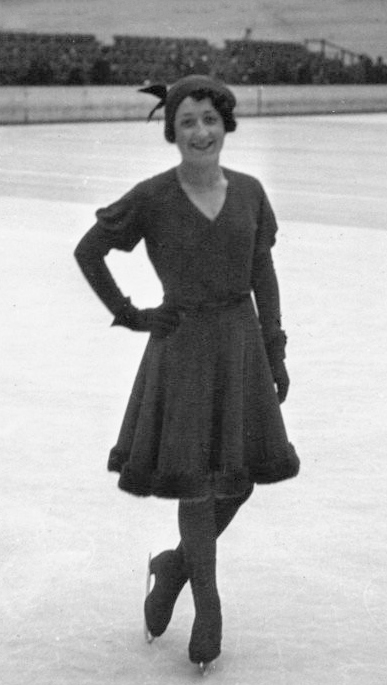
Jacqueline Vaudecrane at the 1932 European Championships

Jacqueline Vaudecrane (22 November 1913 – 27 February 2018) was a French figure skater who competed in ladies singles. She finished first at the French Figure Skating Championships in 1937 and 1938. She celebrated her 100th birthday in 2013 and died in February 2018 at the age of 104.

== Career ==
Jacqueline Vaudecrane was one of the leading French figure skaters of the 1930s, known for her elegance and technical skills. After retiring from competitive skating, she became a highly respected coach, mentoring generations of figure skaters in France. Among her students were world champions Jacqueline du Bief, Alain Giletti and Alain Calmat, world and Olympic medalist Patrick Péra and Didier Gailhaguet, who later became the president of the French Federation of Ice Sports.

== Coaching and legacy ==
Vaudecrane played a key role in the development of figure skating in France, coaching both national and international competitors. Her influence extended beyond France, as she was involved in training skaters at various levels and shaping the next generations of athletes.
