= Frédéric Palluel =

French ice dancer

Personal information
- Born: 15 December 1967 (age 58) Paris, France

Figure skating career
- Country: France
- Retired: 1992

Frédéric Palluel (born 15 December 1967) is a French former ice dancer. With Dominique Yvon, he is a two-time French national champion (1989, 1992). They finished 8th at the 1992 Winter Olympics and 7th at the 1992 World Championships.

== Results ==
With Yvon:

International
Event	85–86	86–87	87–88	88–89	89–90	90–91	91–92
Olympics							8th
Worlds			16th	12th	WD	8th	7th
Europeans				8th	6th	7th	7th
Inter. de Paris			5th	5th	4th		2nd
NHK Trophy				4th		4th	
Skate America				7th	4th		3rd
St. Gervais		3rd					
International: Junior
Junior Worlds	5th						
National
French Champ.		3rd	2nd	1st	2nd	WD	1st
WD = Withdrew
