= Micheline Joubert =

French figure skater

Personal information
- Born: 18 June 1945 (age 81) Paris, France

Figure skating career
- Country: France
- Partner: Alain Trouillet, Philippe Pélissier
- Retired: 1968

Micheline Joubert (born 18 June 1945, in Paris) is a French former figure skater who competed in single skating and pair skating. As a pairs skater, she won the gold medal at the French Figure Skating Championships four times, with Philippe Pélissier from 1960 to 1962, and with Alain Trouillet in 1964. As a single skater, she finished second at the French championships four times and finished 20th at the 1968 Winter Olympics

Micheline is no relation to fellow French skater Brian Joubert.

== Results ==
=== Ladies' singles ===
International
Event	62–63	63–64	64–65	65–66	66–67	67–68
Winter Olympics						20th
World Championships					17th	
European Champ.	18th	13th		16th	17th	
National
French Championships	2nd			2nd	2nd	2nd

=== Pairs with Pélissier ===
National
Event	1959–60	1960–61	1961–62
French Championships	1st	1st	1st

=== Pairs with Trouillet ===
International
Event	1963–64
European Championships	13th
National
French Championships	1st
