= Véronique Fleury =

French figure skater

Véronique Fleury (born c. 1977) is a former French figure skater. She was the 1996 silver medalist at the French Figure Skating Championships. She finished 17th at the 1996 European Championships and 31st at the World Championships.

== Results ==
Event	1995-96
World Championships	31st
European Championships	17th
French Championships	2nd
