= Corinne Paliard =

French ice dancer

Personal information
- Born: 24 October 1970 (age 55)

Figure skating career
- Country: France
- Retired: 1988

Corinne Paliard (born 24 October 1970) is a former ice dancer who represented France. With partner Didier Courtois, she is the 1986 World Junior bronze medalist and 1988 French national champion. They placed 10th at the 1988 European Championships and 14th at the 1988 Winter Olympics.

== Competitive highlights ==
(with Courtois)

International
Event	1983–84	1984–85	1985–86	1986–87	1987–88
Winter Olympics					14th
European Champ.				11th	10th
International de Paris					3rd
NHK Trophy					6th
Karl Schäfer Memorial					3rd
International: Junior
World Junior Champ.	9th		3rd		
National
French Champ.				2nd	1st
