= Éric Millot =

French figure skater

Personal information
- Born: 12 December 1968 (age 57) Reims, France
- Height: 1.65 m (5 ft 5 in)

Figure skating career
- Country: France
- Skating club: Reims SCRP
Medal record
Figure skating: Men's singles
Representing France
European Championships
Bronze medal – third place	1993 Paris	Men's singles
Grand Prix Final
Bronze medal – third place	1995–96 Paris	Men's singles
French Championships
Gold medal – first place	1990 Annecy	Men's singles
Gold medal – first place	1991 Reims	Men's singles
Gold medal – first place	1992 Colombes	Men's singles
Gold medal – first place	1993 Grenoble	Men's singles
Silver medal – second place	1989 Caen	Men's singles
Silver medal – second place	1994 Athis-Mons	Men's singles
Silver medal – second place	1995 Bordeaux	Men's singles
Silver medal – second place	1996 Albertville	Men's singles

Éric Millot (French: [eʁik mijo]; 12 December 1968) is a French former competitive figure skater. He is the 1993 European bronze medalist, the 1995–96 Champions Series Final bronze medalist, and a four-time (1990–93) French national champion. He represented France at the 1992 Winter Olympics in Albertville, where he placed 15th, and at the 1994 Winter Olympics in Lillehammer, where he placed 7th. He is also the first skater to land a triple loop-triple loop combination in competition.

With wife Valerie and young daughter, the Millot family moved to California (Palm Springs and then San Diego) in the late 1990s. While in San Diego, Millot skated with Sea World summer nights skating show and coached at local rinks. His son was born in 2006. In 2013, Millot relocated to the Toyota Sports Center in El Segundo, California to coach alongside Frank Carroll.

== Competitive highlights ==
GP: Champions Series (Grand Prix)

International
Event	86–87	87–88	88–89	89–90	90–91	91–92	92–93	93–94	94–95	95–96	96–97
Olympics						15th		7th			
Worlds					9th		7th	5th	5th	7th	12th
Europeans			13th	19th	4th	8th	3rd	4th	5th	8th	
GP Final										3rd	
GP Trophée de France/Lalique										2nd	5th
GP NHK Trophy										5th	
GP Skate America											5th
GP Skate Canada										3rd	
Moscow News			7th								
Inter. de Paris/ Trophée de France				6th			2nd		2nd		
NHK Trophy				11th							
Skate America						5th			3rd		
Skate Canada				5th			3rd				
National
French Champ.	4th	5th	2nd	1st	1st	1st	1st	2nd	2nd	2nd	
WD: Withdrew
