= Pierre Béchu =

French ice dancer

Personal information
- Born: 10 March 1959 Bron, France
- Died: 24 August 1988 (aged 29)
- Height: 1.78 m (5 ft 10 in)

Figure skating career
- Country: France
- Retired: 1984

Pierre Béchu (10 March 1959 – 24 August 1988) was a French ice dancer. With Nathalie Hervé, he became a five-time French national champion, from 1980 to 1984. They placed eighth at the 1981 World Championships, fifth at the 1983 European Championships, and 14th at the 1984 Winter Olympics.

In August 1988, Hervé and Béchu were traveling with their daughter, Johanna, when their vehicle collided with another, killing Béchu and Johanna.

Early in his career, Béchu competed with Catherine Le Bail. They won bronze at the 1978 French Championships.

== Results ==
=== With Hervé ===
International
Event	1978–79	1979–80	1980–81	1981–82	1982–83	1983–84
Winter Olympics						14th
World Championships		12th	8th	11th	WD	
European Championships		11th	6th	6th	5th	8th
St. Gervais		2nd	2nd			
National
French Championships	2nd	1st	1st	1st	1st	1st
WD = Withdrew

=== With Le Bail ===
International: Junior
Event	1976-77	1977–78
World Junior Championships	5th	
National
French Championships		3rd
