= Anaïs Ventard =

French figure skater

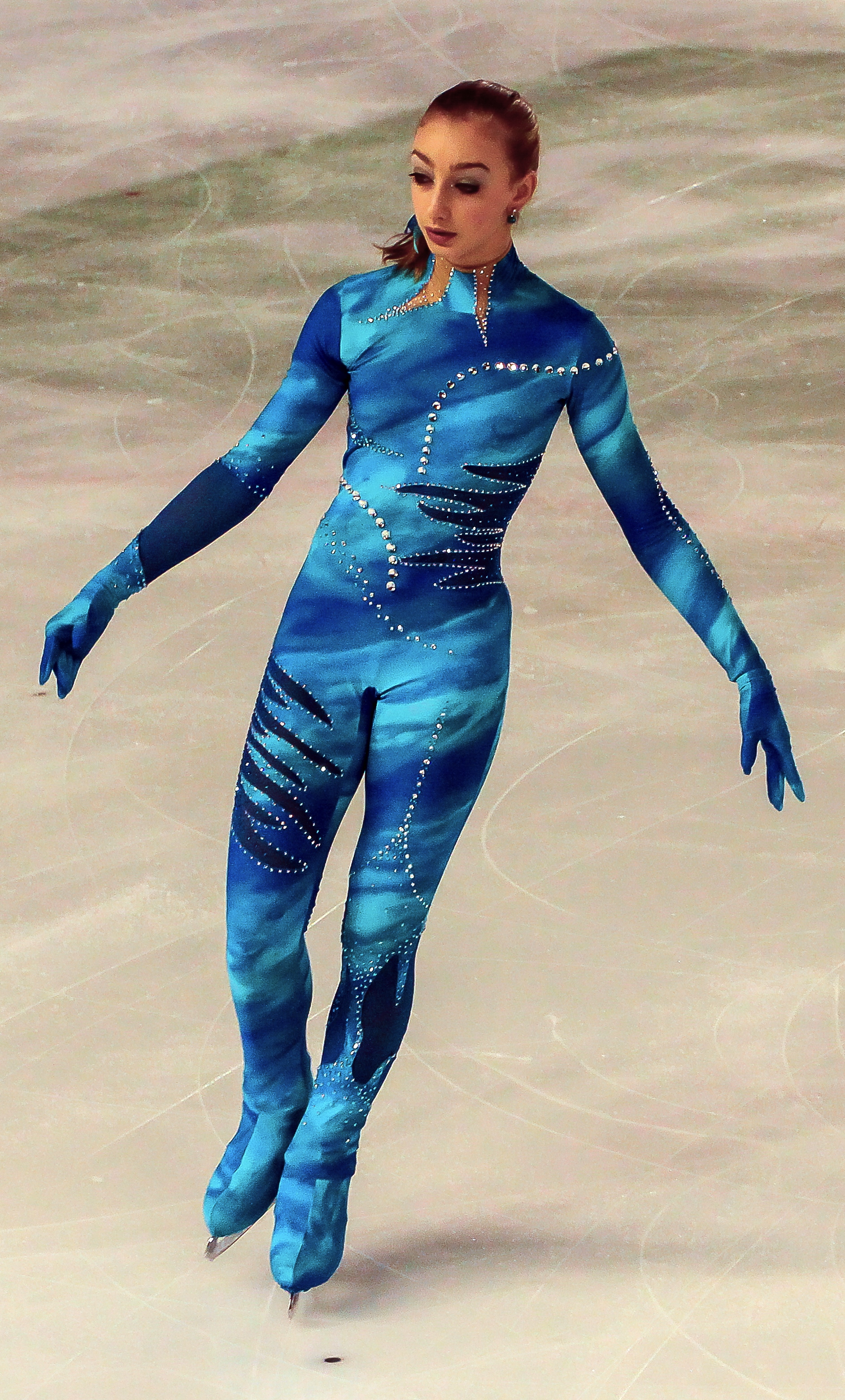
- Anaïs Ventard in December 2012

Personal information
- Born: 20 September 1996 (age 30) Sallanches, France
- Home town: Annecy, France
- Height: 1.60 m (5 ft 3 in)

Figure skating career
- Country: France
- Discipline: Women's singles
- Began skating: 2000

Medal record
French Championships
Gold medal – first place	2013 Strasbourg	Singles
Bronze medal – third place	2012 Dammarie-lès-Lys	Singles
Bronze medal – third place	2014 Vaujany	Singles

Anaïs Ventard (born 20 September 1996) is a French former figure skater. She is the 2013 Lombardia Trophy bronze medalist, 2014 Bavarian Open bronze medalist, and 2013 French national champion. She trains in Annecy.

== Programs ==
Season	Short program	Free skating
2014–15	Spanish Flame	Je me souviens
2012–14	El Tango de Roxanne (from Moulin Rouge!)	Avatar by James Horner

== Competitive highlights ==
GP: Grand Prix; CS: Challenger Series; JGP: Junior Grand Prix

International
Event	09–10	10–11	11–12	12–13	13–14	14–15
GP Bompard						WD
CS Lombardia						9th
Bavarian Open					3rd	13th
Cup of Nice					5th	12th
Lombardia					3rd	
Merano Cup						6th
Triglav Trophy			7th			
International: Junior
Junior Worlds					15th	
Youth Olympics			5th			
JGP Austria			8th			
JGP France		6th				
JGP Poland			8th			
JGP Romania		8th				
Bavarian Open				2nd J		
Cup of Nice		5th J	2nd J			
EYOF				2nd J		
Merano Cup		1st J	1st J	4th J		
Mont Blanc		1st J				
National
French Champ.	6th	5th	3rd	1st	3rd	6th
Masters	4th J	2nd J	1st J			3rd
J: Junior level; WD: Withdrew
