= Robert Dureville =

French figure skater

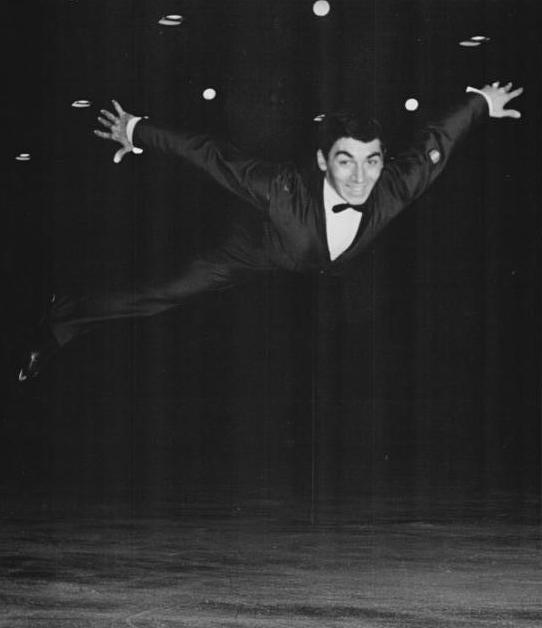
- Dureville in 1964

Personal information
- Full name: Robert Dureville
- Born: 26 November 1943 (age 82) Paris
- Height: 178 cm (5.84 ft)

Figure skating career
- Country: France

Robert Dureville (born 26 November 1943 in Paris) is a French figure skater. He is a six-time (1962–1967) French silver medalist. He represented France at the 1964 Winter Olympics, where he placed 17th.

== Competitive highlights ==
International
Event	1961	1962	1963	1964	1965	1966	1967
Winter Olympics				17th			
World Champ.		17th	12th	13th	10th	13th	10th
European Champ.		16th	11th	9th	6th	5th	6th
National
French Champ.	3rd	2nd	2nd	2nd	2nd	2nd	2nd
