= Nicolas Pétorin =

French figure skater

Personal information
- Born: 24 June 1972 (age 54) Niort, Deux-Sèvres

Figure skating career
- Country: France
- Skating club: CSG Champigny
- Retired: 1996

Nicolas Pétorin (born 24 June 1972) is a French former competitive figure skater. He is the 1991 World Junior bronze medalist, a two-time Nebelhorn Trophy silver medalist, and a four-time French national medalist. Pétorin competed at the 1992 Winter Olympics, placing 14th.

At an event in Sofia on 4 February 1988, Pétorin became the first French skater to land a triple Axel in international competition.

== Results ==
International
Event	87–88	88–89	89–90	90–91	91–92	92–93	93–94	94–95	95–96
Olympics					14th				
Europeans					6th				
GP Nations Cup									10th
GP Skate America									9th
GP Int. de Paris / Trophée de France		9th		6th	9th		6th	12th	
GP Skate Canada				9th	9th				
Nebelhorn				2nd	2nd				
Piruetten							7th		
Prague Skate			1st						
International: Junior
Junior Worlds		4th	7th	3rd					
National
French Champ.	4th	3rd	4th	3rd	2nd	3rd	4th	4th	6th
GP = Became part of Champions Series in 1995–96 season (renamed to Grand Prix in 1998–99)
