= Frédéric Lipka =

French former competitive figure skater (born 1968)

Personal information
- Born: 14 March 1968 (age 58)

Figure skating career
- Country: France
- Partner: Émilie Gras; Marie-Pierre Leray
- Coach: Didier Gailhaguet; Annick Dumont
- Retired: 1995

Frédéric Lipka (born 14 March 1968) is a French former competitive figure skater. Competing in men's singles, he won the 1988 French national title and placed 11th at the 1988 European Championships. He later competed in pair skating, winning the 1993 French national title with Marie-Pierre Leray.

After retiring from competition, he worked for TF1 and then in the insurance industry. As of April 2011, he is the director-general of Assurances Banque populaire prévoyance.

== Competitive highlights ==
=== Men's singles ===
International
Event	83–84	86–87	87–88	88–89	89–90	90–91	91–92
Worlds			23rd				
Europeans			11th				
Inter. de Paris				10th	5th	7th	
Skate Canada				10th			
Moscow News			5th				
International: Junior
Junior Worlds	9th						
National
French Champ.		6th	1st		6th	4th	WD
WD = Withdrew

=== Pairs with Leray and Gras ===
International
Event	1992–93	1994–95
Europeans	WD	
Trophée de France		7th
Skate Canada	5th	
National
French Champ.	1st	3rd
WD = Withdrew
