= Muriel Boucher-Zazoui =

French ice dancer

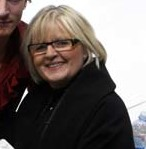
- Muriel Boucher-Zazoui at the 2007-2008 Grand Prix Final

Personal information
- Born: 1. Jan 1953

Figure skating career
- Country: France
- Retired: 1978

Muriel Boucher-Zazoui is a French coach and choreographer, and retired competitive ice dancer. She competed with Yves Malatier, and together they are the 1977 and 1978 French national champions. They competed twice at the European Championships, with the highest placement of 13th, which they achieved in 1978. They placed 15th at the 1978 World Championships.

She coaches in Lyon, France, often collaborating with Romain Haguenauer, who since 2014 has been based in Montreal, Canada. Her most successful former students include:

- Marina Anissina / Gwendal Peizerat
- Isabelle Delobel / Olivier Schoenfelder/
- Nathalie Péchalat / Fabian Bourzat
- Marie-France Dubreuil / Patrice Lauzon (This Canadian team are now coaches in Montreal.)
- Anna Cappellini / Luca Lanotte
- Pernelle Carron / Lloyd Jones
- Pernelle Carron / Mathieu Jost
- Gabriella Papadakis / Guillaume Cizeron

Other current and former students include:

- Lucie Myslivečková / Neil Brown
- Tiffany Zahorski / Alexis Miart
- Louise Walden / Owen Edwards
- Élodie Brouiller / Benoît Richaud
- Nakako Tsuzuki / Kenji Miyamoto
- Maureen Ibanez / Neil Brown
- Caroline Truong / Sylvain Longchambon
- Scarlett Rouzet / Lionel Rumi
- Laura Munana / Luke Munana
- Eve Bentley / Cedric Pernet
- Solene Pasztory / Andrew McCrary
- Pernelle Carron / Edouard Dezutter
- Magali Sauri / Michail Stifunin
- Amandine Borsi / Fabrice Blondel

== Results ==
(Ice dance with Yves Malatier)

International
Event	1971–72	1972–73	1973–74	1974–75	1975–76	1976–77	1977–78
Worlds							15th
Europeans						14th	13th
St. Gervais						2nd	2nd
National
French Champ.	3rd	3rd	1st	2nd	2nd	1st	1st
