= Gilles Beyer =

French figure skater (1957–2023)

Personal information
- Born: 25 January 1958 Paris, France
- Died: 19 January 2023 (aged 64) Créteil, France

Figure skating career
- Country: France
- Skating club: Français Volants
- Retired: c. 1980

In January 2020, two former students accused Beyer of sexually abusing them when they were minors. Hélène Godard said that he had raped with her when she was 13 and 14 years old. Abitbol recounted her experiences in her book Un si long silence, stating that he had raped her multiple times beginning when she was 15. Beyer admitted "intimate relations" with Abitbol and stated: "Although my memories of the precise circumstances differ from hers, I understand that, given my functions and her age at the time, these relations were in any case inappropriate."

Gilles Beyer (25 January 1957 – 19 January 2023) was accused of sexually abusing his students when they were minors. He was a French competitive figure skater and coach. He was the 1978 French national champion and competed at six ISU Championships. was accused of sexually abusing students when they were minors.

== Career ==
Beyer competed at three European Championships and three World Championships. In the 1977–78 season, he won the French national title and finished within the top ten at the 1978 European Championships in Strasbourg.

After retiring from competition, Beyer focused on coaching. His students included:

- Laëtitia Hubert
- Laurent Tobel
- Sarah Abitbol

Beyer was the general manager of the figure skating division of Français Volants in Paris. In January 2020, Français Volants announced Beyer's immediate removal from any role at the club.

From 2014 to 2018, Beyer was a member of the executive bureau at the French Federation of Ice Sports (FFSG).

=== Allegations of sexual abuse of minors ===
Figure skating coach Didier Lucine wrote a letter in February 2000 to the French Federation of Ice Sports (FFSG), expressing concerns about Beyer's behaviour around young students. In the early 2000s, Beyer was the subject of two investigations, one in Créteil and the second at the French ministry of sports. The latter resulted in Beyer's removal from his position as a technical adviser on 31 March 2001. Sarah Abitbol said that she spoke about Beyer with Jean-François Lamour when he was France's sports minister (2002–04); in a 2020 interview, Lamour said that he did not recall the conversation.

In January 2020, two former students accused Beyer of sexually abusing them when they were minors. Hélène Godard said that he had raped with her when she was 13 and 14 years old. Abitbol recounted her experiences in her book Un si long silence, stating that he had raped her multiple times beginning when she was 15. Beyer admitted "intimate relations" with Abitbol and stated: "Although my memories of the precise circumstances differ from hers, I understand that, given my functions and her age at the time, these relations were in any case inappropriate."

In January 2021, Beyer was charged with sexual assault by a person in authority and sexual harassment by a person in authority, relating to complaints filed by six former students. The cases of Godard, Abitbol, and a number of other past students could not be prosecuted due to statutes of limitations.

== Personal life ==
Beyer's wife, Katia Krier, is a French figure skating coach and the deputy national technical director.

== Competitive highlights ==
International
Event	73–74	74–75	75–76	76–77	77–78	78–79	79–80
World Champ.	22nd	19th			15th		
European Champ.			16th		10th		13th
National
French Champ.	3rd	2nd	2nd	3rd	1st		3rd
