= Joëlle Cartaux =

French figure skater

Joëlle Cartaux is a former French figure skater who competed in ladies singles. She is the 1969-71 French champion.

== Results ==
International
Event	66–67	67–68	68–69	69–70	70–71	71–72
World Champ.					21st	
European Champ.				WD		
Prague Skate	10th					
National
French Champ.		3rd	1st	1st	1st	2nd
WD = Withdrew
