= Didier Courtois =

French ice dancer

Personal information
- Born: 3 August 1967 (age 58)

Figure skating career
- Country: France
- Retired: 1988

Didier Courtois (born 3 August 1967) is a former ice dancer who represented France. With partner Corinne Paliard, he is the 1986 World Junior bronze medalist and 1988 French national champion. They placed 10th at the 1988 European Championships and 14th at the 1988 Winter Olympics.

== Competitive highlights ==
(with Paliard)

International
Event	1983–84	1984–85	1985–86	1986–87	1987–88
Winter Olympics					14th
European Champ.				11th	10th
International de Paris					3rd
NHK Trophy					6th
Karl Schäfer Memorial					3rd
International: Junior
World Junior Champ.	9th		3rd		
National
French Champ.				2nd	1st
