= André Malinet =

French figure skater

Personal information
- Nationality: French
- Born: 28 June 1877 Épernay, France
- Died: 20 May 1956 (aged 78) Paris, France

Sport
- Sport: Figure skating

André Henri Malinet (28 June 1877 – 20 May 1956) was a French figure skater. He competed in the men's singles event at the 1924 Winter Olympics.
