= Florence Cahn =

French figure skater

Florence Cahn (born 27 October 1954) is a French former figure skater who competed in pairs.

With partner Jean-Pierre Rondel, Cahn finished second at the French Figure Skating Championships in 1968 and 1969. She then teamed with Jean-Roland Racle and won four straight national championships from 1971 to 1974. The pair also competed in the 1972 Winter Olympics, finishing 13th.
