= Jean-Christophe Simond =

French figure skater and coach

Personal information
- Full name: Jean-Christophe Simond
- Born: 29 April 1960 (age 66) Les Contamines-Montjoie
- Height: 1.75 m (5 ft 9 in)

Figure skating career
- Country: France
- Skating club: CSG Saint-Gervais
Medal record
Representing France
Men's Figure skating
European Championships
Silver medal – second place	1982 Lyon	Men's singles
Silver medal – second place	1981 Innsbruck	Men's singles

Jean-Christophe Simond (born 29 April 1960 in Les Contamines-Montjoie) is a French figure skater and coach. He is a two-time European silver medalist and an eight-time French national champion. During his competitive career, he was well known for his excellent school figures. He coached 2007 World Champion Brian Joubert between 2006 and March 2009.

== Competitive highlights ==
International
Event	74–75	75–76	76–77	77–78	78–79	79–80	80–81	81–82	82–83	83–84
Olympics		15th				7th				6th
Worlds			15th		7th	13th	5th	5th	5th	
Europeans	16th	13th			4th	6th	2nd	2nd	6th	WD
NHK Trophy								3rd		
Prague Skate			3rd		1st					
St. Gervais	3rd	3rd								
National
French Champ.	3rd	1st	1st		1st	1st	1st	1st	1st	1st
