= Marie-Pierre Leray =

French figure skater

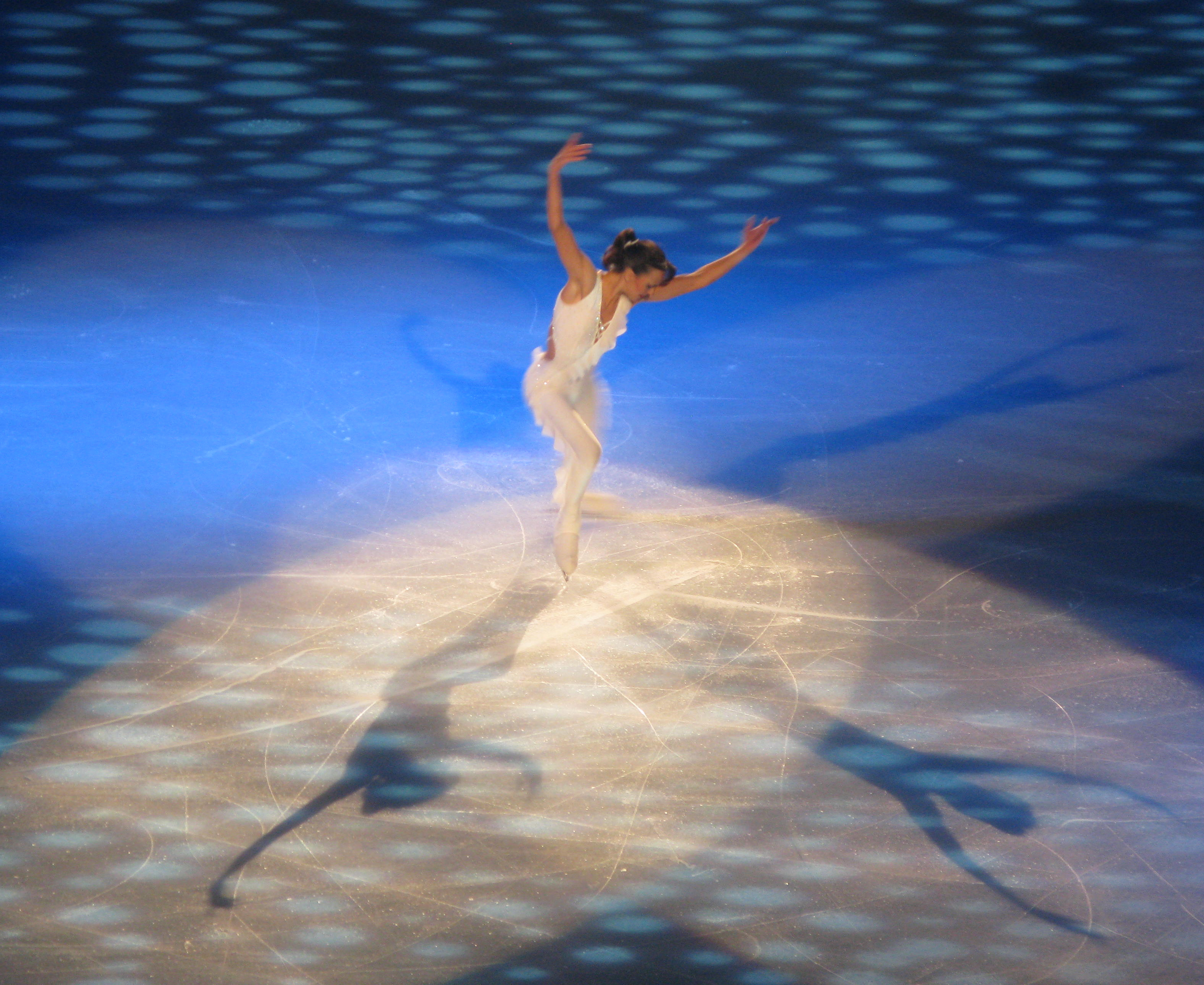

Personal information
- Born: 17 February 1975 (age 51) Villecresnes, France
- Height: 1.67 m (5 ft 5 1/2 in)

Figure skating career
- Country: France
- Began skating: 1985
- Retired: 2002

Marie-Pierre Leray (born 17 February 1975) is a French former competitive figure skater. In ladies' singles, she placed seventh at the 1994 World Championships and 14th at the 1994 Winter Olympics. As a pair skater, she won the 1993 French national title with Frédéric Lipka. She later teamed up with Nicolas Osseland. During her competitive career as an eligible skater, she also worked as a model. She continues to perform in ice shows throughout Europe, combining circus elements with skating.

== Results ==
=== Ladies' singles ===
International
Event	1990–91	1991–92	1992–93	1993–94	1994–95	1995–96	1996–97	1997–98
Winter Olympics				14th				
World Champ.			11th	7th	8th			17th
European Champ.		7th	9th	12th	WD			
GP Nations Cup	6th							
GP Trophée de France					4th	9th		
International: Junior
World Junior Champ.			4th					
National
French Champ.		3rd	2nd	2nd	2nd			4th
GP = Became part of Champions Series (Grand Prix) in 1995–96 season; WD = Withdrew

=== Pairs with Osseland ===
International
Event	2000–01	2001–02
European Championships		9th
GP Sparkassen Cup		9th
GP Trophée Lalique		7th
Golden Spin of Zagreb	3rd	
Winter Universiade	4th	
National
French Championships	3rd	2nd
GP = Grand Prix

=== Pairs with Lipka ===
National
Event	1992–93
French Championships	1st
