= Pierre-Loup Bouquet =

French ice dancer (born 1987)

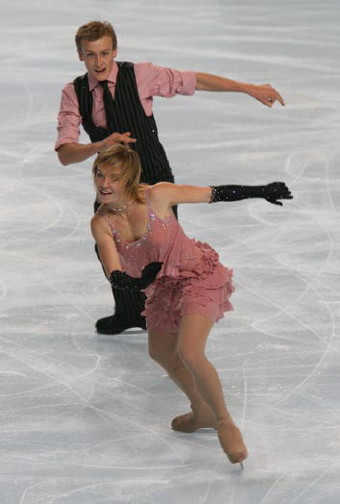
- Blanc and Bouquet at the 2008 Trophée Eric Bompard

Personal information
- Born: 24 March 1987 (age 39) Beuvry, France
- Home town: Villard-de-Lans
- Height: 1.78 m (5 ft 10 in)

Figure skating career
- Country: France
- Skating club: Villars de Lans SG Ice Dance
- Retired: 2011

Pierre-Loup Bouquet (born 24 March 1987) is a French former competitive ice dancer. With Zoé Blanc, he is a three-time French national medalist and placed 14th at the 2010 European Championships. They retired from competition in 2011. Bouquet has worked as a choreographer.

== Programs ==
(with Blanc)

Season	Short dance	Free dance
2010–2011	Romantic Waltz by Karl Jenkins; Quickstep	L'Enfant Qui Voulait Etre Un Ours by Bruno Coulais
	Original dance	
2009–2010	Medieval Breton dance: La Jument de Michao by Tri Yann	Marine Machine by Amon Tobin; Ramalama Bang Bang by Roisin Murphy
2008–2009	Black & Blues by Louis Armstrong	It's a Man's World by Sekouba Bambino; Chercheur d'Or by Grand Corp Malade
2007–2008	Shantala (Hindi folk dance)	Kill Bill (soundtrack) by various artists; Ca me vexe by Mademoiselle K
2006–2007	Tango Agrapendo by La Chicanna	This is a Man's World by Sekouba Bambino

== Results ==
(with Blanc)

Results
International
Event	2004–05	2005–06	2006–07	2007–08	2008–09	2009–10	2010–11
Worlds					19th		
Europeans						14th	
GP Cup of Russia					10th		
GP Skate America						9th	
GP Trophee Bompard						10th	
Coupe de Nice							6th
Karl Schafer					7th		
NRW Trophy						4th	
Pavel Roman	3rd J.	7th				5th	
Universiade					8th		7th
International: Junior
JGP France			10th				
JGP Poland		11th					
JGP Romania			6th				
JGP Slovakia		13th					
National
French Champ.	3rd J.			3rd	4th	2nd	3rd
GP = Grand Prix; JGP = Junior Grand Prix; J. = Junior level
