= Thierry Cerez =

French former competitive figure skater

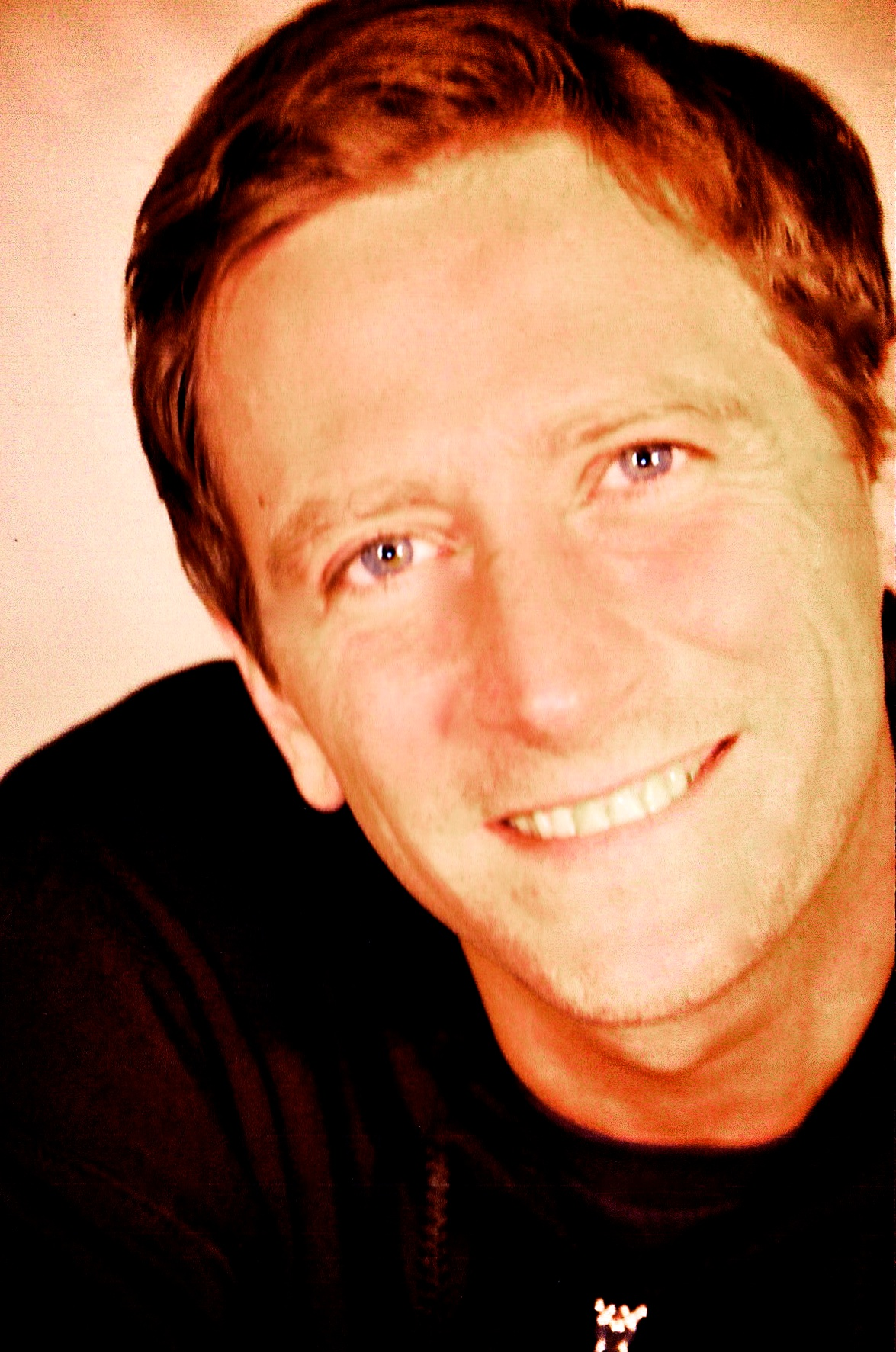
- Thierry Cerez in 2012

Personal information
- Born: 11 June 1976 (age 50) Évry, Essonne, France
- Height: 1.77 m (5 ft 9 1/2 in)

Figure skating career
- Country: France
- Coach: Andre Brunet
- Skating club: Franconville Sport Club
- Began skating: 1984
- Retired: 2002

Thierry Cerez (born 11 June 1976) is a French former competitive figure skater. He is the 1995 World Junior silver medalist and the 1998 French national champion. His highest placement at the European Championships, 14th, came in 1994 and 1998, while his best result at the World Championships, 12th, came in 1996.

== Programs ==
Season	Short program	Free skating
1998–99		Lawrence of Arabia by Maurice Jarre

== Results ==
GP: Champions Series / Grand Prix

International
Event	91–92	92–93	93–94	94–95	95–96	96–97	97–98	98–99	99–00	00–01	01–02
Worlds				16th	12th						
Europeans			14th			19th	14th				
GP Cup of Russia						10th					
GP Trophée de France/Lalique					8th	4th					
GP NHK Trophy							5th				
GP Skate Canada					12th	7th					
Crystal Skate											2nd
Finlandia Trophy					6th	5th					
Golden Spin											10th
Inter. de Paris			7th								
Nebelhorn Trophy			7th								
Nepela Memorial				2nd					1st		
Piruetten					1st						
Schäfer Memorial		4th	6th								
Skate Canada				7th							
St. Gervais				1st							
Penta Cup		1st									
Sofia Cup			2nd								
Tallinn Cup								4th			
International: Junior
Junior Worlds			17th	2nd							
EYOF		2nd									
Piruetten	4th J										
National
French Champ.			3rd	3rd	3rd	2nd	1st	3rd	4th		4th
J: Junior level; WD: Withdrew
