= Nicolas Osseland =

French pair skater

Personal information
- Born: 22 August 1978 (age 47) Laxou, France
- Height: 1.82 m (5 ft 11 1/2 in)

Figure skating career
- Country: France
- Began skating: 1982
- Retired: 2002

Nicolas Osseland (born 22 August 1978) is a French former pair skater. With Sabrina Lefrançois, he placed fourth at the 1997 World Junior Championships, 12th at the 1997 European Championships, and 17th at the 1998 Winter Olympics. He later competed with Marie-Pierre Leray.

Following his retirement from competition, he began coaching in Luxembourg.

== Results ==
=== With Lefrançois ===
International
Event	1995–96	1996–97	1997–98
Winter Olympics			17th
European Champ.		12th	
International: Junior
World Junior Champ.		4th	5th
JGP Slovakia			2nd
Blue Swords		3rd J.	
National
French Champ.	4th	WD	
J. = Junior level; JGP = Junior Series (Junior Grand Prix); WD = Withdrew

=== With Leray ===
International
Event	2000–01	2001–02
European Championships		9th
GP Sparkassen Cup		9th
GP Trophée Lalique		7th
Golden Spin of Zagreb	3rd	
Winter Universiade	4th	
National
French Championships	3rd	2nd
GP = Grand Prix
