= Gaby Clericetti =

French figure skater

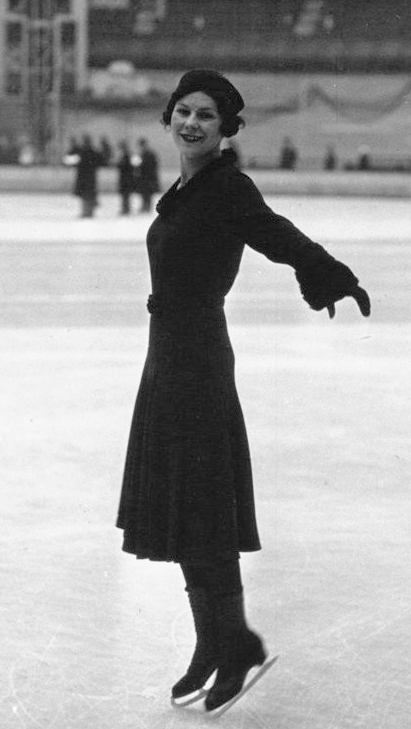
- Clericetti at the European Championships in 1932

Figure skating career
- Country: France

Gaby Clericetti was a French figure skater who competed in ladies singles. She was the 1931-36 French champion.

== Results ==
Event	1931	1932	1933	1934	1935	1936
World Championships						14th
European Championships		8th			15th	
French Championships	1st	1st	1st	1st	1st	1st
