= Maïa Mazzara =

French figure skater

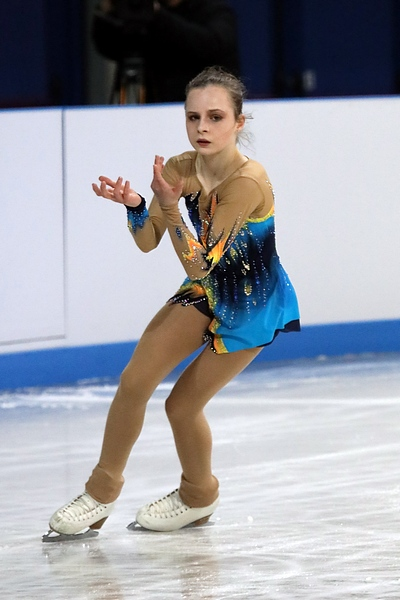
- Maïa Mazzara at the 2018 World Junior Championships

Personal information
- Born: 5 August 2003 (age 23) Clamart, France
- Home town: Grenoble, France
- Height: 1.57 m (5 ft 2 in)

Figure skating career
- Country: France (since 2019); Switzerland (2017–19)
- Discipline: Women's singles
- Coach: Françoise Bonnard
- Skating club: Grenoble Isère Métropole Patinage
- Began skating: 2011

Medal record
Representing France
French Championships
Silver medal – second place	2020 Dunkirk	Singles
Silver medal – second place	2021 Vaujany	Singles
Bronze medal – third place	2023 Rouen	Singles

Maïa Mazzara (born 5 August 2003) is a French figure skater who currently represents France in women's singles and formerly represented Switzerland. She is a two-time French national silver medalist.

On the junior level, she is the 2019 French junior national champion, the 2019 Master's de Patinage champion, and placed 9th at the 2016 Winter Youth Olympics.

Representing Switzerland on the junior level, she is the 2017 Merano Cup silver medalist and the 2017 Swiss junior national champion.

== Career ==
=== Early years ===
Mazzara began learning how to skate in 2011 at the age of seven. She started her skating career competing for her native France at the pre-novice level in 2014, but by 2016 had begun representing Switzerland.

=== 2017–18 season: Junior international debut ===
Mazzara made her international junior debut for Switzerland in November 2017 at the Cup of Nice, where she finished 11th overall. Later in the same month, Mazzara won the silver medal in the junior-level ladies event at the Merano Cup in Italy. In January 2018, Mazzara won her first and only Swiss junior national title and was assigned to compete at the 2018 World Junior Championships. There, Mazzara finished 35th in the short program and thus did not advance to the free skate.

=== 2018–19 season ===
In August 2018, Mazzara made her ISU Junior Grand Prix debut at the 2018 JGP Slovakia in Bratislava, where she finished tenth. This was her only international assignment of the season. Later in the season, Mazzara competed under the Swiss flag as a guest at the 2019 French Championships, finishing seventh at the senior level and second at the junior level. She did not compete at the Swiss Championships.

=== 2019–20 season: Senior international debut ===
Mazzara returned to representing France in 2019, now coached by Florent Amodio and Françoise Bonnard in Vaujany, France, after the passing of her former coach Jean-François Ballester in late 2018. She began her season by placing first in the junior ladies event at the French test competition, Master's de Patinage, and received two Junior Grand Prix assignments: 2019 JGP Russia and 2019 JGP Italy. Mazzara placed 20th and ninth at these events, respectively.

After her junior events, Mazzara made her first senior start at the 2019 Tallinn Trophy, where she finished fifth and later competed at the 2019 CS Golden Spin of Zagreb, her first Challenger event, where she finished ninth. In December 2019, 16-year-old Mazzara won the silver medal behind reigning French champion Maé-Bérénice Méité at the 2020 French Championships. Due to her placement at the event, Mazzara was named to the French team for the 2020 European Championships.

In January 2020, Mazzara returned to junior-level competition at the 2020 Winter Youth Olympics. She finished ninth overall and set new personal bests in all three segments, surpassing her previous best total score by nearly seven points. Making her debut at the senior 2020 European Championships, Mazzara placed eleventh and then finished the season with a seventeenth-place finish at the 2020 World Junior Championships.

=== 2020–21 season ===
Mazzara was scheduled to make her Grand Prix debut at the 2020 Internationaux de France, but the event was cancelled as a result of the COVID-19 pandemic. She instead opened her season in early November in Minsk at the 2020 Winter Star where she placed fifth in the short program and third in the free skate to win the bronze medal overall. In February, she won her second straight silver medal at Nationals. Mazzara was part of the French team for the 2021 World Team Trophy, where she finished eleventh in both segments while Team France finished fifth.

=== 2021–22 season ===
Mazzara began the season at the 2021 CS Lombardia Trophy, where she finished fourteenth, four ordinals, and fourteen points below fellow Frenchwoman Léa Serna. As a result, Serna was substituted for Mazzara as France's entry at the 2021 CS Nebelhorn Trophy, the Olympic qualifier. She went on to finish sixth at the 2021 CS Golden Spin of Zagreb, fourth at the French championships, and sixth at the International Challenge Cup.

=== 2022–23 season ===
After finishing seventh at the 2022 CS Nepela Memorial, Mazzara was at last able to make her Grand Prix debut with a twelfth-place result at the 2022 Grand Prix de France. She later came twenty-second at the 2022 CS Warsaw Cup, and was assigned to represent France at the 2023 Winter World University Games. She was eighteenth there.

=== 2023–24 season ===
Mazzara began the season by winning bronze at the 2023 Master's de Patinage. She made one appearance on the Challenger circuit early in the season, finishing nineteenth at the 2023 CS Budapest Trophy. She was then eleventh at the 2023 Grand Prix de France.

Mazzara finished the season with a twenty-seventh place finish at the 2023 CS Warsaw Cup.

=== 2024–25 season ===
Mazzara started the season by finishing fourteenth at the 2024 CS Lombardia Trophy.

== Programs ==
Season	Short program	Free skating	Exhibition
2024–2025	I Got You (I Feel Good) by James Brown performed by Jessie J choreo. by Kévin Aymoz	The Last Temptation of Christ by Peter Gabriel arranged by Maxime Rodriguez; Le ballet des momies arranged by Maxime Rodriguez choreo. by Kévin Aymoz	
2023–2024	Rise Like a Phoenix by Conchita Wurst arranged by Maxime Rodriguez choreo. by Kévin Aymoz	The Last Temptation of Christ by Peter Gabriel arranged by Maxime Rodriguez; Le ballet des momies arranged by Maxime Rodriguez choreo. by Kévin Aymoz	
2022–2023	You? by Two Feet choreo. by Benoît Richaud	Salem's Secret by Peter Gundry; Demimonde (from Penny Dreadful) by Abel Korzeniowski; Paint It Black performed by Ciara choreo. by Benoît Richaud	
2021–2022	You? by Two Feet choreo. by Benoît Richaud	Salem's Secret by Peter Gundry; Demimonde (from Penny Dreadful) by Abel Korzeniowski; Paint It Black performed by Ciara choreo. by Benoît Richaud	
2020–2021	Je vole performed by Louane choreo. by Benoît Richaud	Cum Dederit (from Home) by Armand Amar choreo. by Benoît Richaud	
2019–2020	Rox Tango (El Tango de Roxanne) (from Moulin Rouge!) performed by Dirty Bros.	Beethoven's Silence by Ernesto Cortázar II	Chandelier; Bird Set Free by Sia
2018–2019	City Hunter (soundtrack) by Tasumi Yano	Down by Marian Hill	
2017–2018	Violin Concerto No. 1 by Philip Glass	Kvold i Borginni by Misha Mishenko	

== Competitive highlights ==
GP: Grand Prix; CS: Challenger Series; JGP: Junior Grand Prix

=== For France ===
International
Event	19–20	20–21	21–22	22–23	23–24	24–25
Europeans	11th					
GP France		C	WD	12th	11th	WD
CS Budapest Trophy					19th	
CS Denis Ten Memorial			WD			
CS Golden Spin	9th		6th			21st
CS Lombardia			14th			14th
CS Nebelhorn			WD		WD	
CS Nepela Memorial				7th		
CS Warsaw Cup		C		22nd	27th	
Bosphorus Cup					WD	
Challenge Cup		WD	6th			
Coupe du Printemps			4th			
Cup of Nice				3rd		
Ice Star		WD				
Tallinn Trophy	5th					
Tallink Hotels Cup		6th				
University Games				18th		
Winter Star		3rd				
International: Junior
Youth Olympics	9th					
Junior Worlds	16th					
JGP Italy	9th					
JGP Russia	20th					
National
French Champ.	2nd	2nd	4th	3rd		5th
French Junior	1st					
Masters	1st J		1st	3rd	3rd	
Team events
World Team Trophy		5th T 11th P				
TBD = Assigned; WD = Withdrew; C = Event cancelled Levels: J = Junior; T = Team result; P = Personal result. Medals awarded for team result only.

=== For Switzerland ===
International: Junior
Event	2017–18	2018–19
Junior Worlds	35th	
JGP Slovakia		10th
Bavarian Open	6th	
Cup of Nice	11th	
Merano Cup	2nd	
National
Masters		2nd J
Swiss Champ.	1st J	
Levels: J = Junior

== Detailed results ==
=== For France ===
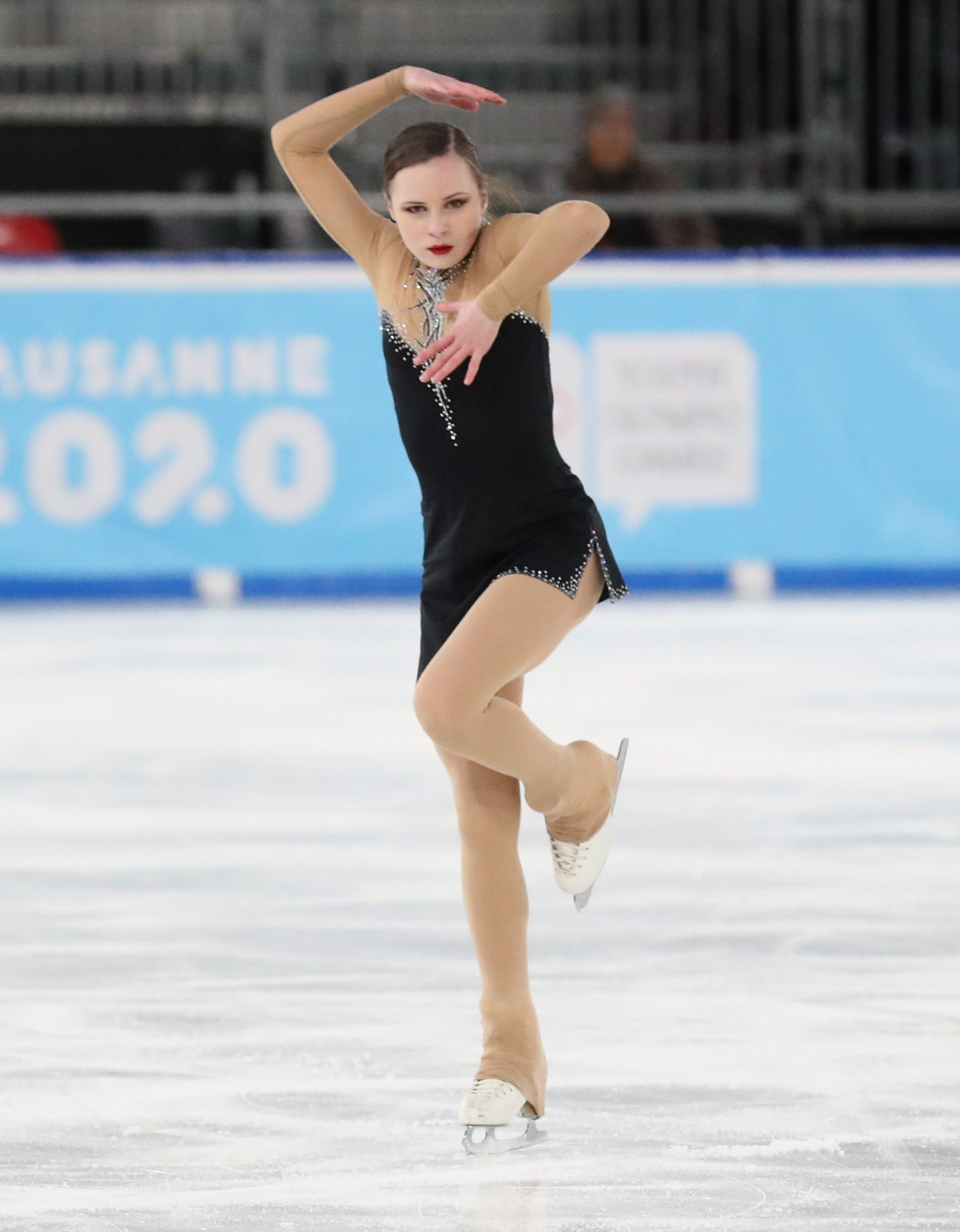
Mazzara at the 2020 Winter Youth Olympics

2024–25 season
Date	Event	SP	FS	Total
September 13–15, 2024	2024 CS Lombardia Trophy	14; 44.56	14; 82.13	14; 126.69
2023–24 season
Date	Event	SP	FS	Total
November 3–5, 2023	2023 Grand Prix de France	11; 45.03	11; 92.41	11; 137.44
October 13–15, 2023	2023 CS Budapest Trophy	25; 42.31	12; 95.22	19; 137.53
September 28–30, 2023	2023 Master's de Patinage	5; 43.66	3; 95.54	3; 139.20
2022–23 season
Date	Event	SP	FS	Total
January 13–15, 2023	2023 Winter Universiade	18; 48.93	17; 84.29	18; 133.22
December 15–17, 2022	2023 French Championships	4; 51.49	3; 111.72	3; 163.21
November 17–20, 2022	2022 CS Warsaw Cup	16; 47.03	24; 65.93	22; 112.96
November 4–6, 2022	2022 Grand Prix de France	12; 46.05	12; 94.80	12; 140.85
October 6–8, 2022	2022 Master's de Patinage	2; 60.03	3; 103.97	3; 164.00
September 29–October 1, 2022	2022 CS Nepela Memorial	7; 45.10	9; 89.94	7; 135.04
2021–22 season
Date	Event	SP	FS	Total
February 24–27, 2022	2022 Challenge Cup	7; 51.88	6; 103.48	6; 155.36
December 16–18, 2021	2021 French Championships	5; 53.12	4; 98.56	4; 151.68
December 7–11, 2021	2021 CS Golden Spin of Zagreb	13; 50.39	4; 112.40	6; 162.79
September 30-October 2, 2021	2021 Master's de Patinage	1; 50.31	1; 104.84	1; 155.15
September 10–12, 2021	2021 CS Lombardia Trophy	10; 52.39	15; 90.18	14; 142.57
2020–21 season
Date	Event	SP	FS	Total
April 15–18, 2021	2021 World Team Trophy	11; 55.31	11; 100.11	5T/11P; 155.42
February 19–21, 2021	2021 Tallink Hotels Cup	9; 48.63	7; 95.67	6; 144.30
February 5–6, 2021	2020 French Championships	2; 60.96	2; 102.81	2; 163.77
December 11–13, 2020	2020 Winter Star	5; 51.79	3; 96.86	3; 148.65

2019–20 season
March 2–8, 2020	2020 World Junior Championships	Junior	15; 54.22	17; 95.58	16; 149.80
January 20–26, 2020	2020 European Championships	Senior	16; 57.11	8; 112.95	11; 170.06
January 10–15, 2020	2020 Winter Youth Olympics – Team	Junior	–	4; 103.36	8T/4P
January 10–15, 2020	2020 Winter Youth Olympics	Junior	8; 59.48	9; 106.68	9; 166.16
December 19–21, 2019	2019 French Championships	Senior	3; 56.06	2; 103.91	2; 159.97
December 4–7, 2019	2019 CS Golden Spin of Zagreb	Senior	20; 45.94	8; 106.31	9; 152.25
November 11–17, 2019	2019 Tallinn Trophy	Senior	8; 49.52	7; 99.25	5; 148.77
October 2–5, 2019	2019 JGP Italy	Junior	8; 53.81	9; 96.28	9; 150.09
September 26–28, 2019	2019 Master's de Patinage	Junior	1; 56.34	1; 106.31	1; 162.65
September 11–14, 2019	2019 JGP Russia	Junior	20; 42.90	21; 74.63	20; 117.53

=== For Switzerland ===
2018–19 season
Date	Event	Level	SP	FS	Total
February 22–24, 2019	2019 French Junior Championships	Junior	2; 49.51	1; 100.60	2; 150.11
December 13–15, 2018	2018 French Championships	Senior	6; 49.27	7; 75.95	7; 125.22
August 22–25, 2018	2018 JGP Slovakia	Junior	10; 51.39	10; 88.20	10; 139.59
2017–18 season
March 5–11, 2018	2018 World Junior Championships	Junior	35; 40.69	–	35; 40.69
January 26–31, 2018	2018 Bavarian Open	Junior	10; 44.76	4; 93.48	6; 138.24
January 6–7, 2018	2018 Swiss Junior Championships	Junior	1; 53.92	1; 86.24	1; 140.16
November 15–19, 2017	2017 Merano Cup	Junior	5; 44.53	2; 91.75	2; 136.28
October 11–15, 2017	2017 Cup of Nice	Junior	14; 43.20	9; 84.16	11; 127.36
