= 2022 Grand Prix de France =

Figure skating competition

- Type: Grand Prix
- Date: November 4 – 6
- Season: 2022–23
- Location: Angers, France
- Host: Fédération Française des Sports de Glace
- Venue: Angers IceParc

Champions
- Men's singles: (France) Adam Siao Him Fa
- Women's singles: (Belgium) Loena Hendrickx
- Pairs: (Canada) Deanna Stellato-Dudek / Maxime Deschamps
- Ice dance: (Italy) Charlène Guignard / Marco Fabbri
- Previous: 2021 Internationaux de France
- Next: 2023 Grand Prix de France
- Previous Grand Prix: 2022 Skate Canada International
- Next Grand Prix: 2022 MK John Wilson Trophy

The 2022 Grand Prix de France was the third event of the 2022–23 ISU Grand Prix of Figure Skating: a senior-level international invitational competition series. It was held at the Angers IceParc in Angers from November 4–6. Medals were awarded in men's singles, women's singles, pair skating, and ice dance. Skaters earned points toward qualifying for the 2022–23 Grand Prix Final.

== Entries ==
The International Skating Union announced the preliminary assignments on July 22, 2022.

Country	Men	Women	Pairs	Ice dance
Austria		Olga Mikutina		
Belgium		Loena Hendrickx		
Canada	Wesley Chiu		Deanna Stellato-Dudek / Maxime Deschamps	Laurence Fournier Beaudry / Nikolaj Sørensen; Molly Lanaghan / Dmitre Razgulajevs
Estonia	Mihhail Selevko			
Finland				Juulia Turkkila / Matthias Versluis
France	Luc Economides; Landry Le May; Adam Siao Him Fa	Maïa Mazzara; Maé-Bérénice Méité; Léa Serna	Camille Kovalev / Pavel Kovalev; Océane Piegad / Denys Strekalin	Loïcia Demougeot / Théo Le Mercier; Marie Dupayage / Thomas Nabais; Evgeniia Lopareva / Geoffrey Brissaud
Georgia	Nika Egadze		Karina Safina / Luka Berulava	Maria Kazakova / Georgy Reviya
Germany			Annika Hocke / Robert Kunkel	
Italy			Rebecca Ghilardi / Filippo Ambrosini	Charlène Guignard / Marco Fabbri
Japan	Sena Miyake; Kazuki Tomono; Sōta Yamamoto	Mana Kawabe; Rino Matsuike; Rion Sumiyoshi		
Netherlands		Lindsay Van Zundert		
South Korea	Lee Si-hyeong	Kim Ye-lim; Lee Hae-in		
Switzerland	Lukas Britschgi			
Ukraine	Ivan Shmuratko			
United States		Audrey Shin	Maria Mokhova / Ivan Mokhov	Eva Pate / Logan Bye; Katarina Wolfkostin / Jeffrey Chen

== Changes to preliminary assignments ==
Discipline	Withdrew		Added		Notes	Ref.
Discipline	Date	Skater(s)	Date	Skater(s)	Notes	Ref.
Ice dance	August 12	(Ukraine) Oleksandra Nazarova / Maxim Nikitin	August 19	(Georgia (country)) Maria Kazakova / Georgy Reviya	Nazarova & Nikitin retired.	
Men	—N/a		September 15	(France) Luc Economides	Host picks	
Women	—N/a		September 15	(France) Maé-Bérénice Méité	Host picks	
Pairs	—N/a		September 15	(France) Aurelie Faula / Theo Belle	Host picks	
Ice dance	—N/a		September 15	(France) Marie Dupayage / Thomas Nabais	Host picks	
Men	October 7	(Czech Republic) Georgii Reshtenko	October 11	(Georgia (country)) Nika Egadze		
Men	October 14	(Japan) Yuma Kagiyama	October 14	(Japan) Sena Miyake	Injury	
Pairs	October 18	(France) Aurelie Faula / Theo Belle	October 21	(United States) Maria Mokhova / Ivan Mokhov		
Men	October 24	(Kazakhstan) Mikhail Shaidorov	October 25	(Switzerland) Lukas Britschgi		
Pairs	October 26	(China) Peng Cheng / Jin Yang	—N/a		Injury (Jin)	
Men	October 28	(France) Kévin Aymoz	October 28	(France) Landry Le May	Injury	

== Results ==
=== Men's singles ===
Rank	Skater	Nation	Total points	SP		FS	
1st place, gold medalist(s)	Adam Siao Him Fa	France	268.98	3	88.00	1	180.98
2nd place, silver medalist(s)	Sōta Yamamoto	Japan	257.90	1	92.42	3	165.48
3rd place, bronze medalist(s)	Kazuki Tomono	Japan	248.77	2	89.46	4	159.31
4	Lee Si-hyeong	South Korea	242.62	7	76.54	2	166.08
5	Nika Egadze	Georgia	233.40	4	82.44	6	150.96
6	Luc Economides	France	229.64	6	77.23	5	152.41
7	Lukas Britschgi	Switzerland	222.86	9	74.25	7	148.61
8	Ivan Shmuratko	Ukraine	220.08	8	75.95	8	144.13
9	Mihhail Selevko	Estonia	212.92	5	79.40	11	133.52
10	Wesley Chiu	Canada	209.95	11	67.95	10	142.00
11	Landry Le May	France	203.39	12	60.87	9	142.52
WD	Sena Miyake	Japan	withdrew	10	69.27	withdrew from competition	

=== Women's singles ===
Rank	Skater	Nation	Total points	SP		FS	
1st place, gold medalist(s)	Loena Hendrickx	Belgium	216.34	1	72.75	1	143.59
2nd place, silver medalist(s)	Kim Ye-lim	South Korea	194.76	2	68.93	4	125.83
3rd place, bronze medalist(s)	Rion Sumiyoshi	Japan	194.34	5	64.10	3	130.24
4	Lee Hae-in	South Korea	193.49	6	62.77	2	130.72
5	Audrey Shin	United States	183.93	4	64.27	5	119.66
6	Mana Kawabe	Japan	182.50	3	68.83	8	113.67
7	Rino Matsuike	Japan	176.52	9	57.68	6	118.84
8	Maé-Bérénice Méité	France	175.68	8	58.84	7	116.84
9	Lea Serna	France	167.89	7	62.23	9	105.26
10	Olga Mikutina	Austria	159.99	10	56.00	10	103.99
11	Lindsay van Zundert	Netherlands	154.09	11	55.11	11	98.98
12	Maïa Mazzara	France	140.85	12	46.05	12	94.80

=== Pairs ===
Rank	Team	Nation	Total points	SP		FS	
1st place, gold medalist(s)	Deanna Stellato-Dudek / Maxime Deschamps	Canada	185.84	1	64.33	1	121.51
2nd place, silver medalist(s)	Camille Kovalev / Pavel Kovalev	France	179.85	2	63.98	3	115.87
3rd place, bronze medalist(s)	Annika Hocke / Robert Kunkel	Germany	179.73	5	60.11	2	119.62
4	Rebecca Ghilardi / Filippo Ambrosini	Italy	174.72	4	60.93	4	113.79
5	Karina Safina / Luka Berulava	Georgia	162.44	3	61.55	6	100.89
6	Maria Mokhova / Ivan Mokhov	United States	162.16	6	54.77	5	107.39
7	Océane Piegad / Denys Strekalin	France	144.71	7	50.13	7	94.58

=== Ice dance ===
Rank	Team	Nation	Total points	RD		FD	
1st place, gold medalist(s)	Charlène Guignard / Marco Fabbri	Italy	207.95	1	83.52	1	124.43
2nd place, silver medalist(s)	Laurence Fournier Beaudry / Nikolaj Sørensen	Canada	201.93	2	82.38	2	119.55
3rd place, bronze medalist(s)	Evgeniia Lopareva / Geoffrey Brissaud	France	187.15	3	73.17	3	113.98
4	Loïcia Demougeot / Théo Le Mercier	France	179.76	4	70.76	4	109.00
5	Eva Pate / Logan Bye	United States	174.03	5	69.46	6	104.57
6	Maria Kazakova / Georgy Reviya	Georgia	173.05	6	68.84	7	104.21
7	Juulia Turkkila / Matthias Versluis	Finland	172.48	8	63.85	5	108.63
8	Katarina Wolfkostin / Jeffrey Chen	United States	164.89	7	64.18	8	100.71
9	Marie Dupayage / Thomas Nabais	France	161.09	9	63.64	9	97.45
10	Molly Lanaghan / Dmitre Razgulajevs	Canada	153.72	10	60.78	10	92.94
