= Léa Serna =

French figure skater (born 1999)

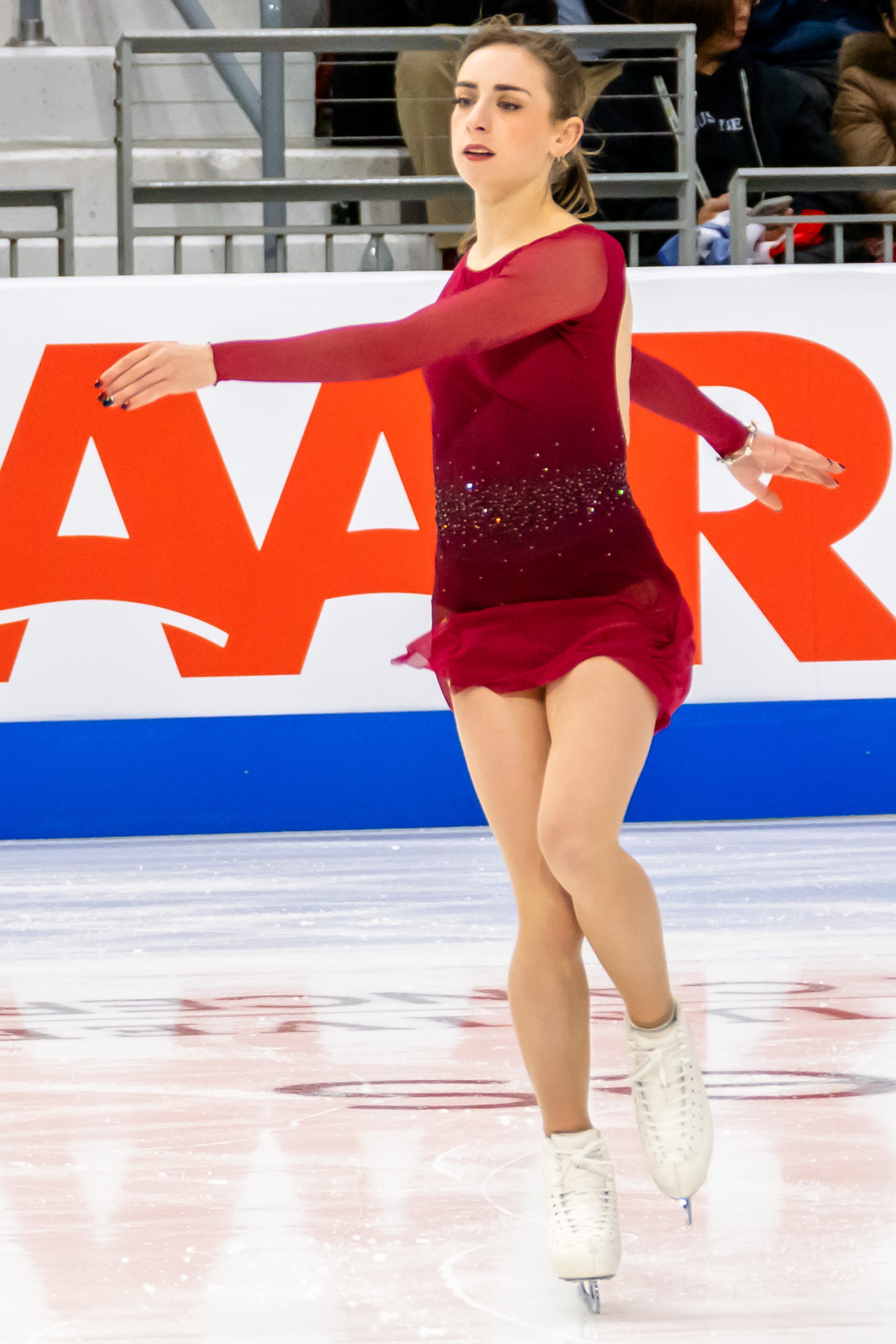
- Serna during her free skate at 2025 Skate America

Personal information
- Born: 31 October 1999 (age 26) Aubagne, France
- Home town: Oberstdorf, Germany
- Height: 1.63 m (5 ft 4 in)

Figure skating career
- Country: France
- Discipline: Women's singles
- Coach: Michael Huth; Nicole Schott
- Skating club: Paris Français Volants
- Began skating: 2007

Medal record
French Championships
Gold medal – first place	2021 Vaujany	Singles
Gold medal – first place	2022 Cergy-Pontoise	Singles
Gold medal – first place	2023 Rouen	Singles
Silver medal – second place	2025 Annecy	Singles
Bronze medal – third place	2015 Megève	Singles
Bronze medal – third place	2018 Nantes	Singles
Bronze medal – third place	2020 Dunkirk	Singles
Bronze medal – third place	2024 Vaujany	Singles
Bronze medal – third place	2026 Briancon	Singles

Léa Serna (born 31 October 1999) is a French figure skater. She is the 2023 CS Budapest Trophy silver medalist, a two-time International Cup of Nice champion, and a three-time French national champion (2021–23).

== Personal life ==
Serna was born on October 31, 1999, in Aubagne, Provence-Alpes-Côte d'Azur, France.

== Career ==
=== Early career ===
Serna began learning to skate in 2007. Her first coach was François Guestault. She debuted as a novice skater at the 2014 Triglav Trophy. The following year, she won the 2013 French Novice Championships.

=== 2013–14 season: Junior Grand Prix debut ===
Prior to the season, Serna began training at the SG Annecy in Annecy, France, where Didier Lucine, Claudie Lucine, and Sophie Gollaz became her new coaches.

In September 2013, she debuted on the 2013–14 ISU Junior Grand Prix circuit, competing at 2013 JGP Slovakia and finishing eighteenth. Going on to compete at the 2013 Master's de Patinage, Serna won the bronze medal on the junior level. She then placed sixth and ninth on the junior level at the 2013 Cup of Nice and 2013 Merano Cup, respectively.

At the 2014 French Championships, Serna finished ninth on the senior level and sixth on the junior level.

=== 2014–15 season ===
Serna started the season by winning gold on the junior level at the 2014 Master's de Patinage. Going on to compete on the 2014–15 ISU Junior Grand Prix circuit, Serna would place seventeenth at 2014 JGP Croatia. She subsequently won silver on the junior level at the 2014 Merano Cup.

At the 2015 French Championships, Serna won the bronze medal on the senior level. Selected to compete at the European Youth Olympic Winter Festival in January, she won the bronze medal. One month later, Serna won silver at the 2015 French Junior Championships.

In March, she competed at the 2015 World Junior Championships in Tallinn, Estonia; she qualified for the free skate and finished twentieth overall.

Serna would miss the 2015–16 figure skating season due to tendinitis in the patellar ligament.

=== 2016–17 season: Return to competition ===
Making her return to competition, Serna began competing on the senior level. She began the season by winning bronze at the 2016 Master's de Patinage before going on to finish twenty-seventh at the 2016 Golden Bear of Zagreb and tenth at the 2016 Merano Cup. Debuting on the ISU Challenger Series, Serna would place twelfth at the 2016 CS Warsaw Cup. In December, she finished fifth at the 2017 French Championships.

She ended her season by finishing tenth and fourth at the 2017 Coupe du Printemps and the 2017 Egna Spring Trophy, respectively.

=== 2017–18 season ===
Serna started the season by finishing ninth at the 2017 Slovenia Open before going on to win bronze at the 2017 Master's de Patinage.

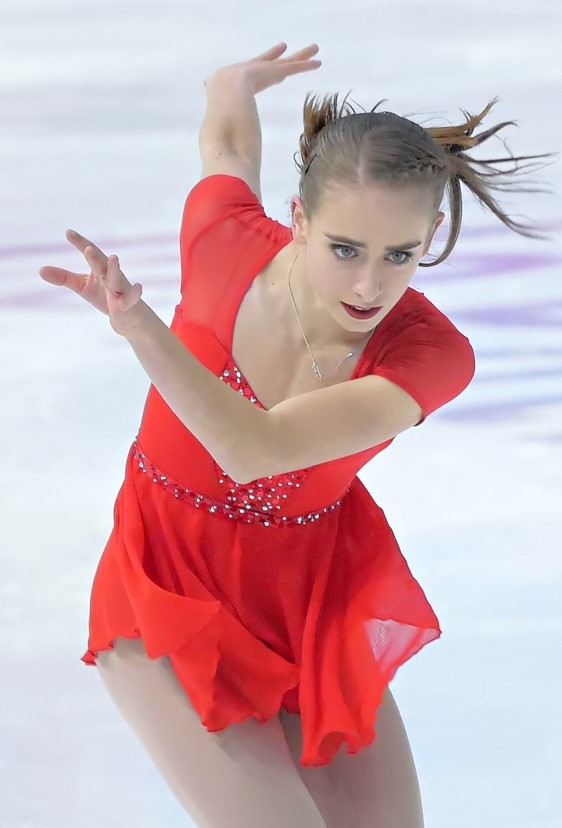
Serna at the 2018 Internationaux de France

In October 2017, she won her first senior international medal, a silver at the Denkova-Staviski Cup in Sofia, Bulgaria. She then won bronze at the 2018 French Championships and gold at the 2018 French Junior Championships. Between the national events, Serna competed on the junior level at the 2019 Mentor Toruń Cup, taking the silver medal.

Selected to compete at the 2018 World Junior Championships in Sofia, Serna placed thirty-eighth in the short program and did not advance to the free skate segment of the competition.

=== 2018–19 season ===
Beginning the season at the 2018 CS Lombardia Trophy, Serna would finish twelfth. She then went on to take bronze at the Master's de Patinage for a third consecutive year. The following month, Serna won silver at the Ice Star before placing fifth at the 2018 Volvo Open Cup.

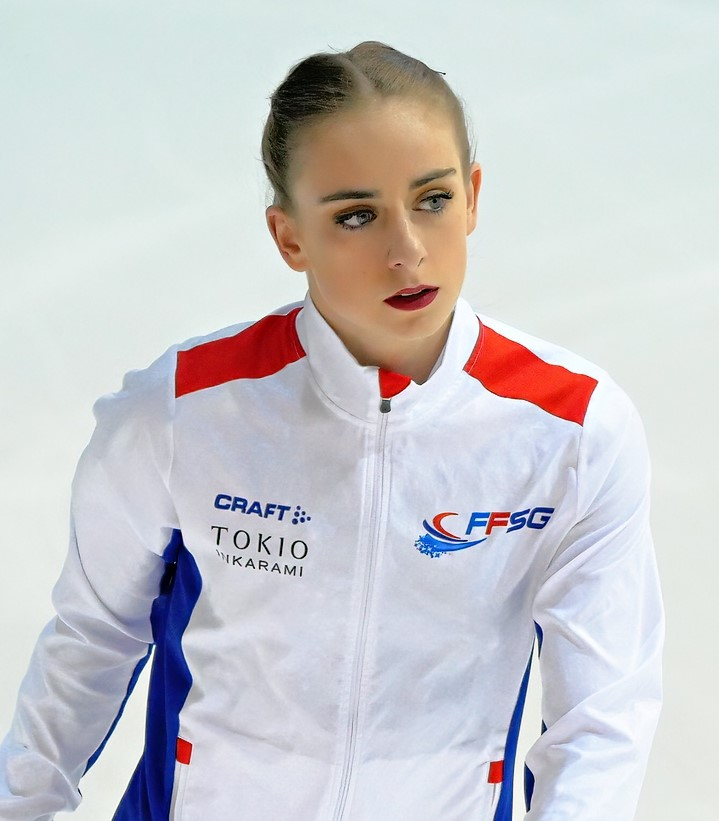
Serna at the 2019 Internationaux de France

Her Grand Prix debut came in November at the 2018 Internationaux de France, where she placed eleventh. She then competed at the 2019 French Championships, where she finished fourth.

In January 2019, it was announced that Serna had begun training in Poitiers, where Brian Joubert became her new coach. The following month, she would compete on the junior level at the 2019 Dragon Trophy, where she took the bronze medal. Serna would then close the season by finishing fourth at the 2019 French Junior Championships.

=== 2019–20 season: European Championship debut ===
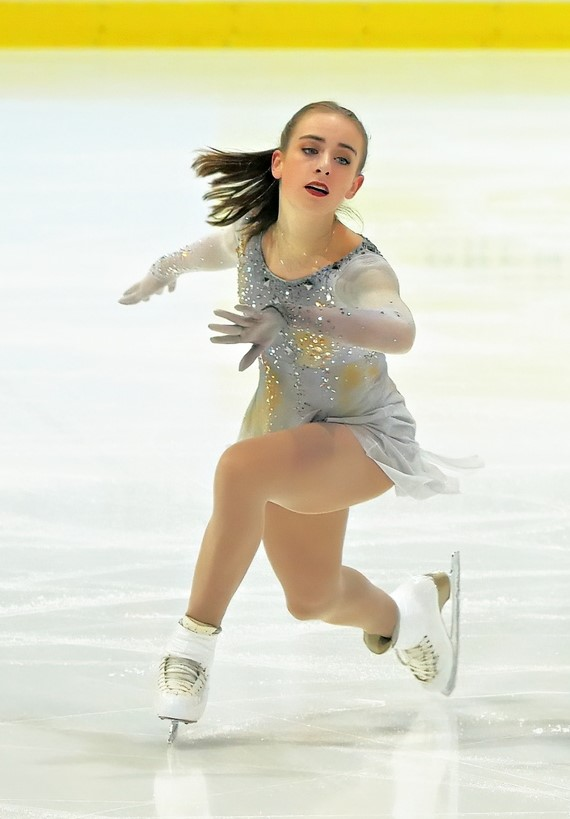
Serna performing her free skate at the 2019 Internationaux de France

Serna started the season with a third-place finish at the 2021 Master's de Patinage. She would then compete at the 2019 CS Ice Star, where she placed twelfth. In November, Serna competed at the 2019 Internationaux de France, where she finished eighth. Two weeks later, Serna would place eighth at the 2019 Tallinn Trophy.

At the 2020 French Championships in December, Serna won the bronze medal. Selected to compete at the 2020 European Championships in Graz, Austria, Serna came in sixteenth.

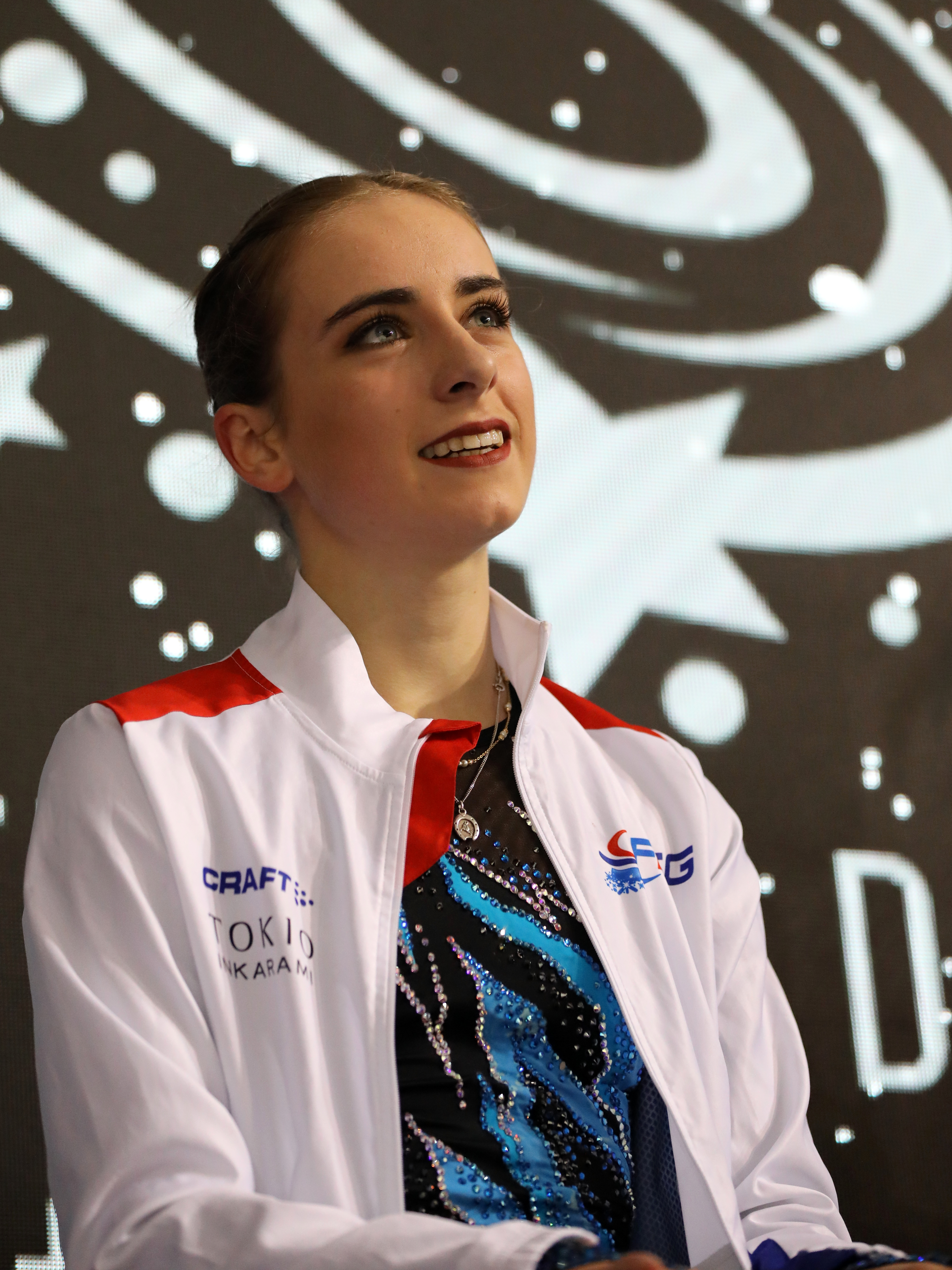
Serna at the 2019 Internationaux de France

=== 2020–21 season ===
Serna's first competition of the season was at the 2020 Master's de Patinage in October, where she won the event for the first time on the senior level. In February, Serna would win her first national title at the 2021 French Championships before finishing eighth at the 2021 Tallink Hotels Cup one week later.

Selected to compete at the 2021 World Team Trophy, Serna placed twelfth in the ladies' singles event and Team France would finish in fifth place overall.

=== 2021–22 season: World Championship debut ===
Serna began the season by finishing tenth at the 2021 CS Lombardia Trophy.

Due to Maé-Bérénice Méité being forced to withdraw from the 2021 World Championships due to injury, there were no berths for French women to compete at the 2022 Winter Olympics in the women's singles event. As a result, Serna competed at the 2021 CS Nebelhorn Trophy, the final Olympic qualifying event, however, she failed to finish in the top five and secure an Olympic qualification. She would place fourteenth at the event overall.

Serna would go on to winning silver at the 2021 Master's de Patinage, gold at the 2021 Cup of Nice, and silver at the 2021 NRW Trophy. Competing on the 2021–22 Grand Prix circuit, Serna finished eleventh at the 2021 Internationaux de France.

At the 2022 French Championships, Serna won her second national title. Selected to compete at the 2022 European Championships in Tallinn, Estonia, Serna finished twelfth. Two months later, Serna competed at the 2022 World Championships in Montpellier, France. She would place twenty-ninth in the short program, failing to advance to the free skate segment.

=== 2022–23 season ===
Serna started the season by winning silver at the 2022 Master's de Patinage and gold at the 2022 Cup of Nice. Going on to compete at the 2022 Grand Prix de France and the 2022 CS Warsaw Cup, Serna would finish ninth and fifth, respectively.

Serna won gold at the 2023 French Championships for a third time. Selected to compete at the 2023 European Championships in Espoo, Finland, Serna placed twenty-sixth in the short program and did not advance to the free skate segment of the competition. Three months later, Serna was invited to compete at the 2023 World Team Trophy where she placed eighth in the women's individual event and Team France would finish fifth overall.

=== 2023–24 season ===
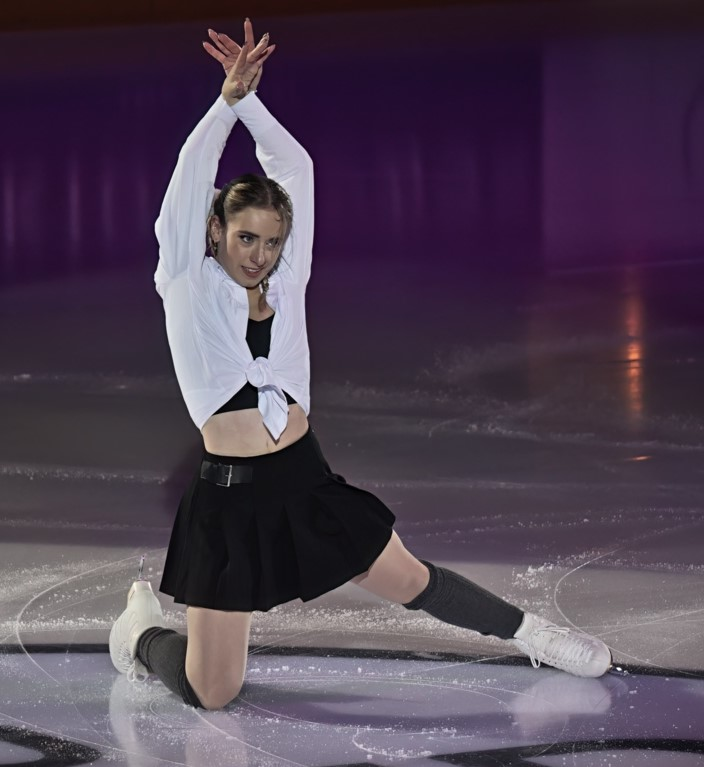
Serna performing her exhibition program at the 2023 Grand Prix de France

In summer 2023, Serna moved her training base to Oberstdorf to train under Michael Huth. She began the season by winning gold at the 2023 Master's de Patinage.

In her first international competition with her new coaches, she won her first ISU Challenger Series medal, a silver, at the 2023 CS Budapest Trophy. On the Grand Prix, she achieved a new best finish with seventh place at the 2023 Grand Prix de France before going on to finish eleventh at the 2023 NHK Trophy. Between these two events, Serna competed at the 2023 CS Warsaw Cup, finishing fourth.

At the 2024 French Championships, Serna took the bronze medal behind Lorine Schild and Stefania Gladki. Although Serna was initially announced as the French representative for the women's singles event at the 2024 World Championships while Lorine Schild would be given the sole berth to compete at the 2024 European Championships, however, following Schild's strong fifth-place finish at the Europeans, the Fédération Française des Sports de Glace announced that Schild would compete at the World Championships instead of Serna.

Going on to compete at the 2024 Bavarian Open, Serna finished fifth. She would then close the season by winning the 2024 Merano Cup.

=== 2024–25 season ===
Serna chose the music for her free skate because she felt it allowed her to express any emotions she felt on a particular day. She noted that it went against the common convention in figure skating of women skating to songs sung by women rather than men.

She intended to compete at the 2024 Master's de Patinage at the beginning of the season; however, she tore a ligament in her ankle and did not participate. Serna continued training with a reduced load under the advice of doctors and struggled with her jumps and stamina in the first half of the season due to the injury and its effect on her training.

Serna began the season by competing 2024–25 Grand Prix series. She finished eleventh at 2024 Skate America and the 2024 Grand Prix de France. Going on to compete on the 2024–25 ISU Challenger Series, Serna finished seventh at the 2024 CS Tallinn Trophy, eighth at the 2024 CS Warsaw Cup, and fourth 2024 CS Golden Spin of Zagreb.

In late December, Serna won the silver medal at the 2025 French Championships behind Stefania Gladki. The following month, she won the gold medal at the 2025 Bavarian Open and placed eleventh at the 2025 European Championships.

Selected to compete at the Road to 26 Trophy in Milan, a test event for the 2026 Winter Olympics, Serna finished the competition in fourth place. Subsequently, she competed for Team France at the 2025 World Team Trophy, where she placed ninth in the women's singles event and Team France would finish in fourth place overall.

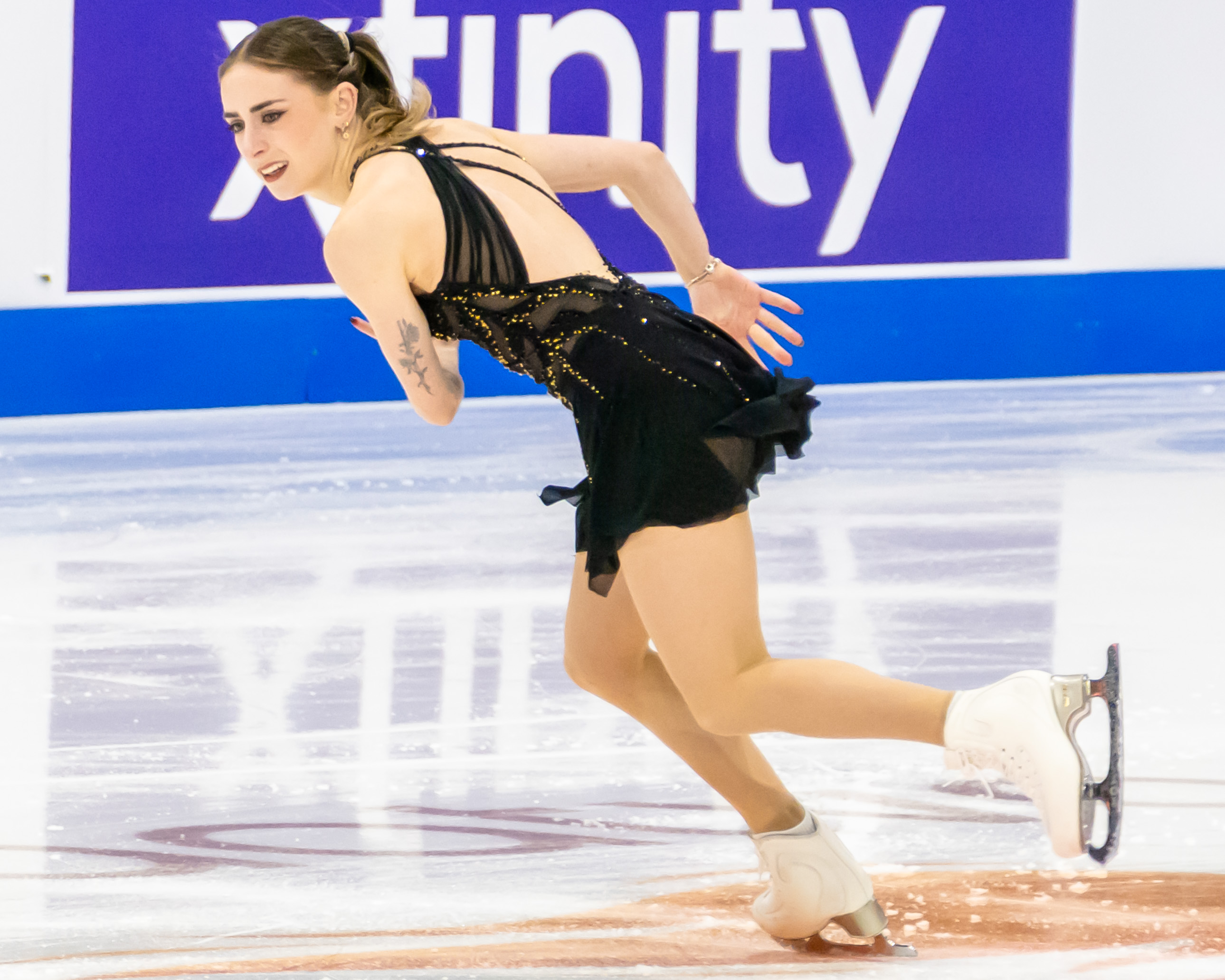
Serna performing her short program at the 2025 Skate America

=== 2025–26 season ===
Serna opened the season by winning silver at the 2025 Master's de Patinage and finishing seventh at the 2025 CS Nebelhorn Trophy. She followed this up by winning gold at the 2025 Trophée Métropole Nice Côte d'Azur. Going on to compete on the 2025–26 Grand Prix series, Serna finished tenth at the 2025 Grand Prix de France and seventh at 2025 Skate America. Between the two events, Serna won the bronze medal at the 2025 Swiss Open.

In December, following a sixth-place finish at the 2025 CS Golden Spin of Zagreb, Serna competed at the 2026 French Championships, winning the bronze medal behind Stefania Gladki and Lorine Schild. The following month, Serna competed at the 2026 European Championships in Sheffield, England, United Kingdom, finishing in fifteenth place.

== Programs ==
Season	Short program	Free skating	Exhibition
2025–2026	"Girl with One Eye" by Florence and the Machine choreo. by Kévin Aymoz, Andrea Vaturi	"Hymne à l'amour" by Édith Piaf performed by Chimène Badi choreo. by Kévin Aymoz, Andrea Vaturi	
2024–2025	"Tourner Dans Le Vide" by Indila choreo. by Nicole Schott	"Exogenesis: Symphony Part 2"; "Uprising" by Muse choreo. by Gabriella Papadakis	
2023–2024	"I am Fire" by J2, Eivør choreo. by Thomas Rochelet	"Padam, padam..."; "The 9th Hour Prelude" by Patricia Kaas choreo. by Thomas Rochelet	
2022–2023	Kill Bill; "Bang Bang (My Baby Shot Me Down)" performed by Nico Vega; "Don't Let Me Be Misunderstood" by Santa Esmeralda choreo. by Thomas Rochelet	"Sadness Part II" by Enigma arranged and choreo. by Adam Solya	"Vinegar & Salt" by Hooverphonic
2021–2022	Kill Bill; "Bang Bang (My Baby Shot Me Down)" performed by Nico Vega; "Don't Let Me Be Misunderstood" by Santa Esmeralda choreo. by Anna Novichkina & Romain Gazave	"La terre vue du ciel" by Armand Amar; "Dawn of Faith" by Eternal Eclipse choreo. by Anna Novichkina & Romain Gazave	
2020–2021	"Experience" by Ludovico Einaudi choreo. by Laurie May	"Young and Beautiful" by Lana Del Rey choreo. by Mahil Chantelauze	
2019–2020	"Experience" by Ludovico Einaudi choreo. by Laurie May	"Light of the Seven" (from Game of Thrones) by Ramin Djawadi choreo. by Laurie May	
2018–2019	"Bohemian Rhapsody" by Queen performed by Lou Mai	La La Land by Justin Hurwitz	
2017–2018	"Creep" by Radiohead performed by Scott Bradlee's Postmodern Jukebox ft. Haley Reinhart	La La Land by Justin Hurwitz	"Creep" by Radiohead performed by Scott Bradlee's Postmodern Jukebox ft. Haley Reinhart
2016–2017	"Creep" by Radiohead performed by Scott Bradlee's Postmodern Jukebox ft. Haley Reinhart	"I Put a Spell on You" by Screamin' Jay Hawkins performed by Annie Lennox	
2014–2015	Les Choristes by Bruno Coulais	"Indigene"	
2013–2014	"Cruella"	Music by The Puppini Sisters	

== Competitive highlights ==
- GP – Event of the ISU Grand Prix Series
- JGP – Event of the ISU Junior Grand Prix Series
- CS – Event of the ISU Challenger Series
- TBD – Assigned
- WD – Withdrew from competition
- Medals at team events are awarded for the team results only. Individual placements at team events are listed in parentheses.

Competition placements at senior level
Season	2013–14	2014–15	2016–17	2017–18	2018–19	2019–20	2020–21	2021–22	2022–23	2023–24	2024–25	2025–26
World Championships								29th				
European Championships						16th		11th	26th		11th	15th
French Championships	9th	3rd	5th	3rd	4th	3rd	1st	1st	1st	3rd	2nd	3rd
World Team Trophy							5th (12th)		5th (8th)		4th (9th)	
GP France					11th	8th		11th	9th	7th	11th	10th
GP NHK Trophy										11th		
GP Skate America											11th	7th
CS Budapest Trophy										2nd		
CS Golden Spin of Zagreb											4th	6th
CS Ice Star						12th						
CS Lombardia Trophy					12th			10th				
CS Nebelhorn Trophy								14th				7th
CS Tallinn Trophy						8th					7th	
CS Warsaw Cup			12th						5th	4th	8th	
Bavarian Open										5th		
Coupe du Printemps			10th									
Denkova-Staviski Cup				2nd								
Egna Spring Trophy			4th									
Golden Bear of Zagreb			27th									
Ice Star					2nd							
Master's de Patinage			3rd	3rd	3rd	3rd	1st	2nd	2nd	1st		2nd
Merano Cup			10th									
Merano Ice Trophy										1st		
NRW Trophy								2nd				
Road to 26 Trophy											4th	
Slovenia Open				9th								
Tallink Hotels Cup							12th					
Trophée Métropole Nice								1st	1st			1st
Volvo Open Cup					5th							

Competition placements at junior level
Season	2013–14	2014–15	2017–18	2018–19
World Junior Championships		20th	38th	
French Championships	6th	2nd	1st	4th
JGP Croatia		17th		
JGP Slovakia	18th			
Cup of Nice	6th			
Dragon Trophy				3rd
European Youth Olympic Festival		3rd		
Master's de Patinage	3rd	1st		
Mentor Cup			2nd	
Merano Cup	9th	2nd		

== Detailed Results ==
ISU personal best scores in the +5/-5 GOE System
Segment	Type	Score	Event
Total	TSS	181.55	2024 CS Golden Spin of Zagreb
Short program	TSS	64.81	2024 CS Golden Spin of Zagreb
Short program	TES	35.56	2025 CS Nebelhorn Trophy
Short program	PCS	29.73	2024 CS Golden Spin of Zagreb
Free skating	TSS	122.02	2023 Grand Prix de France
Free skating	TES	66.91	2023 Grand Prix de France
Free skating	PCS	58.47	2023 CS Budapest Trophy

=== Senior results ===
Results in the 2021–22 season
Date	Event	SP		FS		Total	
Date	Event	P	Score	P	Score	P	Score
Sep 10–12, 2021	(Italy) 2021 CS Lombardia Trophy	14	51.36	9	105.30	10	156.66
Sep 22–25, 2021	(Germany) 2021 CS Nebelhorn Trophy	14	50.93	15	95.59	14	146.52
Sep 30 – Oct 2, 2021	(France) 2021 Master's de Patinage	2	49.42	2	102.44	2	151.86
Oct 20–24, 2021	(France) 2021 Trophée Métropole Nice Côte d'Azur	1	66.12	1	122.74	1	188.86
Nov 4–7, 2021	(Germany) 2021 NRW Trophy	1	59.89	2	102.05	2	161.94
Nov 19–21, 2021	2021 Internationaux de France	9	62.75	11	107.58	11	170.33
Dec 16–18, 2021	(France) 2022 French Championships	1	62.13	1	118.88	1	181.01
Jan 10–16, 2022	(Estonia) 2022 European Championships	10	62.16	13	108.84	12	171.00
Mar 21–27, 2022	(France) 2022 World Championships	29	54.30	—N/a	—N/a	29	54.30

Results in the 2022–23 season
Date	Event	SP		FS		Total	
Date	Event	P	Score	P	Score	P	Score
Oct 6–8, 2022	(France) 2022 Master's de Patinage	1	60.16	2	119.27	2	179.43
Oct 19–23, 2022	(France) 2022 Trophée Métropole Nice Côte d'Azur	1	62.82	3	100.16	1	162.98
Nov 4–6, 2022	2022 Grand Prix de France	7	62.63	9	105.26	9	167.89
Nov 17–20, 2022	(Poland) 2022 CS Warsaw Cup	9	51.41	5	112.19	5	163.60
Dec 15–17, 2022	(France) 2023 French Championships	1	62.39	1	119.53	1	181.92
Jan 25–29, 2023	(Finland) 2023 European Championships	26	43.93	-	-	26	43.93
Apr 13–16, 2023	(Japan) 2023 World Team Trophy	8	60.18	7	117.54	8 (5)	177.72

Results in the 2023–24 season
Date	Event	SP		FS		Total	
Date	Event	P	Score	P	Score	P	Score
Sep 28–30, 2023	(France) 2023 Master's de Patinage	1	66.62	2	118.73	1	185.35
Oct 13–15, 2023	(Hungary) 2023 CS Budapest Trophy	4	62.58	2	115.98	2	178.56
Nov 3–5, 2023	2023 Grand Prix de France	8	58.785	6	122.02	7	180.77
Nov 16–19, 2023	(Poland) 2023 CS Warsaw Cup	5	58.23	4	116.36	4	174.59
Nov 24–26, 2023	(Japan) 2023 NHK Trophy	9	56.85	10	99.19	11	156.04
Dec 10–14, 2023	(France) 2023 French Championships	3	59.65	4	123.16	3	182.81
Jan 30 – Feb 4, 2024	(Germany) 2024 Bavarian Open	5	53.51	7	100.01	5	153.52
Feb 22–25, 2024	(Italy) 2024 Merano Cup	2	56.78	1	117.03	1	173.81

Results in the 2024–25 season
Date	Event	SP		FS		Total	
Date	Event	P	Score	P	Score	P	Score
Oct 18–20, 2024	(United States) 2024 Skate America	12	42.85	10	109.02	11	151.87
Nov 1–3, 2024	2024 Grand Prix de France	11	54.78	11	106.13	11	160.91
Nov 11–17, 2024	(Estonia) 2024 CS Tallinn Trophy	7	50.73	7	96.36	7	147.09
Dec 5–7, 2024	(Croatia) 2024 CS Golden Spin of Zagreb	4	64.81	4	116.74	4	181.55
Jan 28 – Feb 2, 2025	(Estonia) 2025 European Championships	17	50.33	7	113.37	11	163.70
Feb 18–20, 2025	(Italy) Road to 26 Trophy	3	64.31	4	121.30	4	185.61
Apr 17–20, 2025	(Japan) 2025 World Team Trophy	11	57.68	9	106.65	4 (9)	164.33

Results in the 2025–26 season
Date	Event	SP		FS		Total	
Date	Event	P	Score	P	Score	P	Score
Aug 28–30, 2025	(France) 2025 Master's de Patinage	1	64.94	2	102.48	2	167.42
Sep 25–27, 2025	(Germany) 2025 CS Nebelhorn Trophy	6	63.88	7	104.70	7	168.58
Oct 1–5, 2025	(France) 2025 Trophée Métropole Nice Côte d'Azur	1	55.12	1	122.26	1	177.38
Oct 17–19, 2025	2025 Grand Prix de France	9	57.06	10	107.73	10	164.78
Nov 14–16, 2025	(United States) 2025 Skate America	9	59.25	7	115.80	7	175.05
Dec 3–6, 2025	(Croatia) 2025 CS Golden Spin of Zagreb	3	60.75	7	111.18	6	171.93
Dec 18–20, 2025	(France) 2026 French Championships	4	56.43	3	119.63	3	176.06
Jan 13–18, 2026	(United Kingdom) 2026 European Championships	14	55.72	16	101.37	15	157.09
