= Océane Piegad =

French pair skater (born 2003)

Personal information
- Full name: Océane Manon Mathilde Piegad
- Born: 12 August 2003 (age 23) Nice, France
- Home town: Maisons-Alfort, France
- Height: 1.56 m (5 ft 1 1/2 in)

Figure skating career
- Country: France
- Discipline: Pair skating (since 2021); Women's singles (2016–20)
- Partner: Denys Strekalin (2022–24); Remi Belmonte (2021–22)
- Coach: Laurent Depouilly; Nathalie Depouilly; Dominique Deniaud
- Skating club: NBAA
- Began skating: 2010

Medal record
French Championships
| Silver medal – second place | 2024 Vaujany | Pairs |

Océane Manon Mathilde Piegad (born 12 August 2003) is a French figure skater who currently competes in pairs. With her partner, Denys Strekalin, she is the 2024 French national silver medalist.

As a single skater, Piegad is the 2020 French junior national silver medalist and competed at the 2019 European Youth Olympic Winter Festival.

== Personal life ==
Piegad was born on 12 August 2003 in Nice, France. As of 2022, she is a university student studying physiotherapy.

== Career ==
=== Early career ===
Piegad began figure skating in 2010. As a singles skater, she won the silver medal at the 2020 French Junior Championships and finished as high as fifth on the senior level at the French Championships in 2020. She was coached Cedric Tour, Rodolphe Marechal, and Samantha Marechal.

She switched to pair skating following the 2019–20 figure skating season and skated with Remi Belmonte for the 2021–22 figure skating season, finishing fifth at the 2021 Tayside Trophy and nineteenth at the 2021 CS Warsaw Cup. Their partnership soon dissolved following that season. They were coached by Claude Thévenard.

=== Partnership with Strekalin ===
==== 2022–23 season ====
On 31 January 2022 it was announced that Piegad had formed a new partnership with Ukrainian-born pair skater, Denys Strekalin. Coached by Laurent Depouilly, Nathalie Depouilly, and Dominique Deniaud, the pair made their competitive debut at the 2022 CS Nebelhorn Trophy, where they finished in eleventh place, and then competed at the 2022 Master's de Patinage, winning the silver medal.

Invited to make their Grand Prix debut at the 2022 Grand Prix de France, they finished seventh of seven teams at the event. They went on to place fourth at the 2022 Bavarian Open and seventh at the 2023 International Challenge Cup.

==== 2023–24 season ====
Piegad/Strekalin began the season with a tenth-place finish at the 2023 CS Lombardia Trophy, before coming seventh at the 2023 CS Finlandia Trophy. Appearing on the Grand Prix at the 2023 Grand Prix de France, they finished fifth.

==== 2024-25 season ====
Piegad/Strekalin were assigned to the 2024 Grand Prix de France. They withdrew from the competition on September 17. On September 23, they announced their spilt due to injury.

== Programs ==
=== With Strekalin ===
| Season | Short program | Free skating |
|---|---|---|
| 2023–2024 | Le bal des fiancailles (Piano Trio No. 2) by Franz Schubert; Le cotege (Danse macabre) by Camille Saint-Saëns (from Les Noces de Feu) choreo. by Guillaume Cizeron | Silhouette by Aquilo; Nuvole Blanche by Ludovico Einaudi choreo. by Guillaume Cizeron |
| 2022–2023 | I Feel Like I'm Drowning by Two Feet choreo. by Pierre-Loup Bouquet, Brooke Appleyard | To Build a Home by The Cinematic Orchestra; Experience by Ludovico Einaudi choreo. by Pierre-Loup Bouquet, Brooke Appleyard |

=== With Belmonte ===
| Season | Short program | Free skating |
|---|---|---|
| 2021–2022 | Maktub by Marcus Viana choreo. by Pierre-Loup Bouquet | One Day I'll Fly Away (from Moulin Rouge!) performed by Nicole Kidman choreo. by Pierre-Loup Bouquet |

=== As a single skater ===
| Season | Short program | Free skating |
|---|---|---|
| 2019–2020 | Tango d'amor by Tango Jointz, feat. Bellma Cespedes; La Bohemia by Electro Dub Tango choreo. by Benoît Richaud | The History of Love; The Flood (from The History of Love) by Armand Amar choreo. by Benoît Richaud |

== Competitive highlights ==
=== Pairs with Strekalin ===
International
| Event | 22–23 | 23–24 | 24-25 |
|---|---|---|---|
| Europeans | | 12th | |
| GP France | 7th | 5th | WD |
| CS Finlandia | | 7th | |
| CS Golden Spin | WD | | |
| CS Lombardia Trophy | | 10th | |
| CS Nebelhorn Trophy | 11th | | |
| CS Warsaw Cup | WD | | |
| Bavarian Open | 4th | | |
| Challenge Cup | 7th | | |
| Trophée Nice | | 2nd | |
National
| French Nationals | | 2nd | |
| Master's de Patinage | 2nd | WD | |

=== Pairs with Belmonte ===
International
| Event | 21–22 |
|---|---|
| CS Warsaw Cup | 19th |
| Tayside Trophy | 5th |

=== Women's singles ===
International
| Event | 16–17 | 17–18 | 18–19 | 19–20 |
|---|---|---|---|---|
| Golden Bear | | | | 9th |
| Prague Ice Cup | | | | 7th |
International: Junior
| EYOF | | | 15th | |
| JGP Italy | | 18th | | |
| JGP Latvia | | | | 18th |
| Denkova-Staviski Cup | | 5th | | |
| Prague Ice Cup | | | 7th | |
| Tallinn Trophy | | 16th | | |
| Warsaw Cup | | | 6th | |
National
| French Champ. | | 9th | 6th | 5th |
| French Junior | | 6th | 6th | 2nd |
| Master's de Patinage | 8th J | 3rd J | 5th J | 2nd J |
