= 2023 Grand Prix de France =

Figure skating competition

- Type: Grand Prix
- Date: November 3 – 5
- Season: 2023–24
- Location: Angers, France
- Host: Fédération Française des Sports de Glace
- Venue: Angers IceParc

Champions
- Men's singles: (France) Adam Siao Him Fa
- Women's singles: (United States) Isabeau Levito
- Pairs: (Canada) Lia Pereira / Trennt Michaud
- Ice dance: (Italy) Charlène Guignard / Marco Fabbri
- Previous: 2022 Grand Prix de France
- Next: 2024 Grand Prix de France
- Previous GP: 2023 Skate Canada International
- Next GP: 2023 Cup of China

The 2023 Grand Prix de France was the third event of the 2023–24 ISU Grand Prix of Figure Skating: a senior-level international invitational competition series. It was held at the Angers IceParc in Angers from November 3–5. Medals were awarded in men's singles, women's singles, pair skating, and ice dance. Skaters earned points toward qualifying for the 2023–24 Grand Prix Final.

== Entries ==
The International Skating Union announced the preliminary assignments on June 28, 2023.

Country	Men	Women	Pairs	Ice dance
Belgium		Nina Pinzarrone		
Canada	Stephen Gogolev		Lia Pereira / Trennt Michaud	Laurence Fournier Beaudry / Nikolaj Sørensen; Marie-Jade Lauriault / Romain Le Gac
China	Boyang Jin			
Finland		Janna Jyrkinen		
France	Luc Economides; Landry Le May; Adam Siao Him Fa	Maïa Mazzara; Léa Serna; Lorine Schild	Camille Kovalev / Pavel Kovalev; Océane Piegad / Denys Strekalin; Oxana Vouillamoz / Flavien Giniaux	Marie Dupayage / Thomas Nabais; Natacha Lagouge / Arnaud Caffa; Evgeniia Lopareva / Geoffrey Brissaud
Georgia		Anastasiia Gubanova		
Italy	Nikolaj Memola		Sara Conti / Niccolò Macii; Anna Valesi / Manuel Piazza	Charlène Guignard / Marco Fabbri
Japan	Yuma Kagiyama; Takeru Amine Kataise; Koshiro Shimada	Mone Chiba; Wakaba Higuchi; Rion Sumiyoshi		
South Korea		Lee Hae-in		Hannah Lim / Ye Quan
Spain				Olivia Smart / Tim Dieck
Switzerland	Lukas Britschgi	Kimmy Repond		
United States	Ilia Malinin; Camden Pulkinen	Isabeau Levito	Ellie Kam / Daniel O'Shea; Valentina Plazas / Maximiliano Fernandez	Christina Carreira / Anthony Ponomarenko; Lorraine McNamara / Anton Spiridonov

== Changes to preliminary assignments ==
Discipline	Withdrew		Added		Notes	Ref.
Discipline	Date	Skater(s)	Date	Skater(s)	Notes	Ref.
Women	—		September 11	(France) Maia Mazzara	Host picks	
Women	—		September 11	(France) Lorine Schild	Host picks	
Men	—		September 19	(France) Luc Economides	Host picks	
Men	—		October 2	(France) Landry Le May	Host picks	
Pairs	—		October 2	(France) Oceane Piegad / Denys Strekalin	Host picks	
Ice dance	—		October 2	(France) Natacha Lagouge / Arnaud Caffa	Host picks	
Ice dance	October 23	(United States) Kaitlin Hawayek / Jean-Luc Baker	October 24	(Spain) Olivia Smart / Tim Dieck	Concussion (Hawayek)	
Men	October 26	(Italy) Daniel Grassl	October 30	(Canada) Stephen Gogolev		

== Results ==
=== Men's singles ===
Rank	Skater	Nation	Total points	SP		FS	
1st place, gold medalist(s)	Adam Siao Him Fa	France	306.78	2	101.07	1	205.71
2nd place, silver medalist(s)	Ilia Malinin	United States	304.68	1	101.58	2	203.10
3rd place, bronze medalist(s)	Yuma Kagiyama	Japan	273.14	3	97.91	4	175.23
4	Lukas Britschgi	Switzerland	263.43	4	86.94	3	176.49
5	Camden Pulkinen	United States	230.84	6	83.44	7	147.40
6	Luc Economides	France	230.74	9	76.99	5	153.75
7	Stephen Gogolev	Canada	228.74	5	86.14	10	142.60
8	Boyang Jin	China	226.79	7	81.43	8	145.36
9	Landry Le May	France	219.04	11	71.20	6	147.84
10	Koshiro Shimada	Japan	217.18	8	79.30	11	137.88
11	Nikolaj Memola	Italy	214.63	12	70.92	9	143.71
12	Takeru Amine Kataise	Japan	212.75	10	76.27	12	136.48

=== Women's singles ===
Rank	Skater	Nation	Total points	SP		FS	
1st place, gold medalist(s)	Isabeau Levito	United States	203.22	1	71.83	3	131.39
2nd place, silver medalist(s)	Nina Pinzarrone	Belgium	198.80	4	65.74	2	133.06
3rd place, bronze medalist(s)	Rion Sumiyoshi	Japan	197.76	5	61.72	1	136.04
4	Lee Hae-in	South Korea	190.96	3	66.30	5	124.66
5	Wakaba Higuchi	Japan	190.02	6	60.29	4	129.73
6	Anastasiia Gubanova	Georgia	187.66	2	66.73	7	120.93
7	Léa Serna	France	180.77	8	58.75	6	122.02
8	Lorine Schild	France	179.11	7	58.80	8	120.31
9	Mone Chiba	Japan	164.76	9	56.59	10	108.17
10	Kimmy Repond	Switzerland	164.63	10	50.64	9	113.99
11	Maïa Mazzara	France	137.44	11	45.03	11	92.41
12	Janna Jyrkinen	Finland	125.92	12	39.57	12	86.35

=== Pairs ===
Rank	Team	Nation	Total points	SP		FS	
1st place, gold medalist(s)	Lia Pereira / Trennt Michaud	Canada	194.67	1	65.97	1	128.70
2nd place, silver medalist(s)	Sara Conti / Niccolò Macii	Italy	189.46	2	65.31	2	124.15
3rd place, bronze medalist(s)	Camille Kovalev / Pavel Kovalev	France	172.88	3	59.04	3	113.84
4	Valentina Plazas / Maximiliano Fernandez	United States	168.20	4	58.46	4	109.74
5	Océane Piegad / Denys Strekalin	France	153.81	7	52.83	5	100.98
6	Anna Valesi / Manuel Piazza	Italy	150.57	6	53.95	6	96.62
7	Oxana Vouillamoz / Flavien Giniaux	France	141.57	8	51.56	7	90.01
WD	Ellie Kam / Daniel O'Shea	United States	withdrew	5	54.75	withdrew from competition	

=== Ice dance ===
Rank	Team	Nation	Total points	RD		FD	
1st place, gold medalist(s)	Charlène Guignard / Marco Fabbri	Italy	214.54	1	86.62	1	127.92
2nd place, silver medalist(s)	Laurence Fournier Beaudry / Nikolaj Sørensen	Canada	205.15	2	80.98	2	124.17
3rd place, bronze medalist(s)	Evgeniia Lopareva / Geoffrey Brissaud	France	190.82	3	76.95	3	113.87
4	Christina Carreira / Anthony Ponomarenko	United States	186.70	4	72.94	4	113.76
5	Marie-Jade Lauriault / Romain Le Gac	Canada	182.61	5	70.48	5	112.13
6	Hannah Lim / Ye Quan	South Korea	173.85	8	67.14	6	106.71
7	Marie Dupayage / Thomas Nabais	France	167.62	7	68.20	8	99.42
8	Olivia Smart / Tim Dieck	Spain	166.58	6	69.91	9	96.67
9	Lorraine McNamara / Anton Spiridonov	United States	164.25	9	64.77	7	99.48
10	Natacha Lagouge / Arnaud Caffa	France	154.67	10	60.24	10	94.43
