= Luc Economides =

French figure skater (born 1999)

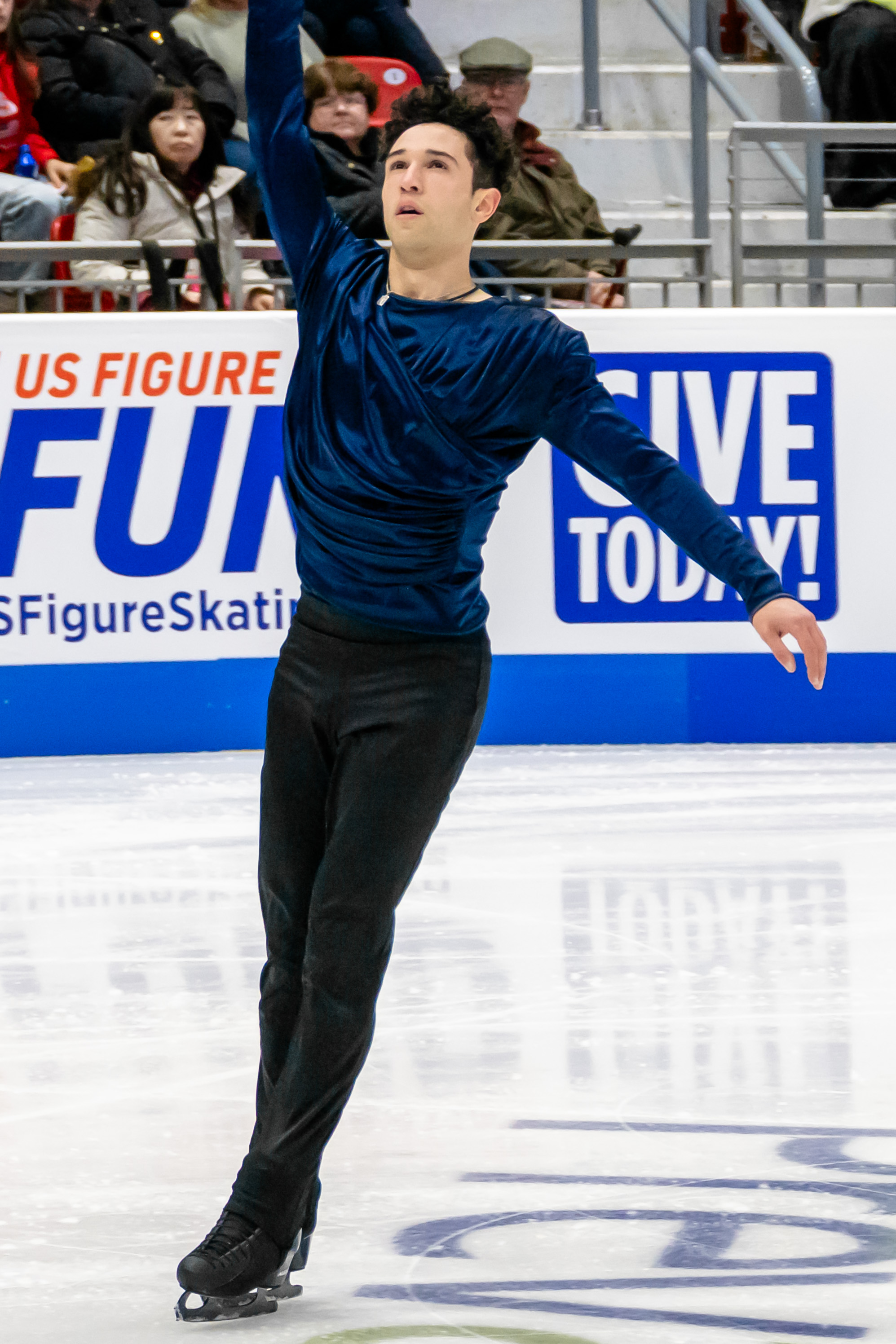
- Economides during his free skate at 2025 Skate America

Personal information
- Born: 2 March 1999 (age 27) Mont-Saint-Aignan, France
- Home town: Vaujany, France
- Height: 1.69 m (5 ft 6 1/2 in)

Figure skating career
- Country: Romania (since 2026); France (until 2026)
- Discipline: Men's singles
- Coach: Florent Amodio; Sofia Amodio; Daniel Raad
- Skating club: Amodio Figure Skating Academy
- Began skating: 2004

Medal record
French Championships
Silver medal – second place	2024 Vaujany	Singles
Bronze medal – third place	2022 Cergy-Pontoise	Singles
Bronze medal – third place	2025 Annecy	Singles
Bronze medal – third place	2026 Briancon	Singles

Luc Economides (born 2 March 1999) is a French figure skater who currently represents Romania. He is the 2026 Romanian national champion.

Representing France, he is the 2024 CS Cranberry Cup silver medalist, 2025 CS Golden Spin of Zagreb bronze medalist, and a four-time French national medalist.

At the junior level, he is the 2017 ISU Junior Grand Prix in Austria silver medalist, 2018 French national junior champion, and competed twice at the World Junior Championships.

== Personal life ==
Economides was born on 2 March 1999 in Mont-Saint-Aignan, France. He was raised in Rouen.

== Career ==
=== Early years ===
Economides began learning to skate in 2004. In 2012, he began commuting from Rouen to Cergy-Pontoise in order to be coached by Bernard Glesser.

In 2013, he competed internationally in the advanced novice ranks. His junior international debut came in November 2014. In January 2015, he placed 8th at the European Youth Olympic Winter Festival in Dornbirn, Austria.

Around 2015, he began training in Switzerland after Glesser decided to move there.

=== Skating for France ===
==== 2016–2017 season: Junior Grand Prix debut ====
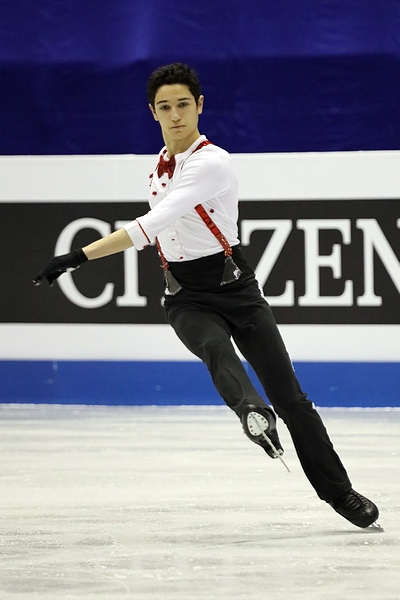
Economides at the 2017 World Junior Championships

During the season, Economides was coached by Bernard Glesser and Jean-François Ballester in La Chaux-de-Fonds, Switzerland. Making his ISU Junior Grand Prix (JGP) debut, he finished 11th in August at the 2016 JGP in Saint-Gervais-les-Bains, France. After placing 5th at the French Championships on the senior level, he won bronze at the French Junior Championships. In March, he competed at the 2017 World Junior Championships in Taipei but failed to qualify for the free skate after placing 30th in the short program.

==== 2017–2018 season: French junior national champion ====
Economides trained under Glesser at the start of the season. Competing in the 2017 JGP series, he won silver in early September in Salzburg, Austria, and placed 4th in October in Gdańsk, Poland.

Economides won the French junior title in February 2018. In March, he qualified to the final segment at the 2018 World Junior Championships. Ranked 21st in the short program and 13th in the free skate, he would finish 15th overall in Sofia, Bulgaria. Florent Amodio became his coach before Junior Worlds.

==== 2018–2019 season: Senior international debut ====
Economides made his senior international debut at the 2018 CS Lombardia Trophy in September, where he placed eighth. He competed in two other Challenger Series events, placing thirteenth at the 2018 CS Finlandia Trophy and seventh at the 2018 CS Tallinn Trophy. He placed fourth at the 2020 French Championships at the senior level.

==== 2019–2020 season ====
Economides performed at two Challenger series events, placing thirteenth again at the Finlandia Trophy and fifteenth at the Warsaw Cup. He was sixth at the French Championships.

==== 2020–2021 season ====
With the COVID-19 pandemic greatly limiting international competition, Economides' only event of the year was the Master's de Patinage, where he placed eighth.

==== 2021–2022 season: First senior national medal ====
Economides began the season by winning the silver medal at the Master's de Patinage. He made his international season debut at the 2021 CS Finlandia Trophy, placing eleventh. He then went on to win gold at the International Cup of Nice before closing his season with a bronze medal at the French Figure Skating Championships behind Kévin Aymoz and Adam Siao Him Fa.

==== 2022–2023 season: Grand Prix debut ====
Economides started the season with a sixth-place finish at the 2022 CS Lombardia Trophy. He then went on to win gold and silver at the Master's de Patinage and the International Cup of Nice, respectively.

Making his senior Grand Prix debut at the 2022 Grand Prix de France, Economides scored personal best short program, free skating, and combined total scores. He finished sixth overall.

==== 2023–2024 season: European and World Championships debut ====
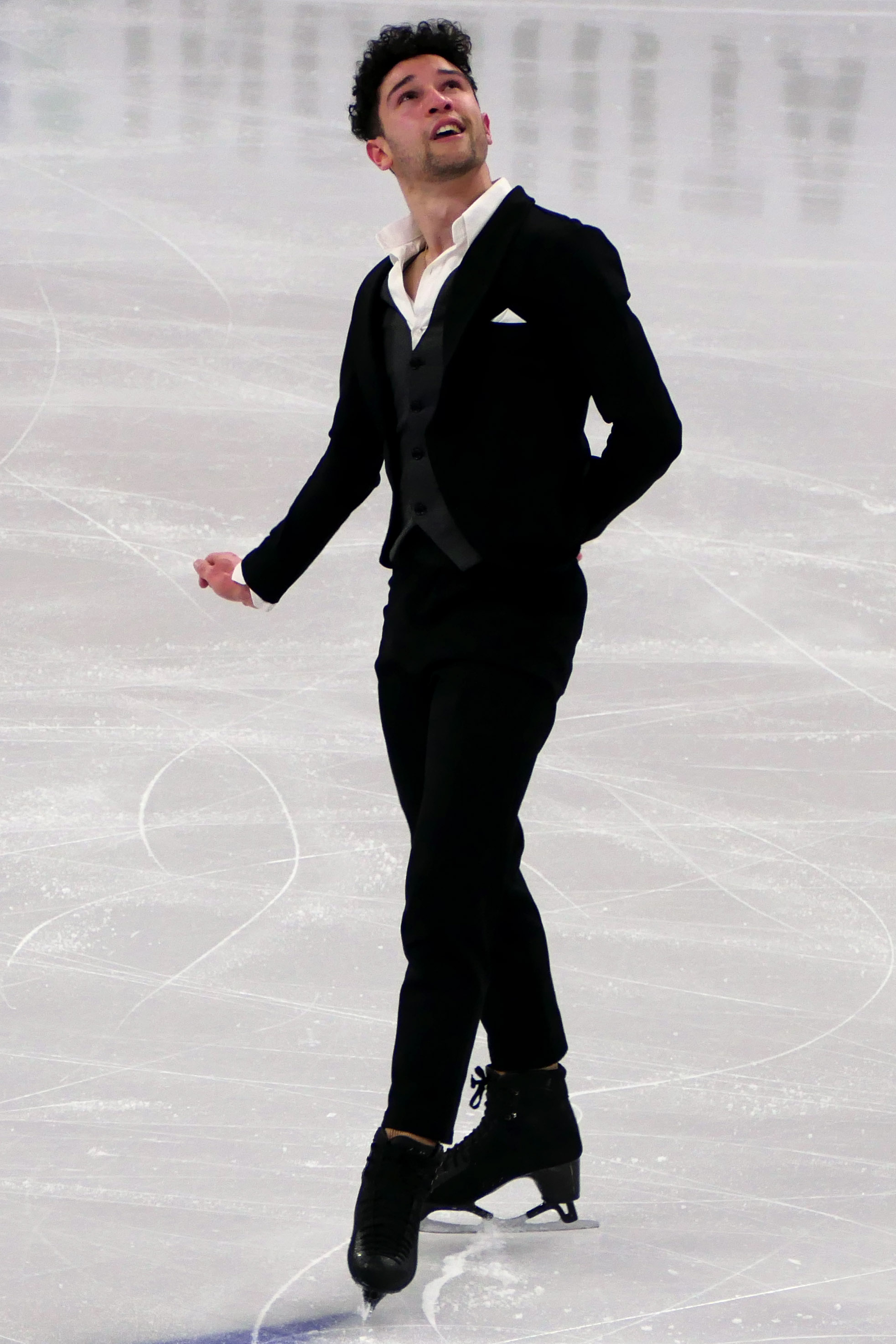
Economides at the 2024 World Championships

Opening the season at the 2023 CS Budapest Trophy, Economides placed seventh. Appearing on the Grand Prix for the second consecutive season at the Grand Prix de France, Economides placed sixth overall. He expressed satisfaction with his performance, as well as at having fulfilled his ambition of getting a second Grand Prix, the 2023 NHK Trophy. He went on to finish tenth in Japan.

After winning the silver medal at the French Championships, Economides received his first ISU championship assignments, placing fifteenth at the 2024 European Championships and twenty-first at the 2024 World Championships.

==== 2024–2025 season: First Challenger Series medal ====
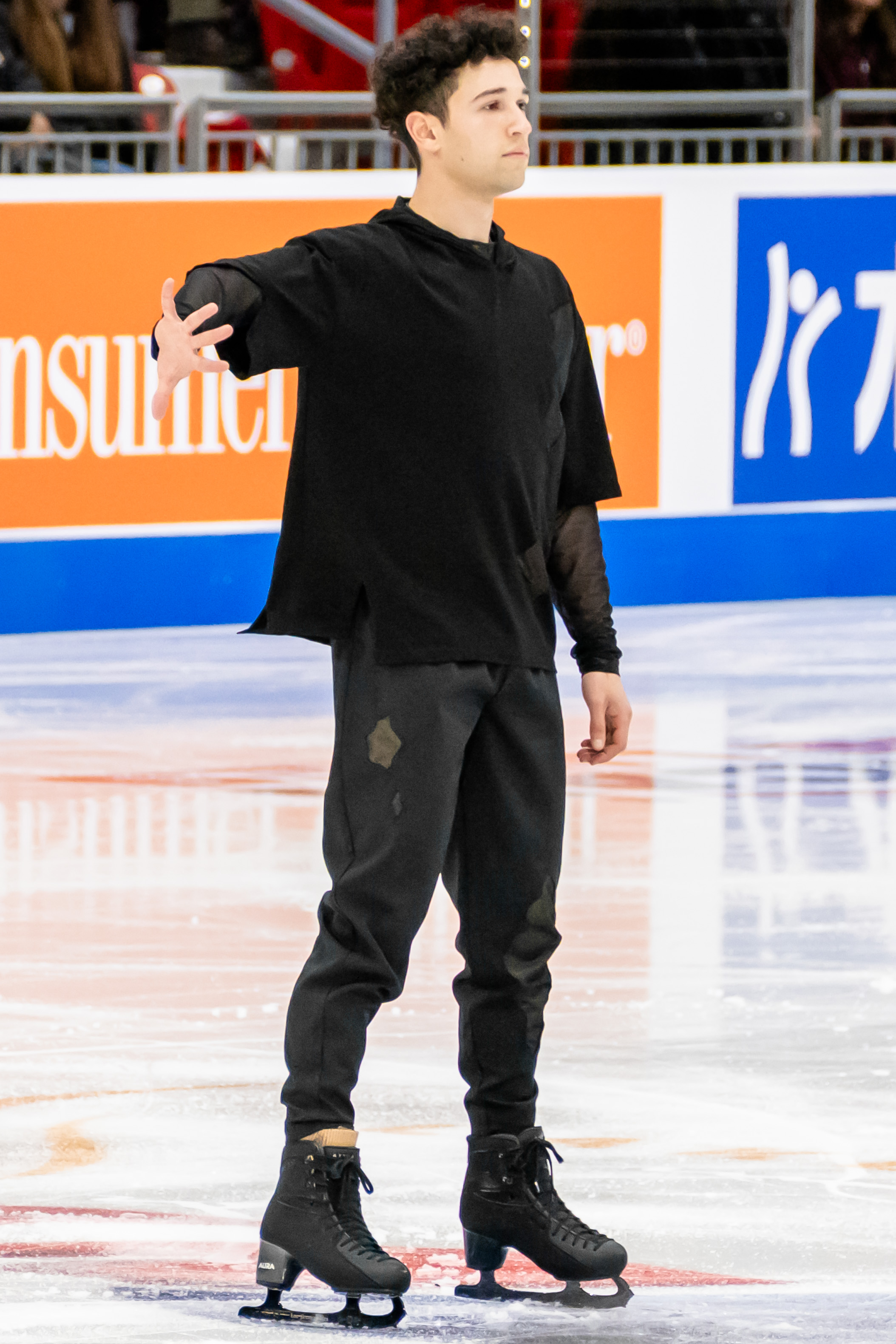
Economides during his short program at 2025 Skate America

Economides began the season in August by competing at the 2024 CS Cranberry Cup International, where he won the silver medal. He would then go on to win silver at the 2024 Master's de Patinage behind François Pitot.

Competing on the 2024–25 Grand Prix circuit, Economides finished eleventh at 2024 Skate Canada International and tenth at the 2024 Grand Prix de France.

In December, he won the bronze medal at the 2025 French Championships.

==== 2025–2026 season ====
Economides opened the season with a fifth-place finish at the 2025 Master's de Patinage and a ninth-place finish at the 2025 CS Lombardia Trophy. Going on to compete on the 2025–26 Grand Prix series, Economides placed eleventh at the 2025 Grand Prix de France and tenth at 2025 Skate America.

In December, he won the bronze medal at the 2025 CS Golden Spin of Zagreb. Later that month, he took bronze at the 2026 French Championships.

=== Skating for Romania ===
==== 2026–2027 season ====
In late August, Economides requested a release from the French federation to switch sporting nationalities to Romania.

Economides was cleared to compete for Romania and debuted for the country at the 2026 Crystal Skate in Bucharest where he won the gold medal.

== Programs ==
Season	Short program	Free skate	Exhibition	Ref.
2016–17	Amélie by Yann Tiersen Choreo. by Florent Amodio	Broken Sorrow By Nuttin' But Stringz Choreo. by Florent Amodio	—N/a	
2017–18	Send In the Clowns Performed by Barbra Streisand Choreo. by Florent Amodio	Un Amor By Gipsy Kings Choreo. by Florent Amodio	—N/a	
2018–19	Sinner Man By Nina Simone Choreo. by Florent Amodio	Un Amor By Gipsy Kings Choreo. by Florent Amodio	—N/a	
2019–20	Rain, In Your Black Eyes By Ezio Bosso Choreo. by Florent Amodio	Dank Mozart By Illuminati; Lacrymosa By Wolfgang Amadeus Mozart; Dies irae (Avance Remix) By Apashe & Black Prez Choreo. by Florent Amodio	—N/a	
2020–21	Adagio in G minor By Tomaso Albinoni Performed by Mac Quayle Choreo. by Florent Amodio	—N/a	—N/a	
2021–22	"I Like It Like That" By Pete Rodriguez; "I Like It" By Cardi B, Bad Bunny & J Balvin Choreo. by Florent Amodio	Limelight; Modern Times; City Lights By Charlie Chaplin Choreo. by Florent Amodio	—N/a	
2022–23	"I Like It Like That" By Pete Rodriguez; "I Like It" By Cardi B, Bad Bunny & J Balvin Choreo. by Florent Amodio	"Shallow" By Lady Gaga & Bradley Cooper Performed by Ndlovu Youth Choir; Senie By Angélique Kidjo; Wild is Life By Daniel Deuschle; "Shape of You" By Ed Sheeran Performed by Wouter Kellerman & Ndlovu Youth Choir Choreo. by Florent Amodio	GANJI; Gangnam Style By Psy	
2023–24	"Selah" By Kanye West Choreo. by Florent Amodio & Javier Fernandez	"Smile" Performed by Nat King Cole; "Nonsense Song" (from Modern Times) By Charlie Chaplin Choreo. by Florent Amodio	—N/a	
2024–25	Hier encore By Charles Aznavour Choreo. by Florent Amodio & Artem Fedorchenko	Interstellar By Hans Zimmer Choreo. by Florent Amodio & Artem Fedorchenko	—N/a	
2025–26	"Selah" By Kanye West Choreo. by Florent Amodio & Javier Fernandez	Interstellar By Hans Zimmer Choreo. by Florent Amodio & Artem Fedorchenko	—N/a	

== Competitive highlights ==
- GP – Event of the ISU Grand Prix Series
- JGP – Event of the ISU Junior Grand Prix Series
- CS – Event of the ISU Challenger Series
- TBD – Assigned
- WD – Withdrew from competition

=== Single skating (for Romania) ===
Competition placements at senior level
Season	2026–27
Romanian Championships	1st
Crystal Skate	1st

=== Single skating (for France) ===
Competition placements at senior level
Season	2018–19	2019–20	2020–21	2021–22	2022–23	2023–24	2024-25	2025–26
World Championships						21st		
European Championships						15th		
French Championships	4th	6th		3rd	WD	2nd	3rd	3rd
GP France					6th	6th	10th	11th
GP NHK Trophy						10th		
GP Skate America								10th
GP Skate Canada							11th	
CS Budapest Trophy						7th		
CS Cranberry Cup							2nd	
CS Finlandia Trophy	13th	13th		11th				
CS Golden Spin of Zagreb								3rd
CS Lombardia Trophy	8th				6th			8th
CS Tallinn Trophy	7th							
CS Warsaw Cup		15th			4th		6th	
Bellu Memorial				1st				2nd
Challenge Cup	13th							
Master's de Patinage	2nd	3rd	8th	2nd	3rd	4th	2nd	5th
Santa Claus Cup		1st						
Tallink Hotels Cup						5th		
Trophée Métropole Nice				1st	2nd			

Competition placements at junior level
Season	2013–14	2014–15	2015–16	2016–17	2017–18
World Junior Championships				30th	15th
French Championships (Senior)		9th	7th	5th	7th
French Championships (Junior)		7th	3rd	3rd	1st
JGP Austria					2nd
JGP France				11th	
JGP Poland					4th
JGP Russia				10th	
European Youth Olympic Festival		8th			
Master's de Patinage	4th	5th	3rd	2nd	1st
Volvo Open Cup		5th			

== Detailed results ==
ISU personal best scores in the +5/-5 GOE System
Segment	Type	Score	Event
Total	TSS	230.74	2024 CS Cranberry Cup International
Short program	TSS	78.59	2024 CS Cranberry Cup International
Short program	TES	41.69	2024 CS Cranberry Cup International
Short program	PCS	37.54	2024 CS Cranberry Cup International
Free skating	TSS	153.75	2024 CS Cranberry Cup International
Free skating	TES	79.19	2023 Grand Prix de France
Free skating	PCS	77.26	2024 CS Cranberry Cup International

=== Single skating (for Romania) ===
Results in the 2026–27 season
Date	Event	SP		FS		Total	
Date	Event	P	Score	P	Score	P	Score
27 Oct–1 Nov 2026	(Romania) 2026 Crystal Skate	1	77.78	1	136.68	1	214.46

=== Single skating (for France) ===
Results in the 2014–15 season
Date	Event	SP		FS		Total	
Date	Event	P	Score	P	Score	P	Score
18–21 Dec 2014	(France) 2015 French Championships	9	45.73	9	73.11	9	118.84

Results in the 2015–16 season
Date	Event	SP		FS		Total	
Date	Event	P	Score	P	Score	P	Score
17–19 Dec 2015	(France) 2016 French Championships	5	55.54	8	104.36	7	159.90

Results in the 2016–17 season
Date	Event	SP		FS		Total	
Date	Event	P	Score	P	Score	P	Score
15–17 Dec 2016	(France) 2017 French Championships	6	63.59	5	120.28	5	183.87

Results in the 2017–18 season
Date	Event	SP		FS		Total	
Date	Event	P	Score	P	Score	P	Score
14–16 Dec 2017	(France) 2018 French Championships	7	62.78	7	119.98	7	182.76

Results in the 2018–19 season
Date	Event	SP		FS		Total	
Date	Event	P	Score	P	Score	P	Score
12–16 Sep 2018	(Italy) 2018 CS Lombardia Trophy	7	68.60	10	114.95	8	183.55
25–27 Sep 2018	(France) 2018 Master's de Patinage	5	61.99	1	142.49	2	204.48
4–7 Oct 2018	(Finland) 2018 CS Finlandia Trophy	14	59.57	12	120.83	13	180.40
Nob 26 – 2 Dec 2018	(Estonia) 2018 CS Tallinn Trophy	9	62.73	7	127.45	7	190.18
13–15 Dec 2018	(France) 2019 French Championships	6	67.81	4	122.35	4	190.16
21–24 Feb 2019	(Netherlands) 2019 International Challenge Cup	12	59.13	15	95.68	13	154.81

Results in the 2019–20 season
Date	Event	SP		FS		Total	
Date	Event	P	Score	P	Score	P	Score
26–28 Sep 2019	(France) 2019 Master's de Patinage	2	77.39	4	125.71	3	203.10
11–13 Oct 2019	(Finland) 2019 CS Finlandia Trophy	6	69.82	16	99.94	13	169.76
14–17 Nov 2019	(Poland) 2019 CS Warsaw Cup	14	59.87	15	110.27	15	170.14
2–8 Dec 2019	(Hungary) 2019 Santa Claus Cup	1	64.92	1	129.66	1	194.58
19–21 Dec 2019	(France) 2020 French Championships	6	65.28	5	129.26	6	194.54

Results in the 2020–21 season
Date	Event	SP		FS		Total	
Date	Event	P	Score	P	Score	P	Score
1–3 Oct 2020	(France) 2020 Master's de Patinage	6	68.06	8	118.76	8	186.82

Results in the 2021–22 season
Date	Event	SP		FS		Total	
Date	Event	P	Score	P	Score	P	Score
30 Sep – 2 Oct 2021	(France) 2021 Master's de Patinage	2	80.14	2	145.26	2	225.40
7–10 Oct 2021	(Finland) 2021 CS Finlandia Trophy	12	68.99	10	138.70	11	207.69
20–24 Oct 2021	(France) 2021 Trophée Métropole Nice Côte d'Azur	7	67.18	1	137.86	1	205.04
16–18 Dec 2021	(France) 2022 French Championships	3	84.10	3	145.69	3	229.79
24–27 Feb 2022	(Romania) 2022 Bellu Memorial	2	86.23	1	154.83	1	241.06

Results in the 2022–23 season
Date	Event	SP		FS		Total	
Date	Event	P	Score	P	Score	P	Score
15–18 Sep 2022	(Italy) 2022 CS Lombardia Trophy	6	64.83	6	132.58	6	197.41
6–8 Oct 2022	(France) 2022 Master's de Patinage	2	77.97	3	128.92	3	206.89
18–23 Oct 2022	(France) 2022 Trophée Métropole Nice Côte d'Azur	4	64.30	2	146.95	2	211.25
4–6 Nov 2022	2022 Grand Prix de France	6	77.23	5	152.41	6	229.64
17–20 Nov 2022	(Poland) 2022 CS Warsaw Cup	8	73.37	4	148.87	4	222.24
15–17 Dec 2022	(France) 2023 French Championships	13	54.80	–	–	–	WD

Results in the 2023–24 season
Date	Event	SP		FS		Total	
Date	Event	P	Score	P	Score	P	Score
28–30 Sep 2023	(France) 2023 Master's de Patinage	3	79.13	4	133.32	4	212.45
13–15 Oct 2023	(Hungary) 2023 CS Budapest Trophy	6	73.13	6	139.78	7	212.91
3–5 Nov 2023	2023 Grand Prix de France	9	76.99	5	153.75	6	230.74
24–26 Nov 2023	(Japan) 2023 NHK Trophy	10	74.24	11	136.88	10	211.12
10–14 Dec 2023	(France) 2024 French Championships	3	86.55	2	157.04	2	243.59
8–14 Jan 2024	(Lithuania) 2024 European Championships	7	78.59	17	131.97	15	210.56
15–18 Feb 2024	(Estonia) 2024 Tallink Hotels Cup	5	69.54	6	135.43	5	204.97
18–24 Mar 2024	(Canada) 2024 World Championships	22	74.02	19	143.08	21	217.10

Results in the 2024–25 season
Date	Event	SP		FS		Total	
Date	Event	P	Score	P	Score	P	Score
8–11 Aug 2024	(United States) 2024 CS Cranberry Cup International	4	81.57	3	155.30	2	236.87
26–28 Sep 2024	(France) 2024 Master's de Patinage	2	83.24	5	128.08	2	211.32
25–27 Oct 2024	2024 Skate Canada International	8	77.87	11	134.01	11	211.88
1–3 Nov 2024	2024 Grand Prix de France	9	69.66	8	135.89	10	205.55
20–24 Nov 2024	(Poland) 2024 CS Warsaw Cup	4	76.03	7	127.99	6	204.02

Results in the 2025–26 season
Date	Event	SP		FS		Total	
Date	Event	P	Score	P	Score	P	Score
28–30 Aug 2025	(France) 2025 Master's de Patinage	4	81.59	5	120.62	5	202.21
11–14 Sep 2025	(Italy) 2025 CS Lombardia Trophy	7	79.82	7	149.37	8	229.19
17–19 Oct 2025	2025 Grand Prix de France	10	75.20	10	133.66	11	208.86
14–16 Nov 2025	(United States) 2025 Skate America	10	71.98	10	129.38	10	201.36
3–6 Dec 2025	(Croatia) 2025 CS Golden Spin of Zagreb	4	78.80	4	140.80	3	219.60
18–20 Dec 2025	(France) 2026 French Championships	3	83.01	5	143.34	3	226.35
25 Feb – 1 Mar 2026	(Romania) 2026 Bellu Memorial	1	79.92	2	111.31	2	191.23

=== Junior level ===
Results in the 2013–14 season
Date	Event	SP		FS		Total	
Date	Event	P	Score	P	Score	P	Score
3–5 Oct 2013	(France) 2013 Master's de Patinage	4	45.95	4	79.29	4	125.24

Results in the 2014–15 season
Date	Event	SP		FS		Total	
Date	Event	P	Score	P	Score	P	Score
2–4 Oct 2014	(France) 2014 Master's de Patinage	5	47.34	5	90.62	5	137.96
5–9 Nov 2014	(Latvia) 25th Volvo Open Cup	4	47.95	6	87.16	5	135.11
25–30 Jan 2015	(Austria) 2015 European Youth Olympic Winter Festival	7	50.95	8	94.18	8	145.13
20–22 Feb 2015	(France) 2015 French Championships (Junior)	8	39.78	6	86.36	7	126.14

Results in the 2015–16 season
Date	Event	SP		FS		Total	
Date	Event	P	Score	P	Score	P	Score
8–10 Oct 2015	(France) 2015 Master's de Patinage	2	55.36	3	94.16	3	149.52
27–28 Feb 2016	(France) 2016 French Championships (Junior)	2	57.79	3	106.27	3	164.06

Results in the 2016–17 season
Date	Event	SP		FS		Total	
Date	Event	P	Score	P	Score	P	Score
24–28 Aug 2016	2016 JGP France	7	56.18	10	105.88	11	162.06
14–18 Sep 2016	2016 JGP Russia	9	53.60	10	102.96	10	156.56
6–8 Oct 2016	(France) 2016 Master's de Patinage	4	50.67	3	103.73	2	154.40
24–26 Feb 2017	(France) 2017 French Championships (Junior)	1	62.76	8	95.47	3	158.23
15–19 Mar 2017	(Taiwan) 2017 World Junior Championships	30	53.52	–	–	30	53.52

Results in the 2017–18 season
Date	Event	SP		FS		Total	
Date	Event	P	Score	P	Score	P	Score
30 Aug – 2 Sep 2017	2017 JGP Austria	2	65.88	3	124.71	2	190.59
28–30 Sep 2017	(France) 2017 Master's de Patinage	1	72.98	1	122.83	1	195.81
4–7 Oct 2017	2017 JGP Poland	3	71.04	6	124.92	4	195.96
23–25 Feb 2018	(France) 2018 French Championships (Junior)	1	64.04	2	123.83	1	187.87
5–11 Mar 2018	(Bulgaria) 2018 World Junior Championships	21	58.84	13	120.71	15	179.55
