= Maé-Bérénice Méité =

French figure skater

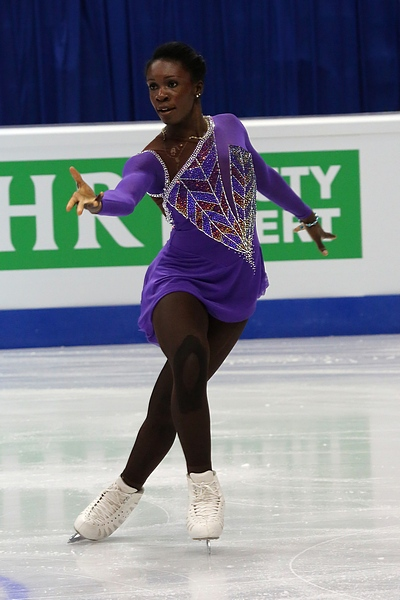
- Maé-Bérénice Méité at the 2016 European Championships

Personal information
- Born: 21 September 1994 (age 32) Paris, France
- Home town: Vitry sur Seine, France
- Height: 1.68 m (5 ft 6 in)

Figure skating career
- Country: France
- Discipline: Women's singles
- Coach: Lorenzo Magri; John Zimmerman; Silvia Fontana
- Skating club: Vitry Skating Club
- Began skating: 1999

Medal record
French Championships
Gold medal – first place	2014 Vaujany	Singles
Gold medal – first place	2015 Megève	Singles
Gold medal – first place	2016 Épinal	Singles
Gold medal – first place	2018 Nantes	Singles
Gold medal – first place	2019 Vaujany	Singles
Gold medal – first place	2020 Dunkirk	Singles
Silver medal – second place	2012 Dammarie-les-Lys	Singles
Silver medal – second place	2013 Strasbourg	Singles
Silver medal – second place	2017 Caen	Singles
Bronze medal – third place	2011 Tours	Singles

Maé-Bérénice Méité (French pronunciation: [ma.e be.re.nis mej.te]; born 21 September 1994) is a French figure skater. She is the 2011 Ondrej Nepela Memorial champion, the 2016 International Cup of Nice champion, the 2015 Winter Universiade silver medalist, and a six-time French national champion.

She has finished in the top six at three European Championships and represented France at the 2014 and 2018 Winter Olympics.

== Personal life ==
Maé-Bérénice Méité, an only child, was born in Paris, France. Her parents are from Ivory Coast and Congo. Fluent in English and Spanish, she is interested in foreign languages and perfume-making. She plays the violin. After obtaining a science degree, she studied management through distance education at University of Montpellier 1. In February 2022, she developed a digital figure skating planner, called Ice Planner.

== Career ==
Méité began learning to skate as a five-year-old. She won the silver medal in novice ladies at her first international event, the 2007 Cup of Nice.

In addition to her singles skating, Méité participates in ice theatre with her skating club.

=== 2008–09 season ===
Méité moved up to the junior level in 2008–09, finishing eighth and sixth in her two events. She then took part in her second French Nationals and won the silver medal behind Candice Didier. Consequently, she was chosen to represent France at the 2009 World Junior Championships, where she finished in twelfth place.

=== 2009–10 season ===
In 2009–10, Méité was thirteenth at the JGP Budapest and sixth at the JGP Croatia. She won her second silver medal at French Nationals, this time behind Léna Marrocco, who was selected for the French slot at the 2010 Junior Worlds.

=== 2010–11 season ===
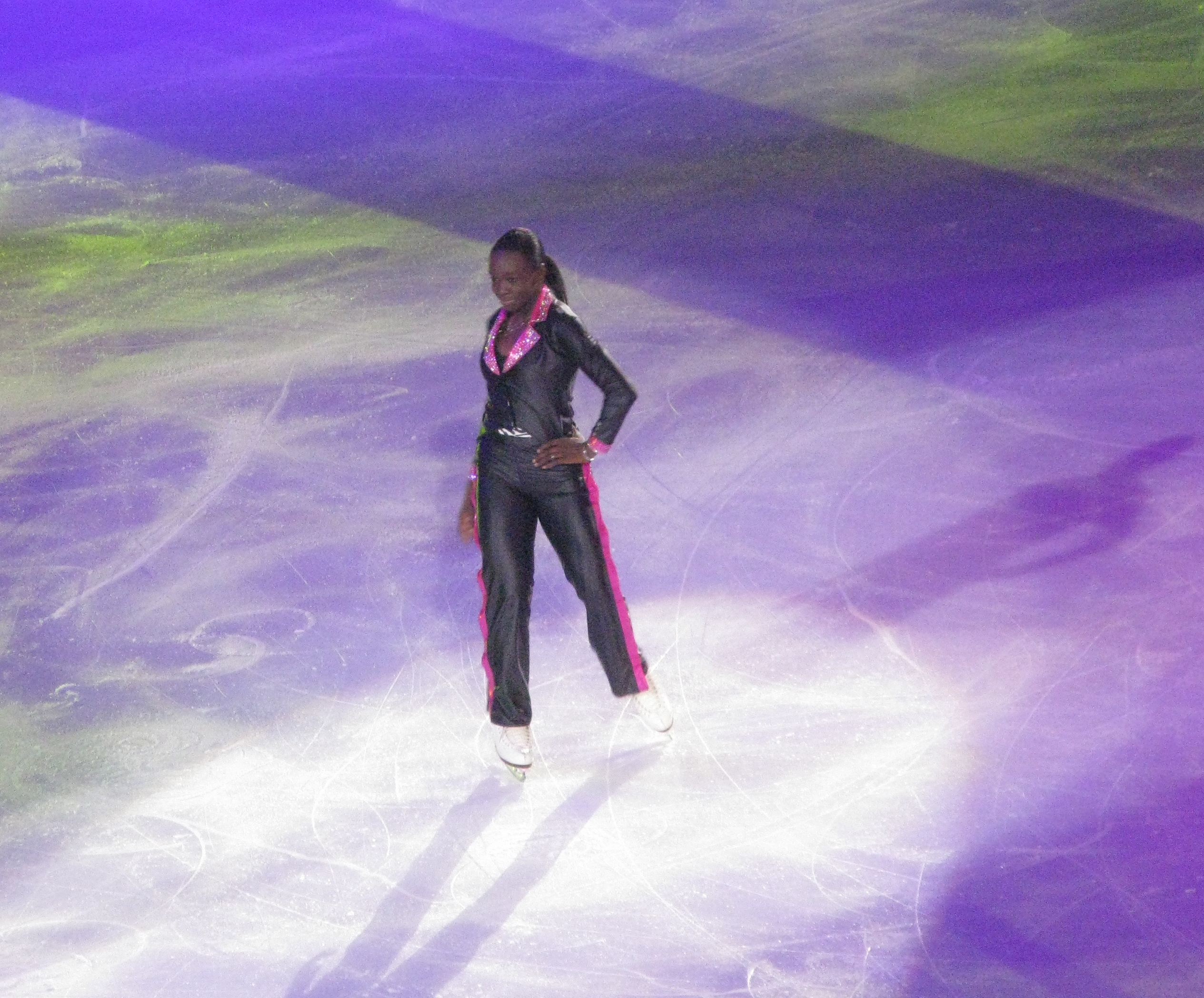
Maé-Bérénice at the 2010 Trophée Éric Bompard.

In 2010–11, Méité moved up to the senior level. She competed at the 2010 Skate America, finishing 8th, and the 2010 Trophée Éric Bompard, where she placed ninth. In December, she won the bronze medal at French Nationals but was nonetheless named to the French team for the 2011 European Championships, where her goal was a top ten finish. Because France did not have a direct entry to the short program in the ladies' discipline, Méité had to compete in the qualifying round; she finished second and qualified for the short program. She finished seventh in the program with a new personal best score and tenth in the free skating after falling on both triple lutzes. She finished in ninth place overall; Méité said that although her skating "wasn't perfect", she was "very satisfied with it". She was fourteenth in her Worlds debut.

=== 2011–12 season ===
Méité began the 2011–12 season at the 2011 Ondrej Nepela Memorial. She was first in the short program and second in the free skate and took her first international title. Competing in the 2011–12 Grand Prix series, she placed seventh at the 2011 NHK Trophy and sixth at the 2011 Trophée Éric Bompard. She finished thirteenth at the 2012 European Championships and completed the season as part of team France at the World Team Trophy.

=== 2012–13 season ===
Méité began the 2012–13 season at the 2012 Skate America; she was fourth in the short program and 6th overall. She finished fifth at the 2012 Trophée Éric Bompard and eleventh at the 2013 World Championships.

=== 2013–14 season: First national title and Sochi Olympics ===
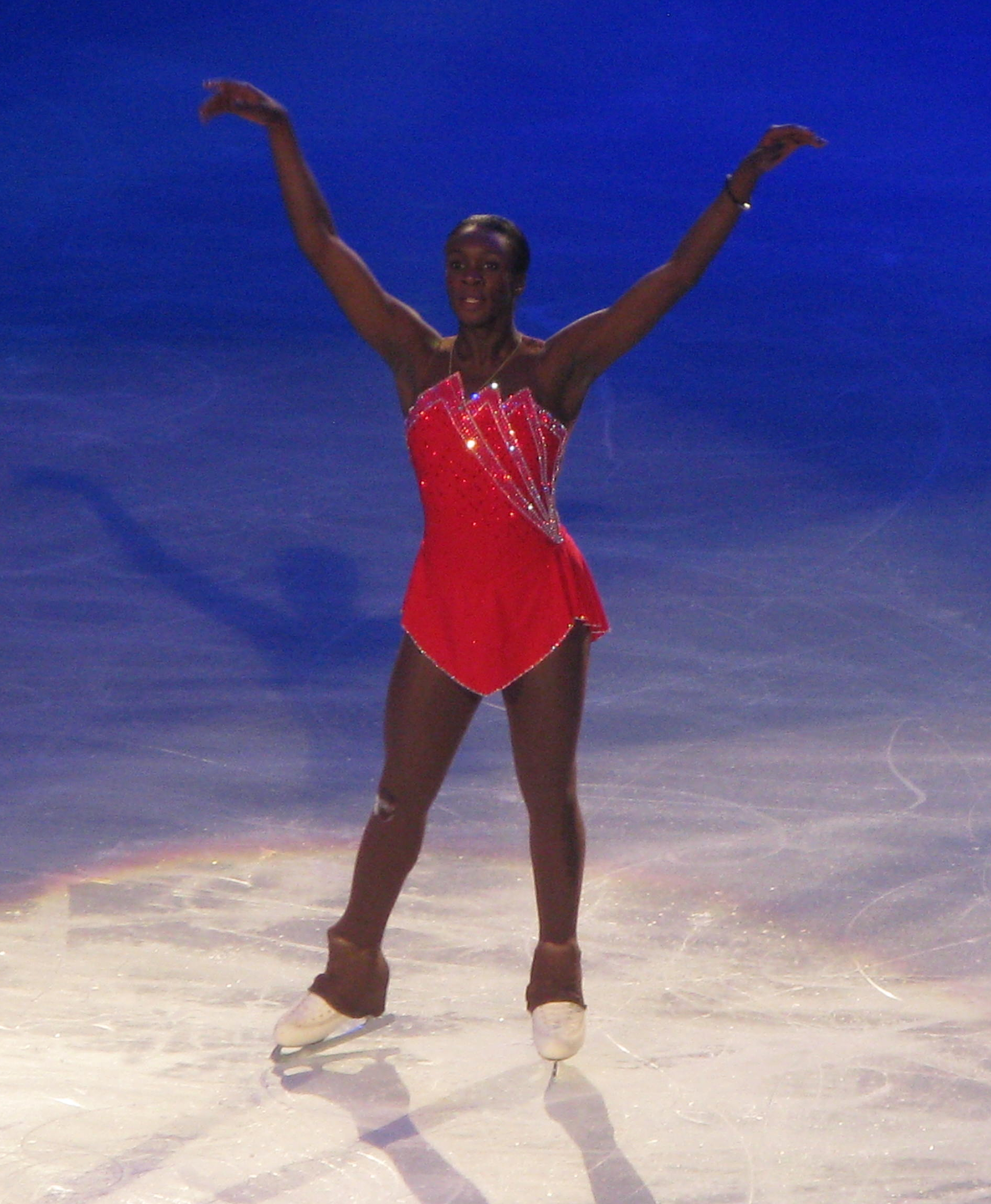
Maé-Bérénice at the 2013 Trophée Éric Bompard.

Méité won her first senior national title at the 2014 French Championships. She was selected to represent France at the 2014 Winter Olympics in Sochi, where she finished tenth.

=== 2014–15 season ===
In the 2014–15 season, Méité was coached by Katia Krier in Paris. Although troubled by her right knee from mid-November 2014, she finished sixth at the 2015 European Championships in Stockholm and tenth at the 2015 World Championships in Shanghai.

Méité was diagnosed with a tear in her right patellar tendon. In April 2015, she decided to begin treatment. She did not jump for three months.

=== 2015–16 season ===
Claude Thevenard was listed as Méité's coach by October 2015. She won her third national title and placed 6th at the 2016 European Championships in Bratislava, Slovakia.

=== 2016–17 season ===
Méité started the season off at the 2016 International Cup of Nice, where she won with a score of 169.25. She placed seventh with a score of 172.65 at her only Grand Prix event that season, the 2016 Trophée de France. She placed second at the 2016 French Figure Skating Championships in December. At the 2017 Toruń Cup, she placed second with a score of 156.40. She placed sixteenth at the 2017 European Championships with a score of 145.07. She went to the 2017 World Team Trophy and placed twelfth individually.

=== 2017–18 season: Pyeongchang Olympics ===
Méité was assigned to compete at the 2017 CS Autumn Classic International, where she placed 8th. She placed eleventh at her first Grand Prix event of the season, 2017 Rostelecom Cup. She placed eighth at her second event, the 2017 Internationaux de France. In December, she won her fourth national title at the 2017 French Figure Skating Championships. She placed eighth at the 2018 European Championships.

In February, Méité competed at the 2018 Winter Olympics in Pyeongchang, South Korea. She placed ninth in the team event short program with a score of 46.62, and placed nineteenth in the ladies' singles event with a score of 159.92. During the season, she was coached by Shanetta Folle in Chicago.

=== 2018–19 season ===
Méité decided to train in Tampa, Florida, coached by Silvia Fontana and John Zimmerman. At her first event of the season, the 2018 CS Autumn Classic International, she placed third with a personal best score of 178.89. She placed tenth at the 2018 NHK Trophy with a score of 162.58. In late November, she placed eighth at the 2018 Internationaux de France.

In a November interview, Méité stated that focusing on strengthening her leg muscles, including the quadriceps, hamstrings, and calves, had effectively reduced her knee pain. In December, Méité won her fifth national title at the 2018 French Championships. At the 2019 European Championships, she finished seventh, two ordinals below French silver medalist Laurine Lecavelier, and as a result, Lecavelier was chosen to represent France at the 2019 World Championships.

=== 2019–20 season ===
Méité began the season with a seventh-place finish at the 2019 CS Autumn Classic International. She placed tenth at the 2019 Internationaux de France and placed eleventh at the 2019 NHK Trophy. In December, Méité won her sixth national title at the 2019 French Championships.

Competing at the 2020 European Championships, Méité placed eighth in the short program with only an under-rotation on the second part of her jump combination. Tenth in the free skate, she placed ninth overall. She was scheduled to compete at the World Championships in Montreal, but those were canceled as a result of the coronavirus pandemic.

=== 2020–21 season ===
Méité was scheduled to compete on the Grand Prix at the 2020 Internationaux de France, but the event was canceled as a result of the pandemic. Méité began her season at the International Challenge Cup in February, where she placed fourth. On March 1, she was named to France's team for the 2021 World Championships in Stockholm. Competing in the short program, she injured her left ankle on the takeoff to a triple toe loop and was forced to withdraw from the competition. The French federation subsequently stated that she had torn her Achilles tendon. Méité reported having had successful surgery on March 30, stating that she planned to resume training once feasible.

=== 2021–22 season ===
Méité returned to training in October, announcing that she started to train in the Young Goose Academy with Italian Coach Lorenzo Magri in Egna, Italy, and part-time in Tampa with Fontana. She has described her injury as a "blessing in disguise". Scheduled to compete at the 2021 Internationaux de France, she withdrew as it was not enough to "present quality programs" after only returning on the ice for a month. She later withdrew from French Nationals, subsequently leaving her ineligible for the European and World Championships, stating it was the "toughest decision" she has ever made.

Méité would also withdrew from the Tallinn Cup in February. She made her competitive return in April, competing at the 2022 Egna Spring Trophy and placing fifth.

=== 2022–23 season ===
In her first appearance of the season, Méité came eleventh at the 2022 CS Nepela Memorial. In her return to the Grand Prix on home ice at the 2022 Grand Prix de France, she finished eighth. She attracted attention for presenting the winner, Loena Hendrickx, with a birthday cake after the free skate, which occurred on that occasion.

Méité came fourth at the French championships.

=== 2023–24 season ===
Beginning the Grand Prix at the 2023 Skate Canada International, Méité was twelfth.

== Programs ==
Season	Short program	Free skating	Exhibition
2023–2024	They Don't Care About Us by Michael Jackson choreo. by Rohene Ward	I Surrender by Celine Dion choreo. by Rohene Ward	Lift Me Up (from Black Panther: Wakanda Forever) by Rihanna; Cuff It by Beyoncé
2022–2023	They Don't Care About Us by Michael Jackson choreo. by Rohene Ward	I Surrender by Celine Dion choreo. by Rohene Ward	Mas que nada by Sérgio Mendes ft. Black Eyed Peas
2021–2022	Mas que nada by Sérgio Mendes ft. Black Eyed Peas	Nyah; Nyah and Ethan by Hans Zimmer both arranged by Maxime Rodriguez	
2020–2021	If I Ain't Got You by Alicia Keys	Earth Song; They Don't Care About Us by Michael Jackson; Dark Side of Scorched Earth by Karl Hugo	
2019–2020	Mas que nada by Sérgio Mendes ft. Black Eyed Peas	Hometown Glory by Adele choreo. by Adam Rippon	
2018–2019	Stay by Rihanna feat. Mikky Ekko	Nyah; Nyah and Ethan by Hans Zimmer both arranged by Maxime Rodriguez	Michael Jackson medley; Dirty Diana; The Way You Make Me Feel; Don't Stop ‘Til You Get Enough
2017–2018	Halo by Beyoncé, Ryan Tedder, E. Kidd Bogart performed by Jasmin Thompson; Run the World (Girls) by Beyoncé and others choreo. by Benoît Richaud	Les Nocturnes de Chopin; Happy by C2C	Queen of the Field by Alicia Keys; Freedom
2016–2017	Halo by Beyoncé, Ryan Tedder, E. Kidd Bogart performed by Jasmin Thompson; Run the World (Girls) by Beyoncé and others choreo. by Benoît Richaud; Goodness by Poddsy; Freedom Fighters by Thomas Bergersen / Two Steps from Hell	Tristan and Isolde by Maxime Rodriguez choreo. by Shanetta Folle	Powerful (Math Club Remix) by the cast of Empire
2015–2016	Feeling Good by Michael Bublé; Black Swan by Clint Mansell	Tristan and Isolde by Maxime Rodriguez choreo. by Shanetta Folle	
2014–2015	Hosanna performed by Soweto Gospel Choir; The Groove You Liked (Mala Dub) by Savanj Rooms; Freedom	Conquest of Spaces; Shadows; Run Boy Run by Woodkid	Show Me How You Burlesque (from Burlesque) by Christina Aguilera; Hosanna performed by Soweto Gospel Choir; The Groove You Liked (Mala Dub) by Savanj Rooms; Swan Lake by Pyotr Ilyich Tchaikovsky
2013–2014	The Question of U by Prince	Europa by Jean-Pierre Danel; We Will Rock You KCPK; La Grange by Jean-Pierre Danel	Love Story by Francis Lai; Batucada; When I Was Your Man by Bruno Mars
2012–2013	Feeling Good by Michael Bublé	Abou Simbel; Hassan Prince du Desert (from Zarafa) by Laurent Perez Del Mar; Yulunga; Serpent's Egg by Dead Can Dance; Belphegor (soundtrack)	Nyah by Hans Zimmer arranged by Maxime Rodriguez
2011–2012	Derniere lettre du Prince by Henri Torgue choreo. by Karine Arribert	Fever; Jessica's Theme (from Who Framed Roger Rabbit) by Alan Silvestri; Hey Pachuco (from The Mask) choreo. by Karine Arribert	Love Story by Francis Lai; Batucada
2010–2011	Forrest Gump by Alan Silvestri	Concertino pour guitare by Salvador Bacarisse; Talk to Her; Fiesta Flamenca	Fever by Beyoncé
2008–2009	Nocturne No. 21 by Frédéric Chopin	Nostalgia by Yanni	Abadou by Zap Mama
2007–2008	Nocturne No. 21 by Frédéric Chopin	Tangaria by Richard Galliano	

== Competitive highlights ==
- GP – Event of the ISU Grand Prix Series
- JGP – Event of the ISU Junior Grand Prix Series
- CS – Event of the ISU Challenger Series
- WD – Withdrew from competition
- C – Event was cancelled
- Medals at team events are awarded for the team results only. Individual placements at team events are listed in parentheses.

Competition placements at senior level
Season	2010–11	2011–12	2012–13	2013–14	2014–15	2015–16	2016–17	2017–18	2018–19	2019–20	2020–21	2021–22	2022–23	2023–24	2024–25
Winter Olympics				10th				19th							
Winter Olympics (Team event)				6th				8th							
World Championships	14th		11th	15th	10th	25th									
European Championships	9th	13th	10th	5th	6th	6th	16th	8th	7th	9th					
French Championships	3rd	2nd	2nd	1st	1st	1st	2nd	1st	1st	1st			4th		
World Team Trophy		4th (9th)	6th (8th)		6th (10th)		6th (12th)		4th (8th)						
GP France	9th	6th	5th	5th	5th	11th	7th	8th	8th	10th			8th		
GP NHK Trophy		7th							10th	11th					
GP Rostelecom Cup								11th							
GP Skate America	8th		6th	6th	9th										
GP Skate Canada														12th	
CS Autumn Classic								8th	3rd	7th					
CS Golden Spin of Zagreb													13th		
CS Nepela Memorial		1st											11th		
Challenge Cup			2nd						5th		4th				
Coupe du Printemps		3rd													
Egna Spring Trophy												5th			
Master's de Patinage	2nd	1st	2nd	1st	1st	WD	2nd	1st	2nd	2nd			4th	4th	
Mentor Toruń Cup						7th	2nd								
NRW Trophy			4th												
Trophée Métropole Nice	3rd	4th					1st						4th		
Winter Universiade					2nd				4th						

Competition placements at junior level
Season	2007–08	2008–09	2009–10
World Junior Championships		12th	
French Championships (Senior)	5th	2nd	2nd
JGP Croatia			6th
JGP France		8th	
JGP Great Britain		6th	
JGP Hungary			13th
Master's de Patinage		2nd S	1st J
Triglav Trophy			7th S

== Detailed results ==
ISU personal best scores in the +5/-5 GOE System
Segment	Type	Score	Event
Total	TSS	178.89	2018 CS Autumn Classic International
Short program	TSS	60.86	2018 Internationaux de France
Short program	TES	33.75	2018 Internationaux de France
Short program	PCS	29.40	2018 CS Autumn Classic International
Free skating	TSS	120.66	2018 CS Autumn Classic International
Free skating	TES	61.26	2018 NHK Trophy
Free skating	PCS	61.20	2018 CS Autumn Classic International

ISU personal best scores in the +3/-3 GOE System
Segment	Type	Score	Event
Total	TSS	174.53	2014 Winter Olympics
Short program	TSS	61.62	2014 World Championships
Short program	TES	33.10	2014 World Championships
Short program	PCS	28.52	2014 World Championships
Free skating	TSS	119.87	2016 Trophée de France
Free skating	TES	64.28	2016 Trophée de France
Free skating	PCS	58.20	2014 European Championships

- Medals at team events are awarded for the team results only. Individual placements at team events are listed in parentheses.

=== Senior level ===
Results in the 2009–10 season
Date	Event	SP		FS		Total	
Date	Event	P	Score	P	Score	P	Score
Dec 17–20, 2009	(France) 2009 French Championships	4	49.59	2	89.97	2	139.56
Mar 31 – Apr 4, 2010	(Slovenia) 2010 Triglav Trophy	5	48.32	7	76.39	7	124.71

Results in the 2010–11 season
Date	Event	SP		FS		Total	
Date	Event	P	Score	P	Score	P	Score
Sep 30 – Oct 2, 2010	(France) 2010 Master's de Patinage	2	46.62	2	88.99	2	135.61
Oct 13–17, 2010	(France) 2010 International Cup of Nice	3	49.44	4	92.06	3	141.50
Nov 11–14, 2010	(United States) 2010 Skate America	7	48.27	8	88.78	8	137.05
Nov 25–28, 2010	(France) 2010 Trophée Éric Bompard	11	41.69	7	95.39	9	137.08
Dec 17–19, 2010	(France) 2010 French Championships	2	47.28	2	93.94	3	141.22
Jan 24–30, 2011	(Switzerland) 2011 European Championships	7	51.61	10	87.13	9	138.74
Apr 25 – May 1, 2011	(Russia) 2011 World Championships	11	53.26	15	97.18	14	150.44

Results in the 2011–12 season
Date	Event	SP		FS		Total	
Date	Event	P	Score	P	Score	P	Score
Sep 28 – Oct 2, 2011	(Slovakia) 2011 Ondrej Nepela Memorial	1	47.90	2	88.68	1	136.58
Oct 6–8, 2011	(France) 2011 Master's de Patinage	1	54.81	3	96.53	1	151.34
Oct 26–30, 2011	(France) 2011 International Cup of Nice	9	45.08	3	90.37	4	135.45
Nov 10–13, 2011	(Japan) 2011 NHK Trophy	8	52.05	7	91.64	7	143.69
Nov 17–20, 2011	(France) 2011 Trophée Éric Bompard	6	50.49	6	94.95	6	145.44
Dec 16–18, 2011	(France) 2011 French Championships	2	50.20	1	99.13	2	149.33
Jan 23–29, 2012	(United Kingdom) 2012 European Championships	11	49.86	15	87.47	13	137.33
Mar 16–18, 2012	(Luxembourg) 2012 Coupe du Printemps	3	47.05	3	84.92	3	131.97
Apr 18–22, 2012	(Japan) 2012 World Team Trophy	11	48.57	9	95.58	4 (9)	144.15

Results in the 2012–13 season
Date	Event	SP		FS		Total	
Date	Event	P	Score	P	Score	P	Score
Oct 4–6, 2012	(France) 2012 Master's de Patinage	2	49.10	2	95.87	2	144.97
Oct 19–21, 2012	(United States) 2012 Skate America	4	54.41	7	101.54	6	155.95
Nov 15–18, 2012	(France) 2012 Trophée Éric Bompard	4	54.83	5	102.75	5	157.58
Dec 4–9, 2012	(Germany) 2012 NRW Trophy	3	54.56	5	101.83	4	156.39
Dec 13–16, 2012	(France) 2012 French Championships	1	54.19	2	99.29	2	153.48
Jan 23–27, 2013	(Croatia) 2013 European Championships	13	50.79	8	96.35	10	147.14
Feb 21–23, 2013	(Netherlands) 2013 International Challenge Cup	2	57.12	2	109.43	2	166.55
Mar 11–17, 2013	(Canada) 2013 World Championships	11	56.90	11	108.13	11	165.03
Apr 11–14, 2013	(Japan) 2013 World Team Trophy	6	58.51	9	101.20	6 (8)	159.71

Results in the 2013–14 season
Date	Event	SP		FS		Total	
Date	Event	P	Score	P	Score	P	Score
Oct 3–5, 2013	(France) 2013 Master's de Patinage	1	60.36	1	92.90	1	153.26
Oct 17–20, 2013	(United States) 2013 Skate America	7	55.84	6	111.51	6	167.35
Nov 15–17, 2013	(France) 2013 Trophée Éric Bompard	6	56.50	5	109.61	5	166.11
Dec 12–15, 2013	(France) 2013 French Championships	1	61.69	1	100.04	1	161.73
Jan 13–19, 2014	(Hungary) 2014 European Championships	5	58.64	4	114.73	5	173.37
Feb 6–9, 2014	(Russia) 2014 Winter Olympics (Team event)	6	55.45	–	–	6	–
Feb 19–20, 2014	(Russia) 2014 Winter Olympics	9	58.63	11	115.90	10	174.53
Mar 24–30, 2014	(Japan) 2014 World Championships	9	61.62	16	97.10	15	158.72

Results in the 2014–15 season
Date	Event	SP		FS		Total	
Date	Event	P	Score	P	Score	P	Score
Oct 2–4, 2014	(France) 2014 Master's de Patinage	1	60.35	1	106.36	1	166.71
Oct 23–26, 2014	(United States) 2014 Skate America	7	53.98	10	97.73	9	152.71
Nov 20–23, 2014	(France) 2014 Trophée Éric Bompard	5	57.61	5	111.85	5	169.46
Dec 18–21, 2014	(France) 2014 French Championships	1	60.30	1	102.84	1	163.14
Jan 26 – Feb 1, 2015	(Sweden) 2015 European Championships	7	55.84	9	100.63	6	156.47
Feb 4–14, 2015	(Spain) 2015 Winter Universiade	4	56.84	2	114.70	2	171.54
Mar 23–29, 2015	(China) 2015 World Championships	12	57.08	10	105.67	10	162.75
Apr 16–19, 2015	(Japan) 2015 World Team Trophy	11	52.06	10	90.77	6 (10)	142.83

Results in the 2015–16 season
Date	Event	SP		FS		Total	
Date	Event	P	Score	P	Score	P	Score
Oct 8–10, 2015	(France) 2015 Master's de Patinage	1	59.74	–	–	–	WD
Nov 13, 2015	(France) 2015 Trophée Éric Bompard	11	46.82	–	–	11	–
Dec 12–19, 2015	(France) 2015 French Championships	2	53.54	1	107.12	1	160.66
Jan 6–10, 2016	(Poland) 2016 Mentor Nestlé Nesquik Toruń Cup	3	51.66	10	83.93	7	135.59
Jan 25–31, 2016	(Slovakia) 2016 European Championships	8	57.35	6	103.88	6	161.23
Mar 26 – Apr 3, 2016	(United States) 2016 World Championships	25	49.50	–	–	25	49.50

Note: The 2015 Trophée Éric Bompard was cancelled after the November 2015 Paris attacks. The short programs had been completed on November 13, but the free skating was to be held the next day. On November 23, the International Skating Union announced that the short program results would be considered as the final results for the competition.

Results in the 2016–17 season
Date	Event	SP		FS		Total	
Date	Event	P	Score	P	Score	P	Score
Oct 6–8, 2016	(France) 2016 Master's de Patinage	1	62.65	2	115.81	2	178.46
Oct 19–23, 2016	(France) 2016 International Cup of Nice	3	57.65	1	111.60	1	169.25
Nov 10–13, 2016	2016 Trophée de France	11	52.78	5	119.87	7	172.65
Dec 15–17, 2016	(France) 2016 French Championships	2	52.81	3	92.79	2	145.60
Jan 10–15, 2017	(Poland) 2017 Mentor Cup	3	54.48	2	101.92	2	156.40
Jan 25–29, 2017	(Czech Republic) 2017 European Championships	12	54.96	19	90.11	16	145.07
Apr 20–23, 2017	(Japan) 2017 World Team Trophy	12	49.11	12	105.58	6 (12)	154.69

Results in the 2017–18 season
Date	Event	SP		FS		Total	
Date	Event	P	Score	P	Score	P	Score
Sep 20–23, 2017	(Canada) 2017 CS Autumn Classic International	8	49.65	8	91.76	8	141.41
Sep 28–30, 2017	(France) 2017 Master's de Patinage	2	48.66	1	113.50	1	162.16
Oct 20–22, 2017	(Russia) 2017 Rostelecom Cup	11	54.24	12	106.72	11	160.96
Nov 17–19, 2017	2017 Internationaux de France	8	58.96	9	112.44	8	171.40
Dec 14–16, 2017	(France) 2017 French Championships	1	63.79	1	119.21	1	183.00
Jan 15–21, 2018	(Russia) 2018 European Championships	10	54.14	10	105.56	8	159.70
Feb 9–12, 2018	(South Korea) 2018 Winter Olympics (Team event)	9	46.62	–	–	10	–
Feb 21–23, 2018	(South Korea) 2018 Winter Olympics	22	53.67	18	106.25	19	159.92

Results in the 2018–19 season
Date	Event	SP		FS		Total	
Date	Event	P	Score	P	Score	P	Score
Sep 20–22, 2018	(Canada) 2018 CS Autumn Classic International	3	58.23	3	120.66	3	178.89
Sep 25–27, 2018	(France) 2018 Master's de Patinage	2	61.85	2	120.63	2	182.48
Nov 9–11, 2018	(Japan) 2018 NHK Trophy	12	50.49	10	112.09	10	162.58
Nov 23–25, 2018	2018 Internationaux de France	7	60.86	8	107.16	8	168.02
Dec 13–15, 2018	(France) 2018 French Championships	1	66.58	1	119.88	1	186.46
Jan 21–27, 2019	(Belarus) 2019 European Championships	8	58.95	5	118.15	7	177.10
Feb 21–24, 2019	(Netherlands) 2019 International Challenge Cup	6	54.42	4	112.42	5	166.84
Mar 6–9, 2019	(Russia) 2019 Winter Universiade	6	62.73	5	116.83	4	179.56
Apr 11–14, 2019	(Japan) 2019 World Team Trophy	10	59.45	8	114.22	4 (8)	173.67

Results in the 2019–20 season
Date	Event	SP		FS		Total	
Date	Event	P	Score	P	Score	P	Score
Sep 12–14, 2019	(Canada) 2019 CS Autumn Classic International	7	53.03	7	99.51	7	152.54
Sep 26–28, 2019	(France) 2019 Master's de Patinage	2	58.67	2	114.11	2	172.78
Nov 1–3, 2019	2019 Internationaux de France	9	56.35	9	101.10	10	157.45
Nov 22–24, 2019	(Japan) 2019 NHK Trophy	11	49.77	7	110.21	11	159.98
Dec 19–21, 2019	(France) 2019 French Championships	1	59.44	1	107.46	1	166.90
Jan 24–25, 2020	(Austria) 2020 European Championships	8	60.64	10	111.44	9	172.08

Results in the 2020–21 season
Date	Event	SP		FS		Total	
Date	Event	P	Score	P	Score	P	Score
Feb 25–28, 2021	(Netherlands) 2021 International Challenge Cup	3	61.35	5	104.66	4	166.01

Results in the 2021–22 season
Date	Event	SP		FS		Total	
Date	Event	P	Score	P	Score	P	Score
Apr 9–10, 2022	(Italy) 2022 Egna Spring Trophy	5	53.15	5	88.98	5	142.13

Results in the 2022–23 season
Date	Event	SP		FS		Total	
Date	Event	P	Score	P	Score	P	Score
Sep 29 – Oct 1, 2022	(Slovakia) 2022 CS Nepela Memorial	12	41.00	11	79.77	11	120.77
Oct 6–8, 2022	(France) 2022 Master's de Patinage	4	47.65	4	102.54	4	150.19
Oct 18–23, 2022	(France) 2022 Trophée Métropole Nice Côte d'Azur	3	52.45	4	99.04	4	151.49
Nov 4–6, 2022	2022 Grand Prix de France	8	58.84	7	116.84	8	175.68
Dec 7–10, 2022	(Croatia) 2022 CS Golden Spin of Zagreb	18	46.86	11	99.39	13	146.25
Dec 15–17, 2022	(France) 2023 French Championships	3	52.98	4	107.22	4	160.20

Results in the 2023–24 season
Date	Event	SP		FS		Total	
Date	Event	P	Score	P	Score	P	Score
Sep 28–30, 2023	(France) 2023 Master's de Patinage	3	51.49	4	81.48	4	132.97
Oct 27–29, 2023	2023 Skate Canada International	12	41.65	12	79.48	12	121.13
