= 2025–26 ISU Grand Prix of Figure Skating =

Figure skating competition

- Type: Grand Prix
- Date: October 17 – December 7, 2025
- Season: 2025–26
- Previous: 2024–25 Grand Prix
- Next: 2026–27 Grand Prix

The 2025–26 Grand Prix of Figure Skating was a series of senior international competitions organized by the International Skating Union that were held from October to December 2025. The series included the 2025 Grand Prix de France, 2025 Cup of China, 2025 Skate Canada International, 2025 NHK Trophy, 2025 Skate America, and 2025 Finlandia Trophy. Medals were awarded in men's singles, women's singles, pair skating, and ice dance at each event. Skaters earned points based on their placements at each event and the top six skaters or teams in each discipline were invited to compete at the Grand Prix of Figure Skating Final in Nagoya, Japan. The corresponding series for junior-level skaters was the 2025–26 ISU Junior Grand Prix.

== Background ==
The ISU Grand Prix of Figure Skating is a series of senior-level international figure skating competitions sanctioned by the International Skating Union. The Grand Prix consists of six qualifying events, held in succession over a span of six weeks, plus the Grand Prix of Figure Skating Final. Currently, Grand Prix events are hosted by Canada (Skate Canada International), China (Cup of China), Finland (Grand Prix of Finland), France (Grand Prix de France), Japan (NHK Trophy), and the United States (Skate America). The 2025–26 series included the following events.

2025–26 Grand Prix competitions
Date	Event	Location	Ref.
October 17–19	2025 Grand Prix de France	Angers, France	
October 24–26	2025 Cup of China	Chongqing, China	
October 31 – November 2	2025 Skate Canada International	Saskatoon, Saskatchewan, Canada	
November 7–9	(Japan) 2025 NHK Trophy	Osaka, Japan	
November 14–16	(United States) 2025 Skate America	Lake Placid, New York, United States	
November 21–23	(Finland) 2025 Finlandia Trophy	Helsinki, Finland	
December 5–8	(Japan) 2025–26 Grand Prix Final	Nagoya, Japan	

== Assignments ==
The International Skating Union announced the preliminary assignments on June 6, 2025.

=== Men's singles ===
Men's assignments
Nation	Skater	Assignment(s)	
Azerbaijan	Vladimir Litvintsev	Cup of China	Skate America
Canada	Stephen Gogolev	Skate Canada International	Finlandia Trophy
Canada	Roman Sadovsky	Skate Canada International	Finlandia Trophy
China	Dai Daiwei	Cup of China	Skate America
China	Jin Boyang	Cup of China	NHK Trophy
Estonia	Mihhail Selevko	Grand Prix de France	Finlandia Trophy
France	Kévin Aymoz	Skate Canada International	Skate America
France	Luc Economides	Grand Prix de France	Skate America
France	François Pitot	Grand Prix de France	NHK Trophy
France	Adam Siao Him Fa	Grand Prix de France	Finlandia Trophy
Georgia	Nika Egadze	Grand Prix de France	Skate Canada International
Italy	Gabriele Frangipani	Grand Prix de France	NHK Trophy
Italy	Daniel Grassl	Cup of China	Skate America
Italy	Nikolaj Memola	Skate Canada International	Skate America
Italy	Matteo Rizzo	NHK Trophy	Finlandia Trophy
Japan	Yuma Kagiyama	NHK Trophy	Finlandia Trophy
Japan	Kao Miura	Grand Prix de France	Skate Canada International
Japan	Shun Sato	Cup of China	NHK Trophy
Japan	Kazuki Tomono	Skate Canada International	Skate America
Japan	Tatsuya Tsuboi	Grand Prix de France	Skate America
Japan	Sōta Yamamoto	Cup of China	Finlandia Trophy
Kazakhstan	Mikhail Shaidorov	Cup of China	Skate America
Latvia	Deniss Vasiļjevs	Cup of China	Finlandia Trophy
South Korea	Cha Jun-hwan	Cup of China	NHK Trophy
Switzerland	Lukas Britschgi	Grand Prix de France	NHK Trophy
United States	Jason Brown	Skate America	Finlandia Trophy
United States	Tomoki Hiwatashi	Cup of China	Skate Canada International
United States	Jimmy Ma	NHK Trophy	Finlandia Trophy
United States	Ilia Malinin	Grand Prix de France	Skate Canada International
United States	Andrew Torgashev	Grand Prix de France	NHK Trophy
Canada	Aleksa Rakic	Skate Canada International	
China	Peng Zhiming	Cup of China	
Estonia	Aleksandr Selevko	Skate Canada International	
Finland	Valtter Virtanen	Finlandia Trophy	
Italy	Corey Circelli	Skate America	
Japan	Haru Kakiuchi	NHK Trophy	
Poland	Vladimir Samoilov	Skate Canada International	
Slovakia	Adam Hagara	NHK Trophy	
Sweden	Andreas Nordeback	Finlandia Trophy	
United States	Liam Kapeikis	Skate America	
United States	Maxim Naumov	Grand Prix de France	
United States	Jacob Sanchez	Cup of China	

=== Women's singles ===
Women's assignments
Nation	Skater	Assignment(s)	
Belgium	Loena Hendrickx	NHK Trophy	Finlandia Trophy
Canada	Madeline Schizas	Skate Canada International	Finlandia Trophy
France	Lorine Schild	Grand Prix de France	Finlandia Trophy
France	Léa Serna	Grand Prix de France	Skate America
Georgia	Anastasiia Gubanova	Cup of China	Skate America
Italy	Lara Naki Gutmann	Skate Canada International	Skate America
Italy	Anna Pezzetta	Cup of China	NHK Trophy
Japan	Yuna Aoki	Skate Canada International	NHK Trophy
Japan	Mone Chiba	Skate Canada International	Finlandia Trophy
Japan	Wakaba Higuchi	NHK Trophy	Skate America
Japan	Rino Matsuike	Cup of China	Finlandia Trophy
Japan	Ami Nakai	Grand Prix de France	Skate Canada International
Japan	Kaori Sakamoto	Grand Prix de France	NHK Trophy
Japan	Rion Sumiyoshi	Grand Prix de France	Finlandia Trophy
Japan	Rinka Watanabe	Cup of China	Skate America
Japan	Hana Yoshida	Cup of China	Skate America
South Korea	Kim Chae-yeon	Grand Prix de France	Skate America
South Korea	Lee Hae-in	Cup of China	Skate America
South Korea	Shin Ji-a	Grand Prix de France	Cup of China
South Korea	You Young	Grand Prix de France	NHK Trophy
South Korea	Yun Ah-sun	Skate Canada International	NHK Trophy
Switzerland	Livia Kaiser	Grand Prix de France	NHK Trophy
United States	Sarah Everhardt	Skate Canada International	NHK Trophy
United States	Amber Glenn	Cup of China	Finlandia Trophy
United States	Isabeau Levito	Grand Prix de France	Skate Canada International
United States	Elyce Lin-Gracey	Grand Prix de France	NHK Trophy
United States	Alysa Liu	Cup of China	Skate America
United States	Bradie Tennell	Skate Canada International	Finlandia Trophy
China	Zhang Ruiyang	Cup of China	
China	Zhu Yi	Cup of China	
Canada	Sara Maude Dupuis	Skate Canada International	
Canada	Katherine Medland Spence	NHK Trophy	
Canada	Uliana Shiryaeva	Skate Canada International	
Finland	Iida Karhunen	Finlandia Trophy	
Finland	Olivia Lisko	Finlandia Trophy	
Finland	Selma Välitalo	Finlandia Trophy	
France	Clémence Mayindu	Grand Prix de France	
Israel	Mariia Seniuk	Skate Canada International	
Kazakhstan	Sofia Samodelkina	NHK Trophy	
Poland	Ekaterina Kurakova	Skate America	
United States	Starr Andrews	Skate America	
United States	Josephine Lee	Skate America	

=== Pairs ===
Pairs assignments
Nation	Team	Assignment(s)	
Canada	Kelly Ann Laurin; Loucas Éthier	Skate Canada International	Skate America
Canada	Lia Pereira; Trennt Michaud	Skate Canada International	Finlandia Trophy
Canada	Deanna Stellato-Dudek; Maxime Deschamps	Grand Prix de France	Skate Canada International
China	Sui Wenjing; Han Cong	Cup of China	NHK Trophy
China	Zhang Jiaxuan; Huang Yihang	Cup of China	Finlandia Trophy
France	Camille Kovalev; Pavel Kovalev	Grand Prix de France	NHK Trophy
Georgia	Anastasiia Metelkina; Luka Berulava	Cup of China	Skate America
Germany	Minerva Fabienne Hase; Nikita Volodin	Skate Canada International	Finlandia Trophy
Germany	Annika Hocke; Robert Kunkel	Cup of China	Skate America
Hungary	Maria Pavlova; Alexei Sviatchenko	Grand Prix de France	NHK Trophy
Italy	Sara Conti; Niccolò Macii	Cup of China	NHK Trophy
Italy	Rebecca Ghilardi; Filippo Ambrosini	Cup of China	Finlandia Trophy
Japan	Riku Miura; Ryuichi Kihara	Grand Prix de France	Skate America
Japan	Yuna Nagaoka; Sumitada Moriguchi	NHK Trophy	Finlandia Trophy
Poland	Ioulia Chtchetinina; Michał Woźniak	Skate Canada International	Finlandia Trophy
United States	Emily Chan; Spencer Akira Howe	NHK Trophy	Skate America
United States	Alisa Efimova; Misha Mitrofanov	NHK Trophy	Finlandia Trophy
United States	Ellie Kam; Daniel O'Shea	Skate Canada International	Finlandia Trophy
United States	Katie McBeath; Daniil Parkman	Grand Prix de France	Cup of China
Armenia	Karina Akopova; Nikita Rakhmanin	Skate America	
France	Aurélie Faula; Théo Belle	Grand Prix de France	
France	Megan Wessenberg; Denys Strekalin	Grand Prix de France	
Great Britain	Anastasia Vaipan-Law; Luke Digby	Skate Canada International	
Netherlands	Daria Danilova; Michel Tsiba	NHK Trophy	
Switzerland	Oxana Vouillamoz; Tom Bouvart	Skate Canada International	
United States	Olivia Flores; Luke Wang	Skate America	
United States	Valentina Plazas; Maximiliano Fernandez	Skate America	
United States	Audrey Shin; Balázs Nagy	Grand Prix de France	

=== Ice dance ===
Ice dance assignments
Nation	Team	Assignment(s)	
Canada	Alicia Fabbri; Paul Ayer	NHK Trophy	Skate America
Canada	Piper Gilles; Paul Poirier	Skate Canada International	Finlandia Trophy
Canada	Marjorie Lajoie; Zachary Lagha	Skate Canada International	Skate America
Canada	Marie-Jade Lauriault; Romain Le Gac	Grand Prix de France	Skate Canada International
Czech Republic	Kateřina Mrázková; Daniel Mrázek	Skate Canada International	Skate America
Czech Republic	Natálie Taschlerová; Filip Taschler	NHK Trophy	Finlandia Trophy
Finland	Yuka Orihara; Juho Pirinen	NHK Trophy	Finlandia Trophy
France	Loïcia Demougeot; Théo le Mercier	Cup of China	Skate America
France	Laurence Fournier Beaudry; Guillaume Cizeron	Grand Prix de France	Finlandia Trophy
France	Célina Fradji; Jean-Hans Fourneaux	Grand Prix de France	Skate America
France	Evgenia Lopareva; Geoffrey Brissaud	Cup of China	Skate America
Georgia	Diana Davis; Gleb Smolkin	Grand Prix de France	Finlandia Trophy
Germany	Jennifer Janse van Rensburg; Benjamin Steffan	Skate Canada International	NHK Trophy
Great Britain	Lilah Fear; Lewis Gibson	Grand Prix de France	NHK Trophy
Great Britain	Phebe Bekker; James Hernandez	Skate America	Finlandia Trophy
Italy	Charlène Guignard; Marco Fabbri	Grand Prix de France	NHK Trophy
Lithuania	Allison Reed; Saulius Ambrulevičius	Grand Prix de France	Skate Canada International
South Korea	Hannah Lim; Ye Quan	Cup of China	Skate Canada International
Spain	Olivia Smart; Tim Dieck	Cup of China	Finlandia Trophy
United States	Emily Bratti; Ian Somerville	Grand Prix de France	Skate Canada International
United States	Oona Brown; Gage Brown	Skate America	Finlandia Trophy
United States	Christina Carreira; Anthony Ponomarenko	Skate Canada International	Skate America
United States	Madison Chock; Evan Bates	Cup of China	Skate America
United States	Caroline Green; Michael Parsons	Cup of China	NHK Trophy
United States	Maia Shibutani; Alex Shibutani	NHK Trophy	Finlandia Trophy
United States	Emilea Zingas; Vadym Kolesnik	Cup of China	Finlandia Trophy
China	Ren Junfei; Xing Jianing	Cup of China	
China	Wang Shiyue; Liu Xinyu	Cup of China	
China	Xiao Zixi; He Linghao	Cup of China	
France	Natacha Lagouge; Arnaud Caffa	Grand Prix de France	
Japan	Utana Yoshida; Masaya Morita	NHK Trophy	
United States	Leah Neset; Artem Markelov	Skate Canada International	
United States	Eva Pate; Logan Bye	Grand Prix de France	
United States	Katarina Wolfkostin; Dimitry Tsarevski	NHK Trophy	

=== Changes to preliminary assignments ===
==== Grand Prix de France ====
Changes to preliminary assignments (Grand Prix de France)
Discipline	Withdrew		Added		Notes	Ref.
Discipline	Date	Skater(s)	Date	Skater(s)	Notes	Ref.
Men	—N/a		July 30	(France); François Pitot	Host picks	
Women	—N/a		July 30	(France); Léa Serna	Host picks	
Pairs	—N/a		July 30	(France); Camille Kovalev; Pavel Kovalev	Host picks	
Women	—N/a		September 2	(France); Clémence Mayindu	Host picks	
Pairs	—N/a		September 2	(France); Megan Wessenberg; Denys Strekalin	Host picks	
Ice dance	—N/a		September 2	(France); Célina Fradji; Jean-Hans Fourneaux	Host picks	
Ice dance	—N/a		September 2	(France); Natacha Lagouge; Arnaud Caffa	Host picks	
Pairs	September 29	(Australia); Anastasia Golubeva; Hektor Giotopoulos Moore	September 29	(United States); Katie McBeath; Daniil Parkman	—N/a	
Women	October 7	(Estonia); Niina Petrõkina	October 9	(South Korea); Shin Ji-a	Medical reasons (Petrõkina)	

==== Cup of China ====
Changes to preliminary assignments (Cup of China)
Discipline	Withdrew		Added		Notes	Ref.
Discipline	Date	Skater(s)	Date	Skater(s)	Notes	Ref.
Pairs	August 13	(Uzbekistan); Ekaterina Geynish; Dmitrii Chigirev	August 14	(Italy); Lucrezia Beccari; Matteo Guarise	—N/a	
Men	—N/a		August 18	(China); Peng Zhiming	Host picks	
Women	—N/a		August 18	(China); An Xiangyi	Host picks	
Women	—N/a		August 18	(China); Zhang Ruiyang	Host picks	
Pairs	—N/a		August 18	(China); Zhang Jiaxuan; Huang Yihang	Host picks	
Ice dance	—N/a		August 18	(China); Wang Shiyue; Liu Xinyu	Host picks	
Pairs	—N/a		August 22	(Italy); Rebecca Ghilardi; Filippo Ambrosini	—N/a	
Pairs	September 24	(Canada); Fiona Bombardier; Benjamin Mimar	September 25	(Germany); Annika Hocke; Robert Kunkel	—N/a	
Men	October 13	(United States); Camden Pulkinen	October 14	(United States); Tomoki Hiwatashi	Injury (Pulkinen)	
Women	October 14	(Switzerland); Kimmy Repond	October 15	(Italy); Anna Pezzetta	Injury (Repond)	
Women	October 21	(China); An Xiangyi	—N/a		Injury (An)	

==== Skate Canada International ====
Changes to preliminary assignments (Skate Canada International)
Discipline	Withdrew		Added		Notes	Ref.
Discipline	Date	Skater(s)	Date	Skater(s)	Notes	Ref.
Men	September 10	(United States); Lucas Broussard	September 21	(United States); Tomoki Hiwatashi	—N/a	
Women	—N/a		September 15	(Canada); Uliana Shiryaeva	Host picks	
Ice dance	—N/a		September 15	(Canada); Marie-Jade Lauriault; Romain Le Gac	Host picks	
Pairs	October 6	(Australia); Anastasia Golubeva; Hektor Giotopoulos Moore	October 7	(Poland); Ioulia Chtchetinina; Michał Woźniak	—N/a	
Women	October 16	(Belgium); Nina Pinzarrone	October 28	(Israel); Mariia Seniuk	Injury (Pinzarrone)	
Ice dance	October 23	(Finland); Juulia Turkkila; Matthias Versluis	October 27	(South Korea); Hannah Lim; Ye Quan	Injury (Versluis)	

==== NHK Trophy ====
Changes to preliminary assignments (NHK Trophy)
Discipline	Withdrew		Added		Notes	Ref.
Discipline	Date	Skater(s)	Date	Skater(s)	Notes	Ref.
Ice dance	July 11	(Japan); Azusa Tanaka; Shingo Nishiyama	July 29	(Germany); Jennifer Janse van Rensburg; Benjamin Steffan	Retirement (Tanaka)	
Men	—N/a		September 14	(Japan); Haru Kakiuchi	Host picks	
Women	—N/a		September 15	(Japan); Yuna Aoki	Host picks	
Pairs	—N/a		September 15	(Japan); Yuna Nagaoka; Sumitada Moriguchi	Host picks	
Women	October 14	(Switzerland); Kimmy Repond	October 15	(Switzerland); Livia Kaiser	Injury (Repond)	
Women	October 16	(Belgium); Nina Pinzarrone	October 21	(South Korea); Yun Ah-sun	Injury (Pinzarrone)	

==== Skate America ====
Changes to preliminary assignments (Skate America)
Discipline	Withdrew		Added		Notes	Ref.
Discipline	Date	Skater(s)	Date	Skater(s)	Notes	Ref.
Women	—N/a		July 14	(United States); Starr Andrews	Host picks	
Women	—N/a		July 14	(United States); Josephine Lee	Host picks	
Pairs	September 2	(Uzbekistan); Ekaterina Geynish; Dmitrii Chigirev	September 15	(Italy); Lucrezia Beccari; Matteo Guarise	—N/a	
Men	—N/a		September 15	(United States); Liam Kapeikis	Host picks	
Pairs	—N/a		September 15	(United States); Audrey Shin; Balázs Nagy	Host picks	
Ice dance	—N/a		September 15	(United States); Oona Brown; Gage Brown	Host picks	
Ice dance	October 28	(Italy); Noemi Maria Tali; Noah Lafornara	November 3	(Canada); Alicia Fabbri; Paul Ayer	Injury (Lafornara)	
Pairs	November 7	(Italy); Lucrezia Beccari; Matteo Guarise	November 10	(Armenia); Karina Akopova; Nikita Rakhmanin	—N/a	
Pairs	November 9	(United States); Audrey Shin; Balázs Nagy	November 9	(United States); Emily Chan; Spencer Akira Howe	—N/a	

==== Finlandia Trophy ====
Changes to preliminary assignments (Finlandia Trophy)
Discipline	Withdrew		Added		Notes	Ref.
Discipline	Date	Skater(s)	Date	Skater(s)	Notes	Ref.
Men	—N/a		September 15	(Finland); Valtter Virtanen	Host picks	
Women	—N/a		September 15	(Finland); Olivia Lisko	Host picks	
Women	—N/a		September 15	(Finland); Selma Välitalo	Host picks	
Men	October 13	(United States); Lucas Broussard	October 15	(Canada); Stephen Gogolev	—N/a	
Women	November 10	(Estonia); Niina Petrõkina			Injury (Petrõkina)	
Ice dance	November 13	(Finland); Juulia Turkkila; Matthias Versluis	November 14	(United Kingdom); Phebe Bekker; James Hernandez	Injury (Versluis)	

== Medal summary ==
Grand Prix de France medalists
Event	Discipline	Gold	Silver	Bronze
Grand Prix de France	Men	(United States) Ilia Malinin	(France) Adam Siao Him Fa	(Georgia (country)) Nika Egadze
Grand Prix de France	Women	(Japan) Ami Nakai	(Japan) Kaori Sakamoto	(Japan) Rion Sumiyoshi
Grand Prix de France	Pairs	(Japan); Riku Miura; Ryuichi Kihara	(Canada); Deanna Stellato-Dudek; Maxime Deschamps	(Hungary); Maria Pavlova; Alexei Sviatchenko
Grand Prix de France	Ice dance	(France); Laurence Fournier Beaudry; Guillaume Cizeron	(United Kingdom); Lilah Fear; Lewis Gibson	(Lithuania); Allison Reed; Saulius Ambrulevičius

Cup of China medalists
Event	Discipline	Gold	Silver	Bronze
Cup of China	Men	(Japan) Shun Sato	(Italy) Daniel Grassl	(Kazakhstan) Mikhail Shaidorov
Cup of China	Women	(United States) Amber Glenn	(United States) Alysa Liu	(Japan) Rinka Watanabe
Cup of China	Pairs	(Georgia (country)); Anastasiia Metelkina; Luka Berulava	(Italy); Sara Conti; Niccolò Macii	(China); Sui Wenjing; Han Cong
Cup of China	Ice dance	(United States); Madison Chock; Evan Bates	(United States); Emilea Zingas; Vadym Kolesnik	(France); Evgeniia Lopareva; Geoffrey Brissaud

Skate Canada International medalists
Event	Discipline	Gold	Silver	Bronze
Skate Canada International	Men	(United States) Ilia Malinin	(Estonia) Aleksandr Selevko	(Japan) Kao Miura
Skate Canada International	Women	(Japan) Mone Chiba	(United States) Isabeau Levito	(Japan) Ami Nakai
Skate Canada International	Pairs	(Canada); Deanna Stellato-Dudek; Maxime Deschamps	(Germany); Minerva Fabienne Hase; Nikita Volodin	(United States); Ellie Kam; Daniel O'Shea
Skate Canada International	Ice dance	(Canada); Piper Gilles; Paul Poirier	(Lithuania); Allison Reed; Saulius Ambrulevičius	(Canada); Marjorie Lajoie; Zachary Lagha

NHK Trophy medalists
Event	Discipline	Gold	Silver	Bronze
(Japan) 2025 NHK Trophy	Men	(Japan) Yuma Kagiyama	(Japan) Shun Sato	(Switzerland) Lukas Britschgi
(Japan) 2025 NHK Trophy	Women	(Japan) Kaori Sakamoto	(Kazakhstan) Sofia Samodelkina	(Belgium) Loena Hendrickx
(Japan) 2025 NHK Trophy	Pairs	(Italy); Sara Conti; Niccolò Macii	(Hungary); Maria Pavlova; Alexei Sviatchenko	(China); Sui Wenjing; Han Cong
(Japan) 2025 NHK Trophy	Ice dance	(United Kingdom); Lilah Fear; Lewis Gibson	(Italy); Charlène Guignard; Marco Fabbri	(United States); Caroline Green; Michael Parsons

Skate America medalists
Event	Discipline	Gold	Silver	Bronze
(United States) 2025 Skate America	Men	(France); Kévin Aymoz	(Kazakhstan) Mikhail Shaidorov	(Japan); Kazuki Tomono
(United States) 2025 Skate America	Women	(United States); Alysa Liu	(Japan); Rinka Watanabe	(Georgia (country)); Anastasiia Gubanova
(United States) 2025 Skate America	Pairs	(Japan); Riku Miura; Ryuichi Kihara	(Georgia (country)); Anastasiia Metelkina; Luka Berulava	(Canada); Kelly Ann Laurin; Loucas Éthier
(United States) 2025 Skate America	Ice dance	(United States); Madison Chock; Evan Bates	(Canada); Marjorie Lajoie; Zachary Lagha	(France); Evgeniia Lopareva; Geoffrey Brissaud

Finlandia Trophy medalists
Event	Discipline	Gold	Silver	Bronze
(Finland) 2025 Finlandia Trophy	Men	(Japan); Yuma Kagiyama	(France); Adam Siao Him Fa	(Canada); Stephen Gogolev
(Finland) 2025 Finlandia Trophy	Women	(Japan); Mone Chiba	(United States); Amber Glenn	(Japan); Rino Matsuike
(Finland) 2025 Finlandia Trophy	Pairs	(Germany); Minerva Fabienne Hase; Nikita Volodin	(United States); Alisa Efimova; Misha Mitrofanov	(United States); Ellie Kam; Daniel O'Shea
(Finland) 2025 Finlandia Trophy	Ice dance	(France); Laurence Fournier Beaudry; Guillaume Cizeron	(Canada); Piper Gilles; Paul Poirier	(United States); Emilea Zingas; Vadym Kolesnik

Grand Prix Final medalists
Event	Discipline	Gold	Silver	Bronze
(Japan) 2025–26 Grand Prix of Figure Skating Final	Men	(United States); Ilia Malinin	(Japan); Yuma Kagiyama	(Japan); Shun Sato
(Japan) 2025–26 Grand Prix of Figure Skating Final	Women	(United States); Alysa Liu	(Japan); Ami Nakai	(Japan); Kaori Sakamoto
(Japan) 2025–26 Grand Prix of Figure Skating Final	Pairs	(Japan); Riku Miura; Ryuichi Kihara	(Italy); Sara Conti; Niccolò Macii	(Germany); Minerva Fabienne Hase; Nikita Volodin
(Japan) 2025–26 Grand Prix of Figure Skating Final	Ice dance	(United States); Madison Chock; Evan Bates	(France); Laurence Fournier Beaudry; Guillaume Cizeron	(United Kingdom); Lilah Fear; Lewis Gibson

=== Medal standings ===
Total medals earned at the 2025–26 Grand Prix series
Rank	Nation	Gold	Silver	Bronze	Total
1	Japan	10	5	8	23
2	United States	9	5	4	18
3	France	3	3	2	8
4	Canada	2	3	3	8
5	Italy	1	4	0	5
6	Georgia	1	1	2	4
7	Germany	1	1	1	3
7	Great Britain	1	1	1	3
9	Kazakhstan	0	2	1	3
10	Hungary	0	1	1	2
10	Lithuania	0	1	1	2
12	Estonia	0	1	0	1
13	China	0	0	2	2
14	Belgium	0	0	1	1
14	Switzerland	0	0	1	1
Totals (15 entries)		28	28	28	84

== Qualification ==
At each event, skaters earn points toward qualifying for the Grand Prix Final. The points earned per placement are as follows:

Points earned per placement at a Grand Prix event
Placement	Points earned
1st	15
2nd	13
3rd	11
4th	9
5th	7
6th	5
7th	4
8th	3

=== Qualification standings ===
2025 Grand Prix qualifications
Pts.	Men	Women	Pairs	Ice dance
30	(United States); Ilia Malinin	(Japan); Mone Chiba	(Japan); Riku Miura; Ryuichi Kihara	(United States); Madison Chock; Evan Bates
30	(Japan); Yuma Kagiyama	—N/a		(France); Laurence Fournier Beaudry; Guillaume Cizeron
28	(Japan); Shun Sato	(Japan); Kaori Sakamoto	(Italy); Sara Conti; Niccolò Macii	(United Kingdom); Lilah Fear; Lewis Gibson
28	—N/a	(United States); Amber Glenn	(Germany); Minerva Fabienne Hase; Nikita Volodin	(Canada); Piper Gilles; Paul Poirier
28	—N/a	(United States); Alysa Liu	(Georgia (country)); Anastasiia Metelkina; Luka Berulava	—N/a
28	—N/a	—N/a	(Canada); Deanna Stellato-Dudek; Maxime Deschamps	—N/a
26	(France); Adam Siao Him Fa	(Japan); Ami Nakai	—N/a	
24	(Kazakhstan); Mikhail Shaidorov	(Japan); Rinka Watanabe	(Hungary); Maria Pavlova; Alexei Sviatchenko	(Lithuania); Allison Reed; Saulius Ambrulevičius
24	—N/a			(United States); Emilea Zingas; Vadym Kolesnik
24	—N/a			(Canada); Marjorie Lajoie; Zachary Lagha
22	—N/a	(United States); Isabeau Levito	(China); Sui Wenjing; Han Cong	(Italy); Charlène Guignard; Marco Fabbri
22	—N/a	—N/a	(United States); Ellie Kam; Daniel O'Shea	(France); Evgeniia Lopareva; Geoffrey Brissaud
20	(Italy); Daniel Grassl	(Georgia (country)); Anastasiia Gubanova	(United States); Alisa Efimova; Misha Mitrofanov	—N/a
20	(Japan); Kazuki Tomono	—N/a		—N/a
20	(Switzerland); Lukas Britschgi	—N/a		—N/a
18	(Georgia (country)); Nika Egadze	(United States); Bradie Tennell	(Canada); Kelly Ann Laurin; Loucas Éthier	(Spain); Olivia Smart; Tim Dieck
18	—N/a		(Japan); Yuna Nagaoka; Sumitada Moriguchi	—N/a
16	(United States); Jason Brown	(Japan); Rino Matsuike	(Canada); Lia Pereira; Trennt Michaud	(United States); Christina Carreira; Anthony Ponomarenko
16	(China); Jin Boyang	(Italy); Lara Naki Gutmann	—N/a	
15	(France); Kévin Aymoz	(Japan); Rion Sumiyoshi	—N/a	
14	(Canada); Stephen Gogolev	—N/a	(China); Zhang Jiaxuan; Huang Yihang	(France); Loïcia Demougeot; Théo le Mercier
14	—N/a	—N/a	(United States); Emily Chan; Spencer Akira Howe	—N/a
13	(Estonia); Aleksandr Selevko	(Kazakhstan); Sofia Samodelkina	—N/a	
13	(Canada); Roman Sadovsky	—N/a	—N/a	
12	—N/a		(Germany); Annika Hocke; Robert Kunkel	(Georgia (country)); Diana Davis; Gleb Smolkin
12	—N/a		—N/a	(South Korea); Hannah Lim; Ye Quan
12	—N/a		—N/a	(United States); Maia Shibutani; Alex Shibutani
11	(Japan); Kao Miura	(Belgium); Loena Hendrickx	—N/a	(United States); Caroline Green; Michael Parsons
11	—N/a	(South Korea); Shin Ji-a	—N/a	—N/a
11	—N/a	(United States); Sarah Everhardt	—N/a	—N/a
10	(France); François Pitot	(France); Lorine Schild	—N/a	
10	(South Korea); Cha Jun-hwan	(South Korea); Kim Chae-yeon	—N/a	
10	(Azerbaijan); Vladimir Litvintsev	(Japan); Yuna Aoki	—N/a	
9	(United States); Tomoki Hiwatashi	(South Korea); You Young	(United States); Katie McBeath; Daniil Parkman	(Czech Republic); Natálie Taschlerová; Filip Taschler
9	(Italy); Nikolaj Memola	—N/a		
8	(Italy); Matteo Rizzo	—N/a		
7	(Japan); Tatsuya Tsuboi	(Canada); Madeline Schizas	(Italy); Rebecca Ghilardi; Filippo Ambrosini	(Czech Republic); Kateřina Mrázková; Daniel Mrázek
7	—N/a	(United States); Starr Andrews	(United States); Audrey Shin; Balázs Nagy	(United States); Katarina Wolfkostin; Dimitry Tsarevski
6	(Estonia); Mihhail Selevko	(Italy); Anna Pezzetta	—N/a	
5	(Japan); Sōta Yamamoto	(Finland); Iida Karhunen	(Armenia); Karina Akopova; Nikita Rakhmanin	(Canada); Marie-Jade Lauriault; Romain Le Gac
5	(United States); Andrew Torgashev	—N/a	(United Kingdom); Anastasia Vaipan-Law; Luke Digby	(United States); Oona Brown; Gage Brown
5	(Slovakia); Adam Hagara	—N/a	(France); Camille Kovalev; Pavel Kovalev	—N/a
4	(United States); Jacob Sanchez	(South Korea); Yun Ah-sun	—N/a	
4	—N/a	(France); Léa Serna	—N/a	
4	—N/a	(China); Zhang Ruiyang	—N/a	
3	—N/a	(South Korea); Lee Hae-in	—N/a	
3	—N/a	(United States); Elyce Lin-Gracey	—N/a	
3	—N/a	(Israel); Mariia Seniuk	—N/a	

=== Qualifiers ===
No.	Men	Women	Pairs	Ice dance
1	(United States); Ilia Malinin	(Japan); Mone Chiba	(Japan); Riku Miura; Ryuichi Kihara	(United States); Madison Chock; Evan Bates
2	(Japan); Yuma Kagiyama	(Japan); Kaori Sakamoto	(Italy); Sara Conti; Niccolò Macii	(France); Laurence Fournier Beaudry; Guillaume Cizeron
3	(Japan); Shun Sato	(United States); Amber Glenn	(Germany); Minerva Fabienne Hase; Nikita Volodin	(United Kingdom); Lilah Fear; Lewis Gibson
4	(France); Adam Siao Him Fa	(United States); Alysa Liu	(Georgia (country)); Anastasiia Metelkina; Luka Berulava	(Canada); Piper Gilles; Paul Poirier
5	(Kazakhstan); Mikhail Shaidorov	(Japan); Ami Nakai	(Canada); Deanna Stellato-Dudek; Maxime Deschamps	(Lithuania); Allison Reed; Saulius Ambrulevičius
6	(Italy); Daniel Grassl	(Japan); Rinka Watanabe	(Hungary); Maria Pavlova; Alexei Sviatchenko	(United States); Emilea Zingas; Vadym Kolesnik

Alternates

No.	Men	Women	Pairs	Ice dance
1	(Japan); Kazuki Tomono	(United States); Isabeau Levito	(China); Sui Wenjing; Han Cong	(Canada); Marjorie Lajoie; Zachary Lagha
2	(Switzerland); Lukas Britschgi	(Georgia (country)); Anastasiia Gubanova	(United States); Ellie Kam; Daniel O'Shea	(Italy); Charlène Guignard; Marco Fabbri
3	(Georgia (country)); Nika Egadze	(United States); Bradie Tennell	(United States); Alisa Efimova; Misha Mitrofanov	(France); Evgeniia Lopareva; Geoffrey Brissaud
