= Romain Le Gac =

French-Canadian ice dancer (born 1995)

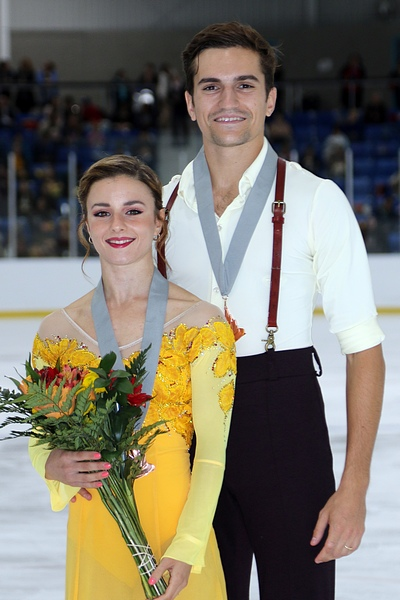
- Marie-Jade Lauriault and Romain Le Gac at the 2019 Autumn Classic International

Personal information
- Born: 31 May 1995 (age 31) Nogent-sur-Marne, France
- Home town: Sainte-Anne-des-Plaines, Canada
- Height: 1.78 m (5 ft 10 in)

Figure skating career
- Country: Canada (since 2021); France (2010–20)
- Discipline: Ice dance
- Partner: Marie-Jade Lauriault
- Coach: Scott Moir; Madison Hubbell; Adrián Díaz; Romain Haguenauer; Patrice Lauzon; Pascal Denis; Marie-France Dubreuil; Josée Piché; Benjamin Brisebois
- Skating club: Patinage Laval
- Began skating: 2001

Medal record
Representing Canada
Canadian Championships
| Silver medal – second place | 2024 Calgary | Ice dance |
| Bronze medal – third place | 2023 Oshawa | Ice dance |
Representing France
French Championships
| Silver medal – second place | 2015 Megève | Ice dance |
| Silver medal – second place | 2017 Caen | Ice dance |
| Silver medal – second place | 2018 Nantes | Ice dance |
| Silver medal – second place | 2019 Vaujany | Ice dance |
Winter Youth Olympics
| Bronze medal – third place | 2012 Innsbruck | Team |

Romain Le Gac (born 31 May 1995) is a French-Canadian ice dancer who currently represents Canada. With his partner and wife Marie-Jade Lauriault, he is the 2022 Skate America bronze medallist, a four-time Challenger Series medallist, and a three-time Canadian national medallist. He represented Canada at the 2026 Winter Olympics.

Lauriault and Le Gac initially represented his birth country of France upon partnering in 2014, where they were four-time French national silver medallists (2015-19), four-time Challenger Series medallists and the 2016 French junior national champions, and represented France at the 2018 Winter Olympics before switching to represent Canada in the summer of 2021.

He previously competed with Estelle Elizabeth, with whom he is a two-time French junior national champion (2012, 2014) and a 2012 Winter Youth Olympics bronze medallist in the team event.

== Personal life ==
Romain Le Gac was born on 31 May 1995 in Nogent-sur-Marne, France. He moved to Montreal, Quebec, Canada in July 2014. He married Marie-Jade Lauriault in December 2015. He has expressed interest in working as an osteopath.

== Career ==
=== Early career ===
Le Gac began skating in 2001. Disliking jumps, he switched from singles to ice dancing two years later.

Le Gac debuted on the junior international level with Estelle Elizabeth in the 2010–11 season. In January 2012, they represented France at the Winter Youth Olympics in Innsbruck, Austria, placing sixth in the short dance, fifth in the free dance, and fifth overall. They won bronze in the team event.

Elizabeth/Le Gac finished fifteenth at the 2013 World Junior Championships in Milan after ranking thirteenth in the short and eighteenth in the free dance. They placed eleventh in both segments and eleventh overall at the 2014 World Junior Championships in Sofia, Bulgaria. They were coached by Muriel Boucher-Zazoui, Romain Haguenauer, and Olivier Schoenfelder in Lyon. Their partnership ended around July 2014 due to personal problems.

=== 2014–15 season: Debut of Lauriault/Le Gac ===
Le Gac relocated with Haguenauer to Montreal, Quebec, in July 2014, and was paired with Canadian ice dancer Marie-Jade Lauriault the same month. The two decided to represent France. They are coached by Haguenauer, Patrice Lauzon, Pascal Denis, and Marie-France Dubreuil in Montreal.

Lauriault/Le Gac competed on the senior level in the 2014–15 season. They won silver at the Open d'Andorra and finished ninth at the 2014 CS Golden Spin of Zagreb before taking silver at the French Championships.

=== 2015–16 season: International junior season ===
Lauriault/Le Gac decided to compete on the junior level in 2015–16. They won two medals on the Junior Grand Prix (JGP) series — silver in Linz, Austria and gold in Logroño, Spain. Their results gave them a spot at the JGP Final in Barcelona, where they finished fifth.

In February 2016, Lauriault/Le Gac won gold at the French Junior Championships ahead of Abachkina/Thauron. In March, they represented France at the 2016 World Junior Championships in Debrecen, Hungary, and won a small bronze medal after placing third in the short dance. They finished eighth overall. Over eight days in April, they skated in ten ice shows in France.

=== 2016–17 season: Grand Prix, European and World debuts ===
Returning to the senior ranks for the pre-Olympic season, Lauriault/Le Gac placed fifth at the 2016 CS Autumn Classic International. They were then invited to make their senior Grand Prix debut, finishing sixth at both the 2016 NHK Trophy and the 2017 Internationaux de France.

After winning silver at the French championships for the second time at the senior level, Lauriault/Le Gac made their European Championship debut at the 2017 edition in Ostrava, coming twelfth. They won gold at the Cup of Nice before making their World Championship debut in Helsinki, finishing twenty-first in the rhythm dance and thereby narrowly missing the cut for the free dance. They were also invited to participate as part of Team France at the World Team Trophy, finishing sixth among dance teams while France also came sixth overall.

=== 2017–18 season: Pyeongchang Olympics ===
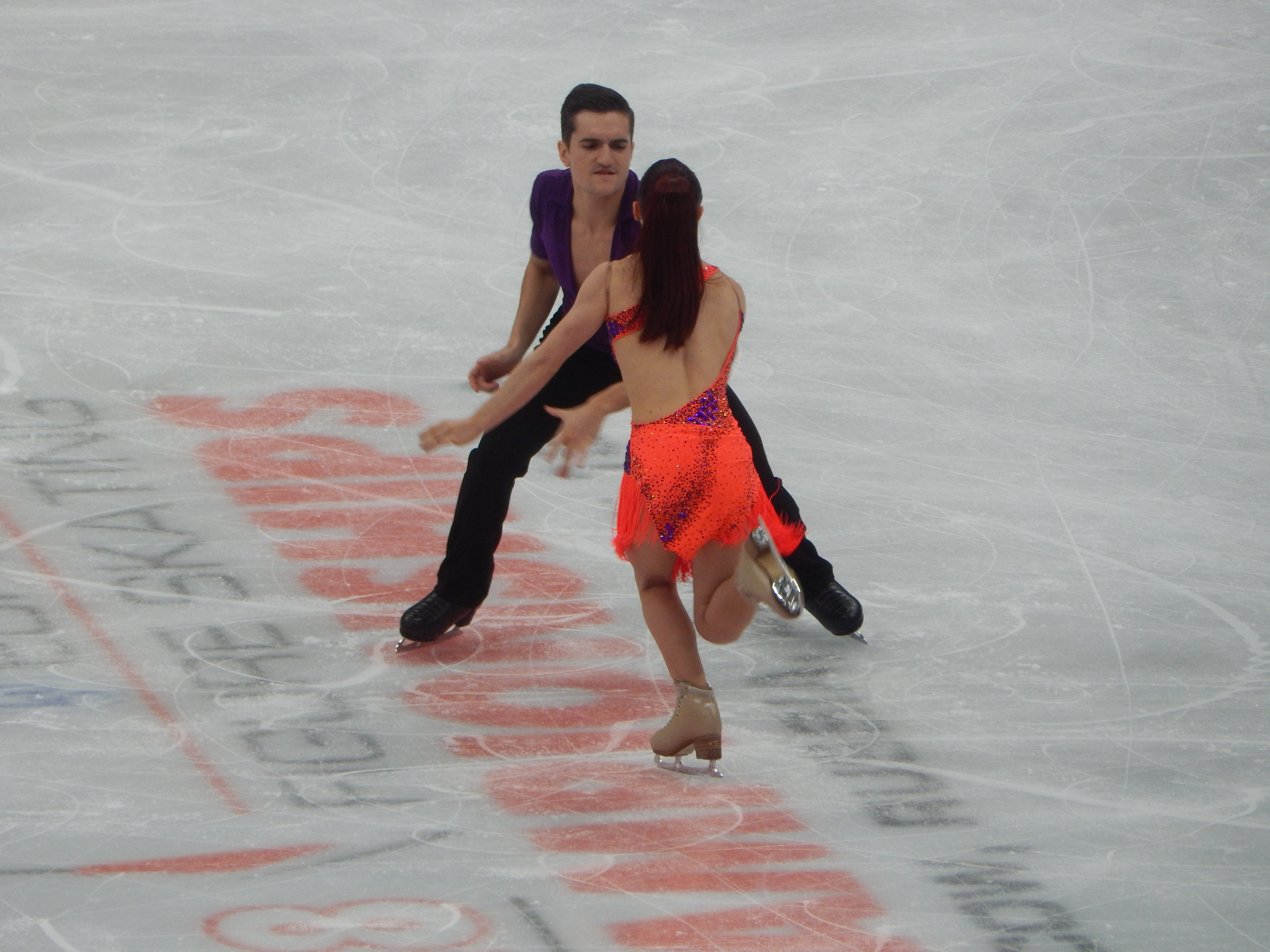
2018 European Championships

Sixth at the Autumn Classic to start the season, Lauriault/Le Gac were eighth at both the 2017 NHK Trophy and the 2017 Rostelecom Cup on the Grand Prix. They won silver at the French championships for the third time and, as a result, were named to the French team for the 2018 Winter Olympics in Pyeongchang. They finished twelfth at the 2018 European Championships shortly afterwards.

French national champions Papadakis/Cizeron declined to participate in the Olympic team event, allowing Lauriault/Le Gac to do so. They finished sixth in the rhythm dance segment, but Team France was tenth among ten teams after the first round and did not advance to the free portion of the competition. They then participated in the ice dance event, qualifying to the free dance and finishing seventeenth in their Olympic debut. Lauriault/Le Gac finished the season with a thirteenth-place finish at the post-Olympic World Championships in Milan.

=== 2018–19 season: Challenger medals ===
Lauriault/Le Gac won two medals on the Challenger series to begin the season, taking the bronze at both the 2018 CS Finlandia Trophy and the 2018 CS Inge Solar Memorial. On the Grand Prix, they finished fourth at the 2018 Skate Canada International, 6.65 points behind bronze medallists Gilles/Poirier of Canada. They were then sixth on home ice at the 2018 Internationaux de France.

French national silver medalists once again, Lauriault/Le Gac were tenth at the 2019 European Championships and fourteenth at the 2019 World Championships in Saitama.

=== 2019–20 season: Struggles ===
After a bronze medal win at the 2019 CS Autumn Classic International, Lauriault/Le Gac struggled in the early going, coming eighth at both the 2019 Skate America and the 2019 Internationaux de France. They won gold at the 2019 CS Warsaw Cup, their first Challenger title, but came fourth at the French championships and thus did not make the European Championship team. They were assigned to compete at the 2020 World Championships, to be held in Montreal near their training centre, but the event was cancelled due to the onset of the COVID-19 pandemic.

=== 2021–22 season: Switch to Canada ===
After not competing at all during the COVID-plagued 2020–21 season, Lauriault and Le Gac announced on June 6, 2021, that they would henceforth be representing her birth country of Canada. Lauriault would later say that it had been a difficult decision but that "with the pandemic, we certainly realized that we are very much at home in Canada, that our life is there. We felt that more and more as the years progressed, and Romain has established himself there as well. It is also complicated with me studying and Romain working in Canada."

After competing domestically in the fall, Lauriault/Le Gac qualified for the 2022 Canadian Championships, held without an audience in Ottawa due to the spread of the Omicron variant. They finished fifth in their first appearance at the Canadian nationals, with Lauriault saying, "it wasn't perfect, but it was what we were hoping for." Their result earned them an assignment to the 2022 Four Continents Championships in Tallinn. Competing at Four Continents, their first international event in two years, they were fifth after the rhythm dance but dropped to sixth when Lauriault fell on her twizzles in the free dance. Despite the "technical error", she insisted afterwards, "it was a great experience today; these are still good memories."

=== 2022–23 season: First Grand Prix medal ===
Beginning the season at the 2022 CS U.S. Classic, Lauriault/Le Gac finished in fourth place, 3.36 points behind American bronze medallists McNamara/Spiridonov. Given two Grand Prix assignments representing Canada for the first time, they competed first at the 2022 Skate America and won the bronze medal, their first Grand Prix medal. Le Gac said afterward that it was a significant competition for them because they had not competed on the Grand Prix since 2019, while Lauriault called it a "life-changing experience." They then appeared at the 2022 Skate Canada International the following weekend, setting new personal bests and finishing in fifth place.

Lauriault/Le Gac won the gold medal at the 2022–23 Skate Canada Challenge to qualify to the 2023 Canadian Championships. Lauriault said of the reception of their The Pink Panther program, "we've put so much work into our choreography this year, and we are pleased people are enjoying it as much as we enjoy performing it." They went on to win the bronze medal at the Canadian Championships, albeit with reigning Canadian national champions Gilles/Poirier absent due to illness.

Despite their national bronze medal, Lauriault/Le Gac were not initially assigned to any ISU championships for the second half of the season, as Gilles/Poirier were expected to return in time. However, Gilles/Poirier subsequently withdrew from the 2023 Four Continents Championships, Lauriault/Le Gac were called up to replace them.

=== 2023–24 season ===
For their free dance for the new season, Lauriault and Le Gac chose to use the soundtrack of Tim Burton's film The Corpse Bride, which she would later say they had contemplated since their junior days, but earlier felt would be too "childish". They reconsidered after a recent rewatch of the film.

In their first outing of the season, Lauriault/Le Gac won the silver medal at the 2023 CS Budapest Trophy, their first Challenger medal while representing Canada. On the Grand Prix, they finished fifth at the 2023 Grand Prix de France. They encountered difficulties in the free dance at the 2023 NHK Trophy and came seventh there. Lauriault said that it "may not have been the performance we wanted, but we are happy that we enjoyed the moment and were present and grateful for being here."

In advance of the 2024 Canadian Championships, defending silver medalists Lajoie/Lagha withdrew due to Lajoie entering concussion protocol, whilst reigning champions Fournier Beaudry/Sørensen withdrew after the latter was revealed to be under investigation for sexual assault. The ice dance podium was thus considered more open than in recent years. Lauriault/Le Gac won the silver medal. “We’re really happy with the performance today,” said Le Gac on Saturday after the free dance. “I think we really went one step at a time. It was really nice. The audience was pretty supportive today.”

With Lajoie/Lagha still unable to compete, Lauriault/Le Gac replaced them at the 2024 Four Continents Championships in Shanghai, where they were seventh in the rhythm dance after receiving a two-point deduction for an illegal move in their rotational lift. They set a new personal best score in the free dance, coming third in that segment and winning a bronze small medal, and rising to fifth overall.

=== 2024–25 season ===
Lauriault/Le Gac started their season with a gold medal win at the 2024 Lake Placid Ice Dance International. Going on to compete on the 2024–25 Grand Prix circuit, the duo finished seventh at the 2024 Skate America, dealing with errors in the free dance. Lauriault said that it was "not the free dance we were expecting to put out their today, we were just a bit off today. I think there's a lot to learn from this competition. We're going to take everything we can and leave this weekend behind." They were seventh as well at the 2024 Grand Prix de France, with Le Gac admitting "we haven’t reached our goals yet." Later in the month of November they came fifth at the 2024 CS Warsaw Cup.

At 2025 Canadian Championships, Lauriault/Le Gac entered as prospective contenders for the bronze medal. They were fourth in the rhythm dance with a score of 78.09, 0.44 points behind fellow Ice Academy of Montreal skaters Fabbri/Ayer. They were fourth in the free dance as well, by a wider margin, and finished fourth overall.

=== 2025–26 season: Milano Cortina Olympics ===
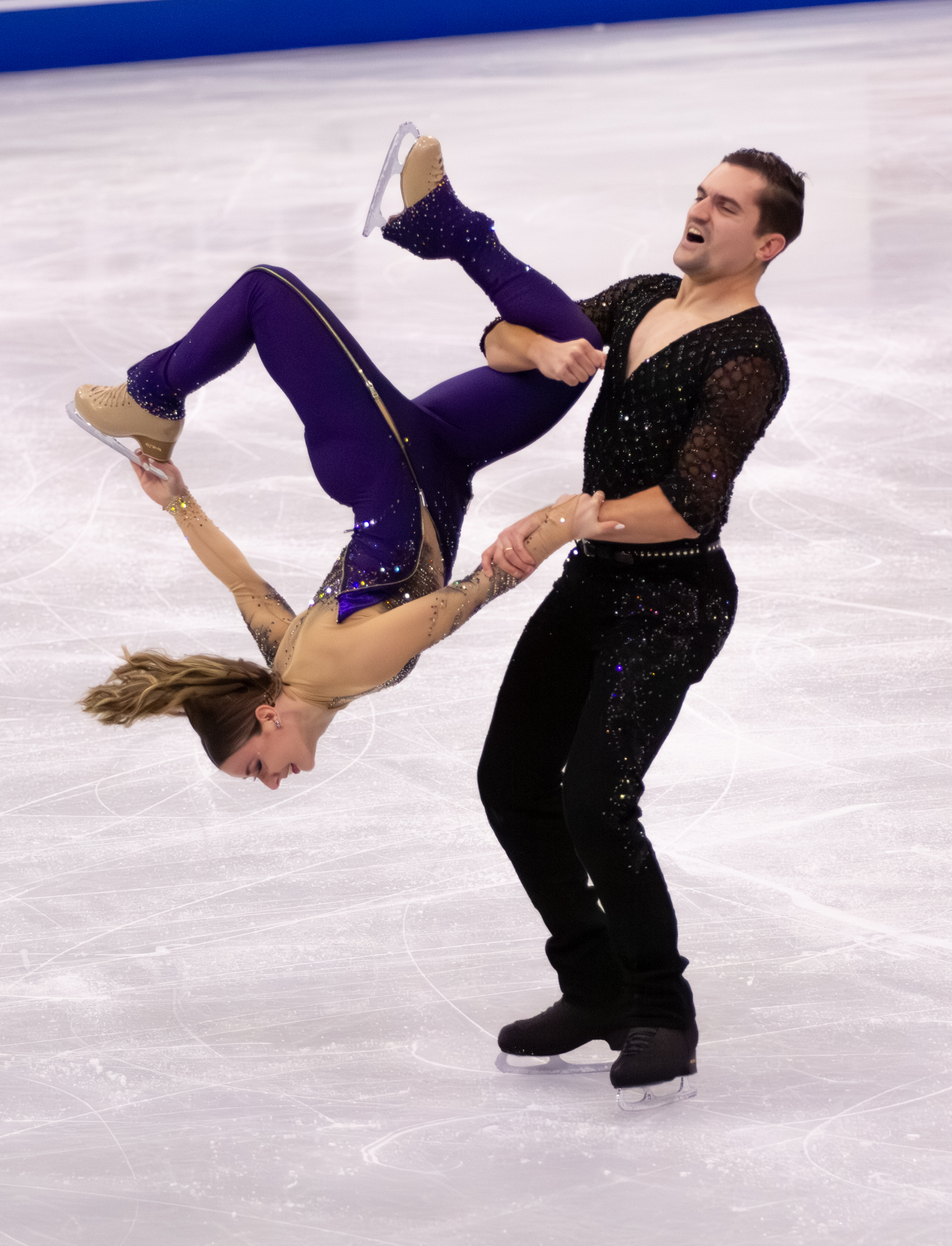
Lauriault/Le Gac performing a lift during their rhythm dance at the 2025 Skate Canada International

In August, it was announced that Lauriault/Le Gac had added Scott Moir, Madison Hubbell, and Adrián Díaz to their coaching team and would make frequent trips to London, Ontario to work with them.

The duo started the season by winning silver at the 2025 Lake Placid Ice Dance International. They then went on to compete on the 2025–26 Challenger Series, winning gold at the 2025 CS Kinoshita Group Cup and bronze at the 2025 CS Nebelhorn Trophy.

On the 2025–26 Grand Prix series, the team placed sixth at the 2025 Grand Prix de France and seventh at 2025 Skate Canada International. They followed up these results with a gold medal at the 2025 Skate Canada Challenge.

In January, Lauriault/Le Gac competed at the 2026 Canadian Championships, winning the bronze medal. "I think we're just really grateful to be able to perform like this," said Lauriault after the free dance. "It's to our training, to our coaches, the team behind us." They were subsequently named to the 2026 Winter Olympic team.

== Programs ==
=== Ice dance with Marie-Jade Lauriault ===
| Season | Short dance/Rhythm dance | Free dance | Exhibition | Ref. |
|---|---|---|---|---|
| 2014–15 | "Bamboléo"; "Habla me"; "Volare" By Gipsy Kings | Rhapsody in Blue By George Gershwin | —N/a | |
| 2015–16 | Waltz: "And the Waltz Goes On" By Anthony Hopkins; Polka: "Susie (If You Knew Susie)" Both performed by André Rieu | "While My Guitar Gently Weeps" (Love remix); "Come Together"; "Dear Prudence"; "Cry Baby Cry" (Love remix) All by The Beatles | "Unforgettable" By Nat King Cole | |
| 2016–17 | "The Way You Make Me Feel" Performed by Judith Hill; "The Way You Make Me Feel" Performed by Michael Jackson Choreo by Marie-France Dubreuil & Romain Haguenauer | "Tonight"; "Sorry Seems to Be the Hardest Word" By Elton John Choreo by Marie-France Dubreuil & Romain Haguenauer | "While My Guitar Gently Weeps"; "Come Together" All by The Beatles | |
| 2016–17 | "The Way You Make Me Feel" Performed by Judith Hill; "The Way You Make Me Feel" Performed by Michael Jackson Choreo by Marie-France Dubreuil & Romain Haguenauer | "Tonight"; "Sorry Seems to Be the Hardest Word" By Elton John Choreo by Marie-France Dubreuil & Romain Haguenauer | "Can't Take My Eyes Off You" | |
| 2017–18 | "Salsation" By David Shire; "No Hay Problema" By Pink Martini | "You Take My Breath Away"; "Another One Bites the Dust" All by Queen | "Can't Take My Eyes Off You" | |
| 2018–19 | Tango: "Cell Block Tango"; Foxtrot: "Roxie" (All from Chicago) By John Kander & Fred Ebb | "Treasure"; "Talking to the Moon"; "Uptown Funk" All by Bruno Mars | "Tu t'laisses aller"; "For Me Formidable" By Charles Aznavour | |
| 2019–20 | Waltz, Foxtrot, Quickstep, Waltz: Les Demoiselles de Rochefort by Michel Legrand | Histoire Sans Paroles; En Pleine Face; Dixie by Harmonium | —N/a | |
| 2020–21 | Tango: "Cell Block Tango"; Foxtrot: "Roxie" | | —N/a | |
| 2021–22 | "Downtown"; "Same Love"; "Can't Hold Us"All by Macklemore & Ryan Lewis Choreo. by Romain Haguenauer | "Some Nights" By fun. Choreo. by Romain Haguenauer | —N/a | |
| 2022–23 | Mambo: Malambo No. 1 By Yma Sumac; Rhumba: Ms. Harmony By Robin Thicke; Mambo: Mambo No. 8 By Dámaso Perez Prado Choreo by. Marie-France Dubreuil, Romain Haguenauer, Samuel Chouinard & Ginette Cournoyer | The Pink Panther By Christophe Beck Choreo. by Marie-France Dubreuil, Romain Haguenauer, Samuel Chouinard, Ginette Cournoyer | "Hawaiian Surf" By The Kalua Beach Boys; "Surfin' U.S.A." By The Beach Boys; "Surf Crazy Finale" By the Teen Beach Movie cast | |
| 2023–24 | "Need You Tonight"; "Never Tear Us Apart"; "Devil Inside" By INXS Choreo. by Marie-France Dubreuil, Romain Haguenauer, Samuel Chouinard & Ginette Cournoyer | Corpse Bride By Danny Elfman Choreo. by Marie-France Dubreuil, Romain Haguenauer, Samuel Chouinard & Ginette Cournoyer | The Pink Panther | |
| 2024–25 | "The Rich Man's Frug" (from Sweet Charity) By Cy Coleman & Dorothy Fields Performed by Christina Applegate; "The Rich Man's Frug" (from Fosse) Performed by the Fosse Ensemble Choreo.by Marie-France Dubreuil, Romain Haguenauer, Samuel Chouinard & Émilie Josset | "Man with a Harmonica" (from Once Upon a Time in the West) By Ennio Morricone; "Lone Rider"; "For the Love of Gold" By Stephan Sechi & the Hollywood Symphony Orchestra; "Devil Got You Beat" By Blues Saraceno Choreo. by Marie-France Dubreuil, Romain Haguenauer, Samuel Chouinard & Émilie Josset | "Country Girl (Shake It for Me)" By Luke Bryan | |
| 2025–26 | "Thunder"; "Cream" By Prince Choreo.by Scott Moir, Madison Hubbell, Adrián Díaz, Romain Haguenauer & Samuel Chouinard; "You Need Love Like I Do" featuring Heather Small, 7th District Radio Mix By Tom Jones; "Sex Bomb" featuring Mousse T.; "Sex Bomb" featuring Mousse T., Peppermint Disco Radio Edit By Tom Jones | "Les Pyramides"; "Astérix et Obélix: Mission Cléopâtre (Main Title)"; "Numérobis Théme" (from Astérix et Obélix : Mission Cléopâtre) By Philippe Chany; "Cleopatra's Song of the Nile" By Jeffrey Goodman; "Edony (Clap your Hands)" By Martin Solveig & Hossam Ramzy; "Alf Layla Wa Layla (Radio Edit)" By Back to Basics, Baligh Hamdi, Morsi Gamil Aziz, & Umm Kulthum Choreo.by Scott Moir, Madison Hubbell, Adrián Díaz, Romain Haguenauer & Samuel Chouinard | "Country Girl (Shake It for Me)" By Luke Bryan | |
| 2026-27 | "The Dancing Cat" By Henry Mancini; "Voices of Spring, Op. 410" By Johann Strauss II; "Glitz at the Ritz" By Jules Gaia; Choreo. by Scott Moir, Madison Hubbel, Adrian Diaz & Samuel Chouinard | "Horizon Ouverture"; "Prime (2012) Unfinished"; "Horizon (Japan CD)" By Daft Punk; Choreo. by Scott Moir, Madison Hubbel, Adrian Diaz & Samuel Chouinard | | |

=== With Elizabeth ===
| Season | Short dance | Free dance |
|---|---|---|
| 2013–2014 | Maddest Kind of Love; King of Swing by Big Bad Voodoo Daddy | Bamboleo; Habla Me; Volare all by Gipsy Kings |
| 2012–2013 | Madness; Uprising by Muse; Les Uns Contre Les Autres by Fabienne Thibeault; Pumpkin and Honey Bunny by Dick Dale & The Del-Tones | Je m'voyais deja; La Bohème by Charles Aznavour |
| 2011–2012 | Sway performed by The Puppini Sisters; Sway performed by The Pussycat Dolls | Stephane; Do You Know what It Means to Miss New Orleans; Minor Swing by Claude Bolling, Stephane Grappelli |

== Competitive highlights ==
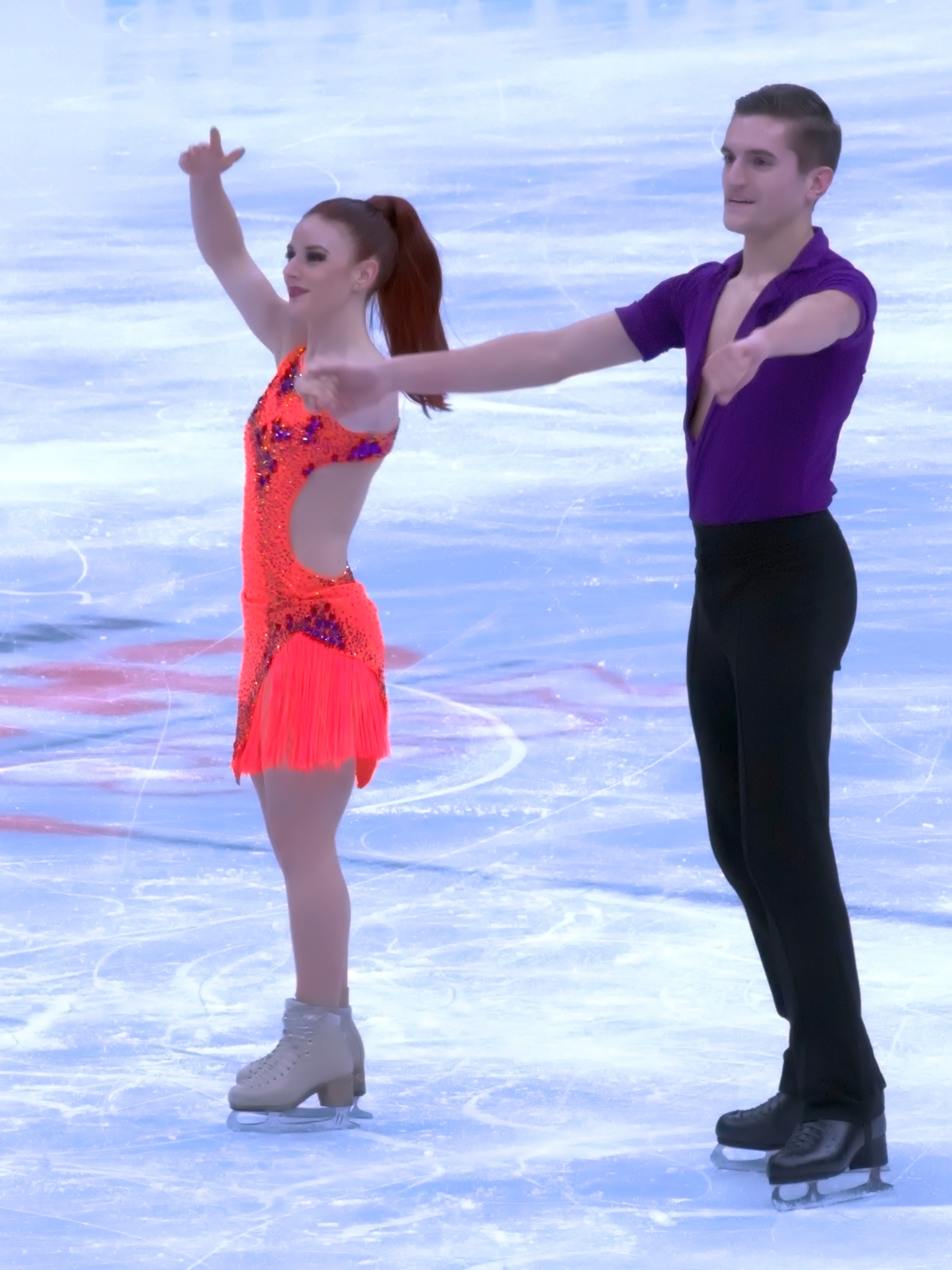
Lauriault and Le Gac at the 2018 European Championships

- GP – Event of the ISU Grand Prix Series
- JGP – Event of the ISU Junior Grand Prix Series
- CS – Event of the ISU Challenger Series
- C – Event was cancelled
- TBD – Assigned
- WD – Withdrew from competition

=== Ice dance with Marie-Jade Lauriault (for Canada) ===
Competition placements at senior level
| Season | 2021–22 | 2022–23 | 2023–24 | 2024–25 | 2025–26 | 2026-27 |
|---|---|---|---|---|---|---|
| Winter Olympics | | | | | 14th | |
| World Championships | | | | | 13th | |
| Four Continents Championships | 6th | 6th | 5th | | | |
| Canadian Championships | 5th | 3rd | 2nd | 4th | 3rd | |
| GP Finland | | | | | | TBD |
| GP France | | | 5th | 7th | 6th | |
| GP NHK Trophy | | | 7th | | | |
| GP Skate America | | 3rd | | 7th | | |
| GP Skate Canada | | 5th | | | 7th | 5th |
| CS Budapest Trophy | | | 2nd | | | |
| CS Kinoshita Group Cup | | | | | 1st | |
| CS Nebelhorn Trophy | | | | | 3rd | 2nd |
| CS U.S. Classic | | 4th | | | | |
| CS Warsaw Cup | | | | 5th | | |
| Lake Placid Ice Dance | | | | 1st | 2nd | |
| Skate Canada Challenge | 3rd | 1st | | | 1st | |

=== Ice dance with Marie-Jade Lauriault (for France) ===
Competition placements at senior level
| Season | 2014–15 | 2016–17 | 2017–18 | 2018–19 | 2019–20 |
|---|---|---|---|---|---|
| Winter Olympics | | | 17th | | |
| Winter Olympics (Team event) | | | 10th | | |
| World Championships | | 21st | 13th | 14th | C |
| European Championships | | 12th | 12th | 10th | |
| French Championships | 2nd | 2nd | 2nd | 2nd | 4th |
| World Team Trophy | | 6th (6th) | | | |
| GP France | | 6th | | 6th | 8th |
| GP NHK Trophy | | 6th | 8th | | |
| GP Rostelecom Cup | | | 8th | | |
| GP Skate America | | | | | 8th |
| GP Skate Canada | | | | 4th | |
| CS Alpen Trophy | | | | 3rd | |
| CS Autumn Classic | | 5th | 6th | | 3rd |
| CS Finlandia Trophy | | | | 3rd | |
| CS Golden Spin of Zagreb | 9th | | | | |
| CS Warsaw Cup | | | | | 1st |
| Bavarian Open | | | | | 2nd |
| Cup of Nice | | 1st | 3rd | | |
| Master's de Patinage | 2nd | 2nd | 2nd | 1st | 2nd |
| Open d'Andorra | 2nd | | | | |
| Shanghai Trophy | | | 3rd | | |

Competition placements at junior level
| Season | 2015–16 |
|---|---|
| World Junior Championships | 8th |
| Junior Grand Prix Final | 5th |
| French Championships | 1st |
| JGP Austria | 2nd |
| JGP Spain | 1st |
| Master's de Patinage | 1st |

=== Ice dance with Estelle Elizabeth (for France) ===
Competition placements at junior level
| Season | 2010–11 | 2011–12 | 2012–13 | 2013–14 |
|---|---|---|---|---|
| Winter Youth Olympics | | 5th | | |
| Winter Youth Olympics (Team event) | | 3rd | | |
| World Junior Championships | | | 15th | 11th |
| French Championships | | 1st | 2nd | 1st |
| JGP Austria | | 9th | | |
| JGP Belarus | | | | 7th |
| JGP France | | | 10th | |
| JGP Italy | | 8th | | |
| JGP Latvia | | | | 5th |
| JGP Turkey | | | 10th | |
| Ice Challenge | | | | 2nd |
| Master's de Patinage | 2nd | 3rd | 2nd | 1st |
| Pavel Roman Memorial | | 12th | | |
| Santa Claus Cup | | 5th | | |
| Trophy of Lyon | 9th | 3rd | 2nd | |

== Detailed results ==
=== Ice dance with Marie-Jade Lauriault ===
ISU personal best scores in the +5/-5 GOE System
| Segment | Type | Score | Event |
|---|---|---|---|
| Total | TSS | 197.90 | 2025 CS Kinoshita Group Cup |
| Rhythm dance | TSS | 76.40 | 2025 CS Kinoshita Group Cup |
| Rhythm dance | TES | 43.94 | 2025 CS Kinoshita Group Cup |
| Rhythm dance | PCS | 33.64 | 2024 Skate America |
| Free dance | TSS | 121.50 | 2025 CS Kinoshita Group Cup |
| Free dance | TES | 69.10 | 2025 CS Kinoshita Group Cup |
| Free dance | PCS | 52.40 | 2025 CS Kinoshita Group Cup |

Results in the 2021–22 season
| Date | Event | RD | | FD | | Total | |
| Date | Event | P | Score | P | Score | P | Score |
|---|---|---|---|---|---|---|---|
| Dec 1–5, 2021 | 2021 Skate Canada Challenge | 5 | 60.70 | 1 | 112.96 | 3 | 173.66 |
| Jan 6–12, 2022 | (Canada) 2022 Canadian Championships | 5 | 71.29 | 4 | 110.45 | 5 | 181.74 |
| Jan 18–23, 2022 | (Estonia) 2022 Four Continents Championships | 5 | 68.66 | 6 | 98.23 | 6 | 166.89 |

Results in the 2022–23 season
| Date | Event | RD | | FD | | Total | |
| Date | Event | P | Score | P | Score | P | Score |
|---|---|---|---|---|---|---|---|
| Sep 12–16, 2022 | (United States) 2022 CS U.S. International Classic | 4 | 68.72 | 3 | 106.95 | 4 | 175.67 |
| Oct 21–23, 2022 | (United States) 2022 Skate America | 3 | 72.12 | 3 | 106.18 | 3 | 178.30 |
| Oct 28–30, 2022 | 2022 Skate Canada International | 5 | 74.59 | 5 | 114.48 | 5 | 189.07 |
| Nov 30 – Dec 3, 2022 | 2022 Skate Canada Challenge | 1 | 78.92 | 1 | 117.83 | 1 | 196.75 |
| Jan 9–15, 2023 | (Canada) 2023 Canadian Championships | 3 | 77.34 | 3 | 119.06 | 3 | 196.40 |
| Feb 7–12, 2023 | (United States) 2023 Four Continents Championships | 8 | 62.03 | 6 | 109.32 | 6 | 171.35 |

Results in the 2023–24 season
| Date | Event | RD | | FD | | Total | |
| Date | Event | P | Score | P | Score | P | Score |
|---|---|---|---|---|---|---|---|
| Oct 13-15, 2023 | (Hungary) 2023 CS Budapest Trophy | 2 | 71.92 | 2 | 116.40 | 2 | 188.32 |
| Nov 3–5, 2023 | 2023 Grand Prix de France | 5 | 70.48 | 5 | 112.13 | 5 | 182.61 |
| Nov 24–26, 2023 | (Japan) 2023 NHK Trophy | 7 | 71.35 | 7 | 104.91 | 7 | 176.26 |
| Jan 8–14, 2024 | (Canada) 2024 Canadian Championships | 2 | 78.00 | 2 | 122.50 | 2 | 200.50 |
| Jan 30 – Feb 4, 2024 | (China) 2024 Four Continents Championships | 7 | 71.26 | 3 | 119.57 | 5 | 190.83 |

Results in the 2024–25 season
| Date | Event | RD | | FD | | Total | |
| Date | Event | P | Score | P | Score | P | Score |
|---|---|---|---|---|---|---|---|
| Jul 30–31, 2024 | (United States) 2024 Lake Placid Ice Dance International | 1 | 77.28 | 1 | 113.91 | 1 | 191.19 |
| Oct 18–20, 2024 | (United States) 2024 Skate America | 6 | 70.38 | 7 | 104.53 | 7 | 174.91 |
| Oct 31 – Nov 3, 2024 | 2024 Grand Prix de France | 5 | 72.54 | 8 | 103.31 | 7 | 175.85 |
| Jan 14–19, 2025 | (Canada) 2025 Canadian Championships | 4 | 78.09 | 4 | 115.19 | 4 | 193.28 |

Results in the 2025–26 season
| Date | Event | RD | | FD | | Total | |
| Date | Event | P | Score | P | Score | P | Score |
|---|---|---|---|---|---|---|---|
| July 29–31, 2025 | (United States) 2025 Lake Placid Ice Dance International | 2 | 72.50 | 1 | 114.58 | 2 | 187.08 |
| Sep 5–7, 2025 | (Japan) 2025 CS Kinoshita Group Cup | 1 | 76.40 | 1 | 121.50 | 1 | 197.90 |
| Sept 25–27, 2025 | (Germany) 2025 CS Nebelhorn Trophy | 4 | 68.98 | 3 | 111.19 | 3 | 180.17 |
| Oct 17–19, 2025 | 2025 Grand Prix de France | 6 | 73.75 | 6 | 112.74 | 6 | 186.49 |
| Oct 31 – Nov 2, 2025 | 2025 Skate Canada International | 7 | 70.84 | 6 | 108.57 | 7 | 179.41 |
| Nov 27–29, 2025 | 2025 Skate Canada Challenge | 1 | 75.81 | 1 | 119.84 | 1 | 195.65 |
| Jan 5–11, 2026 | (Canada) 2026 Canadian Championships | 3 | 78.64 | 3 | 122.29 | 3 | 200.93 |
| Feb 9-11, 2026 | (Italy) 2026 Winter Olympics | 15 | 74.35 | 14 | 112.83 | 14 | 187.18 |
| Mar 24–29, 2026 | (Czech Republic) 2026 World Championships | 20 | 69.70 | 13 | 111.96 | 13 | 181.66 |

Results in the 2026–27 season
| Date | Event | RD | | FD | | Total | |
| Date | Event | P | Score | P | Score | P | Score |
|---|---|---|---|---|---|---|---|
| Sep 24–26, 2026 | (Germany) 2026 CS Nebelhorn Trophy | 2 | 75.57 | 4 | 107.83 | 2 | 183.40 |
| Oct 30 - Nov 1, 2026 | 2026 Skate Canada International | 5 | 72.10 | 5 | 107.70 | 5 | 179.80 |
