= 2025 Grand Prix de France =

International figure skating competition

- Type: Grand Prix
- Date: 17 – 19 October 2025
- Season: 2025–26
- Location: Angers, France
- Host: French Federation of Ice Sports
- Venue: Angers IceParc

Champions
- Men's singles: (United States) Ilia Malinin
- Women's singles: (Japan) Ami Nakai
- Pairs: (Japan) Riku Miura and Ryuichi Kihara
- Ice dance: (France) Laurence Fournier Beaudry and Guillaume Cizeron
- Previous: 2024 Grand Prix de France
- Next: 2026 Grand Prix de France
- Next Grand Prix: 2025 Cup of China

The 2025 Grand Prix de France is a figure skating competition sanctioned by the International Skating Union (ISU). Organized and hosted by the French Federation of Ice Sports (French: Fédération française des sports de glace), it was the first event of the 2025–26 Grand Prix of Figure Skating: a senior-level international invitational competition series. It was held from 17 to 19 October 2025 at the Angers IceParc in Angers. Medals were awarded in men's singles, women's singles, pair skating, and ice dance. Skaters earned points based on their results, and the top skaters or teams in each discipline at the end of the season were then invited to compete at the 2025–26 Grand Prix Final in Nagoya, Japan. Ilia Malinin of the United States won the men's event, Ami Nakai of Japan won the women's event, Riku Miura and Ryuichi Kihara of Japan won the pairs event, and Laurence Fournier Beaudry and Guillaume Cizeron of France won the ice dance event.

== Background ==
The ISU Grand Prix of Figure Skating is a series of seven events sanctioned by the International Skating Union (ISU) and held during the autumn: six qualifying events and the Grand Prix of Figure Skating Final. This allows skaters to perfect their programs earlier in the season, as well as compete against the same skaters whom they would later encounter at the World Championships. Skaters earn points based on their results at the six qualifying events, after which the top skaters or teams in each discipline are invited to compete at the Grand Prix Final. The Grand Prix de France debuted in 1987, and when the ISU launched the Grand Prix series in 1995, the Grand Prix de France was one of the original qualifying events. It has been a Grand Prix event every year since, except for 2020, when it was cancelled due to the COVID-19 pandemic. The 2025 Grand Prix de France was the first event of the 2025–26 Grand Prix of Figure Skating series, and was held from 17 to 19 October 2025 at the Angers IceParc in Angers.

== Changes to preliminary assignments ==
The International Skating Union published the initial list of entrants on 6 June 2025.

| Discipline | Withdrew | | Added | | Notes | Ref. |
| Discipline | Date | Skater(s) | Date | Skater(s) | Notes | Ref. |
|---|---|---|---|---|---|---|
| Men | —N/a | | 30 July | (France); François Pitot | Host picks | |
| Women | —N/a | | 30 July | (France); Léa Serna | Host picks | |
| Pairs | —N/a | | 30 July | (France); Camille Kovalev; Pavel Kovalev | Host picks | |
| Women | —N/a | | 2 September | (France); Clémence Mayindu | Host picks | |
| Pairs | —N/a | | 2 September | (France); Megan Wessenberg; Denys Strekalin | Host picks | |
| Ice dance | —N/a | | 2 September | (France); Célina Fradji; Jean-Hans Fourneaux | Host picks | |
| Ice dance | —N/a | | 2 September | (France); Natacha Lagouge; Arnaud Caffa | Host picks | |
| Pairs | 29 September | (Australia); Anastasia Golubeva; Hektor Giotopoulos Moore | 29 September | (United States); Katie McBeath; Daniil Parkman | —N/a | |
| Women | 7 October | (Estonia); Niina Petrõkina | 9 October | (South Korea); Shin Ji-a | Medical reasons (Petrõkina) | |

== Required performance elements ==
=== Single skating ===
Women competing in single skating performed their short programs on 17 October, while men performed theirs on 18 October. Lasting 2 minutes 40 seconds (+/− 10 seconds), the short program had to include the following elements:

For men: one double or triple Axel; one triple or quadruple jump; one jump combination consisting of a double jump and a triple jump, two triple jumps, or a quadruple jump and a double jump or triple jump; one flying spin; one camel spin or sit spin with a change of foot; one spin combination with a change of foot; and a step sequence using the full ice surface.

For women: one double or triple Axel; one triple jump; one jump combination consisting of a double jump and a triple jump, or two triple jumps; one flying spin; one layback spin, sideways leaning spin, camel spin, or sit spin without a change of foot; one spin combination with a change of foot; and one step sequence using the full ice surface.

Women performed their free skates on 18 October, while men performed theirs on 19 October. Lasting 4 minutes (+/− 10 seconds), the free skate for both men and women had to include the following: seven jump elements, of which one had to be an Axel-type jump; three spins, of which one had to be a spin combination, one a flying spin, and one a spin with only one position; a step sequence; and a choreographic sequence.

=== Pairs ===
Couples competing in pair skating performed their short programs on 17 October. Lasting 2 minutes 40 seconds (+/− 10 seconds), the short program had to include the following elements: one pair lift, one double or triple twist lift, one double or triple throw jump, one double or triple solo jump, one solo spin combination with a change of foot, one death spiral, and a step sequence using the full ice surface.

Couples performed their free skates on 18 October. Lasting 4 minutes (+/− 10 seconds), the free skate had to include the following: three pair lifts, of which one had to be a twist lift; two different throw jumps; one solo jump; one jump combination or sequence; one pair spin combination; one death spiral; and a choreographic sequence.

=== Ice dance ===
Couples competing in ice dance performed their rhythm dances on 18 October. Lasting 2 minutes 50 seconds (+/− 10 seconds), the theme of the rhythm dance this season was "music, dance styles, and feeling of the 1990s". Examples of applicable dance styles and music included pop, Latin, house, techno, hip-hop, and grunge. The rhythm dance had to include the following elements: one pattern dance step sequence, one choreographic rhythm sequence, one dance lift, one set of sequential twizzles, and one step sequence.

Couples then performed their free dances on 19 October. Lasting 4 minutes (+/− 10 seconds), the free dance had to include the following: three dance lifts or one short lift and one combination lift; one dance spin; one set of synchronized twizzles; one step sequence in hold; one step sequence while on one skate and not in hold, and three choreographic elements.

== Judging ==
Skaters were judged according to the required technical elements of their program (such as jumps and spins), as well as the overall presentation of their program, based on three program components (skating skills, presentation, and composition). Each technical element in a figure skating performance was assigned a predetermined base point value and scored by a panel of nine judges on a scale from −5 to +5 based on the quality of its execution. Each Grade of Execution (GOE) from –5 to +5 was assigned a value as indicated on the Scale of Values. For example, a triple Axel was worth a base value of 8.00 points, and a GOE of +3 was worth 2.40 points, so a triple Axel with a GOE of +3 earned 10.40 points. The judging panel's GOE for each element was determined by calculating the trimmed mean (the average after discarding the highest and lowest scores). The panel's scores for all elements were added together to generate a Total Elements Score. At the same time, the judges evaluated each performance based on the five aforementioned program components and assigned each a score from 0.25 to 10 in 0.25-point increments. The judging panel's final score for each program component was also determined by calculating the trimmed mean. Those scores were then multiplied by the factor shown on the chart below; the results were added together to generate a total Program Component Score.

Program component factoring
| Discipline | Short program or rhythm dance | Free skate or free dance |
|---|---|---|
| Men | 1.67 | 3.33 |
| Women | 1.33 | 2.67 |
| Pairs | 1.33 | 2.67 |
| Ice dance | 1.33 | 2.00 |

Deductions were applied for certain violations, such as time infractions, stops and restarts, or falls. The Total Elements Score and Program Component Score were then added together, minus any deductions, to generate a final performance score for each skater or team.

== Medal summary ==
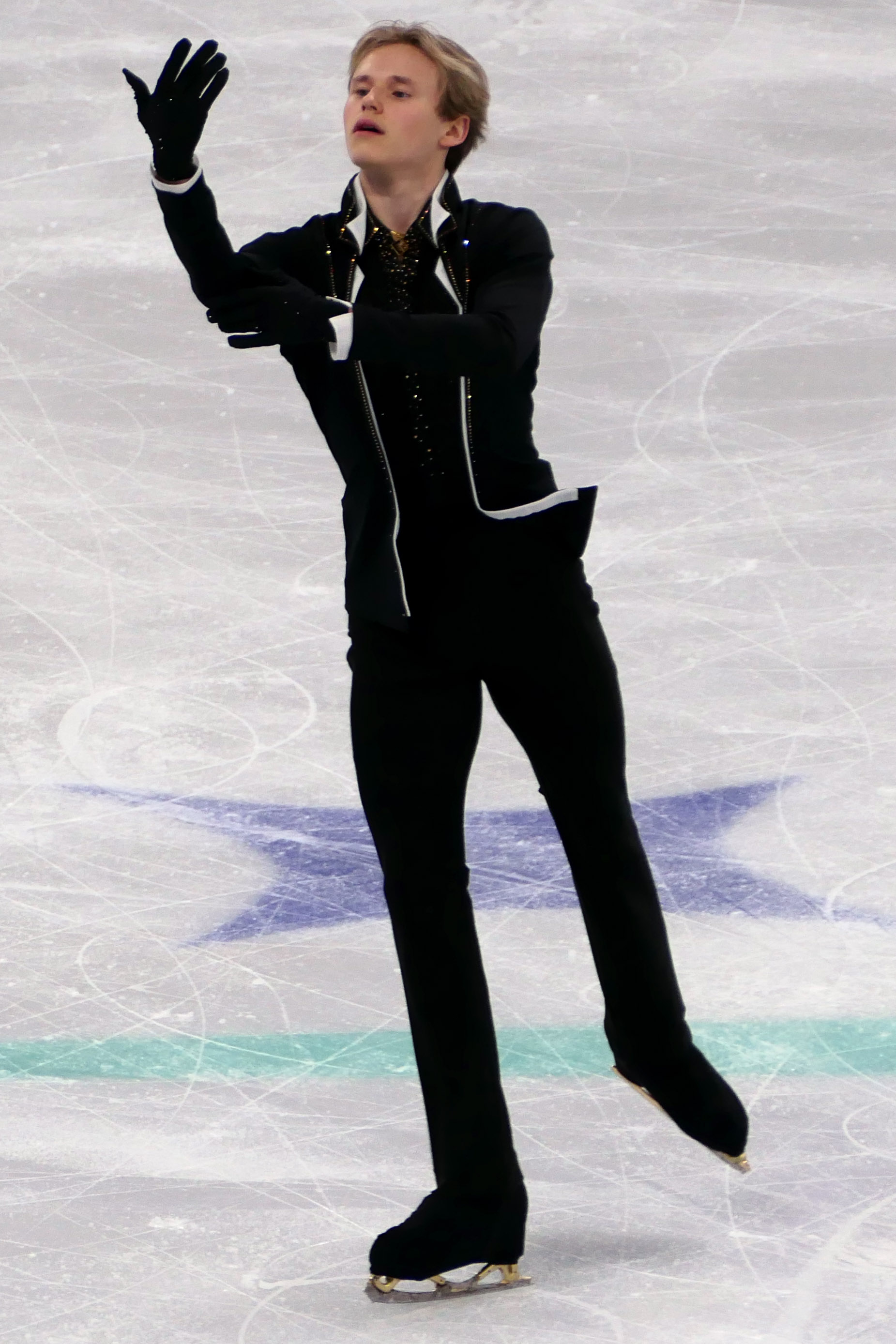
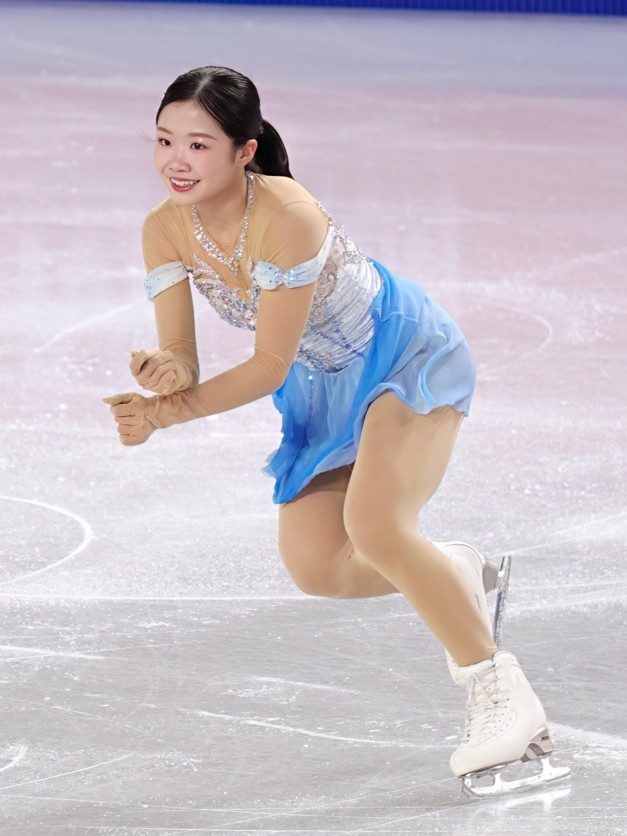
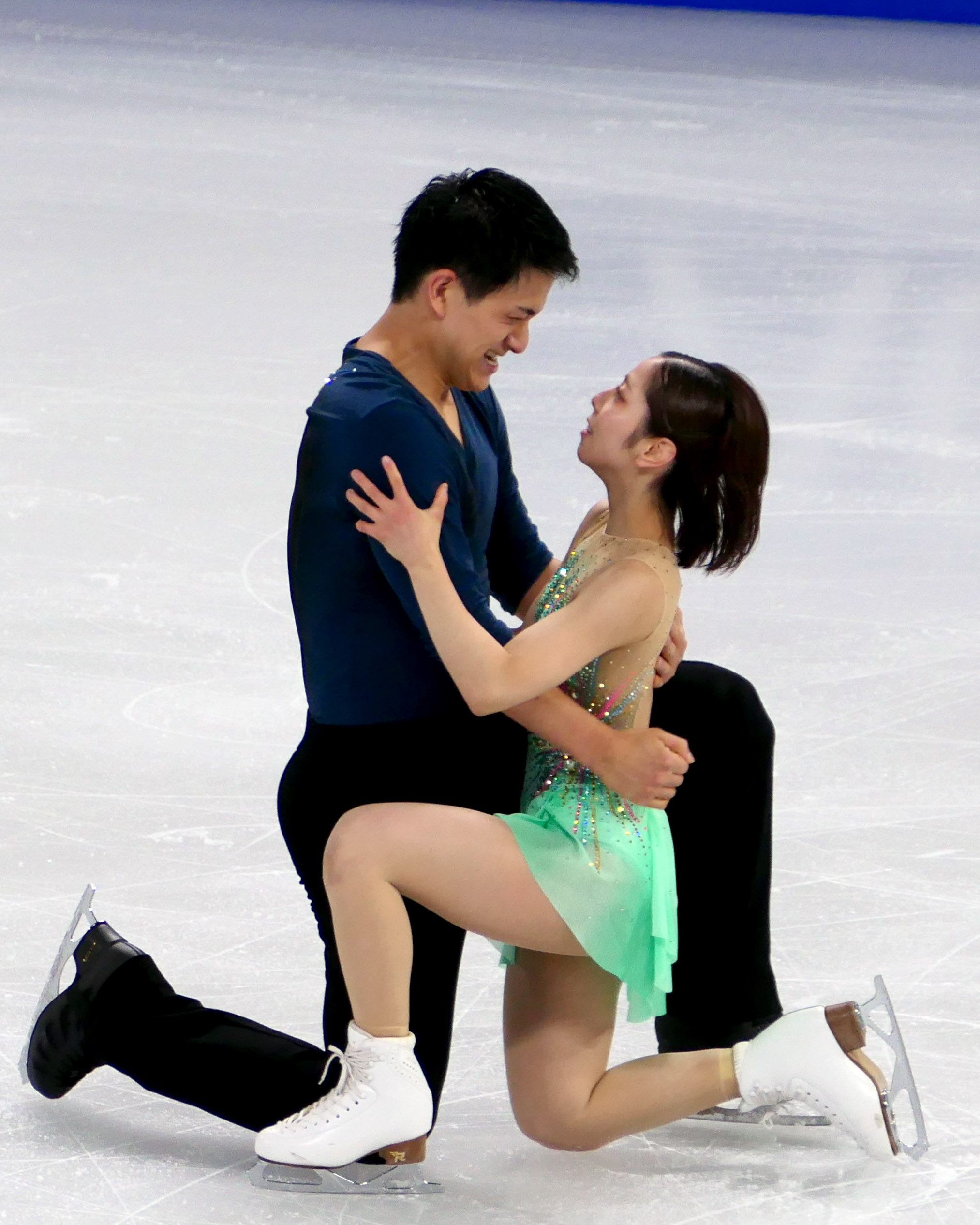
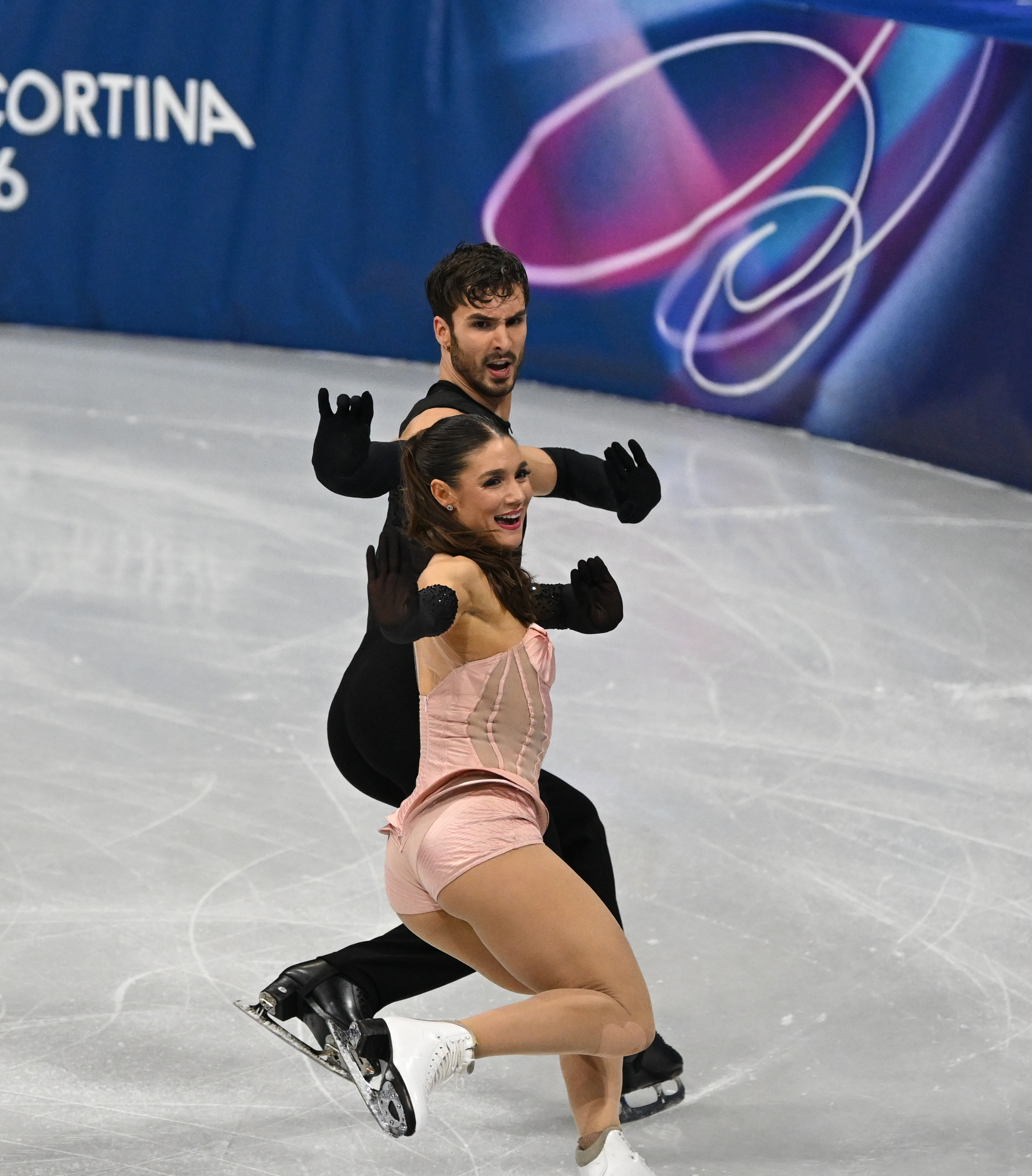
The 2025 Grand Prix de France champions: Ilia Malinin of the United States (men's singles); Ami Nakai of Japan (women's singles); Riku Miura and Ryuichi Kihara of Japan (pair skating); and Laurence Fournier Beaudry and Guillaume Cizeron of France (ice dance)

Medalists
| Discipline | Gold | Silver | Bronze |
|---|---|---|---|
| Men | (United States) Ilia Malinin | (France) Adam Siao Him Fa | (Georgia (country)) Nika Egadze |
| Women | (Japan) Ami Nakai | (Japan) Kaori Sakamoto | (Japan) Rion Sumiyoshi |
| Pairs | (Japan); Riku Miura; Ryuichi Kihara | (Canada); Deanna Stellato-Dudek; Maxime Deschamps | (Hungary); Maria Pavlova; Alexei Sviatchenko |
| Ice dance | (France); Laurence Fournier Beaudry; Guillaume Cizeron | (United Kingdom); Lilah Fear; Lewis Gibson | (Lithuania); Allison Reed; Saulius Ambrulevičius |

== Results ==
=== Men's singles ===
Ilia Malinin of the United States won the men's event overwhelmingly, defeating second-place finisher Adam Siao Him Fa of France by a margin of over forty points. The last time that Malinin had been defeated in competition was by Siao Him Fa at the 2023 Grand Prix de France; he had not lost a competition since. Malinin secured a comfortable lead after his short program, which included a quadruple Lutz-triple toe loop jump combination and his signature backflip. Malinin's free skate featured a quadruple flip, triple Axel, and quadruple Lutz, among other elements. Nika Egadze of Georgia won the bronze medal; it was Egadze's first Grand Prix medal.

Men's results
| Rank | Skater | Nation | Total points | SP | | FS | |
|---|---|---|---|---|---|---|---|
| 1st place, gold medalist(s) | Ilia Malinin | United States | 321.00 | 1 | 105.22 | 1 | 215.78 |
| 2nd place, silver medalist(s) | Adam Siao Him Fa | France | 280.95 | 5 | 84.87 | 2 | 196.08 |
| 3rd place, bronze medalist(s) | Nika Egadze | Georgia | 259.41 | 2 | 95.67 | 4 | 163.74 |
| 4 | Lukas Britschgi | Switzerland | 249.04 | 7 | 78.68 | 3 | 170.36 |
| 5 | François Pitot | France | 233.98 | 8 | 78.50 | 6 | 155.48 |
| 6 | Andrew Torgashev | United States | 233.36 | 12 | 71.52 | 5 | 161.84 |
| 7 | Tatsuya Tsuboi | Japan | 232.78 | 4 | 87.04 | 9 | 145.74 |
| 8 | Mihhail Selevko | Estonia | 232.17 | 6 | 80.17 | 7 | 152.00 |
| 9 | Maxim Naumov | United States | 226.74 | 9 | 75.27 | 8 | 151.47 |
| 10 | Kao Miura | Japan | 209.57 | 3 | 87.25 | 12 | 122.32 |
| 11 | Luc Economides | France | 208.86 | 10 | 75.20 | 10 | 133.66 |
| 12 | Gabriele Frangipani | Italy | 197.99 | 11 | 71.81 | 11 | 126.18 |

=== Women's singles ===
It was a Japanese sweep of the women's podium at the Grand Prix de France. Ami Nakai, in her first season on the senior skating circuit, won the women's event, defeating her teammate and skating idol Kaori Sakamoto. "I came here aiming for a podium, so when I saw the score and realized I was first, my brain froze and stopped working and then the tears came flowing," Nakai explained afterward. Sakamoto finished in second place; it was her first defeat at a Grand Prix event in two seasons. "I am not going to leave it at this, and I plan to get better and better throughout the season," Sakamoto stated afterward. Rion Sumiyoshi won the bronze medal.

Women's results
| Rank | Skater | Nation | Total points | SP | | FS | |
|---|---|---|---|---|---|---|---|
| 1st place, gold medalist(s) | Ami Nakai | Japan | 227.08 | 1 | 78.00 | 1 | 149.08 |
| 2nd place, silver medalist(s) | Kaori Sakamoto | Japan | 224.23 | 2 | 76.20 | 2 | 148.03 |
| 3rd place, bronze medalist(s) | Rion Sumiyoshi | Japan | 216.06 | 4 | 71.03 | 3 | 145.03 |
| 4 | Isabeau Levito | United States | 212.71 | 3 | 73.37 | 4 | 139.34 |
| 5 | Lorine Schild | France | 189.31 | 5 | 62.45 | 5 | 126.86 |
| 6 | Kim Chae-yeon | South Korea | 187.59 | 6 | 62.24 | 6 | 125.35 |
| 7 | Shin Ji-a | South Korea | 182.33 | 8 | 59.23 | 7 | 123.10 |
| 8 | Elyce Lin-Gracey | United States | 172.07 | 7 | 59.30 | 9 | 112.77 |
| 9 | You Young | South Korea | 171.82 | 10 | 54.40 | 8 | 117.42 |
| 10 | Léa Serna | France | 164.79 | 9 | 57.06 | 10 | 107.73 |
| 11 | Clémence Mayindu | France | 136.91 | 11 | 48.05 | 12 | 88.86 |
| 12 | Livia Kaiser | Switzerland | 134.83 | 12 | 42.30 | 11 | 92.53 |

=== Pairs ===
Riku Miura and Ryuichi Kihara of Japan won the pairs event by a margin of over twenty points. "In the last competition [the 2025 Kinoshita Group Cup] … we had two mistakes, so we tried coming into this event to completely erase those mistakes. Today, we were able to land those two elements cleanly, so we are very happy about that," Miura stated afterward. Deanna Stellato-Dudek and Maxime Deschamps of Canada finished in second place, while Maria Pavlova and Alexei Sviatchenko of Hungary finished third.

Stellato-Dudek and Deschamps performed an assisted backflip during their short program. Stellato-Dudek performed the actual backflip with an assist from Deschamps, who pulled up one of her skates. Stellato-Dudek, who cited Surya Bonaly of France as an inspiration, became the first woman to perform the backflip since it became a legal element in figure skating in 2024. Bonaly had performed a backflip at the 1998 Winter Olympics when it was an illegal maneuver, for which she received a point deduction. An error on the opening twist lift in their free skate – Stellato-Dudek clipped Deschamps' boot with her toepick – disrupted their momentum, leading to a series of small errors on their next few elements. Deschamps explained afterward: "For every athlete, missing the first element ... it’s always hard. The first one usually is the element that gives you the mood for a program, gives you the rhythm and everything, and to not have it is more difficult."

Pairs' results
| Rank | Team | Nation | Total points | SP | | FS | |
|---|---|---|---|---|---|---|---|
| 1st place, gold medalist(s) | Riku Miura; Ryuichi Kihara | Japan | 219.15 | 1 | 79.44 | 1 | 139.71 |
| 2nd place, silver medalist(s) | Deanna Stellato-Dudek; Maxime Deschamps | Canada | 197.66 | 2 | 74.26 | 2 | 123.40 |
| 3rd place, bronze medalist(s) | Maria Pavlova; Alexei Sviatchenko | Hungary | 192.76 | 3 | 70.15 | 3 | 122.61 |
| 4 | Katie McBeath; Daniil Parkman | United States | 178.08 | 4 | 63.31 | 4 | 114.77 |
| 5 | Audrey Shin; Balázs Nagy | United States | 173.30 | 5 | 61.79 | 5 | 111.51 |
| 6 | Camille Kovalev; Pavel Kovalev | France | 160.62 | 6 | 59.00 | 6 | 101.62 |
| 7 | Aurélie Faula; Théo Belle | France | 148.10 | 7 | 54.09 | 7 | 94.01 |
| 8 | Megan Wessenberg; Denys Strekalin | France | 139.21 | 8 | 50.41 | 8 | 88.80 |

=== Ice dance ===
Laurence Fournier Beaudry and Guillaume Cizeron of France, who had been in third place after the rhythm dance, rallied back in the free dance to win the event. Their 133.02 score in the free dance was also the fourth highest score ever in the free dance. "We're really happy with the performance and the feeling that we had today," Cizeron stated afterward. "It's the kind of performance that we train and live for... It felt amazing remembering how much we love competing and doing this first competition together." Cizeron had competed for years with Gabriella Papadakis, winning five World Championship titles and gold at the 2022 Winter Olympics before they ended their partnership in December 2024. Cizeron had also previously won six Grand Prix de France titles with Papadakis. Fournier Beaudry had competed for Canada with Nikolaj Sørensen before Sørensen received a six-year suspension from competitive skating in October 2024. Fournier Beaudry and Cizeron announced their new partnership in March 2025 with a stated goal of competing at the 2026 Winter Olympics.

Lilah Fear and Lewis Gibson of Great Britain had been in the lead after the rhythm dance, but finished in second place. "Having that added layer of a crowd that is so supportive and wants to be entertained," Fear stated afterward. "It’s just such a joy and something that we love more than anything in the world, so we’re really holding on to that feeling and also definitely fired up for the next Grand Prix.” Allison Reed and Saulius Ambrulevičius of Lithuania finished in third place.

Ice dance results
| Rank | Skater | Nation | Total points | RD | | FD | |
|---|---|---|---|---|---|---|---|
| 1st place, gold medalist(s) | Laurence Fournier Beaudry; Guillaume Cizeron | France | 211.02 | 3 | 78.00 | 1 | 133.02 |
| 2nd place, silver medalist(s) | Lilah Fear; Lewis Gibson | Great Britain | 210.24 | 1 | 84.38 | 2 | 125.86 |
| 3rd place, bronze medalist(s) | Allison Reed; Saulius Ambrulevičius | Lithuania | 201.05 | 2 | 80.98 | 3 | 120.07 |
| 4 | Charlène Guignard; Marco Fabbri | Italy | 195.98 | 5 | 77.25 | 4 | 118.73 |
| 5 | Diana Davis; Gleb Smolkin | Georgia | 194.27 | 4 | 77.80 | 5 | 116.47 |
| 6 | Marie-Jade Lauriault; Romain Le Gac | Canada | 186.49 | 6 | 73.75 | 6 | 112.74 |
| 7 | Eva Pate; Logan Bye | United States | 178.68 | 7 | 71.32 | 8 | 107.36 |
| 8 | Emily Bratti; Ian Somerville | United States | 172.80 | 9 | 65.09 | 7 | 107.71 |
| 9 | Natacha Lagouge; Arnaud Caffa | France | 171.80 | 8 | 68.08 | 9 | 103.21 |
| 10 | Célina Fradji; Jean-Hans Fourneaux | France | 148.92 | 10 | 56.92 | 10 | 92.00 |

== Works cited ==
- "Special Regulations & Technical Rules – Single & Pair Skating and Ice Dance 2024" (PDF). International Skating Union. Archived (PDF) from the original on 3 June 2025.
