= Jean-Hans Fourneaux =

French ice dancer

- Fradji and Fourneaux at the 2025 Skate America

Personal information
- Born: 2 September 2003 (age 23) Mont-Saint-Aignan, France
- Home town: Rouen, France
- Height: 1.73 m (5 ft 8 in)

Figure skating career
- Country: France
- Partner: Célina Fradji
- Coach: Karine Arribert; Mahil Chantelauze
- Skating club: Villard-de-Lans Patinage
- Began skating: 2012

Jean-Hans Fourneaux (born 2 September 2003) is a French ice dancer. With his current skating partner Célina Fradji, he is the 2022 JGP France silver medalist and the 2022 French junior national champion.

== Personal life ==
Jean-Hans Fourneaux was born on 2 September 2003 in Mont-Saint-Aignan, France.

== Career ==
=== Early career ===
Jean-Hans Fourneaux met Célina Fradji in 2017 and they began competing internationally together.

Fradji/Fourneaux competing their rhythm dance at the 2020 Winter Youth Olympics

=== 2019–20 season: Junior international debut ===
Fradji and Fourneaux made their debut on the Junior Grand Prix circuit in August as one of the host picks at the 2019 JGP France, where they finished tenth overall. While they did not receive a second JGP assignment, Fradji and Fourneaux placed fourth in the junior dance category at the Master's de Patinage, and sixth and seventh respectively at their two autumn assignments: the 2019 Mezzaluna Cup and the 2019 Pavel Roman Memorial.

In January 2020, Fradji and Fourneaux competed at the 2020 Winter Youth Olympics in Lausanne, Switzerland. They finished tenth overall in the individual event. In the mixed team event, Fradji and Fourneaux were named to Team Discovery alongside Italian men's skater Nikolaj Memola, Canadian women's skater Catherine Carle, and Russian pair team Apollinariia Panfilova and Dmitry Rylov. Team Discovery finished in sixth place overall.

Fradji and Fourneaux concluded their season at the 2020 French Junior Championships, where they finished in third place.

=== 2020–21 season ===
The pair opened their season with a third place finish at the Santa Claus Cup. They later placed 5th at the Egna Dance Trophy.

Fradji/Fourneaux closed their season by finishing 4th at the 2021 French Championships.

=== 2021–22 season ===
Fradji/Fourneaux were assigned to two Junior Grand Prix events, one in France, the other in Russia. They placed fifth and seventh respectively.

In October, the pair placed sixth at the Cup of Nice, as well as second at the 2021 Open d'Andorra.

In February, they won the 2022 French Junior Championships.

The pair subsequently made their World Junior Championships debut in Tallinn, Estonia. They finished the event in ninth place, scoring a new personal best in the short program segment.

=== 2022–23 season: Grand Prix medals ===
Assigned to both the Junior Grand Prix in France and Poland, Fradji/Fourneaux won silver and bronze medals respectively. These results led them to qualifying for the Junior Grand Prix Final. They later won the Cup of Nice for a second consecutive year.

In December at the Grand Prix Final in Torino, Italy, Fradji/Fourneaux placed sixth in both competition segments, thus finishing sixth overall.

In February, the pair placed second at the French Junior Championships. They later closed their season with a sixth place finish at the 2023 Junior World Championships.

=== 2023–24 season: Grand Prix medals, Top 4 at Junior Worlds ===
Fradji/Fourneaux competed at the Junior Grand Prix stages in Thailand and Japan, winning silver and bronze medals. These results allowed them to qualify for the Final for a second consecutive year. The team finished fourth at the final.

The pair subsequently won silver medals at the 2024 French Junior Championships and the Egna Dance Trophy.

Fradji/Fourneaux finished their season placing fourth at the 2024 Junior World Championships. “One of my favorite memories was our free dance at 2024 Junior Worlds in Taipei,” recalled Fradji. “It was a great destination, a great trip, and we skated well. We were so close to the podium!”

=== 2024–25 season: Grand Prix gold ===
Fradji/Fourneaux performing their rhythm dance at the 2025 Skate America

Fradji/Fourneaux began their season winning the gold medal at the Junior Grand Prix in the Czech Republic. Fourneaux shared, “After six medals, to finally get the gold! It was really special.” The team subsequently won silver in Slovenia, qualifiying for the Final for the third time in their career. At the final, the team finished in fifth overall.

Later, the team won gold medals at the Sofia Trophy, Egna Dance Trophy and the 2025 French Junior Championships.

Fradji/Fourneaux performing their free dance at the 2025 Skate America

They closed what would be their final junior season by placing fifth at the 2025 World Junior Championships.

=== 2025–26 season: Senior debut ===
Fradji/Fourneaux debuted internationally on the Challenger Series at the Nepela Memorial in September, placing eighth. They later placed 6th at the Trialeti Trophy; garnering new personal best scores in the free skate and overall.

Chosen as a host pick for the senior Grand Prix, 2025 Grand Prix de France, the pair finished in tenth place. “Being selected for the Grand Prix de France is a huge honor for us, especially since it’s our very first senior season” shared Fradji. They followed this by finishing in tenth place at the 2025 Skate America. The next month, the team placed eighth at the Golden Spin of Zagreb.

Fradji/Fourneaux concluded the season with a sixth place result at the 2026 French Championships, and bronze at the Challenge Cup.

== Programs ==
=== Ice dance with Fradji ===
| Season | Rhythm dance | Free dance | Exhibition |
|---|---|---|---|
| 2026–2027 | Vals Azul by Florindo Sassone; Grand Guignol by Bajofondo | Selections from the Sinners soundtrack | Bug a Boo; Bills, Bills, Bills by Destiny's Child |
| 2025–2026 | Bug a Boo; Bills, Bills, Bills by Destiny's Child | Reminiscence by Olafur Arnalds, Alice Sara Ott; Second Self-Portrait Series by Rachel's; Protest by Philip Glass, Jóhann Jóhannsson | |
| 2024–2025 | In the Navy; YMCA by Village People | "Exogenesis: Symphony" Parts 1 and 3 by Muse choreo. by Karrine Arribert and Mahil Chantelauze | |
| 2023–2024 | Still Loving You by Scorpions; Back in Black by ACDC | Partida; Portio Dio by Rascasuelos | |
| 2022–23 | Tango: Gringo Nr. 1 by Tango for 3 arr. by Hugo Chouinard | Agape by Dead Can Dance; Epidauros by Rajna arr. by Hugo Chouinard; Ya Nas by Bachar Mar-Khalifé | |
| 2021–22 | Blues: Ain't No Sunshine performed by Michael Jackson; Disco: Blame It on the Boogie by The Jackson 5 | The Matrix: Clubbed to Death performed by Maxence Cyrin; Clubbed to Death by Rob Dougan | |
| 2019–21 | Foxtrot: Singin' in the Rain performed by Gene Kelly; Quickstep: Copacabana by Barry Manilow choreo. by Laurie May | Come, Gentle Night (from Romeo & Juliet) by Abel Korzeniowski; Rue des Cascades by Claire Pichet choreo. by Laurie May | |

== Competitive highlights ==
=== Ice dance with Fradji ===
Competition placements at senior level
| Season | 2025–26 | 2026–27 |
|---|---|---|
| French Championships | 6th | |
| GP America | 10th | |
| GP France | 10th | 9th |
| CS Trialeti Trophy | 6th | |
| CS Nepela Memorial | 8th | |
| CS Golden Spin | 8th | |
| CS Lombardia Trophy | | 7th |
| Finnish Ice Dance Open | 2nd | |
| Challenge Cup | 3rd | |

Competition placements at junior level
| Season | 2016–17 | 2017–18 | 2018–19 | 2019–20 | 2020–21 | 2021–22 | 2022–23 | 2023–24 | 2024–25 |
|---|---|---|---|---|---|---|---|---|---|
| Winter Youth Olympics | | | | 10th | | | | | |
| World Junior Championships | | | | | | 9th | 6th | 4th | 5th |
| JGP Final | | | | | | | 6th | 4th | 5th |
| JGP France | | | | 10th | | 5th | 2nd | | |
| JGP Japan | | | | | | | | 3rd | |
| JGP Poland | | | | | | | 3rd | | |
| JGP Russia | | | | | | 7th | | | |
| JGP Thailand | | | | | | | | 2nd | |
| JGP Czech Republic | | | | | | | | | 1st |
| JGP Slovenia | | | | | | | | | 2nd |
| Mentor Toruń Cup | | | 10th N | | | | | | |
| Mezzaluna Cup | | | | 6th | | | | 1st | |
| Open d'Andorra | | | | | | 2nd | | | |
| Pavel Roman Memorial | | | | 7th | | | | | 1st |
| Santa Claus Cup | | | | | 3rd | | | | |
| Trophée Métropole Nice | | | | | | 6th | 1st | | 1st |
| Volvo Open Cup | | 7th N | | | | | | | |
| Ice Challenge | | | | | | 10th | | | |
| Master's de Patinage | | | | 4th | 4th | 2nd | 1st | 1st | |
| Egna Dance Trophy | | | | | 5th | | | | 1st |
| Sofia Trophy | | | | | | | | | 1st |
| French Championships | 3rd N | 2nd N | 3rd N | 3rd J | 4th J | 1st J | 2nd J | 2nd J | 1st J |

- JGP – Event of the ISU Junior Grand Prix Series
- J – Junior level, N – Novice level

== Detailed results ==
=== Ice dance with Célina Fradji ===
ISU personal best scores in the +5/-5 GOE System
| Segment | Type | Score | Event |
|---|---|---|---|
| Total | TSS | 165.37 | 2025 CS Trialeti Trophy |
| Rhythm dance | TSS | 66.94 | 2024 JGP Slovenia |
| Rhythm dance | TES | 37.82 | 2022 JGP Poland |
| Rhythm dance | PCS | 29.69 | 2024 JGP Slovenia |
| Free dance | TSS | 101.20 | 2025 CS Trialeti Trophy |
| Free dance | TES | 58.50 | 2025 CS Trialeti Trophy |
| Free dance | PCS | 45.00 | 2025 World Junior Championships |

Senior Level

Results in the 2025-26 season
| Date | Event | RD | | FD | | Total | |
| Date | Event | P | Score | P | Score | P | Score |
|---|---|---|---|---|---|---|---|
| Aug 28-30, 2025 | (France) 2025 Master’s de Patinage | 6 | 63.05 | 6 | 93.97 | 6 | 157.02 |
| Sep 25-27, 2025 | (Slovakia) 2025 CS Nepela Memorial | 8 | 65.18 | 8 | 98.42 | 8 | 163.60 |
| Oct 8-11, 2025 | (Georgia (country)) 2025 CS Trialeti Trophy | 6 | 64.17 | 5 | 101.20 | 6 | 165.37 |
| Oct 17-19, 2025 | 2025 Grand Prix de France | 10 | 56.92 | 10 | 92.00 | 10 | 148.92 |
| Nov 14-16, 2025 | (United States) 2025 Skate America | 10 | 56.21 | 10 | 88.33 | 10 | 144.54 |
| Dec 3-6, 2025 | (Croatia) 2025 CS Golden Spin of Zagreb | 6 | 65.69 | 9 | 97.22 | 8 | 162.91 |
| Dec 18-20, 2025 | (France) 2026 French Championships | 6 | 64.84 | 7 | 92.40 | 6 | 157.24 |
| Jan 22–25, 2026 | (Netherlands) 2026 International Challenge Cup | 3 | 63.02 | 3 | 104.11 | 3 | 167.13 |

Results in the 2026-27 season
| Date | Event | RD | | FD | | Total | |
| Date | Event | P | Score | P | Score | P | Score |
|---|---|---|---|---|---|---|---|
| Aug 27-29, 2026 | (France) 2026 Master’s de Patinage | 5 | 57.40 | - | - | - | WD |
| Sep 17-20, 2026 | (Italy) 2026 CS Lombardia Trophy | 5 | 65.85 | 8 | 95.71 | 7 | 161.56 |
| Oct 23-25, 2026 | 2026 Grand Prix de France | 9 | 62.40 | 9 | 88.84 | 9 | 151.24 |

Junior Level

Results in the 2019-20 season
| Date | Event | RD | | FD | | Total | |
| Date | Event | P | Score | P | Score | P | Score |
|---|---|---|---|---|---|---|---|
| Aug 21-24, 2019 | 2019 JGP France | 9 | 50.44 | 10 | 78.33 | 10 | 128.77 |
| Sep 26-28, 2019 | (France) 2019 Master’s de Patinage | 4 | 47.42 | 4 | 78.48 | 4 | 125.90 |
| Oct 4-6, 2019 | (Italy) 2019 Mezzaluna Cup | 6 | 47.97 | 5 | 79.65 | 6 | 127.62 |
| Nov 8-10, 2019 | (Czech Republic) 2019 Pavel Roman Memorial | 8 | 45.32 | 7 | 78.22 | 7 | 123.54 |
| Jan 10-15, 2020 | (Switzerland) 2020 Winter Youth Olympics | 9 | 49.11 | 10 | 72.13 | 10 | 121.24 |
| Jan 10-15, 2020 | (Switzerland) 2020 Winter Youth Olympics - Team trophy | - | - | 7 | 75.86 | 6 | - |
| Feb 7-9, 2020 | (France) 2020 French Championships (Junior) | 3 | 55.66 | 4 | 86.54 | 3 | 142.20 |

Results in the 2020-21 season
| Date | Event | RD | | FD | | Total | |
| Date | Event | P | Score | P | Score | P | Score |
|---|---|---|---|---|---|---|---|
| Oct 1-3, 2020 | (France) 2020 Master’s de Patinage | 5 | 43.26 | 4 | 79.09 | 4 | 122.35 |
| Nov 26-29, 2020 | (Hungary) 2020 Santa Claus Cup | 4 | 48.56 | 3 | 75.94 | 3 | 124.50 |
| Feb 6-7, 2020 | (Italy) 2021 Egna Dance Trophy | 6 | 49.58 | 5 | 76.75 | 5 | 126.33 |
| Apr 3-4, 2021 | (France) 2021 French Championships (Junior) | 5 | 48.51 | 4 | 80.44 | 4 | 128.95 |

Results in the 2021-22 season
| Date | Event | RD | | FD | | Total | |
| Date | Event | P | Score | P | Score | P | Score |
|---|---|---|---|---|---|---|---|
| Aug 18-21, 2021 | 2021 JGP France I | 5 | 54.42 | 6 | 80.91 | 5 | 135.33 |
| Sep 15-18, 2021 | 2021 JGP Russia | 7 | 57.25 | 8 | 89.02 | 7 | 146.27 |
| Sep 30-Oct 2, 2021 | (France) 2021 Master’s de Patinage | 2 | 55.76 | 1 | 86.51 | 2 | 142.27 |
| Oct 20-24, 2021 | (France) 2021 Cup of Nice | 8 | 47.36 | 6 | 71.60 | 6 | 118.96 |
| Nov 24-28, 2021 | 2021 Open d’Andorra | 2 | 54.41 | 1 | 80.65 | 2 | 135.06 |
| Feb 4-6, 2022 | (France) 2022 French Championships (Junior) | 1 | 61.41 | 1 | 94.48 | 1 | 155.89 |
| Apr 13-17, 2022 | (Estonia) 2022 World Junior Championships | 8 | 57.36 | 10 | 83.00 | 9 | 140.36 |

Results in the 2022-23 season
| Date | Event | RD | | FD | | Total | |
| Date | Event | P | Score | P | Score | P | Score |
|---|---|---|---|---|---|---|---|
| Aug 24-27, 2022 | 2022 JGP France | 2 | 59.57 | 2 | 88.09 | 2 | 147.66 |
| Sep 28-Oct 1, 2022 | 2022 JGP Poland | 2 | 65.23 | 3 | 91.88 | 3 | 157.11 |
| Oct 6-8, 2022 | (France) 2022 Master’s de Patinage | 1 | 65.65 | 1 | 90.27 | 1 | 155.92 |
| Oct 18-23, 2022 | (France) 2022 Cup of Nice | 1 | 60.47 | 1 | 92.63 | 1 | 153.10 |
| Dec 8-11, 2022 | (Italy) 2022-23 Junior Grand Prix Final | 6 | 59.23 | 6 | 81.48 | 6 | 140.71 |
| Feb 3-5, 2023 | (France) 2023 French Championships (Junior) | 1 | 64.26 | 2 | 90.66 | 2 | 154.92 |
| Feb 17-Mar 5, 2023 | (Canada) 2023 World Junior Championships | 5 | 65.81 | 8 | 91.11 | 6 | 156.92 |

Results in the 2023-24 season
| Date | Event | RD | | FD | | Total | |
| Date | Event | P | Score | P | Score | P | Score |
|---|---|---|---|---|---|---|---|
| Aug 23-26, 2023 | 2023 JGP Thailand | 2 | 61.11 | 2 | 89.87 | 2 | 150.98 |
| Sep 13-16, 2023 | 2023 JGP Japan | 3 | 61.34 | 3 | 89.79 | 3 | 151.13 |
| Sep 28-30, 2023 | (France) 2023 Master’s de Patinage | 1 | 63.75 | 1 | 95.12 | 1 | 158.87 |
| Oct 20-22, 2023 | (Italy) 2023 Mezzaluna Cup | 2 | 60.54 | 1 | 95.82 | 1 | 156.36 |
| Dec 7-10, 2023 | (China) 2023-24 Junior Grand Prix Final | 4 | 61.60 | 4 | 91.82 | 4 | 153.42 |
| Jan 12-14, 2024 | (France) 2024 French Championships (Junior) | 2 | 62.88 | 2 | 97.61 | 2 | 160.49 |
| Feb 8-11, 2024 | (Italy) 2024 Egna Dance Trophy | 2 | 64.12 | 2 | 95.86 | 2 | 159.98 |
| Feb 26-Mar 3, 2024 | (Chinese Taipei) 2024 World Junior Championships | 6 | 61.52 | 4 | 95.14 | 4 | 156.66 |

Results in the 2024-25 season
| Date | Event | RD | | FD | | Total | |
| Date | Event | P | Score | P | Score | P | Score |
|---|---|---|---|---|---|---|---|
| Sep 4-7, 2024 | 2024 JGP Czech Republic | 1 | 64.80 | 1 | 93.86 | 1 | 158.66 |
| Sep 26-28, 2024 | (France) 2024 Master’s de Patinage | 1 | 70.89 | 1 | 99.43 | 1 | 170.32 |
| Oct 2-5, 2024 | 2024 JGP Slovenia | 2 | 66.94 | 3 | 95.92 | 2 | 162.86 |
| Oct 16-20, 2024 | (France) 2024 Cup of Nice | 1 | 65.46 | - | - | 1 | 65.46 |
| Nov 8-10, 2024 | (Czech Republic) 2024 Pavel Roman Memorial | 1 | 67.02 | 1 | 95.45 | 1 | 162.47 |
| Dec 5-8, 2024 | (France) 2024-25 Junior Grand Prix Final | 4 | 63.24 | 5 | 88.46 | 5 | 151.70 |
| Jan 9-11, 2025 | (Bulgaria) 2025 Sofia Trophy | 1 | 69.33 | 1 | 104.96 | 1 | 174.29 |
| Jan 31-Feb 2, 2025 | (France) 2025 French Championships (Junior) | 1 | 72.64 | 1 | 102.24 | 1 | 174.88 |
| Feb 7-9, 2025 | (Italy) 2025 Egna Dance Trophy | 1 | 67.34 | 1 | 99.82 | 1 | 167.16 |
| Feb 24-Mar 2, 2025 | (Hungary) 2025 World Junior Championships | 4 | 62.87 | 5 | 94.84 | 5 | 157.71 |
