= Célina Fradji =

French ice dancer

- Fradji and Fourneaux at the 2025 Skate America

Personal information
- Born: 10 July 2005 (age 21) Arpajon, France
- Home town: Brétigny-sur-Orge, France
- Height: 1.60 m (5 ft 3 in)

Figure skating career
- Country: France
- Partner: Jean-Hans Fourneaux
- Coach: Karine Arribert; Mahil Chantelauze
- Skating club: Villard de Lans
- Began skating: 2010

Célina Fradji (born 10 July 2005) is a French ice dancer. With her skating partner Jean-Hans Fourneaux, she is the 2022 JGP France silver medalist and the 2022 French junior national champion.

== Personal life ==
Celina Fradji was born on 10 July 2005 in Arpajon, France.

== Career ==
=== Early career ===
Fradji began skating in 2010 at the age of four, inspired by her older sister. She began training in ice dance at 7 years old, but continued to compete as a single skater up to the advanced novice level through the 2018–19 season. She first met her current skating partner, Jean-Hans Fourneaux, when she was 11 years old, and the team began competing together internationally in 2017.

Fradji/Fourneaux competing their rhythm dance at the 2020 Winter Youth Olympics

=== 2019–20 season: Junior international debut ===
Fradji and Fourneaux made their debut on the Junior Grand Prix circuit in August as one of the host picks at the 2019 JGP France, where they finished tenth overall. While they did not receive a second JGP assignment, Fradji and Fourneaux placed fourth in the junior dance category at the Master's de Patinage, and sixth and seventh respectively at their two autumn assignments: the 2019 Mezzaluna Cup and the 2019 Pavel Roman Memorial.

In January 2020, Fradji and Fourneaux competed at the 2020 Winter Youth Olympics in Lausanne, Switzerland. They finished tenth overall in the individual event. In the mixed team event, Fradji and Fourneaux were named to Team Discovery alongside Italian men's skater Nikolaj Memola, Canadian women's skater Catherine Carle, and Russian pair team Apollinariia Panfilova and Dmitry Rylov. Team Discovery finished in sixth place overall.

Fradji and Fourneaux concluded their season at the 2020 French Junior Championships, where they finished in third place.

=== 2020–21 season ===
The pair opened their season with a third place finish at the Santa Claus Cup. They later placed 5th at the Egna Dance Trophy.

Fradji/Fourneaux closed their season by finishing 4th at the 2021 French Championships.

=== 2021–22 season ===
Fradji/Fourneaux were assigned to two Junior Grand Prix events, one in France, the other in Russia. They placed fifth and seventh respectively.

In October, the pair placed sixth at the Cup of Nice, as well as second at the 2021 Open d'Andorra.

In February, they won the 2022 French Junior Championships.

The pair subsequently made their World Junior Championships debut in Tallinn, Estonia. They finished the event in ninth place, scoring a new personal best in the short program segment.

=== 2022–23 season: Grand Prix medals ===
Assigned to both the Junior Grand Prix in France and Poland, Fradji/Fourneaux won silver and bronze medals respectively. These results led them to qualifying for the Junior Grand Prix Final. They later won the Cup of Nice for a second consecutive year.

In December at the Grand Prix Final in Torino, Italy, Fradji/Fourneaux placed sixth in both competition segments, thus finishing sixth overall.

In February, the pair placed second at the French Junior Championships. They later closed their season with a sixth place finish at the 2023 Junior World Championships.

=== 2023–24 season: Grand Prix medals, Top 4 at Junior Worlds ===
Fradji/Fourneaux competed at the Junior Grand Prix stages in Thailand and Japan, winning silver and bronze medals. These results allowed them to qualify for the Final for a second consecutive year. The team finished fourth at the final.

The pair subsequently won silver medals at the 2024 French Junior Championships and the Egna Dance Trophy.

Fradji/Fourneaux finished their season placing fourth at the 2024 Junior World Championships.

=== 2024–25 season: Grand Prix gold ===
Fradji/Fourneaux performing their rhythm dance at the 2025 Skate America

Fradji/Fourneaux began their season winning the gold medal at the Junior Grand Prix in the Czech Republic. Fourneaux shared, “After six medals, to finally get the gold! It was really special.” The team subsequently won silver in Slovenia, qualifying for the Final for the third time in their career. At the final, the team finished in fifth overall.

Later, the team won gold medals at the Sofia Trophy, Egna Dance Trophy and the 2025 French Junior Championships.

Fradji/Fourneaux performing their free dance at the 2025 Skate America

They closed what would be their final junior season by placing fifth at the 2025 World Junior Championships.

=== 2025–26 season: Senior debut ===
Fradji/Fourneaux debuted internationally on the Challenger Series at the Nepela Memorial in September, placing eighth. They later placed 6th at the Trialeti Trophy; garnering new personal best scores in the free skate and overall.

Chosen as a host pick for the senior Grand Prix, 2025 Grand Prix de France, the pair finished in tenth place. "Being selected for the Grand Prix de France is a huge honor for us, especially since it’s our very first senior season" shared Fradji. They followed this by finishing in tenth place at the 2025 Skate America. The next month, the team placed eighth at the Golden Spin of Zagreb.

Fradji/Fourneaux concluded the season with a sixth place result at the 2026 French Championships, and bronze at the Challenge Cup.

== Programs ==
=== With Fourneaux ===
Season	Rhythm dance	Free dance	Exhibition
2026–2027	Vals Azul by Florindo Sassone; Grand Guignol by Bajofondo	Selections from the Sinners soundtrack	Bug a Boo; Bills, Bills, Bills by Destiny's Child
2025–2026	Bug a Boo; Bills, Bills, Bills by Destiny's Child	Reminiscence by Olafur Arnalds, Alice Sara Ott; Second Self-Portrait Series by Rachel's; Protest by Philip Glass, Jóhann Jóhannsson	
2024–2025	In the Navy; YMCA by Village People	"Exogenesis: Symphony" Parts 1 and 3 by Muse choreo. by Karrine Arribert and Mahil Chantelauze	
2023–2024	Still Loving You by Scorpions; Back in Black by ACDC	Partida; Portio Dio by Rascasuelos	
2022–2023	Tango: Gringo Nr. 1 by Tango for 3 arr. by Hugo Chouinard	Agape by Dead Can Dance; Epidauros by Rajna arr. by Hugo Chouinard; Ya Nas by Bachar Mar-Khalifé	
2021–2022	Blues: Ain't No Sunshine performed by Michael Jackson; Disco: Blame It on the Boogie by The Jackson 5	The Matrix: Clubbed to Death performed by Maxence Cyrin; Clubbed to Death by Rob Dougan	
2019–2021	Foxtrot: Singin' in the Rain performed by Gene Kelly; Quickstep: Copacabana by Barry Manilow choreo. by Laurie May	Come, Gentle Night (from Romeo & Juliet) by Abel Korzeniowski; Rue des Cascades by Claire Pichet choreo. by Laurie May	

== Competitive highlights ==
=== Ice dance with Fourneaux ===
- JGP – Event of the ISU Junior Grand Prix Series
- J – Junior level, N – Novice level

Competition placements at senior level
Season	2025–26	2026–27
French Championships	6th	
GP America	10th	
GP France	10th	9th
CS Trialeti Trophy	6th	
CS Nepela Memorial	8th	
CS Golden Spin	8th	
CS Lombardia Trophy		7th
Finnish Ice Dance Open	2nd	
Challenge Cup	3rd	

Competition placements at junior level
Season	2016–17	2017–18	2018–19	2019–20	2020–21	2021–22	2022–23	2023–24	2024–25
Winter Youth Olympics				10th					
World Junior Championships						9th	6th	4th	5th
JGP Final							6th	4th	5th
JGP France				10th		5th	2nd		
JGP Japan								3rd	
JGP Poland							3rd		
JGP Russia						7th			
JGP Thailand								2nd	
JGP Czech Republic									1st
JGP Slovenia									2nd
Mentor Toruń Cup			10th N						
Mezzaluna Cup				6th				1st	
Open d'Andorra						2nd			
Pavel Roman Memorial				7th					1st
Santa Claus Cup					3rd				
Trophée Métropole Nice						6th	1st		1st
Volvo Open Cup		7th N							
Ice Challenge						10th			
Master's de Patinage				4th	4th	2nd	1st	1st	
Egna Dance Trophy					5th				1st
Sofia Trophy									1st
French Championships	3rd N	2nd N	3rd N	3rd J	4th J	1st J	2nd J	2nd J	1st J

=== Women's singles ===
Competition placements at novice level
Season	2017–18	2018–19	2019–20
Grand Prix Bratislava		15th	
Santa Claus Cup	24th		
French Championships		13th	16th

== Detailed results ==
=== Ice dance with Jean-Hans Fourneaux ===
ISU personal best scores in the +5/-5 GOE System
Segment	Type	Score	Event
Total	TSS	165.37	2025 CS Trialeti Trophy
Rhythm dance	TSS	66.94	2024 JGP Slovenia
Rhythm dance	TES	37.82	2022 JGP Poland
Rhythm dance	PCS	29.69	2024 JGP Slovenia
Free dance	TSS	101.20	2025 CS Trialeti Trophy
Free dance	TES	58.50	2025 CS Trialeti Trophy
Free dance	PCS	45.00	2025 World Junior Championships

Senior Level

Results in the 2025-26 season
Date	Event	RD		FD		Total	
Date	Event	P	Score	P	Score	P	Score
Aug 28-30, 2025	(France) 2025 Master’s de Patinage	6	63.05	6	93.97	6	157.02
Sep 25-27, 2025	(Slovakia) 2025 CS Nepela Memorial	8	65.18	8	98.42	8	163.60
Oct 8-11, 2025	(Georgia (country)) 2025 CS Trialeti Trophy	6	64.17	5	101.20	6	165.37
Oct 17-19, 2025	2025 Grand Prix de France	10	56.92	10	92.00	10	148.92
Nov 14-16, 2025	(United States) 2025 Skate America	10	56.21	10	88.33	10	144.54
Dec 3-6, 2025	(Croatia) 2025 CS Golden Spin of Zagreb	6	65.69	9	97.22	8	162.91
Dec 18-20, 2025	(France) 2026 French Championships	6	64.84	7	92.40	6	157.24
Jan 22–25, 2026	(Netherlands) 2026 International Challenge Cup	3	63.02	3	104.11	3	167.13

Results in the 2026-27 season
Date	Event	RD		FD		Total	
Date	Event	P	Score	P	Score	P	Score
Aug 27-29, 2026	(France) 2026 Master’s de Patinage	5	57.40	-	-	-	WD
Sep 17-20, 2026	(Italy) 2026 CS Lombardia Trophy	5	65.85	8	95.71	7	161.56
Oct 23-25, 2026	2026 Grand Prix de France	9	62.40	9	88.84	9	151.24

Junior Level

Results in the 2019-20 season
Date	Event	RD		FD		Total	
Date	Event	P	Score	P	Score	P	Score
Aug 21-24, 2019	2019 JGP France	9	50.44	10	78.33	10	128.77
Sep 26-28, 2019	(France) 2019 Master’s de Patinage	4	47.42	4	78.48	4	125.90
Oct 4-6, 2019	(Italy) 2019 Mezzaluna Cup	6	47.97	5	79.65	6	127.62
Nov 8-10, 2019	(Czech Republic) 2019 Pavel Roman Memorial	8	45.32	7	78.22	7	123.54
Jan 10-15, 2020	(Switzerland) 2020 Winter Youth Olympics	9	49.11	10	72.13	10	121.24
Jan 10-15, 2020	(Switzerland) 2020 Winter Youth Olympics - Team trophy	-	-	7	75.86	6	-
Feb 7-9, 2020	(France) 2020 French Championships (Junior)	3	55.66	4	86.54	3	142.20

Results in the 2020-21 season
Date	Event	RD		FD		Total	
Date	Event	P	Score	P	Score	P	Score
Oct 1-3, 2020	(France) 2020 Master’s de Patinage	5	43.26	4	79.09	4	122.35
Nov 26-29, 2020	(Hungary) 2020 Santa Claus Cup	4	48.56	3	75.94	3	124.50
Feb 6-7, 2020	(Italy) 2021 Egna Dance Trophy	6	49.58	5	76.75	5	126.33
Apr 3-4, 2021	(France) 2021 French Championships (Junior)	5	48.51	4	80.44	4	128.95

Results in the 2021-22 season
Date	Event	RD		FD		Total	
Date	Event	P	Score	P	Score	P	Score
Aug 18-21, 2021	2021 JGP France I	5	54.42	6	80.91	5	135.33
Sep 15-18, 2021	2021 JGP Russia	7	57.25	8	89.02	7	146.27
Sep 30-Oct 2, 2021	(France) 2021 Master’s de Patinage	2	55.76	1	86.51	2	142.27
Oct 20-24, 2021	(France) 2021 Cup of Nice	8	47.36	6	71.60	6	118.96
Nov 24-28, 2021	2021 Open d’Andorra	2	54.41	1	80.65	2	135.06
Feb 4-6, 2022	(France) 2022 French Championships (Junior)	1	61.41	1	94.48	1	155.89
Apr 13-17, 2022	(Estonia) 2022 World Junior Championships	8	57.36	10	83.00	9	140.36

Results in the 2022-23 season
Date	Event	RD		FD		Total	
Date	Event	P	Score	P	Score	P	Score
Aug 24-27, 2022	2022 JGP France	2	59.57	2	88.09	2	147.66
Sep 28-Oct 1, 2022	2022 JGP Poland	2	65.23	3	91.88	3	157.11
Oct 6-8, 2022	(France) 2022 Master’s de Patinage	1	65.65	1	90.27	1	155.92
Oct 18-23, 2022	(France) 2022 Cup of Nice	1	60.47	1	92.63	1	153.10
Dec 8-11, 2022	(Italy) 2022-23 Junior Grand Prix Final	6	59.23	6	81.48	6	140.71
Feb 3-5, 2023	(France) 2023 French Championships (Junior)	1	64.26	2	90.66	2	154.92
Feb 17-Mar 5, 2023	(Canada) 2023 World Junior Championships	5	65.81	8	91.11	6	156.92

Results in the 2023-24 season
Date	Event	RD		FD		Total	
Date	Event	P	Score	P	Score	P	Score
Aug 23-26, 2023	2023 JGP Thailand	2	61.11	2	89.87	2	150.98
Sep 13-16, 2023	2023 JGP Japan	3	61.34	3	89.79	3	151.13
Sep 28-30, 2023	(France) 2023 Master’s de Patinage	1	63.75	1	95.12	1	158.87
Oct 20-22, 2023	(Italy) 2023 Mezzaluna Cup	2	60.54	1	95.82	1	156.36
Dec 7-10, 2023	(China) 2023-24 Junior Grand Prix Final	4	61.60	4	91.82	4	153.42
Jan 12-14, 2024	(France) 2024 French Championships (Junior)	2	62.88	2	97.61	2	160.49
Feb 8-11, 2024	(Italy) 2024 Egna Dance Trophy	2	64.12	2	95.86	2	159.98
Feb 26-Mar 3, 2024	(Chinese Taipei) 2024 World Junior Championships	6	61.52	4	95.14	4	156.66

Results in the 2024-25 season
Date	Event	RD		FD		Total	
Date	Event	P	Score	P	Score	P	Score
Sep 4-7, 2024	2024 JGP Czech Republic	1	64.80	1	93.86	1	158.66
Sep 26-28, 2024	(France) 2024 Master’s de Patinage	1	70.89	1	99.43	1	170.32
Oct 2-5, 2024	2024 JGP Slovenia	2	66.94	3	95.92	2	162.86
Oct 16-20, 2024	(France) 2024 Cup of Nice	1	65.46	-	-	1	65.46
Nov 8-10, 2024	(Czech Republic) 2024 Pavel Roman Memorial	1	67.02	1	95.45	1	162.47
Dec 5-8, 2024	(France) 2024-25 Junior Grand Prix Final	4	63.24	5	88.46	5	151.70
Jan 9-11, 2025	(Bulgaria) 2025 Sofia Trophy	1	69.33	1	104.96	1	174.29
Jan 31-Feb 2, 2025	(France) 2025 French Championships (Junior)	1	72.64	1	102.24	1	174.88
Feb 7-9, 2025	(Italy) 2025 Egna Dance Trophy	1	67.34	1	99.82	1	167.16
Feb 24-Mar 2, 2025	(Hungary) 2025 World Junior Championships	4	62.87	5	94.84	5	157.71
