= Maxence Cyrin =

- Born: January 30, 1971 (age 55) in Besançon, France
- Origin: Paris, France
- Label: Evidence Classics

Maxence Cyrin (born 30 January 1971) is a French pianist and composer living in Paris. His second album Novö Piano released in 2009, contained a piano cover of the Pixies song "Where Is My Mind?". This version has appeared in numerous television shows including The Leftovers, Mr. Robot and black-ish.

== Early life ==
As a child, Cyrin studied classical piano at a conservatory. In his teenage years, he was exposed to new-wave and techno music, greatly influencing his first recordings, also made during these years. He subsequently made recordings with independent electro labels. A few years later, he recorded an LP of piano compositions titled Instants on independent record label Sine Terra Firma, which has also released Yann Tiersen's debut album.

== From pop to classical music ==
In 2005, he released his first album Modern Rhapsodies on FCom, the label founded by DJ Laurent Garnier, in which he arranged four solo piano tracks from Massive Attack, Depeche Mode, Moby, and Aphex Twin. He also composed scores for silent movies, such as Jean Epstein's 1923 film Cœur fidèle.

Novö Piano, Cyrin's second album, was released in 2009 through Kwaidan Records and produced by Marc Collin of Nouvelle Vague. It contains cover songs of Pixies, Nirvana, Daft Punk, and MGMT, among others. As of 2017, the music video for Cyrin's cover of Pixies' "Where Is My Mind?" has been viewed over seven million times on YouTube – his version of the song was used in the TV shows The Leftovers, Mr. Robot and black-ish in addition to the TV spot for the video game Uncharted 4: A Thief's End. It also features in the 2015 film Man Up.

In 2012, the album The Fantasist was released on the record label EOS Records. It is, at the same time, a musical self-portrait and an imaginary movie soundtrack.

In 2014, he signed with the new classical record label Evidence Classics, founded by sound engineer Nicolas Bartholomée (Aparté). In 2015, he released the album Nocturnes, a collection of ten compositions for solo piano.

Cyrin's album Novö Piano 2 was released on November 13, 2015, and is another collection of solo piano covers.

In June 2016, he performed in the USA for 3 weeks.

In September 2017, Apple used his piano version of Arcade Fire's song "No Cars Go" for the inauguration of The Steve Jobs Theater.

== Fashion industry involvement ==
He is regularly involved in world of fashion, composing and playing music for fashion shows including Chanel, Lanvin, Valentino, Margiela, and Hermès, and has participated in projects in the contemporary art world.

== Selected discography ==
=== Albums ===
- Modern Rhapsodies (2005) F Communications
- Novö Piano (2010) Kwaidan Records
- The Fantasist (2012) Ekler'o'shock
- Nocturnes (Solo Piano) (2014) Evidence/Little Tribeca
- Novö Piano 2 (2015) Evidence/Little Tribeca
