= 2020–21 national figure skating championships =

- Type: National championship
- Season: 2020–21
- Host: ISU member nations
- Previous: 2019–20
- Next: 2021–22

National figure skating championships for the 2020–21 season were scheduled to take place mainly from December 2020 to January 2021. They were held to crown national champions and served as part of the selection process for international events, such as the 2021 ISU Championships. Medals were awarded in the disciplines of men's singles, ladies' singles, pair skating, and ice dance. A few countries chose to organize their national championships together with their neighbors; the results were subsequently divided into national podiums.

== Competitions ==
Competition schedules were subject to change due to the ongoing global COVID-19 pandemic.

Key

Nationals	Other domestic

Date	Event	Type	Level	Disc.	Location	Refs
2020
August 2–3	Chinese Taipei Championships	Nat.	Sen.–Nov.	M/L	Taipei, Taiwan (Chinese Taipei)	
October 1–3	Master's de Patinage	Other	Sen.–Jun.	All	Villard-de-Lans, France	
October 24–27	New Zealand Championships	Nat.	Sen.–Nov.	M/L/D	Dunedin, New Zealand	
November 21–23	Japan Junior Champ.	Nat.	Junior	M/L/D	Hachinohe, Japan	
December 10–11	Serbian Championships	Nat.	Sen.–Nov.	L	Belgrade, Serbia	
December 10–12	Austrian Championships	Nat.	Sen.–Nov.	All	Linz, Austria	
December 10–12	Four Nationals (Czech/Polish/Slovak)	Nat.	Senior; Junior	All; P/D	Cieszyn, Poland	
December 11–13	Belarusian Championships (Note: Held as part of Winter Star, an international competition.)	Nat.	Senior	All	Minsk, Belarus	
December 11–13	Italian Championships	Nat.	Senior; Junior	All; D	Egna, Italy	
December 14–19	Kazakhstani Championships	Nat.	Sen.–Jun.	M/L	Almaty, Kazakhstan	
December 18–19	German Championships	Nat.	Senior; Jun.–Nov.	M/L/D; P/D	Dortmund, Germany (Note: Originally scheduled for Hamburg.)	
December 18–19	Hungarian Championships	Nat.	Senior	M/L/P	Budapest, Hungary	
December 23–27	Japan Championships	Nat.	Senior	M/L/D	Nagano, Japan	
December 23–27	Russian Championships	Nat.	Senior	All	Chelyabinsk, Russia	
2021
January 8–10	Skate Canada Challenge	Other	Sen.–Jun.	All	Virtual	
January 15–17	Skate Canada Challenge	Other	Sen.–Jun.	All	Virtual	
January 11–17	U.S. Championships	Nat.	Sen.–Jun.	All	Las Vegas, Nevada, U.S. (Note: Originally scheduled for San Jose, California)	
January 22–24	Belarusian Junior Champ.	Nat.	Junior	M/L/D	Minsk, Belarus	
January 29–31 (Note: Originally scheduled for December 11–13.)	Estonian Championships	Nat.	Senior	M/L	Tallinn, Estonia	
January 29–31 (Note: Originally scheduled for November 20–22 in Akureyri; cancelled in October before rescheduling.)	Icelandic Championships	Nat.	Sen.–Nov.	L	Reykjavík, Iceland	
January 29–31 (Note: Originally scheduled for December 11–13.)	Turkish Championships	Nat.	Sen.–Nov.	M/L	Ankara, Turkey	
February 1–5	Russian Junior Champ.	Nat.	Junior	All	Krasnoyarsk, Russia	
February 2–4	Ukrainian Junior Champ.	Nat.	Junior	All	Kyiv, Ukraine	
February 4–7	Hungarian Junior Champ.	Nat.	Senior; Junior	D M/L/D	Budapest, Hungary	
February 5–6 (Note: Originally scheduled for December 17–19; cancelled on November 16 before rescheduling.)	French Championships	Nat.	Senior	All	Vaujany, France	
February 5–7	Polish Junior Champ.	Nat.	Junior	M/L	Gdańsk, Poland	
February 23–24 (Note: Originally scheduled for December 17–20.)	Ukrainian Championships	Nat.	Senior	All	Kyiv, Ukraine	
February 24–26 (Note: Originally scheduled for January 8–10 in Seoul.)	South Korean Championships	Nat.	Sen.–Jun.	M/L/D	Uijeongbu, South Korea	
Feb. 26 – Mar. 2 (Note: Originally scheduled for February 23–27 in Veliky Novgorod.)	Russian Cup Final	Other	Sen.–Jun.	All	Moscow, Russia	
February 27–28 (Note: Originally scheduled for December 18–20 in Joensuu; cancelled on January 29 before rescheduling.)	Finnish Championships	Nat.	Senior	D	Helsinki, Finland	
March 6–7 (Note: Originally scheduled for December 19–20 and rescheduled for February 6–8.)	Lithuanian Championships	Nat.	Sen.–Nov. Novice	L M	Elektrėnai, Lithuania	
March 12–14 (Note: Originally scheduled for January 9–10.)	Estonian Junior Champ.	Nat.	Junior	M/L	Tallinn, Estonia	
March 19–21 (Note: Originally scheduled for December.)	Spanish Championships	Nat.	Senior; Jun.–Nov.	M/L/P; All	Valdemoro, Spain	
March 20–23 (Note: Originally scheduled for January 15–17.)	Norwegian Championships	Nat.	Senior	M/L	Virtual	
April 3–4 (Note: Originally scheduled for February 5–7 in Belfort.)	French Junior Champ.	Nat.	Junior	D	Villard-de-Lans, France	
April 9–11 (Note: Originally scheduled for December and rescheduled for March 19–21.)	Italian Junior Champ.	Nat.	Junior	M/L/P	Trento, Italy	
June 6-8	South African Championships	Nat.	Sen.–Nov.	M/L	Gauteng, South Africa	
June 28–29	Hong Kong Championships	Nat.	Sen.–Nov.	M/L	Kowloon Tong, Hong Kong	

=== Postponed ===
Date	Event	Type	Level	Disc.	Location	Refs
2020
TBD (Note: Originally scheduled for December 4–6.)	Danish Championships	Nat.	Sen.–Nov.	M/L	Frederikshavn, Denmark	
TBD (Note: Originally scheduled for December 11–13.)	Latvian Championships	Nat.	Sen.–Nov.	M/L/D	TBA, Latvia	
TBD (Note: Originally scheduled for December 12–13.)	Croatian Championships	Nat.	Sen.–Nov.	M/L	Zagreb, Croatia	
2021

=== Cancelled ===
Date	Event	Type	Level	Disc.	Location	Refs
2020
November 20–21	Belgian Championships	Nat.	Sen.–Nov.	M/L	Mechelen, Belgium	
Nov. 27 – Dec. 4	Australian Championships	Nat.	Sen.–Nov.	All	Boondall, Australia	
Nov. 30 – Dec. 6	British Championships	Nat.	Sen.–Nov.	All	Sheffield, England, U.K.	
December 10–13	Swedish Championships	Nat.	Sen.–Nov.	M/L/P	Linköping, Sweden	
2021
January 7–10 (Note: Originally scheduled for December.)	German Junior Champ.	Nat.	Jun.–Nov.	M/L	Dortmund, Germany	
February 5–7	Swiss Junior Champ.	Nat.	Jun.–Nov.	M/L	Basel, Switzerland	
February 8–14 (Note: Originally scheduled for January 11–17.)	Canadian Championships	Nat.	Sen.–Jun.	All	Vancouver, British Columbia, Canada	
February 19–20 (Note: Originally scheduled for December 12–13.)	Swiss Championships	Nat.	Senior; Jun.–Nov.	All; P/D	Lucerne, Switzerland	
TBD (Note: Originally scheduled for spring 2021.)	Irish Championships	Nat.	Sen.–Nov.	M/L	TBD, Ireland	

== Senior medalists ==
=== Senior men ===
Men
Nation	Gold	Silver	Bronze	Refs
Austria	Maurizio Zandron	Luc Maierhofer	Albert Mück	
Belarus	Konstantin Milyukov	Evgenij Puzanov	Nikolaj Kozlov	
Chinese Taipei	Che Yu Yeh	—N/a		
Czech Republic	Michal Březina	Jiří Bělohradský	Georgii Reshtenko	
Estonia	Aleksandr Selevko	Arlet Levandi	Mihhail Selevko	
France	Kévin Aymoz	Adam Siao Him Fa	Romain Ponsart	
Germany	Denis Gurdzhi	Louis Weissert	Fabian Piontek	
Hong Kong	Lap Kan Yuen	Harrison Jon-Yen Wong	Kwun Hung Leung	
Hungary	András Csernoch	Máté Böröcz	Alexander Maszljanko	
Italy	Daniel Grassl	Matteo Rizzo	Gabriele Frangipani	
Japan	Yuzuru Hanyu	Shoma Uno	Yuma Kagiyama	
Kazakhstan	Mikhail Shaidorov	Dias Jirenbayev	Dmitriy Karpukhin	
New Zealand	Douglas Gerber	—N/a		
Poland	Kornel Witkowski	Łukasz Kędzierski	Miłosz Witkowski	
Russia	Mikhail Kolyada	Makar Ignatov	Mark Kondratiuk	
Slovakia	Marco Klepoch	—N/a		
South Africa	Matthew Samuels	Evan Wrensch	Sinali Sango	
South Korea	Cha Jun-hwan	Lee Si-hyeong	Cha Young-hyun	
Spain	Tomás Guarino	Pablo García	—N/a	
Turkey	Burak Demirboğa	Başar Oktar	—N/a	
Ukraine	Ivan Shmuratko	Kyrylo Lishenko	Fedir Kulish	
United States	Nathan Chen	Vincent Zhou	Jason Brown	

=== Senior ladies ===
Ladies
Nation	Gold	Silver	Bronze	Refs
Austria	Olga Mikutina	Sophia Schaller	Anita Kapferer	
Belarus	Viktoriia Safonova	Aliaksandra Chepeleva	Alesya Kolesnikova	
Czech Republic	Eliška Březinová	Nikola Rychtařiková	Olusa Gajdosova	
Estonia	Eva-Lotta Kiibus	Gerli Liinamäe	Kristina Škuleta-Gromova	
France	Léa Serna	Maïa Mazzara	Lola Ghozali	
Germany	Aya Hatakawa	Nathalie Weinzierl	Dora Hus	
Hong Kong	Joanna So	Cheuk Ka Kahlen Cheung	Hiu Yau Chow	
Hungary	Júlia Láng	Regina Schermann	Bernadett Szigeti	
Iceland	Aldís Kara Bergsdóttir	—N/a		
Italy	Lara Naki Gutmann	Ginevra Lavinia Negrello	Lucrezia Beccari	
Japan	Rika Kihira	Kaori Sakamoto	Satoko Miyahara	
Kazakhstan	Mariya Grechanaya	Azhar Zhumakhanova	Anastassiya Lobanova	
New Zealand	Ruth Xu	—N/a		
Norway	Frida Turiddotter Berge	Silja Anna Skulstad Urang	—N/a	
Poland	Ekaterina Kurakova	Elżbieta Gabryszak	Natalia Lerka	
Russia	Anna Shcherbakova	Kamila Valieva	Alexandra Trusova	
Serbia	Leona Rogić	Nevena Mihajlović	Zona Apostolović	
Slovakia	Nicole Rajičová	Alexandra Michaela Filcová	Ema Doboszová	
South Africa	Kathryn Winstanley	—N/a		
South Korea	Kim Ye-lim	Yun Ah-sun	Lee Hae-in	
Spain	Marian Millares	Lucía Ruíz Manzano	—N/a	
Turkey	Zeynep Dilruba Sanoğlu	Sinem Pekder	Yasemin Zeki	
Ukraine	Anastasiia Shabotova	Taisiya Spesivtseva	Mariia Andriichuk	
United States	Bradie Tennell	Amber Glenn	Karen Chen	

=== Senior pairs ===
Pairs
Nation	Gold	Silver	Bronze	Refs
Austria	Miriam Ziegler / Severin Kiefer	—N/a		
Belarus	Bogdana Lukashevich / Alexander Stepanov	—N/a		
Czech Republic	Elizaveta Zhuk / Martin Bidař	—N/a		
France	Cléo Hamon / Denys Strekalin	Coline Keriven / Noël-Antoine Pierre	—N/a	
Hungary	Ioulia Chtchetinina / Márk Magyar	—N/a		
Italy	Nicole Della Monica / Matteo Guarise	Rebecca Ghilardi / Filippo Ambrosini	Sara Conti / Niccolò Macii	
Russia	Evgenia Tarasova / Vladimir Morozov	Aleksandra Boikova / Dmitrii Kozlovskii	Daria Pavliuchenko / Denis Khodykin	
Spain	Laura Barquero / Marco Zandron	Dorota Broda / Pedro Betegón Martín	—N/a	
Ukraine	Violetta Sierova / Ivan Khobta	Sofiia Holichenko / Artem Darenskyi	—N/a	
United States	Alexa Scimeca Knierim / Brandon Frazier	Jessica Calalang / Brian Johnson	Ashley Cain-Gribble / Timothy LeDuc	

=== Senior ice dance ===
Ice dance
Nation	Gold	Silver	Bronze	Refs
Belarus	Viktoria Semenjuk / Ilya Yukhimuk	Karina Sidarenka / Maksim Yalenich	—N/a	
Finland	Arina Klinovitskaya / Jussiville Partanen	—N/a		
France	Adelina Galyavieva / Louis Thauron	Evgeniia Lopareva / Geoffrey Brissaud	—N/a	
Germany	Katharina Müller / Tim Dieck	—N/a		
Hungary	Anna Yanovskaya / Ádám Lukács	Emese Csiszér / Axel Lamasse	—N/a	
Italy	Charlène Guignard / Marco Fabbri	Carolina Moscheni / Francesco Fioretti	Chiara Calderone / Francesco Riva	
Japan	Misato Komatsubara / Tim Koleto	Kana Muramoto / Daisuke Takahashi	Rikako Fukase / Eichu Cho	
Poland	Natalia Kaliszek / Maksym Spodyriev	Anastasia Polibina / Pavel Golovishnikov	Jenna Hertenstein / Damian Binkowski	
Russia	Alexandra Stepanova / Ivan Bukin	Tiffany Zahorski / Jonathan Guerreiro	Anastasia Skoptsova / Kirill Aleshin	
Ukraine	Oleksandra Nazarova / Maksym Nikitin	Mariia Golubtsova / Kyryl Belobrov	Darya Popova / Volodymyr Byelikov	
United States	Madison Hubbell / Zachary Donohue	Madison Chock / Evan Bates	Kaitlin Hawayek / Jean-Luc Baker	

== Junior medalists ==
=== Junior men ===
Junior men
Nation	Gold	Silver	Bronze	Refs
Austria	Alexander Charnagalov	Patrik Huber	Nuwan David Rondon	
Belarus	Aleksandr Lebedev	Yauhenii Puzanau	Mikalai Kazlou	
Chinese Taipei	Li Yu-Hsiang	Zhou Guan-Ting	Huang Yu-Chun	
Hong Kong	Chiu Hei Cheung	Heung Lai Zhao	Chit Wang Chao	
Hungary	Aleksandr Vlasenko	—N/a		
Italy	Raffaele Francesco Zich	Nikolaj Memola	Matteo Nalbone	
Japan	Lucas Tsuyoshi Honda	Kao Miura	Sena Miyake	
Kazakhstan	Oleg Melnikov	Artur Smagulov	Nikita Krivosheyev	
Poland	Kornel Witkowski	Mikhail Mogilen	Egor Khlopkov	
Russia	Evgeni Semenenko	Alexander Golubev	Egor Rukhin	
South Africa	Nicolas van de Vijver	—N/a		
South Korea	Lee Jun-hyuk	Park Hyeon-seo	Kim Ye-sung	
Spain	Iker Oyarzabal Albas	Euken Alberdi	Miguel Martos	
Turkey	Ali Efe Güneş	Alp Töre Ovalioğlu	—N/a	
Ukraine	Kyrylo Lishenko	Fedir Kulish	Andriy Kokura	
United States	Eric Prober	Joseph Klein	Samuel Mindra	

=== Junior ladies ===
Junior ladies
Nation	Gold	Silver	Bronze	Refs
Austria	Dorotea Leitgeb	Jasmine Elsebaie	Lina Salzer	
Belarus	Varvara Kisel	Milana Ramashova	Kseniya Zhehulskaya	
Chinese Taipei	Ting Tzu-Han	Chelpin Chen	Lin Yan-Yi	
Hong Kong	Megan Wong	Tsz Ching Chan	Chloe Desiree Leung	
Hungary	Bernadett Szigeti	Regina Schermann	Katinka Zsembery	
Iceland	Júlía Rós Viðarsdóttir	Júlía Sylvía Gunnarsdóttir	Eydís Gunnarsdóttir	
Italy	Anna Pezzetta	Clara Zadra	Camilla Paola Gardini	
Japan	Rino Matsuike	Hana Yoshida	Mao Shimada	
Kazakhstan	Anna Levkovets	Sabina Nassyrova	Sofia Farafonova	
Lithuania	Jogailė Aglinskytė	Marija Brejeva	Darja Reginevic	
New Zealand	Dani Gebser	Mirika Armstrong	Ella Smith	
Norway	Linnea Sophie Kolstad Kilsand	Mia Caroline Risa Gomez	Ida Eline Vamnes	
Poland	Ekaterina Kurakova	Karolina Białas	Natalia Lerka	
Russia	Sofia Akatyeva	Adeliya Petrosyan	Sofia Muravieva	
Serbia	Danica Đorđević	Darja Mijatović	Ivona Kleut	
South Africa	Gian-Quen Isaacs	Keva Emond	Megan Timmerman	
South Korea	Shin Ji-a	Han Hee-sue	Song Si-woo	
Spain	Nuria Rodríguez	Celia Vandhana	Alba Patiño	
Turkey	Ceren Karaş	Elifsu Erol	Fatma Yade Karlıklı	
Ukraine	Kateryna Kononenko	Mariia Andriichuk	Taisiya Spesivtseva	
United States	Isabeau Levito	Kanon Smith	Clare Seo	

=== Junior pairs ===
Pairs
Nation	Gold	Silver	Bronze	Refs
Czech Republic	Barbora Kuciánová / Lukáš Vochozka	—N/a		
Germany	Letizia Roscher / Luis Schuster	—N/a		
Italy	Alyssa Chiara Mountain / Manuel Piazza	Anna Valesi / Filippo Giacomo Clerici	Federica Simioli / Alessandro Zarbo	
Russia	Iuliia Artemeva / Mikhail Nazarychev	Kseniia Akhanteva / Valerii Kolesov	Anastasia Mukhortova / Dmitry Yevgenyev	
Slovakia	Margaréta Mušková / Oliver Kubacak	—N/a		
Ukraine	Violetta Sierova / Ivan Khobta	—N/a		
United States	Anastasiia Smirnova / Danil Siianytsia	Isabelle Martins / Ryan Bedard	Valentina Plazas / Maximiliano Fernandez	

=== Junior ice dance ===
Junior ice dance
Nation	Gold	Silver	Bronze	Refs
Austria	Corinna Huber / Patrik Huber	—N/a		
Belarus	Elizaveta Novik / Oleksandr Kukharevskyi	Snezhana Barmotina / Svyatoslav Verstakov	Natallia Pazhyvilka / Ilya Drantusau	
Czech Republic	Denisa Cimlová / Vilém Hlavsa	Adéla Pejchová / Filip Mencl	Barbora Zelená / Jáchym Novák	
France	Marie Dupayage / Thomas Nabais	Loïcia Demougeot / Théo Le Mercier	Lou Terreaux/ Noé Perron	
Germany	Anne-Marie Wolf / Max Liebers	Lilia Charlene Schubert / Kieren Wagner	—N/a	
Hungary	Katica Kedves / Fedor Sharonov	Petra Csikós / Patrik Csikós	—N/a	
Italy	Carolina Portesi Peroni / Michael Chrastecky	Nicole Calderari / Marco Cilli	Noemi Tali / Stefano Frasca	
Japan	Utana Yoshida / Shingo Nishiyama	Ayano Sasaki / Atsuhiko Tamura	Kaho Yamashita / Yuto Nagata	
Poland	Olivia Oliver / Joshua Andari	Arina Klimova / Filip Bojanowski	Sofiia Dovhal / Wiktor Kulesza	
Russia	Arina Ushakova / Maxim Nekrasov	Elizaveta Shanaeva / Devid Naryzhnyy	Irina Khavronina / Dario Cirisano	
Spain	Erika Riera Martínez / Raman Balanovich	Martina Rossi / Adriano Rossi	Maria Pinto / Raul Bermejo	
Ukraine	Mariia Pinchuk / Mykyta Pogorielov	Lika Bondar / Artem Koval	Miroslava Tkachenko / Andriy Kapran	
United States	Katarina Wolfkostin / Jeffrey Chen	Oona Brown / Gage Brown	Katarina DelCamp / Ian Somerville	
