= 2021 Internationaux de France =

5th event in the 2021-2022 ISU Grand Prix of Figure Skating

- Type: Grand Prix
- Date: November 19 – 21
- Season: 2021–22
- Location: Grenoble, France
- Host: French Federation of Ice Sports
- Venue: Patinoire Polesud

Champions
- Men's singles: (Japan) Yuma Kagiyama
- Women's singles: (Russia) Anna Shcherbakova
- Pairs: (Russia) Aleksandra Boikova & Dmitrii Kozlovskii
- Ice dance: (France) Gabriella Papadakis & Guillaume Cizeron
- Previous: 2019 Internationaux de France
- Next: 2022 Grand Prix de France
- Previous Grand Prix: 2021 NHK Trophy
- Next Grand Prix: 2021 Rostelecom Cup

The 2021 Internationaux de France was the fifth event in the 2021–22 ISU Grand Prix of Figure Skating, a senior-level international invitational competition series. It was held at the Patinoire Polesud in Grenoble on November 19–21. Medals were awarded in the disciplines of men's singles, women's singles, pair skating, and ice dance. Skaters earned points toward qualifying for the 2021–22 Grand Prix Final.

== Changes to preliminary assignments ==
The International Skating Union announced the preliminary assignments on June 29, 2021.

Discipline	Withdrew		Added		Notes	Ref.
Discipline	Date	Skater(s)	Date	Skater(s)	Notes	Ref.
Men	—N/a		September 16	(France); Romain Ponsart	Host picks	
Pairs	—N/a		September 16	(France); Coline Keriven; Noël-Antoine Pierre	Host picks	
Ice dance	—N/a		September 16	(France); Evgeniia Lopareva; Geoffrey Brissaud	Host picks	
Pairs	October 18	(France); Cléo Hamon; Denys Strekalin	October 18	(France); Camille Kovalev; Pavel Kovalev	Hamon & Strekalin split.	
Pairs	October 19	(China); Peng Cheng; Jin Yang	October 21	(Hungary); Ioulia Chtchetinina; Márk Magyar		
Pairs	October 19	(China); Wang Yuchen; Huang Yihang	October 21	(Italy); Rebecca Ghilardi; Filippo Ambrosini		
Ice dance	November 2	(France); Adelina Galyavieva; Louis Thauron	November 3	(France); Loïcia Demougeot; Théo le Mercier	Galyavieva & Thauron split.	
Ice dance	November 2	(Russia); Tiffany Zahorski; Jonathan Guerreiro	November 8	(Finland); Juulia Turkkila; Matthias Versluis	Hospitalization (Zahorski)	
Women	November 3	(France); Maé-Bérénice Méité	November 8	(Japan); Yuhana Yokoi	Injury recovery	
Women	November 8	(France); Maïa Mazzara	November 8	(South Korea); Park Yeon-jeong		

== Judging ==
For the 2021–2022 season, all of the technical elements in any figure skating performance – such as jumps, spins, and lifts – were assigned a predetermined base point value and were then scored by a panel of nine judges on a scale from -5 to 5 based on their quality of execution. The judging panel's Grade of Execution (GOE) was determined by calculating the trimmed mean (that is, an average after deleting the highest and lowest scores), and this GOE was added to the base value to come up with the final score for each element. The panel's scores for all elements were added together to generate a total element score. At the same time, judges evaluated each performance based on five program components – skating skills, transitions, performance, composition, and interpretation of the music – and assigned a score from .25 to 10 in .25 point increments. The judging panel's final score for each program component was also determined by calculating the trimmed mean. Those scores were then multiplied by the factor shown on the following chart; the results were added together to generate a total program component score.

Program component factoring
Discipline	Short program or Rhythm dance	Free skate or Free dance
Men	1.00	2.00
Women	0.80	1.60
Pairs	0.80	1.60
Ice dance	0.80	1.20

Deductions were applied for certain violations like time infractions, stops and restarts, or falls. The total element score and total program component score were added together, minus any deductions, to generate a final performance score for each skater or team.

== Results ==
=== Men ===
Rank	Name	Nation	Total points	SP		FS	
1	Yuma Kagiyama	Japan	286.41	1	100.64	1	185.77
2	Shun Sato	Japan	264.99	4	87.82	3	177.17
3	Jason Brown	United States	264.20	3	89.39	4	174.81
4	Deniss Vasiljevs	Latvia	254.48	2	89.76	7	164.72
5	Dmitri Aliev	Russia	253.56	5	85.05	5	168.51
6	Keegan Messing	Canada	253.06	6	85.03	6	168.03
7	Andrei Mozalev	Russia	248.54	9	68.77	2	179.77
8	Adam Siao Him Fa	France	243.29	7	84.47	9	158.82
9	Kévin Aymoz	France	228.08	12	63.98	8	164.10
10	Artur Danielian	Russia	221.50	8	76.81	11	144.69
11	Romain Ponsart	France	212.27	10	66.38	10	145.89
12	Gabriele Frangipani	Italy	184.27	11	66.33	12	117.94

=== Women ===
Rank	Name	Nation	Total points	SP		FS	
1	Anna Shcherbakova	Russia	229.69	1	77.94	1	151.75
2	Alena Kostornaia	Russia	221.85	2	76.44	2	145.41
3	Wakaba Higuchi	Japan	204.91	6	63.87	3	141.04
4	Kseniia Sinitsyna	Russia	198.76	3	69.89	6	128.87
5	Karen Chen	United States	194.00	5	64.67	5	129.33
6	Mariah Bell	United States	190.79	10	60.81	4	129.98
7	Ekaterina Ryabova	Azerbaijan	186.65	7	63.34	8	123.31
8	Park Yeon-jeong	South Korea	186.11	4	67.00	9	119.11
9	Yuhana Yokoi	Japan	176.93	11	52.32	7	124.61
10	Lee Hae-in	South Korea	171.32	8	63.18	10	108.14
11	Léa Serna	France	170.33	9	62.75	11	107.58

=== Pairs ===
Rank	Name	Nation	Total points	SP		FS	
1	Aleksandra Boikova / Dmitrii Kozlovskii	Russia	216.96	1	77.17	1	139.79
2	Iuliia Artemeva / Mikhail Nazarychev	Russia	205.15	2	73.02	2	132.13
3	Alexa Knierim / Brandon Frazier	United States	201.69	4	70.15	3	131.54
4	Vanessa James / Eric Radford	Canada	196.34	3	71.84	4	124.50
5	Rebecca Ghilardi / Filippo Ambrosini	Italy	176.19	5	64.60	5	111.59
6	Ioulia Chtchetinina / Márk Magyar	Hungary	152.76	7	52.26	6	100.50
7	Camille Kovalev / Pavel Kovalev	France	151.98	6	55.25	8	96.73
8	Coline Keriven / Noël-Antoine Pierre	France	149.48	8	51.93	7	97.55

=== Ice dance ===
Rank	Name	Nation	Total points	RD		FD	
1	Gabriella Papadakis / Guillaume Cizeron	France	221.25	1	89.08	1	132.17
2	Piper Gilles / Paul Poirier	Canada	203.16	2	81.35	2	121.81
3	Alexandra Stepanova / Ivan Bukin	Russia	200.29	3	79.89	3	120.40
4	Evgeniia Lopareva / Geoffrey Brissaud	France	175.94	5	69.23	4	106.71
5	Christina Carreira / Anthony Ponomarenko	United States	175.91	4	70.74	7	105.17
6	Annabelle Morozov / Andrei Bagin	Russia	172.32	6	68.45	8	103.87
7	Juulia Turkkila / Matthias Versluis	Finland	171.02	7	64.62	5	106.40
8	Allison Reed / Saulius Ambrulevičius	Lithuania	169.83	8	64.43	6	105.40
9	Loïcia Demougeot / Théo Le Mercier	France	156.61	9	63.95	10	92.66
10	Jennifer Janse van Rensburg / Benjamin Steffan	Germany	154.09	10	57.14	9	96.95

== Works cited ==
- "Special Regulations & Technical Rules – Single & Pair Skating and Ice Dance 2021". International Skating Union. Archived from the original on April 4, 2022.
