= 2021 French Figure Skating Championships =

Figure skating competition

- Type: National championship
- Date: 5–6 February 2021 (S); 3–5 April 2021 (J)
- Season: 2020–21
- Location: Vaujany, Isère (S); Villard-de-Lans, Isère (J)
- Host: Fédération Française des Sports de Glace
- Venue: Patinoire de Vaujany (S); Patinoire Municipale (J)

Champions
- Men's singles: Kévin Aymoz (S)
- Ladies' singles: Léa Serna (S)
- Pairs: Cléo Hamon / Denys Strekalin (S)
- Ice dance: Adelina Galyavieva / Louis Thauron (S); Marie Dupayage / Thomas Nabais (J)
- Previous: 2020 French Championships
- Next: 2022 French Championships

The 2021 French Figure Skating Championships were held in Vaujany from 5 to 6 February 2021. Medals were awarded in the disciplines of men's singles, ladies' singles, and ice dance. The results were part of the French selection criteria for the 2021 World Championships.

== Impact of the COVID-19 pandemic ==
The French Championships were originally scheduled for 17 to 20 December 2020 in Vaujany, alongside the Christmas Gala on 22 December. On 10 November, Fédération Française des Sports de Glace (FFSG) president Nathalie Péchalat expressed in an interview that she hoped to hold the event, despite the ongoing health crisis. One week later, on 16 November, the FFSG announced the cancellation of both the senior Championships and the Christmas Gala. The FFSG had already cancelled its Grand Prix event, the 2020 Internationaux de France, earlier in the season.

Prior to the cancellation announcement, reigning ice dance champions Gabriella Papadakis / Guillaume Cizeron had already announced that they would be skipping the event. The couple explained their desire to focus on the 2021 World Championship (which they later decided to also skip) and concerns about being stranded in Europe or separated, due to Papadakis having a different visa for their Canadian training base from Cizeron that made it more difficult for her to travel internationally.

On 12 January 2021, the FFSG announced the reinstatement of the French Championships after rescheduling the event to 5–6 February, still to be hosted in Vaujany.

== Medal summary ==
=== Senior ===
Discipline	Gold	Silver	Bronze
Men	Kévin Aymoz	Adam Siao Him Fa	Romain Ponsart
Ladies	Léa Serna	Maïa Mazzara	Lola Ghozali
Pairs	Cléo Hamon / Denys Strekalin	Coline Keriven / Noël-Antoine Pierre	No other competitors
Ice dance	Adelina Galyavieva / Louis Thauron	Evgeniia Lopareva / Geoffrey Brissaud	No other competitors

=== Junior ===
Discipline	Gold	Silver	Bronze
Ice dance	Marie Dupayage / Thomas Nabais	Loïcia Demougeot / Théo Le Mercier	Lou Terreaux / Noé Perron

== Results ==
=== Men ===
Rank	Name	Total	SP		FS	
1	Kévin Aymoz	284.50	1	96.01	1	188.49
2	Adam Siao Him Fa	244.15	2	78.50	2	165.65
3	Romain Ponsart	209.07	3	76.91	3	132.16
4	(Monaco) Davide Lewton Brain	177.64	4	64.15	4	113.49
5	François Pitot	142.29	5	60.22	5	82.07

=== Ladies ===
Rank	Name	Total	SP		FS	
1	Léa Serna	170.06	1	63.54	1	106.52
2	Maïa Mazzara	163.77	2	60.96	2	102.81
3	Lola Ghozali	156.42	4	54.39	3	102.03
4	Lorine Schild	150.93	3	57.11	4	93.82
5	Sophie Sprung	128.44	6	45.44	5	83.00
6	Eva Dubecq	125.84	5	51.07	6	74.77

=== Pairs ===
Rank	Name	Total	SP		FS	
1	Cléo Hamon / Denys Strekalin	172.55	1	60.35	1	112.20
2	Coline Keriven / Noël-Antoine Pierre	149.72	2	55.92	2	93.80

=== Ice dance ===
Rank	Name	Total	RD		FD	
1	Adelina Galyavieva / Louis Thauron	194.28	1	77.90	1	116.38
2	Evgeniia Lopareva / Geoffrey Brissaud	189.54	2	75.42	2	114.12

== Junior Championships ==
The French Junior Championships were originally scheduled to be held on 5 to 7 February 2021 in Belfort, before being rescheduled to 3 to 4 April in Villard-de-Lans. Only an ice dance competition was held.

=== Results ===
==== Junior ice dance ====
Rank	Name	Total	RD		FD	
1	Marie Dupayage / Thomas Nabais	163.53	2	63.04	1	100.49
2	Loïcia Demougeot / Théo Le Mercier	160.93	1	68.14	2	92.79
3	Lou Terreaux / Noé Perron	149.00	3	59.68	3	89.32
4	Celina Fradji / Jean-Hans Fourneaux	128.95	5	48.51	4	80.44
5	Eva Bernard / Tom Jochum	121.04	6	46.76	5	74.28
6	Louise Bordet / Thomas Gipoulou	118.77	4	48.82	6	69.95
7	Ninon Terreaux / Alexey Tameev	99.10	7	39.07	7	60.03

== International team selections ==
=== World Championships ===
The 2021 World Championships will be held in Stockholm, Sweden from 22 to 28 March 2021. FFSG named the team on 1 March 2021.

	Men	Ladies	Pairs	Ice dance
1	Kévin Aymoz	Maé-Bérénice Méité	Cléo Hamon / Denys Strekalin	Adelina Galyavieva / Louis Thauron
2			Coline Keriven / Noël-Antoine Pierre	Evgeniia Lopareva / Geoffrey Brissaud
Alt.	Adam Siao Him Fa	Maïa Mazzara		Marie-Jade Lauriault / Romain Le Gac

=== European Championships ===
The 2021 European Championships, scheduled to be held in Zagreb, Croatia from 25 to 31 January 2021, were cancelled on 10 December 2020.

=== World Junior Championships ===
Commonly referred to as "Junior Worlds", the 2021 World Junior Championships, scheduled to take place in Harbin, China from 1 to 7 March 2021, were cancelled on 24 November 2020.
