= Cléo Hamon =

French pair skater (born 2001)

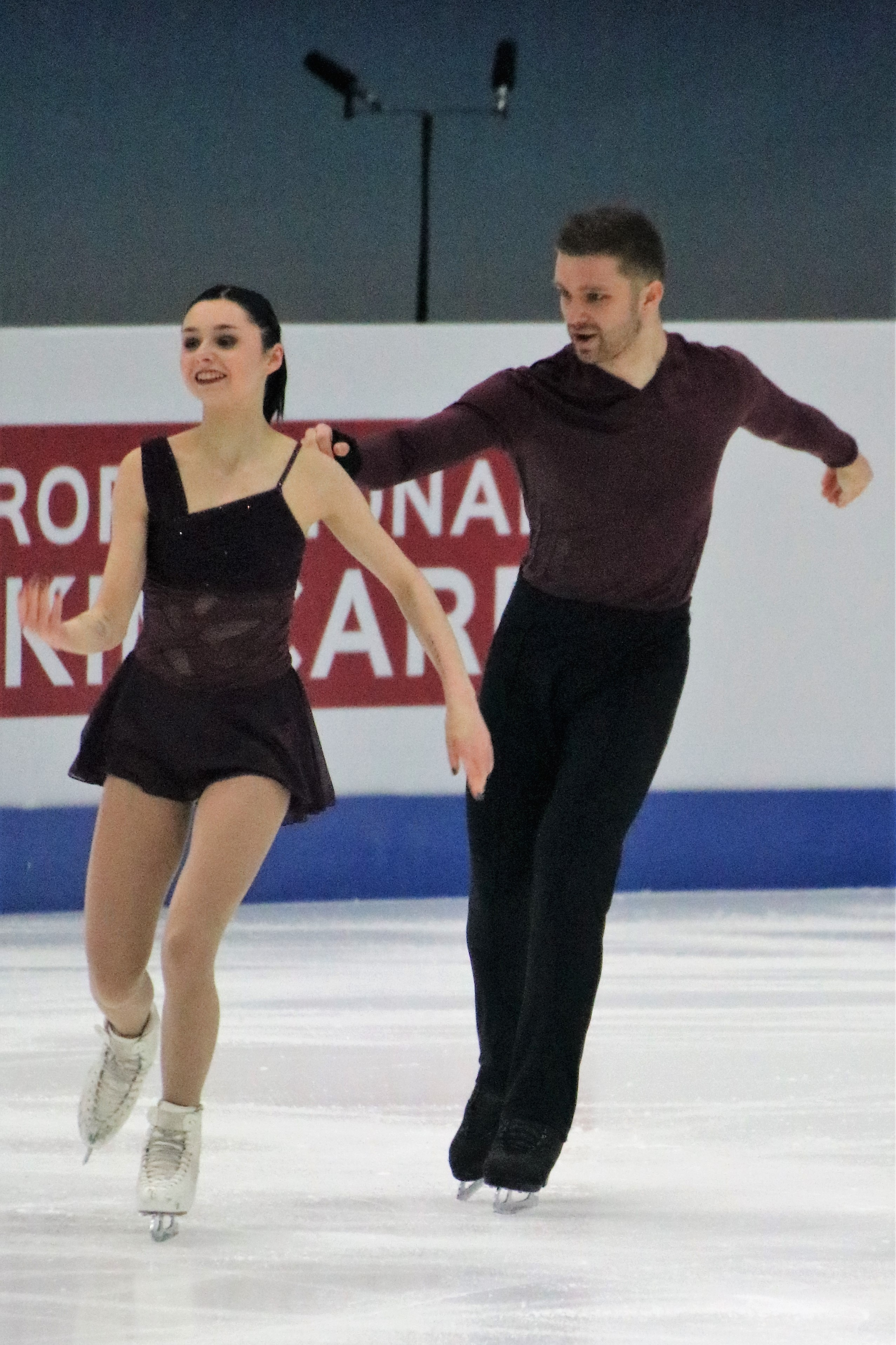
- Cléo Hamon and Denys Strekalin at the 2020 European Championships

Personal information
- Born: 25 November 2001 (age 24) Cormeilles-en-Parisis, France
- Home town: Montlignon, France
- Height: 1.63 m (5 ft 4 in)

Figure skating career
- Country: France
- Discipline: Pair skating (since 2016); Women's singles (2016–17)
- Partner: Denys Strekalin (2016–22)
- Coach: Claude Thévenard
- Skating club: Club Olympique de Courbevoie
- Began skating: 2006

Medal record
French Championships
Gold medal – first place	2020 Dunkirk	Pairs
Gold medal – first place	2021 Vaujany	Pairs
Silver medal – second place	2018 Nantes	Pairs
Silver medal – second place	2019 Vaujany	Pairs

Cléo Hamon (born 25 November 2001) is a French pair skater. With her former skating partner, Denys Strekalin, she is a two-time French national champion (2020, 2021), 2018 Volvo Open Cup champion, and has competed in the final segment at three World Junior Championships (2017–2019).

== Personal life ==
Cléo Hamon was born on 25 November 2001 in Cormeilles-en-Parisis, France. Her brother, Axel, is a triathlete.

== Career ==
=== Single skating ===
Hamon began learning to skate in 2006. Competing in ladies' singles, she won silver in the advanced novice category at the Rooster Cup in April 2016. She appeared once on the junior level, placing 13th at the Golden Bear of Zagreb in October 2016.

=== Early partnerships ===
In the 2014–2015 season, Hamon competed in partnership with Xavier Vauclin. The two became the French national novice champions in March 2015.

Hamon also skated with Brice Panizzi.

=== Partnership with Strekalin ===
==== Early seasons ====
In August 2016, Hamon teamed up with Ukraine's Denys Strekalin to compete for France in pairs. Coached by Mehdi Bouzzine in Courbevoie, they made their international debut in February 2017, placing seventh in junior pairs at the Bavarian Open. In March, they placed fourteenth at the 2017 World Junior Championships in Taipei, Taiwan.

In September 2017, Hamon/Strekalin debuted on the ISU Junior Grand Prix (JGP) series, placing eighth in Riga, Latvia. In December, appearing on the senior level, they won silver at the French Championships, behind Lola Esbrat / Andrei Novoselov. In March, they finished eleventh at the 2018 World Junior Championships in Sofia, Bulgaria.

Competing in the 2018 JGP series, Hamon/Strekalin placed sixth in Linz, Austria, and fifth in Ostrava, Czech Republic. Making their senior international debut, the pair took gold at the Volvo Open Cup in November 2018. In March 2019, they finished ninth at the 2019 World Junior Championships in Zagreb, Croatia.

==== 2019–20 season ====
After placing eighth at the 2019 JGP United States, Hamon/Strekalin debuted on the senior Challenger series with a seventh-place finish at the 2019 CS Finlandia Trophy. They would go on to place tenth at the 2019 CS Warsaw Cup, and ninth at their first European Championships. Hamon/Strekalin also won the French senior national title for the first time, due to the absence of James/Cipres from the competition season. They finished the season at the 2020 World Junior Championships, where they placed fifth. Hamon/Strekalin were scheduled to participate in the 2020 World Championships in Montreal, which would have been their senior World debut, but these were canceled due to the COVID-19 pandemic.

==== 2020–21 season ====
With the pandemic ongoing, Hamon/Strekalin began the new season at the 2020 CS Nebelhorn Trophy, where only pairs training in Europe competed. They were fourth after the short program, and after the top-ranked Hase/Seegert withdrew, they placed third in the free and won the bronze medal.

Hamon/Strekalin were scheduled to make their Grand Prix debut at the 2020 Internationaux de France, but the event was cancelled due to the pandemic.

In February, they won their second straight National title. Later that month, they competed at the International Challenge Cup, placing fifth. On March 1, they were named to the team for the 2021 World Championships. They placed twentieth in their World Championship debut. Hamon/Strekalin finished the season at the 2021 World Team Trophy, where they finished fifth in both segments and Team France finished in fifth place overall.

==== 2021–22 season ====
Hamon/Strekalin began the season at the 2021 Lombardia Trophy, where they finished in fourth place.

They were originally scheduled to compete at the Nebelhorn Trophy, where the final Olympics spots would be decided, but were later replaced by Coline Keriven / Noël-Antoine Pierre. It was later announced that Hamon would be taking a break from figure skating, due to health issues from a burnout, and that had been the reason for them being replaced at the Nebelhorn Trophy. The team later split, and Strekalin began looking for a new partner in October.

== Programs ==
(with Strekalin)

Season	Short program	Free skating
2021–2022	Kill of the Night by Gin Wigmore	Mais je t'aime by Grand Corps Malade, Camille Lellouche
2020–2021	Kill of the Night by Gin Wigmore	The Fifth Element; Diva Dance (from The Fifth Element) by Éric Serra
2019–2020	Bang Bang by Asaf Avidan choreo. by Leonie Corbin	Notre-Dame de Paris by Riccardo Cocciante, Luc Plamondon choreo. by Fabian Bourzat, Silvia Fontana
2018–2019	Bang Bang by Asaf Avidan choreo. by Leonie Corbin	Deep Shadow by T.T.L.; The Hunger Games: Mockingjay – Part 1; The Hanging Tree performed by L.E.J; The Mockingjay Theme choreo. by Leonie Corbin
2017–2018	I Want You Back performed by Tony Succar, Tito Nieves choreo. by Leonie Corbin	Deep Shadow by T.T.L.; The Hunger Games: Mockingjay – Part 1; The Hanging Tree performed by L.E.J; The Mockingjay Theme choreo. by Leonie Corbin
2016–2017	I Want You Back performed by Tony Succar, Tito Nieves choreo. by Leonie Corbin	Interstellar by Hans Zimmer choreo. by Leonie Corbin

== Competitive highlights ==
GP: Grand Prix. CS: Challenger Series; JGP: Junior Grand Prix

=== Pairs with Strekalin ===
International
Event	16–17	17–18	18–19	19–20	20–21	21–22
Worlds				C	20th	
Europeans				9th		
GP France					C	WD
CS Finlandia Trophy				7th		
CS Lombardia Trophy						4th
CS Nebelhorn Trophy					3rd	WD
CS Warsaw Cup				10th		
Challenge Cup					WD	
Volvo Open Cup			1st			
International: Junior
Junior Worlds	14th	11th	9th	5th		
JGP Austria			6th			
JGP Czech Rep.			5th			
JGP Latvia		8th				
JGP Poland		15th				
JGP United States				8th		
Bavarian Open	7th					
Tallinn Trophy		2nd				
National
French Champ.		2nd	2nd	1st	1st	
French Junior	1st	1st	1st	1st		
Masters		1st J			1st	
Team events
World Team Trophy					5th T 5th P	

=== Ladies' singles ===
International
Event	16–17
Golden Bear of Zagreb	13th J
