= Denys Strekalin =

Ukrainian-French pair skater (born 1999)

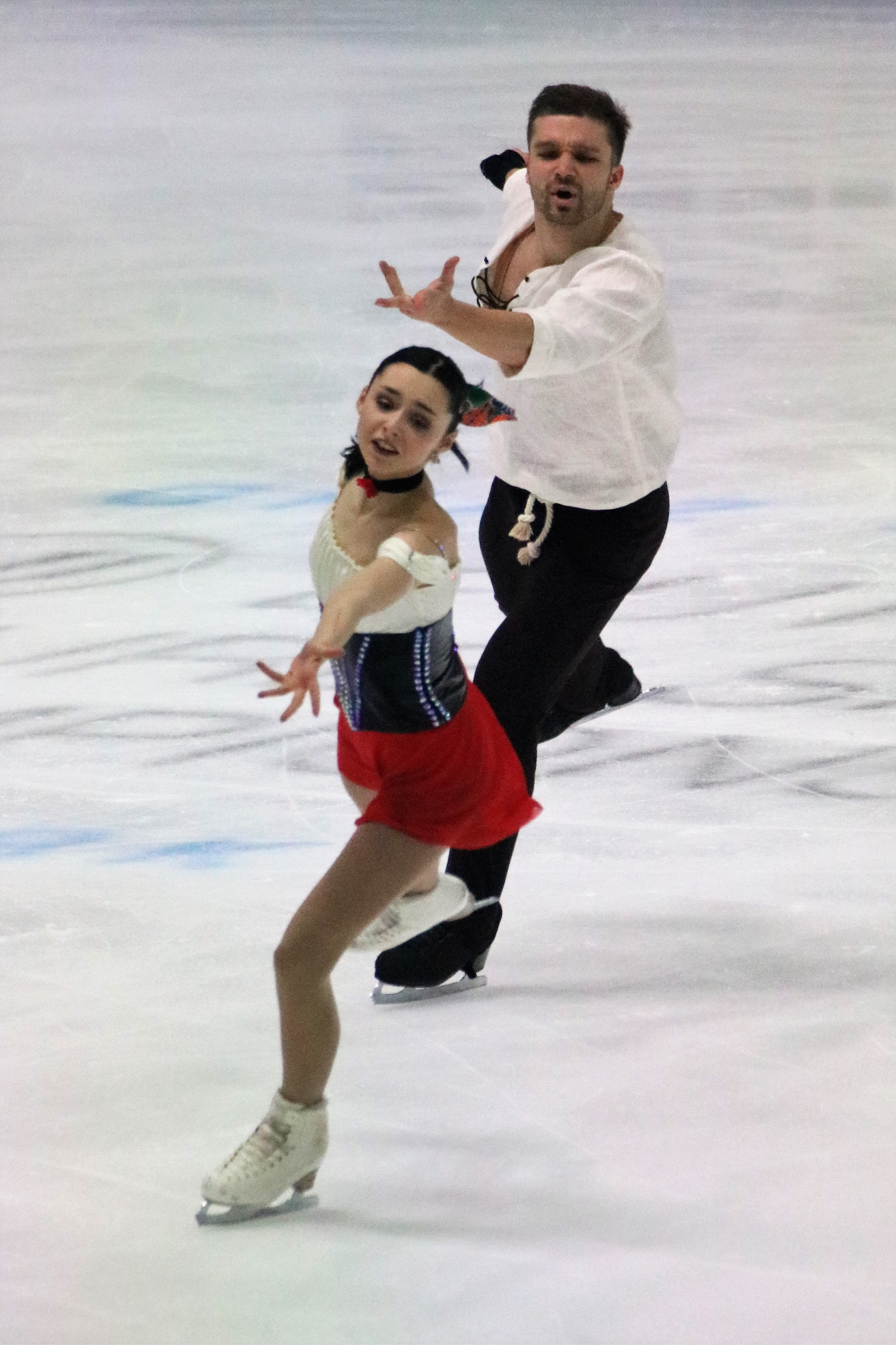
- Cléo Hamon and Denys Strekalin at the 2020 European Championships

Personal information
- Native name: Денис Стрекалін
- Born: 31 March 1999 (age 27) Simferopol, AR Crimea, Ukraine
- Home town: Paris, France
- Height: 1.74 m (5 ft 8 1/2 in)

Figure skating career
- Country: France (since 2016); Ukraine (2012–15)
- Discipline: Pair skating (since 2016); Men's singles (2012–15)
- Partner: Megan Wessenberg (since 2025); Océane Piegad (2022–24); Cléo Hamon (2016–22)
- Coach: Bruno Massot; Stefania Berton; Rockne Brubaker
- Skating club: Club Olympique Courbevoie
- Began skating: 2005

Medal record
Representing France
French Championships
| Gold medal – first place | 2020 Dunkirk | Pairs |
| Gold medal – first place | 2021 Vaujany | Pairs |
| Silver medal – second place | 2018 Nantes | Pairs |
| Silver medal – second place | 2019 Vaujany | Pairs |
| Silver medal – second place | 2024 Vaujany | Pairs |

Denys Strekalin (Ukrainian: Денис Стрекалін; born 31 March 1999) is a Ukrainian-born pair skater who competes for France with Megan Wessenberg.

With previous partner, Océane Piegad, he is the 2024 French national silver medalist.

With former skating partner, Cléo Hamon, he is a two-time French national champion (2020, 2021), 2018 Volvo Open Cup champion, and has competed in the final segment at three World Junior Championships (2017–2019).

== Personal life ==
Strekalin was born on 31 March 1999 in Simferopol, AR Crimea, Ukraine.

== Career ==
=== In Ukraine ===
Strekalin began learning to skate in 2006. Competing in men's singles, he placed seventh at the Ukrainian Junior Championships in 2013 and 2015. He also trained in pair skating with Sofiia Nesterova.

=== Partnership with Hamon ===
==== Early seasons ====
In August 2016, Strekhalin teamed up with Cleo Hamon to compete for France in pairs. Coached by Mehdi Bouzzine in Courbevoie, they made their international debut in February 2017, placing seventh in junior pairs at the Bavarian Open. In March, they placed fourteenth at the 2017 World Junior Championships in Taipei, Taiwan.

In September 2017, Hamon/Strekalin debuted on the ISU Junior Grand Prix (JGP) series, placing eighth in Riga, Latvia. In December, appearing on the senior level, they won silver at the French Championships, behind Lola Esbrat / Andrei Novoselov. In March, they finished eleventh at the 2018 World Junior Championships in Sofia, Bulgaria.

Competing in the 2018 JGP series, Hamon/Strekalin placed sixth in Linz, Austria, and fifth in Ostrava, Czech Republic. Making their senior international debut, the pair took gold at the Volvo Open Cup in November 2018. In March 2019, they finished ninth at the 2019 World Junior Championships in Zagreb, Croatia.

==== 2019–20 season: French national champion, European Championships debut ====
After placing eighth at the 2019 JGP United States, Hamon/Streklain debuted on the senior Challenger series with a seventh-place finish at the 2019 CS Finlandia Trophy. They would go on to place tenth at the 2019 CS Warsaw Cup and ninth at their first European Championships. Hamon/Strekalin also won the French senior national title for the first time, due to the absence of James/Cipres from the competition season. They finished the season at the 2020 World Junior Championships, where they placed fifth. Hamon/Strekalin were scheduled to participate in the 2020 World Championships in Montreal, which would have been their senior World debut, but these were canceled due to the COVID-19 pandemic.

==== 2020–21 season: World Championships debut ====
With the pandemic ongoing, Hamon/Strekalin began the new season at the 2020 CS Nebelhorn Trophy, where only pairs training in Europe competed. They were fourth after the short program, and after the top-ranked Hase/Seegert withdrew, they placed third in the free and won the bronze medal.

Hamon/Strekalin were scheduled to make their Grand Prix debut at the 2020 Internationaux de France, but the event was cancelled due to the pandemic.

In February, they won their second straight National title. Later that month, they competed at the International Challenge Cup, placing fifth. On 1 March they were named to the team for the 2021 World Championships. They placed twentieth in their World Championship debut. Hamon/Strekalin finished the season at the 2021 World Team Trophy, where they finished fifth in both segments, and Team France finished in fifth place overall.

==== 2021–22 season: End of Hamon/Strekalin ====
Hamon/Strekalin began the season at the 2021 Lombardia Trophy, where they finished in fourth place.

They were originally scheduled to compete at the Nebelhorn Trophy, where the final Olympics spots would be decided, but were later replaced by Coline Keriven / Noël-Antoine Pierre. It was later announced that Hamon would be taking a break from figure skating due to health issues from burnout, and that had been the reason for them being replaced at the Nebelhorn Trophy.

=== Partnership with Piegad ===
==== 2022–23 season: Grand Prix debut ====
On 31 January 2022 Strekalin announced that he had formed a new partnership with former singles skater Océane Piegad. Coached by Laurent Depouilly, Nathalie Depouilly, and Dominique Deniaud, the pair made their competitive debut at the 2022 CS Nebelhorn Trophy, where they finished in eleventh place, and then competed at the 2022 Master's de Patinage, winning the silver medal.

Invited to make their Grand Prix debut at the 2022 Grand Prix de France, they finished seventh of seven teams at the event. They went on to place fourth at the 2022 Bavarian Open and seventh at the 2023 International Challenge Cup.

==== 2023–24 season ====
Piegad/Strekalin began the season with a tenth-place finish at the 2023 CS Lombardia Trophy, before coming seventh at the 2023 CS Finlandia Trophy. Appearing on the Grand Prix at the 2023 Grand Prix de France, they finished fifth.

==== 2024–25 season: End of Piegad/Strekalin ====
Piegad/Strekalin were assigned to the 2024 Grand Prix de France. They withdrew from the competition on September 17. On September 23, they announced their spilt due to injury.

=== Partnership with Wessenberg ===
==== 2025–26 season ====
In June 2025, it was Strekalin announced that he had teamed up with American-born figure skater, Megan Wessenberg, and they would split their time between training in France with Bruno Massot and the United States with Stefania Berton and Rockne Brubaker.

The team debuted at the 2025 Master's de Patinage, where they won the bronze medal. They then went on to compete at the 2025 CS Nebelhorn Trophy, finishing in seventeeth place. Subsequently debuting as a team on the Grand Prix circuit, they placed eighth overall at the 2025 Grand Prix de France.

In December, the team placed tenth at the Golden Spin of Zagreb. They would go onto place fourth at the 2026 French Championships.

==== 2026–27 season ====
The pair opened the new season by placing fifth at the 2026 John Nicks Challenge.

== Programs ==
=== With Wessenberg ===
| Season | Short program | Free skating | Exhibition |
|---|---|---|---|
| 2026–2027 | Cry Me a River by Tommee Profitt, Nicole Serrano, Justin Timberlake | "The Mask of Zorro" soundtrack: Collecting the Ballots; The Plaza of Execution; Zorro’s Theme; I Want to Spend My Lifetime Loving You by James Horner | Fake by Lola Young |
| 2025–2026 | Le dernier jour du disco by Juliette Armanet & Adrien Armanet choreo. by Rohene Ward, Pasquale Camerlengo | Lost Without You by Freya Ridings choreo. by Rohene Ward, Pasquale Camerlengo | Die with a Smile (Acoustic) by Lady Gaga & Bruno Mars |

=== With Piegad ===
| Season | Short program | Free skating |
|---|---|---|
| 2023–2024 | Le bal des fiancailles (Piano Trio No. 2) by Franz Schubert; Le cotege (Danse macabre) by Camille Saint-Saëns (from Les Noces de Feu) choreo. by Guillaume Cizeron | Silhouette by Aquilo; Nuvole Blanche by Ludovico Einaudi choreo. by Guillaume Cizeron |
| 2022–2023 | I Feel Like I'm Drowning by Two Feet choreo. by Pierre-Loup Bouquet, Brooke Appleyard | To Build a Home by The Cinematic Orchestra; Experience by Ludovico Einaudi choreo. by Pierre-Loup Bouquet, Brooke Appleyard |

=== With Hamon ===
| Season | Short program | Free skating |
|---|---|---|
| 2021–2022 | Kill of the Night by Gin Wigmore | Mais je t'aime by Grand Corps Malade, Camille Lellouche |
| 2020–2021 | Kill of the Night by Gin Wigmore | The Fifth Element; Diva Dance (from The Fifth Element) by Éric Serra |
| 2019–2020 | Bang Bang by Asaf Avidan choreo. by Leonie Corbin | Notre-Dame de Paris by Riccardo Cocciante, Luc Plamondon choreo. by Fabian Bourzat, Silvia Fontana |
| 2018–2019 | Bang Bang by Asaf Avidan choreo. by Leonie Corbin | Deep Shadow by T.T.L.; The Hunger Games: Mockingjay – Part 1; The Hanging Tree performed by L.E.J; The Mockingjay Theme choreo. by Leonie Corbin |
| 2017–2018 | I Want You Back performed by Tony Succar, Tito Nieves choreo. by Leonie Corbin | Deep Shadow by T.T.L.; The Hunger Games: Mockingjay – Part 1; The Hanging Tree performed by L.E.J; The Mockingjay Theme choreo. by Leonie Corbin |
| 2016–2017 | I Want You Back performed by Tony Succar, Tito Nieves choreo. by Leonie Corbin | Interstellar by Hans Zimmer choreo. by Leonie Corbin |

== Competitive highlights ==
- GP – Event of the ISU Grand Prix Series
- JGP – Event of the ISU Junior Grand Prix Series
- CS – Event of the ISU Challenger Series
- C – Cancelled
- TBD – Assigned
- WD – Withdrew from competition

=== Pairs with Wessenberg for France ===
Competition placements at senior level
| Season | 2025–26 | 2026–27 |
|---|---|---|
| French Championships | 4th | |
| GP France | 8th | 4th |
| GP Finlandia Trophy | | TBD |
| CS Nebelhorn Trophy | 17th | |
| CS John Nicks | | 5th |
| CS Golden Spin of Zagreb | 10th | |
| Bavarian Open | 1st | |
| Master's de Patinage | 3rd | |

=== Pairs with Piegad for France ===
International
| Event | 22–23 | 23–24 | 24-25 |
|---|---|---|---|
| Europeans | | 12th | |
| GP France | 7th | 5th | WD |
| CS Finlandia | | 7th | |
| CS Golden Spin | WD | | |
| CS Lombardia Trophy | | 10th | |
| CS Nebelhorn Trophy | 11th | | |
| CS Warsaw Cup | WD | | |
| Bavarian Open | 4th | | |
| Challenge Cup | 7th | | |
| Trophée Nice | | 2nd | |
National
| French Nationals | | 2nd | |
| Master's de Patinage | 2nd | WD | |
TBD = Assigned

=== Pairs with Hamon for France ===
International
| Event | 16–17 | 17–18 | 18–19 | 19–20 | 20–21 | 21–22 |
|---|---|---|---|---|---|---|
| Worlds | | | | C | 20th | |
| Europeans | | | | 9th | | |
| GP France | | | | | C | WD |
| CS Finlandia Trophy | | | | 7th | | |
| CS Lombardia Trophy | | | | | | 4th |
| CS Nebelhorn Trophy | | | | | 3rd | WD |
| CS Warsaw Cup | | | | 10th | | |
| Challenge Cup | | | | | WD | |
| Volvo Open Cup | | | 1st | | | |
International: Junior
| Junior Worlds | 14th | 11th | 9th | 5th | | |
| JGP Austria | | | 6th | | | |
| JGP Czech Rep. | | | 5th | | | |
| JGP Latvia | | 8th | | | | |
| JGP Poland | | 15th | | | | |
| JGP United States | | | | 8th | | |
| Bavarian Open | 7th | | | | | |
| Tallinn Trophy | | 2nd | | | | |
National
| French Champ. | | 2nd | 2nd | 1st | 1st | |
| French Junior | 1st | 1st | 1st | 1st | | |
| Masters | | 1st J | | | 1st | |
Team events
| World Team Trophy | | | | | 5th T 5th P | |
TBD = Assigned; WD = Withdrew; C = Event cancelled T = Team result; P = Personal result. Medals awarded for team result only.

=== Men's singles for Ukraine ===
National
| Event | 2012–13 | 2014–15 |
|---|---|---|
| Ukrainian Junior Champ. | 7th | 7th |
