= Evgeniia Lopareva =

Russian-French ice dancer (born 2000)

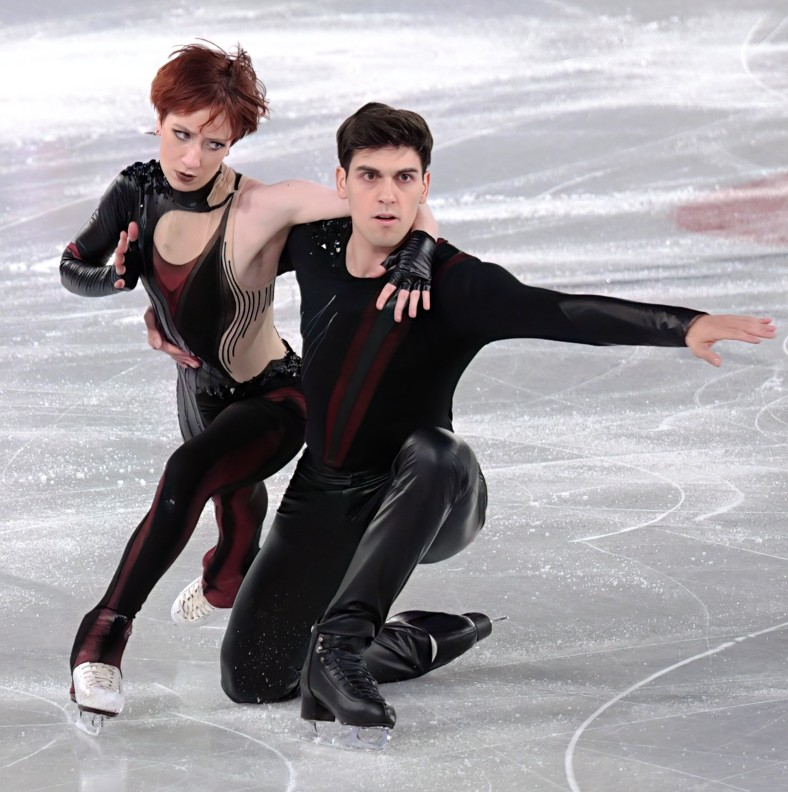
- Evgeniia Lopareva and Geoffrey Brissaud at the 2024–25 Grand Prix Final

Personal information
- Native name: Евгения Александровна Лопарёва
- Full name: Evgeniia Aleksandrovna Lopareva
- Other names: Evgeniia Lopareva
- Born: May 30, 2000 (age 26) Moscow, Russia
- Height: 1.61 m (5 ft 3 in)

Figure skating career
- Country: France (since 2018); Russia (2014–18)
- Discipline: Ice dance
- Partner: Geoffrey Brissaud (since 2018); Alexei Karpushov (2014–18)
- Coach: Romain Haguenauer; Marie-France Dubreuil; Patrice Lauzon; Pascal Denis
- Skating club: Lyon Glace Patinage
- Began skating: 2004

Medal record
Representing France
European Championships
Silver medal – second place	2025 Tallinn	Ice dance
French Championships
Gold medal – first place	2023 Rouen	Ice dance
Gold medal – first place	2024 Vaujany	Ice dance
Gold medal – first place	2025 Annecy	Ice dance
Silver medal – second place	2021 Vaujany	Ice dance
Silver medal – second place	2022 Cergy-Pontoise	Ice dance
Silver medal – second place	2026 Briancon	Ice dance
Bronze medal – third place	2020 Dunkirk	Ice dance

Evgeniia Aleksandrovna Lopareva (Russian: Евгения Александровна Лопарёва, born May 30, 2000) is a Russian-French ice dancer who competes for France. With her partner, Geoffrey Brissaud, she is the 2025 European silver medalist, a three-time French national champion (2023-25), an eight-time Grand Prix medalist, and a seven-time ISU Challenger Series medalist (including four gold). Lopareva and Brissaud represented France at the 2026 Winter Olympics.

At the junior level, they finished in the top ten at the 2019 World Junior Championships and are the 2019 French junior national silver medalists.

== Personal life ==
Lopareva was born on May 30, 2000, in Moscow, Russia. She received her French citizenship in May 2022.

== Career ==
=== Early years ===
Lopareva began learning how to skate as a four-year-old in 2004. She competed with her first partner, Alexey Karpushov, for five seasons. The two debuted on the ISU Junior Grand Prix (JGP) series in September 2016, placing fourth in Ostrava, Czech Republic. They had the same overall result at 2018 JGP Austria but did not compete again for the rest of the season. The team ended their partnership before the start of the 2018–19 figure skating season.

=== Partnership with Brissaud ===
==== 2018–19 season: Debut of Lopareva/Brissaud ====
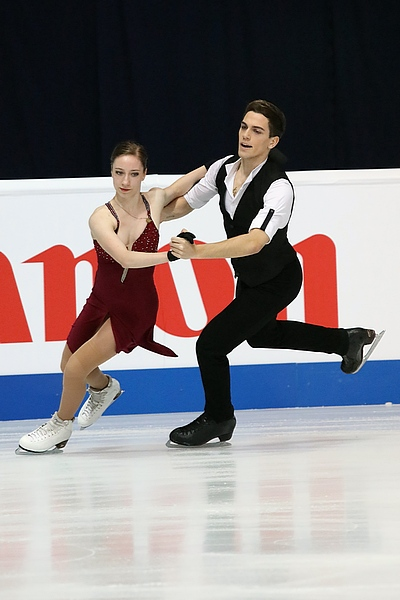
Lopareva/Brissaud at the 2019 World Junior Championships

Before the start of the 2018–19 season, Lopareva teamed up with French ice dancer, Geoffrey Brissaud, to compete for France. It was subsequently announced that they would be coached by Ekaterina Rubleva in Moscow, Russia. The new team debuted on the junior level at the 2018 Master's de Patinage, where they won the silver medal. They were subsequently assigned to two international assignments – the 2019 Egna Dance Trophy, where they took silver in the junior division, and the 2019 World Junior Championships, where they placed tenth. Between the two events, they also won the silver medal at the 2019 French Junior Championships.

==== 2019–20 season: Senior international debut ====
Lopareva/Brissaud made their senior international debut in September at their first assignment of the 2019–20 season, the 2019 CS Nepela Memorial Trophy. Here, the team placed eighth in the rhythm dance but made a comeback in the free dance (fourth) to finish sixth overall. The pair also set new personal bests in all three segments at the event. They then went on to finish fourth at the 2019 Master's de Patinage.

At their next Challenger Series assignment, 2019 CS Warsaw Cup, Lopareva/Brissaud again set another personal best in the rhythm dance. After taking the bronze medal at the senior French Championships, they competed at the European Championships for the first time, placing fifteenth.

Following the season, the team would move their training from Moscow, Russia to Lyon, France, where they were coached by Roxane Petetin, Fabian Bourzat, Ekaterina Rubleva, and Ivan Shefer.

==== 2020–21 season: World Championship debut ====
Lopareva/Brissaud opened the season by winning gold at the 2020 Master's de Patinage. Although they were scheduled to make their Grand Prix debut at the 2020 Internationaux de France, but the event was cancelled as a result of the COVID-19 pandemic. They made their World Championship debut at the 2021 World Championships in Stockholm, placing seventeenth. Their placement combined with the sixteenth-place finish of the other French dance team competing at the championships qualified a single berth for France at the 2022 Winter Olympics, as well as the following year's world championships.

==== 2021–22 season: Grand Prix debut ====
Lopareva/Brissaud made their seasonal Challenger debut at the 2021 CS Lombardia Trophy, placing eighth. They then competed at the 2021 Master's de Patinage, winning the silver medal.

They were initially assigned to make their Grand Prix debut at the 2021 Cup of China, but following its cancellation, they were reassigned to the 2021 Gran Premio d'Italia. They placed sixth at the event, setting new personal bests in the free dance and total score. They went on to finish in fourth place at the 2021 Internationaux de France, setting new personal bests in the rhythm dance and total score. Lopareva said they were "very happy with the result" of their first Grand Prix season.

After winning a silver medal at the International Cup of Nice, Lopareva/Brissaud won their second consecutive national silver medal. They were assigned to the 2022 European Championships in Tallinn, where they finished ninth.

==== 2022–23 season: First French national title; Challenger and Grand Prix medals ====
Prior to the season, it was announced that Lopareva and Brissaud would begin splitting their time between training in Lyon, France under coach Roxane Petetin, and in Montreal, Quebec, Canada under coaches Romain Haguenauer, Marie France Dubreuil, Patrice Lauzon, and Pascal Denis.

They began the season by winning gold at the 2022 Master's de Patinage and silver at the 2022 CS Budapest Trophy. With Gabriella Papadakis and Guillaume Cizeron sitting out at least the season, Lopareva/Brissaud, were the most senior French team assigned to compete at the 2022 Grand Prix de France, where they won the bronze medal, their first on the Grand Prix. They finished fifth at the 2022 NHK Trophy.

At the French championships in Rouen, Lopareva/Brissaud won the national title for the first time in their career. At the 2023 European Championships in Espoo, they finished sixth in the rhythm dance, missing the final flight of the free dance by 0.42 behind Czechs Taschlerová/Taschler. They overtook the Czechs in the free dance, finishing fifth overall. They finished twelfth at the 2023 World Championships. Lopareva/Brissaud then joined Team France for the 2023 World Team Trophy, finishing fifth in the rhythm dance and fourth in the free dance. Team France finished in fifth place.

==== 2023–24 season ====
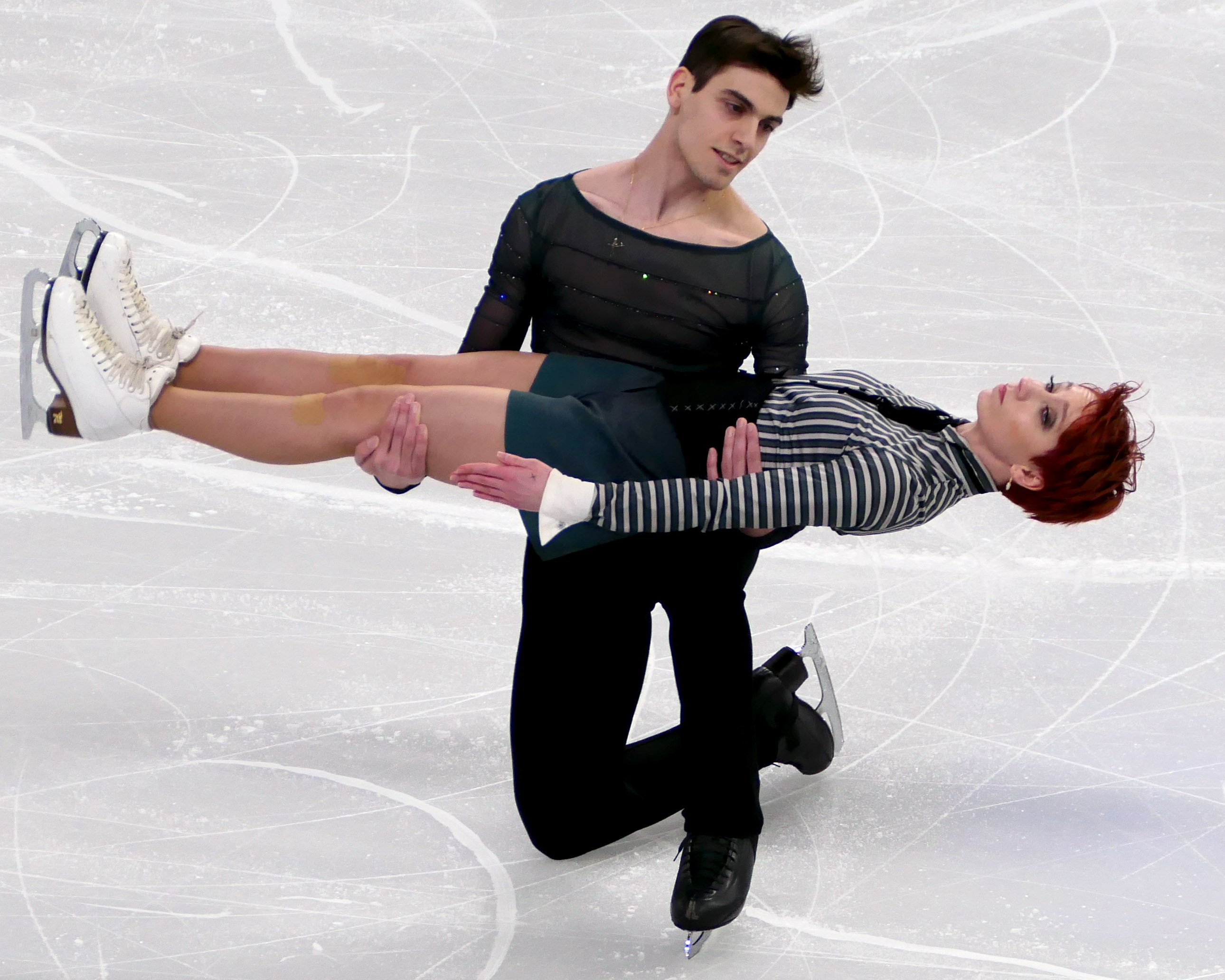
Lopareva and Brissaud performing their rhythm dance at the 2024 World Championships

For the 1980s-themed rhythm dance, Lopareva and Brissaud desired to skate to a less conventional choice, and took their coach's recommendation of the work of French synth-pop singer Mylène Farmer. Their free program was a "biographical" story using the music of Russian composer Sergei Rachmaninoff, with Brissaud playing Rachmaninoff and Lopareva his "muse and inspiration."

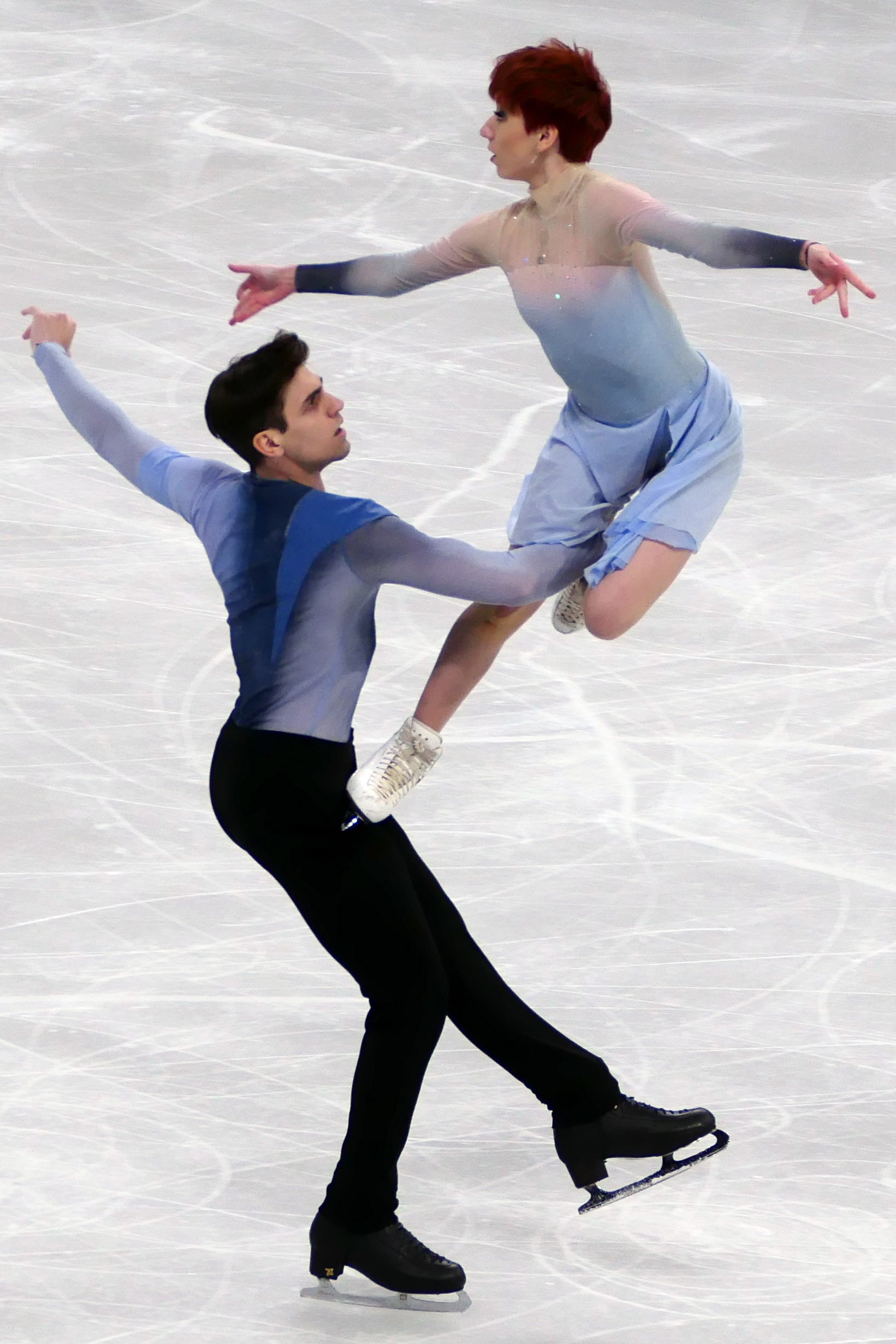
Lopareva and Brissaud performing a lift during their free dance at the 2024 World Championships

Lopareva/Brissaud began the season at the 2023 CS Autumn Classic International, winning the silver medal. They then went on to win gold at the 2023 Master's de Patinage and silver at the 2023 Shanghai Trophy. They started on the Grand Prix at the 2023 Skate America, where they finished third in the rhythm dance, only 0.60 points behind Canadian training mates Lajoie/Lagha. They were third in the free dance as well, albeit slightly further behind second-place, and won the bronze medal. Lopareva called the result "very, very special" given the strong field. With their home Grand Prix de France as their second event, Lopareva/Brissaud finished third in both segments to take the bronze medal. They noted some technical issues, particularly lost levels on their free program dance spin, they said they had felt they had improved their performance elements, with Brissaud saying "we feel like we are improving little by little, step by step." The podium of gold medalists Guignard/Fabbri, silver medalists Fournier Beaudry/Sørensen, and bronze medalists Lopareva/Brissaud was the same as the previous year. Following the Grand Prix, the duo won gold at the 2023 CS Warsaw Cup.

After retaining their French national title, Lopareva/Brissaud competed at the 2024 European Championships, where they placed fourth in both segments and fourth overall, 6.20 points back of bronze medalists Reed/Ambrulevičius of Lithuania.

Lopareva/Brissaud concluded the season at the 2024 World Championships in Montreal, where they finished seventh in the rhythm dance, breaking the 80-point threshold. They dropped to eighth after the free dance, but broke the 200-point threshold overall, which Brissaud called a "gift", noting that the free dance occurred on his birthday.

==== 2024–25 season: European silver and Grand Prix gold ====
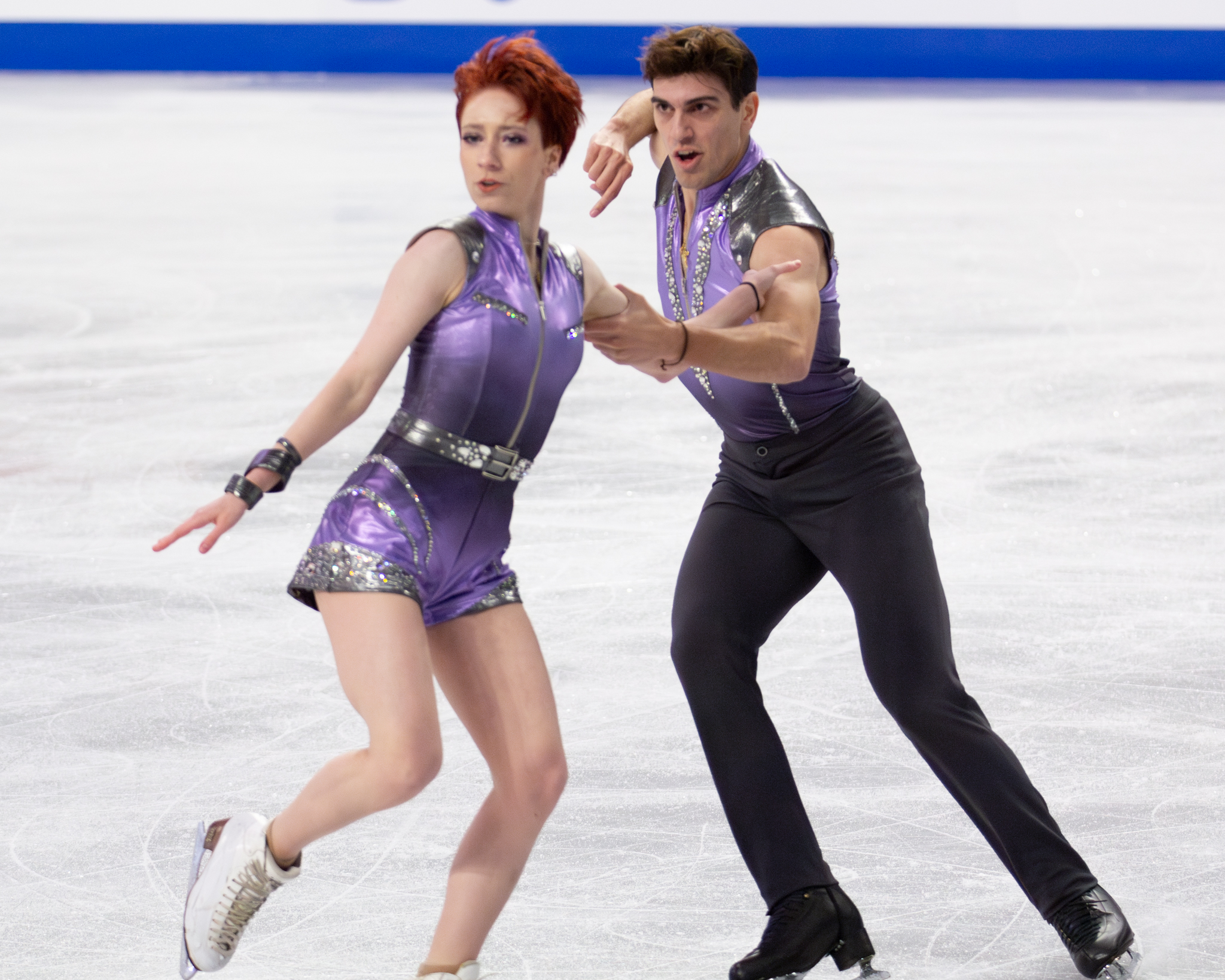
Lopareva and Brissaud perform their rhythm dance at 2024 Skate Canada International

Lopareva/Brissaud made their season debut at the 2024 Master's de Patinage, winning the gold medal. They followed this up with a silver medal at the 2024 Shanghai Trophy. Going on to compete on the 2024–25 Grand Prix circuit, they won the bronze medal at the 2024 Skate Canada International. At the 2024 Grand Prix de France, Lopareva and Brissaud had a surprise victory after Italian pre-event favourites Charlène Guignard and Marco Fabbri unexpectedly faltered during their free dance. Lopareva said she was “speechless and shocked” by the result, adding that it felt “amazing” to have achieved their goal of qualifying for the Grand Prix Final for the first time in their careers. Lopareva/Brissaud subsequently competed on the 2024–25 ISU Challenger Series, winning gold at both the 2024 CS Tallinn Trophy and the 2024 CS Warsaw Cup.

At the Grand Prix Final, held on home ice in Grenoble, the Lopareva/Brissaud finished in sixth place. Both praised the support they had received from the French crowds, Brissaud remarking “when you first start the element, they clap. It's great!” Two weeks later, they captured their third consecutive national title at the 2025 French Championships.

While the ice dance event at the 2025 European Championships had been widely perceived as a contest between defending champions Guignard/Fabbri and the British team Fear/Gibson, Lopareva/Brissaud unexpectedly came second in the rhythm dance, having bested the British in the segment by 1.18 points. They were second in the free dance as well, claiming the silver medal, their first at the European Championships. Brissaud admitted afterward: "It’s a surprise to finish second. We wanted to come for a medal, but we didn’t at all expect the silver."

Lopareva/Brissaud were ninth in both segments at the 2025 World Championships in Boston, but came eighth overall, replicating their placement from the previous year. Lopareva reflected on their European silver medal as "the moment we really realized we had made a step forward this season."

Selected to compete for Team France at the 2025 World Team Trophy, Lopareva/Brissaud finished fourth in the ice dance event and Team France placed fourth overall.

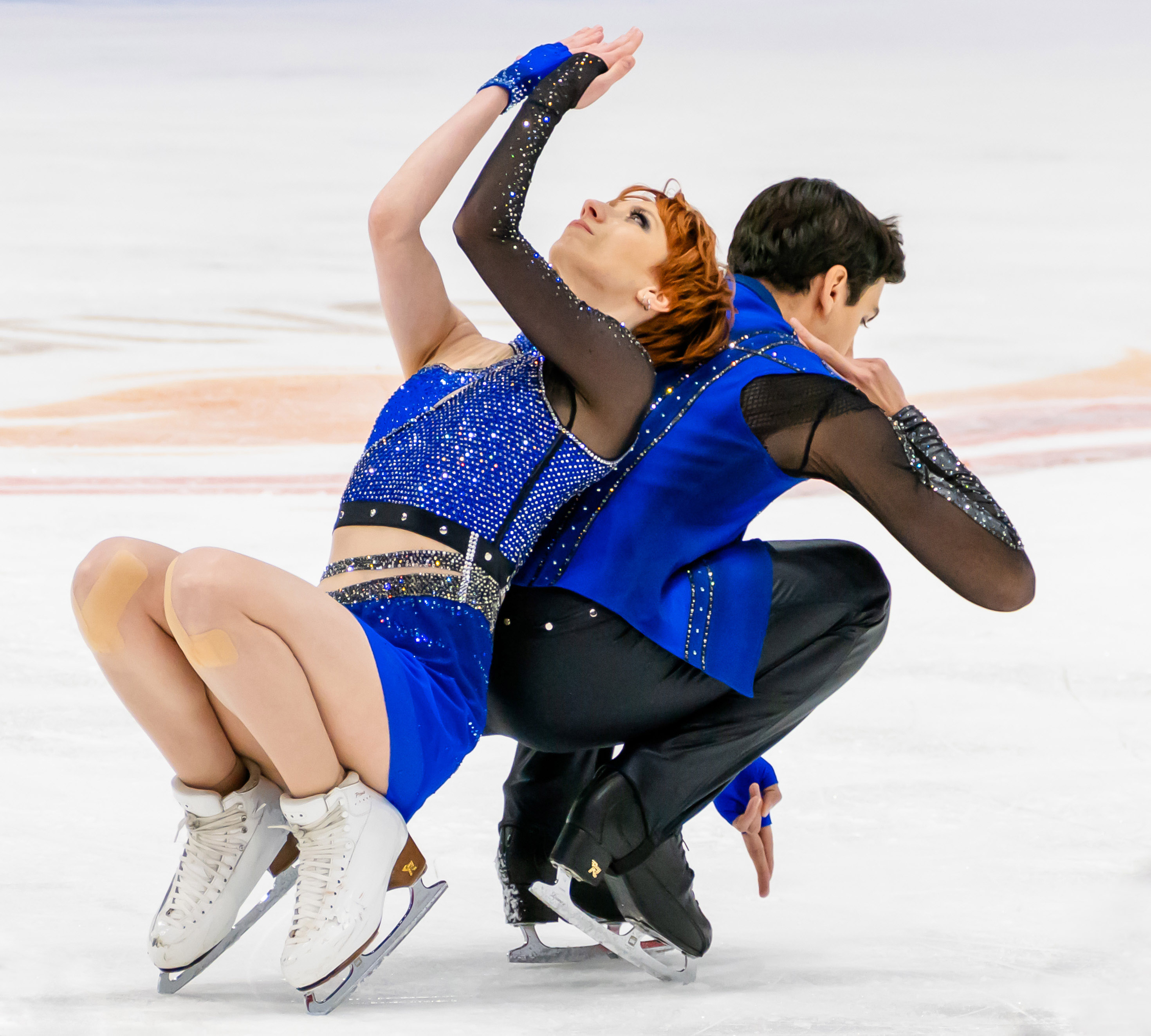
Lopareva and Brissaud perform their rhythm dance at 2025 Skate America

==== 2025–26 season: Milano Cortina Olympics ====
Lopareva/Brissaud opened their season by winning silver at the 2025 Master's de Patinage behind newly formed team, Fournier Beaudry/Cizeron. They followed this up by finishing fourth at the 2025 CS Nepela Memorial.

Going on to compete on the 2025–26 Grand Prix series, winning the bronze medal at the 2025 Cup of China. “Today was stressful, but great,” said Brissaud after the Free Dance. “Maybe because there were more people, or because we absolutely wanted to finally get one good free dance in competition this season.”, said Paula Slater.

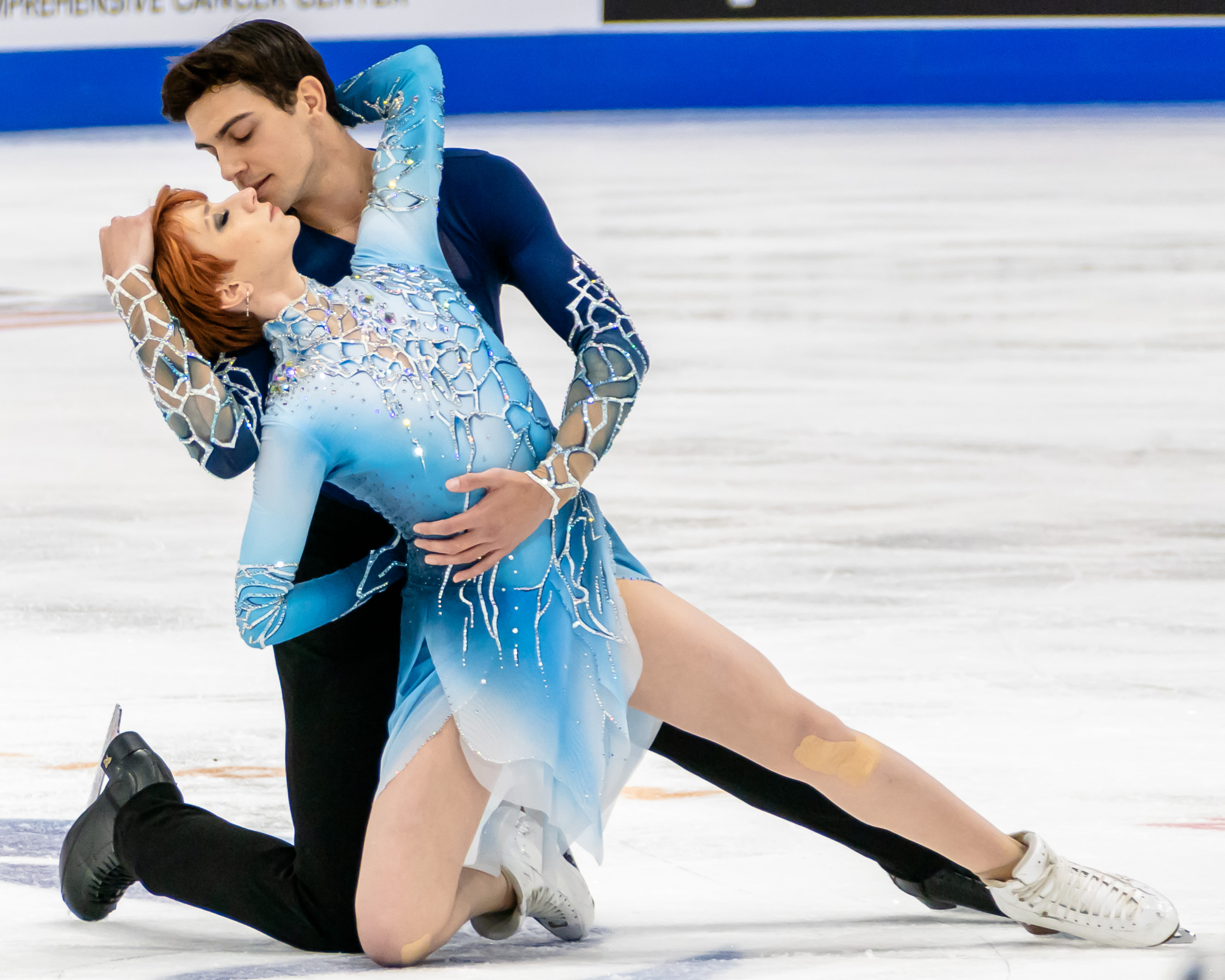
Lopareva and Brissaud perform their free dance at 2025 Skate America

The following month, they earned a bronze medal at 2025 Skate America. When asked about their free dance, Lopareva acknowledged that some viewed them as a "weird" team. “Every time when we search for ideas for the programs, we try to find something unique,” she explained. “We’re trying to do something that will be in our way and that we don’t repeat ourselves. So this season we went with Björk. She herself is a very specific person, a very specific artist.” They followed this up by winning gold at the 2025 CS Warsaw Cup.

In December, Lopareva and Brissaud won the silver medal behind Fournier Beaudry/Cizeron at the 2026 French Championships. They were subsequently named to the 2026 Winter Olympic team. The following month, Lopareva and Brissaud competed at the 2026 European Champions in Sheffield, England, United Kingdom, where they finished in fourth place overall.

Lopareva/Brissaud at the 2026 World Championships

In February, Lopareva and Brissaud competed at the 2026 Winter Olympics placing eighth in their debut at the ice dance event. The team said they were looking forward to competing for another four years. “We want to be stronger, better,” said Brissaud. “We just want to continue pushing our originality and our skills for the next Olympics. We’ve been fighting hard for medals and for what we want.”

The following month, Lopareva and Brissaud placed sixth at the 2026 World Figure Skating Championships. It was their highest placement in their fifth appearance at this event. “After the Olympics, for sure we were a little bit tired, but we didn’t stop,” said Brissaud after the Rhythm Dance. “We came through practice, and we really liked taking part in Art on Ice. We were just like, ‘Go, go, go,’ continue doing practice. There was no time for post-Olympic depression. We just went right away to the next process.”

=== 2026–27 season ===
Lopareva/Brissaud opened their season in August at 2026 Master's de Patinage where they finished first. The team then went on to win the silver at the Lombardia Trophy, a 2026–27 ISU Challenger Series event. In November, they placed second at 2026 Skate Canada International. “We’re very happy,” said Lopareva after the free dance. “There were little levels here and there that we missed, but the process is here. What we worked on is here. And now, like we said yesterday, we continue to progress each competition, and we’ll see.”

Two weeks later, Lopareva/Brissaud competed at 2026 Skate America where they earned the silver behind USA's Emilea Zingas and Vadym Kolesnik. “What we’ve worked on it since the previous Grand Prix,” said Lopareva of the free dance. “We can feel it, we can see it in, in the points, in the levels. So, we’re quite happy about it, and we will continue to do this work.”

== Programs ==
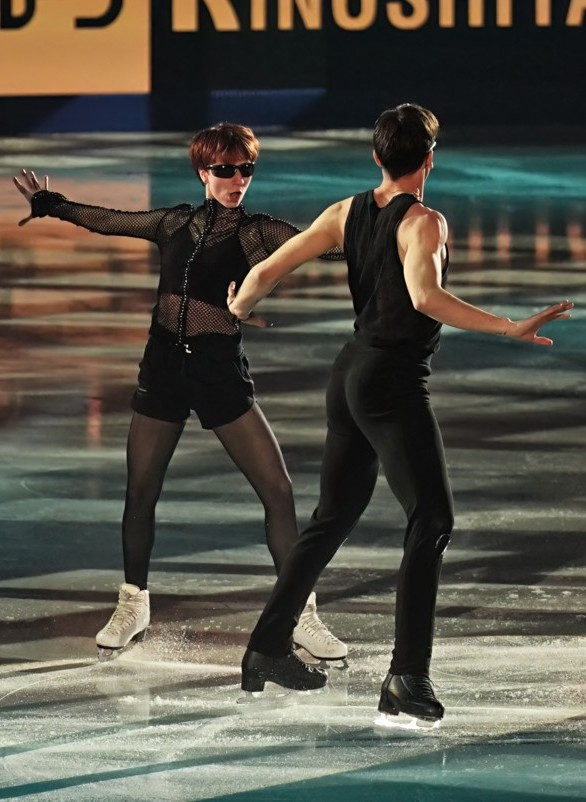
Lopareva and Brissaud performing their exhibition program at the 2024–25 Grand Prix Final

=== Ice dance with Geoffrey Brissaud (for France) ===
Season	Short dance/Rhythm dance	Free dance	Exhibition	Ref.
2018–19	Tango: "El Choclo" Choreo. By Ekaterina Rubleva	Danse macabre By Camille Saint-Saëns Choreo. By Ekaterina Rubleva	—N/a	
2019–21	Foxtrot: "Too Darn Hot"; Quickstep: "Too Darn Hot"; Swing: "Too Darn Hot" (from Kiss Me, Kate) By Cole Porter Choreo. By Sergei Plishkin	"Adagio for Tron" (from Tron: Legacy) By Daft Punk; "Bell Kiss" By Huggy & Dean Newton Choreo. By Sergei Plishkin	—N/a	
2021–22	Hip Hop: "The Next Episode" By Dr. Dre & Snoop Dogg; Blues: "Killing Me Softly with His Song" By Fugees; Hip Hop: "Jump Around" By House of Pain Choreo. By Alexander Zhulin & Kader Belmoktar	"Adagio in Sol Minores" Mi 26 By Hauser; "Allegretto" By Karl Jenkins Choreo. By Alexander Zhulin & Kader Belmoktar	"La Vie en rose" By Édith Piaf; "I Like to Move It" By Reel 2 Real, feat. The Mad Stuntman	
2022–23	Rhumba: "Paxi Ni Ngongo" By Bonga; Samba: "Magalenha" By Sérgio Mendes Choreo. by Guillaume Cizeron & Diana Ribas	"L'Accordéoniste"; "Mon Dieu" All by Édith Piaf Choreo. by Guillaume Cizeron & Diana Ribas	Limelight; The Gold Rush; Modern Times By Charlie Chaplin	
2023–24	"Sans contrefaçon"; "Tristana" All by Mylène Farmer Choreo. by Guillaume Cizeron & Romain Haguenauer	"Elegie in E-Flat Minor", Op. 3, No. 1; "Prélude in C-Sharp Minor", Op. 3, No. 2 All by Sergei Rachmaninoff Choreo. by Guillaume Cizeron & Romain Haguenauer	Limelight; The Gold Rush; Modern Times By Charlie Chaplin	
2023–24	"Sans contrefaçon"; "Tristana" All by Mylène Farmer Choreo. by Guillaume Cizeron & Romain Haguenauer	"Elegie in E-Flat Minor", Op. 3, No. 1; "Prélude in C-Sharp Minor", Op. 3, No. 2 All by Sergei Rachmaninoff Choreo. by Guillaume Cizeron & Romain Haguenauer	"Il est interdit..." By Shanna; "Satisfaction" by Benny Benassi	
2024–25	"Nightflight to Venus"; "Rasputin"; "Rasputin" (Bassflow 4.0 mix) All by Boney M. Choreo. by Guillaume Cizeron & Romain Haguenauer	"Elephant"; "Fugue in D Minor"; "360" By BFRND Choreo. by Guillaume Cizeron & Romain Haguenauer	"Il est interdit..." By Shanna; "Satisfaction" by Benny Benassi	
2025–26	"Blue (Da Ba Dee)" By Eiffel 65; "Revolution 909"; "Da Funk"; "Around the World" By Daft Punk Choreo. by Romain Haguenauer	"All Is Full of Love" By Björk; "The Return" By CLANN; "Bachelorette" By Björk Choreo. by Romain Haguenauer	"Orpheus in the Underworld: Can-Can" By Jacques Offenbach Performed by José Serebrier; "Carmen Suite No. 2: Habanera" By Georges Bizet Performed by London Symphony Orchestra & Neville Marriner; "Abracadabra" By Lady Gaga	

=== Ice dance with Alexei Karpushov (for Russia) ===
Season	Short dance	Free dance
2017–2018	Cha Cha: Kiss by Tom Jones; Samba: In Style and Rhythm by Tom Jones	Moldavian Song by Emir Kusturica; Maki Maki; Mesečina by Goran Bregović
2016–2017	Blues: The Here And After by Jun Miyake; Swing: Forces, Darling by Koop	Foley Room; Bloodstone by Amon Tobin

== Competitive highlights ==
- GP – Event of the ISU Grand Prix Series
- JGP – Event of the ISU Junior Grand Prix Series
- CS – Event of the ISU Challenger Series
- TBD – Assigned
- WD – Withdrew from competition
- Medals at team events are awarded for the team results only. Individual placements at team events are listed in parentheses.

=== Ice dance with Geoffrey Brissaud (for France) ===
Competition placements at senior level
Season	2019–20	2020–21	2021–22	2022–23	2023–24	2024–25	2025–26	2026-27
Winter Olympics							8th	
World Championships		17th		12th	8th	8th	6th	
European Championships	15th		9th	5th	4th	2nd	4th	
Grand Prix Final						6th		TBD
French Championships	3rd	2nd	2nd	1st	1st	1st	2nd	
World Team Trophy				5th (5th)		4th (4th)		
GP Cup of China							3rd	
GP France			4th	3rd	3rd	1st		
GP Italy			6th					
GP NHK Trophy				5th				
GP Skate America					3rd		3rd	2nd
GP Skate Canada						3rd		2nd
CS Autumn Classic					2nd			
CS Budapest Trophy				2nd				
CS Lombardia Trophy			8th					2nd
CS Nepela Memorial	6th						4th	
CS Tallinn Trophy						1st		
CS Warsaw Cup	4th				1st	1st	1st	
Challenge Cup		1st		1st				
Master's de Patinage	4th	1st	2nd	1st	1st	1st	2nd	1st
Shanghai Trophy					2nd	2nd		
Trophée Métropole Nice			2nd					

Competition placements at junior level
Season	2018–19
World Junior Championships	10th
French Championships	2nd
Egna Dance Trophy	2nd
Master's de Patinage	2nd

=== Ice dance with Alexei Karpushov (for Russia) ===
Competition placements at junior level
Season	2015–16	2016–17	2017–18
Russian Championships	9th	9th	
JGP Austria			4th
JGP Czech Republic		4th	

== Detailed results ==
=== Ice dance with Geoffrey Brissaud ===
ISU personal best scores in the +5/-5 GOE System
Segment	Type	Score	Event
Total	TSS	206.76	2025 European Championships
Rhythm dance	TSS	83.07	2026 World Championships
Rhythm dance	TES	47.21	2025 World Team Trophy
Rhythm dance	PCS	36.06	2026 World Championships
Free dance	TSS	124.01	2025 European Championships
Free dance	TES	69.43	2025 European Championships
Free dance	PCS	54.58	2025 European Championships

==== Senior level ====
Results in the 2019–20 season
Date	Event	RD		FD		Total	
Date	Event	P	Score	P	Score	P	Score
Sep 19–21, 2019	(Slovakia) 2019 CS Nepela Memorial	8	63.98	4	101.70	5	165.68
Sep 26–28, 2019	(France) 2019 Master's de Patinage	4	63.76	4	105.47	4	169.23
Nov 14–17, 2019	(Poland) 2019 CS Warsaw Cup	4	65.83	4	101.45	4	167.28
Dec 19–21, 2019	(France) 2020 French Championships	3	71.39	3	111.48	3	182.87
Jan 20–26, 2020	(Austria) 2020 European Championships	8	63.98	4	101.70	5	165.68

Results in the 2020–21 season
Date	Event	RD		FD		Total	
Date	Event	P	Score	P	Score	P	Score
Oct 1–3, 2020	(France) 2020 Master's de Patinage	2	70.43	1	110.82	1	181.25
Feb 5–6, 2021	(France) 2021 French Championships	2	75.42	2	114.12	2	189.54
Feb 26–28, 2021	(Netherlands) 2021 International Challenge Cup	2	75.42	2	114.12	2	189.54
Mar 22–28, 2021	(Sweden) 2021 World Championships	19	66.80	17	102.90	17	169.70

Results in the 2021–22 season
Date	Event	RD		FD		Total	
Date	Event	P	Score	P	Score	P	Score
Sep 10–12, 2021	(Italy) 2021 CS Lombardia Trophy	6	67.43	12	90.00	8	157.43
Sep 30 – Oct 2, 2021	(France) 2021 Master's de Patinage	2	75.83	2	114.97	2	190.80
Oct 20–24, 2021	(France) 2021 Trophée Métropole Nice Côte d'Azur	2	69.01	2	105.68	2	174.69
Nov 5–7, 2021	(Italy) 2021 Gran Premio d'Italia	6	67.31	5	107.32	6	174.63
Nov 19–21, 2021	2021 Internationaux de France	5	69.23	4	106.71	4	175.94
Dec 16–18, 2022	(France) 2022 French Championships	2	76.64	2	119.28	2	195.92
Jan 10–16, 2022	(Estonia) 2022 European Championships	10	70.22	9	108.12	9	178.34

Results in the 2022–23 season
Date	Event	RD		FD		Total	
Date	Event	P	Score	P	Score	P	Score
Oct 6–8, 2022	(France) 2022 Master's de Patinage	1	79.90	1	121.23	1	201.13
Oct 13–16, 2022	(Hungary) 2022 CS Budapest Trophy	2	76.83	2	116.02	2	192.85
Nov 4–6, 2022	2022 Grand Prix de France	3	73.17	3	113.98	3	187.15
Nov 18–20, 2022	(Japan) 2022 NHK Trophy	6	72.84	5	111.79	5	184.63
Dec 15–17, 2022	(France) 2023 French Championships	1	76.87	1	121.22	1	198.09
Jan 23–29, 2023	(Finland) 2023 European Championships	6	76.49	5	115.36	5	191.85
Feb 23–26, 2023	(Netherlands) 2023 International Challenge Cup	1	77.33	1	119.13	1	196.46
Mar 20–26, 2023	(Japan) 2023 World Championships	12	72.80	13	110.81	12	183.61
Apr 13–16, 2023	(Japan) 2023 World Team Trophy	5	76.15	4	118.52	5 (5)	194.67

Results in the 2023–24 season
Date	Event	RD		FD		Total	
Date	Event	P	Score	P	Score	P	Score
Sep 14–16, 2023	(Canada) 2023 CS Autumn Classic International	2	72.28	1	114.66	2	186.94
Sep 28–30, 2023	(France) 2023 Master's de Patinage	1	81.14	1	116.42	1	197.56
Oct 3–5, 2023	(China) 2023 Shanghai Trophy	2	73.56	2	112.16	2	185.72
Oct 20–22, 2023	(United States) 2023 Skate America	3	77.20	3	116.27	3	193.47
Nov 3–5, 2023	2023 Grand Prix de France	3	76.95	3	113.87	3	190.82
Nov 16–19, 2023	(Poland) 2023 CS Warsaw Cup	1	77.84	1	118.62	1	196.56
Dec 10–14, 2023	(France) 2024 French Championships	1	84.11	1	119.29	1	203.40
Jan 8–14, 2024	(Lithuania) 2024 European Championships	4	78.47	4	118.70	4	197.17
Mar 18–24, 2024	(Canada) 2024 World Championships	7	80.01	8	120.27	8	200.28

Results in the 2024–25 season
Date	Event	RD		FD		Total	
Date	Event	P	Score	P	Score	P	Score
Sep 26–28, 2024	(France) 2024 Master's de Patinage	1	82.19	1	118.52	1	200.71
Oct 3–5, 2024	(China) 2024 Shanghai Trophy	3	77.35	2	118.03	2	195.38
Oct 25–27, 2024	2024 Skate Canada International	3	76.76	3	117.49	3	194.25
Oct 31 – Nov 3, 2024	2024 Grand Prix de France	2	77.75	1	117.52	1	195.27
Nov 12–17, 2024	(Estonia) 2024 CS Tallinn Trophy	1	78.93	1	119.98	1	198.91
Nov 20–24, 2024	(Poland) 2024 CS Warsaw Cup	1	80.36	1	121.53	1	201.89
Dec 5–8, 2024	(France) 2024–25 Grand Prix Final	5	76.98	6	118.93	6	195.91
Dec 20–21, 2024	(France) 2025 French Championships	1	83.42	1	130.76	1	214.18
Jan 28 – Feb 2, 2025	(Estonia) 2025 European Championships	2	82.75	4	124.01	2	206.76
Mar 26–30, 2025	(United States) 2025 World Championships	9	76.74	9	117.89	8	194.63
Apr 17–20, 2025	(Japan) 2025 World Team Trophy	4	81.78	5	116.44	4 (4)	198.22

Results in the 2025–26 season
Date	Event	RD		FD		Total	
Date	Event	P	Score	P	Score	P	Score
Aug 28–30, 2025	(France) 2025 Master's de Patinage	2	80.30	3	113.38	2	193.68
Sep 25–27, 2025	(Slovakia) 2025 CS Nepela Memorial	4	72.09	3	111.31	4	183.40
Oct 24–26, 2025	2025 Cup of China	3	77.62	4	118.98	3	196.60
Nov 14–16, 2025	(United States) 2025 Skate America	3	76.72	3	115.89	3	192.61
Nov 19–23, 2025	(Poland) 2025 CS Warsaw Cup	1	80.46	1	121.60	1	202.06
Dec 18–20, 2025	(France) 2026 French Championships	2	81.65	2	122.15	2	203.80
Jan 13–18, 2026	(United Kingdom) 2026 European Championships	5	82.38	4	122.34	4	204.72
Feb 9-11, 2026	(Italy) 2026 Winter Olympics	8	82.25	8	121.43	8	203.68
Mar 24–29, 2026	(Czech Republic) 2026 World Championships	5	83.07	7	120.70	6	203.77

Results in the 2026–27 season
Date	Event	RD		FD		Total	
Date	Event	P	Score	P	Score	P	Score
Aug 27–29, 2026	(France) 2026 Master's de Patinage	1	81.45	1	117.43	1	198.88
Sep 17–20, 2026	(Italy) 2026 CS Lombardia Trophy	1	79.21	2	108.14	2	187.35
Oct 30 - Nov 1, 2026	2026 Skate Canada International	2	77.90	2	115.05	2	192.95

==== Junior level ====
Results in the 2018–19 season
Date	Event	RD		FD		Total	
Date	Event	P	Score	P	Score	P	Score
Sep 25–27, 2018	(France) 2018 Master's de Patinage	2	53.29	2	81.20	2	134.49
Feb 1–3, 2019	(Italy) 2019 Egna Dance Trophy	2	58.56	2	90.06	2	148.62
Feb 22–24, 2019	(France) 2019 French Championships (Junior)	2	58.55	2	87.76	2	146.31
Mar 4–10, 2019	(Croatia) 2019 World Junior Championships	10	57.99	10	83.99	10	141.98
