= Amélie-les-crayons =

French singer-songwriter

Amélie-les-Crayons
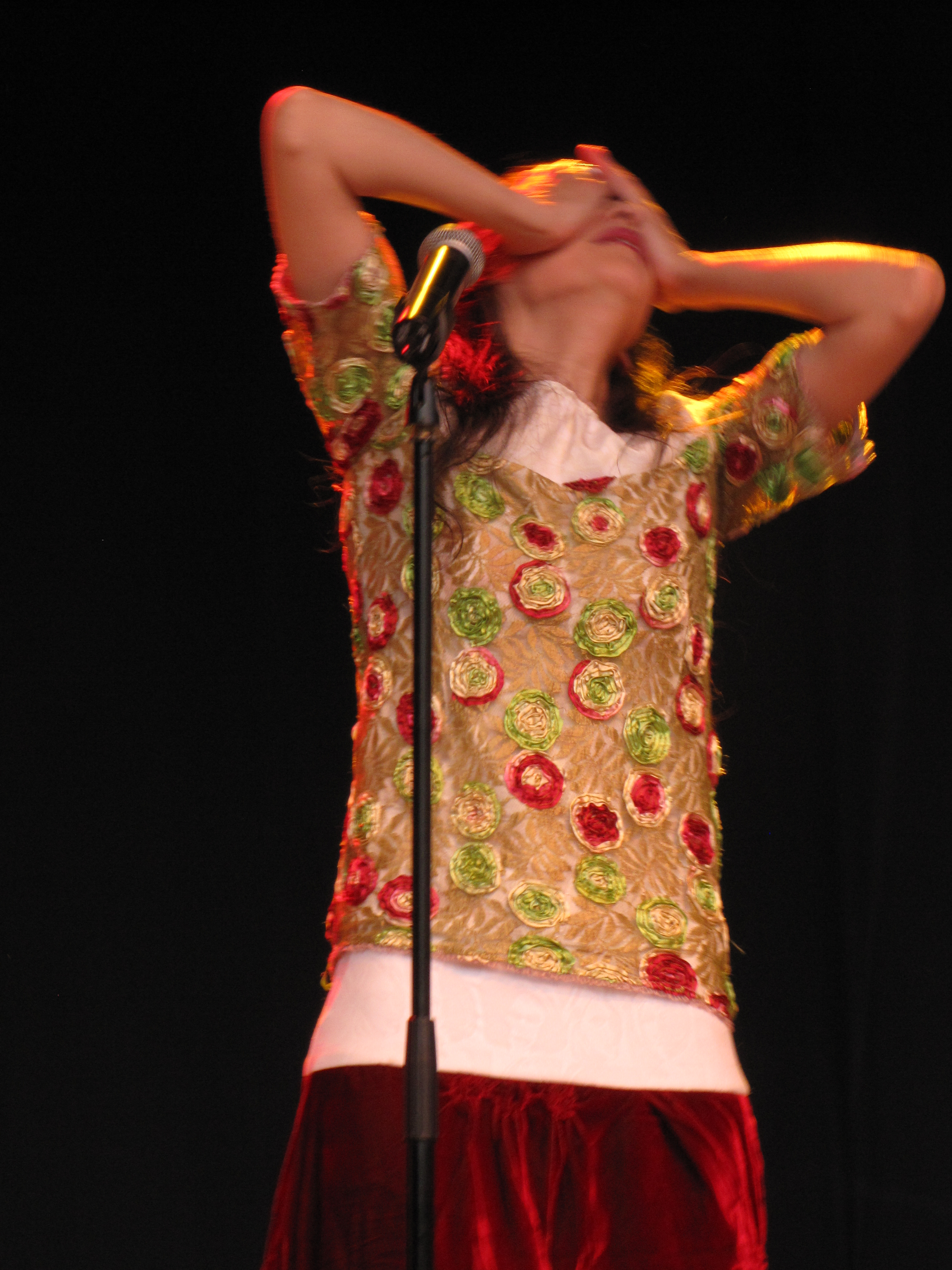
- Amélie spectacle "La porte plume" at the Fête de Lutte Ouvrière, 2009

Background information
- Origin: Lyon, France
- Genres: Chanson
- Years active: 2002–present
- Labels: Neômme
- Members: Amélie, Olivier Longre, Guillaume Clary, Antoine
- Website: amelielescrayons.com

Amélie-les-crayons (born 1978 in Vienne, Lyon) is a French singer-songwriter, with an emphasis on theatricality and humour in her performances and that of her group.

== Musical career ==
=== 2001–2003: the beginning ===
Amélie started in 2001 in bars and cafés in Lyon, France, as a solo piano singer. A 6-track CD, Le Chant des Coquelicots, was released in 2002. In 2003, she put a real band together with funny-haired Heiko (piano, clarinet, tuba), Michel (accordion) and Laurent (double bass). They soon were very popular in their region, then over France and Switzerland. An ambitious theatrical show was created in January 2004 introducing the magical piano (which opens itself and grows flowers in the inside), funny special effects and the astonishing contact that Amélie creates with her audience.

=== 2004–2006: les crayons ===
After the release of the new album Et Pourquoi les Crayons? in May 2004, they went on touring over France, Switzerland, Belgium and Canada up to August 2006, nearly 200 concerts and 100 000 spectators. The show was shot in December 2005 for a DVD 'le Tour de la Question'. In July 2006, Amélie said good bye to her hometown audience in the Roman Theatre of Vienne, this time in front of a crowd of 8000. By the end of 2006, a few new songs were written and Amelie started working with long-time friend Olivier Longre who plays about 20 different instruments and by the end of spring 2007, they were ready to record 15 new songs.

=== 2007–2009 : the monster piano ===
The album 'La Porte Plume' was released in October 2007 and a new tour began that would end in December 2009. That time, the show was even more extraordinary : a 2-meter-high door-piano was the central character of a musical set where Amelie surrounded by her 3 boys (Olivier, Antoine and Guillaume) would appear, vanish, be suspended in mid-air, reappear on top of the monster-piano. The show was shot in March 2009 for the DVD 'A l'Ouest' released in August.

=== 2010 : writing again ===
Amelie was preparing a new show for 2011. In the meantime, she was also collaborating to other artists shows or albums.

== Discography ==
- 2002 – Le chant des coquelicots
- 2004 – Et pourquoi les crayons?
- 2006 – Le tour de la question DVD
- 2007 – La porte plume
- 2009 – A l'ouest, je te plumerai la tête DVD
- 2012 – Jusqu'a La Mer
- 2014 - Meli Melo
- 2017 - Mille Ponts
