= Adelina Galyavieva =

Russian-French ice dancer

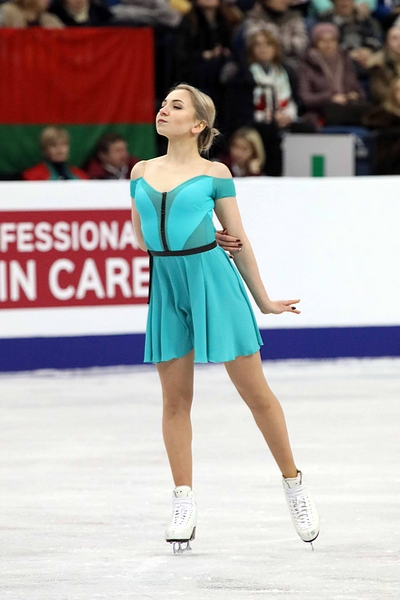
- Galyavieva in 2019

Personal information
- Native name: Аделина Зульфатовна Галявиева (Russian)
- Full name: Adelina Zulfatovna Galyavieva
- Other names: Galayavieva
- Born: October 2, 1996 (age 30) Kazan, Russia
- Height: 1.60 m (5 ft 3 in)

Figure skating career
- Country: France
- Coach: Anjelika Krylova; Oleg Volkov
- Skating club: Français Volants
- Began skating: 2002
Medal record
Representing France
Winter Universiade
Bronze medal – third place	2019 Krasnoyarsk	Ice dancing

Adelina Zulfatovna Galyavieva (Russian: Аделина Зульфатовна Галявиева, born 2 October 1996) is a Russian-French ice dancer. With her former skating partner, Louis Thauron, she is the 2021 French National Champion, the 2018 Bosphorus Cup bronze medalist and made her Grand Prix debut at the 2018 Internationaux de France.

== Personal life ==
Galyavieva was born on 2 October 1996 in Kazan, Russia. She has also resided in Moscow and Lyon, and has received French citizenship.

== Career ==
=== Early years ===
Galyavieva began skating as a six-year-old, in 2002. As a junior ice dancer, she competed first with Vladislav Antonov and later with Alexei Karpushov, coached by Alexander Zhulin and Oleg Volkov in Moscow. She made no international appearances for Russia.

=== Partnership with Abecassis ===
In 2014, Galyavieva began a partnership with French ice dancer Laurent Abecassis and changed her country of representation to France. The two were coached by Muriel Zazoui, Diana Ribas, and Olivier Schoenfelder in Lyon, France. In 2015, they competed at an ISU Junior Grand Prix event, placing 8th in Bratislava, Slovakia.

Galyavieva/Abecassis made their senior international debut at the International Cup of Nice in October 2016. They competed at six further internationals, including two ISU Challenger Series events, but won no medals. The International Cup of Nice in October 2017 was their final competition as a team.

=== Partnership with Thauron ===
Galyavieva teamed up with French ice dancer Louis Thauron after a tryout in Lyon on 14 February 2018. The two decided to represent France but train in Moscow, coached by Russia's Anjelika Krylova and Oleg Volkov. Making their debut, they placed 8th at the 2018 CS Ondrej Nepela Trophy in September.

As France's host pick, Galyavieva/Thauron competed at the 2018 Internationaux de France, placing 10th overall at the November Grand Prix event. In December, they won their first international medal, bronze at Turkey's Bosphorus Cup, and then took bronze at the French Championships. They were subsequently named to France's team for the 2019 European Championships, where they placed twelfth.

== Programs ==
=== With Thauron ===
Season	Rhythm dance	Free dance	Exhibition
2020–2021	Mamma Mia!: Swing: Dancing Queen; Slow Fox: I Have a Dream; Swing: Dancing Queen	Perfume: The Story of a Murderer by Tom Tykwer, Johnny Klimek	
2019–2020	Mamma Mia!: Swing: Dancing Queen; Slow Fox: I Have a Dream; Swing: Dancing Queen	Carmen by Georges Bizet	
2018–2019	Flamenco: Flamenco performed by Antonio Gades, Cristina Hoyos; Tango: Tango Flamenco performed by Armik	Amélie by Yann Tiersen	Stay by Gorod 312

=== With Abecassis ===
Season	Short dance	Free dance
2016–2017	Satellite	Hound Dog by Elvis Presley; Money Honey covered by Elvis Presley; Respect by Aretha Franklin; You Should Be Dancing by Bee Gees; Thriller by Michael Jackson; I Want It That Way by Backstreet Boys; Can't Hold Us by Macklemore & Ryan Lewis; Shape of You by Ed Sheeran
2015–2016	Waltz: Ta P'tite Flamme by Amélie-les-crayons; Polka: Ivan, Boris et moi by Marie Laforêt	Pretty Woman; Oh, Pretty Woman by Roy Orbison; Fallen by Lauren Wood; He Sleeps / Love Theme by James Newton Howard

== Competitive highlights ==
GP: Grand Prix; CS: Challenger Series; JGP: Junior Grand Prix

=== With Thauron ===
International
Event	18–19	19–20	20–21	21–22
Worlds			16th	
Europeans	12th	12th		
GP France	10th		C	WD
GP Rostelecom		8th		WD
CS Cup of Austria				WD
CS Lombardia		9th		
CS Ondrej Nepela	8th			
Bosphorus Cup	3rd			
Denis Ten Memorial		2nd		
Egna Trophy		3rd		
Mezzaluna Cup		2nd		
Universiade	3rd			
Volvo Open Cup	4th			
National
French Champ.	3rd	2nd	1st	
Masters	2nd	3rd	WD	
Team events
World Team Trophy			5th T 4th P	
TBD = Assigned; WD = Withdrew; C = Event cancelled T = Team Result; P = Personal result. Medals awarded for team result only

=== With Abecassis ===
International
Event	14–15	15–16	16–17	17–18
CS Lombardia Trophy				12th
CS Tallinn Trophy			7th	
Bavarian Open			5th	
Cup of Nice			12th	15th
Toruń Cup			8th	
Volvo Open Cup			6th	
International
JGP Slovakia		8th		
NRW Trophy	11th	9th		
Open d'Andorra		2nd		
Santa Claus Cup	12th			
Toruń Cup		1st		
National
French Champ.			4th	
French Jr. Champ.	3rd	5th		
Masters		2nd J	4th	4th
J = Junior level
