= Noël-Antoine Pierre =

French pair skater (born 1995)

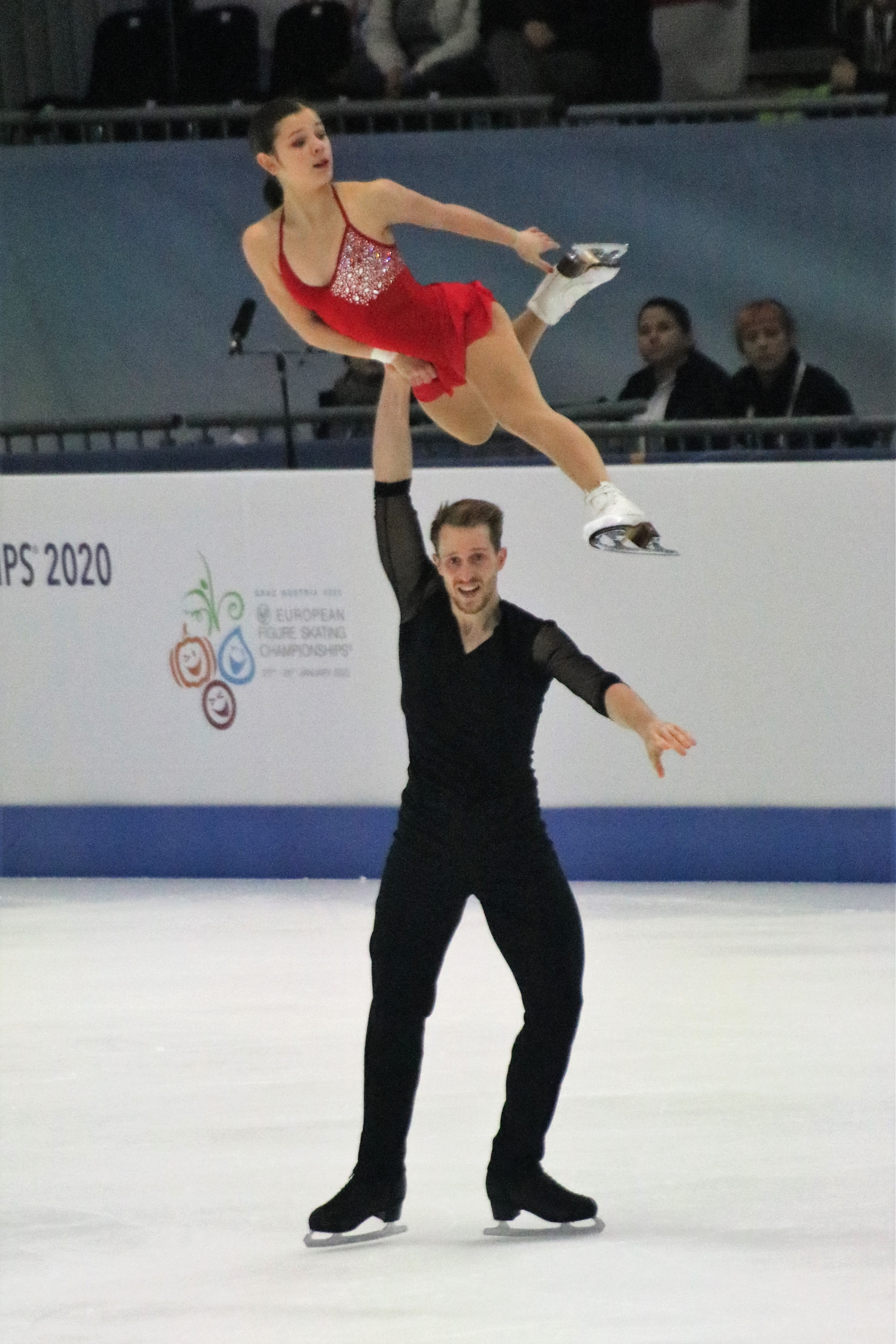
- Coline Keriven and Noël-Antoine Pierre at the 2020 European Championships

Personal information
- Other names: Antoine Pierre
- Born: 23 June 1995 (age 31) Saint-Martin-d'Hères, France
- Height: 1.77 m (5 ft 9 1/2 in)

Figure skating career
- Country: France
- Discipline: Pair skating (since 2017); Men's singles (2010–14)
- Partner: Tilda Alteryd (2024-25); Lori-Ann Matte (2023-24); Coline Keriven (2017-22)
- Coach: Claude Péri
- Skating club: Français Volants de Paris
- Began skating: 2001

Medal record
French Championships
Silver medal – second place	2021 Vaujany	Pairs
Silver medal – second place	2022 Cergy-Pontoise	Pairs
Bronze medal – third place	2018 Nantes	Pairs
Bronze medal – third place	2020 Dunkirk	Pairs
Bronze medal – third place	2024 Vaujany	Pairs

Noël-Antoine Pierre (born 23 June 1995) is a French pair skater. With his former skating partner, Coline Keriven, he is a four-time French national medalist (2018, 2020–22) and the 2018 Volvo Open Cup bronze medalist. They competed in the final segment at the 2020 European Championships.

As a singles skater, he is the 2012 French junior national champion, the 2012 Bavarian Open junior champion, and the 2013 Denkova-Staviski Cup bronze medalist.

He was briefly paired with Lori-Ann Matte. He most recently paired with Tilda Alteryd.

== Programs ==
Season	Short program	Free skating
2021–2022	She Caught the Katy by The Blues Brothers; Let There Be Drums by Sandy Nelson & the Carl LaFong Trio; Think by Aretha Franklin choreo. by Line Haddad, Pierre-Loup Bouquet	U-Turn (Lili) by AaRON choreo. by Line Haddad
2020–2021	Caught Out in the Rain by Beth Hart choreo. by Nathalie Péchalat	U-Turn (Lili) by AaRON choreo. by Line Haddad
2019–2020	Caught Out in the Rain by Beth Hart choreo. by Nathalie Péchalat	Entre Olas by Juan Serrano; Tuyo by Rodrigo Amarante; Tamacun by Rodrigo y Gabriela choreo. by Nathalie Péchalat
2017–2018	I Know Where I've Been (from Hairspray) performed by Queen Latifah; Valerie by The Zutons performed by Mark Ronson and Amy Winehouse	Money by Pink Floyd; Oh! Darling by The Beatles; (I Can't Get No) Satisfaction by The Rolling Stones

== Competitive highlights ==
CS: Challenger Series

=== With Alteryd ===
International
Event	24-25
CS Golden Spin of Zagreb	12th
Merano Ice Trophy	7th

=== With Matte ===
National
Event	23–24
Masters	4th

=== With Keriven ===
International
Event	17–18	18–19	19–20	20–21	21–22
Worlds			C	23rd	
Europeans			11th		17th
GP France				C	8th
CS Golden Spin			9th		WD
CS Nebelhorn Trophy				5th	13th
CS Tallinn Trophy	6th				
CS Warsaw Cup			8th		
Challenge Cup	5th		6th	5th	
Lombardia Trophy					6th
Tayside Trophy					4th
Volvo Open Cup		3rd			
National
French Champ.	3rd		3rd	2nd	2nd
Masters	4th	WD		2nd	1st

=== Single skating ===
International
Event	10–11	11–12	12–13	13–14
Coupe du Printemps			6th	
Crystal Skate				9th
Denkova-Staviski Cup			3rd	
Gardena Spring				5th
International: Junior
Bavarian Open		1st		
Triglav Trophy	4th			
National
French Champ.		4th		7th
French Junior Champ.		1st	4th	4th
Masters		9th J	3rd J	
