= Coline Keriven =

French pair skater (born 2000)

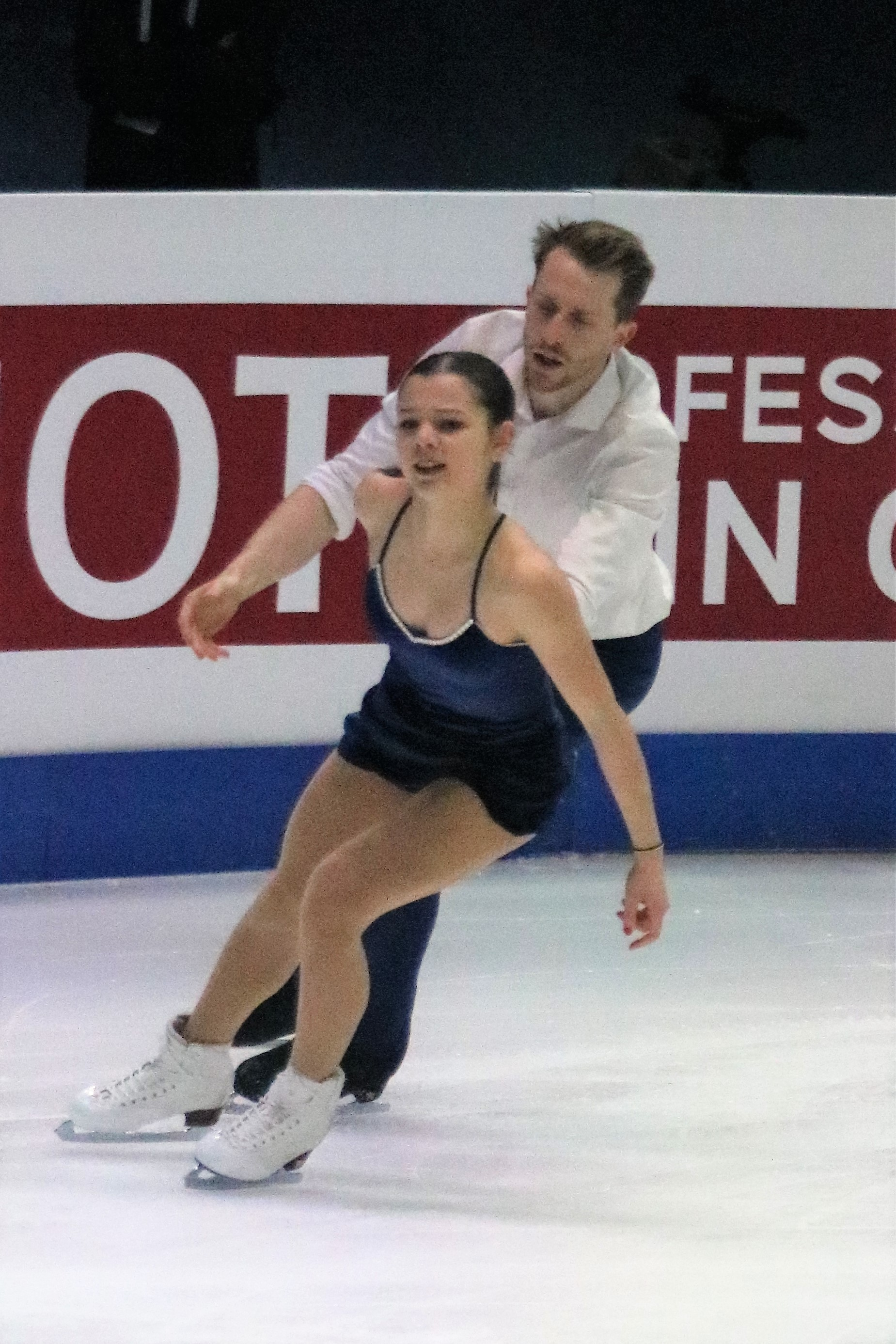
- Coline Keriven and Noël-Antoine Pierre at the 2020 European Championships

Personal information
- Born: 28 August 2000 (age 25) Saint-Maur-des-Fossés, France
- Home town: Paris, France
- Height: 1.55 m (5 ft 1 in)

Figure skating career
- Country: France
- Discipline: Pair skating
- Partner: Tom Bouvart (2022–23); Noël-Antoine Pierre (2017–22)
- Coach: Claude Péri
- Skating club: Français Volants de Paris
- Began skating: 2004

Coline Keriven (born 28 August 2000) is a retired French pair skater. With her former skating partner, Noël-Antoine Pierre, she is a four-time French national medalist (2018, 2020–22) and the 2018 Volvo Open Cup bronze medalist. They competed in the final segment at the 2020 European Championships.

== Programs ==
Season	Short program	Free skating
2021–2022	She Caught the Katy by The Blues Brothers; Let There Be Drums by Sandy Nelson & the Carl LaFong Trio; Think by Aretha Franklin choreo. by Line Haddad, Pierre-Loup Bouquet	U-Turn (Lili) by AaRON choreo. by Line Haddad
2020–2021	Caught Out in the Rain by Beth Hart choreo. by Nathalie Péchalat	U-Turn (Lili) by AaRON choreo. by Line Haddad
2019–2020	Caught Out in the Rain by Beth Hart choreo. by Nathalie Péchalat	Entre Olas by Juan Serrano; Tuyo by Rodrigo Amarante; Tamacun by Rodrigo y Gabriela choreo. by Nathalie Péchalat
2017–2018	I Know Where I've Been (from Hairspray) performed by Queen Latifah; Valerie by The Zutons performed by Mark Ronson and Amy Winehouse	Money by Pink Floyd; Oh! Darling by The Beatles; (I Can't Get No) Satisfaction by The Rolling Stones

== Competitive highlights ==
GP: Grand Prix; CS: Challenger Series

=== With Bouvart ===
International
Event	22–23
CS Nebelhorn Trophy	WD
CS Warsaw Cup	12th
Bavarian Open	9th
National
Masters	4th

=== With Pierre ===
International
Event	17–18	18–19	19–20	20–21	21–22
Worlds			C	23rd	
Europeans			11th		17th
GP France				C	8th
CS Golden Spin			9th		WD
CS Nebelhorn Trophy				5th	13th
CS Tallinn Trophy	6th				
CS Warsaw Cup			8th		
Challenge Cup	5th		6th	5th	
Cup of Nice					6th
Lombardia Trophy					6th
Tayside Trophy					4th
Volvo Open Cup		3rd			
National
French Champ.	3rd		3rd	2nd	2nd
Masters	4th	WD		2nd	1st
