= 1970 Prize of Moscow News =

- Date: December 17 – 20
- Season: 1970-71
- Location: Moscow

Champions
- Men's singles: Sergei Chetverukhin (URS)
- Ladies' singles: Marina Titova (URS)
- Pairs: Lyudmila Smirnova / Andrei Suraikin (URS)
- Ice dance: Lyudmila Pakhomova / Alexander Gorshkov (URS)
- Previous: 1969 Prize of Moscow News
- Next: 1971 Prize of Moscow News

The 1970 Prize of Moscow News was the fifth edition of an international figure skating competition organized in Moscow, Soviet Union. It was held December 17–20, 1970. Medals were awarded in the disciplines of men's singles, ladies' singles, pair skating and ice dancing. Soviets swept the men's podium, with Sergei Chetverukhin defeating Sergey Volkov for the title. Marina Titova took the ladies' title ahead of skaters from East and West Germany. Lyudmila Smirnova / Andrei Suraikin won the pairs title ahead of Olympic champions Ludmila Belousova / Oleg Protopopov. Soviets also swept the ice dancing podium, led by World champions Lyudmila Pakhomova / Alexander Gorshkov.

== Men ==
| Rank | Name | Nation |
|---|---|---|
| 1 | Sergei Chetverukhin | Soviet Union |
| 2 | Sergey Volkov | Soviet Union |
| 3 | Vladimir Kovalev | Soviet Union |
| 4 | Yuri Ovchinnikov | Soviet Union |
| 5 | Zdenek Pazdirek | Czechoslovakia |
| 6 | Vladimir Kuksinsky | Soviet Union |
| ... | | |

== Ladies ==
| Rank | Name | Nation |
|---|---|---|
| 1 | Marina Titova | Soviet Union |
| 2 | Simone Gräfe | East Germany |
| 3 | Gundi Niesen | West Germany |
| 4 | Natalia Ovchinnikova | Soviet Union |
| 5 | | |
| 6 | Liana Drahova | Czechoslovakia |
| ... | | |

== Pairs ==
| Rank | Name | Nation |
|---|---|---|
| 1 | Lyudmila Smirnova / Andrei Suraikin | Soviet Union |
| 2 | Galina Karelina / Georgi Proskurin | Soviet Union |
| 3 | Ludmila Belousova / Oleg Protopopov | Soviet Union |
| 4 | Tatiana Sharanova / Anatoli Evdokimov | Soviet Union |
| 5 | Almut Lehmann / Herbert Wiesinger | West Germany |
| 6 | Manuela Groß / Uwe Kagelmann | East Germany |
| 7 | Marlies Radunsky / Rolf Österreich | East Germany |
| 8 | Annette Kansy / Axel Salzmann | East Germany |
| ... | | |
| DNF | Irina Rodnina / Alexei Ulanov | Soviet Union |

== Ice dancing ==
| Rank | Name | Nation |
|---|---|---|
| 1 | Lyudmila Pakhomova / Alexander Gorshkov | Soviet Union |
| 2 | Tatiana Voitiuk / Viacheslav Zhigalin | Soviet Union |
| 3 | Elena Zharkova / Gennadi Karponosov | Soviet Union |
| 4 | Diana Skotnicka / Martin Skotnicky | Czechoslovakia |
| 5 | Svetlana Alexeeva / Alexander Boichuk | Soviet Union |
| 6 | Irina Moiseeva / Andrei Minenkov | Soviet Union |
| ... | | |
