= 1971 Prize of Moscow News =

Figure skating competition

- Date: November 25 – 28
- Season: 1971-72
- Location: Moscow

Champions
- Men's singles: Sergei Chetverukhin (URS)
- Ladies' singles: Marina Titova (URS)
- Pairs: Ludmila Belousova / Oleg Protopopov (URS)
- Ice dance: Lyudmila Pakhomova / Alexander Gorshkov (URS)
- Previous: 1970 Prize of Moscow News
- Next: 1972 Prize of Moscow News

The 1971 Prize of Moscow News was the sixth edition of an international figure skating competition organized in Moscow, Soviet Union. It was held November 25–28, 1971. Medals were awarded in the disciplines of men's singles, ladies' singles, pair skating and ice dancing. Soviets swept the men's podium, led by Sergei Chetverukhin. The ladies' category was won by Marina Titova, who took the title for the second consecutive year. Olympic champions Ludmila Belousova / Oleg Protopopov won the pairs' title, defeating two pairs who had beaten them a year earlier. World champions Lyudmila Pakhomova / Alexander Gorshkov took gold in the ice dancing event for the third consecutive year.

== Men ==
Rank	Name	Nation
1	Sergei Chetverukhin	Soviet Union
2	Vladimir Kovalev	Soviet Union
3	Sergey Volkov	Soviet Union
4	Igor Bobrin	Soviet Union
5	Yutaka Higuchi	Japan
6	Bernd Wunderlich	East Germany
7	Jozef Žídek	Czechoslovakia
8	Zdeněk Pazdírek	Czechoslovakia
...		

== Ladies ==
Rank	Name	Nation
1	Marina Titova	Soviet Union
2	Elena Kotova	Soviet Union
3	Steffi Knoll	East Germany
4	Cinzia Frosio	Italy
...		

== Pairs ==
Rank	Name	Nation
1	Ludmila Belousova / Oleg Protopopov	Soviet Union
2	Liudmila Smirnova / Andrei Suraikin	Soviet Union
3	Galina Karelina / Georgi Proskurin	Soviet Union
4		
5		
6	Romy Kermer / Andreas Forner	East Germany
7	Sylvia Johne / Detlef Kurzweck	East Germany
8	Sylvia Konzack / Veit Kempe	East Germany
...		

== Ice dancing ==
Rank	Name	Nation
1	Lyudmila Pakhomova / Alexander Gorshkov	Soviet Union
2	Tatiana Voitiuk / Viacheslav Zhigalin	Soviet Union
3	Elena Zharkova / Gennadi Karponosov	Soviet Union
4	Svetlana Alexeeva / Alexander Boichuk	Soviet Union
5	Diana Skotnická / Martin Skotnický	Czechoslovakia
...		
