= 1968 Prize of Moscow News =

- Date: December 12 – 15
- Season: 1968-69
- Location: Moscow

Champions
- Men's singles: Sergei Chetverukhin (URS)
- Ladies' singles: Elena Shcheglova (URS)
- Pairs: Tamara Moskvina / Alexei Mishin (URS)
- Ice dance: Annerose Baier / Eberhard Rüger (GDR)
- Previous: 1967 Prize of Moscow News
- Next: 1969 Prize of Moscow News

The 1968 Prize of Moscow News was the third edition of an international figure skating competition organized in Moscow, Soviet Union. It was held December 12–15, 1968. Medals were awarded in the disciplines of men's singles, ladies' singles, pair skating and ice dancing. Soviet skaters Sergei Chetverukhin and Elena Shcheglova won the singles categories. The Soviet Union swept the pairs' podium, led by Tamara Moskvina / Alexei Mishin, who defeated Irina Rodnina / Alexei Ulanov. East Germany's national champions, Annerose Baier / Eberhard Rüger, took the ice dancing title.

== Men ==
Rank	Name	Nation
1	Sergei Chetverukhin	Soviet Union
2		
3		
...		

== Ladies ==
Rank	Name	Nation
1	Elena Shcheglova	Soviet Union
2	Galina Grzhibovskaya	Soviet Union
3	Sonja Morgenstern	East Germany
4		
5	Christine Errath	East Germany
...		

== Pairs ==
Rank	Name	Nation
1	Tamara Moskvina / Alexei Mishin	Soviet Union
2	Irina Rodnina / Alexei Ulanov	Soviet Union
3	Galina Karelina / Georgi Proskurin	Soviet Union
...		

== Ice dancing ==
Rank	Name	Nation
1	Annerose Baier / Eberhard Rüger	East Germany
2	Tatiana Voitiuk / Viacheslav Zhigalin	Soviet Union
3		
...		
