= 1983 Prize of Moscow News =

- Date: November 23 – 27
- Season: 1983-84
- Location: Moscow

Champions
- Men's singles: Vladimir Kotin (URS)
- Ladies' singles: Kira Ivanova (URS)
- Pairs: Larisa Selezneva / Oleg Makarov (URS)
- Ice dance: Natalia Bestemianova / Andrei Bukin (URS)
- Previous: 1982 Prize of Moscow News
- Next: 1984 Prize of Moscow News

The 1983 Prize of Moscow News was the 18th edition of an international figure skating competition organized in Moscow, Soviet Union. It was held November 23–27, 1983. Medals were awarded in the disciplines of men's singles, ladies' singles, pair skating and ice dancing.

== Men ==
Rank	Name	Nation
1	Vladimir Kotin	Soviet Union
2	Gary Beacom	Canada
3	Alexandre Fadeev	Soviet Union
...		
6	Dennis Coi	Canada
...		
12	Stephen Carr	Australia
...		
15		

== Ladies ==
Rank	Name	Nation
1	Kira Ivanova	Soviet Union
2	Anna Kondrashova	Soviet Union
3	Natalia Lebedeva	Soviet Union
4	Anna Antonova	Soviet Union
5	Charlene Wong	Canada
6	Marina Serova	Soviet Union
...		

== Pairs ==
Rank	Name	Nation
1	Larisa Selezneva / Oleg Makarov	Soviet Union
2	Veronika Pershina / Marat Akbarov	Soviet Union
3	Elena Bechke / Valeri Kornienko	Soviet Union
...		
12	Danielle McGrath / Stephen Carr	Australia

== Ice dancing ==
Rank	Name	Nation
1	Natalia Bestemianova / Andrei Bukin	Soviet Union
2		
3		
4		
5	Natalia Annenko / Genrikh Sretenski	Soviet Union
6	Maya Usova / Alexander Zhulin	Soviet Union
...		
