= 1976 Prize of Moscow News =

- Date: December 8 – 12
- Season: 1976-77
- Location: Moscow

Champions
- Men's singles: Vladimir Kovalev (URS)
- Ladies' singles: Elena Vodorezova (URS)
- Pairs: Marina Cherkasova / Sergei Shakhrai (URS)
- Ice dance: Irina Moiseeva / Andrei Minenkov (URS)
- Previous: 1975 Prize of Moscow News
- Next: 1977 Prize of Moscow News

The 1976 Prize of Moscow News was the eleventh edition of an international figure skating competition organized in Moscow, Soviet Union. It was held December 8–12, 1976. Medals were awarded in the disciplines of men's singles, ladies' singles, pair skating and ice dancing.

== Men ==
Rank	Name	Nation
1	Vladimir Kovalev	Soviet Union
2	Yuri Ovchinikov	Soviet Union
3	Sergey Volkov	Soviet Union
4	Igor Bobrin	Soviet Union
...		

== Ladies ==
Rank	Name	Nation
1	Elena Vodorezova	Soviet Union
2	Ludmila Bakonina	Soviet Union
3	Zhanna Ilina	Soviet Union
4	Karin Enke	East Germany
5	Natalia Strelkova	Soviet Union
...		

== Pairs ==
Rank	Name	Nation
1	Marina Cherkasova / Sergei Shakhrai	Soviet Union
2	Nadezhda Gorshkova / Evgeni Shevalovski	Soviet Union
3	Manuela Mager / Uwe Bewersdorff	East Germany
4	Sherri Baier / Robin Cowan	Canada
5	Gabriele Beck / Jochen Stahl	West Germany
6	Marina Pestova / Mikhail Vazhenin	Soviet Union
...		
DNF	Irina Rodnina / Alexei Ulanov	Soviet Union
DNF	Irina Vorobieva / Aleksandr Vlasov	Soviet Union

== Ice dancing ==
Rank	Name	Nation
1	Irina Moiseeva / Andrei Minenkov	Soviet Union
2	Natalia Linichuk / Gennadi Karponosov	Soviet Union
3	Marina Zueva / Andrei Vitman	Soviet Union
4		
5		
6	Liliana Rehakova / Stanislav Drastich	Czechoslovakia
7	Lorna Wighton / John Dowding	Canada
...		
