= 1967 Prize of Moscow News =

- Date: December 14 – 17
- Season: 1967-68
- Location: Moscow

Champions
- Men's singles: Marian Filc (TCH)
- Ladies' singles: Zsuzsa Almassy (HUN)
- Pairs: Irina Rodnina / Alexei Ulanov (URS)
- Ice dance: Irina Grishkova / Viktor Ryzhkin (URS)
- Previous: 1966 Prize of Moscow News
- Next: 1968 Prize of Moscow News

The 1967 Prize of Moscow News was the second edition of an international figure skating competition organized held in Moscow, Soviet Union, from December 14 to 17, 1967. Medals were awarded in the disciplines of men's singles, ladies' singles, pair skating and ice dancing. Czechoslovakia's Marian Filc won the men's title, defeating the Soviet Union's Sergey Volkov and Alexander Vedenin. Hungary's Zsuzsa Almássy won gold in the ladies' event, finishing ahead of Soviets Elena Shcheglova and Galina Grzhibovskaya. The Soviet Union swept the pairs' podium, led by Irina Rodnina / Alexei Ulanov. Irina Grishkova / Viktor Ryzhkin, also from the Soviet Union, won the ice dancing title, finishing ahead of his former partner, Liudmila Pakhomova, and Alexander Gorshkov.

== Men ==
Rank	Name	Nation
1	Marian Filc	Czechoslovakia
2	Sergey Volkov	Soviet Union
3	Alexander Vedenin	Soviet Union
4	Vladimir Kurenbin	Soviet Union
5	Valeri Meshkov	Soviet Union
6	Jenő Ébert	Hungary
...		

== Ladies ==
Rank	Name	Nation
1	Zsuzsa Almássy	Hungary
2	Elena Shcheglova	Soviet Union
3	Galina Grzhibovskaya	Soviet Union
4	Eva Gasparcova	Czechoslovakia
5	Elena Alexandrova	Soviet Union
6	Eleonora Baricka	Czechoslovakia
...		

== Pairs ==
Rank	Name	Nation
1	Irina Rodnina / Alexei Ulanov	Soviet Union
2	Lyudmila Suslina / Alexander Tikhomirov	Soviet Union
3	Galina Karelina / Georgi Proskurin	Soviet Union
4	Liana Drahova / Peter Bartosiewicz	Czechoslovakia
5	Monika Hellbig / Axel Salzmann	East Germany
...		

== Ice dancing ==
Rank	Name	Nation
1	Irina Grishkova / Viktor Ryzhkin	Soviet Union
2	Liudmila Pakhomova / Alexander Gorshkov	Soviet Union
3	Dana Novotná / Jaromír Holan	Czechoslovakia
4	Annerose Baier / Eberhard Rüger	East Germany
...		
