= 1975 Prize of Moscow News =

- Date: November 26 – 30
- Season: 1975-76
- Location: Moscow

Champions
- Men's singles: Vladimir Kovalev (URS)
- Ladies' singles: Elena Vodorezova (URS)
- Pairs: Nadezhda Gorshkova / Evgeni Shevalovski (URS)
- Ice dance: Liudmila Pakhomova / Alexander Gorshkov (URS)
- Previous: 1974 Prize of Moscow News
- Next: 1976 Prize of Moscow News

The 1975 Prize of Moscow News was the tenth edition of an international figure skating competition organized in Moscow, Soviet Union. It was held November 26–30, 1975. Medals were awarded in the disciplines of men's singles, ladies' singles, pair skating and ice dancing.

== Men ==
Rank	Name	Nation
1	Vladimir Kovalev	Soviet Union
2	Yuri Ovchinikov	Soviet Union
3	Konstantin Kokora	Soviet Union
...		
9	Ken Polk	Canada
...		

== Ladies ==
Rank	Name	Nation
1	Elena Vodorezova	Soviet Union
2	Wendy Burge	United States
3	Karin Enke	East Germany
4	Ludmila Bakonina	Soviet Union
5	Hana Knapova	Czechoslovakia
6	Garnet Ostermeier	West Germany
...		

== Pairs ==
Rank	Name	Nation
1	Nadezhda Gorshkova / Evgeni Shevalovski	Soviet Union
2	Irina Vorobieva / Aleksandr Vlasov	Soviet Union
3	Marina Leonidova / Vladimir Bogolyubov	Soviet Union
...		
6	Katja Schubert / Knut Schubert	East Germany
...		

== Ice dancing ==
Rank	Name	Nation
1	Liudmila Pakhomova / Alexander Gorshkov	Soviet Union
2	Natalya Linichuk / Gennadi Karponosov	Soviet Union
3	Lilia Karavaeva / Viacheslav Zhigalin	Soviet Union
4		
5	Barbara Berezowski / David Porter	Canada
...		
