= 1979 Prize of Moscow News =

- Date: November 28 – December 1
- Season: 1979-80
- Location: Moscow

Champions
- Men's singles: Igor Bobrin (URS)
- Ladies' singles: Kira Ivanova (URS)
- Pairs: Irina Vorobieva / Igor Lisovski (URS)
- Ice dance: Natalia Linichuk / Gennadi Karponosov (URS)
- Previous: 1978 Prize of Moscow News
- Next: 1980 Prize of Moscow News

The 1979 Prize of Moscow News was the 14th edition of the Prize of Moscow News, an international figure skating competition organized in Moscow in the Soviet Union. It was held November 28 – December 1, 1979. Medals were awarded in the disciplines of men's singles, ladies' singles, pair skating and ice dancing.

== Men ==
Rank	Name	Nation
1	Igor Bobrin	Soviet Union
2	Vladimir Kotin	Soviet Union
3	Vladimir Rashetnov	Soviet Union
4	Falko Kirsten	East Germany
5	Grzegorz Głowania	Poland
6	Ludwik Jankowski	Poland
...		

== Ladies ==
Rank	Name	Nation
1	Kira Ivanova	Soviet Union
2	Natalia Strelkova	Soviet Union
3	Renata Baierova	Czechoslovakia
4	Marina Ignatova	Soviet Union
5	Deborah Albright	Canada
6	P. Snellman	Finland
...		

== Pairs ==
Rank	Name	Nation
1	Irina Vorobieva / Igor Lisovski	Soviet Union
2	Veronika Pershina / Marat Akbarov	Soviet Union
3	Zhanna Ilina / Aleksandr Vlasov	Soviet Union
4	Birgit Lorenz / Knut Schubert	East Germany
5	Barbara Underhill / Paul Martini	Canada
6	Elena Valova / Oleg Vasiliev	Soviet Union
...		

== Ice dancing ==
Rank	Name	Nation
1	Natalia Linichuk / Gennadi Karponosov	Soviet Union
2	Natalia Bestemianova / Andrei Bukin	Soviet Union
3	Natalia Karamysheva / Rostislav Sinitsyn	Soviet Union
4	Elena Garanina / Igor Zavozin	Soviet Union
5	Marina Zueva / Andrei Vitman	Soviet Union
6	Olga Volozhinskaya / Alexander Svinin	Soviet Union
7		
8	Gina Aucoin / Hans Peter Ponikau	Canada
9	Kelly Johnson / Kris Barber	Canada
...		
