= 1972 Prize of Moscow News =

- Date: December 09 – 13
- Season: 1972-73
- Location: Moscow

Champions
- Men's singles: Sergei Chetverukhin (URS)
- Ladies' singles: Cathy-Lee Irwin (CAN)
- Pairs: Irina Vorobieva / Alexander Vlasov (URS)
- Ice dance: Lyudmila Pakhomova / Alexander Gorshkov (URS)
- Previous: 1971 Prize of Moscow News
- Next: 1973 Prize of Moscow News

The 1972 Prize of Moscow News was the seventh edition of an international figure skating competition organized in Moscow, Soviet Union. It was held December 9–13, 1972. Medals were awarded in the disciplines of men's singles, ladies' singles, pair skating and ice dancing. Sergei Chetverukhin won the men's title for the third consecutive year. Canada's Cathy Lee Irwin took the ladies' title ahead of West Germany's Isabel de Navarre and the Soviet Union's Tatiana Oleneva. Irina Vorobieva / Alexander Vlasov defeated Olympic champions Ludmila Belousova / Oleg Protopopov for gold in the pairs' category. In the ice dancing category, world champions Lyudmila Pakhomova / Alexander Gorshkov won their fourth gold medal at the event.

== Men ==
Rank	Name	Nation
1	Sergei Chetverukhin	Soviet Union
2	Sergei Volgushev	Soviet Union
3	Bernd Wunderlich	East Germany
...		

== Ladies ==
Rank	Name	Nation
1	Cathy Lee Irwin	Canada
2	Isabel de Navarre	West Germany
3	Tatiana Oleneva	Soviet Union
...		

== Pairs ==
Rank	Name	Nation
1	Irina Vorobieva / Alexander Vlasov	Soviet Union
2	Ludmila Belousova / Oleg Protopopov	Soviet Union
3	Marina Leonidova / Vladimir Bogolyubov	Soviet Union
...		

== Ice dancing ==
Rank	Name	Nation
1	Lyudmila Pakhomova / Alexander Gorshkov	Soviet Union
2	Irina Moiseeva / Andrei Minenkov	Soviet Union
3	Natalia Linichuk / Gennadi Karponosov	Soviet Union
4	Marian Murray / Glenn Moore	Canada
...		
