= 1973 Prize of Moscow News =

1993 Prize of Moscow News
- Date: December 09 – 14
- Season: 1973-74
- Location: Moscow

Champions
- Men's singles: Vladimir Kovalev (URS)
- Ladies' singles: Gerti Schanderl (FRG)
- Pairs: Lyudmila Smirnova / Alexei Ulanov (URS)
- Ice dance: Natalia Linichuk / Gennadi Karponosov (URS)
- Previous: 1972 Prize of Moscow News
- Next: 1974 Prize of Moscow News

The 1973 Prize of Moscow News was the eighth edition of an international figure skating competition organized in Moscow, Soviet Union. It was held December 9–14, 1973. Medals were awarded in the disciplines of men's singles, ladies' singles, pair skating and ice dancing. The Soviet Union's Vladimir Kovalev, a world medalist, won the men's title for the first time, after three previous podium finishes. West Germany national champion Gerti Schanderl took the ladies' title ahead of Soviet skater Ludmila Bakonina. Soviets swept the pairs' podium, led by Olympic champion Alexei Ulanov and his second partner, Lyudmila Smirnova. The ice dancing title was won by Natalia Linichuk / Gennadi Karponosov, who would take the world bronze medal later in the season.

== Men ==
Rank	Name	Nation
1	Vladimir Kovalev	Soviet Union
2	Ronald Shaver	Canada
3	Igor Bobrin	Soviet Union
4	Igor Lisovsky	Soviet Union
5	Mario Liebers	East Germany
6	Konstantin Kokora	Soviet Union
...		

== Ladies ==
Rank	Name	Nation
1	Gerti Schanderl	West Germany
2	Ludmila Bakonina	Soviet Union
3	Marion Weber	East Germany
4	Steffi Knoll	East Germany
5	Tatiana Oleneva	Soviet Union
6	Hana Knapova	Czechoslovakia
...		

== Pairs ==
Rank	Name	Nation
1	Lyudmila Smirnova / Alexei Ulanov	Soviet Union
2	Natalia Dongauzer / Vasili Blagov	Soviet Union
3	Marina Leonidova / Vladimir Bogolyubov	Soviet Union
4	Natalia Ovchinnikova / Andrei Suraikin	Soviet Union
5	Elena Komarova / Alexander Volkov	Soviet Union
6	Katja Schubert / Knut Schubert	East Germany
...		

== Ice dancing ==
Rank	Name	Nation
1	Natalia Linichuk / Gennadi Karponosov	Soviet Union
2	Irina Moiseeva / Andrei Minenkov	Soviet Union
3	Svetlana Alexeeva / Alexander Boichuk	Soviet Union
4	Diana Skotnická / Martin Skotnický	Czechoslovakia
5	Halina Gordon / Wojciech Bankowski	Poland
6	Teresa Weyna / Piotr Bojańczyk	Poland
7	Marian Murray / Glenn Moore	Canada
...		
