= Marina Cherkasova (pair skater) =

Russian retired pair skater

Personal information
- Full name: Marina Evgenievna Cherkasova
- Born: 17 November 1964 (age 62) Moscow, Russian SFSR, Soviet Union

Figure skating career
- Country: Soviet Union
- Retired: 1982
Medal record
Representing Soviet Union
Pairs figure skating
Olympic Games
Silver medal – second place	1980 Lake Placid	Pairs
World Championships
Gold medal – first place	1980 Dortmund	Pairs
Silver medal – second place	1979 Vienna	Pairs
European Championships
Gold medal – first place	1979 Zagreb	Pairs
Silver medal – second place	1978 Strasbourg	Pairs
Silver medal – second place	1980 Gothenburg	Pairs
Bronze medal – third place	1977 Helsinki	Pairs
Bronze medal – third place	1981 Innsbruck	Pairs

Marina Evgenievna Cherkasova (Russian: Марина Евгеньевна Черкасова; born 17 November 1964) is a Russian retired pair skater. With Sergei Shakhrai, she won the 1979 European title at the age of 14. At 15, she was the 1980 Olympic silver medalist and 1980 World champion.

== Career ==
Cherkasova and Shakhrai trained in Moscow with Stanislav Zhuk. Their main rivals included fellow Soviets Irina Rodnina / Alexander Zaitsev, whom they never defeated, Irina Vorobieva / Igor Lisovsky, Marina Pestova / Stanislav Leonovich, and Veronika Pershina / Marat Akbarov.

Cherkasova and Shakhrai were 12 and 18 respectively when they were paired together. Initially, there was a 35 cm (1 ft 2 in) height difference between the pair, with Cherkasova 138 cm (4 ft 6 1/2 in) tall.

Cherkasova was 12 when the pair captured the bronze medal at their first European Championship in 1977; they also won the bronze at the Soviet Championships. Their height difference facilitated innovation in twist and lift elements; they became the first pair to perform a triple jump (the toe loop) at the Prize of Moscow News on 9 December 1977 and the quadruple twist lift in 1977. According to figure skating historian James R. Hines, their twist lift was possible due to their "enormous differences in their height and weight", leading the International Skating Union to adopt a rule that penalized pairs teams with a "serious imbalance" in their physical appearances. In 1978, they won the silver medal at the European Championships and again came in fourth place at Worlds.

In 1979, they won the European and Soviets titles, and came in second place at Worlds. By 1980 Cherkasova had grown 20 cm (8 in). The change affected their technical elements, but the pair managed to win silver at 1980 Europeans, silver at the 1980 Olympics, and gold at Worlds. At the age of 15 years, 93 days, Cherkasova was one of the youngest figure skating Olympic medalists.

Shakhrai's problems lifting his now 45 kg (99 lb) partner eventually resulted in them splitting up. By 1981, Cherkasova had grown so tall that Shakhrai could no longer effectively lift her. They missed the medal podium at the Worlds and finished in fourth place. They also came in third place at Europeans.

Cherkasova and Shakhrai skated together for another year, but "were less successful than they had been", and the Soviet federation eased them out of competition. Cherkasova was 19 years old and Shakhrai was 25. Cherkasova skated as a professional for a few years.

== Later life ==
In 1982, Cherkasova joined the Moscow Ice Ballet, where she met her husband. In 1986, they had a son, Vitaly, and a few years later, a daughter named Daria.

In the 1990s, she was a school teacher in Moscow and a figure skating coach in Italy. By 2000, she was a children's coach in Moscow.

== Competitive highlights ==
(with Shakhrai)

International
Event	76–77	77–78	78–79	79–80	80–81
Winter Olympics				2nd	
World Championships	4th	4th	2nd	1st	4th
European Championships	3rd	2nd	1st	2nd	3rd
Prize of Moscow News	1st				
National
Soviet Championships	3rd	1st	1st		3rd

== External sources ==
- Cherkasova and Shakhrai's free skate at the 1977 World Championship
