= 1987 Prize of Moscow News =

Figure skating competition

- Date: November 11 – 15
- Season: 1987-88
- Location: Moscow

Champions
- Men's singles: Alexandre Fadeev (URS)
- Ladies' singles: Cindy Bortz (USA)
- Pairs: Ekaterina Gordeeva / Sergei Grinkov (URS)
- Ice dance: Marina Klimova / Sergei Ponomarenko (URS)
- Previous: 1986 Prize of Moscow News
- Next: 1988 Prize of Moscow News

The 1987 Prize of Moscow News was the 22nd edition of an international figure skating competition organized in Moscow, Soviet Union. It was held November 11–15, 1987. Medals were awarded in the disciplines of men's singles, ladies' singles, pair skating and ice dancing. The men's title went to World champion Alexandre Fadeev, winning the Prize of Moscow News for the fourth time. Cindy Bortz, moving up to the senior level after winning the world junior title, won the ladies' category. Ekaterina Gordeeva / Sergei Grinkov, who would win the Olympic gold medal later in the season, took the pairs' title ahead of 1984 Olympic champions Elena Valova / Oleg Vasiliev. The ice dancing title was won by Marina Klimova / Sergei Ponomarenko, who would end their season with an Olympic silver medal.

== Men ==
Rank	Name	Nation
1	Alexandre Fadeev	Soviet Union
2	Daniel Doran	United States
3	Viktor Petrenko	Soviet Union
4	Matthew Hall	Canada
5	Frederic Lipka	France
6	Viktor Baryshevtsev	Soviet Union
7	Andrei Torosian	Soviet Union
8	Ralph Burghart	Austria
9	Yuriy Tsymbalyuk	Soviet Union
10	Dmitri Gromov	Soviet Union
...		

== Ladies ==
Rank	Name	Nation
1	Cindy Bortz	United States
2	Natalia Gorbenko	Soviet Union
3	Natalia Skrabnevskaya	Soviet Union
4	Pamela Giangualano	Canada
5	Larisa Zamotina	Soviet Union
6	Tatiana Andreeva	Soviet Union
7	Marina Tveritinova	Soviet Union
8	Yvonne Pokorny	Austria
9	Sachie Yuki	Japan
10	Paola Tosi	Italy
...		

== Pairs ==
Rank	Name	Nation
1	Ekaterina Gordeeva / Sergei Grinkov	Soviet Union
2	Elena Valova / Oleg Vasiliev	Soviet Union
3	Larisa Selezneva / Oleg Makarov	Soviet Union
4	Natalia Mishkutionok / Artur Dmitriev	Soviet Union
5	Elena Kvitchenko / Rashid Kadyrkaev	Soviet Union
6	Elena Bechke / Denis Petrov	Soviet Union
7	Peggy Schwarz / Alexander König	East Germany
8	Christine Hough / Doug Ladret	Canada
9	Elena Leonova / Gennadi Krasnitsky	Soviet Union
10	Lyudmila Koblova / Andrei Kalitin	Soviet Union
11	Calla Urbanski / Michael Blicharski	United States
12	Lisa Cushley / Neil Cushley	United Kingdom
13	Akiko Nogami / Yoichi Yamazaki	Japan

== Ice dancing ==
Rank	Name	Nation
1	Marina Klimova / Sergei Ponomarenko	Soviet Union
2	Maya Usova / Alexander Zhulin	Soviet Union
3	Natalia Annenko / Genrikh Sretenski	Soviet Union
...		
