= 1978 Prize of Moscow News =

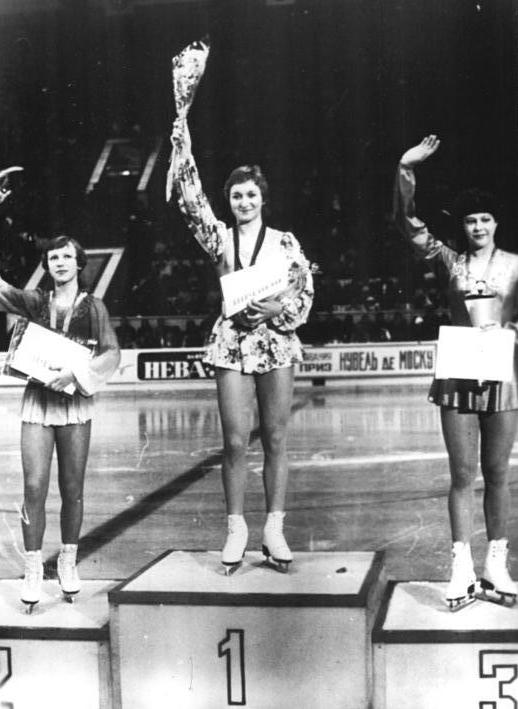
- The ladies' medalists
- Date: December 6 – 10
- Season: 1978-79
- Location: Moscow

Champions
- Men's singles: Konstantin Kokora (URS)
- Ladies' singles: Carola Weissenberg (GDR)
- Pairs: Marina Pestova / Stanislav Leonovich (URS)
- Ice dance: Irina Moiseeva / Andrei Minenkov (URS)
- Previous: 1977 Prize of Moscow News
- Next: 1979 Prize of Moscow News

The 1978 Prize of Moscow News was the 13th edition of the Prize of Moscow News, an international figure skating competition organized in Moscow in the Soviet Union. It was held December 6–10, 1978. Medals were awarded in the disciplines of men's singles, ladies' singles, pair skating and ice dancing.

== Men ==
Rank	Name	Nation
1	Konstantin Kokora	Soviet Union
2	Igor Bobrin	Soviet Union
3	Mario Liebers	East Germany
...		

== Ladies ==
Rank	Name	Nation
1	Carola Weissenberg	East Germany
2	Kira Ivanova	Soviet Union
3	Marina Ignatova	Soviet Union
4	Natalia Strelkova	Soviet Union
5		
6	Svetlana Frantsuzova	Soviet Union
...		

== Pairs ==
Rank	Name	Nation
1	Marina Pestova / Stanislav Leonovich	Soviet Union
2	Nelli Chervotkina / Viktor Teslia	Soviet Union
3	Irina Vorobieva / Igor Lisovski	Soviet Union
4	Kornelia Hauffe / Kersten Bellmann	East Germany
...		

== Ice dancing ==
Rank	Name	Nation
1	Irina Moiseeva / Andrei Minenkov	Soviet Union
2	Elena Garanina / Igor Zavozin	Soviet Union
3	Marina Zueva / Andrei Witman	Soviet Union
4	Natalia Bestemianova / Andrei Bukin	Soviet Union
5	Natalia Karamysheva / Rostislav Sinitsyn	Soviet Union
...		
12	Marie McNeill / Rob McCall	Canada
...		
