= 1986 Prize of Moscow News =

- Date: December 3 – 7
- Season: 1986-87
- Location: Moscow

Champions
- Men's singles: Vladimir Kotin (URS)
- Ladies' singles: Kira Ivanova (URS)
- Pairs: Elena Kvitchenko / Rashid Kadyrkaev (URS)
- Ice dance: Marina Klimova / Sergei Ponomarenko (URS)
- Previous: 1985 Prize of Moscow News
- Next: 1987 Prize of Moscow News

The 1986 Prize of Moscow News was the 21st edition of an international figure skating competition organized in Moscow, Soviet Union. It was held December 3–7, 1986. Medals were awarded in the disciplines of men's singles, ladies' singles, pair skating and ice dancing. The Soviet Union swept three podiums. The men's title went to European silver medalist Vladimir Kotin. Olympic bronze medalist Kira Ivanova won the ladies' category ahead of Jill Trenary from the United States. Marina Klimova / Sergei Ponomarenko, also Olympic bronze medalists, took the ice dancing title.

== Men ==
Rank	Name	Nation
1	Vladimir Kotin	Soviet Union
2	Vitali Egorov	Soviet Union
3	Vladimir Petrenko	Soviet Union
4	Paul Wylie	United States
5	Nils Köpp	East Germany
6	Andrei Torosian	Soviet Union
7	Ralph Burghart	Austria
8	Brad MacLean	Canada
9	Dmitri Gromov	Soviet Union
10	Przemysław Noworyta	Poland
...		

== Ladies ==
Rank	Name	Nation
1	Kira Ivanova	Soviet Union
2	Jill Trenary	United States
3	Anna Kondrashova	Soviet Union
4	Joanne Conway	United Kingdom
5	Patricia Neske	West Germany
6	Tatiana Andreeva	Soviet Union
7	Larisa Zamotina	Soviet Union
8	Natalia Gorbenko	Soviet Union
9	Elena Taranenko	Soviet Union
10	Misashi Kashiwagi	Japan
11	Yvonne Pokorny	Austria
12	Sabine Contini	Italy
...		

== Pairs ==
Rank	Name	Nation
1	Elena Kvitchenko / Rashid Kadyrkaev	Soviet Union
2	Elena Bechke / Valeri Kornienko	Soviet Union
3	Lyudmila Koblova / Andrei Kalitin	Soviet Union
4	Katy Keeley / Joseph Mero	United States
5	Katrin Kanitz / Tobias Schröter	East Germany
6	Yulia Bystrova / Alexander Tarasov	Soviet Union
7	Elena Gud / Evgeni Koltun	Soviet Union
8	Marina Eltsova / Sergei Zaitsev	Soviet Union
9	Peggy Schwarz / Alexander König	East Germany
...		

== Ice dancing ==
Rank	Name	Nation
1	Marina Klimova / Sergei Ponomarenko	Soviet Union
2	Natalia Annenko / Genrich Sretenski	Soviet Union
3	Maya Usova / Alexander Zhulin	Soviet Union
4	Svetlana Liapina / Gorsha Sur	Soviet Union
5	Larisa Fedorinova / Evgeni Platov	Soviet Union
6	Dominique Yvon / Frederic Palluel	France
7	Corinne Paliard / Didier Courtois	France
8	Erica Davenport / Mark Mitchell	Canada
9	Julia Linney / Graham Linney	United Kingdom
10	Andrea Weppelmann / Henrik Schamberger	West Germany
11	Viera Řeháková / Ivan Havránek	Czechoslovakia
...		
