= 1980 Prize of Moscow News =

- Date: December 10 – 14
- Season: 1980-81
- Location: Moscow

Champions
- Men's singles: Igor Bobrin (URS)
- Ladies' singles: Svetlana Frantsuzova (URS)
- Pairs: Irina Vorobieva / Igor Lisovski (URS)
- Ice dance: Natalia Linichuk / Gennadi Karponosov (URS)
- Previous: 1979 Prize of Moscow News
- Next: 1981 Prize of Moscow News

The 1980 Prize of Moscow News was the 15th edition of the Prize of Moscow News, an international figure skating competition organized in Moscow in the Soviet Union. It was held December 10–14, 1980. Medals were awarded in the disciplines of men's singles, ladies' singles, pair skating and ice dancing.

== Men ==
Rank	Name	Nation
1	Igor Bobrin	Soviet Union
2	Konstantin Kokora	Soviet Union
3	Vladimir Kotin	Soviet Union
4	Jozef Sabovcik	Czechoslovakia
5	Alexander Fadeev	Soviet Union
...		

== Ladies ==
Rank	Name	Nation
1	Svetlana Frantsuzova	Soviet Union
2	Janina Wirth	East Germany
3	Anna Kondrashova	Soviet Union
4	Alla Fomicheva	Soviet Union
...		

== Pairs ==
Rank	Name	Nation
1	Irina Vorobieva / Igor Lisovski	Soviet Union
2	Nelli Chervotkina / Viktor Teslia	Soviet Union
3	Elena Valova / Oleg Vasiliev	Soviet Union
...		

== Ice dancing ==
Rank	Name	Nation
1	Natalia Linichuk / Gennadi Karponosov	Soviet Union
2	Irina Moiseeva / Andrei Minenkov	Soviet Union
3	Natalia Bestemianova / Andrei Bukin	Soviet Union
4		
5	Natalia Karamysheva / Rostislav Sinitsyn	Soviet Union
...		
