= Sergei Shakhrai =

Russian retired pair skater

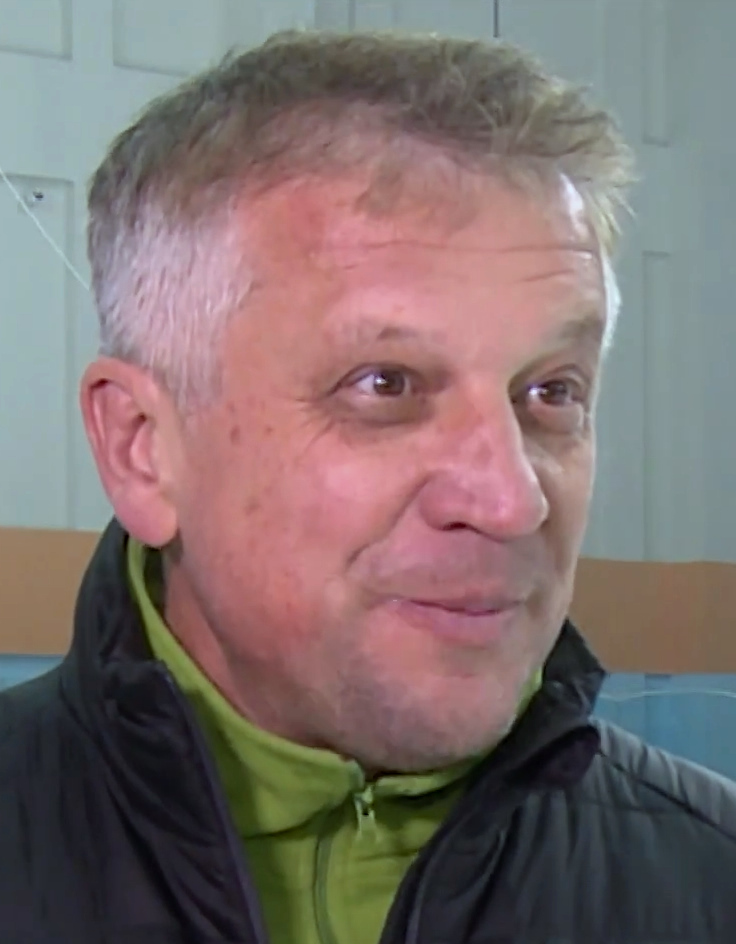
- Shakhrai in 2018

Personal information
- Full name: Sergei Semyonovich Shakhrai
- Born: 28 June 1958 (age 68) Soviet Union

Figure skating career
- Country: Soviet Union
Medal record
Representing Soviet Union
Pairs' Figure skating
Olympic Games
Silver medal – second place	1980 Lake Placid	Pairs
World Championships
Gold medal – first place	1980 Dortmund	Pairs
Silver medal – second place	1979 Vienna	Pairs
European Championships
Gold medal – first place	1979 Zagreb	Pairs
Silver medal – second place	1978 Strasbourg	Pairs
Silver medal – second place	1980 Gothenburg	Pairs
Bronze medal – third place	1977 Helsinki	Pairs
Bronze medal – third place	1981 Innsbruck	Pairs

Sergei Semyonovich Shakhrai (Russian: Серге́й Семёнович Шахрай; born 28 June 1958) is a Russian retired pair skater. With partner Marina Cherkasova, he is the 1980 Olympic silver medalist, 1980 World champion, and 1979 European champion.

== Career ==
Cherkasova and Shakhrai trained in Moscow with Stanislav Zhuk. Their main rivals included fellow Soviets Irina Rodnina / Alexander Zaitsev, whom they never defeated, Irina Vorobieva / Igor Lisovsky, Marina Pestova / Stanislav Leonovich, and Veronika Pershina / Marat Akbarov.

Cherkasova and Shakhrai were 12 and 18 respectively when they were paired together. Initially, there was a 35 cm (1 ft 2 in) height difference between the pair, with Cherkasova only 138 cm (4 ft 6 1/2 in) tall.

With his 12-year-old partner, he won the bronze medal at their first European Championship in 1977; they also won the bronze at the Soviet Championships. Their height difference facilitated innovation in twist and lift elements; they became the first pair to perform a triple jump (the toe loop) at the Prize of Moscow News on 9 December 1977 and the quadruple twist lift in 1977. According to figure skating historian James R. Hines, their twist lift was possible due to their "enormous differences in their height and weight", leading the International Skating Union to adopt a rule that penalized pairs teams with a "serious imbalance" in their physical appearances. In 1978, they won the silver medal at the European Championships and again came in fourth place at Worlds.

In 1979, they won the European and Soviet titles, and came in second place at Worlds. By 1980 Cherkasova had grown 20 cm (8 in). The change affected their technical elements, but the pair managed to win silver at 1980 Europeans, silver at the 1980 Olympics, and gold at Worlds. Cherkasova was only 15 years old when she competed at the Olympics, while Shakhrai was 21.

Shakhrai's problems lifting his now 45 kg (99 lb) partner eventually resulted in them splitting up. By 1981, Cherkasova had grown so tall that Shakhrai could no longer effectively lift her. They missed the medal podium at the Worlds and finished in fourth place. They also came in third place at Europeans.

Cherkasova and Shakhrai skated together for another year, but "were less successful than they had been", and the Soviet federation eased them out of competition. As of November 2016, Shakhrai was working as an ice skating coach in Australia. He coached the pair of Olga Neizvestnaya & Sergei Hudyakov to a bronze medal at the 1984 World Junior Figure Skating Championships.

== Competitive highlights ==
(with Cherkasova)

International
Event	76–77	77–78	78–79	79–80	80–81
Winter Olympics				2nd	
World Championships	4th	4th	2nd	1st	4th
European Championships	3rd	2nd	1st	2nd	3rd
Prize of Moscow News	1st				
International
Soviet Championships	3rd	1st	1st		3rd

== External sources ==
- Cherkasova and Shakhrai's free skate at the 1977 World Championship
