= 1974 Prize of Moscow News =

- Date: December 7 – 11
- Season: 1974-75
- Location: Moscow

Champions
- Men's singles: Vladimir Kovalev (URS)
- Ladies' singles: Lynn Nightingale (CAN)
- Pairs: Nadezhda Gorshkova / Evgeni Shevalovski (URS)
- Ice dance: Lyudmila Pakhomova / Alexander Gorshkov (URS)
- Previous: 1973 Prize of Moscow News
- Next: 1975 Prize of Moscow News

The 1974 Prize of Moscow News was the ninth edition of an international figure skating competition organized in Moscow, Soviet Union. It was held December 7–11, 1974. Medals were awarded in the disciplines of men's singles, ladies' singles, pair skating and ice dancing.

== Men ==
| Rank | Name | Nation |
|---|---|---|
| 1 | Vladimir Kovalev | Soviet Union |
| 2 | Sergey Volkov | Soviet Union |
| 3 | Minoru Sano | Japan |
| 4 | Yuri Ovchinnikov | Soviet Union |
| 5 | Igor Bobrin | Soviet Union |
| 6 | Hermann Schulz | East Germany |
| ... | | |

== Ladies ==
| Rank | Name | Nation |
|---|---|---|
| 1 | Lynn Nightingale | Canada |
| 2 | Ludmila Bakonina | Soviet Union |
| 3 | Petra Wagner | West Germany |
| 4 | Julie McKinstry | United States |
| ... | | |

== Pairs ==
| Rank | Name | Nation |
|---|---|---|
| 1 | Nadezhda Gorshkova / Evgeni Shevalovski | Soviet Union |
| 2 | Kerstin Stolfig / Veit Kempe | East Germany |
| 3 | Katja Schubert / Knut Schubert | East Germany |
| ... | | |

== Ice dancing ==
| Rank | Name | Nation |
|---|---|---|
| 1 | Liudmila Pakhomova / Alexander Gorshkov | Soviet Union |
| 2 | Irina Moiseeva / Andrei Minenkov | Soviet Union |
| 3 | Teresa Weyna / Piotr Bojanczyk | Poland |
| 4 | Lilia Karavaeva / Viacheslav Zhigalin | Soviet Union |
| 5 | Barbara Berezowski / David Porter | Canada |
| 6 | | |
| 7 | Eva Peštová / Jiří Pokorný | Czechoslovakia |
| ... | | |
