= 1982 Prize of Moscow News =

- Date: December 1 – 5
- Season: 1982-83
- Location: Moscow

Champions
- Men's singles: Alexander Fadeev (URS)
- Ladies' singles: Kira Ivanova (URS)
- Pairs: Veronika Pershina / Marat Akbarov (URS)
- Ice dance: Natalia Bestemianova / Andrei Bukin (URS)
- Previous: 1981 Prize of Moscow News
- Next: 1983 Prize of Moscow News

The 1982 Prize of Moscow News was the 17th edition of an international figure skating competition organized in Moscow, Soviet Union. It was held December 1–5, 1982. Medals were awarded in the disciplines of men's singles, ladies' singles, pair skating and ice dancing.

== Men ==
| Rank | Name | Nation |
|---|---|---|
| 1 | Alexander Fadeev | Soviet Union |
| 2 | Vladimir Kotin | Soviet Union |
| 3 | Josef Sabovcik | Czechoslovakia |
| 4 | Leonid Kaznakov | Soviet Union |
| 5 | Gary Beacom | Canada |
| ... | | |
| 9 | Dennis Coi | Canada |
| ... | | |

== Ladies ==
| Rank | Name | Nation |
|---|---|---|
| 1 | Kira Ivanova | Soviet Union |
| 2 | Anna Kondrashova | Soviet Union |
| 3 | Anna Antonova | Soviet Union |
| 4 | Janina Wirth | East Germany |
| 5 | Andrea Hall | Canada |
| 6 | Marina Serova | Soviet Union |
| 7 | | |
| 8 | Elizabeth Manley | Canada |
| ... | | |

== Pairs ==
| Rank | Name | Nation |
|---|---|---|
| 1 | Veronika Pershina / Marat Akbarov | Soviet Union |
| 2 | Larisa Selezneva / Oleg Makarov | Soviet Union |
| 3 | Elena Valova / Oleg Vasiliev | Soviet Union |
| ... | | |

== Ice dancing ==
| Rank | Name | Nation |
|---|---|---|
| 1 | Natalia Bestemianova / Andrei Bukin | Soviet Union |
| 2 | Olga Volozhinskaya / Alexander Svinin | Soviet Union |
| 3 | Marina Klimova / Sergei Ponomarenko | Soviet Union |
| 4 | Natalia Karamysheva / Rostislav Sinitsyn | Soviet Union |
| ... | | |
| 8 | Kelly Johnson / John Thomas | Canada |
| ... | | |
