= 1981 Prize of Moscow News =

- Date: December 9 – 13
- Season: 1981-82
- Location: Moscow

Champions
- Men's singles: Vladimir Kotin (URS)
- Ladies' singles: Kay Thomson (CAN)
- Pairs: Larisa Selezneva / Oleg Makarov (URS)
- Ice dance: Natalia Bestemianova / Andrei Bukin (URS)
- Previous: 1980 Prize of Moscow News
- Next: 1982 Prize of Moscow News

The 1981 Prize of Moscow News was the 16th edition of the Prize of Moscow News, an international figure skating competition organized in Moscow in the Soviet Union. It was held December 9–13, 1981. Medals were awarded in the disciplines of men's singles, ladies' singles, pair skating and ice dancing.

== Men ==
Rank	Name	Nation
1	Vladimir Kotin	Soviet Union
2	Igor Bobrin	Soviet Union
3	Vitali Egorov	Soviet Union
?	Konstantin Kokora	Soviet Union
?	Ivan Kralik	Czech Republic
?	Christopher Howarth	United Kingdom
?	Grzegorz Głowania	Poland
?	Thomas Hlavik	Austria
?	Antti Kontiola	Finland
...		
16	Boyko Alexiev	Bulgaria

== Ladies ==
Rank	Name	Nation
1	Kay Thomson	Canada
2	Kira Ivanova	Soviet Union
3	Kerstin Wolf	East Germany
4	Anna Antonova	Soviet Union
5	Anna Kondrashova	Soviet Union
6	Alla Fomicheva	Soviet Union
7		
8	Beverly Dempsey	United Kingdom
9	Kathryn Osterberg	Canada
10	Hana Vesela	Czech Republic
11		
12	Maae Mima	Japan
13	Barbara Knotkova	Czech Republic
14	Simone Koch	East Germany
15	Izumi Aotani	Japan
16	Janna Bazuin	Netherlands
17	Titiana Rosastini	Italy
18	Tzvetanka Steankova	Bulgaria

== Pairs ==
Rank	Name	Nation
1	Larisa Selezneva / Oleg Makarov	Soviet Union
2	Veronika Pershina / Marat Akbarov	Soviet Union
3	Lorri Baier / Lloyd Eisler	Canada
4		
5	Birgit Lorenz / Knut Schubert	East Germany
6	Rebecca Gough / Mark Rowsom	Canada
...		

== Ice dancing ==
Rank	Name	Nation
1	Natalia Bestemianova / Andrei Bukin	Soviet Union
2	Irina Moiseeva / Andrei Minenkov	Soviet Union
3	Olga Volozhinskaya / Alexander Svinin	Soviet Union
...		
11	Karen Taylor / Robert Burk	Canada
12	Karyn Garossino / Rod Garossino	Canada
