= 1988 Prize of Moscow News =

- Date: November 2 – 6
- Season: 1988-89
- Location: Leningrad

Champions
- Men's singles: Vladimir Petrenko (URS)
- Ladies' singles: Tonya Harding (USA)
- Pairs: Natalia Mishkutenok / Artur Dmitriev (URS)
- Ice dance: Marina Klimova / Sergei Ponomarenko (URS)
- Previous: 1987 Prize of Moscow News
- Next: 1990 Prize of Moscow News

The 1988 Prize of Moscow News was the 23rd edition of an international figure skating competition organized in Leningrad, Soviet Union. It was held November 2–6, 1988. Medals were awarded in the disciplines of men's singles, ladies' singles, pair skating and ice dancing. Soviet skaters swept the men's podium, led by Vladimir Petrenko. American Tonya Harding won the ladies' title ahead of Natalia Lebedeva from the Soviet Union. Soviets Natalia Mishkutenok / Artur Dmitriev, who would medal at the European Championships later in the season, took the pairs' title ahead of their compatriots, Elena Bechke / Denis Petrov, who would end their season with the world bronze medal. Olympic silver medalists Marina Klimova / Sergei Ponomarenko won the ice dancing title for the third consecutive year.

== Men ==
Rank	Name	Nation
1	Vladimir Petrenko	Soviet Union
2	Yuriy Tsymbalyuk	Soviet Union
3	Alexandre Fadeev	Soviet Union
4	Doug Mattis	United States
5	Dmitri Gromov	Soviet Union
6	Andrei Torosian	Soviet Union
7	Éric Millot	France
8	Viktor Baryshevtsev	Soviet Union
9	Michael Shmerkin	Soviet Union
10		
11	Brent Frank	Canada

== Ladies ==
Rank	Name	Nation
1	Tonya Harding	United States
2	Natalia Lebedeva	Soviet Union
3	Natalia Gorbenko	Soviet Union
4	Anna Kondrashova	Soviet Union
5	Simone Koch	East Germany
6	Natalia Skrabnevskaya	Soviet Union
7	Marina Tveritinova	Soviet Union
8	Elena Taranenko	Soviet Union
9	Suda Atsuko	Japan
10	Paola Tosi	Italy
..		
15	Angie Folk	Canada
..		

== Pairs ==
Rank	Name	Nation
1	Natalia Mishkutenok / Artur Dmitriev	Soviet Union
2	Elena Bechke / Denis Petrov	Soviet Union
3	Marina Eltsova / Sergei Zaitsev	Soviet Union
4	Elena Kvitchenko / Rashid Kadyrkaev	Soviet Union
5	Evgenia Shishkova / Vadim Naumov	Soviet Union
6	Lyudmila Koblova / Andrei Kalitin	Soviet Union
7	Evgenia Chernyshova / Dmitri Sukhanov	Soviet Union
8	Michelle Menzies / Kevin Wheeler	Canada
9	Ines Müller / Ingo Steuer	East Germany
...		

== Ice dancing ==
Rank	Name	Nation
1	Marina Klimova / Sergei Ponomarenko	Soviet Union
2	Larisa Fedorinova / Evgeni Platov	Soviet Union
3	Ilona Melnichenko / Gennadi Kaskov	Soviet Union
4	Oksana Grischuk / Alexander Chichkov	Soviet Union
5	Penny Mann / Richard Perkins	Canada
6	Jacqueline Petr / Mark Janoschak	Canada
7	Irina Stavroskaia / Valentin Kadzevich	Soviet Union
8	Tracey Sniadich / Leif Erickson	United States
...		
