= Prize of Moscow News =

Soviet international figure skating competition

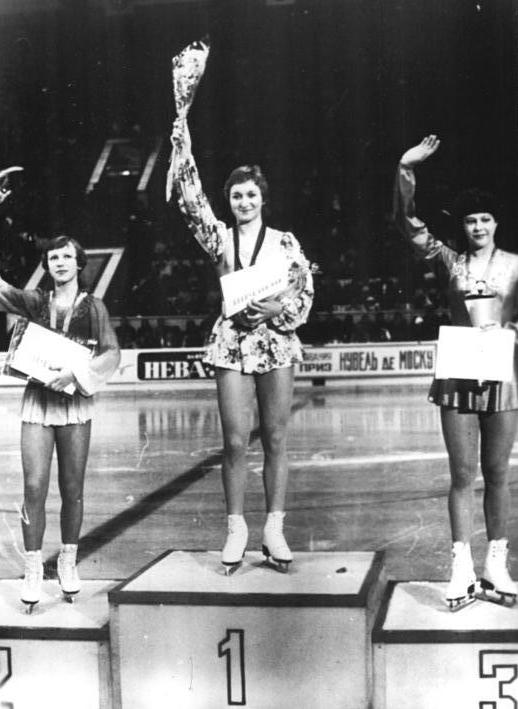
Prize of Moscow News

The Prize of Moscow News (Russian: Приз газеты «Московские новости»), also known as the Moscow Skate, Nouvelles de Moscou, and the Moscow News Trophy, was an international, senior-level figure skating competition held in the Soviet Union from 1966 to 1990 (excluding 1989, in 1990 was an international competition for the Prizes of the Gosteleradio USSR in Odessa, which became the legal successor of Prize of Moscow News competition). It was held annually in Moscow in December and effectively was the predecessor to the Cup of Russia ISU Grand Prix of Figure Skating event. The winners received a "Crystal Skate" statuette.

== Medalists ==
=== Men ===
Men's medalists
| Year | Gold | Silver | Bronze | Refs |
|---|---|---|---|---|
| 1966 | (Czechoslovakia) Ondrej Nepela | (East Germany) Günter Zöller | (Soviet Union) Vladimir Kurenbin | |
| 1967 | (Czechoslovakia) Marian Filc | (Soviet Union) Sergei Volkov | (Soviet Union) Alexander Vedenin | |
| 1968 | (Soviet Union) Sergei Chetverukhin | (Soviet Union) Sergei Volkov | (Soviet Union) Vladimir Kurenbin | |
| 1969 | (Soviet Union) Sergei Volkov | (Soviet Union) Vladimir Kovalev | (Soviet Union) Yuri Ovchinnikov | |
| 1970 | (Soviet Union) Sergei Chetverukhin | (Soviet Union) Sergei Volkov | (Soviet Union) Vladimir Kovalev | |
| 1971 | (Soviet Union) Sergei Chetverukhin | (Soviet Union) Vladimir Kovalev | (Soviet Union) Sergei Volkov | |
| 1972 | (Soviet Union) Sergei Chetverukhin | (Soviet Union) Sergei Volgushev | (East Germany) Bernd Wunderlich | |
| 1973 | (Soviet Union) Vladimir Kovalev | (Canada) Ron Shaver | (Soviet Union) Igor Bobrin | |
| 1974 | (Soviet Union) Vladimir Kovalev | (Soviet Union) Sergei Volkov | (Japan) Minoru Sano | |
| 1975 | (Soviet Union) Vladimir Kovalev | (Soviet Union) Sergei Volkov | (Soviet Union) Konstantin Kokora | |
| 1976 | (Soviet Union) Vladimir Kovalev | (Soviet Union) Yuri Ovchinnikov | (Soviet Union) Sergei Volkov | |
| 1977 | (Soviet Union) Yuri Ovchinnikov | (Soviet Union) Sergei Volkov | (Soviet Union) Igor Bobrin | |
| 1978 | (Soviet Union) Konstantin Kokora | (Soviet Union) Igor Bobrin | (East Germany) Mario Liebers | |
| 1979 | (Soviet Union) Igor Bobrin | (Soviet Union) Vladimir Kotin | (Soviet Union) Vladimir Raschetnov | |
| 1980 | (Soviet Union) Igor Bobrin | (Soviet Union) Konstantin Kokora | (Soviet Union) Vladimir Kotin | |
| 1981 | (Soviet Union) Vladimir Kotin | (Soviet Union) Igor Bobrin | (Soviet Union) Vitali Egorov | |
| 1982 | (Soviet Union) Alexander Fadeev | (Soviet Union) Vladimir Kotin | (Czechoslovakia) Jozef Sabovčík | |
| 1983 | (Soviet Union) Vladimir Kotin | (Canada) Gary Beacom | (Soviet Union) Alexander Fadeev | |
| 1984 | (Soviet Union) Alexander Fadeev | (Soviet Union) Vladimir Kotin | (Soviet Union) Viktor Petrenko | |
| 1985 | (Soviet Union) Alexander Fadeev | (Soviet Union) Vladimir Kotin | (Soviet Union) Vitali Egorov | |
| 1986 | (Soviet Union) Vladimir Kotin | (Soviet Union) Vitali Egorov | (Soviet Union) Vladimir Petrenko | |
| 1987 | (Soviet Union) Alexander Fadeev | (United States) Daniel Doran | (Soviet Union) Vladimir Petrenko | |
| 1988 | (Soviet Union) Vladimir Petrenko | (Soviet Union) Yuriy Tsymbalyuk | (Soviet Union) Alexander Fadeev | |
| 1989 | not held | | | |
| 1990 | (Soviet Union) Alexei Urmanov | (Soviet Union) Mikhail Shmerkin | (Soviet Union) Oleg Tataurov | |

=== Ladies ===
Ladies' medalists
| Year | Gold | Silver | Bronze | Refs |
|---|---|---|---|---|
| 1966 | (East Germany) Martina Clausner | (Hungary) Zsuzsa Szentmiklossy | (East Germany) Sybille Stolfig | |
| 1967 | (Hungary) Zsuzsa Almássy | (Soviet Union) Elena Shcheglova | (Soviet Union) Galina Grzhibovskaya | |
| 1968 | (Soviet Union) Elena Shcheglova | (Soviet Union) Galina Grzhibovskaya | (East Germany) Sonja Morgenstern | |
| 1969 | (Soviet Union) Elena Shcheglova | (Soviet Union) Elena Alexandrova | (East Germany) Simone Gräfe | |
| 1970 | (Soviet Union) Marina Titova | (East Germany) Simone Gräfe | (West Germany) Gundi Niesen | |
| 1971 | (Soviet Union) Marina Titova | (Soviet Union) Elena Kotova | (East Germany) Steffi Knoll | |
| 1972 | (Canada) Cathy-Lee Irwin | (West Germany) Isabel de Navarre | (Soviet Union) Tatiana Oleneva | |
| 1973 | (West Germany) Gerti Schanderl | (Soviet Union) Liudmila Bakonina | (East Germany) Marion Weber | |
| 1974 | (Canada) Lynn Nightingale | (Soviet Union) Liudmila Bakonina | (West Germany) Petra Wagner | |
| 1975 | (Soviet Union) Elena Vodorezova | (United States) Wendy Burge | (East Germany) Karin Enke | |
| 1976 | (Soviet Union) Elena Vodorezova | (Soviet Union) Liudmila Bakonina | (Soviet Union) Zhanna Ilina | |
| 1977 | (Soviet Union) Natalia Strelkova | (Soviet Union) Zhanna Ilina | (Soviet Union) Marina Ignatova | |
| 1978 | (East Germany) Carola Weißenberg | (Soviet Union) Kira Ivanova | (Soviet Union) Marina Ignatova | |
| 1979 | (Soviet Union) Kira Ivanova | (Soviet Union) Natalia Strelkova | (Czechoslovakia) Renata Baierová | |
| 1980 | (Soviet Union) Svetlana Frantsuzova | (East Germany) Janina Wirth | (Soviet Union) Anna Kondrashova | |
| 1981 | (Canada) Kay Thomson | (Soviet Union) Kira Ivanova | (East Germany) Kerstin Wolf | |
| 1982 | (Soviet Union) Kira Ivanova | (Soviet Union) Anna Kondrashova | (Soviet Union) Anna Antonova | |
| 1983 | (Soviet Union) Kira Ivanova | (Soviet Union) Anna Kondrashova | (Soviet Union) Natalia Lebedeva | |
| 1984 | (Soviet Union) Kira Ivanova | (Soviet Union) Natalia Lebedeva | (Soviet Union) Anna Kondrashova | |
| 1985 | (United States) Caryn Kadavy | (Soviet Union) Anna Kondrashova | (Soviet Union) Natalia Lebedeva | |
| 1986 | (Soviet Union) Kira Ivanova | (United States) Jill Trenary | (Soviet Union) Anna Kondrashova | |
| 1987 | (United States) Cindy Bortz | (Soviet Union) Natalia Gorbenko | (Soviet Union) Natalia Skrabnevskaya | |
| 1988 | (United States) Tonya Harding | (Soviet Union) Natalia Lebedeva | (Soviet Union) Natalia Gorbenko | |
| 1989 | not held | | | |
| 1990 | (Soviet Union) Olga Markova | (United States) Staci Rutkowski | (Soviet Union) Liudmila Ivanova | |

=== Pairs ===
Pairs medalists
| Year | Gold | Silver | Bronze | Refs |
|---|---|---|---|---|
| 1966 | (Soviet Union) Tamara Moskvina / Alexei Mishin | (Soviet Union) Tatiana Sharanova / Anatoli Evdokimov | (Soviet Union) Liudmila Smirnova / Andrei Suraikin | |
| 1967 | (Soviet Union) Irina Rodnina / Alexei Ulanov | (Soviet Union) Lyudmila Suslina / Alexander Tikhomirov | (Soviet Union) Galina Karelina / Georgi Proskurin | |
| 1968 | (Soviet Union) Tamara Moskvina / Alexei Mishin | (Soviet Union) Irina Rodnina / Alexei Ulanov | (Soviet Union) Galina Karelina / Georgi Proskurin | |
| 1969 | (Soviet Union) Irina Rodnina / Alexei Ulanov | (Soviet Union) Liudmila Smirnova / Andrei Suraikin | (Soviet Union) Tatiana Sharanova / Anatoli Evdokimov | |
| 1970 | (Soviet Union) Liudmila Smirnova / Andrei Suraikin | (Soviet Union) Galina Karelina / Georgi Proskurin | (Soviet Union) Ludmila Belousova / Oleg Protopopov | |
| 1971 | (Soviet Union) Ludmila Belousova / Oleg Protopopov | (Soviet Union) Liudmila Smirnova / Andrei Suraikin | (Soviet Union) Galina Karelina / Georgi Proskurin | |
| 1972 | (Soviet Union) Irina Vorobieva / Alexander Vlasov | (Soviet Union) Ludmila Belousova / Oleg Protopopov | (Soviet Union) Marina Leonidova / Vladimir Bogolyubov | |
| 1973 | (Soviet Union) Liudmila Smirnova / Alexei Ulanov | (Soviet Union) Natalia Dongauzer / Vasili Blagov | (Soviet Union) Marina Leonidova / Vladimir Bogolyubov | |
| 1974 | (Soviet Union) Nadezhda Gorshkova / Evgeni Shevalovski | (East Germany) Kerstin Stolfig / Veit Kempe | (East Germany) Katia Schubert / Knut Schubert | |
| 1975 | (Soviet Union) Nadezhda Gorshkova / Evgeni Shevalovski | (Soviet Union) Irina Vorobieva / Alexander Vlasov | (Soviet Union) Marina Leonidova / Vladimir Bogolyubov | |
| 1976 | (Soviet Union) Marina Cherkasova / Sergei Shakhrai | (Soviet Union) Nadezhda Gorshkova / Evgeni Shevalovski | (East Germany) Manuela Mager / Uwe Bewersdorf | |
| 1977 | (Soviet Union) Marina Cherkasova / Sergei Shakhrai | (Soviet Union) Nadezhda Gorshkova / Evgeni Shevalovski | (Soviet Union) Marina Pestova / Stanislav Leonovich | |
| 1978 | (Soviet Union) Marina Pestova / Stanislav Leonovich | (Soviet Union) Nelli Chervotkina / Viktor Teslia | (Soviet Union) Irina Vorobieva / Igor Lisovski | |
| 1979 | (Soviet Union) Irina Vorobieva / Igor Lisovski | (Soviet Union) Veronika Pershina / Marat Akbarov | (Soviet Union) Zhanna Ilina / Alexander Vlasov | |
| 1980 | (Soviet Union) Irina Vorobieva / Igor Lisovski | (Soviet Union) Nelli Chervotkina / Viktor Teslia | (Soviet Union) Elena Valova / Oleg Vasiliev | |
| 1981 | (Soviet Union) Larisa Selezneva / Oleg Makarov | (Soviet Union) Veronika Pershina / Marat Akbarov | (Canada) Lorri Baier / Lloyd Eisler | |
| 1982 | (Soviet Union) Veronika Pershina / Marat Akbarov | (Soviet Union) Larisa Selezneva / Oleg Makarov | (Soviet Union) Elena Valova / Oleg Vasiliev | |
| 1983 | (Soviet Union) Larisa Selezneva / Oleg Makarov | (Soviet Union) Veronika Pershina / Marat Akbarov | (Soviet Union) Elena Bechke / Valeri Kornienko | |
| 1984 | (Soviet Union) Larisa Selezneva / Oleg Makarov | (Soviet Union) Veronika Pershina / Marat Akbarov | (Soviet Union) Elena Bechke / Valeri Kornienko | |
| 1985 | (Soviet Union) Larisa Selezneva / Oleg Makarov | (Soviet Union) Veronika Pershina / Marat Akbarov | (Soviet Union) Elena Bechke / Valeri Kornienko | |
| 1986 | (Soviet Union) Elena Kvitchenko / Rashid Kadyrkaev | (Soviet Union) Elena Bechke / Valeri Kornienko | (Soviet Union) Lyudmila Koblova / Andrei Kalitin | |
| 1987 | (Soviet Union) Ekaterina Gordeeva / Sergei Grinkov | (Soviet Union) Elena Valova / Oleg Vasiliev | (Soviet Union) Larisa Selezneva / Oleg Makarov | |
| 1988 | (Soviet Union) Natalia Mishkutenok / Artur Dmitriev | (Soviet Union) Elena Bechke / Denis Petrov | (Soviet Union) Marina Eltsova / Sergei Zaitsev | |
| 1989 | not held | | | |
| 1990 | (Soviet Union) Evgenia Shishkova / Vadim Naumov | (Soviet Union) Elena Leonova / Sergei Petrovskii | (Soviet Union) Yulia Borisova & Valery Artiukhov | |

=== Ice dancing ===
Ice dancing medalists
| Year | Gold | Silver | Bronze | Refs |
|---|---|---|---|---|
| 1966 | (Soviet Union) Irina Grishkova / Viktor Ryzhkin | (East Germany) Annerose Baier / Eberhard Rüger | (Czechoslovakia) Dana Novotná / Jaroslav Hainz | |
| 1967 | (Soviet Union) Irina Grishkova / Viktor Ryzhkin | (Soviet Union) Liudmila Pakhomova / Alexander Gorshkov | (Czechoslovakia) Dana Novotná / Jaromír Holan | |
| 1968 | (East Germany) Annerose Baier / Eberhard Rüger | (Soviet Union) Tatiana Voitiuk / Viacheslav Zhigalin | (Soviet Union) Elena Zharkova / Gennadi Karponosov | |
| 1969 | (Soviet Union) Liudmila Pakhomova / Alexander Gorshkov | (Soviet Union) Elena Zharkova / Gennadi Karponosov | (Soviet Union) Tatiana Voitiuk / Viacheslav Zhigalin | |
| 1970 | (Soviet Union) Liudmila Pakhomova / Alexander Gorshkov | (Soviet Union) Tatiana Voitiuk / Viacheslav Zhigalin | (Soviet Union) Elena Zharkova / Gennadi Karponosov | |
| 1971 | (Soviet Union) Liudmila Pakhomova / Alexander Gorshkov | (Soviet Union) Tatiana Voitiuk / Viacheslav Zhigalin | (Soviet Union) Elena Zharkova / Gennadi Karponosov | |
| 1972 | (Soviet Union) Liudmila Pakhomova / Alexander Gorshkov | (Soviet Union) Irina Moiseeva / Andrei Minenkov | (Soviet Union) Natalia Linichuk / Gennadi Karponosov | |
| 1973 | (Soviet Union) Natalia Linichuk / Gennadi Karponosov | (Soviet Union) Irina Moiseeva / Andrei Minenkov | (Soviet Union) Svetlana Alexeeva / Alexander Boichuk | |
| 1974 | (Soviet Union) Liudmila Pakhomova / Alexander Gorshkov | (Soviet Union) Irina Moiseeva / Andrei Minenkov | (Poland) Teresa Weyna / Piotr Bojanczyk | |
| 1975 | (Soviet Union) Liudmila Pakhomova / Alexander Gorshkov | (Soviet Union) Natalia Linichuk / Gennadi Karponosov | (Soviet Union) Lilia Karavaeva / Viacheslav Zhigalin | |
| 1976 | (Soviet Union) Irina Moiseeva / Andrei Minenkov | (Soviet Union) Natalia Linichuk / Gennadi Karponosov | (Soviet Union) Marina Zueva / Andrei Vitman | |
| 1977 | (Soviet Union) Irina Moiseeva / Andrei Minenkov | (Soviet Union) Natalia Linichuk / Gennadi Karponosov | (Soviet Union) Marina Zueva / Andrei Vitman | |
| 1978 | (Soviet Union) Irina Moiseeva / Andrei Minenkov | (Soviet Union) Elena Garanina / Igor Zavozin | (Soviet Union) Marina Zueva / Andrei Vitman | |
| 1979 | (Soviet Union) Natalia Linichuk / Gennadi Karponosov | (Soviet Union) Natalia Bestemianova / Andrei Bukin | (Soviet Union) Natalia Karamysheva / Rostislav Sinitsyn | |
| 1980 | (Soviet Union) Natalia Linichuk / Gennadi Karponosov | (Soviet Union) Irina Moiseeva / Andrei Minenkov | (Soviet Union) Natalia Bestemianova / Andrei Bukin | |
| 1981 | (Soviet Union) Natalia Bestemianova / Andrei Bukin | (Soviet Union) Irina Moiseeva / Andrei Minenkov | (Soviet Union) Olga Volozhinskaya / Alexander Svinin | |
| 1982 | (Soviet Union) Natalia Bestemianova / Andrei Bukin | (Soviet Union) Olga Volozhinskaya / Alexander Svinin | (Soviet Union) Marina Klimova / Sergei Ponomarenko | |
| 1983 | (Soviet Union) Natalia Bestemianova / Andrei Bukin | (Soviet Union) Marina Klimova / Sergei Ponomarenko | (Soviet Union) Olga Volozhinskaya / Alexander Svinin | |
| 1984 | (Soviet Union) Marina Klimova / Sergei Ponomarenko | (Soviet Union) Natalia Bestemianova / Andrei Bukin | (Soviet Union) Olga Volozhinskaya / Alexander Svinin | |
| 1985 | (Soviet Union) Natalia Bestemianova / Andrei Bukin | (Soviet Union) Marina Klimova / Sergei Ponomarenko | (Soviet Union) Natalia Annenko / Genrikh Sretenski | |
| 1986 | (Soviet Union) Marina Klimova / Sergei Ponomarenko | (Soviet Union) Natalia Annenko / Genrikh Sretenski | (Soviet Union) Maya Usova / Alexander Zhulin | |
| 1987 | (Soviet Union) Marina Klimova / Sergei Ponomarenko | (Soviet Union) Maya Usova / Alexander Zhulin | (Soviet Union) Natalia Annenko / Genrikh Sretenski | |
| 1988 | (Soviet Union) Marina Klimova / Sergei Ponomarenko | (Soviet Union) Larisa Fedorinova / Evgeni Platov | (Soviet Union) Ilona Melnichenko / Gennadi Kaskov | |
| 1989 | not held | | | |
| 1990 | (Soviet Union) Ilona Melnichenko / Gennadi Kaskov | (Soviet Union) Irina Anciferova & Oleg Granenov | (Soviet Union) Natalia Linets & Aleksei Kislitsin | |
