= 1990 Prize of Moscow News =

1990 Prizes of Gosteleradio USSR
- Season: 1990–1991
- Location: Odessa

Champions
- Men's singles: Alexei Urmanov (URS)
- Ladies' singles: Tatiana Rachkova (URS)
- Previous: 1988 Prize of Moscow News

The 1990 Prizes of Gosteleradio USSR was the 24th and final edition of an international figure skating competition organized in Soviet Union. That year was an international competition for the Prizes of the Gosteleradio USSR in Odessa, which became the legal successor of Prize of Moscow News competition). It was held in late 1990. Medals were awarded in the disciplines of men's singles, ladies' singles, pair skating and ice dancing. Only the men's medalists are known.

== Men ==
Rank	Name	Nation
1	Alexei Urmanov	Soviet Union
2	Mikhail Shmerkin	Soviet Union
3	Oleg Tataurov	Soviet Union
...		
8	Matthew Hall	Canada
...		

== Ladies ==
Rank	Name	Nation
1	Tatiana Rachkova	Soviet Union
2		
3		
...		

== Pairs ==
Rank	Name	Nation
1		
2		
3		
...		

== Ice dancing ==
Rank	Name	Nation
1		
2		
3		
...		
