= Stephen Carr (figure skater) =

Australian pair skater

Personal information
- Born: 6 January 1966 (age 60) Sydney, Australia

Figure skating career
- Country: Australia
- Partner: Danielle Carr
- Coach: Sergei Shakhrai, Kerry Leitch
- Retired: 1999

Stephen Carr (born 6 January 1966) is an Australian former pair skater. With his sister, Danielle, he is a nineteen-time (1980–1998) Australian national champion. They competed at the 1992 Winter Olympics, placing 13th, the 1994 Winter Olympics, placing 11th, and the 1998 Winter Olympics, again placing 13th. They retired from competitive skating around 1998. During their career, they were coached by Sergei Shakhrai and Kerry Leitch.

As of 2006, Carr was working as a skating coach in Sydney, Australia. He coached Sean Carlow and Emma Brien / Stuart Beckingham.

== Results ==
GP: Champions Series (Grand Prix)

=== Singles ===
International
Event	81–82	83-84	86–87	88–89	89–90	90–91	91–92	92–93	93–94	94–95	95–96
Olympics									18th		
Worlds					29th			25th	22nd		35th
GP Skate Canada										11th	
Golden Spin				9th		6th					
Piruetten								15th			
Prague Skate			4th								15th
Karl Schäfer					10th						
St. Gervais							13th				
Summer Trophy										3rd	
International: Junior
Junior Worlds	19th										
National
Australian Champs.		3rd					1st	1st	1st	1st	

=== Pairs with Danielle Carr ===
International
Event	80–81	81–82	82–83	83–84	84–85	85–86	86–87	87–88	88–89	89–90	90–91	91–92	92–93	93–94	94–95	95–96	96–97	97–98	98–99
Olympics												13th		11th				13th	
Worlds					11th	14th	12th	15th	10th	16th	16th	14th	11th	10th	11th	12th	16th	15th	
GP Rostelecom Cup																	7th		
GP France																	7th		
GP NHK Trophy																	8th	6th	
GP Skate Canada																		8th	
Nebelhorn												11th							
NHK Trophy				7th				5th		6th		9th			8th				
Piruetten													3rd	7th					
Prague Skate									3rd		5th								
Skate America											11th		8th						
Skate Canada											6th		3rd	5th	5th				
St. Gervais												12th							
International: Junior
Junior Worlds	8th	13th	7th	7th															
National
Australian Champs.	1st	1st	1st	1st	1st	1st	1st	1st	1st	1st	1st	1st	1st	1st	1st	1st	1st	1st	1st
