= Danielle McGrath =

Australian pair skater

Danielle McGrath (Carr)
Personal information
- Born: 6 November 1969 (age 56) Sydney, Australia

Figure skating career
- Country: Australia
- Partner: Stephen Carr
- Coach: Sergei Shakhrai, Kerry Leitch
- Retired: 1999

Danielle Vanessa McGrath, née Carr OAM (born 6 November 1969 in Sydney) is an Australian former pair skater. With her brother, Stephen Carr, she is a nineteen-time (1980–1998) Australian national champion. They competed at the 1992 Winter Olympics, placing 13th, the 1994 Winter Olympics, placing 11th, and the 1998 Winter Olympics, again placing 13th. They retired from competitive skating following the 1998 Olympic season. During their amateur career, they were coached by Sergei Shakhrai and Kerry Leitch.

In the 2000 Australia Day Honours McGrath was awarded the Medal of the Order of Australia (OAM) for "service to figure skating at Australian and World Championships, and to the Olympic movement".

As of 2006, McGrath was working as a skating coach in Sydney, Australia. She coached Emma Brien / Stuart Beckingham.

== Results ==
GP: Champions Series (Grand Prix)

with Stephen Carr

International
Event	80–81	81–82	82–83	83–84	84–85	85–86	86–87	87–88	88–89	89–90	90–91	91–92	92–93	93–94	94–95	95–96	96–97	97–98	98–99
Olympics												13th		11th				13th	
Worlds					11th	14th	12th	15th	10th	16th	16th	14th	11th	10th	11th	12th	16th	15th	
GP Cup of Russia																	7th		
GP Lalique																	7th		
GP NHK Trophy																	8th	6th	
GP Skate Canada																		8th	
Nebelhorn												11th							
NHK Trophy				7th				5th		6th		9th			8th				
Piruetten													3rd	7th					
Prague Skate									3rd		5th								
Skate America											11th		8th						
Skate Canada											6th		3rd	5th	5th				
St. Gervais												12th							
International: Junior
Junior Worlds	8th	13th	7th	7th															
National
Australia	1st	1st	1st	1st	1st	1st	1st	1st	1st	1st	1st	1st	1st	1st	1st	1st	1st	1st	1st
