= Elena Shcheglova =

Russian figure skater

Personal information
- Native name: Елена Львовна Щеглова
- Full name: Elena Lvovna Shcheglova
- Born: 2 August 1950 (age 76) Moscow, Russian SFSR, Soviet Union
- Height: 1.64 m (5 ft 5 in)

Figure skating career
- Country: Soviet Union
- Coach: Tatiana Tolmacheva, Stanislav Zhuk, Igor Moskvin, Edouard Pliner
- Retired: c. 1970

Elena Lvovna Shcheglova (Russian: Елена Львовна Щеглова; born 2 August 1950 in Moscow) is a Russian former figure skater who represented the Soviet Union in international competition.

She is a two-time Prize of Moscow News champion and a two-time Soviet national champion. Shcheglova finished in the top ten at two World Championships and three European Championships. She placed 12th at the 1968 Winter Olympics in Grenoble, France.

== Competitive highlights ==
International
Event	64–65	65–66	66–67	67–68	68–69	69–70
Winter Olympics				12th		
World Champ.		17th	15th	10th	10th	12th
European Champ.		17th	8th	6th	6th	
Prague Skate				6th		
Prize of Moscow News					1st	1st
National
Soviet Champ.	3rd		1st	2nd	1st	2nd
