= Matthew Hall (figure skater) =

Canadian figure skater (born 1970)

Matthew Hall (born 1970) is a Canadian figure skater. He is the 1989 bronze medalist at the Canadian Figure Skating Championships as well as the 1989 Canada Games. He trained at the Mariposa School of Skating.

Hall was one of the first elite level athletes to come out as gay while still competing. He made his sexual orientation public in 1992.

== Competitive highlights ==
International
Event	83–84	84–85	85–86	86–87	87–88	88–89	89–90	90–91	91–92	92–93	93–94	94–95	95–96
Trophée Lalique												13th	
NHK Trophy							7th						
Skate America				6th			7th						
Skate Canada						4th	4th						
Vienna Cup					2nd								6th
Moscow News					4th			8th					
Coupe d'Excellence					2nd								
Nebelhorn Trophy			10th										
International: Junior
Junior Worlds	6th												
National
Canadian Champ.		2nd J				3rd						8th	8th
J = Junior level
