= Annerose Baier =

German ice dancer (1946–2022)

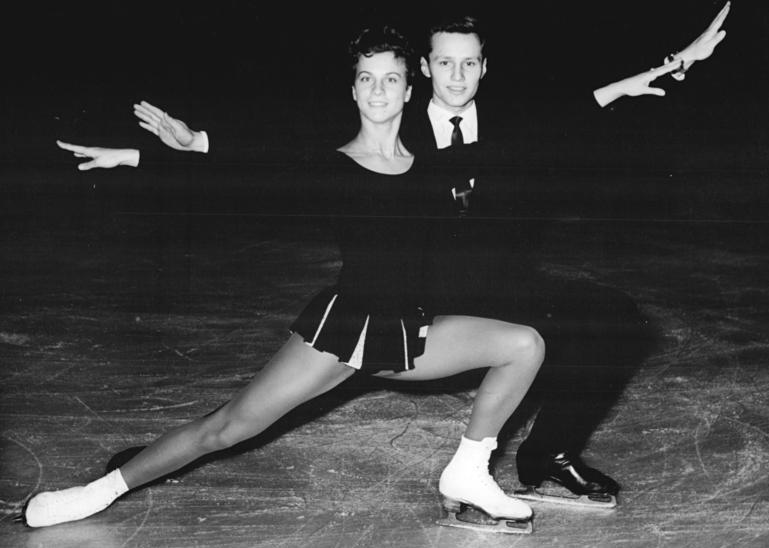
- Baier with Rüger in 1964

Personal information
- Other names: Wetzel
- Born: 9 September 1946
- Died: 9 March 2022 (aged 75) Bad Elster, Germany

Figure skating career
- Country: East Germany
- Partner: Eberhard Rüger
- Skating club: SC Karl-Marx-Stadt; SC Wismut Karl-Marx-Stadt
- Retired: 1970

Annerose Baier, married surname: Wetzel, (9 September 1946 — 9 March 2022) was a German ice dancer who represented East Germany. With her skating partner, Eberhard Rüger, she became a three-time Blue Swords champion (1963, 1965, 1966), the 1968 Prize of Moscow News champion, and an eight-time East German national champion (1962, 1964–1970). They finished in the top ten at eight ISU Championships. Their best continental result, fourth, came at the 1970 European Championships in Leningrad, Soviet Union. They finished as high as sixth at the World Championships, in 1969 (Colorado Springs, Colorado, United States) and 1970 (Ljubljana, Yugoslavia).

Baier/Rüger started their career at SC Wismut Karl-Marx-Stadt. In 1963, they began representing SC Karl-Marx-Stadt.

After retiring from competition, Baier coached skating in Karl-Marx-Stadt/Chemnitz.

== Competitive highlights ==
With Rüger

International
Event	61–62	62–63	63–64	64–65	65–66	66–67	67–68	68–69	69–70
Worlds				14th	13th	12th	10th	6th	6th
Europeans				11th	9th	7th	7th	5th	4th
Blue Swords			1st	2nd	1st	1st	2nd	2nd	2nd
Prague Skate				4th		5th	3rd		
Moscow News						2nd	4th	1st	
National
East Germany	1st	2nd	1st	1st	1st	1st	1st	1st	1st
