= Eberhard Rüger =

East German ice dancer

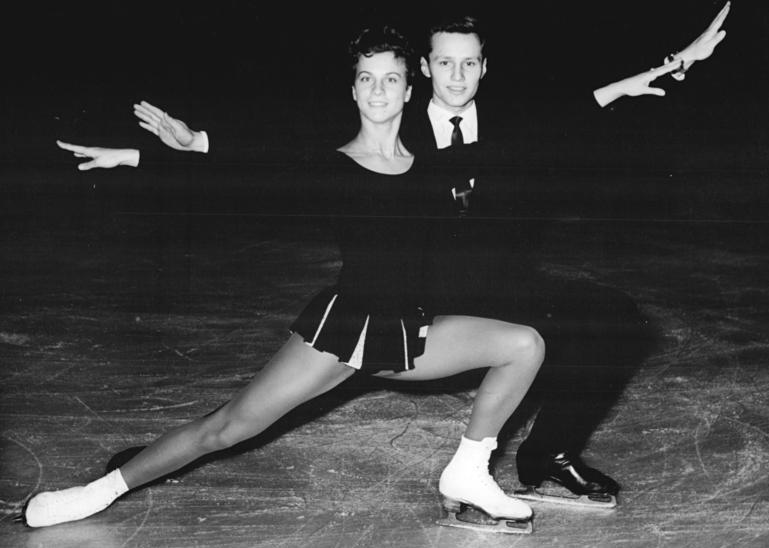
- Rüger with Baier in 1964

Figure skating career
- Country: East Germany
- Partner: Annerose Baier
- Skating club: SC Karl-Marx-Stadt; SC Wismut Karl-Marx-Stadt
- Retired: 1970

Eberhard Rüger is a German former ice dancer who represented East Germany. With his skating partner, Annerose Baier, he became a three-time Blue Swords champion (1963, 1965, 1966), the 1968 Prize of Moscow News champion, and an eight-time East German national champion (1962, 1964–1970). They finished in the top ten at eight ISU Championships. Their best continental result, fourth, came at the 1970 European Championships in Leningrad, Soviet Union. They finished as high as sixth at the World Championships, in 1969 (Colorado Springs, Colorado, United States) and 1970 (Ljubljana, Yugoslavia).

Baier/Rüger started their career at SC Wismut Karl-Marx-Stadt. In 1963, they began representing SC Karl-Marx-Stadt.

Rüger was married to German figure skater Gabriele Seyfert from 1972 to 1975. Their daughter, Sheila, was born in 1974.

== Competitive highlights ==
With Baier

International
Event	61–62	62–63	63–64	64–65	65–66	66–67	67–68	68–69	69–70
Worlds				14th	13th	12th	10th	6th	6th
Europeans				11th	9th	7th	7th	5th	4th
Blue Swords			1st	2nd	1st	1st	2nd	2nd	2nd
Prague Skate				4th		5th	3rd		
Moscow News						2nd	4th	1st	
National
East Germany	1st	2nd	1st	1st	1st	1st	1st	1st	1st
