= Rashid Kadyrkaev =

Uzbeki retired pair skater

Figure skating career
- Country: Soviet Union
- Retired: 1989

Rashid Kadyrkaev (Russian: Рашид Кадыркаев, born in Uzbek SSR) is an Uzbeki retired pair skater who competed internationally for the Soviet Union.

== Career ==
Kadyrkaev first had success internationally skating with Marina Nikitiuk. They were coached by Valeri Tyukov. Nikitiuk and Kadyrkaev won the silver medal at the 1980 World Junior Figure Skating Championships and the bronze medal at the 1981 Junior Worlds. He now lives in the United States as an ice skating director and coach.

In 1982, Coach Stanislav Zhuk broke up their partnership and partnered Kadyrkaev with Marina Cherkasova. However, that partnership did not last and Kadyrkaev moved to Leningrad to skate with Elena Kvitchenko.

Kvitchenko and Kadyrkaev were coached by Tamara Moskvina and Igor Moskvin. During their career, they won the 1987 Winter Universiade and competed at both the World Figure Skating Championships and European Figure Skating Championships. They were the 1989 Soviet Figure Skating Championships silver medalists. They turned professional in 1989 and toured with the Ice Capades.

Kadyrkaev now works as a coach in Ashburn, VA in the United States. His former students include Tamar Katz and Igor Matsipura.

== Competitive highlights ==
=== With Kvitchenko ===
International
Event	1985–86	1986–87	1987–88	1988–89
World Championships				6th
European Championships				4th
Skate Canada		4th	2nd	
Prize of Moscow News	5th	1st	5th	4th
Winter Universiade		1st		
National
Soviet Championships	4th	3rd	3rd	3rd
Spartakiada	1st			
USSR Cup	1st			2nd

=== With Nikitiuk ===
International
Event	1977–78	1978–79	1979–80	1980–81	1981–82
World Junior Champ.			2nd	3rd	4th
National
Spartakiada	15th J				
J = Junior level
