= Halyna Kukhar =

Soviet figure skater (born 1951)

Halyna Kukhar Galina Kukhar
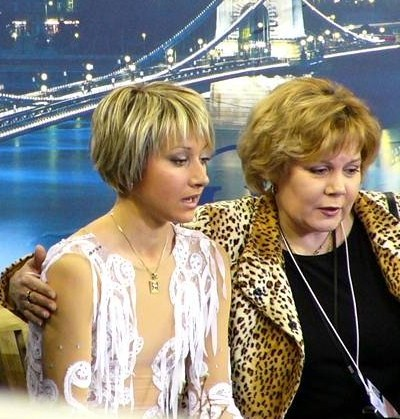
- Kukhar at the 2004 European Championships with Galina Efremenko

Personal information
- Full name: Halyna Vladyslavivna Kukhar (Hrzhybovska)
- Born: 12 July 1951 (age 75) Moscow, Russian SFSR, Soviet Union

Figure skating career
- Country: Soviet Union
- Retired: 1969

Halyna Vladyslavivna Kukhar or Hrzhybovska (Ukrainian: Галина Владиславівна Кухар (Гржибовська)), née Galina Vladislavovna Grzhibovskaya (Russian: Галина Владиславовна Гржибовская; born 12 July 1951) is a Ukrainian figure skating coach and former competitive skater who represented the Soviet Union. She is the 1968 Soviet champion and competed at the 1968 Winter Olympics.

== Personal life ==
Kukhar was born on 12 July 1951 in Moscow, Russian SFSR, Soviet Union, as Galina Vladislavovna Grzhibovskaya (Ukrainian: Halyna Vladyslavivna Hrzhybovska). She married the chief engineer of the Kiev Ballet on Ice, Heorhiy Kukhar, and settled in Kyiv, Ukraine.

== Career ==
Grzhibovskaya was taught by Svetlana Mozer (mother of Nina Mozer) in a large children's group in Moscow until Tatiana Tolmacheva took the young skater in her own group.

In the 1967–68 season, Grzhibovskaya won the Soviet national ladies' title and placed 12th at the 1968 European Championships. She was then sent to the 1968 Winter Olympics in Grenoble, where she finished 16th. She then joined Stanislav Zhuk.

The following season, Grzhibovskaya placed 14th at both the 1969 European Championships and 1969 World Championships. Unable to adapt to his authoritarian style, she left Zhuk's group and joined the Kiev Ballet on Ice, where she skated for 23 years.

In the early 1990s, Kukhar began a coaching career in Kyiv. Her former students include:

- Aliona Savchenko (from age 7)
- Tatiana Volosozhar
- Galina Efremenko (Maniachenko)
- Dmitri Dmitrenko
- Anton Kovalevski
- Stanislav Morozov (from 1996)
- Andrei Deputat
- Oleksii Bychenko

== Competitive highlights ==
International
Event	1965–66	1966–67	1967–68	1968–69
Winter Olympics			16th	
World Championships				14th
European Championships			12th	14th
Prague Skate		8th		
Prize of Moscow News				2nd
National
Soviet Championships	2nd	2nd	1st	2nd
