= Elena Zharkova =

Russian ice dancer

Personal information
- Native name: Елена Викторовна Жаркова
- Full name: Elena Viktorovna Zharkova
- Born: 12 July 1953 Moscow, Soviet Union
- Died: 4 November 1980 (aged 27) Moscow, Soviet Union

Figure skating career
- Country: Soviet Union
- Partner: Gennadi Karponosov
- Coach: Elena Tchaikovskaia
- Skating club: Dynamo Moscow
- Retired: 1972

Elena Viktorovna Zharkova (Russian: Елена Викторовна Жаркова; 12 July 1953 – 4 November 1980) was a Russian ice dancer who represented the Soviet Union. With Gennadi Karponosov, she won three medals at the Prize of Moscow News medalist and four at the Soviet Championships. The duo finished in the top eight at three World Championships and in the top six at three European Figure Skating Championships. They were coached by Elena Tchaikovskaia in Moscow.

== Competitive highlights ==
With Karponosov

International
Event	1968–69	1969–70	1970–71	1971–72
World Championships		8th	8th	8th
European Championships	11th	6th	6th	6th
Prize of Moscow News		2nd	3rd	3rd
National
Soviet Championships	3rd	3rd	3rd	2nd
