= Andrei Suraikin =

Russian pair skater

Olympic medal record

Figure Skating

Representing Soviet Union
Silver medal – second place	1972 Sapporo	Pairs

Andrei Suraikin
Personal information
- Full name: Andrei Alexandrovich Suraikin
- Born: October 20, 1948 Leningrad, Soviet Union
- Died: September 28, 1996 Saint Petersburg, Russia

Figure skating career
- Country: Soviet Union
Medal record
Representing Soviet Union
Pairs' Figure skating
Olympic Games
Silver medal – second place	1972 Sapporo	Pairs
World Championships
Silver medal – second place	1972 Calgary	Pairs
Silver medal – second place	1971 Lyon	Pairs
Silver medal – second place	1970 Ljubljana	Pairs
European Championships
Silver medal – second place	1972 Gothenburg	Pairs
Silver medal – second place	1971 Zürich	Pairs
Silver medal – second place	1970 Leningrad	Pairs

Andrei Alexandrovich Suraikin (Russian: Андрей Александрович Сурайкин; 20 October 1948 -28 September 1996) was a Russian pair skater. With partner Liudmila Smirnova, he was the 1972 Olympic silver medalist.

== Career ==
Suraikin began figure skating in 1957 and became a member of the USSR National Team in 1968. He trained at Spartak in Leningrad.

Suraikin competed with Liudmila Smirnova, coached by Maya Belenkaya. Smirnova and Suraikin won the silver medal at the 1972 Winter Olympics. In 1972 Suraikin was awarded the Medal For Labour Heroism.

In 1972 Suraikin paired with Natalia Ovchinnikova for a few seasons before retiring to coach. He was one of the first coaches for Larisa Selezneva and Oleg Makarov.

== Results ==
(with Smirnova)

Event	1968-1969	1969–1970	1970–1971	1971–1972
Winter Olympic Games				2nd
World Championships		2nd	2nd	2nd
European Championships		2nd	2nd	2nd
Prize of Moscow News		2nd	1st	2nd
Winter Universiade		1st		
Soviet Championships	4th	2nd	2nd	
USSR Cup	2nd			

== Results ==
(with Ovchinnikova)

Event	1972–1973	1973–1974
Prize of Moscow News		4th
Spartakiada		6th*
USSR Cup	4th	

- 1974 Spartakiada results used for 1974 Soviet Nationals
