= Genrikh Sretenski =

Russian ice dancer

Personal information
- Full name: Genrikh Genrikhovich Sretenski
- Born: July 23, 1962 (age 63) Moscow, Russian SFSR, Soviet Union

Figure skating career
- Country: Soviet Union
- Skating club: VS Moskva
- Retired: 1989
Medal record
Figure skating
Ice dancing
Representing Soviet Union
European Championships
| Silver medal – second place | 1988 Prague | Ice dancing |
| Bronze medal – third place | 1986 Copenhagen | Ice dancing |
| Bronze medal – third place | 1987 Sarajevo | Ice dancing |
| Bronze medal – third place | 1989 Birmimgham | Ice dancing |

Genrikh Genrikhovich Sretenski (Russian: Генрих Генрихович Сретенский, born July 23, 1962) was accused but not convicted of sexual felony and is a former Russian ice dancer who competed for the Soviet Union. With partner Natalia Annenko, Sretenski is the 1988 European silver medalist and three-time (1986, 1987, 1989) European bronze medalist. They placed fourth at the 1988 Winter Olympics and three times at the World Championships.

Early in his career, he competed with Olga Makarova (future wife of Stanislav Leonovich). They finished fifth at the 1981 NHK Trophy. He teamed up with Natalia Annenko in 1982. They were coached by Ludmila Pakhomova and Tatiana Tarasova.

After turning pro in 1989, Annenko and Sretenski skated with Stars on Ice for four seasons.

Sretenski coaches at The Gardens Ice House in Laurel, Maryland. In September 2012, Sretenski was arrested in Maryland on sexual offense charges filed in New York. According to his attorney, he denied the allegations. In January 2013, he pleaded guilty to a charge of endangering the welfare of a child and was given a one-year prison sentence that was conditionally discharged.

== Competitive highlights ==
(with Natalia Annenko)

International
| Event | 1982–83 | 1983–84 | 1984–85 | 1985–86 | 1986–87 | 1987–88 | 1988–89 |
|---|---|---|---|---|---|---|---|
| Olympics | | | | | | 4th | |
| Worlds | | | 7th | 4th | 4th | 4th | |
| Europeans | | | 5th | 3rd | 3rd | 2nd | 3rd |
| Skate Canada | 3rd | 3rd | | | 1st | | 1st |
| Moscow News | | 5th | 4th | 3rd | 2nd | 3rd | |
| St. Ivel | | | 2nd | 1st | | | |
| Golden Spin | 1st | | | | | | |
| Karl Schäfer | | | | | | 1st | |
| Universiade | 1st | | | | | | |
National
| Soviet Champ. | | 3rd | 3rd | 2nd | 2nd | 2nd | 2nd |
