= Marat Akbarov =

Pair skater

Personal information
- Born: February 3, 1961 (age 65) Sverdlovsk, Russian SFSR, Soviet Union

Figure skating career
- Country: Soviet Union
- Began skating: 1968
- Retired: 1986
Medal record
Representing Soviet Union
Pairs' Figure skating
European Championships
Bronze medal – third place	1985 Gothenburg	Pairs
World Junior Championships
Gold medal – first place	1979 Augsburg	Pairs

Marat Akbarov (Russian: Марат Фагимович Акбаров, born February 3, 1961) is a former competitive pair skater for the Soviet Union. With Veronica Pershina, he is the 1985 European bronze medalist and 1979 World Junior champion.

== Career ==
Akbarov began skating in 1968 at the Lokomotiv Skating Club in Sverdlovsk (now Yekaterinburg) with coach Alexander Rogin. He teamed up with Veronica Pershina in 1975. The pair moved to Moscow in 1978 to train with Stanislav Zhuk. They won the World Junior title in 1979 ahead of Larisa Selezneva / Oleg Makarov.

In 1980, Pershina/Akbarov made their senior World Championship debut, placing 6th. The following season, they won the Soviet national title ahead of Irina Vorobieva / Igor Lisovski. The pair changed coaches to Irina Rodnina in 1982.

Pershina/Akbarov were gold medalists at the 1982 Prize of Moscow News and 1983 NHK Trophy. In 1985, they were sent to their fourth European Championships and won the bronze medal. They took silver at the Skate Canada International in their final season.

After retiring from competition, Akbarov performed with the Russian All Stars under the direction of Tatiana Tarasova, before becoming a coach. He coaches at the Wheaton Ice Skating Academy in Wheaton, Maryland.

== Personal life ==
Akbarov married fellow pair skater Marina Pestova, with whom he has a daughter, Angela.

== Results ==
(with Pershina)

International
Event	77–78	78–79	79–80	80–81	81–82	82–83	83–84	84–85	85–86
Worlds			6th	6th	6th	5th	8th	6th	
Europeans				5th	4th	4th		3rd	
Skate Canada									2nd
NHK Trophy			4th				1st	2nd	
Moscow News			2nd		2nd	1st	2nd	2nd	2nd
International: Junior
Junior Worlds		1st							
National
Soviet Champ.				1st	2nd	2nd		3rd	3rd
Spartakiada	2nd J								
USSR Cup				1st					
J = Junior level
