= Natalia Ovchinnikova =

Personal information
- Full name: Natalia Evgenyevna Ovchinnikova
- Other names: Natalia Bobrina (married)

Figure skating career
- Country: Soviet Union

Natalia Evgenyevna Ovchinnikova, married surname: Bobrina (Russian: Наталья Евгеньевна Корелина (Овчинникова)) is a former competitive figure skater for the Soviet Union. She is the 1983 Winter Universiade champion, 1982 Golden Spin of Zagreb silver medalist, 1982 Nebelhorn Trophy bronze medalist, and 1983 Karl Schäfer Memorial bronze medalist. She was coached by Igor Ksenofontov and Marina Obodyannikova.

== Competitive highlights ==
International
Event	1982–83	1983–84
Winter Universiade	1st	
Golden Spin of Zagreb	2nd	
Karl Schäfer Memorial		3rd
Nebelhorn Trophy	3rd	
