= Veronica Pershina =

Russian figure skater (born 1966)

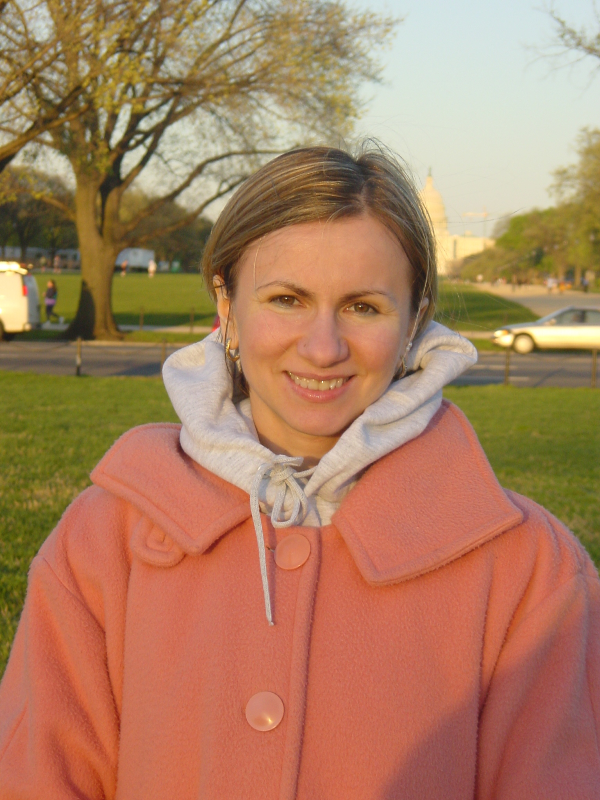
- Pershina in 2004

Personal information
- Native name: Вероника Петровна Першина
- Full name: Veronica Petrovna Pershina
- Other names: Veronica Voyk
- Born: December 20, 1966 (age 59) Sverdlovsk, Russian SFSR, Soviet Union
- Spouse: Igor Shpilband (divorced)

Figure skating career
- Country: Soviet Union
- Retired: 1986
Medal record
Representing Soviet Union
Pairs' Figure skating
European Championships
| Bronze medal – third place | 1985 Gothenburg | Pairs |
World Junior Championships
| Gold medal – first place | 1979 Augsburg | Pairs |

Veronica Petrovna Pershina or Voyk (Russian: Вероника Петровна Першина, born December 20, 1966) is a former competitive pair skater who competed for the Soviet Union. With Marat Akbarov, she is the 1985 European bronze medalist and 1979 World Junior champion.

== Career ==
Pershina teamed up with Marat Akbarov in 1975. The pair moved to Moscow in 1978 to train with Stanislav Zhuk. They won the World Junior title in 1979 ahead of Larisa Selezneva / Oleg Makarov.

In 1980, Pershina/Akbarov made their senior World Championship debut, placing 6th. The following season, they won the Soviet national title ahead of Irina Vorobieva / Igor Lisovski. The pair changed coaches to Irina Rodnina in 1982.

Pershina/Akbarov were gold medalists at the 1982 Prize of Moscow News and 1983 NHK Trophy. In 1985, they were sent to their fourth European Championships and won the bronze medal. They took silver at the Skate Canada International in their final season.

From 1986 until 1990, Pershina performed with the Russian All Stars under the direction of Tatiana Tarasova. She toured worldwide with Jayne Torvill and Christopher Dean from 1988 until 1990. On January 24, 1990, Pershina defected to the United States rather than return from New York to London with the Torvill & Dean / Russian All Stars tour group. Others who defected with her were her future husband Igor Shpilband, future US ice dancing champion Gorsha Sur, and former World Junior ice dancing champion Elena Krykanova.

Pershina, also known as Veronica Voyk, has worked as a skating coach at the Ann Arbor Figure Skating Club in Ann Arbor, Michigan, at the Detroit Skating Club in Bloomfield Hills, Michigan, and at the Onyx Skating Academy in Rochester, Michigan.

== Personal life ==
Pershina was formerly married to Igor Shpilband. Their daughter, Ekaterina "Katia" Shpilband, won the intermediate ladies division at the 2010 US Junior Championships and qualified for the 2013 US Championships on the junior level.

== Results ==
(with Akbarov)

International
| Event | 77–78 | 78–79 | 79–80 | 80–81 | 81–82 | 82–83 | 83–84 | 84–85 | 85–86 |
|---|---|---|---|---|---|---|---|---|---|
| Worlds | | | 6th | 6th | 6th | 5th | 8th | 6th | |
| Europeans | | | | 5th | 4th | 4th | | 3rd | |
| Skate Canada | | | | | | | | | 2nd |
| NHK Trophy | | | 4th | | | | 1st | 2nd | |
| Moscow News | | | 2nd | | 2nd | 1st | 2nd | 2nd | 2nd |
International: Junior
| Junior Worlds | | 1st | | | | | | | |
National
| Soviet Champ. | | | | 1st | 2nd | 2nd | | 3rd | 3rd |
| Spartakiada | 2nd J | | | | | | | | |
| USSR Cup | | | | 1st | | | | | |
J = Junior level
