= Natalia Annenko =

Russian ice dancer

Personal information
- Full name: Natalia Valeryevna Annenko
- Other names: Natalia Annenko Deller
- Born: April 17, 1964 (age 62) Moscow, Russian SFSR, Soviet Union

Figure skating career
- Country: Soviet Union
- Skating club: VS Moskva
- Retired: 1989
Medal record
Figure skating
Ice dancing
Representing Soviet Union
European Championships
Bronze medal – third place	1989 Birmingham	Ice dancing
Silver medal – second place	1988 Prague	Ice dancing
Bronze medal – third place	1987 Tallinn	Ice dancing
Bronze medal – third place	1986 Tallinn	Ice dancing
World Junior Championships
Gold medal – first place	1982 Oberstdorf	Ice dancing
Silver medal – second place	1981 London, ON	Ice dancing

Natalia Valeryevna Annenko (Russian: Наталья Валерьевна Анненко, born April 17, 1964) is a Russian former ice dancer who competed for the Soviet Union. She won the 1982 World Junior Figure Skating Championships with partner Vadim Karkachev. She later went on to compete with Genrikh Sretenski. With Sretenski, she is the 1988 European silver medalist and three-time (1986, 1987, 1989) European bronze medalist. They placed fourth at the 1988 Winter Olympics.

Annenko teamed up with Sretenski in 1982. They were coached by Ludmila Pakhomova and Tatiana Tarasova. After leaving eligible skating in 1989, they skated with Stars on Ice for four seasons.

Annenko was married to Peter Tchernyshev but they divorced after seven years. She is remarried and now known as Natalia Deller or Natalia Annenko-Deller. She coaches at the Detroit Skating Club in Bloomfield Hills, Michigan.

== Competitive highlights ==
(ice dance with Genrikh Sretenski)

International
Event	1982–83	1983–84	1984–85	1985–86	1986–87	1987–88	1988–89
Olympics						4th	
Worlds			7th	4th	4th	4th	
Europeans			5th	3rd	3rd	2nd	3rd
Skate Canada	3rd	3rd			1st		1st
Moscow News		5th	4th	3rd	2nd	3rd	
St. Ivel			2nd	1st			
Golden Spin	1st						
Karl Schäfer						1st	
Universiade	1st						
National
Soviet Champ.		3rd	3rd	2nd	2nd	2nd	2nd

(with Karkachev)

Event	1981	1982
World Junior Championships	2nd	1st
