= Sergei Chetverukhin =

Soviet figure skater

Personal information
- Native name: Серге́й Александрович Четверухин
- Full name: Sergei Alexandrovich Chetverukhin
- Born: 12 January 1946 (age 80) Moscow, Russian SFSR, Soviet Union

Figure skating career
- Country: Soviet Union
- Coach: Tatyana Tolmacheva, Stanislav Zhuk
- Skating club: VSS Trud
- Retired: 1973
Medal record
Representing the Soviet Union
Figure skating: Men's singles
Winter Olympics
Silver medal – second place	1972 Sapporo	Men's singles
World Championships
Silver medal – second place	1973 Bratislava	Men's singles
Silver medal – second place	1972 Calgary	Men's singles
Bronze medal – third place	1971 Lyon	Men's singles
European Championships
Silver medal – second place	1973 Cologne	Men's singles
Silver medal – second place	1972 Gothenburg	Men's singles
Silver medal – second place	1971 Zürich	Men's singles
Bronze medal – third place	1969 Garmisch-Partenkirchen	Men's singles

Sergei Alexandrovich Chetverukhin (Russian: Серге́й Александрович Четверухин; born 12 January 1946) is a former Soviet figure skater. He is the 1972 Olympic silver medalist, a three-time World medalist, and a four-time European medalist.

== Personal life ==
Chetverukhin was born on 12 January 1946 in Moscow, Soviet Union. He moved to Canada in 1990 at the invitation of Canadian figure skater Donald Jackson. He holds Russian and Canadian citizenship. He is married and has a daughter.

== Career ==
Chetverukhin trained at VSS Trud in Moscow. He was coached by Tatyana Tolmacheva and later by Stanislav Zhuk.

Chetverukhin began appearing at major international events in 1965 and won his first Soviet national title in the 1966–67 season. The following season, he repeated as the national champion and also took gold at the 1968 Winter Universiade in Innsbruck, ahead of Marián Filc of Czechoslovakia. He finished 5th at the 1968 European Championships in Västerås, Sweden; 9th at the 1968 Winter Olympics in Grenoble, France; and 9th at the 1968 World Championships in Geneva, Switzerland.

Chetverukhin's first ISU Championship medal, bronze, came at the 1969 Europeans in Garmisch-Partenkirchen, West Germany. The following year, he finished just off the podium at the continental event.

Chetverukhin was awarded medals at both ISU Championships in the 1970–71 season. After winning silver at the 1971 European Championships in Zurich, where he finished second to Czechoslovakia's Ondrej Nepela, he received bronze at the 1971 World Championships in Lyon, France, behind Nepela and France's Patrick Péra. He was the first Soviet male skater to medal at Worlds.

The following season, he won silver at the 1972 European Championships in Gothenburg, Sweden; 1972 Winter Olympics in Sapporo, Japan; and 1972 World Championships in Calgary, Alberta, Canada. Each time he finished second to Nepela. At the Olympics, Chetverukhin was third in the compulsory figures and first in the free skate.

In his final competitive season, Chetverukhin received silver medals at the 1973 European Championships in Cologne, West Germany, and the 1973 World Championships in Bratislava, Czechoslovakia. At both events he placed second to Nepela.

Chetverukhin worked as a skating coach in Montreal before relocating to Toronto.

== Results ==
International
Event	62–63	63–64	64–65	65–66	66–67	67–68	68–69	69–70	70–71	71–72	72–73
Olympics						9th				2nd	
Worlds			17th		13th	9th	8th	6th	3rd	2nd	2nd
Europeans			10th	12th	5th	5th	3rd	4th	2nd	2nd	2nd
Moscow News							1st		1st	1st	1st
Prague Skate					3rd	2nd					
Universiade				2nd		1st		2nd			
National
Soviet Champ.	5th	2nd	3rd	2nd	1st	1st	1st	1st	1st		1st
