= Vladimir Bogolyubov =

Soviet pair skater

Personal information
- Born: 6 October 1954 (age 71)

Figure skating career
- Country: Soviet Union
- Retired: 1976

Vladimir Bogolyubov (Russian: Владимир Боголюбов; born 6 October 1954) is a former pair skater who represented the Soviet Union with Marina Leonidova. Coached by Tamara Moskvina and Tatiana Tarasova, they were three-time Prize of Moscow News bronze medalists and two-time Soviet national bronze medalists. The pair placed fourth at the 1975 European Championships in Copenhagen and fifth at the 1975 World Championships in Colorado Springs, Colorado. They also competed at the 1976 Winter Olympics in Innsbruck and finished ninth.

Bogolyubov later moved to the United States. He is a figure skating coach in Voorhees Township, New Jersey.

== Competitive highlights ==
(with Leonidova)

International
Event	1972–73	1973–74	1974–75	1975–76
Winter Olympics				9th
World Championships			5th	
European Championships			4th	7th
Prize of Moscow News	3rd	3rd		3rd
National
Soviet Championships	6th		3rd	3rd
Spartakiada		4th*		
USSR Cup	2nd		3rd	1st

- 1974 Spartakiada results were used for Soviet Nationals results
