= Tatiana Voitiuk =

Soviet ice dancer

Personal information
- Native name: Тетяна Володимирівна Войтюк
- Full name: Tetiana Volodymyrivna Voitiuk
- Born: 19 March 1953 (age 73) Kirovohrad, Ukrainian SSR, Soviet Union

Figure skating career
- Country: Soviet Union

Tetiana Volodymyrivna Voitiuk (Ukrainian: Тетяна Володимирівна Войтюк; born 19 March 1953) is a former ice dancer who competed for the Soviet Union. With her skating partner, Viacheslav Zhigalin, she became the 1970 European bronze medalist and 1972 Soviet national champion.

== Results ==
(with Zhigalin)

International
Event	68–69	69–70	70–71	71–72	72–73
World Championships	14th	4th	5th	5th	5th
European Championships	10th	3rd	4th	5th	5th
Prize of Moscow News			2nd		
National
Soviet Championships	2nd	2nd	2nd	1st	2nd
