= Aleksandr Vlasov (figure skater) =

Soviet pair skater and coach

Alexander Vlassov
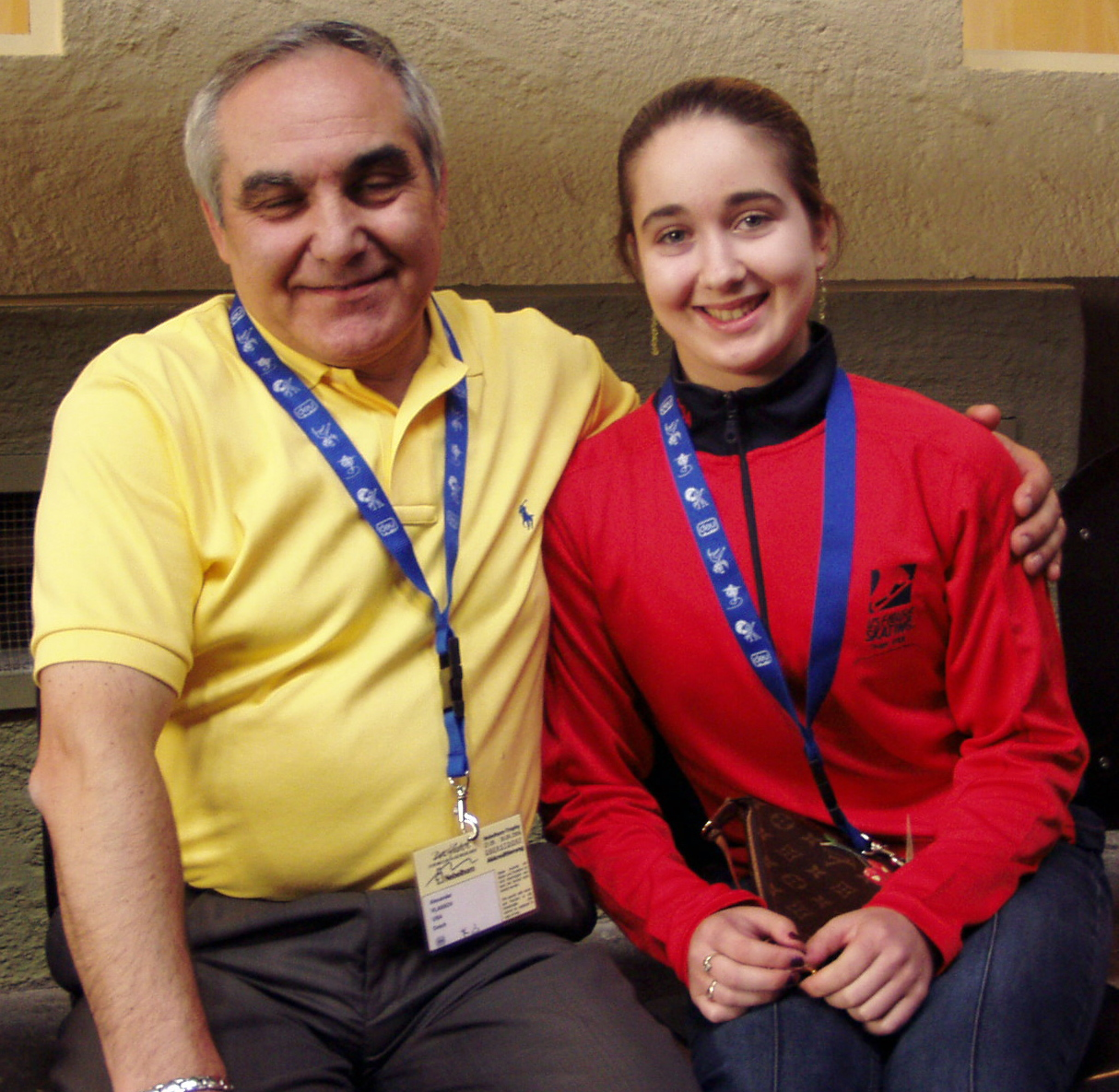
- Alexander Vlassov with his daughter, Julia, in 2006.

Personal information
- Full name: Alexander Vlassov
- Born: 25 February 1955 (age 71)

Figure skating career
- Country: USSR
Medal record
Representing Soviet Union
Pairs' Figure skating
World Championships
| Silver medal – second place | 1977 Tokyo | Pairs |
| Bronze medal – third place | 1976 Gothenburg | Pairs |
European Championships
| Silver medal – second place | 1977 Helsinki | Pairs |
| Bronze medal – third place | 1976 Geneva | Pairs |

Alexander Vlassov (Russian: Александр Власов; born 25 February 1955) is a former Soviet pair skater who currently works as a coach. With partner Irina Vorobieva, he won the silver medal at the 1977 World Figure Skating Championships and the silver medal at the 1977 European Figure Skating Championships. They placed 4th at the 1976 Winter Olympics. They were coached by Tamara Moskvina. He later skated with Zhanna Ilina.

== Family ==
Vlassov is the father and coach of Julia Vlassov. Currently Alexander and his wife Laura are working as a figure skating coaches in Washington, DC

Competitive highlights

=== With Vorobieva ===
| Event | 1971–72 | 1972–73 | 1973–74 | 1974–75 | 1975–76 | 1976–77 |
|---|---|---|---|---|---|---|
| Winter Olympics | | | | | 4th | |
| World Championships | | | 6th | 4th | 3rd | 2nd |
| European Championships | | | | | 3rd | 2nd |
| Prize of Moscow News | | 1st | | | 2nd | |
| Soviet Championships | 2nd | | 3rd | | 1st | 2nd |
| Spartakiada | | | 3rd* | | | |
| USSR Cup | 1st | | | 2nd | 2nd | |

- 1974 Spartakiada results used for Soviet Nationals

=== With Ilina ===
| Event | 1978–79 | 1979-80 |
|---|---|---|
| Nebelhorn Trophy | | 2nd |
| Prize of Moscow News | | 3rd |
| Soviet Championships | 4th | |

== Links ==
- Evans, Hilary; Gjerde, Arild; Heijmans, Jeroen; Mallon, Bill; et al. "Aleksandr Vlasov". Olympics at Sports-Reference.com. Sports Reference LLC. Archived from the original on 2020-04-18.
- Skatabase: 1970s Europeans
- Skatabase: 1970s Worlds
