= Marina Pestova =

Soviet pair skater

Personal information
- Full name: Marina Nikolayevna Pestova
- Other names: Marina Akbarov
- Born: 20 December 1964 (age 61) Sverdlovsk, Russian SFSR, Soviet Union

Figure skating career
- Country: Soviet Union
- Began skating: 1968
- Retired: 1983
Medal record
Representing Soviet Union
Pairs' Figure skating
World Championships
Silver medal – second place	1982 Copenhagen	Pairs
Bronze medal – third place	1980 Dortmund	Pairs
European Championships
Silver medal – second place	1982 Lyon	Pairs
Bronze medal – third place	1980 Gothenburg	Pairs

Marina Nikolayevna Pestova, married surname: Akbarov, (Russian: Марина Николаевна Пестова, born 20 December 1964) is a former pair skater who competed for the Soviet Union. With her skating partner, Stanislav Leonovich, she became a two-time World medalist (silver in 1982, bronze in 1980), a two-time European medalist (silver in 1982, bronze in 1980), and a three-time Soviet national champion. The pair competed at the 1980 Winter Olympics, placing fourth.

== Personal life ==
Pestova was born on 20 December 1964 in Sverdlovsk, Russian SFSR, Soviet Union. She married fellow pair skater Marat Akbarov, with whom she has a daughter, Angela.

== Career ==
=== Early years ===
Pestova began skating in 1968 at the Spartak Skating Club in Sverdlovsk (now Yekaterinburg) with coach Igor Ksenofontov. She moved to Moscow in 1976 to train with Stanislav Zhuk. In the 1976–77 season, she competed in partnership with Mikhail Vazhenin.

=== Partnership with Leonovich ===
Pestova teamed up with Stanislav Leonovich in 1977. In the 1977–78 season, they won silver at the Soviet Championships and were granted their European and World Championship debuts, placing 7th at both competitions. They began the next season by winning gold at the Prize of Moscow News. They placed fourth at Europeans and 5th at Worlds in 1979.

In the 1979–80 season, Pestova/Leonovich won their first national title and went on to win bronze at the 1980 European Championships. The pair was sent to the 1980 Winter Olympics in Lake Placid and finished fourth. They were bronze medalists at their final event of the season, the 1980 World Championships.

The following season, Pestova/Leonovich placed fourth at the Soviet Championships and did not receive any assignments. They rebounded in 1981–82, taking their second national title and then winning silver at both the 1982 European Championships and 1982 World Championships.

In their final competitive season, Pestova/Leonovich won their third national title and placed sixth at the 1983 World Championships.

=== Post-competitive ===
After retiring from competition, Pestova performed with the Russian All Stars under the direction of Tatiana Tarasova. She now coaches at the Wheaton Ice Skating Academy in Wheaton, Maryland.

== Competitive highlights ==
=== With Leonovich ===
International
Event	77–78	78–79	79–80	80–81	81–82	82–83
Winter Olympics			4th			
World Champ.	7th	5th	3rd		2nd	6th
European Champ.	7th	4th	3rd		2nd	
Prize of Moscow News		1st				
National
Soviet Champ.	2nd	2nd	1st	4th	1st	1st

=== With Vazhenin ===
International
Event	1976–77
Prize of Moscow News	6th
