= Galina Karelina =

Soviet pair skater

Personal information
- Born: 23 November 1950 (age 75)

Figure skating career
- Country: Soviet Union

Galina Karelina (Russian: Галина Карелина) (born 23 November 1950) is a former pair skater who competed for the Soviet Union. With partner Georgi Proskurin, she is the 1971 European bronze medalist.

== Results ==
(with Proskurin)

International
Event	67–68	68–69	69–70	70–71	71–72
World Championships			4th	8th	
European Champ.			4th	3rd	
Prize of Moscow News	3rd			2nd	3rd
Winter Universiade			2nd		
National
Soviet Championships			3rd	3rd	
