= Sergey Volkov (figure skater) =

Soviet figure skater

Personal information
- Native name: Sergey Nikolayevich Volkov
- Born: 19 April 1949 Moscow, Russian SFSR, Soviet Union
- Died: 31 August 1990 (aged 41) Kharkiv, Ukrainian SSR, Soviet Union
- Height: 1.73 m (5 ft 8 in)

Figure skating career
- Country: Soviet Union
- Coach: Viktor Kudriavtsev (1959–1975); Stanislav Zhuk (1976–1978)
- Skating club: Spartak Moscow; Soviet Army Moscow
Medal record
Representing the Soviet Union
World Championships
Gold medal – first place	1975 Colorado Springs	Men's singles
Silver medal – second place	1974 Munich	Men's singles
European Championships
Silver medal – second place	1974 Zagreb	Men's singles

Sergey Nikolayevich Volkov (Russian: Сергей Николаевич Волков; 19 April 1949 – 31 August 1990) was a Soviet figure skater. He won the 1975 World title and placed second in 1974.

== Personal life ==
Volkov was born on 19 April 1949 in Moscow. He was the brother of Elena Buriak, an international skating referee. With his first wife, Lyudmila, he had a son, Aleksandr, and with his second wife, Oksana, he had twin daughters, Ekaterina and Anastasia.

Volkov dreamed of becoming a pilot and tried twice to enter the flight academy in Rostov-on-Don. He failed the medical test both times due to his weak knees and ankles, which would fail upon landing after a parachute jump. For the same reason, he struggled with landing his jumps throughout his skating career.

He died from stomach cancer on 31 August 1990 in Kharkiv and was buried in Kuntsevo Cemetery in Moscow.

== Career ==
Volkov debuted at the 1968 European Championship, and placed 12th. In 1974, he won the silver medal at the European and World Championships. Volkov won the individual world title in 1975, becoming the first Soviet man to do so. Domestically he won two Soviet titles, in 1974 and 1976.

Volkov participated in eight European and four World Championships. He was unbeatable in special and compulsory figures. After retiring from competition he worked as a figure skating coach, and spent four months in Austria in 1990 in this capacity.

== Results ==
International
Event	67–68	68–69	69–70	70–71	71–72	72–73	73–74	74–75	75–76	76–77	77–78
Olympics	18th								5th		
Worlds			7th		10th		2nd	1st			
Europeans	12th	7th	5th	6th		5th	2nd	4th	5th		
Universiade			3rd								
Moscow News	2nd		1st	2nd	3rd			2nd		3rd	2nd
National
Soviet Champ.	4th	3rd	2nd	2nd	2nd	3rd	1st	2nd	1st	3rd	5th
