= Yuri Ovchinnikov (figure skater) =

Soviet figure skater

Personal information
- Native name: Юрий Львович Овчинников
- Full name: Yuri Levovich Ovchinnikov
- Born: 3 June 1950 (age 76) Leningrad, Soviet Union
- Home town: San Diego, California

Figure skating career
- Country: Soviet Union
- Retired: 1978
Medal record
Representing the Soviet Union
Figure skating: Men's singles
European Championships
Bronze medal – third place	1975 Copenhagen	Men's singles

Yuri Lvovich Ovchinnikov (Russian: Юрий Львович Овчинников; born 3 June 1950 in Leningrad) is a Russian figure skating coach and former competitor for the Soviet Union. He is the 1975 European bronze medalist, 1976 Prize of Moscow News champion, and 1975 Soviet national champion. He represented the Soviet Union at the 1972 Winter Olympics, where he placed 12th, and at the 1976 Winter Olympics, where he placed 8th.

As a coach, he led Igor Bobrin to the 1981 European title and 1981 World bronze medal. He is a coach and choreographer for Team del Sol, a synchronized skating team in San Diego, California.

Ovchinnikov has two children.

== Results ==
International
Event	67–68	68–69	69–70	70–71	71–72	72–73	73–74	74–75	75–76	76–77	77–78
Olympics					12th				8th		
Worlds		11th		7th		6th		6th		7th	
Europeans		9th	7th	5th	7th	6th	5th	3rd	4th	4th	5th
Moscow News			3rd	4th				4th	2nd	1st	
National
Soviet Champ.	5th	5th	3rd	3rd	4th	2nd	2nd	1st	2nd	2nd	4th
