= Georgi Proskurin =

Soviet pair skater (1945–2004)

Personal information
- Full name: Georgi Ermolayevich Proskurin
- Born: 13 June 1945 Moscow, Soviet Union
- Died: 10 July 2004 (aged 59)

Figure skating career
- Country: Soviet Union
Medal record
Representing Soviet Union
Pairs' Figure skating
European Championships
Bronze medal – third place	1971 Zürich	Pairs

Georgi Ermolayevich Proskurin (Russian: Георгий Ермолаевич Проскурин; 13 June 1945 – 10 July 2004) was a Soviet pair skater. He was born in Moscow. With Galina Karelina, he is the 1971 European bronze medalist. With Tatiana Tarasova, he won the 1966 Winter Universiade, which he repeated again in 1972 with Karelina. In total, he is a five-time Soviet national medalist with Karelina, Tarasova, and Galina Sedova.

== Competitive highlights ==
=== With Karelina ===
International
Event	67–68	68–69	69–70	70–71	71–72
World Championships			4th	8th	
European Champ.			4th	3rd	
Prize of Moscow News	3rd			2nd	3rd
Winter Universiade			2nd		1st
National
Soviet Championships			3rd	3rd	

=== With Tarasova ===
International
Event	1963–64	1964–65	1965–66
World Championships		7th	
European Championships		6th	4th
Winter Universiade			1st
Prague Skate		3rd	
National
Soviet Championships	3rd	2nd	

=== With Sedova ===
International
Event	1960	1963
European Championships		12th
National
Soviet Championships	2nd	3rd
