= Viacheslav Zhigalin =

Personal information
- Full name: Viacheslav Vladimirovich Zhigalin
- Born: 27 February 1950 (age 76)

Figure skating career
- Country: Soviet Union

Viacheslav Vladimirovich Zhigalin (Russian: Вячесла́в Влади́мирович Жигалин; born 27 February 1950) is a former ice dancer who competed for the Soviet Union. With partner Tatiana Voitiuk, he is the 1970 European bronze medalist and 1972 Soviet national champion. With partner Lidia Karavaeva he won the bronze medal at the 1975 Prize of Moscow News.

== Results ==
=== With Voitiuk ===
International
Event	68–69	69–70	70–71	71–72	72–73
World Championships	14th	4th	5th	5th	5th
European Championships	10th	3rd	4th	5th	5th
Prize of Moscow News			2nd		
National
Soviet Championships	2nd	2nd	2nd	1st	2nd

=== With Karavaeva ===
International
Event	1974–75	1975–76	1976–77	1977–78
Prize of Moscow News	4th	3rd		
National
Soviet Championships			4th	4th
