= Vladimir Kotin =

Soviet figure skater (born 1962)

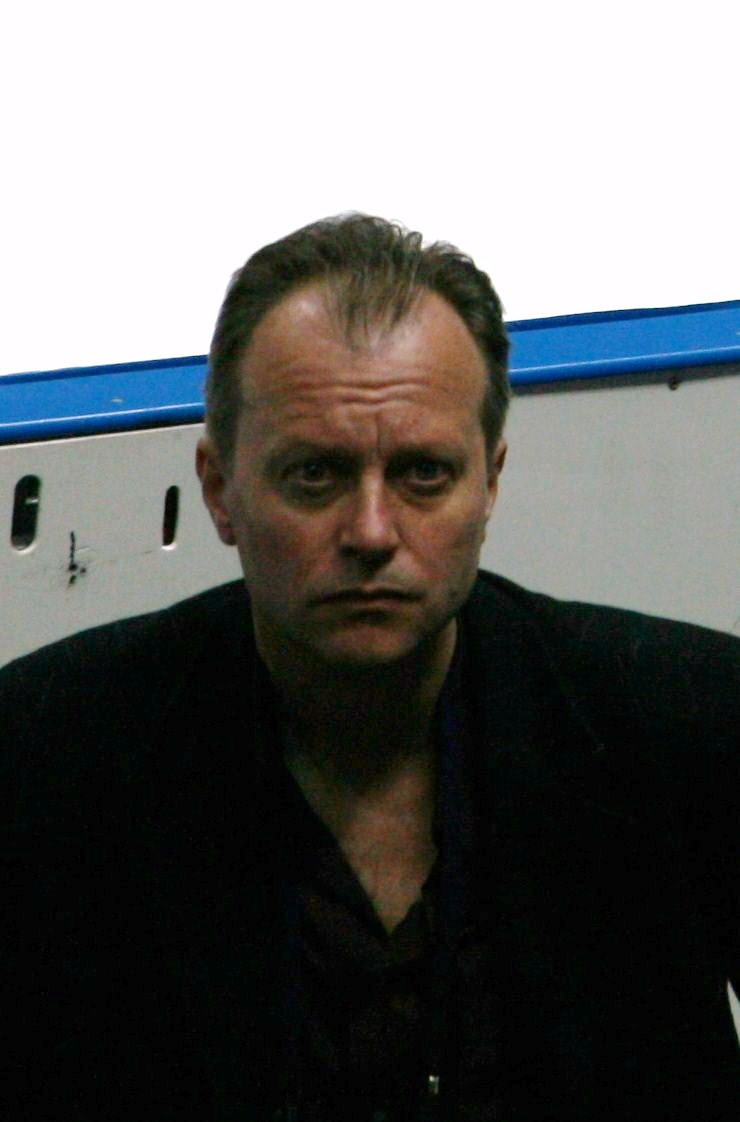
- Vladimir Kotin in 2011

Personal information
- Full name: Vladimir Grigorievich Kotin
- Born: 28 March 1962 (age 64) Moscow, Russian SFSR, Soviet Union
- Height: 1.75 m (5 ft 9 in)

Figure skating career
- Country: Soviet Union
- Retired: 1988
Medal record
Representing the Soviet Union
Men's figure skating
European Championships
Silver medal – second place	1985 Gothenburg	Men's singles
Silver medal – second place	1986 Copenhagen	Men's singles
Silver medal – second place	1987 Sarajevo	Men's singles
Silver medal – second place	1988 Prague	Men's singles
World Junior Championships
Silver medal – second place	1978 Megève	Men's singles

Vladimir Grigorievich Kotin (Russian: Владимир Григорьевич Котин; born 28 March 1962) is a former competitive figure skater who represented the Soviet Union. He is a four-time European silver medalist (1985–88), the 1978 World Junior silver medalist, and the 1985 Soviet national champion. Kotin competed at the 1984 Winter Olympics, where he placed eighth, and at the 1988 Winter Olympics, where he placed sixth. He now works as a coach in collaboration with Elena Tchaikovskaia.

== Results ==
International
Event	1977–78	1978–79	1979–80	1980–81	1981–82	1982–83	1983–84	1984–85	1985–86	1986–87	1987–88
Olympics							8th				6th
Worlds				9th	11th	9th	8th	5th	4th	4th	
Europeans				6th	7th	5th	6th	2nd	2nd	2nd	2nd
NHK Trophy			8th								
Moscow News	5th		2nd		1st	2nd	1st	2nd	2nd	1st	
International: Junior
Junior Worlds	2nd										
National
Soviet Champ.		3rd	2nd	3rd	2nd	7th		1st			3rd
