= Stanislav Zhuk =

Soviet figure skater

Personal information
- Full name: Stanislav Alekseyevich Zhuk
- Born: 25 January 1935 Ulyanovsk, RSFSR, Soviet Union
- Died: 1 November 1998 (aged 63) Moscow, Russia

Figure skating career
- Country: Soviet Union
- Coach: Pyotr Orlov
- Skating club: Dynamo, Leningrad
- Retired: 1961
Medal record
Representing Soviet Union
Pairs' Figure skating
European Championships
| Silver medal – second place | 1960 Garmisch-Partenkirchen | Pairs |
| Silver medal – second place | 1959 Davos | Pairs |
| Silver medal – second place | 1958 Bratislava | Pairs |

Stanislav Alekseyevich Zhuk (Russian: Станислав Алексеевич Жук,; 25 January 1935 – 1 November 1998) was a pair skater who represented the Soviet Union. With his wife Nina, he won three silver medals at the European Figure Skating Championships and finished sixth at the 1960 Winter Olympics.

He later went on to a long career as a coach. Among the pairs he coached were Olympic gold medalists Irina Rodnina and Alexander Zaitsev and Ekaterina Gordeeva and Sergei Grinkov. Tatyana Zhuk was his younger sister.

== Biography ==
A native Siberian, his father, Aleksey Zhuk, returned to Ulyanovsk together with his friend Pavel Dementyev after he finished Marine military service. They were neighbors, and Aleksey met Pavel's sister Maria. They immediately fell in love and soon married. Stanislav Zhuk was born on 25 January 1935 into a family of naval officers in Ulyanovsk. This military life caused the family to move a lot.

The sport of figure skating underwent a revival in late-1940s Leningrad, and Stanislav started skating. Many of the most promising students of the Pioneers Palace section were in the department of Dinamo physical culture and sports club. The most powerful Soviet Union figure skating team formed there under the leadership of coach Peter Orlov, the Master of Sports. Orlov met Stanislav while he was studying in the physical training college. He offered him a skating partnership with Nina Bakusheva, a ladies singles skater from Leningrad.

They began their partnership in the late 1950s. Stanislav was a very ambitious skater, whose motto was "If it's necessary, it's a must!" He wouldn't leave the ice rink if he didn't accomplish what he had planned during his training sessions. The coach trusted him with preparation of performance programs and training.

In 10 years the pair won three silver medals at the European Championships and were four-time Champions of the Soviet Union. This began an era of Soviet figure skating victories worldwide.

The pair performed elements during the European Championships which were deemed illegal by judges because they considered them too dangerous. "I was told that it was acrobatics. Remembering this makes me laugh. Time has passed, but the medals will never be gold," Stanislav responded. No skating team had ever performed moves with a one-handed hold before. This element is performed with direct hands in comparison with other pairs who performed it with bent hands. Mass media made a fuss about the new elements Zhuk and his partner performed, but these "dangerous" elements were considered highly professional only a year later.

They were the first Soviet skating pair to participate in the Winter Olympics, in the Games in Squaw Valley, California, in 1960. Nina and Stanislav Zhuk's best finishes were second in later European and World championships.

They claimed to be the world best skating pair in 1961 because of their unique program, but never got the chance to compete that year. The 1961 World Championships were cancelled after the United States National Skating Team was killed in a plane crash en route to the competition in Prague. Nina and Stanislav decided to finish their professional career and join the Moscow State Ballet on Ice.

Zhuk attended the 1962 World Championship in Prague as Ludmila Belousova and Oleg Protopopov's coach. His choreography helped them win a silver medal. Zhuk also sacrificed his own rehearsals and performances in the Moscow State Ballet on Ice to help prepare his sister Tatyana for competition. She skated first with Aleksandr Gavrilov, then Aleksandr Gorelick.

Zhuk became a coach for the Central Army Sports Club. He took Aleksandr Gorelick and Tatyana onto his team and they were accepted onto the Soviet Union national team nine months later. They were the 1965 World and European bronze medalists and the 1966 silver medalists. They won a silver medal at the 1968 Winter Olympics.

This marked the beginning of Stanislav Zhuk's coaching career, during which he trained numerous internationally recognized figure skaters across all disciplines of the sport. Among the athletes he coached were Irina Rodnina, who holds the record for the most World and Olympic championship titles in figure skating history, and Elena Vodorezova, the first Soviet woman to win a silver medal at the European Championships.

Stanislav Zhuk trainees won 67 gold, 36 silver and 35 bronze medals at the Olympic Games and World and European Championships. Marina Cherkasova and Sergei Shakhrai, Marina Pestova and Stanislav Leonovich, Ekaterina Gordeeva and Sergei Grinkov were among the last of many notable Zhuk pupils. Zhuk caused controversy in his later years, particularly with Gordeeva and Grinkov, and was eventually quietly deposed at the Soviet skating club.

Stanislav Zhuk died of a heart attack on 1 November 1998 at the Moscow subway station "Aeroport." This is not far from CSKA, where he produced so many champions. Trainees and admirers visit his grave at Vagankovo Cemetery every year.

19 November 2008 there was the opening of the monument to Stanislav Zhuk, the outstanding professional figure-skating coach, on the CSKA.

== Competitive highlights ==
(with Zhuk)

| Event | 1954 | 1955 | 1956 | 1957 | 1958 | 1959 | 1960 | 1961 |
|---|---|---|---|---|---|---|---|---|
| Winter Olympic Games | | | | | | | 6th | |
| World Championships | | | | | 8th | | 5th | |
| European Championships | | | | 6th | 2nd | 2nd | 2nd | |
| Soviet Championships | 3rd | | 3rd | 1st | 1st | 1st | | 1st |
