= Igor Lisovsky =

Soviet pair skater

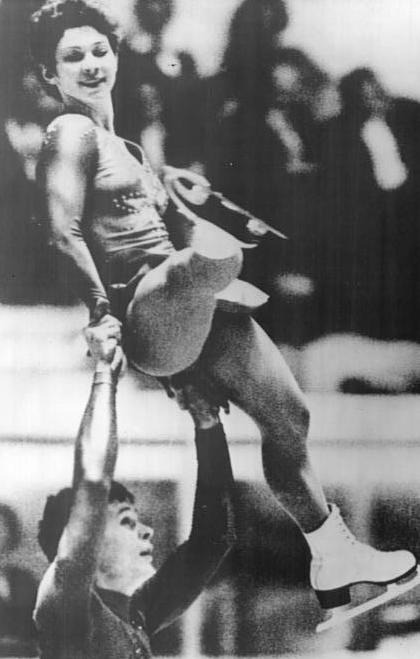
- Lisovsky with Vorobieva in October 1979

Personal information
- Full name: Igor Olegovich Lisovsky
- Other names: Lisovski, Lisovskiy
- Born: June 25, 1954 (age 72)

Figure skating career
- Country: Soviet Union
- Retired: 1983
Medal record
Representing Soviet Union
Pairs' Figure skating
World Championships
Gold medal – first place	1981 Hartford	Pairs
European Championships
Bronze medal – third place	1982 Lyon	Pairs
Gold medal – first place	1981 Innsbruck	Pairs
Silver medal – second place	1979 Zagreb	Pairs

Igor Olegovich Lisovsky (Russian: Игорь Олегович Лисовский; born on 25 June 1954) is a former Soviet pair skater. With his then-wife Irina Vorobieva, he is the 1981 World champion and the 1981 European champion. They were coached by Tamara Moskvina.

He currently coaches in Missouri.

== Programs ==
(with Vorobieva)

Season	Short program	Long program	Exhibition
1980–1981		The Star and Death of Joaquin Murrieta ( Звезда и смерть Хоакина Мурьеты ) by Alexey Rybnikov and Pavel Grushko	

== Competitive highlights ==
=== With Vorobieva ===
Event	1978–79	1979–80	1980–81	1981–82	1982–83
World Championships	4th		1st	5th	
European Championships	2nd		1st	3rd	
Soviet Championships	3rd	2nd	2nd	3rd	5th
NHK Trophy		1st			2nd
Prize of Moscow News	3rd	1st	1st		

=== With Skurikhina ===
Event	1977–78
Spartakiada	8th

=== Singles career ===
International
Event	1972–73	1973–74
World Championships	16th	
Blue Swords	4th	
National
Soviet Championships	5th	6th

== Coaching ==
Lisovsky currently coaches at Brentwood Ice Arena in St. Louis, Missouri. He has received the St. Louis Youth Coach of the Year award from the St. Louis Sports Commission.
