= Irina Vorobieva =

Russian pair skater (1958–2022)

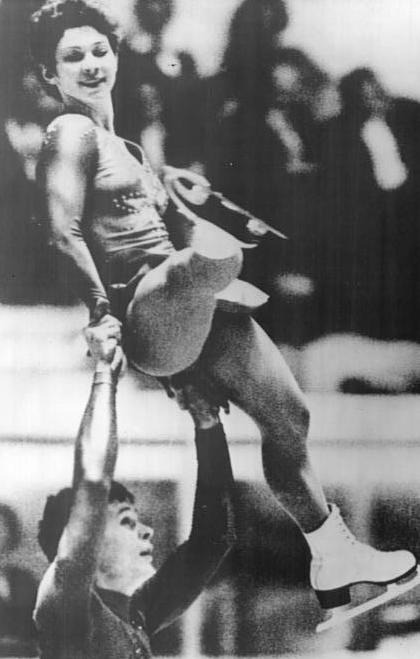
- Vorobieva with Lisovsky in 1979

Personal information
- Full name: Irina Nikolayevna Vorobieva
- Other names: Vorobiova
- Born: 30 June 1958 Leningrad, Russian SFSR, USSR
- Died: 12 April 2022 (aged 63) Colorado Springs, Colorado, U.S.

Figure skating career
- Country: Soviet Union
- Skating club: Trud Leningrad
- Retired: 1983
Medal record
Representing Soviet Union
Pairs' Figure skating
World Championships
Gold medal – first place	1981 Hartford	Pairs
Silver medal – second place	1977 Tokyo	Pairs
Bronze medal – third place	1976 Gothenburg	Pairs
European Championships
Bronze medal – third place	1982 Lyon	Pairs
Gold medal – first place	1981 Innsbruck	Pairs
Silver medal – second place	1979 Zagreb	Pairs
Silver medal – second place	1977 Helsinki	Pairs
Bronze medal – third place	1976 Geneva	Pairs

Irina Nikolayevna Vorobieva (Russian: Ирина Николаевна Воробьёва; 30 June 1958 – 12 April 2022) was a Russian pair skater who competed for the Soviet Union. With her then-husband Igor Lisovsky, she was the 1981 World champion and the 1981 European champion. They were coached by Tamara Moskvina.

Before teaming up with Lisovsky she had competed with Aleksandr Vlasov, with whom she was the 1976 World bronze medalist, 1976 World silver medalist; they placed 4th at the 1976 Olympics.

More recently she worked as a coach at the World Arena in Colorado Springs, Colorado. Among her students were Brittany Vise and Nicholas Kole, Tiffany Vise and Derek Trent, and Shelby Lyons and Brian Wells. She died at her home in Colorado Springs in 2022.

== Programs ==
(with Lisovsky)

Season	Short program	Long program	Exhibition
1980–1981		The Star and Death of Joaquin Murrieta ( Звезда и смерть Хоакина Мурьеты ) by Alexey Rybnikov and Pavel Grushko	

== Competitive highlights ==
=== With Vlasov ===
Event	1971–72	1972–73	1973–74	1974–75	1975–76	1976–77
Winter Olympics					4th	
World Championships			6th	4th	3rd	2nd
European Championships					3rd	2nd
Prize of Moscow News		1st			2nd	
Soviet Championships	2nd		3rd		1st	2nd
Spartakiada			3rd*			
USSR Cup	1st			2nd	2nd	

- 1974 Spartakiada results used for Soviet Nationals

=== With Lisovsky ===
Event	1978–79	1979–80	1980–81	1981–82	1982–83
World Championships	4th		1st	5th	
European Championships	2nd		1st	3rd	
Soviet Championships	3rd	2nd	2nd	3rd	5th
NHK Trophy		1st			2nd
Prize of Moscow News	3rd	1st	1st		
