= 1984 Prize of Moscow News =

- Date: December 5 – 9
- Season: 1984-85
- Location: Moscow

Champions
- Men's singles: Alexandre Fadeev (URS)
- Ladies' singles: Kira Ivanova (URS)
- Pairs: Larisa Selezneva / Oleg Makarov (URS)
- Ice dance: Marina Klimova / Sergei Ponomarenko (URS)
- Previous: 1983 Prize of Moscow News
- Next: 1985 Prize of Moscow News

The 1984 Prize of Moscow News was the 19th edition of an international figure skating competition organized in Moscow, Soviet Union. It was held December 5–9, 1984. Medals were awarded in the disciplines of men's singles, ladies' singles, pair skating and ice dancing. The men's category was won by European champion Alexandre Fadeev, who would end his season with the world title. The ladies' gold medal went to Olympic medalist Kira Ivanova, winning her fourth Prize of Moscow News title. Olympic medalists Larisa Selezneva / Oleg Makarov took the pairs' title, earning their second win at the Prize of Moscow News. In the ice dancing category, Olympic bronze medalists Marina Klimova / Sergei Ponomarenko defeated the Olympic silver medalists Natalia Bestemianova / Andrei Bukin.

== Men ==
Rank	Name	Nation
1	Alexandre Fadeev	Soviet Union
2	Vladimir Kotin	Soviet Union
3	Viktor Petrenko	Soviet Union
4		
5	Leonid Kaznakov	Soviet Union
6	Falko Kirsten	East Germany
...		
9		
10		
11	André Bourgeois	Canada
12	Gordon Forbes	Canada
...		
14	Ralph Burghart	Austria
...		
20	Andrea Soviano	Italy

== Ladies ==
Rank	Name	Nation
1	Kira Ivanova	Soviet Union
2	Natalia Lebedeva	Soviet Union
3	Anna Kondrashova	Soviet Union
4	Anna Antonova	Soviet Union
5	Marina Serova	Soviet Union
6	Inna Krundysheva	Soviet Union
7	Marina Tveretinova	Soviet Union
...		
11	Merriam Twin	Canada
...		
15	Alina Ahonen	Finland

== Pairs ==
Rank	Name	Nation
1	Larisa Selezneva / Oleg Makarov	Soviet Union
2	Veronika Pershina / Marat Akbarov	Soviet Union
3	Elena Bechke / Valeri Kornienko	Soviet Union
...		
10	Linda Ivanich / John Ivanich	Canada

== Ice dancing ==
Rank	Name	Nation
1	Marina Klimova / Sergei Ponomarenko	Soviet Union
2	Natalia Bestemianova / Andrei Bukin	Soviet Union
3	Olga Volozhinskaya / Alexander Svinin	Soviet Union
4	Natalia Annenko / Genrich Sretenski	Soviet Union
...
8	Isabelle Duchesnay / Paul Duchesnay	Canada
...		
10	Sophie Mérigot / Philippe Berthe	France
