= 1985 Prize of Moscow News =

- Date: December 4 – 8
- Season: 1985-86
- Location: Moscow

Champions
- Men's singles: Alexandre Fadeev (URS)
- Ladies' singles: Caryn Kadavy (USA)
- Pairs: Larisa Selezneva / Oleg Makarov (URS)
- Ice dance: Natalia Bestemianova / Andrei Bukin (URS)
- Previous: 1984 Prize of Moscow News
- Next: 1986 Prize of Moscow News

The 1985 Prize of Moscow News was the 20th edition of an international figure skating competition organized in Moscow, Soviet Union. It was held December 4–8, 1985. Medals were awarded in the disciplines of men's singles, ladies' singles, pair skating and ice dancing. Soviet skaters swept the men's podium, led by world champion Alexandre Fadeev. American Caryn Kadavy won the ladies' category ahead of Anna Kondrashova. Olympic bronze medalists Larisa Selezneva / Oleg Makarov took the pairs' title. The ice dancing event featured Olympic medalists Natalia Bestemianova / Andrei Bukin and Marina Klimova / Sergei Ponomarenko, who would take gold and silver respectively.

== Men ==
Rank	Name	Nation
1	Alexandre Fadeev	Soviet Union
2	Vladimir Kotin	Soviet Union
3	Vitali Egorov	Soviet Union
4	Christopher Bowman	United States
5	Leonid Kaznakov	Soviet Union
6	Gurgen Vardanjan	Soviet Union
7	Falko Kirsten	East Germany
8	Ralf Lewandowski	East Germany
9	Dmitri Gromov	Soviet Union
10	Andrei Torosian	Soviet Union
11		
12	Jaimee Eggleton	Canada
...		
19	Stephen Carr	Australia
20		

== Ladies ==
Rank	Name	Nation	TFP	CF	SP	FS
1	Caryn Kadavy	United States				
2	Anna Kondrashova	Soviet Union				
3	Natalia Lebedeva	Soviet Union				
4	Tracey Wainman	Canada		1	4	5
5	Inna Krundysheva	Soviet Union				
6	Nathalie Sasseville	Canada				
7	Larisa Zamotina	Soviet Union				
8	Ingrid Karl	West Germany				
9	Parthena Sarafidis	Austria				
10	Tamara Teglassy	Hungary				
...						
13	Joanna O'Sullivan	Australia				
14						

== Pairs ==
Rank	Name	Nation
1	Larisa Selezneva / Oleg Makarov	Soviet Union
2	Veronika Pershina / Marat Akbarov	Soviet Union
3	Elena Bechke / Valeri Kornienko	Soviet Union
4	Ekaterina Gordeeva / Sergei Grinkov	Soviet Union
5	Elena Kvitchenko / Rashid Kadyrkaev	Soviet Union
6	Yulia Bystrova / Alexander Tarasov	Soviet Union
7	Lyudmila Koblova / Andrei Kalitin	Soviet Union
8	Peggy Schwarz / Alexander König	East Germany
9	Karen Courtland / Robert Daw	United States
10	Svetlana Frantsuzova / Oleg Gorshkov	Soviet Union
11	Irina Klimova / Yuri Kvashnin	Soviet Union
12	Galina Sorokina / Igor Guenko	Soviet Union
13	Danielle McGrath / Stephen Carr	Australia

== Ice dancing ==
Rank	Name	Nation
1	Natalia Bestemianova / Andrei Bukin	Soviet Union
2	Marina Klimova / Sergei Ponomarenko	Soviet Union
3	Natalia Annenko / Genrich Sretenski	Soviet Union
4	Maya Usova / Alexander Zhulin	Soviet Union
5	Olga Volozhinskaya / Alexander Svinin	Soviet Union
6	Irina Zhuk / Oleg Petrov	Soviet Union
7	Kathrin Beck / Christoff Beck	Austria
8	Svetlana Liapina / Gorsha Sur	Soviet Union
9	Susan Wynne / Joseph Druar	United States
10	Isabelle Cousin / Martial Mette	France
11	Kim Hanford / Julian LaLonde	Canada
...		
