= 1966 Prize of Moscow News =

- Date: December 15 – 18
- Season: 1966-67
- Location: Moscow

Champions
- Men's singles: Ondrej Nepela (TCH)
- Ladies' singles: Martina Clausner (GDR)
- Pairs: Tamara Moskvina / Alexei Mishin (URS)
- Ice dance: Irina Grishkova / Viktor Ryzhkin (URS)
- Next: 1967 Prize of Moscow News

The 1966 Prize of Moscow News was the first edition of an annual international figure skating competition organized in Moscow, Soviet Union. It was held December 15–18, 1966. Medals were awarded in the disciplines of men's singles, ladies' singles, pair skating and ice dancing. Czechoslovakia's Ondrej Nepela won the men's title ahead of East Germany's Günter Zöller and the Soviet Union's Vladimir Kurenbin. Martina Clausner of East Germany defeated Hungary's Zsuzsa Szentmiklossy for the ladies' title. Soviet skaters swept the pairs' podium, led by Tamara Moskvina / Alexei Mishin. The ice dancing title was won by Soviets Irina Grishkova / Viktor Ryzhkin.

== Results ==
=== Men ===
Rank	Name	Nation
1	Ondrej Nepela	Czechoslovakia
2	Günter Zöller	East Germany
3	Vladimir Kurenbin	Soviet Union
4	Valeri Meshkov	Soviet Union
5	Sergei Chetverukhin	Soviet Union
6	Alexander Vedenin	Soviet Union
...		

=== Ladies ===
Rank	Name	Nation
1	Martina Clausner	East Germany
2	Zsuzsa Szentmiklossy	Hungary
3	Sybille Stolfig	East Germany
4	Elena Shcheglova	Soviet Union
5	Marie Vichova	Czechoslovakia
...		

=== Pairs ===
Rank	Name	Nation
1	Tamara Moskvina / Alexei Mishin	Soviet Union
2	Tatiana Sharanova / Anatoli Evdokimov	Soviet Union
3	Ludmila Smirnova / Andrei Suraikin	Soviet Union
4	Marianne Mirmsecker / Peter Göbel	East Germany
...		

=== Ice dancing ===
Rank	Name	Nation
1	Irina Grishkova / Viktor Ryzhkin	Soviet Union
2	Annerose Baier / Eberhard Rüger	East Germany
3	Dana Novotná / Jaroslav Hainz	Czechoslovakia
...		
