= Marina Sanaya =

Russian figure skater (1959–2016)

Personal information
- Full name: Marina Valterovna Sanaya
- Other names: Marina Melnyk
- Born: 7 January 1959 Moscow, Russian SFSR, Soviet Union
- Died: 6 October 2016 (aged 57) Englewood, Colorado, U.S.

Figure skating career
- Country: Soviet Union
- Coach: Nina Zhuk, Sergei Chetverukhin, Aleksandr Gorelik
- Skating club: CSKA Moscow
- Retired: 1975

Marina Valterovna Sanaya (Melnyk) (Russian: Марина Вальтеровна Саная (Мельник); 7 January 1959 – 6 October 2016) was a Russian figure skating official and competitor who represented the Soviet Union. Competing at the age of 13, she placed 18th at the 1972 Winter Olympics.

== Life and career ==
Born in Moscow, Marina Sanaya was the daughter of Walter Sanaya, who served as a football goalkeeper for FC Dynamo Moscow and FC Dinamo Tbilisi in the 1950s. She started skating at the age of six at CSKA Moscow.

At age 13, Sanaya represented the Soviet Union at the 1972 European Championships in Gothenburg, where she placed 23rd, and at the 1972 Winter Olympics in Sapporo, where she ranked 18th. The following season, she finished 11th at the 1973 European Championships in Cologne and 16th at the 1973 World Championships in Bratislava. Her coaches included Nina Zhuk, Sergei Chetverukhin, and Aleksandr Gorelik.

Following her retirement from competition, Sanaya became a skating official and served as a judge, technical controller, and referee. She was the judge for Russia during the pairs event at the 2002 Winter Olympics.

Sanaya was honored at the Ice Theatre of New York's annual benefit gala in 2008. She died in October 2016.

== Competitive highlights ==
International
Event	71–72	72–73	73–74	74–75	75–76
Winter Olympics	18th				
World Championships	21st	16th			
European Champ.	23rd	11th	21st		
Prague Skate					6th
National
Soviet Championships		2nd		4th	
