= 1985 European Figure Skating Championships =

Figure skating competition

1985 European Championships
- Type: ISU Championship
- Date: February 4 – 10
- Season: 1984–85
- Location: Gothenburg, Sweden
- Venue: Scandinavium

Champions
- Men's singles: (Czechoslovakia) Jozef Sabovčík
- Ladies' singles: (East Germany) Katarina Witt
- Pairs: (Soviet Union) Elena Valova / Oleg Vasiliev
- Ice dance: (Soviet Union) Natalia Bestemianova / Andrei Bukin
- Previous: 1984 European Championships
- Next: 1986 European Championships

The 1985 European Figure Skating Championships was a senior-level international competition held at the Scandinavium in Gothenburg, Sweden from February 4 to 10. Elite skaters from European ISU member nations competed in the disciplines of men's singles, ladies' singles, pair skating, and ice dancing.

== Results ==
=== Men ===
Rank	Name	Nation	TFP	CF	SP	FS
1	Jozef Sabovčík	Czechoslovakia	3.6	2	1	2
2	Vladimir Kotin	Soviet Union	4.2	4	2	1
3	Grzegorz Filipowski	Poland	7.6	5	4	3
4	Heiko Fischer	West Germany	9.0	3	8	4
5	Falko Kirsten	East Germany	12.4	9	5	5
6	Viktor Petrenko	Soviet Union	14.0	8	3	8
7	Fernand Fédronic	France	14.4	1	7	11
8	Richard Zander	West Germany	14.8	7	9	7
9	Lars Åkesson	Sweden	15.0	6	6	9
10	Petr Barna	Czechoslovakia	16.0	10	10	6
11	Alessandro Riccitelli	Italy	23.5			
12	Nils Köpp	East Germany	25.0			
13	Ralf Burghart	Austria	27.0			
14	Lars Dresler	Denmark	28.2			
15	Stephen Pickavance	United Kingdom	29.2			
16	Oula Jääskeläinen	Finland	34.4			
17	Wojciech Gwinner	Poland	36.0			
18	Imre Raábe	Hungary	36.8			
19	Ed van Campen	Netherlands	37.6			
20	Fernando Soria	Spain				
WD	Oliver Höner	Switzerland				

=== Ladies ===
Rank	Name	Nation	TFP	CF	OP	FS
1	Katarina Witt	East Germany	3.2	1	4	1
2	Kira Ivanova	Soviet Union				
3	Claudia Leistner	West Germany				
4	Simone Koch	East Germany				
5	Anna Kondrashova	Soviet Union				
6	Natalia Lebedeva	Soviet Union				
7	Claudia Villiger	Switzerland				
8	Patricia Neske	West Germany				
9	Agnès Gosselin	France				
10	Susan Jackson	United Kingdom				
11	Sandra Cariboni	Switzerland				
12	Constanze Gensel	East Germany				
13	Lotta Falkenbäck	Sweden				
14	Elise Ahonen	Finland				
15	Tamara Téglássy	Hungary				
16	Katrien Pauwels	Belgium				
17	Florence Copp	France				
18	Sabine Paal	Austria				
19	Beatrice Gelmini	Italy				
20	Paola Tosi	Italy				
21	Connie Sjoholm-Jorgensem	Denmark				
22	Nevenka Lisak	Yugoslavia				
23	Vibeke Sørensen	Norway				
24	Gabriela Ballová	Czechoslovakia				
25	Tjin Li Wang	Netherlands				
26	Marta Olozagarre	Spain				

=== Pairs ===
Rank	Name	Nation
1	Elena Valova / Oleg Vasiliev	Soviet Union
2	Larisa Selezneva / Oleg Makarov	Soviet Union
3	Veronika Pershina / Marat Akbarov	Soviet Union
4	Birgit Lorenz / Knut Schubert	East Germany
5	Manuela Landgraf / Ingo Steuer	East Germany
6	Claudia Massari / Daniele Caprano	West Germany
7	Lenka Knapová / René Novotný	Czechoslovakia
WD	Dagmar Kovarova / Jozef Komar	Czechoslovakia

=== Ice dancing ===
Rank	Name	Nation
1	Natalia Bestemianova / Andrei Bukin	Soviet Union
2	Marina Klimova / Sergei Ponomarenko	Soviet Union
3	Petra Born / Rainer Schönborn	West Germany
4	Karen Barber / Nicholas Slater	United Kingdom
5	Natalia Annenko / Genrikh Sretenski	Soviet Union
6	Kathrin Beck / Christoff Beck	Austria
7	Isabella Micheli / Roberto Pelizzola	Italy
8	Jindra Holá / Karol Foltán	Czechoslovakia
9	Klára Engi / Attila Tóth	Hungary
10	Antonia Becherer / Ferdinand Becherer	West Germany
11	Sharon Jones / Paul Askham	United Kingdom
12	Martine Olivier / Philippe Boissier	France
13	Brunhilde Bianchi / Walter Rizzo	Italy
14	Isabelle Cousin / Martial Mette	France
15	Gaby Schuppli / Markus Merz	Switzerland
16	Asa Agblad / Christer Thornell	Sweden
