= Maya Belenkaya =

Soviet figure skater (1931–2026)

Personal information
- Native name: Майя Петровна Беленькая
- Full name: Maya Petrovna Belenkaya
- Born: 1 May 1931 Leningrad, Russian SFSR, Soviet Union
- Died: 27 April 2026 (aged 94)

Figure skating career
- Country: Soviet Union
- Retired: 1958

Maya Petrovna Belenkaya (Russian: Майя Петровна Беленькая; 1 May 1931 – 27 April 2026) was a Soviet figure skater. With her partner Igor Moskvin, she became a three-time Soviet national champion (1952–1954).

== Background ==
Maya Belenkaya was born in Leningrad (now Saint Petersburg) on 1 May 1931. A resident of the city throughout her whole life, she survived the Siege of Leningrad and was awarded the Medal "For the Defence of Leningrad". Belenkaya died on 27 April 2026, at the age of 94.

== Career ==
Belenkaya started skating at the age of 12 at the Pioneers Palace. Her first coach was A. Zhdanov. She competed both in singles and pairs.

Belenkaya and Igor Moskvin won their first national medal, silver, in 1950. After another silver in 1951, they took gold for three consecutive years from 1952 to 1954 and then placed second behind Lidia Garasimova / Yuri Kiselev for the next two years. In 1956, Belenkaya/Moskvin were sent to their first and only European Championships and finished 11th at the event in Paris. In 1957 and 1958, they finished third at the Soviet Championships, behind Nina Zhuk / Stanislav Zhuk and Ludmila Belousova / Oleg Protopopov.

After retiring from competition, Belenkaya coached numerous singles and pairs skaters to national titles, most notably Alexei Mishin and Liudmila Smirnova / Andrei Suraikin.

== Results ==
=== Singles ===
Event	1950	1951	1952	1953
Soviet Championships	3rd	3rd	3rd	2nd

=== Pairs with Moskvin ===
Event	1950	1951	1952	1953	1954	1955	1956	1957	1958
European Champ.							11th		
Soviet Champ.	2nd	2nd	1st	1st	1st	2nd	2nd	3rd	3rd
