= 1981 World Junior Figure Skating Championships =

- Type: ISU Championship
- Date: December 8 – 14, 1980
- Season: 1980–81
- Location: London, Ontario, Canada
- Previous: 1980 World Junior Championships
- Next: 1982 World Junior Championships

The 1981 World Junior Figure Skating Championships were held on December 8–14, 1980 in London, Ontario, Canada. Commonly called "World Juniors" and "Junior Worlds", the event determined the World Junior champions in the disciplines of men's singles, ladies' singles, pair skating, and ice dancing.

== Results ==
=== Men ===
Rank	Name	Nation	TFP	CF	SP	FS
1	Paul Wylie	United States		2	1	1
2	Yuri Bureiko	Soviet Union		4		2
3	Scott Williams	United States		3		3
4	Masaru Ogawa	Japan		5		
5	Thomas Wieser	West Germany				
6	Saak Mkhitarian	Soviet Union				
7	Cameron Medhurst	Australia				
8	Oliver Höner	Switzerland		1		
9	Paul Robinson	United Kingdom				
10	Thomas Hlavik	Austria				
11	Fernand Fedronic	France				
12	Xu Xhaoxiao	China				
13	Lars Dresler	Denmark				
14	Philippe Roncoli	France				
15	Roger Andresson	Sweden				
16	Fernando Soria	Spain				

=== Ladies ===
Rank	Name	Nation	TFP	CF	SP	FS
1	Tiffany Chin	United States	7.6	8	2	2
2	Marina Serova	Soviet Union	8.8	4	1	6
3	Anna Antonova	Soviet Union	9.6			
4	Maria Causey	United States		3		7
5	Cornelia Tesch	West Germany		2	4	
6	Diane Mae Ogibowski	Canada		5		
7	Andrea Rohm	Austria		1	15	
8	Midori Ito	Japan		20	7	1
9	Eva Drometer	West Germany		6		
10	Charlene Wong	Canada		13	6	
11	Elise Ahonen	Finland				
12	Sophie Cuissot	France				
13	Mirella Grazia	Switzerland				
14	Li Schwa Wang	Netherlands				
15	Susan Jackson	United Kingdom				
16	Daniela Zuccoli	Italy				
17	Antonella Carrera	Italy				
18	Anette Nygaard	Denmark				
19	Maria Bergqvist	Sweden				
20	Patricia Vangenechten	Belgium				
21	Natacha Viel	Australia				
22	Cristina Haas	Spain				
23	Bao Zhenghua	China				
24	Kathy Lindsay	New Zealand				

=== Pairs ===
Rank	Name	Nation
1	Larisa Selezneva / Oleg Makarov	Soviet Union
2	Lorri Baier / Lloyd Eisler	Canada
3	Marina Nikitiuk / Rashid Kadyrkaev	Soviet Union
4	Inna Bekker / Sergei Likhanski	Soviet Union
5	Julie Wasserman / Robert Davenport	United States
6	Deborah Lynch / Keith Green	United States
7	Carol Nelson / Carl Nelson	United Kingdom
8	Danielle Carr / Stephen Carr	Australia

=== Ice dancing ===
Rank	Name	Nation	TFP	CF	SP	FS
1	Elena Batanova / Alexei Soloviev	Soviet Union		1		
2	Natalia Annenko / Vadim Karkachev	Soviet Union		2		
3	Karyn Garossino / Rodney Garossino	Canada		3		
4	Karan Giles / Russell Green	United Kingdom				
5	Tatiana Gladkova / Igor Shpilband	Soviet Union				
6	Sophie Schmidt / Eric Desplats	France				
7	Sharon Jones / Paul Askham	United Kingdom				
8	Sandra Frabrocini / James Yorke	United States				
9	Sophie Merigot / Philippe Berthe	France				
10	Kathrin Beck / Christoff Beck	Austria				
11	Raffaella Cazzaniga / Massimo Crippa	Italy				
12	Brennice Coates / Leslie Boroczky	Australia				
