= Kira Ivanova =

Soviet figure skater

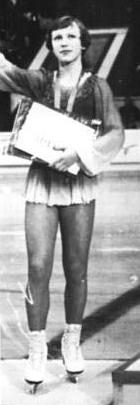
- Kira Ivanova at the 1978 Prize of Moscow News

Personal information
- Native name: Кира Валентиновна Иванова
- Full name: Kira Valentinovna Ivanova
- Born: 10 January 1963 Moscow, Russian SFSR, Soviet Union
- Died: 18 December 2001 (aged 38) Moscow, Russia
- Height: 1.59 m (5 ft 2 1/2 in)

Figure skating career
- Country: Soviet Union
- Coach: Vladimir Kovalev; Viktor Kudriavtsev
- Skating club: Dynamo Moskva
- Retired: 1988
Medal record
Representing the Soviet Union
Figure skating: Ladies' singles
Olympic Games
Bronze medal – third place	1984 Sarajevo	Ladies' singles
World Championships
Silver medal – second place	1985 Tokyo	Ladies' singles
European Championships
Silver medal – second place	1985 Gothenburg	Ladies' singles
Silver medal – second place	1986 Copenhagen	Ladies' singles
Silver medal – second place	1987 Sarajevo	Ladies' singles
Silver medal – second place	1988 Prague	Ladies' singles

Kira Valentinovna Ivanova (Russian: Кира Валентиновна Иванова; 10 January 1963 – 18 December 2001) was a Soviet Russian figure skater. She was the 1984 Olympic bronze medalist, the 1985 World silver medalist, a four-time European silver medalist, and a three-time Soviet national champion.

== Career ==
Ivanova won the silver medal at the 1978 World Junior Championships. She made her senior World debut at the 1979 World Championships, finishing 18th. Ivanova was 16th at the 1980 Winter Olympics.

She was not sent to the 1980 World Championships, however, she received more assignments after Elena Vodorezova, a Soviet champion who had placed 6th at 1978 Worlds, was diagnosed with juvenile arthritis. At the 1981 World Championships, Ivanova placed 13th in the compulsory figures, 4th in the short program, and 13th in the free skate, and finished 12th overall. She won the Moscow News Trophy in the fall of 1982, completing a clean triple-triple jump combination.

The Soviet skating federation allegedly banned Ivanova from competing outside the Soviet Union for two years, beginning in the fall of 1981, for public conflicts with her coach that interfered with her training. She returned to international competition in time for the 1984 Winter Olympics in Sarajevo, where she won bronze. She was the only ladies' single skater to win an Olympic medal for the Soviet Union, the Unified Team or Russia until Irina Slutskaya won silver in 2002.

She won the silver medal at the 1985 European Championships in Gothenburg, at the 1986 European Championships in Copenhagen, at the 1987 European Championships in Sarajevo and at the 1988 European Championships in Prague.

At the 1988 Winter Olympics in Calgary, Ivanova finished first in the compulsory figures ahead of the defending Olympic champion Katarina Witt, but placed 10th and 9th in the short and free programs and finished 7th overall. After ending her amateur career, she skated in Igor Bobrin's Theater of Ice Miniatures. In 1991, Ivanova began coaching children at Moscow's Dynamo arena but quit in August 2001.

== Personal life and death ==
Neighbors found Ivanova's body, covered in stab wounds, in her apartment on 21 December 2001. She had lived in the northern outskirts of Moscow in Otradnoye District.

After her death, the chairman of the Russian Figure Skating Federation, Valentin Piseev, told the press that Ivanova had been suffering from alcoholism, stating "Ivanova became addicted to alcohol in recent years and underwent several treatments, but with no visible results."

== Results ==
International
Event	77–78	78–79	79–80	80–81	81–82	82–83	83–84	84–85	85–86	86–87	87–88
Olympics			16th				3rd				7th
Worlds		18th		12th			4th	2nd	4th	5th	
Europeans		10th	11th	7th			4th	2nd	2nd	2nd	2nd
Moscow News		2nd	1st		2nd	1st	1st	1st		1st	
Skate Canada		?			3rd						
International: Junior
Junior Worlds	2nd										
National
Soviet Champ.	2nd J	1st		1st		DSQ		2nd	2nd	2nd	1st
J = Junior level; DSQ = Disqualified
