= Natalia Strelkova =

Personal information
- Native name: Наталья Николаевна Стрелкова
- Full name: Natalia Nikolayevna Strelkova
- Born: 1961 (age 64–65)

Figure skating career
- Country: Soviet Union

Natalia Nikolayevna Strelkova (Russian: Наталья Николаевна Стрелкова, born in 1961) is a former competitive figure skater for the Soviet Union. She is the 1981 Winter Universiade champion, the 1977 Blue Swords and Prize of Moscow News champion, and a three-time Soviet national silver medalist. Her coaches included Tatiana Lovenko, Alexei Mishin, and Igor Moskvin.

== Competitive highlights ==
International
Event	75–76	77–78	78–79	79–80	80–81	81–82
World Champ.		15th	13th			
European Champ.		9th	17th			
Winter Universiade					1st	
Blue Swords		1st				
Ennia Challenge			3rd			
Prize of Moscow News	5th	1st	4th	2nd		
National
Soviet Champ.	2nd		2nd	2nd	4th	5th
