= Elena Tchaikovskaia =

Soviet and Russian figure skater

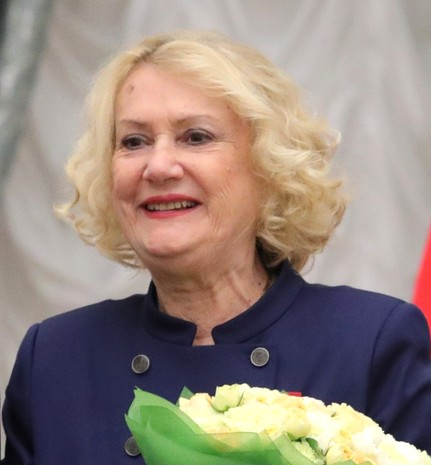
- Tchaikovskaia in 2019

Personal information
- Full name: Elena Anatolyevna Tchaikovskaia
- Other names: Elena Anatolyevna Osipova
- Born: 30 December 1939 (age 86) Moscow, Russian SFSR, Soviet Union (now Russia)

Figure skating career
- Country: Soviet Union
- Coach: Tatiana Tolmacheva
- Retired: 1960

Elena Anatolyevna Tchaikovskaia, also spelled as Chaykovskaya or Chaikovskaia (Russian: Еле́на Анато́льевна Чайко́вская, née Osipova (Russian: О́сипова); born 30 December 1939) is a Russian figure skating coach, choreographer, and former competitor for the Soviet Union. She runs a skating school at the Yantar Sports Center, built in 2010 in the Strogino District west of Moscow. She coaches in collaboration with Vladimir Kotin, her former pupil.

== Biography ==
Elena Tchaikovskaia was born in Moscow in a family of theatre actors. Her father worked in Mossovet Theatre. Since childhood she was prepared to become an actor, and even starred with her father Anatoliy Osipov in several Soviet films, such as Schastlivyy reys. She had unhealthy lungs, so her father took her to the ice rink, believing skating would help improve her health. After school she decided to attend the Russian Academy of Theatre Arts (GITIS), ballet master faculty. In 1957, she became a Soviet champion in single skating. In 1960, she retired from competitions and started working as choreographer and later as a coach. Since 1997, she has served as the Russian Olympic committee's main coach. She also coaches the national figure skating team.

Among her current and former students are:

- Vladimir Kotin
- Vladimir Kovalev
- Natalia Linichuk / Gennadi Karponossov
- Lyudmila Pakhomova / Aleksandr Gorshkov
- Margarita Drobiazko / Povilas Vanagas
- Maria Butyrskaya
- Viktoria Volchkova
- Sergei Davydov
- Andrei Lezin
- Kristina Gorshkova / Vitali Butikov
- Alexandra Maksimova / Egor Maistrov
- Emma Hagieva

The Russian Academy of Theatre Arts has a special faculty for former sportsmen and figure skaters who are willing to become coaches. It is headed by Elena Tchaikovskaia and was formerly headed by Tchaikovskaia's student Lyudmila Pakhomova. Tchaikovskaia also heads a skating school in Moscow called "Skate of Tchaikovskaia" (Russian: Конёк Чайковской).

Tchaikovskaia was twice awarded with the Order of the Red Banner of Labour and once with the Lithuanian Order of Gediminas for her successful work with Margarita Drobiazko and Povilas Vanagas. Drobiazko and Vanagas, as well as Julia Soldatova and Kristina Oblasova trained in "Skate of Tchaikovskaia" school.

== Views ==
In 2023, she stated that the doping case involving Kamila Valieva was the result of "political games" instigated by the West:

The whole story of not allowing us to compete [after the invasion of Ukraine] is just one of the stages. Such a notion, a microdose of something that gives nothing. And after all, they targeted our best girl. If this [positive doping test] was known, then why didn't they announce it at the European Championships right away? The medal would've been taken, that's all [without any consequences affecting the Olympics].

Nothing like that – they waited for the Olympics. Very well done, smart move. To be honest, quite unexpected. No one expected this, and in general this is just hooliganism. And now we have to be very persistent. I especially need Kamila to feel like a person against whom a big political game is being played. She will understand it, she will overcome it, and everything will be fine.

It's hard for her. If she was an adult, she would've been able to assess [the situation], understand, but here it is difficult. Therefore, supporting her is critical. And everyone supports her. In general, for me, this doping story is not only unpleasant – it is simply outrageous. It should not be. They should not target our athletes, especially girls.

== Coaching philosophy ==
Famous for her ice dancing pairs, in 2007, she stated that personally thinks that single skating is far more important and difficult. She is more involved in single skating, though says that she may return to ice dancing someday.

She has written several books about training of figure skaters, including Konek Udachi (Russian: Конёк удачи, lit. "A skate of luck"), which was published in 1994. In 2007, a documentary about her was released in Russia titled Her Ice Majesty. Elena Tchaikovskaia (Russian: Ее ледовое Величество. Елена Чайковская) directed by Oleg Moroseev.

== Results ==
Event	1950	1951	1952	1953
Soviet Championships	3rd		1st	2nd

== Publications ==
- Tchaikovskaia, E. A. (1972). Uzory russkogo tantsa (Patterns of Russian dance) (in Russian). Moscow: Fizkultura i sport. p. 160.
- Tchaikovskaia, E. A. (1980). Shest ballov (Six mark) (in Russian). Moscow: Molodaya Gvardiya. p. 239.
- Tchaikovskaia, E. A. (1986). Figurnoe katanie (Figure skating) (in Russian) (2 ed.). Moscow: Fizkultura i sport. p. 124.
- Tchaikovskaia, E. A. (1994). Konek Udachi (A skate of luck) (in Russian). Moscow: Sov. Sport. p. 218. ISBN 5-85009-428-8.
