= Liudmila Bakonina =

Soviet figure skater

Personal information
- Full name: Liudmila Mikhailovna Bakonina
- Other names: Liudmila Mineyeva (married)
- Born: 25 November 1955 (age 70) Moscow, Russian SFSR

Figure skating career
- Country: Soviet Union
- Retired: 1978

Liudmila Mikhailovna Bakonina, married name: Mineyeva (Russian: Людмила Михайловна Баконина (Минеева), born 25 November 1955) is a former figure skater who represented the Soviet Union.

== Results ==
International
Event	72–73	73–74	74–75	75–76	76–77	77–78
World Champ.		18th	15th			
European Champ.			14th			
Moscow News		2nd	2nd	4th	2nd	
National
Soviet Champ.	3rd	1st	1st	3rd	2nd	1st
