= Diane Ogibowski =

Canadian figure skater

Personal information
- Full name: Diane Mae Ogibowski
- Other names: Hextall
- Born: June 19, 1965 (age 61) Minnedosa, Manitoba, Canada
- Home town: Minnedosa, Manitoba, Canada

Figure skating career
- Country: Canada
- Coach: Trudy Hickling
- Skating club: Minnedosa & Brandon FSC
- Began skating: 1975 (age 10) in Minnedosa
- Retired: c. 1985

Diane Mae Ogibowski (born June 19, 1965) is a Canadian former competitive figure skater. She placed 6th at the 1981 World Junior Championships, held in December 1980 in London, Ontario. The following season, she won two senior international medals – silver at the 1981 Karl Schäfer Memorial and bronze at the 1981 Ennia Challenge Cup. At the Canadian Championships, she won the novice ladies' title in 1980 and became the junior champion the next year. She was a member of the Brandon Figure Skating Club in Brandon, Manitoba, and won the Brandon Sun's 1981 Krug Crawford Award.

Ogibowski grew up on a farm northeast of Basswood, Manitoba. She married Canadian ice hockey player Ron Hextall and gave birth to their first child, Kristin, in 1986. Their other children are named Brett, Rebecca, and Jeffrey.

== Competitive highlights ==
International
Event	79–80	80–81	81–82	82–83	83–84	84–85
Ennia Challenge			3rd			
NHK Trophy				8th		
Prague Skate						4th
Schäfer Memorial			2nd			
Skate Canada				7th		
International: Junior
World Junior Champ.		6th				
National
Canadian Champ.	1st N	1st J	4th			5th
Levels: N = Novice; J = Junior
