= Pyotr Chernyshev =

Personal information
- Born: 1914 Bolshie Verdy, Tambov Governorate, Russian Empire
- Died: 1979 (aged 64–65) Soviet Union

Figure skating career
- Country: Soviet Union

Pyotr Sergeevich Chernyshev (also written as Tchernyshev, Russian: Пётр Серге́евич Чернышев; 1914–1979) was a chief engineer of Leningradsky Metallichesky Zavod, a major pipe-construction specialist. Formerly a Soviet figure skater, four time national figure skating champion. Stalin Prize winner (1952) for the development of steam turbines of high pressure.

His grandson Peter Tchernyshev represented the U.S. in ice dancing.

== Figure skating results ==
Event	1937	1938	1939	1940	1941	1946	1947	1948	1949
Soviet Championships	1st	1st	1st	1st	1st	3rd	3rd	3rd	3rd

== Honours and awards ==
- Hero of Socialist Labour - 1962
- Order of Lenin
- Order of the Red Banner of Labour
- Order of October Revolution
- Stalin Prize
