= Martina Clausner =

German former figure skater

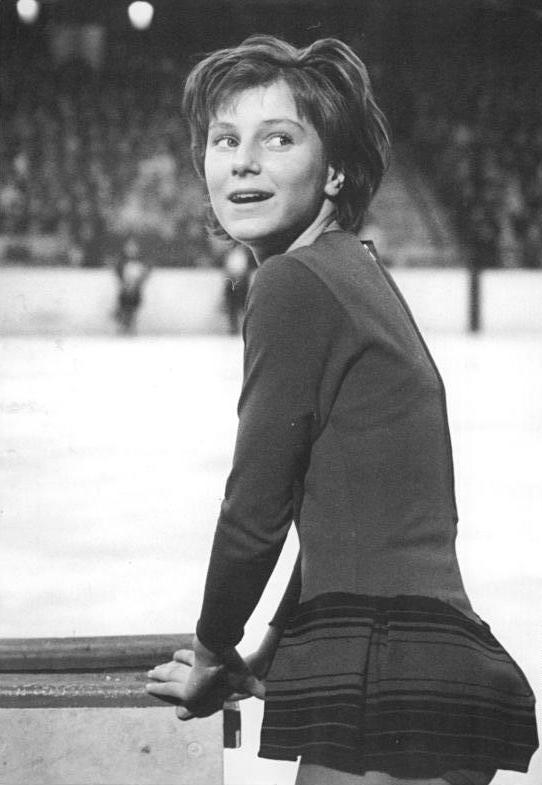
- Clausner in 1966

Figure skating career
- Country: East Germany
- Coach: Jutta Müller
- Skating club: SC Karl-Marx-Stadt
- Retired: c. 1968

Martina Clausner is a German former figure skater who represented East Germany. She is the 1966 Prize of Moscow News champion, a two-time Blue Swords silver medalist, and a three-time East German national medalist, having won one silver and two bronze medals. She competed at three World Championships and three European Championships in the 1960s.

Clausner was coached by Jutta Müller. Her skating club was SC Karl-Marx-Stadt.

== Competitive highlights ==
International
Event	1965–66	1966–67	1967–68
World Championships	20th	14th	17th
European Championships	15th	14th	14th
Blue Swords		2nd	2nd
Prague Skate		4th	
Prize of Moscow News		1st	
Richmond Trophy		?	
National
East German Champ.	3rd	3rd	2nd
