= Vasili Blagov =

Russian pair skater (1954–2019)

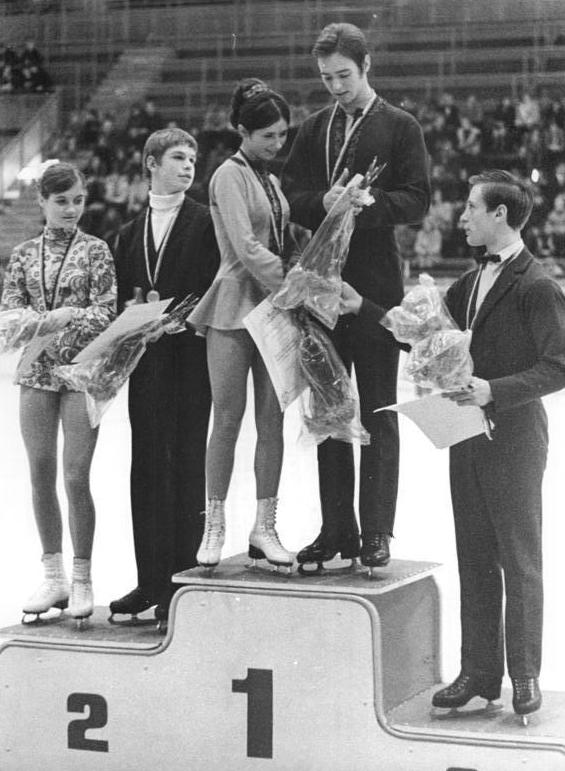
- Blagov (right) in 1970

Personal information
- Full name: Vasili Vyacheslavovich Blagov
- Born: 29 October 1954 Moscow, Soviet Union
- Died: 9 May 2019 (aged 64)

Figure skating career
- Country: Soviet Union

Vasili Vyacheslavovich Blagov (Russian: Василий Вячеславович Благов; 29 October 1954 − 9 May 2019) was a Russian pair skater who competed for the Soviet Union. With partner Irina Cherniaeva, he represented the Soviet Union at the 1972 Winter Olympics where they placed 6th.

He later competed with Natalia Dongauzer (Pavlova), winning the silver medal at the 1973 Prize of Moscow News.

== Competitive highlights ==
(with Cherniaeva)

| Event | 1972 | 1973 |
|---|---|---|
| Winter Olympic Games | 6th | |
| World Championships | 6th | 7th |
| European Championships | 6th | 5th |
| Soviet Championships | 1st | 2nd |

(with Dongauzer)

| Event | 1973 |
|---|---|
| Prize of Moscow News | 2nd |
