= Tatyana Nemtsova =

Soviet figure skater

Personal information
- Native name: Татьяна Владимировна Немцова
- Full name: Tatyana Vladimirovna Nemtsova
- Born: 15 February 1946 (age 80) Moscow, Russian SFSR, Soviet Union

Figure skating career
- Country: Soviet Union
- Coach: Tatyana Tolmachova; Lev Mikhaylov; Petr Orlov
- Skating club: Young Pioneers Stadium; DSO Trud
- Began skating: 1952
- Retired: c. 1964

Tatyana Vladimirovna Nemtsova (Russian: Татьяна Владимировна Немцова; born 15 February 1946) is a former figure skater who competed for the Soviet Union. She became a two-time (1960–61) Soviet national champion and competed at four ISU Championships.

Nemtsova began skating in 1952 at the Young Pioneers Stadium in Moscow and later represented DSO Trud Moscow. Her coaches included Tatyana Tolmachova, Lev Mikhaylov, and Petr Orlov.

== Competitive highlights ==
International
Event	1959	1960	1961	1962	1963	1964
World Champ.				20th	23rd	
European Champ.	24th	24th				
National
Soviet Champ.		1st	1st		3rd	2nd
