= Irina Grishkova =

Soviet ice dancer

Personal information
- Native name: Ирина Павловна Гришкова
- Full name: Irina Pavlovna Grishkova
- Born: 18 September 1946 (age 79) Moscow, Soviet Union

Figure skating career
- Country: Soviet Union
- Partner: Viktor Ryzhkin, Alexander Treshchev
- Coach: Stanislava Lyassotovich, Tatiana Tolmacheva
- Retired: c. 1968

Irina Pavlovna Grishkova (Russian: Ирина Павловна Гришкова; born 18 September 1946) is a former ice dancer who represented the Soviet Union. With Viktor Ryzhkin, she is the 1967 Prague Skate champion, a two-time Prize of Moscow News champion, and a two-time Soviet national champion. The duo finished in the top ten at four ISU Championships. Earlier in her career, she competed in partnership with Alexander Treshchev.

== Competitive highlights ==
=== With Ryzhkin ===
International
| Event | 1966–67 | 1967–68 |
|---|---|---|
| World Championships | 7th | 5th |
| European Championships | 8th | 4th |
| Prague Skate | 3rd | 1st |
| Prize of Moscow News | 1st | 1st |
National
| Soviet Championships | 1st | 1st |

=== With Treshchev ===
National
| Event | 1964–65 | 1965–66 |
|---|---|---|
| Soviet Championships | 2nd | 2nd |
