= Larissa Zamotina =

Russian former competitive figure skater (born 1967)

Personal information
- Native name: Лариса Владимировна Замотина
- Full name: Larissa Vladimirovna Zamotina
- Born: 25 June 1967 (age 59) Leningrad, Russian SFSR, Soviet Union

Figure skating career
- Country: Soviet Union
- Retired: c. 1991

Larissa Vladimirovna Zamotina (Russian: Лариса Владимировна Замотина; born 25 June 1967) is a Russian former competitive figure skater who competed for the Soviet Union. She is the 1987 Winter Universiade champion, 1990 NHK Trophy bronze medalist, and two-time Soviet national bronze medalist.

Zamotina was coached by Igor Ksenofontov. After her retirement from competition, she performed with Disney on Ice, appearing in Hercules. In 2008, she was named a technical specialist for singles on the regional level at U.S. Figure Skating. She is now married and coaches at the Robert Crown Ice Arena in Evanston, Illinois. Her daughter, Alina Bonillo, has competed at the 2025 U.S. Figure Skating Championships and 2026 U.S Figure Skating Championships, finishing 15th and 12th respectively.

== Competitive highlights ==
International
Event	85–86	86–87	87–88	88–89	89–90	90–91
European Champ.					10th	11th
Inter. de Paris					4th	
NHK Trophy						3rd
Prize of Moscow News	10th	6th	4th			
Winter Universiade		1st		2nd		
National
Soviet Champ.	7th	10th	4th		3rd	3rd
