= Tatyana Tolmachova =

Soviet figure skater

Personal information
- Full name: Tatyana Aleksandrovna Tolmachova
- Born: 27 January 1907 Moscow, Russian Empire
- Died: 21 October 1998 (aged 91) Moscow, Russian Federation

Figure skating career
- Country: Soviet Union
- Coach: Aleksey Andrianov

Tatyana Aleksandrovna Tolmachova (Russian: Татьяна Александровна Толмачёва, née Granatkina, Гранаткина; 21 January 1907 – 21 October 1998) was a Russian figure skater, figure skating coach and one of the founders of Soviet figure skating school, Honoured Master of Sports of the USSR. She started skating as single skater and represented the club of Dynamo in the 1930s. Then she moved to pair skating with her husband Alexander Tolmachev.

Tolmachova was the leading ladies' coach. She worked in Moscow. Her husband Alexander Tolmachev headed the Moscow department of the Figure Skating Federation of Russia.

Since 1946, Tolmachova worked as a figure skating coach at the Young Pioneers Stadium school in Moscow, established with her help. Among her pupils were Vladimir Kovalev, Elena Tchaikovskaia, Lyudmila Pakhomova, Galina Kuhar, Alexander Vedenin, Tatiana Nemtsova, Elena Sheglova, Sergei Chetverukhin, Valentin Piseev.

Her brother Valentin Granatkin was a football, ice hockey and bandy player.

== Results ==
=== Singles ===
Event	1933	1934	1935	1936	1937
Soviet Championships	1st			1st	1st

=== Pairs ===
(with Tolmachev)

Event	1933	1937	1938	1941	1945	1946	1947	1948	1949	1950	1951
Soviet Championships	2nd	1st*	1st	1st	1st	1st	1st	1st	1st	1st	1st
* Co-champions with Raisa Gandelsman and Alexander Gandelsman.
