= Tatiana Rachkova =

Russian figure skater

Personal information
- Full name: Tatiana Borisovna Rachkova
- Born: 14 January 1973 (age 53) Moscow, Russian SFSR, Soviet Union

Figure skating career
- Country: Russia; Unified Team; Soviet Union
- Retired: 1994

Tatiana Borisovna Rachkova (Russian: Татьяна Борисовна Рачкова; born 14 January 1973) is a Russian former competitive figure skater who also represented the Unified Team and the Soviet Union. She is the 1992 Vienna Cup champion, 1992 Russian national bronze medalist, and placed 16th at the 1992 Winter Olympics.

She is now a skating instructor at the Chiller Ice Rinks in Columbus, Ohio, United States.

== Results ==
International
Event	1990–91	1991–92	1992–93	1993–94
Winter Olympics		16th		
World Championships		13th		
European Championships		14th		
Goodwill Games	6th			
Skate Canada	7th			
NHK Trophy		11th		
International de Paris				11th
Vienna Cup			1st	
National
Russian Championships			3rd	4th
Soviet Championships	5th	2nd		
