= Marina Avstriyskaya =

Russian pair skater

Personal information
- Full name: Marina Aleksandrovna Avstriyskaya
- Born: 21 June 1967 (age 59) Moscow, Russian SFSR, Soviet Union
- Height: 1.65 m (5 ft 5 in)

Figure skating career
- Country: Soviet Union
- Skating club: CSKA Moscow
- Retired: 1984

Marina Aleksandrovna Avstriyskaya (Russian: Марина Александровна Австрийская; born 21 June 1967) is a Russian former pair skater who competed for the Soviet Union. With Yuri Kvashnin, she won gold at the 1982 and 1983 World Junior Championships and competed at the 1984 Winter Olympics, placing ninth.

She is the mother of Russian figure skater Alexandra Avstriyskaya, born on 30 October 2000.

== Results ==
Pairs with Kvashnin:

International
Event	1981–82	1982–83	1983–84
Winter Olympics			9th
European Champ.		5th	5th
NHK Trophy		3rd	
International: Junior
World Junior Champ.	1st	1st	
National
Soviet Champ.		3rd	2nd
Spartakiada	1st J		
J = Junior level
