= Tatyana Zhuk =

Soviet figure skater

Olympic medal record

Figure skating

Representing Soviet Union
Silver medal – second place	1968 Grenoble	Pairs

Tatyana Zhuk
Personal information
- Full name: Tatyana Alekseyevna Zhuk
- Born: 1 January 1946 Leningrad, Russian SFSR, Soviet Union
- Died: 21 March 2011 Orekhovo-Zuyevo, Russia

Figure skating career
- Country: Soviet Union
- Retired: 1969
Medal record
Representing Soviet Union
Pairs' Figure skating
Olympic Games
Silver medal – second place	1968 Grenoble	Pairs
World Championships
Silver medal – second place	1968 Geneva	Pairs
Silver medal – second place	1966 Davos	Pairs
Bronze medal – third place	1965 Colorado Springs	Pairs
Bronze medal – third place	1963 Cortina d'Ampezzo	Pairs
European Championships
Silver medal – second place	1966 Bratislava	Pairs
Bronze medal – third place	1965 Moscow	Pairs
Bronze medal – third place	1964 Grenoble	Pairs
Bronze medal – third place	1963 Budapest	Pairs

Tatyana Alekseyevna Zhuk (Russian: Татьяна Алексеевна Жук, January 1, 1946 - March 21, 2011) was a Soviet/Russian pair skater. With partner Aleksandr Gorelik, she was the 1968 Winter Olympics silver medalist. They were also the 1965 World bronze medalists and the 1966 and 1968 World silver medalists, as well as the 1965 European bronze and 1966 silver medalists.

Zhuk previously competed with Aleksandr Gavrilov, with whom she medaled at the 1963 and 1964 European Championships and the 1963 World Championships. They placed 5th at the 1964 Winter Olympics.

In 1969, Zhuk became pregnant. She and her husband Albert Shesternyov decided to keep the baby and retire from competitive skating.

== Results ==
=== Ladies' singles ===
National
Event	1963
Soviet Championships	2nd

=== Pairs with Gavrilov ===
International
Event	1960	1961	1962	1963	1964
Winter Olympics					5th
World Championships				3rd	6th
European Championships	10th			3rd	3rd
National
Soviet Championships	1st	3rd	2nd	2nd	

=== Pairs with Gorelik ===
International
Event	1965	1966	1967	1968
Winter Olympics				2nd
World Championships	3rd	2nd		2nd
European Championships	3rd	2nd		
National
Soviet Championships		2nd		
