= Soviet Figure Skating Championships =

Defunct figure skating competition

- Status: Defunct
- Genre: National championships
- Frequency: Annual
- Country: Soviet Union
- Years active: 1924–1992
- Organizer: Figure Skating Federation of the USSR

The Soviet Figure Skating Championships (Russian: Чемпионат СССР по фигурному катанию) – also known as the USSR Figure Skating Championships – were an annual figure skating competition organized by the Figure Skating Federation of the USSR (Russian: Федерации фигурного катания СССР) to crown the national champions of the Soviet Union. The first Soviet Championships were held in 1924 in Moscow. Competitions were frequently interrupted early on, particularly leading up to and during World War II, while the final Soviet Championships were held in 1991 in Kyiv. After the collapse of the Soviet Union, many of the former Soviet republics held their own national figure skating championships.

Medals were awarded in men's singles, women's singles, pair skating, and ice dance. Sergei Chetverukhin and Alexandre Fadeev are tied for winning the most Soviet Championship titles in men's singles (with six each), Julia Katkhanova holds the record in women's singles (also with six), and Tatyana Tolmachova (née Granatkina) and Alexander Tolmachev hold the record in pair skating (with ten). Lyudmila Pakhomova and Aleksandr Gorshkov hold the record in ice dance (with six), although Pakhomova won an additional three titles with a previous partner.

== History ==
The Union of Soviet Socialist Republics – more commonly referred to as the USSR or the Soviet Union – was established in 1922 following World War I and the Russian Revolution. The first Soviet Figure Skating Championships were held in 1924 in Moscow, and continued to 1941 with frequent interruptions leading up to World War II. Competitions were held without interruption from 1945 onwards. Ice dance made its debut at the 1946 Soviet Championships. The figure skating competitions at the 1958 Spartakiad of the RSFSR (Russian Soviet Federative Socialist Republic) served as the 1958 Soviet Championships; the same was true for the 1974 and 1978 Spartakiads of the Peoples of the USSR. The last installment was held in December 1991 in Kyiv, in what was then the Ukrainian Soviet Socialist Republic.

After the collapse of the Soviet Union in December 1991, Russia and the other eleven Soviet republics emerged as independent nations. Numerous Soviet medalists went on to have successful careers competing in the Russian Figure Skating Championships: Alexei Urmanov won four Russian men's titles from 1993 to 1996, Maria Butyrskaya won six women's titles between 1993 and 1999, Marina Eltsova and Andrei Bushkov won four pairs titles between 1993 and 1998, Evgenia Shishkova and Vadim Naumov won the pairs title in 1996, Oksana Grishuk and Evgeni Platov won the ice dance title in 1996, and Anjelika Krylova and Vladimir Fedorov won the ice dance titles in 1993 to 1994. Viktor Petrenko won the men's title at the 1994 Ukrainian Figure Skating Championships, while Julia Vorobieva became a seven-time national champion of Azerbaijan.

== Senior medalists ==
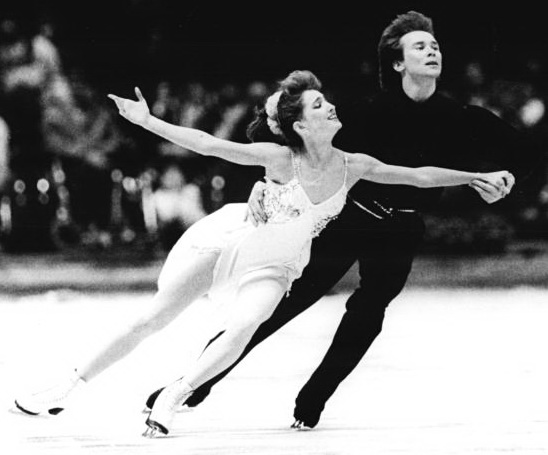
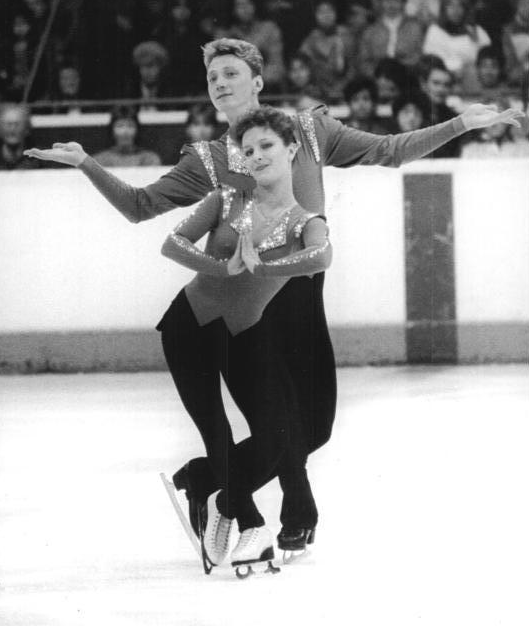
(From left to right): Marina Klimova and Sergei Ponomarenko, four-time Soviet champions in ice dance, and Elena Valova and Oleg Vasiliev, the 1986 champions in pair skating

=== Men's singles ===
Men's event medalists
Year	Location	Gold	Silver	Bronze	Ref.
1924	Moscow	Yuri Zeldovich	No other competitors		
1925–26	No competitions held				
1927	Leningrad	Yuri Zeldovich	Mikhail Stankevich	No other competitors	
1928	Leningrad	Yuri Zeldovich	Leonid Shaposhnikov	Mikhail Stankevich	
1929–32	No competitions held				
1933	Gorky	Ivan Bogoyavlensky	Mr. V. Dmitriev	Mr. Strelkov	
1934–36	No competitions held				
1937	Moscow	Pyotr Chernyshev	Petr Orlov	Sergei Vasilyev	
1938	Leningrad	Pyotr Chernyshev	Petr Orlov	Sergei Vasilyev	
1939	Gorky	Pyotr Chernyshev	Sergei Vasiliev	Petr Orlov	
1940	No competition held				
1941	Moscow	Pyotr Chernyshev	Sergei Vasiliev	Petr Orlov	
1942–44	No competitions held				
1945	Gorky	Sergei Vasiliev	Pyotr Chernyshev	Boris Podkosi	
1946	Tallinn	Petr Orlov	Sergei Vasiliev	Pyotr Chernyshev	
1947	Gorky	Petr Orlov	Sergei Vasiliev	Pyotr Chernyshev	
1948	Moscow	Sergei Vasiliev	Petr Orlov	Pyotr Chernyshev	
1949	Gorky	Sergei Vasiliev	Pyotr Chernyshev	Petr Orlov	
1950	Kalinin	Sergei Vasiliev	Petr Orlov	B. Podkopaev	
1951	Tula	Petr Orlov	Sergei Vasiliev	Ivan Mitrushchenkov	
1952	Moscow	Ivan Mitrushchenkov	Sergei Vasiliev	Valentin Zakharov	
1953	Yaroslavl	Valentin Zakharov	Petr Orlov	Ivan Mitrushchenkov	
1954	Kirov	Valentin Zakharov	Oleg Simantovsky	Igor Persiantsev	
1955	Moscow	Igor Persiantsev	Oleg Simantovsky	Valentin Zakharov	
1956	Arkhangelsk	Lev Mikhaylov	Oleg Simantovsky	Igor Persiantsev	
1957	Moscow	Lev Mikhaylov	Valentin Zakharov	Oleg Simantovsky	
1958	Moscow	Lev Mikhaylov	Valentin Zakharov	Igor Persiantsev	
1959	Moscow	Lev Mikhaylov	Igor Persiantsev	Oleg Simantovsky	
1960	Moscow	Lev Mikhaylov	Oleg Simantovsky	Igor Persiantsev	
1961	Moscow	Valery Meshkov	Oleg Simantovsky	Alexander Vedenin	
1962	Riga	Valery Meshkov	Alexander Vedenin	Oleg Simantovsky	
1963	Moscow	Alexander Vedenin	Vladimir Kurenbin	Valery Meshkov	
1964	Kirov	Valery Meshkov	Sergei Chetverukhin	Alexei Mishin	
1965	Kyiv	Alexander Vedenin	Valery Meshkov	Sergei Chetverukhin	
1966	Gorky	Valery Meshkov	Sergei Chetverukhin	Vladimir Kurenbin	
1967	Kuybyshev	Sergei Chetverukhin	Vladimir Kurenbin	Valery Meshkov	
1968	Voskresensk	Sergei Chetverukhin	Valery Meshkov	Vladimir Kurenbin	
1969	Leningrad	Sergei Chetverukhin	Vladimir Kurenbin	Sergey Volkov	
1970	Kyiv	Sergei Chetverukhin	Sergey Volkov	Yuri Ovchinnikov	
1971	Riga	Sergei Chetverukhin	Sergey Volkov	Yuri Ovchinnikov	
1972	Minsk	Vladimir Kovalyov	Sergey Volkov	Igor Bobrin	
1973	Rostov-on-Don	Sergei Chetverukhin	Yuri Ovchinnikov	Sergey Volkov	
1974	Sverdlovsk	Sergey Volkov	Yuri Ovchinnikov	Vladimir Kovalyov	
1975	Kyiv	Yuri Ovchinnikov	Sergey Volkov	Vladimir Kovalyov	
1976	Volgograd	Sergey Volkov	Yuri Ovchinnikov	Igor Bobrin	
1977	Vilnius	Vladimir Kovalyov	Yuri Ovchinnikov	Sergey Volkov	
1978	Sverdlovsk	Igor Bobrin	Vladimir Kovalyov	Konstantin Kokora	
1979	Zaporizhzhia	Konstantin Kokora	Igor Bobrin	Vladimir Kotin	
1980	Kharkiv	Igor Bobrin	Vladimir Kotin	Konstantin Kokora	
1981	Odesa	Igor Bobrin	Alexandre Fadeev	Vladimir Kotin	
1982	Riga	Igor Bobrin	Vladimir Kotin	Alexandre Fadeev	
1983	Chelyabinsk	Alexandre Fadeev	Igor Bobrin	Vitali Egorov	
1984	Tashkent	Vitali Egorov	Leonid Kaznakov	Viktor Petrenko	
1985	Dnipropetrovsk	Vladimir Kotin	Vitali Egorov	Leonid Kaznakov	
1986	Leningrad	Alexandre Fadeev	Viktor Petrenko	Vitali Egorov	
1987	Vilnius	Alexandre Fadeev	Viktor Petrenko	Vitali Egorov	
1988	Yerevan	Alexandre Fadeev	Viktor Petrenko	Vladimir Kotin	
1989	Kyiv	Alexandre Fadeev	Dmitri Gromov	Yuriy Tsymbalyuk	
1990	Leningrad	Alexandre Fadeev	Viktor Petrenko	Dmitri Gromov	
1991	Minsk	Viktor Petrenko	Vyacheslav Zahorodnyuk	Alexei Urmanov	
1992	Kyiv	Alexei Urmanov	Vyacheslav Zahorodnyuk	Viktor Petrenko	

=== Women's singles ===
Women's event medalists
Year	Location	Gold	Silver	Bronze	Ref.
1924	Moscow	No women's competitors			
1925–26	No competitions held				
1928	Leningrad	M. Petrova	M. Matselis	No other competitors	
1929–32	No competitions held				
1933	Gorky	Tatiana Granatkina	Tatyana Molchanova	No other competitors	
1934–36	No competitions held				
1937	Moscow	Tatiana Granatkina	Evgenia Alekseeva (née Oborina)	No other competitors	
1938	Leningrad	Evgenia Alekseeva (née Oborina)	Nina Leplinskaya	No other competitors	
1939	Gorky	Evgenia Alekseeva (née Oborina)	Nina Leplinskaya	Julia Katkhanova (née Nikolaeva)	
1940	No competition held				
1941	Moscow	Evgenia Alekseeva (née Oborina)	Vaike Paduri (née Kaljuvee)	Julia Katkhanova (née Nikolaeva)	
1942–44	No competitions held				
1945	Gorky	Vaike Paduri (née Kaljuvee)	Jelena Vasiljeva	Lidia Sokolova	
1946	Tallinn	Evgenia Alekseeva (née Oborina)	Vaike Paduri (née Kaljuvee)	Julia Katkhanova (née Nikolaeva)	
1947	Gorky	Julia Katkhanova (née Nikolaeva)	Vaike Paduri (née Kaljuvee)	Tatiana Granatkina	
1948	Moscow	Julia Katkhanova (née Nikolaeva)	Vaike Paduri (née Kaljuvee)	Julia Alexeeva	
1949	Gorky	Julia Katkhanova (née Nikolaeva)	Evgenia Alekseeva (née Oborina)	Nonna Kartavenko	
1950	Kalinin	Julia Katkhanova (née Nikolaeva)	Nonna Kartavenko	Maya Belenkaya	
1951	Tula	Julia Katkhanova (née Nikolaeva)	Nonna Kartavenko	Maya Belenkaya	
1952	Moscow	Julia Katkhanova (née Nikolaeva)	Nonna Kartavenko	Maya Belenkaya	
1953	Yaroslavl	Nonna Kartavenko	Maya Belenkaya	Marina Granatkina	
1954	Kirov	Maya Belenkaya	Evgenia Bogdanova	Marina Granatkina	
1955	Moscow	Tatiana Likhareva	Evgenia Bogdanova	Elena Osipova	
1956	Arkhangelsk	Evgenia Bogdanova	Tatiana Likhareva	Tatiana Medvedeva	
1957	Moscow	Elena Osipova	Evgenia Bogdanov	Tatiana Likhareva	
1958	Moscow	Tatiana Likhareva	Evgenia Bogdanov	Elena Osipova	
1959	Moscow	Tatiana Likhareva	Evgenia Bogdanov	Irina Ershova	
1960	Moscow	Tatyana Nemtsova	Tamara Bratus	Tatiana Likhareva	
1961	Moscow	Tatyana Nemtsova	Tamara Bratus	Irina Grishkova	
1962	Riga	Tamara Bratus (Moskvina)	Irina Liuliakova	Svetlana Tarasova	
1963	Moscow	Tamara Bratus (Moskvina)	Tatyana Zhuk	Tatyana Nemtsova	
1964	Kirov	Tamara Bratus (Moskvina)	Tatyana Nemtsova	Tatyana Loginova	
1965	Kyiv	Tamara Bratus (Moskvina)	Elena Slepova	Elena Shcheglova	
1966	Gorky	Tamara Bratus (Moskvina)	Galina Grzhibovskaya	Tatiana Moskovskaya	
1967	Kuybyshev	Elena Shcheglova	Galina Grzhibovskaya	Elena Alexandrova	
1968	Voskresensk	Galina Grzhibovskaya	Elena Shcheglova	Elena Alexandrova	
1969	Leningrad	Elena Shcheglova	Galina Grzhibovskaya	Elena Alexandrova	
1970	Kyiv	Elena Alexandrova	Elena Shcheglova	Alla Korneva	
1971	Riga	Marina Titova	Elena Alexandrova	Elena Kotova	
1972	Minsk	Marina Titova	Tatiana Oleneva	Elena Kotova	
1973	Rostov-on-Don	Tatiana Oleneva	Marina Sanaya	Liudmila Bakonina	
1974	Sverdlovsk	Liudmila Bakonina	Tatiana Rachkova	Elena Lytkina	
1975	Kyiv	Liudmila Bakonina	Tatiana Rachkova	Elena Lytkina	
1976	Volgograd	Elena Vodorezova	Natalia Strelkova	Liudmila Bakonina	
1977	Vilnius	Elena Vodorezova	Liudmila Bakonina	Marina Kulbitskaya	
1978	Sverdlovsk	Liudmila Bakonina	Marina Ignatova	Zhanna Ilyina	
1979	Zaporizhzhia	Kira Ivanova	Natalia Strelkova	Marina Ignatova	
1980	Kharkiv	Elena Vodorezova	Natalia Strelkova	Alla Fomicheva	
1981	Odesa	Kira Ivanova	Alla Fomicheva	Marina Serova	
1982	Riga	Elena Vodorezova	Anna Antonova	Anna Kondrashova	
1983	Chelyabinsk	Elena Vodorezova	Anna Kondrashova	Anna Antonova	
1984	Tashkent	Natalia Lebedeva	Marina Serova	Anna Antonova	
1985	Dnipropetrovsk	Anna Kondrashova	Kira Ivanova	Natalia Lebedeva	
1986	Leningrad	Anna Kondrashova	Kira Ivanova	Natalia Lebedeva	
1987	Vilnius	Anna Kondrashova	Kira Ivanova	Natalia Skrabnevskaya	
1988	Yerevan	Anna Kondrashova	Kira Ivanova	Natalia Gorbenko	
1989	Kyiv	Natalia Gorbenko	Natalia Lebedeva	Anna Lozovik	
1990	Leningrad	Natalia Lebedeva	Natalia Skrabnevskaya	Larissa Zamotina	
1991	Minsk	Julia Vorobieva	Natalia Gorbenko	Larissa Zamotina	
1992	Kyiv	Julia Vorobieva	Tatiana Rachkova	Maria Butyrskaya	

=== Pairs ===
Pairs' event medalists
Year	Location	Gold	Silver	Bronze	Ref.
1924	Moscow	Alexandrа Bykovskaya; Yuri Zeldovich	No other competitors		
1925–26	No competitions held				
1927	Leningrad	Ms. Kuznetsova; Mikhail Stankevich	Ms. Frolova; Mr. Alexeev	Ms. Kaarna; Mr. Stepanov	
1928	Leningrad	Maria Laskevich; Igor Vonzblein	Ms. Kuznetsova; Mikhail Stankevich	Ms. Frolova; Mr. Alexeev	
1929–32	No competitions held				
1933	Gorky	Valentina Krylova; Ivan Krylov	Tatyana Granatkina; Alexander Tolmachev	Raisa Novozhilova (née Gandelsman); Alexander Gandelsman	
1934–36	No competitions held				
1937	Moscow	Raisa Novozhilova (née Gandelsman); Alexander Gandelsman; &: Tatyana Granatkina; Alexander Tolmachev; (tied)	No silver medals awarded	Olga Dedova; Аlexander Klimov	
1938	Leningrad	Tatyana Granatkina; Alexander Tolmachev	Valentina Krylova; Ivan Krylov	Ms. I. Krylova; Petr Orlov	
1939	Gorky	Raisa Novozhilova (née Gandelsman); Alexander Gandelsman	Tatyana Granatkina; Alexander Tolmachev	Ms. I. Krylova; Petr Orlov	
1940	No competition held				
1941	Moscow	Tatyana Granatkina; Alexander Tolmachev	Raisa Novozhilova (née Gandelsman); Alexander Gandelsman	Ms. I. Krylova; Petr Orlov	
1942–44	No competitions held				
1945	Gorky	Tatyana Granatkina; Alexander Tolmachev	Raisa Novozhilova (née Gandelsman); Alexander Gandelsman	Ms. B. Dedova; Mr. A. Klimov	
1946	Tallinn	Tatyana Granatkina; Alexander Tolmachev	Raisa Novozhilova (née Gandelsman); Alexander Gandelsman	Larisa Novozhilova; Samson Glazer	
1947	Gorky	Tatyana Granatkina; Alexander Tolmachev	Raisa Novozhilova (née Gandelsman); Alexander Gandelsman	Larisa Novozhilova; Samson Glazer	
1948	Moscow	Tatyana Granatkina; Alexander Tolmachev	Raisa Novozhilova (née Gandelsman); Alexander Gandelsman	Larisa Novozhilova; Samson Glazer	
1949	Gorky	Tatyana Granatkina; Alexander Tolmachev	Raisa Novozhilova (née Gandelsman); Alexander Gandelsman	Larisa Novozhilova; Samson Glazer	
1950	Kalinin	Tatyana Granatkina; Alexander Tolmachev	Maya Belenkaya; Igor Moskvin	Raisa Novozhilova (née Gandelsman); Alexander Gandelsman	
1951	Tula	Tatyana Granatkina; Alexander Tolmachev	Maya Belenkaya; Igor Moskvin	Larisa Novozhilova; Samson Glazer	
1952	Moscow	Marina Granatkina; Valentin Zakharov	Lydia Gerasimova; Yuri Kiselev	Maya Belenkaya; Igor Moskvin	
1953	Yaroslavl	Maya Belenkaya; Igor Moskvin	Margarita Bogoyavlenskaya; Oleg Protopopov	Lydia Gerasimova; Yuri Kiselev	
1954	Kirov	Maya Belenkaya; Igor Moskvin	Lydia Gerasimova; Yuri Kiselev	Nina Bakusheva; Stanislav Zhuk	
1955	Moscow	Lydia Gerasimova; Yuri Kiselev	Maya Belenkaya; Igor Moskvin	Nina Bakusheva; Stanislav Zhuk; &: Ludmila Belousova; Oleg Protopopov; (tied)	
1956	Arkhangelsk	Lydia Gerasimova; Yuri Kiselev	Maya Belenkaya; Igor Moskvin	Ludmila Belousova; Oleg Protopopov	
1957	Moscow	Nina Zhuk; Stanislav Zhuk	Ludmila Belousova; Oleg Protopopov	Maya Belenkaya; Igor Moskvin	
1958	Moscow	Nina Zhuk; Stanislav Zhuk	Ludmila Belousova; Oleg Protopopov	Maya Belenkaya; Igor Moskvin	
1959	Moscow	Nina Zhuk; Stanislav Zhuk	Ludmila Belousova; Oleg Protopopov	Svetlana Mozer; Yuri Nevsky	
1960	Moscow	Tatyana Zhuk; Alexander Gavrilov	Galina Sedova; Georgi Proskurin	Ms. L. Drozdenko; Yuri Orlov	
1961	Moscow	Nina Zhuk; Stanislav Zhuk	Ludmila Belousova; Oleg Protopopov	Tatyana Zhuk; Alexander Gavrilov	
1962	Riga	Ludmila Belousova; Oleg Protopopov	Galina Sedova; Georgi Proskurin	A. Ivanova; Fyodor Safargaliev	
1963	Moscow	Ludmila Belousova; Oleg Protopopov	Tatyana Zhuk; Alexander Gavrilov	Galina Orlova; Georgi Proskurin	
1964	Kirov	Ludmila Belousova; Oleg Protopopov	Tatiana Sharanova; Aleksandr Gorelik	Tatiana Tarasova; Georgi Proskurin	
1965	Kyiv	Tamara Moskvina; Alexander Gavrilov	Tatiana Tarasova; Georgi Proskurin	Lyudmila Suslina; Alexander Tikhomirov	
1966	Gorky	Ludmila Belousova; Oleg Protopopov	Tatyana Zhuk; Aleksandr Gorelik	Tamara Moskvina; Alexei Mishin	
1967	Kuybyshev	Ludmila Belousova; Oleg Protopopov	Tamara Moskvina; Alexei Mishin	Tatiana Sharanova; Anatoli Evdokimov	
1968	Voskresensk	Ludmila Belousova; Oleg Protopopov	Tamara Moskvina; Alexei Mishin	Irina Rodnina; Alexei Ulanov	
1969	Leningrad	Tamara Moskvina; Alexei Mishin	Ludmila Belousova; Oleg Protopopov	Irina Rodnina; Alexei Ulanov	
1970	Kyiv	Irina Rodnina; Alexei Ulanov	Lyudmila Smirnova; Andrei Suraikin	Galina Karelina; Georgi Proskurin	
1971	Riga	Irina Rodnina; Alexei Ulanov	Lyudmila Smirnova; Andrei Suraikin	Galina Karelina; Georgi Proskurin	
1972	Minsk	Irina Chernyaeva; Vasili Blagov	Irina Vorobieva; Aleksandr Vlasov	Ludmila Belousova; Oleg Protopopov	
1973	Rostov-on-Don	Irina Rodnina; Alexander Zaitsev	Irina Cherniaeva; Vasili Blagov	Lyudmila Smirnova; Alexei Ulanov	
1974	Sverdlovsk	Irina Rodnina; Alexander Zaitsev	Nadezhda Gorshkova; Evgeni Shevalovski	Irina Vorobieva; Aleksandr Vlasov	
1975	Kyiv	Irina Rodnina; Alexander Zaitsev	Nadezhda Gorshkova; Evgeni Shevalovski	Marina Leonidova; Vladimir Bogolyubov	
1976	Volgograd	Irina Vorobieva; Aleksandr Vlasov	Nadezhda Gorshkova; Evgeni Shevalovski	Marina Leonidova; Vladimir Bogolyubov	
1977	Vilnius	Irina Rodnina; Alexander Zaitsev	Irina Vorobieva; Aleksandr Vlasov	Marina Cherkasova; Sergei Shakhrai	
1978	Sverdlovsk	Marina Cherkasova; Sergei Shakhrai	Marina Pestova; Stanislav Leonovich	Julia Rennik; Ardo Rennik	
1979	Zaporizhzhia	Marina Cherkasova; Sergei Shakhrai	Marina Pestova; Stanislav Leonovich	Irina Vorobieva; Igor Lisovsky	
1980	Kharkiv	Marina Pestova; Stanislav Leonovich	Irina Vorobieva; Igor Lisovsky	Inna Volyanskaya; Valery Spiridonov	
1981	Odesa	Veronica Pershina; Marat Akbarov	Irina Vorobieva; Igor Lisovsky	Marina Cherkasova; Sergei Shakhrai	
1982	Riga	Marina Pestova; Stanislav Leonovich	Veronica Pershina; Marat Akbarov	Elena Valova; Oleg Vasiliev	
1983	Chelyabinsk	Marina Pestova; Stanislav Leonovich	Veronica Pershina; Marat Akbarov	Marina Avstriyskaya; Yuri Kvashnin	
1984	Tashkent	Larisa Selezneva; Oleg Makarov	Marina Avstriyskaya; Yuri Kvashnin	Elena Bechke; Valery Kornienko	
1985	Dnipropetrovsk	Larisa Selezneva; Oleg Makarov	Elena Valova; Oleg Vasiliev	Veronica Pershina; Marat Akbarov	
1986	Leningrad	Elena Valova; Oleg Vasiliev	Ekaterina Gordeeva; Sergei Grinkov	Veronica Pershina; Marat Akbarov	
1987	Vilnius	Ekaterina Gordeeva; Sergei Grinkov	Larisa Selezneva; Oleg Makarov	Elena Kvitchenko; Rashid Kadyrkaev	
1988	Yerevan	Larisa Selezneva; Oleg Makarov	Elena Leonova; Gennadi Krasnitski	Elena Kvitchenko; Rashid Kadyrkaev	
1989	Kyiv	Larisa Selezneva; Oleg Makarov	Natalia Mishkutionok; Artur Dmitriev	Elena Kvitchenko; Rashid Kadyrkaev	
1990	Leningrad	Larisa Selezneva; Oleg Makarov	Natalia Mishkutionok; Artur Dmitriev	Elena Leonova; Gennadi Krasnitski	
1991	Minsk	Evgenia Shishkova; Vadim Naumov	Natalia Mishkutionok; Artur Dmitriev	Elena Bechke; Denis Petrov	
1992	Kyiv	Elena Bechke; Denis Petrov	Evgenia Shishkova; Vadim Naumov	Marina Eltsova; Andrei Bushkov	

=== Ice dance ===
Ice dance event medalists
Year	Location	Gold	Silver	Bronze	Ref.
1946	Tallinn	Antonina Nekrasova; Alexander Yakovlev	No other competitors		
1947	Gorky	Antonina Nekrasova; Alexander Yakovlev	Vaike Paduri (née Kaljuvee); Vladimir Rodin	Raisa Novozhilova (née Gandelsman); Alexander Gandelsman	
1948	Moscow	Antonina Nekrasova; Alexander Yakovlev	Vaike Paduri (née Kaljuvee); Robert Kärsin	Ms. B. Pertsova; Mr. E. Shumilov	
1949	Gorky	Antonina Nekrasova; Alexander Yakovlev	Ms. B. Pertsova; Mr. E. Shumilov	No other competitors	
1950	Kalinin	Antonina Nekrasova; Alexander Yakovlev	Larisa Novozhilova; Samson Glazer	Ms. B. Pertsova; Mr. E. Shumilov	
1951	Tula	Larisa Novozhilova; Samson Glazer	Ms. B. Pertsova; Mr. E. Shumilov	Antonina Nekrasova; Alexander Yakovlev	
1952	Moscow	No ice dance competition			
1953	Yaroslavl	Antonina Nekrasova; Alexander Yakovlev	Larisa Novozhilova; Samson Glazer	Ms. B. Pertsova; Mr. E. Shumilov	
1954–58	No ice dance competitions				
1959	Moscow	Svetlana Smirnova; Mr. V. Belitsky	Ms. A. Sushchinskaya; Mr. V. Tomilin	Olga Polonskaya; Vladimir Markin	
1960–62	No ice dance competitions				
1963	Moscow	Nadezhda Velle; Alexander Treshchev	Valentina Lekomtseva; Igor Chikishev	No other competitors	
1964	Kirov	Lyudmila Pakhomova; Viktor Ryzhkin	Nadezhda Velle; Alexander Treshchev	Valentina Lekomtseva; Igor Chikishev	
1965	Kyiv	Lyudmila Pakhomova; Viktor Ryzhkin	Irina Grishkova; Alexander Treshschev	Natalia Bakh; Vladimir Pavlikhin	
1966	Gorky	Lyudmila Pakhomova; Viktor Ryzhkin	Irina Grishkova; Alexander Treshschev	Nadezhda Velle; Sergei Shirokov	
1967	Kuybyshev	Irina Grishkova; Viktor Ryzhkin	Lyudmila Pakhomova; Aleksandr Gorshkov	Elena Slepova; Alexander Treshschev	
1968	Voskresensk	Irina Grishkova; Viktor Ryzhkin	Lyudmila Pakhomova; Aleksandr Gorshkov	Tatiana Voitiuk; Viacheslav Zhigalin	
1969	Leningrad	Lyudmila Pakhomova; Aleksandr Gorshkov	Tatiana Voitiuk; Viacheslav Zhigalin	Elena Zharkova; Gennadi Karponosov	
1970	Kyiv	Lyudmila Pakhomova; Aleksandr Gorshkov	Tatiana Voitiuk; Viacheslav Zhigalin	Elena Zharkova; Gennadi Karponosov	
1971	Riga	Lyudmila Pakhomova; Aleksandr Gorshkov	Tatiana Voitiuk; Viacheslav Zhigalin	Elena Zharkova; Gennadi Karponosov	
1972	Minsk	Tatiana Voitiuk; Viacheslav Zhigalin	Elena Zharkova; Gennadi Karponosov	Irina Moiseeva; Andrei Minenkov	
1973	Rostov-on-Don	Lyudmila Pakhomova; Aleksandr Gorshkov	Tatiana Voitiuk; Viacheslav Zhigalin	Irina Moiseeva; Andrei Minenkov	
1974	Sverdlovsk	Lyudmila Pakhomova; Aleksandr Gorshkov	Irina Moiseeva; Andrei Minenkov	Svetlana Alexeeva; Alexander Boychuk	
1975	Kyiv	Lyudmila Pakhomova; Aleksandr Gorshkov	Natalia Linichuk; Gennadi Karponosov	Irina Moiseeva; Andrei Minenkov	
1976	Volgograd	Natalia Linichuk; Gennadi Karponosov	Lidia Karavaeva; Viacheslav Zhigalin	Marina Zoueva; Andrei Vitman	
1977	Vilnius	Irina Moiseeva; Andrei Minenkov	Natalia Linichuk; Gennadi Karponosov	Marina Zoueva; Andrei Vitman	
1978	Sverdlovsk	Natalia Karamysheva; Rostislav Sinicyn	Elena Garanina; Igor Zavozin	Natalia Bestemianova; Andrei Bukin	
1979	Zaporizhzhia	Natalia Linichuk; Gennadi Karponosov	Irina Moiseeva; Andrei Minenkov	Natalia Karamysheva; Rostislav Sinicyn	
1980	Kharkiv	Natalia Karamysheva; Rostislav Sinicyn	Natalia Bestemianova; Andrei Bukin	Olga Voložinskaja; Alexander Svinin	
1981	Odesa	Natalia Linichuk; Gennadi Karponosov	Irina Moiseeva; Andrei Minenkov	Natalia Bestemianova; Andrei Bukin	
1982	Riga	Natalia Bestemianova; Andrei Bukin	Irina Moiseeva; Andrei Minenkov	Olga Voložinskaja; Alexander Svinin	
1983	Chelyabinsk	Natalia Bestemianova; Andrei Bukin	Olga Voložinskaja; Alexander Svinin	Natalia Karamysheva; Rostislav Sinicyn	
1984	Leningrad	Elena Batanova; Alexei Soloviev	Maya Usova; Alexander Zhulin	Natalia Annenko; Genrikh Sretenski	
1985	Dnipropetrovsk	Marina Klimova; Sergei Ponomarenko	Natalia Bestemianova; Andrei Bukin	Natalia Annenko; Genrikh Sretenski	
1986	Leningrad	Marina Klimova; Sergei Ponomarenko	Natalia Annenko; Genrikh Sretenski	Maya Usova; Alexander Zhulin	
1987	Vilnius	Natalia Bestemianova; Andrei Bukin	Natalia Annenko; Genrikh Sretenski	Maya Usova; Alexander Zhulin	
1988	Yerevan	Natalia Bestemianova; Andrei Bukin	Natalia Annenko; Genrikh Sretenski	Svetlana Liapina; Gorsha Sur	
1989	Kyiv	Marina Klimova; Sergei Ponomarenko	Maya Usova; Alexander Zhulin	Natalia Annenko; Genrikh Sretenski	
1990	Leningrad	Marina Klimova; Sergei Ponomarenko	Maya Usova; Alexander Zhulin	Oksana Grishuk; Evgeni Platov	
1991	Minsk	Maya Usova; Alexander Zhulin	Oksana Grishuk; Evgeni Platov	Ilona Melnichenko; Gennady Kaskov	
1992	Kyiv	Oksana Grishuk; Evgeni Platov	Anjelika Krylova; Vladimir Fedorov	Irina Romanova; Igor Yaroshenko	

== Records ==
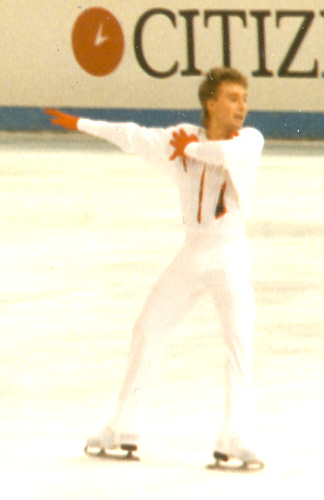
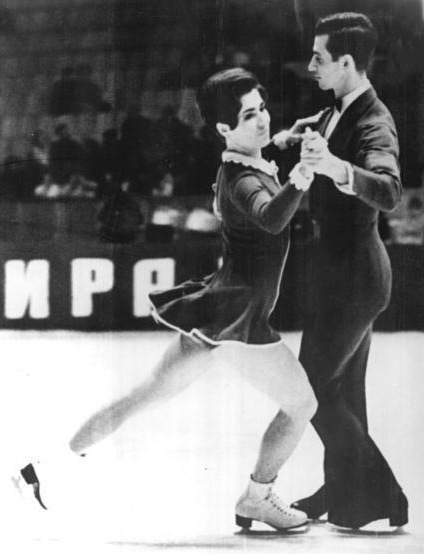
From left to right: Alexandre Fadeev won six Soviet Championship titles in men's singles, while Lyudmila Pakhomova and Aleksandr Gorshkov won six Soviet Championship titles in ice dance.

Records
Discipline	Most championship titles			
Discipline	Skater(s)	No.	Years	Ref.
Men's singles	Sergei Chetverukhin	6	1967–71; 1973	
Men's singles	Alexandre Fadeev	6	1983; 1986–90	
Women's singles	Julia Katkhanova	6	1947–52	
Pairs	Tatyana Tolmachova; Alexander Tolmachev	10	1937–38; 1941; 1945–51	
Ice dance	Lyudmila Pakhomova; Aleksandr Gorshkov	6	1969–71; 1973–75	
Ice dance	Lyudmila Pakhomova; (Note: Lyudmila Pakhomova won three championship titles while partnered with Viktor Ryzhkin (1964–66) and six with Aleksandr Gorshkov (1969–71, 1973–75).)	9	1964–66; 1969–71; 1973–75	
