= Irina Cherniaeva =

Russian pair skater

Personal information
- Native name: Ирина Евгеньевна Черняева
- Full name: Irina Evgenyevna Cherniaeva
- Other names: Tcherniaeva; Anisina
- Born: 29 October 1955 (age 70) Moscow, Russian SFSR

Figure skating career
- Country: Soviet Union

Irina Evgenyevna Cherniaeva (Russian: Ирина Евгеньевна Черняева; born 29 October 1955 in Moscow) is a Russian former pair skater who competed for the Soviet Union. With her skating partner, Vasili Blagov, she represented the Soviet Union at the 1972 Winter Olympics where they placed 6th.

As of 2018, Tcherniaeva is a skating coach at Anglet Sports de Glace in France. She is the mother of ice dancer Marina Anissina and ice hockey player Mikhail Anisin, and is of Ukrainian descent.

== Competitive highlights ==
(with Blagov)

International
| Event | 1972 | 1973 |
|---|---|---|
| Winter Olympics | 6th | |
| World Championships | 6th | 7th |
| European Championships | 6th | 5th |
National
| Soviet Championships | 1st | 2nd |
