= Konstantin Kokora =

Soviet figure skater (1957–2025)

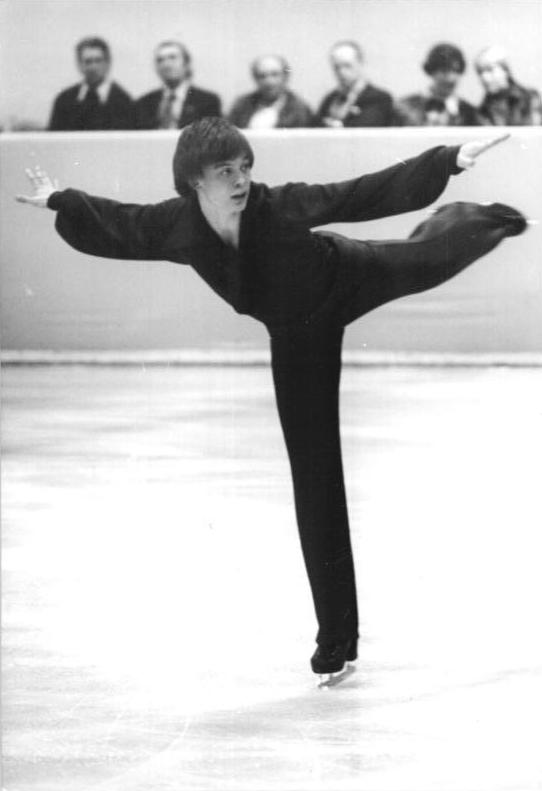
- Kokora at the Blue Swords competition in 1976

Personal information
- Full name: Konstantin Leonidovich Kokora
- Born: 27 August 1957 Moscow, Russian SFSR, USSR
- Died: 18 June 2025 (aged 67)

Figure skating career
- Country: Soviet Union
- Retired: 1982

Konstantin Leonidovich Kokora (Russian: Константин Леонидович Кокора; 27 August 1957 – 18 June 2025) was a Russian competitive figure skater. He was the 1979 Soviet national champion and finished 10th at the 1980 Winter Olympics. Kokora died on 18 June 2025, at the age of 67.

== Results ==
International
Event	1972–73	1973–74	1974–75	1975–76	1976–77	1977–78	1978–79	1979–80	1980–81	1981–82
Olympics								10th		
Worlds				11th	11th	13th	11th			
Europeans					6th		6th	8th		
Blue Swords	3rd		1st		1st					
Moscow News		6th		3rd			1st		2nd	
Prague Skate		5th	3rd	2nd						
Universiade									1st	
National
Soviet Championships		5th	4th	4th	5th	3rd	1st	3rd	4th	6th
