= Alexander Gavrilov (figure skater) =

Russian pair skater (born 1943)

Personal information
- Full name: Alexander Yevgenyevich Gavrilov
- Born: 5 December 1943 (age 82) Novosibirsk, Russian SFSR, Soviet Union

Figure skating career
- Country: Soviet Union
- Skating club: Dynamo St. Petersburg
- Retired: 1964
Medal record
Representing Soviet Union
Pairs' Figure skating
World Championships
Bronze medal – third place	1963 Cortina d'Ampezzo	Pairs
European Championships
Bronze medal – third place	1964 Grenoble	Pairs
Bronze medal – third place	1963 Budapest	Pairs

Alexander Yevgenyevich Gavrilov (Russian: Александр Евгеньевич Гаврилов; born 5 December 1943) is a Russian pair skater who competed internationally for the Soviet Union. With partner Tatiana Zhuk, he is the World bronze medalist and the 1963 & 1964 European bronze medalist. They placed 5th at the 1964 Winter Olympics. He also competed one season with Tamara Moskvina, winning the 1965 Soviet Championships.

== Results ==
=== With Zhuk ===
International
Event	1960	1961	1962	1963	1964
Winter Olympics					5th
World Championships				3rd	6th
European Championships	10th			3rd	3rd
National
Soviet Championships	1st	3rd	2nd	2nd	

=== With Moskvina ===
National
Event	1965
Soviet Championships	1st
