= Vladimir Kurenbin =

Soviet figure skater (1946–2025)

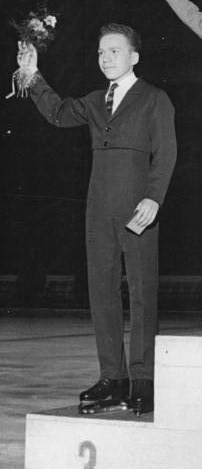
- Kurenbin at the 1964 Prague Skate

Personal information
- Native name: Владимир Иванович Куренбин
- Full name: Vladimir Ivanovich Kurenbin
- Born: 15 May 1946
- Died: 8 October 2025 (aged 79) Saint Petersburg, Russia
- Home town: Leningrad, Russia

Figure skating career
- Country: Soviet Union
- Retired: 1970

Vladimir Ivanovich Kurenbin (Russian: Владимир Иванович Куренбин, 15 May 1946 – 8 October 2025) was a Soviet figure skater. He was the 1964 Prague Skate bronze medalist, the 1967 Blue Swords silver medalist, and a five-time Soviet national medalist. A native of Leningrad, he was coached by Igor Moskvin. His only major international competition was the 1968 European Championships, where he finished tenth.

Kurenbin died in Saint Petersburg on 8 October 2025, at the age of 79.

== Results ==
International
Event	62–63	63–64	64–65	65–66	66–67	67–68	68–69	69–70
European Champ.						10th		
Blue Swords						2nd	3rd	
Prague Skate			3rd					
National
Soviet Champ.	2nd	4th	4th	3rd	2nd	3rd	2nd	4th

== Sources ==
- Skatabase
