= Dmitri Gromov (figure skater) =

Soviet figure skater

Personal information
- Born: 3 December 1967 (age 58) Leningrad, Russian SFSR, Soviet Union

Figure skating career
- Country: Soviet Union
- Retired: 1990

Dmitri Gromov (Russian: Дмитрий Громов, born 3 December 1967) is a former competitive figure skater for the Soviet Union. He placed fourth at the 1989 European Championships. After retiring from competition, he performed in ice shows.

== Competitive highlights ==
International
Event	84–85	85–86	86–87	87–88	88–89	89–90
World Championships					14th	
European Championships					4th	
NHK Trophy				5th		
International de Paris					5th	
Prague Skate				3rd		
Prize of Moscow News		9th		10th	5th	
National
Soviet Championships	5th				2nd	3rd
