= Anna Antonova =

Soviet figure skater

Personal information
- Full name: Anna Sergeevna Antonova
- Other names: Antonova Weber
- Born: 18 September 1965 (age 60) Kharkiv, Ukrainian SSR, Soviet Union

Figure skating career
- Country: Soviet Union
- Retired: 1986

Anna Sergeevna Antonova Weber (Russian: Анна Sergeevna Антонова, born 18 September 1965) is a former competitive figure skater who represented the Soviet Union. She is the 1981 World Junior bronze medalist and a three-time Soviet national medalist. She finished in the top ten at the 1982 and 1983 European Championships. Her coach was Alexei Mishin.

As of 2017, Antonova Weber coaches skating in Évry, Essonne, France.

== Results ==
International
Event	80–81	81–82	82–83	83–84	84–85	85–86
European Champ.		10th	7th			
Ennia Challenge			3rd			
NHK Trophy		7th				
Prize of Moscow News		4th	3rd	4th	4th	
International: Junior
World Junior Champ.	3rd					
National
Soviet Champ.	5th	2nd	3rd	3rd		10th
