= Yuri Kvashnin =

Russian former pair skater (born 1964)

Personal information
- Born: 24 November 1964 Moscow, Russian SFSR, Soviet Union
- Died: 10 November 2011 (aged 46)

Figure skating career
- Country: Soviet Union
- Skating club: CSKA Moscow
- Retired: 1984

Yuri Kvashnin (Russian: Юрий Квашнин, 24 November 1964 – 10 November 2011) was a Russian pair skater who competed for the Soviet Union. With Marina Avstriyskaya, he won gold at the 1982 and 1983 World Junior Championships and competed at the 1984 Winter Olympics, placing ninth.

== Results ==
Pairs with Avstriskaya:

International
Event	1981–82	1982–83	1983–84
Winter Olympics			9th
European Champ.		5th	5th
NHK Trophy		3rd	
International: Junior
World Junior Champ.	1st	1st	
National
Soviet Champ.		3rd	2nd
Spartakiada	1st J		
J = Junior level
