= Igor Bobrin =

Russian former competitive figure skater (born 1953)

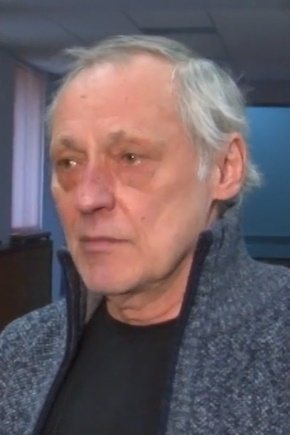

Personal information
- Full name: Igor Anatolyevich Bobrin
- Born: 14 November 1953 (age 72) Leningrad, Soviet Union
- Height: 1.75 m (5 ft 9 in)

Figure skating career
- Country: Soviet Union
- Coach: Igor Moskvin, Yuri Ovchinnikov
Medal record
Representing the Soviet Union
Men's Figure skating
World Championships
Bronze medal – third place	1981 Hartford	Men's singles
European Championships
Bronze medal – third place	1982 Lyon	Men's singles
Gold medal – first place	1981 Innsbruck	Men's singles

Igor Anatolyevich Bobrin (Russian: Игорь Анатольевич Бобрин) (born 14 November 1953) is a Russian former competitive figure skater who represented the Soviet Union. He is the 1981 European champion, the 1981 World bronze medalist, and a four-time (1978, 1980–1982) Soviet national champion. Bobrin placed 6th at the 1980 Winter Olympics.

== Career ==
During his competitive career, Bobrin was known for being a particularly creative free skater. He invented an unusual horizontal-twisting jump sometimes called a "log jump" or "Bobrinover". At one of his first international competitions, the 1972 Winter Universiade, a contemporary review noted that even the pros were puzzled by the jump, which was described as "somewhat like an Arabian cartwheel, only performed going straight ahead". He was coached by Igor Moskvin and since 1980 by Yuri Ovchinnikov.

Following his competitive career, Bobrin created his own ice theater. He currently skates with Moscow Stars On Ice and works as a coach and choreographer. He choreographed Elena Berezhnaya and Anton Sikharulidze's competitive Chaplin program.

In 2011–2012, Bobrin appeared on the panel of judges for the television show "Cup of Professionals" on Russian television Channel One.

== Personal life ==
Bobrin was first married to Natalia Ovchinnikova, with whom he has a son, Maxim, born in 1977. In 1983 he married the future Olympic champion in ice dancing, Natalia Bestemianova.

== Results ==
International
Event	71–72	72–73	73–74	74–75	75–76	76–77	77–78	78–79	79–80	80–81	81–82	82–83
Olympics									6th			
Worlds					8th		5th	10th	7th	3rd	7th	
Europeans							4th	5th	4th	1st	3rd	
Moscow News	4th		3rd	5th		4th	3rd	2nd	1st	1st	2nd	
Prague Skate		8th										
Universiade	10th											
National
Soviet Champ.	3rd	4th	4th	6th	3rd	4th	1st	2nd	1st	1st	1st	2nd
