= Elena Vodorezova =

Russian figure skater

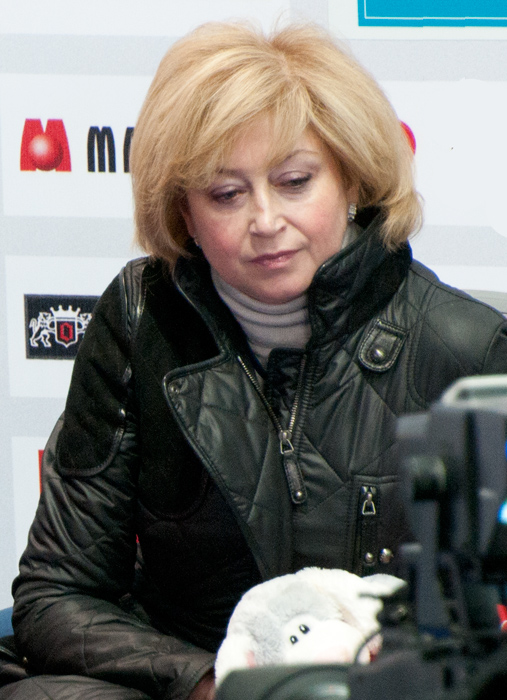

Personal information
- Full name: Elena Germanovna Vodorezova
- Other names: Buianova/Buyanova
- Born: 21 May 1963 (age 63) Moscow, Russian SFSR, Soviet Union

Figure skating career
- Country: Soviet Union
- Coach: Stanislav Zhuk
- Skating club: CSKA Moscow
- Retired: 1984
Medal record
Representing the Soviet Union
Figure skating: Ladies' singles
World Championships
Bronze medal – third place	1983 Helsinki	Ladies' singles
European Championships
Silver medal – second place	1983 Dortmund	Ladies' singles
Bronze medal – third place	1978 Strasbourg	Ladies' singles
Bronze medal – third place	1982 Lyon	Ladies' singles
- Elena Vodorezova's voice Vodorezova on the Echo of Moscow program, 1 March 2014

Elena Germanovna Buianova (Russian: Елена Германовна Буянова, née Vodorezova, Водорезова; born 21 May 1963) is a Russian figure skating coach and retired competitive skater who represented the Soviet Union. She is the 1983 World bronze medalist and three-time European medalist.

== Career ==
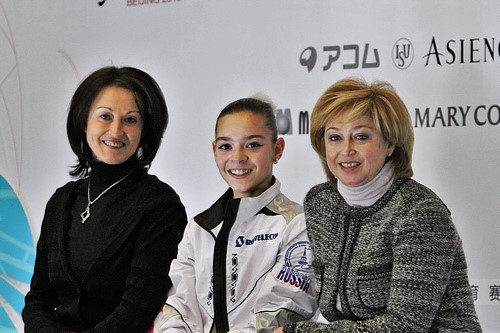
Vodorezova-Buianova with Adelina Sotnikova and Irina Tagaeva

Vodorezova was coached by Stanislav Zhuk at the Armed Forces sports society in Moscow. A gifted free-skater, she represented her country at the 1976 Winter Olympics aged just 12. She was the first skater to complete a double flip-triple toe loop combination. She was noted for a spectacularly high double Axel and fast spins. She won the bronze medal at the 1978 European Championships; it was the first time a Soviet ladies' single skater had won a medal at the event. She missed the 1979–1981 seasons completely due to severe juvenile arthritis, which prevented her from even walking for months in 1979.

She won a second bronze medal at the 1982 Europeans and silver at the 1983 event. She also won bronze at the 1983 World Championships – the first World medal for a Soviet female single skater. Vodorezova placed 8th at the 1984 Winter Olympics. She retired from competition in 1984. That year, she married a former skater, Sergey Buianov, and in 1987 gave birth to a son, Ivan.

She began coaching at the CSKK Club in Moscow. Irina Tagaeva often choreographs for her students. Her former pupils include:

- Adelina Sotnikova
- Maxim Kovtun
- Elene Gedevanishvili
- Olga Markova
- Andrei Griazev
- Artem Borodulin
- Artur Dmitriev Jr
- Denis Ten
- Alexander Samarin
- Adian Pitkeev
- Alexandra Proklova
- Maria Sotskova
- Anastasiia Gubanova
- Polina Tsurskaya
- Elena Radionova
- Egor Rukhin
- Brendan Kerry

Buianova's current students include:

- Artur Danielian
- Alena Kostornaia

== Competitive highlights ==
International
Event	75–76	76–77	77–78	79–80	81–82	82–83	83–84
Olympics	12th						8th
Worlds	11th	7th	6th	WD	5th	3rd	
Europeans	8th	5th	3rd		3rd	2nd	WD
Moscow News	1st	1st					
National
Soviet Champ.	1st	1st		1st	1st	1st	
WD = Withdrew
