= Valery Meshkov =

Soviet figure skater (1945–2024)

- Meshkov in 1964

Personal information
- Native name: Валерий Иванович Мешков
- Full name: Valery Ivanovich Meshkov
- Born: 9 August 1945 Moscow, Russian SFSR, USSR
- Died: 28 October 2024 (aged 79)

Figure skating career
- Country: Soviet Union
- Coach: Larisa Novozhilova; Stanislav Zhuk
- Retired: 1969

Valery Ivanovich Meshkov (Russian: Валерий Иванович Мешков; 9 August 1945 – 28 October 2024) was a figure skater who competed for the Soviet Union. He was the 1964 Winter Universiade bronze medalist and a four-time Soviet national champion. His best ISU Championship result, seventh, came at the 1963 Europeans in Budapest, Hungary. He withdrew from the 1964 Winter Olympics in Innsbruck, Austria.

Meshkov died on 28 October 2024, at the age of 79.

== Results ==
International
Event	59–60	60–61	61–62	62–63	63–64	64–65	65–66	66–67	67–68	68–69
Olympics					WD					
Worlds			14th	16th	15th		17th			
Europeans	19th		10th	7th	WD		11th			
Universiade					3rd					
Blue Swords				3rd						2nd
Prague Skate							3rd			
National
Soviet Champ.	4th	1st	1st	3rd	1st	2nd	1st		2nd	4th
WD: Withdrew
