= Viktor Ryzhkin =

Russian ice dancer

Personal information
- Full name: Viktor Ivanovich Ryzhkin
- Born: 26 April 1937 (age 89) Moscow, Russian SFSR, Soviet Union

Figure skating career
- Country: Soviet Union

Viktor Ivanovich Ryzhkin (Russian: Виктор Иванович Рыжкин; born 26 April 1937 in Moscow) is a former ice dancer who competed for the Soviet Union. With Lyudmila Pakhomova, whom he had initially coached, he won three Soviet national titles and placed 10th at the 1966 World Championships. Their partnership ended in 1966. With his next partner Irina Grishkova, Ryzhkin finished 4th at the 1968 European Championships and 5th at the 1968 World Championships. They won gold medals at the 1967 Prague Skate and twice at the Prize of Moscow News.

After retiring from competition, Ryzhkin worked as a skating coach at CSKA Moscow.

== Results ==
=== With Pakhomova ===
International
Event	1964	1965	1966
World Championships			10th
European Championships			7th
National
Soviet Championships	1st	1st	1st

=== With Grishkova ===
International
Event	1966–67	1967–68
World Championships	7th	5th
European Championships	8th	4th
Prague Skate	3rd	1st
Prize of Moscow News	1st	1st
National
Soviet Championships	1st	1st
