= Aleksandr Gorelik =

Soviet pair skater (1945–2012)

Olympic medal record

Figure skating
Silver medal – second place	1968 Grenoble	Pairs

Aleksandr Gorelik
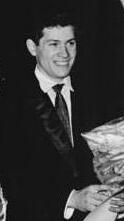
- Aleksandr Gorelik in 1962

Personal information
- Full name: Aleksandr Yudaevich Gorelik
- Born: 9 August 1945 Moscow, Russian SFSR, Soviet Union
- Died: 27 September 2012 (aged 67)

Figure skating career
- Country: Soviet Union
- Retired: 1969
Medal record
Representing Soviet Union
Pairs' Figure skating
Olympic Games
Silver medal – second place	1968 Grenoble	Pairs
World Championships
Silver medal – second place	1968 Geneva	Pairs
Silver medal – second place	1966 Davos	Pairs
Bronze medal – third place	1965 Colorado Springs	Pairs
European Championships
Silver medal – second place	1968 Västerås	Pairs
Silver medal – second place	1966 Bratislava	Pairs
Bronze medal – third place	1965 Moscow	Pairs

Aleksandr Yudaevich Gorelik (Russian: Александр Юдаевич Горелик; 9 August 1945 – 27 September 2012) was a Soviet pair skater. He competed with Tatiana Zhuk. They are the 1965 World bronze medalists and the 1966 and 1968 World silver medalists. At the European Figure Skating Championships, they won the bronze medal in 1965 and the silver in 1966. They won the silver medal at the 1968 Winter Olympics.

== Personal life and career ==
Gorelik is Jewish. Earlier in his career, he competed with Tatiana Sharanova. They placed 7th at the 1964 European Championships. They were the first in the world pair with a great difference in height. Earlier in his career, he competed with Tatiana Sharanova. They placed 7th at the 1964 European Championships. They were the first in the world pair with a great difference in height.

His competitive career ended in 1969 when Zhuk became pregnant. She and her husband Albert Shesternyov decided to keep the baby and retire from competitive skating. Gorelik did not want to look for a new partner and start skating over again. After trying without success to train with Irina Rodnina, he also retired. Gorelik worked as a figure skating commentator on radio and was invited to play the main role (Sergei Berestov) in 1969 movie about figure skating Goluboi led.

He performed at circus on ice shows with Tatiana Zhuk and later worked as a coach. He was a figure skating commentator for Russia TV for a time.

== Results ==
=== With Sharanova ===
International
Event	1961–62	1962–63	1963–64
World Championships			15th
European Championships			7th
Blue Swords		3rd	
National
Soviet Championships	3rd	6th	2nd

=== With Zhuk ===
International
Event	1965	1966	1967	1968
Winter Olympics				2nd
World Championships	3rd	2nd		2nd
European Championships	3rd	2nd		
National
Soviet Championships		2nd		

== See also ==
- List of select Jewish figure skaters
