= Lyudmila Smirnova =

Soviet pair skater

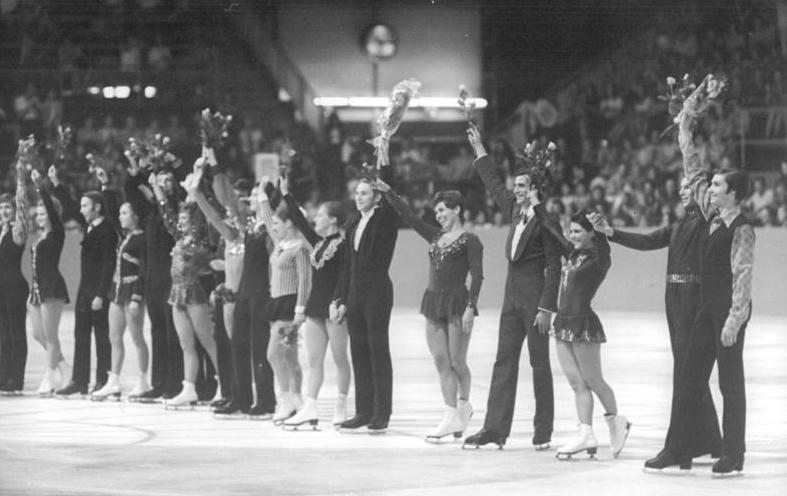

Personal information
- Full name: Lyudmila Stanislavovna Smirnova
- Born: July 21, 1947 (age 78) Moscow

Figure skating career
- Country: Soviet Union
- Retired: 1974
Medal record
Representing Soviet Union
Pairs' Figure skating
Olympic Games
Silver medal – second place	1972 Sapporo	Pairs
World Championships
Silver medal – second place	1974 Munich	Pairs
Silver medal – second place	1973 Bratislava	Pairs
Silver medal – second place	1972 Calgary	Pairs
Silver medal – second place	1971 Lyon	Pairs
Silver medal – second place	1970 Ljubljana	Pairs
European Championships
Bronze medal – third place	1974 Zagreb	Pairs
Silver medal – second place	1973 Cologne	Pairs
Silver medal – second place	1972 Gothenburg	Pairs
Silver medal – second place	1971 Zürich	Pairs
Silver medal – second place	1970 Leningrad	Pairs

Lyudmila Stanislavovna Smirnova (Russian: Людмила Станиславовна Смирнова; born July 21, 1949, in Leningrad) is a retired pair skater who competed for the Soviet Union. With partner Andrei Suraikin, she is the 1972 Winter Olympic silver medalist. With her then-husband Alexei Ulanov, she is a two-time World silver medalist.

== Career ==
Smirnova began figure skating in 1955 and became a member of the USSR National Team in 1968. She trained in Leningrad at Spartak and competed initially with Suraikin. Smirnova and Suraikin were coached by Maya Belenkaya. They were the 2nd strongest Soviet pair behind Irina Rodnina and Alexei Ulanov, and placed second behind them at both the World and European Championships three times (1970–1972).

Smirnova and Ulanov, skating for rival teams, fell in love. The pairs decided to separate—a decision they made before the 1972 Games. Rodnina and Ulanov won the gold, and Smirnova and Suraikin the silver. Thereafter, Smirnova began skating with Ulanov.

Smirnova and Ulanov competed for two seasons. They won silver medals at the 1973 World and European Championships. The next season, they won European bronze and World silver medals.

In 1972, Smirnova was awarded the Medal For Labour Heroism.

== Personal life ==
Smirnova and Ulanov married and later divorced after having two children, Nikolai Ulanov and Irina Ulanova. Their daughter, Irina Ulanova, is a former pair skater who skated with Alexander Smirnov, and Maxim Trankov for about three years.

== Results ==
(with Suraikin)

Event	1968-1969	1969–1970	1970–1971	1971–1972
Winter Olympic Games				2nd
World Championships		2nd	2nd	2nd
European Championships		2nd	2nd	2nd
Prize of Moscow News		2nd	1st	2nd
Winter Universiade		1st		
Soviet Championships	4th	2nd	2nd	
USSR Cup	2nd			

=== With Ulanov ===
Event	1972–1973	1973–1974
World Championships	2nd	2nd
European Championships	2nd	3rd
Soviet Championships	3rd	
Prize of Moscow News		1st
