= Marina Serova =

Personal information
- Born: 1966 (age 59–60)

Figure skating career
- Country: Soviet Union
- Retired: 1986

Marina Serova (Russian: Марина Серова, born in 1966) is a former competitive figure skater for the Soviet Union. She is the 1981 World Junior silver medalist and a two-time Soviet national medalist. She was coached by Alexei Mishin.

Serova married figure skater Yuri Bureiko and turned to coaching after retiring from competition. Based in Coventry, she has coached Jenna McCorkell, Elliot Hilton, David Richardson, and Phillip Harris.

== Competitive highlights ==
International
Event	80–81	81–82	82–83	83–84	84–85	85–86
Winter Universiade					11th	
Prague Skate				9th		
Prize of Moscow News		6th	6th	5th		
International: Junior
World Junior Champ.	2nd					
National
Soviet Champ.	3rd	4th		2nd	5th	9th
