= Igor Ksenofontov =

Figure skating coach

- Игорь Борисович Ксенофонтов
- Born: January 19, 1939; Sverdlovsk, USSR
- Died: June 13, 1999 (aged 60); Kazan, Russia
- Resting place: Yekaterinburg
- Education: Siberian Academy of Physical Culture
- Occupation: figure skating coach
- Spouse: Galina Abramycheva
- Children: 1
- Awards: Order of the Badge of Honour, Medal "Veteran of Labour"

Igor Borisovich Ksenofontov (Russian: Игорь Борисович Ксенофонтов; 19 January 1939 – 13 June 1999) was a Soviet and Russian figure skating coach, founder of the Yekaterinburg figure skating school, president of the Sverdlovsk Figure Skating Federation. He was considered to be one of the best Soviet coaches.

== Career ==
Ksenofontov was born in Sverdlovsk in the family of metallurgical engineer Boris Maksimovich Ksenofontov, professor at the Ural State Technical University, and Galina Seregina, professor at the Ural State Mining University. He had a younger sister Tatyana. Although his parents didn't consider it a serious occupation, he liked sport from the very young age and took part in regional competitions in volleyball, swimming, figure skating. As a member of Sverdlovsk figure skating team, he was coached by Evgeny Kuzminykh.

After he graduated from school Ksenofontov spend a year working in metallurgy, which he later remembered as a job for "strong men", but monotonous. In 1958 he moved to Omsk and entered the Siberian Academy of Physical Culture, after graduation in 1962 taught at the Faculty of Cycle Sport and Speed Skating. Since 1963 he had been working as a figure skating judge. In 1964 he returned to Sverdlovsk and started teaching at the Faculty of Physical Education and Sport (Ural State Technical University).

He founded the first figure skating school (Russian: СДЮСШОР №11) for children in Sverdlovsk, opened on March 1, 1969. Ksenofontov became a headmaster. Among the coaches were Agnessa Dunayeva, Nelya Dronova, Valery Dolgov, Anatoly Mikhalev, Leonid Rakultsev and others. They helped to create a unique system of skaters' selection and training. In the 1970s sportsmen from Ksenofontov's school started to show noticeable results at the international competitions (particularly in pair skating, later in ladies' single skating). By the 1980s his school was widely known in the USSR. In 1981 the USSR Sport Committee ordered Ksenofontov's school to create a group to train specifically for the national team. Ksenofontov left the headmaster's position to coach this group, and moved to Pervouralsk, which had a better ice rink.

Since 1990 he coached many figure skaters and coaches from China, the Israel Olympic team at the 1994 Winter Olympics; national team of Uzbekistan in 1993—1999.

Ksenofontov died from a heart failure in a train on his way to Bulgaria, in Kazan.

== Personal life ==
In 1975 Ksenofontov met his wife Galina Abramycheva (Sizova), an architect. Their son Alexey was born in 1979.

Ksenofontov also sharpened and repaired figure-skate blades.[3]

== Orders and medals ==
- Order of the Badge of Honour (1971)
- Merited Coaches of the RSFSR (1974)
- Medal "Veteran of Labour" (1988)
