= Igor Moskvin =

Russian figure skater and coach (1929–2020)

Personal information
- Full name: Igor Borisovich Moskvin
- Born: 30 August 1929 Bezhitsa, Bryansk Oblast, Russian SFSR, Soviet Union
- Died: 10 November 2020 (aged 91)

Figure skating career
- Country: Soviet Union
- Partner: Maya Belenkaya
- Coach: Pyotr Orlov; Nina Leplinskaya

Igor Borisovich Moskvin (Russian: Игорь Борисович Москвин; 30 August 1929 – 10 November 2020) was a Russian figure skating coach and competitor who represented the Soviet Union in pair skating with his partner Maya Belenkaya. He was an Honoured Master of Sports of the USSR and Honored Coach of the USSR.

== Personal life ==
Moskvin was born on 30 August 1929 in Bezhitsa, Bryansk Oblast. He married Tamara Moskvina (née Bratus) in 1964. They have two daughters, Olga Igorevna Moskvina (born 12 April 1970), and Anna Igorevna Moskvina (born 14 June 1974). He and his wife resided in Saint Petersburg.

Moskvin died in November 2020 after a serious illness.

== Career ==
Moskvin competed for the Soviet Union as a pair skater with partner Maya Belenkaya (Майя Беленькая). He was coached by Pyotr Orlov and Nina Leplinskaya. Aside from figure skating, he participated in yacht racing and won several sailing regattas in the 1950s. He was named an Honoured Master of Sports of the USSR.

After ending his competitive career, Moskvin began coaching in Dynamo club (Leningrad), then Burevestnik (Leningrad) and later Trud (Leningrad). He received the title of Honored Coach of the USSR. His students included:

- Ludmila Belousova / Oleg Protopopov
- Tamara Bratus (Moskvina) (five-time Soviet champion and coach). Moskvin began coaching Bratus in 1957.
- Tamara Moskvina / Alexei Mishin
- Larisa Selezneva / Oleg Makarov (1984 Olympic bronze medalists and two-time European champions)
- Igor Bobrin (European champion). Moskvin coached Bobrin for 15 years, from 1965 to 1980.
- Igor Lisovsky
- Yuri Ovchinnikov (Soviet champion)
- Vladimir Kotin (four-time European silver medalist, later coach)
- Kyoko Ina / John Zimmerman (2002 World bronze medalists)

Many of his pupils later became coaches. Tamara Moskvina said that he was able to infect people with love for coaching. When asked if there was a coaching rivalry between them, Moskvin said that he had never considered themselves rivals because he was more focused on singles while his wife was focused on pairs.

== Results ==
Event	1950	1951	1952	1953	1954	1955	1956	1957	1958
European Championships							11th		
Soviet Championships	2nd	2nd	1st	1st	1st	2nd	2nd	3rd	3rd
