= Vladimir Kovalyov =

Soviet figure skater (born 1953)

Vladimir Nikolayevich Kovalyov
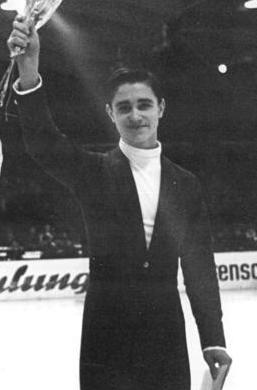
- Vladimir Kovalyov at the 1969 Blue Swords

Personal information
- Born: 2 February 1953 (age 73)
- Height: 5 ft 9 in (175 cm)

Figure skating career
- Country: Soviet Union
- Skating club: VSS Trud
- Retired: 1980
Medal record
Figure skating: Men's singles
Representing the Soviet Union
Olympic Games
Silver medal – second place	1976 Innsbruck	Men's singles
World Championships
Gold medal – first place	1979 Vienna	Men's singles
Gold medal – first place	1977 Tokyo	Men's singles
Silver medal – second place	1976 Gothenburg	Men's singles
Silver medal – second place	1975 Colorado Springs	Men's singles
Bronze medal – third place	1972 Calgary	Men's singles
European Championships
Bronze medal – third place	1980 Gothenburg	Men's singles
Silver medal – second place	1979 Zagreb	Men's singles
Silver medal – second place	1978 Strasbourg	Men's singles
Silver medal – second place	1977 Helsinki	Men's singles
Silver medal – second place	1976 Geneva	Men's singles
Gold medal – first place	1975 Copenhagen	Men's singles
Soviet Championships
Gold medal – first place	1972 Minsk	Men's singles
Gold medal – first place	1977 Vilnius	Men's singles
Silver medal – second place	1978 Sverdlovsk	Men's singles
Bronze medal – third place	1974 Sverdlovsk	Men's singles
Bronze medal – third place	1975 Kyiv	Men's singles

Vladimir Nikolayevich Kovalyov (Russian: Владимир Николаевич Ковалёв; born 2 February 1953) is a retired Soviet-Russian figure skater who competed internationally for the USSR. He is an Olympic silver medalist and two-time World champion. He trained at VSS Trud in Moscow.

== Career ==
Kovalyov placed second behind his British rival John Curry at the 1976 Winter Olympics. However, Kovalyov's short and free programs were filled with mistakes and the audience was displeased when the results were announced that he had placed ahead of such skaters as Toller Cranston and Jan Hoffmann. Kovalyov went on to win the gold at the World Championships in 1977 and 1979, and he was also the winner of the European Championships in 1975.

While Kovalyov entered the 1980 season as a top contender for the 1980 Lake Placid Olympics title, he was clearly poorly trained, overweight and uninspired. As a result, his jumps had become too inconsistent. For example, weeks prior to the Olympics, Kovalyov had placed 3rd at the 1980 European Championships with poor short and free programs, far behind his chief rivals, Robin Cousins and Jan Hoffmann. Once in Lake Placid, skating officials and news reporters took note of the fact that Kovalyov, perhaps unmotivated and skeptical of his chances, missed most of the practice sessions. When he did show up, he was even unable to complete basic jumps. After observing his practices, an American reporter asked Kovalyov at the pre-competition press conference, "Aside from the fact that you are the best-looking male skater in the competition, do you think you have what it takes to win here?" Kovalyov burst out of the conference, never to be seen in public again as a competitor. The Soviet officials soon withdrew him from the competition after placing 5th in compulsory figures. Kovalyov retired from competitive skating, and began his career as a skating coach.

Kovalyov, along with his chief student, Kira Ivanova, were both considered high risks for defecting to the West. Kovalyov also coached Natalia Lebedeva and Maria Butyrskaya, when her first coach, Sergei Volkov, died of cancer.

== Results ==
International
Event	69–70	70–71	71–72	72–73	73–74	74–75	75–76	76–77	77–78	78–79	79–80
Winter Olympics			8th				2nd				WD
World Champ.			3rd		4th	2nd	2nd	1st	4th	1st	
European Champ.			6th		4th	1st	2nd	2nd	2nd	2nd	3rd
Moscow News	2nd	3rd	2nd		1st	1st	1st	1st			
Prague Skate		2nd									
National
Soviet Champ.	5th	4th	1st		3rd	3rd		1st	2nd		
WD = Withdrew
