= Nina Zhuk =

Soviet figure skater

Personal information
- Full name: Nina Alexeevna Zhuk
- Other names: Nina Alexeevna Bakusheva
- Born: 9 July 1934 (age 92)

Figure skating career
- Country: Soviet Union
- Coach: Pyotr Orlov
- Skating club: Dynamo, Leningrad
- Retired: 1961
Medal record
Representing Soviet Union
Pairs' Figure skating
European Championships
Silver medal – second place	1960 Garmisch-Partenkirchen	Pairs
Silver medal – second place	1959 Davos	Pairs
Silver medal – second place	1958 Bratislava	Pairs

Nina Alexeevna Zhuk (nee: Bakusheva) (Russian: Нина Алексеевна Жук (Бакушева); born 9 July 1934 in Savino, Yaroslavl Oblast) is a retired pair skater who represented the Soviet Union in competition. With her husband Stanislav Zhuk, she is the 1958–1960 European silver medalist. They placed 6th at the 1960 Winter Olympics.

== Competitive highlights ==
(with Zhuk)

Event	1954	1955	1956	1957	1958	1959	1960	1961
Winter Olympic Games							6th	
World Championships					8th		5th	
European Championships				6th	2nd	2nd	2nd	
Soviet Championships	3rd		3rd	1st	1st	1st		1st
