= Oleg Makarov (figure skater) =

Russian pair skater

Personal information
- Full name: Oleg Vitalyevich Makarov
- Born: October 22, 1962 (age 64) Leningrad, Russian SFSR, Soviet Union

Figure skating career
- Country: Soviet Union
- Partner: Larisa Selezneva
- Coach: Igor Moskvin
- Skating club: Zenit Leningrad; SKA Leningrad
- Retired: 1990
Medal record
Figure skating
Representing Soviet Union
Olympic Games
Bronze medal – third place	1984 Sarajevo	Pairs
World Championships
Bronze medal – third place	1988 Budapest	Pairs
Silver medal – second place	1985 Tokyo	Pairs
Bronze medal – third place	1990 Halifax	Pairs
European Championships
Silver medal – second place	1990 Leningrad	Pairs
Gold medal – first place	1989 Birmingham	Pairs
Silver medal – second place	1988 Prague	Pairs
Gold medal – first place	1987 Sarajevo	Pairs
Silver medal – second place	1985 Gothenburg	Pairs
World Junior Championships
Gold medal – first place	1981 London, ON	Pairs
Gold medal – first place	1980 Megève	Pairs
Silver medal – second place	1979 Augsburg	Pairs

Oleg Vitalyevich Makarov (Russian: Оле́г Вита́льевич Мака́ров; born October 22, 1962, in Leningrad) is a Russian former pair skater who represented the Soviet Union. With his wife Larisa Selezneva, he is the 1984 Olympic bronze medalist, 1985 World silver medalist, 1988 World bronze medalist, and two-time European Champion (1987, 1989). They were coached by Igor Moskvin.

== Personal life ==
Selezneva and Makarov married in 1987. The family moved from Saint Petersburg, Russia to New York in 2001, having been recommended as coaches by Tamara Moskvina and Igor Moskvin.

They have two children, a daughter, Ksenia (born December 20, 1992, in Saint Petersburg), and a son, Aleksey, who was born nine years later in the United States. Their daughter became a competitive figure skater like her parents; she is the 2010 Russian national champion and represented Russia at the 2010 Winter Olympics. The pair and their daughter became naturalized U.S. citizens on August 16, 2013.

== Figure skating career ==
Makarov trained in Leningrad (now Saint Petersburg). His first partner was Marina Petrova, with whom he competed domestically.

Selezneva and Makarov were paired together by their coaches in 1978. They won the World Junior Championships in 1980 and 1981. They then rapidly progressed in the senior ranks. In 1984, they won the bronze medal at the Sarajevo Olympics, which was the first major international competition for the pair. Makarov, along with Selezneva, was awarded the Medal for Distinguished Labor (1984).

Armed with strong pairs skills and difficult side-by-side triple jumps, they won the silver medal at the 1985 World Championships in Tokyo, almost defeating the then-reigning World and Olympic champion team, Elena Valova / Oleg Vasiliev, also from the Soviet Union. Makarov broke his knee before the 1988 Winter Olympics and competed at the event with his knee in a cast and four pain-killing shots. They finished fourth at the event and won the bronze medal at the 1988 World Championships. They also won two European titles, in 1987 and 1989. They retired from competition in 1990.

Selezneva / Makarov were one of the first pairs to regularly include side-by-side triple jumps in their programs. They were coached by Igor Moskvin.

== Coaching career ==
After settling in New York, Selezneva and Makarov began coaching at the Hudson Valley Figure Skating Club. In addition to their daughter, Ksenia, their students have also included Jacob Sanchez and Ava Marie Ziegler.

== Competitive highlights ==
Pair skating with Larisa Selezneva

International
Event	78–79	79–80	80–81	81–82	82–83	83–84	84–85	85–86	86–87	87–88	88–89	89–90
Olympics						3rd				4th		
Worlds						4th	2nd	4th	4th	3rd		4th
Europeans						4th	2nd		1st	2nd	1st	2nd
NHK Trophy											1st	2nd
Moscow News				1st	2nd		1st	1st		3rd		
Ennia Challenge				2nd	1st		1st					
International: Junior
Junior Worlds	2nd	1st	1st									
National
Soviet				5th	4th	1st	1st		2nd	1st	1st	1st
Soviet Junior	1st	1st	1st									

=== Other results ===
1990–1991

- World Professional Championships – 3rd
- World Challenge of Champions – 3rd

1991–1992

- World Challenge of Champions – 2nd

Pair skating with Marina Petrova

National: Junior
Event	1977–78
Spartakiada	11th
