= Natalia Lebedeva =

Personal information
- Full name: Natalia Borisovna Lebedeva
- Born: 16 December 1964 (age 61) Zaporizhia, Ukrainian SSR, Soviet Union

Figure skating career
- Country: Soviet Union
- Retired: 1990
Medal record
Figure skating: Ladies' singles
Representing Soviet Union
European Championships
Silver medal – second place	1990 Leningrad	Ladies' singles
Silver medal – second place	1989 Birmingham	Ladies' singles

Natalia Borisovna Lebedeva (Russian: Наталья Борисовна Лебедева, born 16 December 1964) is a former competitive figure skater who represented the Soviet Union. She is a two-time (1989 and 1990) European silver medalist, the 1988 Skate Canada International champion, and the 1990 Soviet national champion.

Her coaches included Vladimir Kovalev, Eduard Pliner, Igor Ksenofontov, Marina Obodyannikova, and Boris Rogashkin. She currently lives and coaches in Odintsovo, Moscow Region, Russia. She also serves as a figure skating judge in the Russian competitions.

== Results ==
International
Event	81–82	82–83	83–84	84–85	85–86	87–88	88–89	89–90	90–91
Worlds				7th	10th	9th	5th	5th	
Europeans				6th	4th		2nd	2nd	
Goodwill Games									7th
Skate Canada				3rd			1st	3rd	
NHK Trophy		7th							
Prague Skate		2nd							
Moscow News			3rd	2nd	3rd		2nd		
Schäfer Memorial		3rd							
Universiade		2nd							
National
Soviet Champ.	8th	5th	1st	3rd	3rd	2nd	2nd	1st	
