= Leonid Kaznakov =

Soviet figure skater

Personal information
- Native name: Леонид Юрьевич Казнаков
- Full name: Leonid Yuryevich Kaznakov
- Born: 12 December 1963 (age 62) Leningrad, Russian SFSR, Soviet Union

Figure skating career
- Country: Soviet Union
- Retired: c. 1986

Leonid Yuryevich Kaznakov (Russian: Леонид Юрьевич Казнаков; born 12 December 1963) is a former figure skater who represented the Soviet Union. He won medals at the Nebelhorn Trophy, Grand Prix International St. Gervais, and Soviet Championships. After retiring from competition, he performed in ice shows.

== Personal life ==
Kaznakov has a son, Alexey Leonidovich, born 19 October 1987, and a granddaughter, Alisa Alexeevna, born 13 March 2018.

== Competitive highlights ==
International
Event	81–82	82–83	83–84	84–85	85–86
International St. Gervais				3rd	
Nebelhorn Trophy				3rd	
Prize of Moscow News		4th		5th	5th
National
Soviet Championships	8th		2nd	3rd	4th
