= Andrei Bukin =

Russian ice dancer (born 1957)

Personal information
- Full name: Andrei Anatolyevich Bukin
- Born: 10 June 1957 (age 69) Moscow, Russian SFSR, Soviet Union
- Height: 1.85 m (6 ft 1 in)

Figure skating career
- Retired: 1988
Medal record
Figure skating
Ice dancing
Representing Soviet Union
Olympic Games
Gold medal – first place	1988 Calgary	Ice dancing
Silver medal – second place	1984 Sarajevo	Ice dancing
World Championships
Gold medal – first place	1988 Budapest	Ice dancing
Gold medal – first place	1987 Cincinnati	Ice dancing
Gold medal – first place	1986 Geneva	Ice dancing
Gold medal – first place	1985 Tokyo	Ice dancing
Silver medal – second place	1984 Ottawa	Ice dancing
Silver medal – second place	1983 Helsinki	Ice dancing
Silver medal – second place	1982 Copenhagen	Ice dancing
Bronze medal – third place	1981 Hartford	Ice dancing
European Championships
Gold medal – first place	1988 Prague	Ice dancing
Gold medal – first place	1987 Sarajevo	Ice dancing
Gold medal – first place	1986 Sarajevo	Ice dancing
Gold medal – first place	1985 Gothenburg	Ice dancing
Silver medal – second place	1984 Budapest	Ice dancing
Gold medal – first place	1983 Dortmund	Ice dancing
Silver medal – second place	1982 Lyon	Ice dancing

Andrei Anatolyevich Bukin (Russian: Андрей Анатольевич Букин, born 10 June 1957) is a Soviet and Russian former ice dancer who represented the Soviet Union in his competitive career. With his partner Natalia Bestemianova, he is the 1988 Olympic Champion, 1984 Olympic silver medalist, four-time World champion, three-time World silver medalist, and five-time European champion.

== Career ==
Bukin began figure skating at age seven, entering the Children and Youth Sports School of CSKA in Moscow. The group trained at a small stadium in Chapayevsky Park near Pesochnaya Square. At age ten, he joined Spartak and began ice dancing, originally training at the Small Sports Arena of the Central Lenin Stadium. In his early career, he was coached by Nadezhda Shirokova and his ice dancing partner was Olga Abankina, whom he married. In 1977, he joined the group of the famous coach Tatiana Tarasova, who paired him with Natalia Bestemianova. Bukin was the USSR Olympic Team Flag Bearer at the 1988 Winter Olympics. The duo capped their lengthy career by winning the gold medal there and at that year's World Championships.

== Personal life ==
Bukin married former ice dancing partner, Olga Abankina, with whom he has a son Andrei (born 1983). With his current partner, Yelena Vasyukova, a former ice dancer, he has a son, Ivan Bukin, born in 1993, who is also a competitive ice dancer.

== Competitive highlights ==
=== With Bestemianova ===
International
Event	77–78	78–79	79–80	80–81	81–82	82–83	83–84	84–85	85–86	86–87	87–88
Olympics			8th				2nd				1st
Worlds		10th		3rd	2nd	2nd	2nd	1st	1st	1st	1st
Europeans			6th	4th	2nd	1st	2nd	1st	1st	1st	1st
Skate America			2nd								
NHK Trophy										1st	1st
Moscow News		4th	2nd	3rd	1st	1st	1st	2nd	1st		
National
Soviet Champ.	3rd	4th	2nd	3rd	1st	1st		2nd		1st	

=== With Abankina ===
Event	1975–1976
Soviet Championships	5th

== Programs ==
(with Bestemianova)

Season	Original set pattern	Free dance	Exhibition
1987–1988	Tango Hernando's Hideaway	Polovtsian Dances	
1986–1987		Cabaret medley	
1985–1986		Rhapsody on a Theme of Paganini	
1984–1985		Carmen	
1983–1984	Pasodoble		
1982–1983			
1981–1982		FD: "Sabre Dance" by Aram Khatchaturian, "Romeo and Juliet" by Tchiakovsky, Finale from "William Tell" Overture by Rossini (modern piano version)	
1980–1981			
1979–1980			
