= Alexandre Fadeev =

Soviet and Russian figure skater

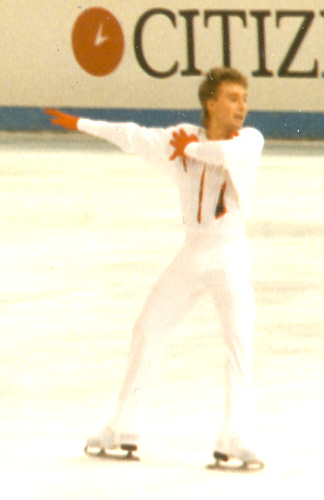
- Fadeev at the 1989 World Championships

Personal information
- Native name: Александр Владимирович Фадеев
- Full name: Alexandre Vladimirovich Fadeev
- Other names: Alexander/Aleksandr Fadeyev
- Born: 4 January 1964 (age 62) Kazan, Russian SFSR, Soviet Union
- Height: 1.65 m (5 ft 5 in)

Figure skating career
- Country: Soviet Union
- Retired: 1990
Medal record
Representing the Soviet Union
Figure skating: Men's singles
World Championships
Gold medal – first place	1985 Tokyo	Men's singles
Bronze medal – third place	1984 Ottawa	Men's singles
Bronze medal – third place	1986 Geneva	Men's singles
Bronze medal – third place	1987 Cincinnati	Men's singles
European Championships
Gold medal – first place	1984 Budapest	Men's singles
Gold medal – first place	1987 Sarajevo	Men's singles
Gold medal – first place	1988 Prague	Men's singles
Gold medal – first place	1989 Birmingham	Men's singles
Bronze medal – third place	1983 Dortmund	Men's singles
Bronze medal – third place	1986 Copenhagen	Men's singles
World Junior Championships
Gold medal – first place	1980 Megève	Men's singles
Bronze medal – third place	1979 Augsburg	Men's singles

Alexandre Vladimirovich "Sasha" Fadeev (Russian: Александр Владимирович Фадеев; born 4 January 1964) is a Russian former competitive figure skater who represented the Soviet Union. Fadeyev is the 1985 World champion and a four-time European champion.

== Personal life ==
Alexandre "Sasha" Fadeev was born in Kazan, Russian SFSR, Soviet Union. He is married to a Canadian figure skater, Cydèle Fadeeva, and resides in Illinois.

== Career ==
Fadeev won bronze at the 1979 World Junior Championships and then gold the following year. In the 1983–84 season, he won his first European title and stepped onto his first World podium, taking the bronze medal.

Fadeev won the 1985 World Championships by placing first in all three segments of the competition including compulsory figures and the short and long programs. He took the gold medal ahead of Brian Orser (silver) and Brian Boitano (bronze).

At the 1986 World Championships, Fadeev entered the long program with a comfortable lead and needed only a third place in the long program to defend his title. Five major mistakes, however, placed him fifth in the segment and third overall. He took the bronze medal behind Brian Boitano (gold) and Brian Orser (silver).

Receiving several 6.0s, Fadeev regained his European title in 1987. He repeated as the bronze medalist at the World Championships, finishing third again behind Orser and Boitano in Cincinnati.

In the 1987–88 season, Fadeev won his fourth national title and third European title. At the 1988 Winter Olympics in Calgary, he skated the best compulsory figures but his placements in the short (9th) and free programs (4th) dropped him out of the medals to fourth overall. He withdrew from the World Championships.

In 1988–89, Fadeev won the NHK Trophy and fifth Soviet national title. He scored four perfect 6.0s on the way to his fourth European title. At the 1989 World Championships, he led after the compulsory figures but dropped to fourth overall after poor placements in the short and free programs.

In the 1989–90 season, Fadeev took the silver medal at the 1989 NHK Trophy, second to Petrenko but ahead of reigning World champion Kurt Browning. He defeated Viktor Petrenko to win the 1990 Soviet national title, but did not appear again in amateur competition.

Fadeev was a cast member of the 1998 movie The Christmas Angel: A Story on Ice, as well as the Gershwin on Ice theatre show with Tiffany Chin. He currently works as a coach in the Chicago area.

== Results ==
International
Event	1978–79	1979–80	1980–81	1981–82	1982–83	1983–84	1984–85	1985–86	1986–87	1987–88	1988–89	1989–90
Olympics						7th				4th		
Worlds		14th		10th	4th	3rd	1st	3rd	3rd	WD	4th	
Europeans			9th	5th	3rd	1st		3rd	1st	1st	1st	
NHK Trophy		9th			2nd		1st		WD		1st	2nd
Moscow News			5th		1st	3rd	1st	1st		1st	3rd	
International: Junior
Junior Worlds	3rd	1st										
National
Soviet Champ.		4th	2nd	3rd	1st			1st	1st	1st	1st	1st
WD = Withdrew

Note: At the 1988 World Championships, Fadeev was in 1st place after the compulsory figures before withdrawing from the competition before the short program.
