= Anna Levandi =

Russian former competitive figure skater (born 1965)

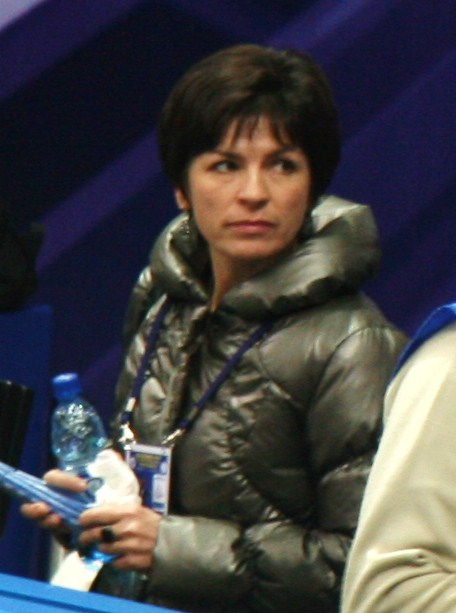
- Levandi in 2010

Personal information
- Full name: Anna Anatolevna Levandi
- Other names: Anna Kondrashova
- Born: 30 June 1965 (age 61) Moscow, Russian SFSR, Soviet Union
- Height: 1.63 m (5 ft 4 in)

Figure skating career
- Country: Soviet Union
- Skating club: CSKA Moscow
- Retired: 1988 (competitive)
Medal record
Representing the Soviet Union
Ladies' Figure skating
World Championships
Silver medal – second place	1984 Ottawa	Ladies' singles
European Championships
Bronze medal – third place	1984 Budapest	Ladies' singles
Bronze medal – third place	1986 Copenhagen	Ladies' singles
Bronze medal – third place	1987 Sarajevo	Ladies' singles
Bronze medal – third place	1988 Prague	Ladies' singles

Anna Levandi, (Note: Russian: Анна Анатольевна Леванди) née Kondrashova, (Note: Russian: Кондрашова) (born 30 June 1965) is an Estonian former competitive figure skater and politician. Levandi, who is of Russian origin who represented the former Soviet Union in international competition. She was the 1984 World silver medalist and four-time European bronze medalist. She competed at two Winter Olympic Games.

Since 2024, Levandi, who is a member of the conservative Isamaa party, has been serving as district elder of Tallinn's Haabersti district.

== Early life ==
Levandi was born Anna Anatolevna Kondrashova, (Note: In her maiden name that follows Eastern Slavic naming conventions, the patronymic is Anatolevna and the family name was Kondrashova) and grew up in Moscow, Russia (then Soviet Union). She began skating at age 6 at Moscow's Central Army Sports Club, where she was trained by Eduoard Pliner.

== Competitive career ==
Levandi started competing at senior ISU events in 1983. At her second European Championships in 1984, she won the bronze medal, and she represented the Soviet Union at the 1984 Winter Olympics, where she placed 5th. She won the silver medal at the 1984 World Figure Skating Championships after performing a free program with three triple jumps. Her marks were considered high by the crowd, which booed.

She changed coaches to Stanislav Zhuk in 1984, but in 1986 she and Marina Zoueva sent a letter of complaint about his abusive behavior to the Central Committee of the Communist Party of the Soviet Union, and he was made to retire. After Zhuk, she trained with Stanislav Leonovich.

Kondrashova was fifth at the 1985 European championships, but she won three more bronze medals at the European championships from 1986 through 1988, for a total of four. She once again represented the Soviet Union at the 1988 Winter Olympics, where she placed 8th. She retired from competitive skating following that season

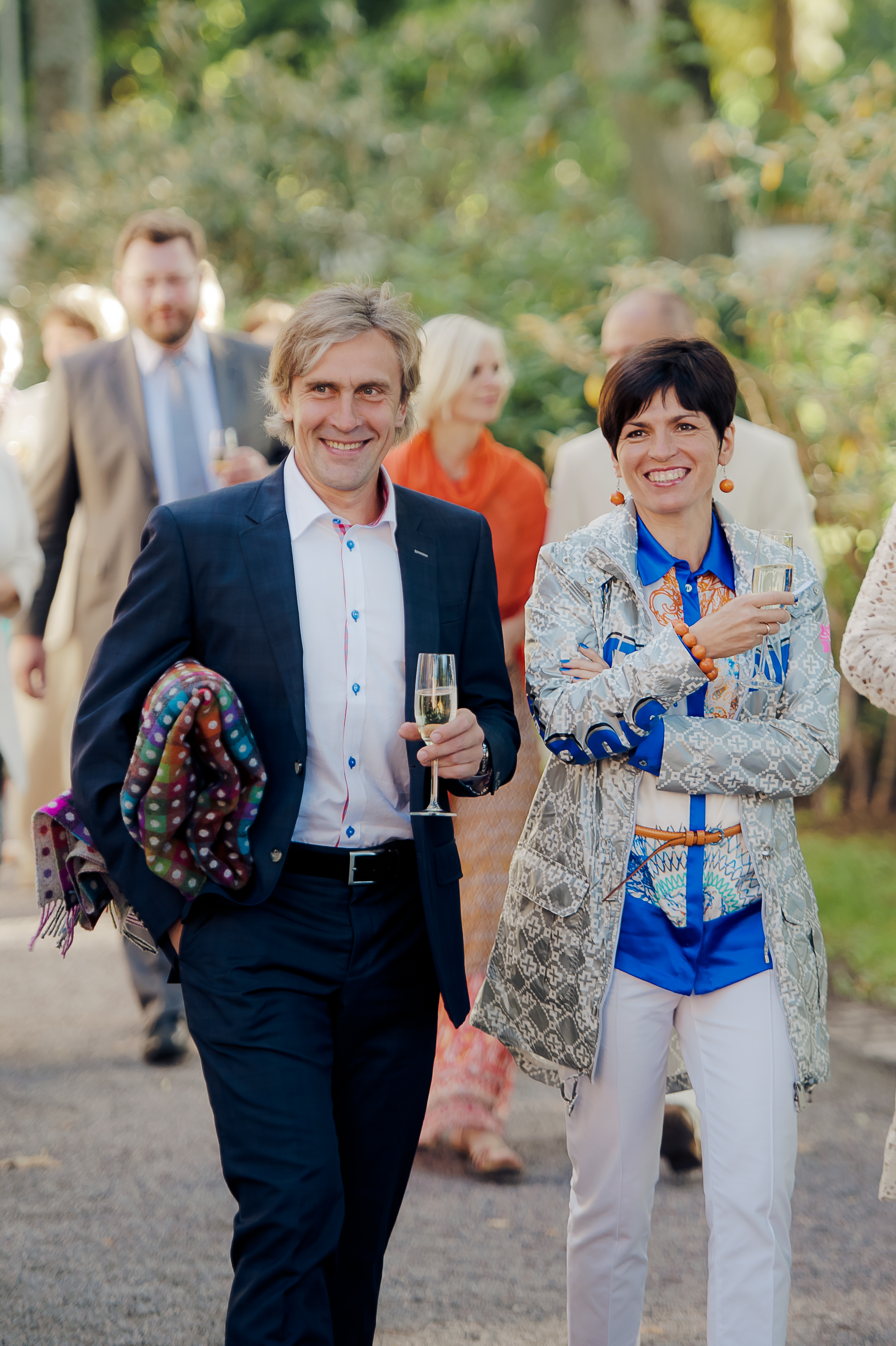
Allar Levandi and Anna Levandi in 2012

== Figure skating results ==
International
Event	81–82	82–83	83–84	84–85	85–86	86–87	87–88
Winter Olympics			5th				8th
World Championships		5th	2nd	4th	7th	9th	
European Championships		5th	3rd	5th	3rd	3rd	3rd
Prize of Moscow News		2nd	2nd	3rd	2nd	3rd	
National
Soviet Championships	3rd	2nd		1st	1st	1st	

== Coaching career ==
Levandi works as a coach and choreographer at Anna Levandi Figure Skating Club in Tallinn. Among her current and former students and choreography clients are Johanna Allik, Jasmine Alexandra Costa, Alisa Drei, Jelena Glebova, Mari Hirvonen, Christian Horvath Svetlana Issakova, Taru Karvosenoja, Viktor Romanenkov, Viktoria Shklover & Valdis Mintals, Dmitri Tchumak, Arlet Levandi, Eva-Lotta Kiibus, and Vladislav Churakov.

On February 21, 2024, it was reported that the Estonian Anti-Doping and Sports Ethics Foundation had received allegations of abuse, such as derisive language and directing skaters to ignore injuries, from multiple former students of Levandi's. Levandi said that she was a demanding coach but denied that her behavior was abusive.

== Political career ==
Levandi joined the conservative Isamaa party in 2001.

Since 2024, she has been serving as district elder of Tallinn's Haabersti district.

== Personal life ==
Levandi is married to Allar Levandi, an Estonian former Olympic Nordic combined skier she met at the 1988 Winter Olympics. The couple lives in Estonia. Their son, Arlet Levandi, is a figure skater who competes for Estonia.

== Honors and awards ==
In 2007, she was named Woman of the Year of Estonia and in 2008 Coach of the Year of Estonia. On 4 February 2009, she was decorated with the Third Class Order of the White Star.
