= International Challenge Cup =

International figure skating competition

- Status: Active
- Genre: International competition
- Frequency: Annual
- Venue: IJssportcentrum Tilburg
- Location: Tilburg
- Country: Netherlands
- Inaugurated: 1976
- Organizer: Royal Dutch Skating Federation

The International Challenge Cup is an annual figure skating competition, organized by the Royal Dutch Skating Federation (Dutch: Koninklijke Nederlandsche Schaatsenrijders Bond) and held at the IJssportcentrum Tilburg in Tilburg, Netherlands. Originally known as the Ennia Challenge Cup, the first installment was held in Heerenveen in 1976 and featured only an event for women. The following year, the competition relocated to The Hague, and in addition to the men's, women's, and ice dance events, it featured a team award. The competition in 1984 was the last for many years. It returned in 2007, and since 2017, the Dutch Figure Skating Championships have been contested as part of the International Challenge Cup; the top Dutch competitors are then recognized as the Dutch national champions.

Medals are awarded in men's singles, women's singles, pair skating, and ice dance at the senior and junior levels, although each discipline may not necessarily be held every year due to a lack of participants. Brian Joubert of France holds the record for winning the most titles in men's singles (with two), while four skaters are tied for winning the most titles in women's singles (also with two each): Rika Kihira of Japan, Carolina Kostner of Italy, Kaori Sakamoto of Japan, and Katarina Witt of East Germany. Three teams are tied for winning the most titles in pair skating (with two each): Sara Conti and Niccolò Macii of Italy, Larisa Selezneva and Oleg Makarov of the Soviet Union, and Irina Vorobieva and Igor Lisovsky of the Soviet Union. Loïcia Demougeot and Théo le Mercier of France hold the record in ice dance (with three).

== History ==
Originally known as the Ennia Challenge Cup, the first installment of this competition was held in November 1976 at the Thialf in Heerenveen. It was sponsored by the Heerenveen Figure Skating Club and the Ennia insurance company, and was a competition only for women. Eleven women representing Australia, Italy, Sweden, Switzerland, and West Germany, as well as the Netherlands, competed. Jel Geldof, secretary of the Heerenveen Figure Skating Club, explained that Ennia wanted to sponsor the competition in order to give figure skating more prominence in the Netherlands. However, as planning began late, it was not included on the calendar of the International Skating Union (ISU), and it was too late for many nations, especially those in the Eastern Bloc, to schedule their skaters. Though the competition was considered a success, Ennia made certain demands in exchange for their continued sponsorship: the competition in 1977 had to be expanded to include the men's and pairs' events, had to be placed on the official ISU calendar and scheduled such that it did not conflict with the Richmond Trophy in Great Britain, and had to attract top-tier skaters, including those from Eastern Europe.

In 1977, the Ennia Challenge Cup was relocated to The Hague. Herman van Laer, chairman of the Royal Dutch Skating Federation, cited Dianne de Leeuw as the source of inspiration for a resurgence of interest in skating in the Netherlands, and hoped to capitalize on that. In addition to events in men's singles, women's singles, and ice dance, a special event was staged on the last day of the Ennia Challenge Cup, where team members from the different disciplines competed together to accumulate points based on their performances.

Due to a request from the ISU, the Ennia Challenge Cup omitted compulsory figures and compulsory dances from the competition beginning in 1978. The ISU explained that the omission was a trial experiment to help guide future decision-making. Compulsory figures were eventually discontinued internationally after the 1990 World Figure Skating Championships. At the 1978 competition, Denise Biellmann of Switzerland, winner of the women's event, had her name given to a new strain of tulip, and a bouquet of her namesake tulips was presented to her by Queen Juliana of the Netherlands.

In 1983, Ennia announced a merger with AGO to form Aegon; the competition was renamed the Aegon Challenge Cup. However, the 1984 event was the last for several years. The competition – now called the International Challenge Cup – returned in 2007, and instead of being held in the fall, it was now held in the spring. It also featured events for junior-level skaters, but did not include the team event. Since 2017, the Dutch Figure Skating Championships have been held in conjunction with the International Challenge Cup, and the top Dutch competitors are recognized as the Dutch national champions. In 2023, the competition was relocated to Tilburg.

== Senior medalists ==
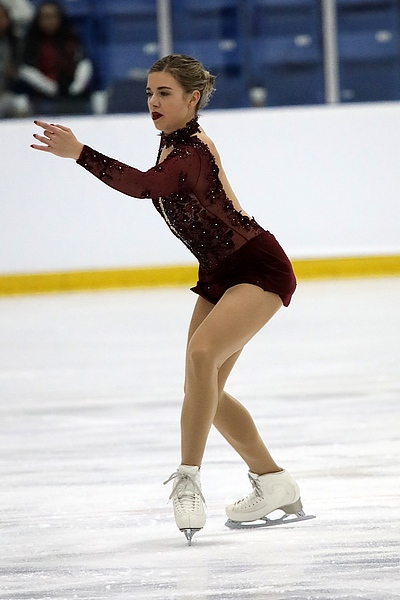
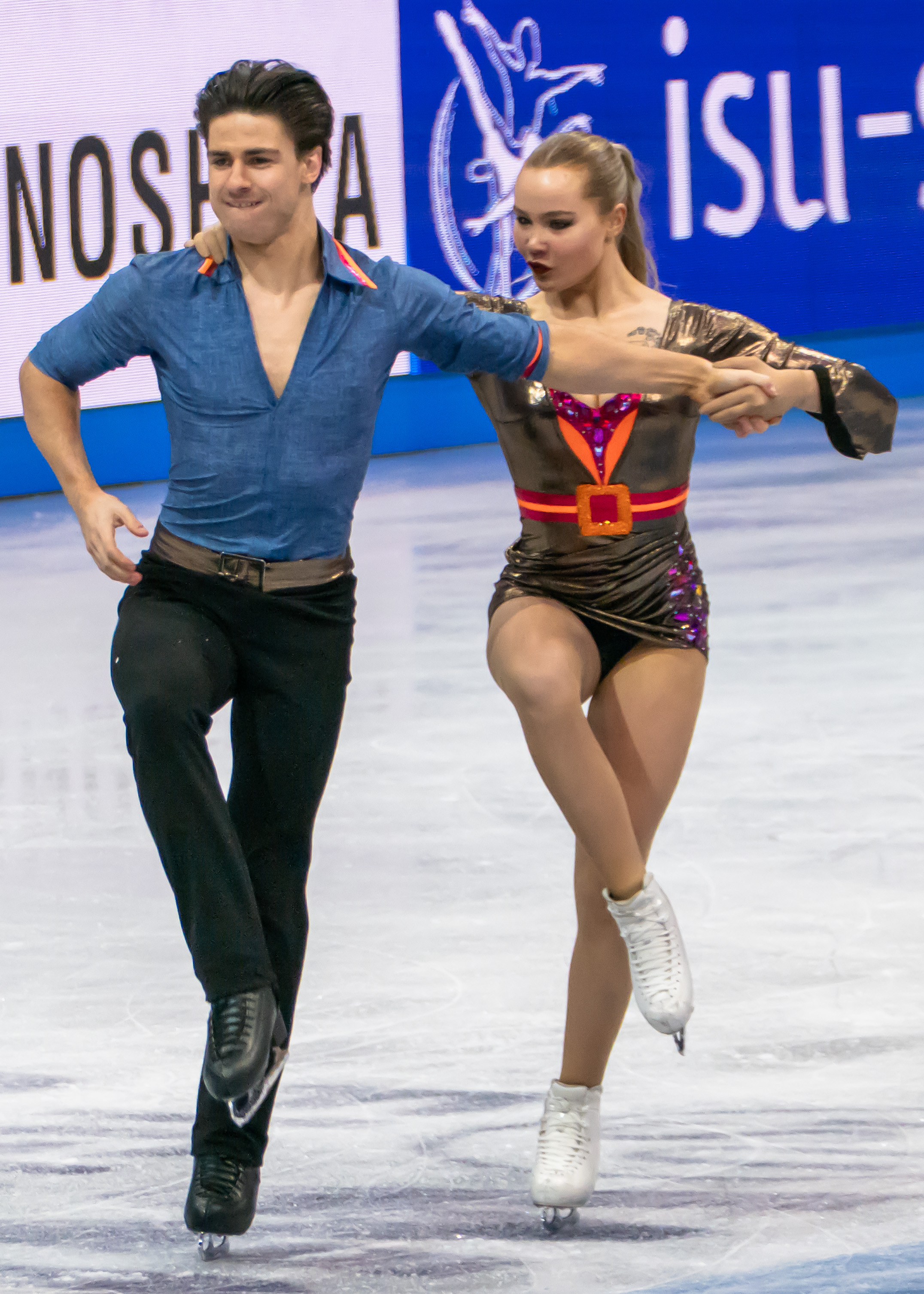
The 2026 International Challenge Cup champions: Niki Wories of the Netherlands (women's singles), and Loïcia Demougeot and Théo le Mercier of France (ice dance)

=== Men's singles ===
Senior men's event medalists
Year	Location	Gold	Silver	Bronze	Ref.
1976	Heerenveen	No senior men's competition			
1977	The Hague	(United States) David Santee	(Japan) Fumio Igarashi	(Canada) Daniel Béland	
1978	The Hague	(United States) Scott Cramer	(France) Jean-Christophe Simond	(Canada) Dennis Coi	
1979	The Hague	(United Kingdom) Robin Cousins	(Canada) Gordon Forbes	(United States) Robert Wagenhoffer	
1980	The Hague	(France) Jean-Christophe Simond	(United States) Mark Cockerell	(Canada) Daniel Béland	
1981	The Hague	(West Germany) Rudi Cerne	(United States) James Santee	(Canada) Dennis Coi	
1982	The Hague	(United States) Brian Boitano	(Czechoslovakia) Jozef Sabovčík	(East Germany) Falko Kirsten	
1983	The Hague	(Canada) Brian Orser	(Japan) Takashi Mura	(West Germany) Rudi Cerne	
1984	The Hague	(Czechoslovakia) Petr Barna	(Soviet Union) Viktor Petrenko	(United States) Christopher Bowman	
2007	The Hague	No senior men's competitors			
2008	The Hague	(Sweden) Kristoffer Berntsson	(Italy) Samuel Contesti	(Germany) Clemens Brummer	
2009	The Hague	(Italy) Samuel Contesti	(Belgium) Kevin van der Perren	(Switzerland) Jamal Othman	
2010–11	The Hague	No competitions held			
2012	The Hague	(France) Brian Joubert	(United States) Jeremy Abbott	(Italy) Samuel Contesti	
2013	The Hague	(France) Brian Joubert	(United States) Alexander Johnson	(France) Chafik Besseghier	
2014	The Hague	(Japan) Takahito Mura	(United States) Douglas Razzano	(France) Chafik Besseghier	
2015	The Hague	(Italy) Ivan Righini	(Spain) Javier Raya	(Japan) Ryuju Hino	
2016	The Hague	No competition held			
2017	The Hague	(Belgium) Jorik Hendrickx	(United States) Jordan Moeller	(Georgia (country)) Morisi Kvitelashvili	
2018	The Hague	(France) Adrien Tesson	(Italy) Daniel Grassl	(Finland) Valtter Virtanen	
2019	The Hague	(Japan) Sōta Yamamoto	(Japan) Yuma Kagiyama	(Switzerland) Lukas Britschgi	
2020	The Hague	(Japan) Shoma Uno	(Japan) Keiji Tanaka	(France) Adrien Tesson	
2021	The Hague	(Russia) Mikhail Kolyada	(France) Romain Ponsart	(France) Adam Siao Him Fa	
2022	The Hague	(United States) Ilia Malinin	(Estonia) Mihhail Selevko	(Japan) Sōta Yamamoto	
2023	Tilburg	(Japan) Shun Sato	(Japan) Sōta Yamamoto	(Italy) Matteo Rizzo	
2024	Tilburg	(Kazakhstan) Mikhail Shaidorov	(Japan) Tatsuya Tsuboi	(Japan) Kazuki Tomono	
2025	Tilburg	(Japan) Sena Miyake	(Mexico) Donovan Carrillo	(Israel) Mark Gorodnitsky	
2026	Tilburg	No senior men's competitors			

=== Women's singles ===
Senior women's event medalists
Year	Location	Gold	Silver	Bronze	Ref.
1976	Heerenveen	(Netherlands) Bibiana Pruyn	(Netherlands) Annemarie Verlaan	(Australia) Belinda Coulthard	
1977	The Hague	(Japan) Emi Watanabe	(Finland) Susan Broman	(Finland) Kristiina Wegelius	
1978	The Hague	(Switzerland) Denise Biellmann	(Czechoslovakia) Renata Baierová	(Soviet Union) Natalia Strelkova	
1979	The Hague	(Czechoslovakia) Renata Baierová	(United States) Elaine Zayak	(Canada) Heather Kemkaran	
1980	The Hague	(United States) Jackie Farrell	(East Germany) Katarina Witt	(Japan) Megumi Yanagihara	
1981	The Hague	(East Germany) Katarina Witt	(United States) Elaine Zayak	(Canada) Diane Ogibowski	
1982	The Hague	(United States) Vikki de Vries	(East Germany) Janina Wirth	(Canada) Charlene Wong	
1983	The Hague	(East Germany) Katarina Witt	(Japan) Midori Ito	(Japan) Sachie Yuki	
1984	The Hague	(East Germany) Constanze Gensel	(Japan) Yukari Yoshimori	(United States) Yvonne Gómez	
2007	The Hague	(Netherlands) Karen Venhuizen	(Austria) Kathrin Freudelsperger	(Switzerland) Viviane Käser	
2008	The Hague	(Japan) Akiko Suzuki	(Turkey) Tuğba Karademir	(United States) Becky Bereswill	
2009	The Hague	(Sweden) Viktoria Helgesson	(Sweden) Joshi Helgesson	(Germany) Constanze Paulinus	
2010–11	The Hague	No competitions held			
2012	The Hague	(Italy) Carolina Kostner	(Italy) Valentina Marchei	(United States) Alissa Czisny	
2013	The Hague	(Italy) Carolina Kostner	(France) Maé-Bérénice Méité	(Austria) Kerstin Frank	
2014	The Hague	(Sweden) Isabelle Olsson	(Japan) Haruka Imai	(Switzerland) Anna Ovcharova	
2015	The Hague	(Japan) Kanako Murakami	(Sweden) Joshi Helgesson	(Netherlands) Niki Wories	
2016	The Hague	No competition held			
2017	The Hague	(Belgium) Loena Hendrickx	(United States) Caroline Zhang	(Canada) Larkyn Austman	
2018	The Hague	(Japan) Wakaba Higuchi	(Japan) Rika Hongo	(Japan) Marin Honda	
2019	The Hague	(Japan) Rika Kihira	(United States) Starr Andrews	(Japan) Wakaba Higuchi	
2020	The Hague	(Japan) Rika Kihira	(Japan) Yuhana Yokoi	(Canada) Madeline Schizas	
2021	The Hague	(Belgium) Loena Hendrickx	(Chinese Taipei) Emmy Ma	(Cyprus) Emilea Zingas	
2022	The Hague	(Japan) Rino Matsuike	(United States) Lindsay Thorngren	(Hungary) Júlia Láng	
2023	Tilburg	(Japan) Kaori Sakamoto	(Japan) Mai Mihara	(Japan) Mana Kawabe	
2024	Tilburg	(Japan) Kaori Sakamoto	(Japan) Yuna Aoki	(France) Lorine Schild	
2025	Tilburg	(Japan) Rinka Watanabe	(Japan) Rion Sumiyoshi	(Japan) Mako Yamashita	
2026	Tilburg	(Netherlands) Niki Wories	(Germany) Sarah Marie Pesch	(Netherlands) Jolanda Vos	

=== Pairs ===
Senior pairs' event medalists
Year	Location	Gold	Silver	Bronze	Ref.
1976	Heerenveen	No senior pairs competitions			
1977	The Hague	No senior pairs competitions			
1978	The Hague	(Soviet Union); Irina Vorobieva; Igor Lisovsky	(United States); Sheryl Franks; Michael Botticelli	(Czechoslovakia); Ingrid Spieglová; Alan Spiegl	
1979	The Hague	(Soviet Union); Irina Vorobieva; Igor Lisovsky	(Soviet Union); Veronica Pershina; Marat Akbarov	(West Germany); Christina Riegel; Andreas Nischwitz	
1980	The Hague	(West Germany); Christina Riegel; Andreas Nischwitz	(United States); Kitty Carruthers; Peter Carruthers	(United Kingdom); Susan Garland; Robert Daw	
1981	The Hague	(Canada); Barbara Underhill; Paul Martini	(Soviet Union); Larisa Selezneva; Oleg Makarov	(United States); Vicki Heasley; Peter Oppegard	
1982	The Hague	(East Germany); Birgit Lorenz; Knut Schubert	(Soviet Union); Larisa Selezneva; Oleg Makarov	(United Kingdom); Susan Garland; Ian Jenkins	
1983	The Hague	(East Germany); Birgit Lorenz; Knut Schubert	(Canada); Cynthia Coull; Mark Rowsom	(Canada); Katherina Matousek; Lloyd Eisler	
1984	The Hague	(Soviet Union); Larisa Selezneva; Oleg Makarov	(Canada); Melinda Kunhegyi; Lyndon Johnston	(United States); Natalie Seybold; Wayne Seybold	
2007–12	The Hague	No senior pairs competitions			
2013	The Hague	(France); Vanessa James; Morgan Ciprès	(United States); Tarah Kayne; Daniel O'Shea	(Germany); Mari Vartmann; Aaron Van Cleave	
2014	The Hague	(France); Daria Popova; Bruno Massot	(Germany); Annabelle Prölß; Ruben Blommaert	(Italy); Giulia Foresti; Luca Demattè	
2015	The Hague	(United States); Gretchen Donlan; Nathan Bartholomay	(United Kingdom); Caitlin Yankowskas; Hamish Gaman	(Germany); Minerva Hase; Nolan Seegert	
2016	The Hague	No competition held			
2017	The Hague	(Hungary); Daria Beklemishcheva; Márk Magyar	(Finland); Emilia Simonen; Matthew Penasse	No other competitors	
2018	The Hague	(Spain); Laura Barquero; Aritz Maestu	(Switzerland); Ioulia Chtchetinina; Mikhail Akulov	(Italy); Rebecca Ghilardi; Filippo Ambrosini	
2019	The Hague	(Germany); Minerva Hase; Nolan Seegert	(Austria); Miriam Ziegler; Severin Kiefer	(Germany); Annika Hocke; Ruben Blommaert	
2020	The Hague	(Austria); Miriam Ziegler; Severin Kiefer	(United States); Audrey Lu; Misha Mitrofanov	(Italy); Rebecca Ghilardi; Filippo Ambrosini	
2021	The Hague	(Russia); Evgenia Tarasova; Vladimir Morozov	(Germany); Annika Hocke; Robert Kunkel	(Hungary); Ioulia Chtchetinina; Márk Magyar	
2022	The Hague	(Russia); Karina Akopova; Nikita Rakhmanin	(Netherlands); Daria Danilova; Michel Tsiba	(Netherlands); Nika Osipova; Dmitry Epstein	
2023	Tilburg	(Italy); Sara Conti; Niccolò Macii	(Hungary); Mária Pavlova; Alexei Sviatchenko	(Netherlands); Nika Osipova; Dmitry Epstein	
2024	Tilburg	(Italy); Sara Conti; Niccolò Macii	(Italy); Lucrezia Beccari; Matteo Guarise	(France); Camille Kovalev; Pavel Kovalev	
2025	Tilburg	(Georgia (country)); Anastasiia Metelkina; Luka Berulava	(Netherlands); Daria Danilova; Michel Tsiba	(Poland); Ioulia Chtchetinina; Michał Woźniak	
2026	Tilburg	No senior pairs competitors			

=== Ice dance ===
Senior ice dance event medalists
Year	Location	Gold	Silver	Bronze	Ref.
1976	Heerenveen	No senior ice dance competition			
1977	The Hague	(Soviet Union); Elena Garanina; Igor Zavozin	(Soviet Union); Elena Skorochodwa; Aleksei Badajnov	(United States); Stacey Smith; John Summers	
1978	The Hague	(Czechoslovakia); Liliana Řeháková; Stanislav Drastich	(Soviet Union); Natalia Karamysheva; Rostislav Sinitsyn	(Austria); Susanne Handschmann; Peter Handschmann	
1979	The Hague	(Czechoslovakia); Liliana Řeháková; Stanislav Drastich	(Soviet Union); Elena Garanina; Igor Zavozin	(Austria); Susanne Handschmann; Peter Handschmann	
1980	The Hague	(Soviet Union); Natalia Bestemianova; Andrei Bukin	(Soviet Union); Natalia Karamysheva; Rostislav Sinitsyn	(United Kingdom); Wendy Sessions; Stephen Williams	
1981	The Hague	(United States); Carol Fox; Richard Dalley	(Czechoslovakia); Jana Beránková; Jan Barták	(Canada); Tracy Wilson; Robert McCall	
1982	The Hague	(United Kingdom); Karen Barber; Nicky Slater	(Soviet Union); Marina Klimova; Sergei Ponomarenko	(Canada); Karyn Garossino; Rodney Garossino	
1983	The Hague	(Soviet Union); Marina Klimova; Sergei Ponomarenko	(Soviet Union); Elena Batanova; Alexei Soloviev	(Canada); Tracy Wilson; Robert McCall	
1984	The Hague	(Soviet Union); Marina Klimova; Sergei Ponomarenko	(Soviet Union); Maya Usova; Alexander Zhulin	(Austria); Kathrin Beck; Christoff Beck	
2007–19	The Hague	No senior ice dance competitions			
2020	The Hague	(Netherlands); Chelsea Verhaegh; Sherim van Geffen	No other competitors		
2021	The Hague	(France); Evgeniia Lopareva; Geoffrey Brissaud	(Hungary); Anna Yanovskaya; Ádám Lukács	(Netherlands); Chelsea Verhaegh; Sherim van Geffen	
2022	The Hague	(France); Natacha Lagouge; Arnaud Caffa	(Finland); Yuka Orihara; Juho Pirinen	(Hungary); Mariia Ignateva; Danijil Szemko	
2023	Tilburg	(France); Evgenia Lopareva; Geoffrey Brissaud	(France); Loïcia Demougeot; Théo le Mercier	(Finland); Yuka Orihara; Juho Pirinen	
2024	Tilburg	(France); Loïcia Demougeot; Théo le Mercier	(Spain); Olivia Smart; Tim Dieck	(Canada); Alicia Fabbri; Paul Ayer	
2025	Tilburg	(France); Loïcia Demougeot; Théo le Mercier	(Finland); Yuka Orihara; Juho Pirinen	(France); Natacha Lagouge; Arnaud Caffa	
2026	Tilburg	(France); Loïcia Demougeot; Théo le Mercier	(France); Marie Dupayage; Thomas Nabais	(France); Célina Fradji; Jean-Hans Fourneaux	

=== Team event ===
Team event champions
Year	Location	Gold	Ref.
1977	The Hague	United States	
1978	The Hague	Czechoslovakia	
1979	The Hague	Czechoslovakia	
1980	The Hague	United States	
1981	The Hague	United States	
1982	The Hague	United States	
1983	The Hague	Canada	
1984	The Hague	Soviet Union	

== Junior medalists ==
=== Men's singles ===
Junior men's event medalists
Year	Location	Gold	Silver	Bronze	Ref.
2007	The Hague	No junior men's competitors			
2008	The Hague	(United States) Andrew Gonzales	(United States) Daniel O'Shea	(Japan) Yukihiro Yoshida	
2009	The Hague	(Japan) Daisuke Murakami	(United States) Joshua Farris	(Belgium) Jorik Hendrickx	
2010–11	The Hague	No competitions held			
2012	The Hague	(United Kingdom) Peter James Hallam	(Turkey) Osman Akgün	(United Kingdom) Charlie Parry-Evans	
2013	The Hague	No junior-level competition held			
2014	The Hague	(Japan) Sei Kawahara	(Japan) Kazuki Tomono	(Germany) Joti Polizoakis	
2015	The Hague	(United States) Tomoki Hiwatashi	(Finland) Juho Pirinen	(Spain) Héctor Alonso Serrano	
2016	The Hague	No competition held			
2017	The Hague	(Switzerland) Nurullah Sahaka	(Spain) Aleix Gabara Xanco	(Germany) Thomas Junski	
2018	The Hague	(Japan) Taichiro Yamakuma	(Japan) Yuto Kishina	(Germany) Kai Jagoda	
2019	The Hague	(Japan) Shun Sato	(Germany) Daniel Sapozhnikov	(Germany) Tim England	
2020	The Hague	(Japan) Nozomu Yoshioka	(Germany) Denis Gurdzhi	(United Kingdom) Edward Appleby	
2021	The Hague	No junior-level competition held			
2022	The Hague	(Japan) Shunsuke Nakamura	(Switzerland) Naoki Rossi	(United States) Taira Shinohara	
2023	Tilburg	(Japan) Haruya Sasaki	(Japan) Haru Kakiuchi	(Switzerland) Georgii Pavlov	
2024	Tilburg	(Sweden) Hugo Bostedt	(Germany) Robert Wildt	(Italy) Nikolay di Tria	
2025	Tilburg	(France) Gianni Motilla	(Austria) Tobia Oellerer	(United States) Lorenzo Elano	
2026	Tilburg	(Belgium) Denis Krouglov	(South Africa) Cody Kock	(Spain) André Zapata	

=== Women's results ===
Junior women's event medalists
Year	Location	Gold	Silver	Bronze	Ref.
2007	The Hague	(United States) Rachael Flatt	(United States) Alexe Gilles	(United States) Chrissy Hughes	
2008	The Hague	(United States) Brittney Rizo	(Japan) Shoko Ishikawa	(United States) Amanda Dobbs	
2009	The Hague	(Japan) Kanako Murakami	(United States) Ellie Kawamura	(Sweden) Isabelle Olsson	
2010–11	The Hague	No competitions held			
2012	The Hague	(United States) Leah Keiser	(Canada) Gabrielle Daleman	(Italy) Giada Russo	
2013	The Hague	No junior-level competition held			
2014	The Hague	(Japan) Kaori Sakamoto	(United States) Elena Taylor	(Finland) Emmi Peltonen	
2015	The Hague	(United States) Rebecca Peng	(Netherlands) Kyarha van Tiel	(Belgium) Loena Hendrickx	
2016	The Hague	No competition held			
2017	The Hague	(United States) Emmy Ma	(Canada) Olivia Gran	(Sweden) Smilla Szalkai	
2018	The Hague	(Japan) Nana Araki	(Japan) Yuhana Yokoi	(Austria) Stefanie Pesendorfer	
2019	The Hague	(Japan) Yuhana Yokoi	(Germany) Maria Aimeé Renne	(Finland) Selma Välitalo	
2020	The Hague	(Japan) Mone Chiba	(Italy) Ginevra Lavinia Negrello	(Japan) Shiika Yoshioka	
2021	The Hague	No junior-level competition held			
2022	The Hague	(Japan) Mone Chiba	(Japan) Ayumi Shibayama	(Italy) Anna Pezzetta	
2023	Tilburg	(Japan) Ayumi Shibayama	(Japan) Ikura Kushida	(Japan) Yurina Okuno	
2024	Tilburg	(Sweden) Alexandra Ödman	(Germany) Julia Grabowski	(Belgium) Danielle Verbinnen	
2025	Tilburg	(United States) Sherry Zhang	(United States) Angela Shao	(Netherlands) Lucca Dijkhuizen	
2026	Tilburg	(Belgium) Lilou Remeysen	(France) Stefania Gladki	(Germany) Anna Gerke	

=== Pairs ===
Junior pairs' event medalists
Year	Location	Gold	Silver	Bronze	Ref.
No junior pairs competitions prior to 2012
2012	The Hague	(United States); Jessica Pfund; A.J. Reiss	(Russia); Anastasia Dolidze; Vadim Ivanov	(Germany); Vanessa Bauer; Nolan Seegert	
2013	The Hague	No junior-level competition held			
2014	The Hague	(United States); Jessica Lee; Robert Hennings	(United States); Aya Takai; Brian Johnson	(Hong Kong); Marin Ono; Hon Lam To	
2015	The Hague	(Japan); Ami Koga; Francis Boudreau-Audet	(Ukraine); Renata Ohanesian; Mark Bardei	(United States); Gabriella Marvaldi; Cody Dolkiewicz	
2016	The Hague	No competition held			
2017–18	The Hague	No junior pairs competitions			
2019	The Hague	(Netherlands); Daria Danilova; Michel Tsiba	No other competitors		
2020–22	The Hague	No junior pairs competitions			
2023	Tilburg	(United States); Olivia Flores; Luke Wang	(Austria); Giorgia Ghedini; Luc Maierhofer	(Germany); Katalin Janne Salatzki; Lukas Röseler	
2024	Tilburg	(United Kingdom); Zarah Wood; Alex Lapsky	No other competitors		
2025	Tilburg	(France); Romane Télémaque; Lucas Coulon	(United States); Sofia Jarmoc; Luke Witkowski	(United States); Elizabeth Hansen; William Church	
2026	Tilburg	(United States); Reagan Moss; Jakub Galbavy	(Spain); Anita Mapelli; Noah Quesada Grau	(United States); Sofia Jarmoc; Luke Witkowski	

=== Ice dance ===
Junior ice dance event medalists
Year	Location	Gold	Silver	Bronze	Ref.
2007	The Hague	No junior ice dance competitors			
2008	The Hague	(United States); Kaylin Patitucci; Karl Edelman	(Poland); Justyna Plutowska; Dawid Pietrzyński	(Austria); Sonja Pauli; Tobias Eisenbauer	
2009–22	The Hague	No junior ice dance competitions			
2023	Tilburg	(France); Ambre Perrier-Gianesi; Samuel Blanc-Klaperman	(Belgium); Sofiia Beznosikova; Max Leleu	(Czech Republic); Eliška Žáková; Filip Mencl	
2024	Tilburg	(Italy); Beatrice Ventura; Stefano Fransca	(Italy); Vittoria Petracchi; Daniel Basile	(Finland); Enna Kesti; Oskari Liedenpohja	
2025	Tilburg	(France); Dania Mouaden; Théo Bigot	(Switzerland); Gina Zehnder; Beda Leon Sieber	(Austria); Anita Straub; Andreas Straub	
2026	Tilburg	(Italy); Zoe Bianchi; Daniel Basile	(United States); Jasmine Robertson; Chase Rohner	(France); Lea Hienne; Louis Varescon	

== Records ==
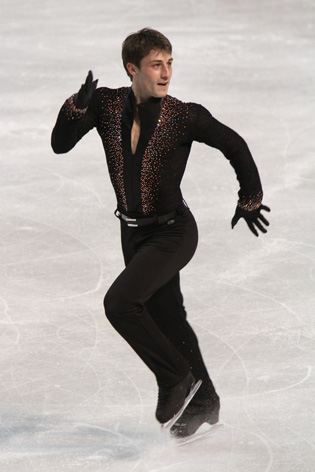
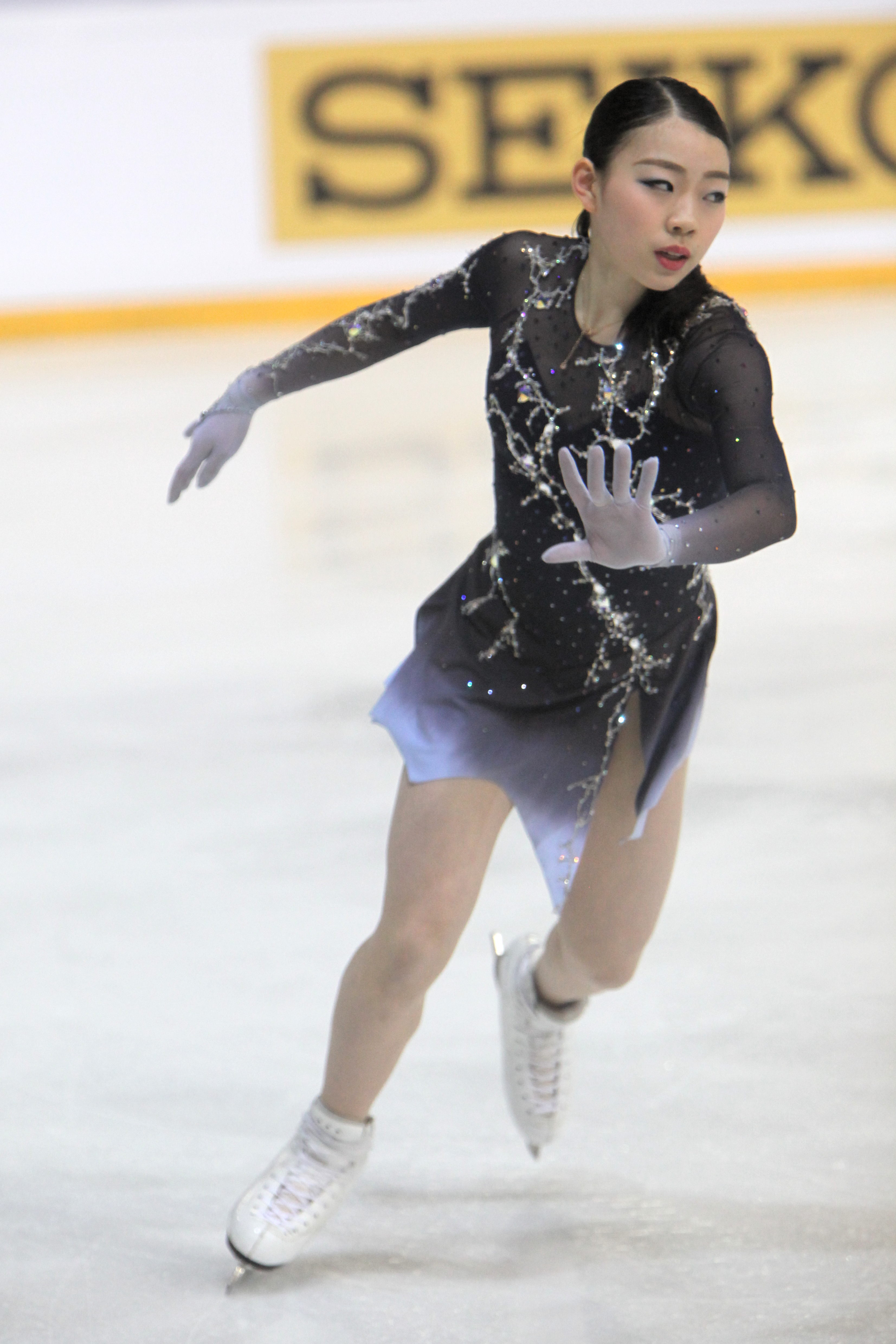
From left to right: Brian Joubert of France won two International Challenge Cup titles in men's singles, and Rika Kihira of Japan won two International Challenge Cup titles in women's singles.
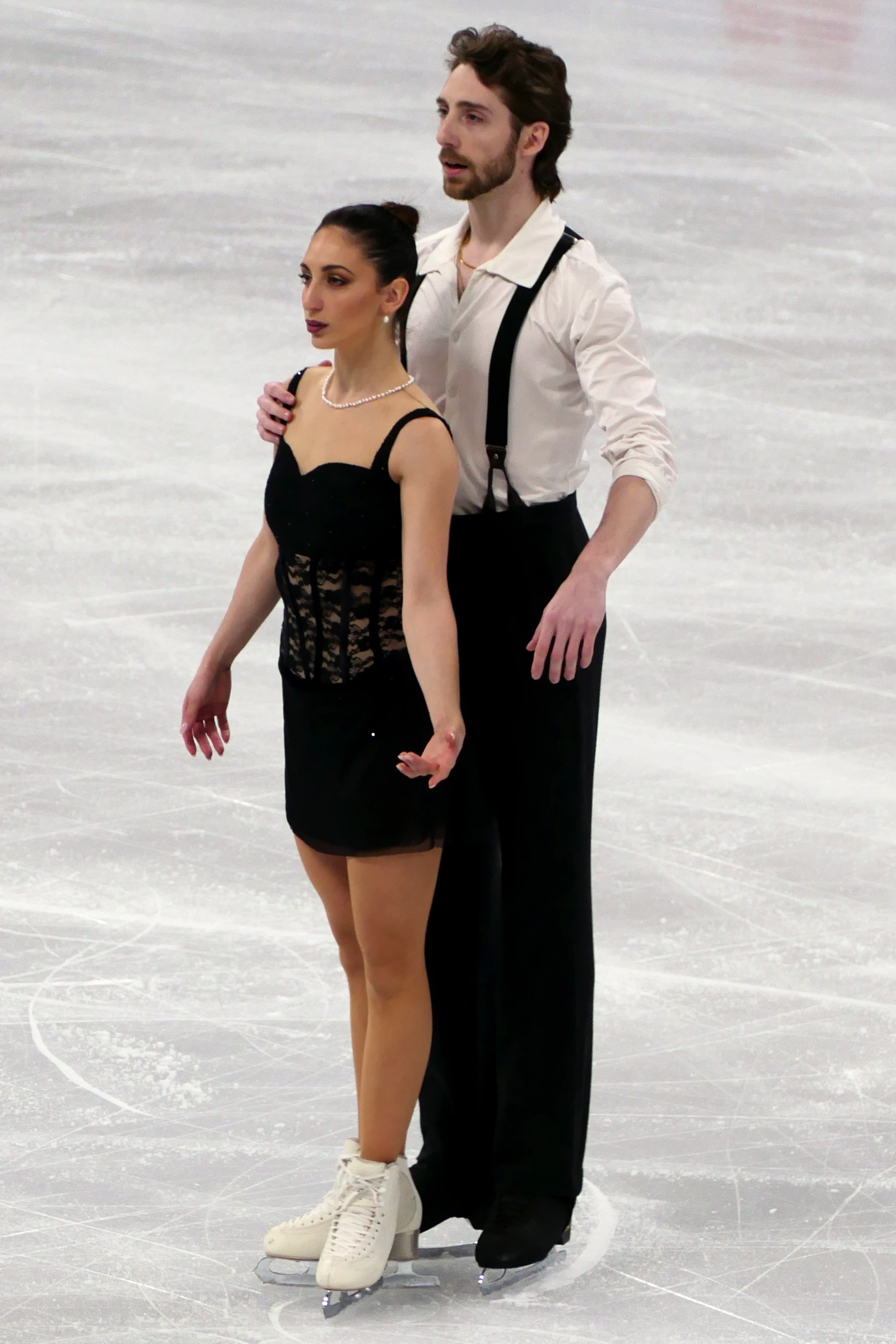
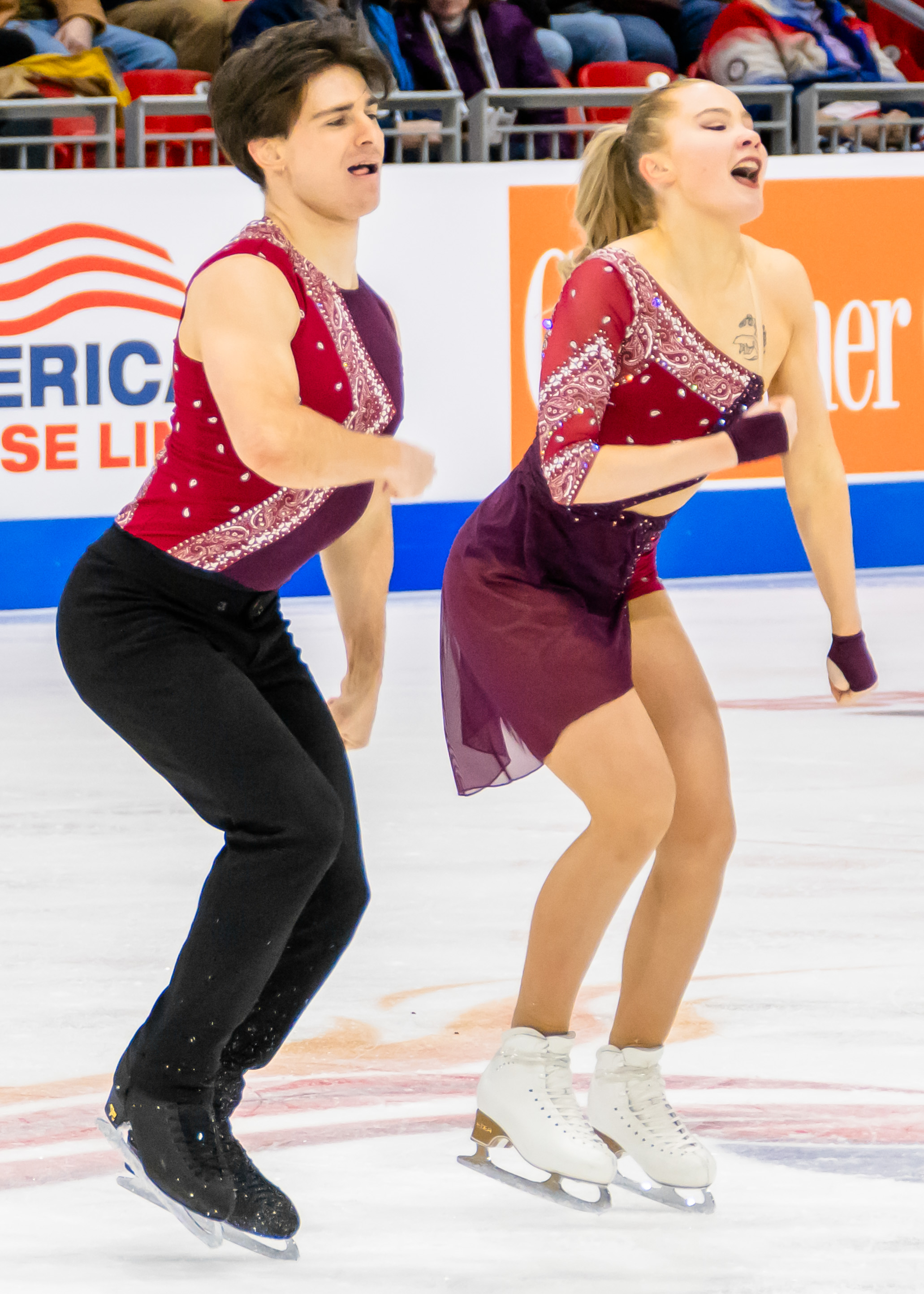
From left to right: Sara Conti and Niccolò Macii of Italy have won two International Challenge Cup titles in pair skating, and Loïcia Demougeot and Théo le Mercier of France have won three International Challenge Cup titles in ice dance.

Records
Discipline	Most titles			
Discipline	Skater(s)	No.	Years	Ref.
Men's singles	(France); Brian Joubert	2	2012–13	
Women's singles	(Japan); Rika Kihira	2	2019–20	
Women's singles	(Italy); Carolina Kostner	2	2012–13	
Women's singles	(Japan); Kaori Sakamoto	2	2023–24	
Women's singles	(East Germany); Katarina Witt	2	1981, 1983	
Pairs	(Italy); Sara Conti; Niccolò Macii	2	2023–24	
Pairs	(Soviet Union); Larisa Selezneva; Oleg Makarov	2	1982, 1984	
Pairs	(Soviet Union); Irina Vorobieva; Igor Lisovsky	2	1978–79	
Ice dance	(France); Loïcia Demougeot; Théo le Mercier	3	2024–26	

== Cumulative medal count (senior medalists) ==
=== Men's singles ===
Total number of International Challenge Cup medals in men's singles by nation
Rank	Nation	Gold	Silver	Bronze	Total
1	Japan	5	6	3	14
2	United States	4	6	2	12
3	France	4	2	4	10
4	Italy	2	2	2	6
5	Canada	1	1	4	6
6	Belgium	1	1	0	2
6	Czechoslovakia	1	1	0	2
8	West Germany	1	0	1	2
9	Great Britain	1	0	0	1
9	Kazakhstan	1	0	0	1
9	Russia	1	0	0	1
9	Sweden	1	0	0	1
13	Estonia	0	1	0	1
13	Mexico	0	1	0	1
13	Soviet Union	0	1	0	1
13	Spain	0	1	0	1
17	Switzerland	0	0	2	2
18	East Germany	0	0	1	1
18	Finland	0	0	1	1
18	Georgia	0	0	1	1
18	Germany	0	0	1	1
18	Israel	0	0	1	1
Totals (22 entries)		23	23	23	69

=== Women's singles ===
Total number of International Challenge Cup medals in women's singles by nation
Rank	Nation	Gold	Silver	Bronze	Total
1	Japan	10	8	6	24
2	East Germany	3	2	0	5
3	Netherlands	3	1	2	6
4	United States	2	5	3	10
5	Sweden	2	2	0	4
6	Italy	2	1	0	3
7	Belgium	2	0	0	2
8	Czechoslovakia	1	1	0	2
9	Switzerland	1	0	2	3
10	Austria	0	1	1	2
10	Finland	0	1	1	2
10	France	0	1	1	2
10	Germany	0	1	1	2
14	Chinese Taipei	0	1	0	1
14	Turkey	0	1	0	1
16	Canada	0	0	5	5
17	Australia	0	0	1	1
17	Cyprus	0	0	1	1
17	Hungary	0	0	1	1
17	Soviet Union	0	0	1	1
Totals (20 entries)		26	26	26	78

=== Pairs ===
Total number of International Challenge Cup medals in pairs by nation
Rank	Nation	Gold	Silver	Bronze	Total
1	Soviet Union	3	3	0	6
2	Italy	2	1	3	6
3	France	2	0	1	3
4	East Germany	2	0	0	2
4	Russia	2	0	0	2
6	United States	1	4	2	7
7	Germany	1	2	3	6
8	Canada	1	2	1	4
9	Hungary	1	1	1	3
10	Austria	1	1	0	2
11	West Germany	1	0	1	2
12	Georgia	1	0	0	1
12	Spain	1	0	0	1
14	Netherlands	0	2	2	4
15	Great Britain	0	1	2	3
16	Finland	0	1	0	1
16	Switzerland	0	1	0	1
18	Czechoslovakia	0	0	1	1
18	Poland	0	0	1	1
Totals (19 entries)		19	19	18	56

=== Ice dance ===
Total number of International Challenge Cup medals in ice dance by nation
Rank	Nation	Gold	Silver	Bronze	Total
1	France	6	2	2	10
2	Soviet Union	4	7	0	11
3	Czechoslovakia	2	1	0	3
4	Great Britain	1	0	1	2
4	Netherlands	1	0	1	2
4	United States	1	0	1	2
7	Finland	0	2	1	3
8	Hungary	0	1	1	2
9	Spain	0	1	0	1
10	Canada	0	0	4	4
11	Austria	0	0	3	3
Totals (11 entries)		15	14	14	43

=== Total medals ===
Total number of International Challenge Cup medals by nation
Rank	Nation	Gold	Silver	Bronze	Total
1	Japan	15	14	9	38
2	France	12	5	8	25
3	United States	8	15	8	31
4	Soviet Union	7	11	1	19
5	Italy	6	4	5	15
6	East Germany	5	2	1	8
7	Netherlands	4	3	5	12
8	Czechoslovakia	4	3	1	8
9	Sweden	3	2	0	5
10	Belgium	3	1	0	4
11	Russia	3	0	0	3
12	Canada	2	3	14	19
13	Great Britain	2	1	3	6
14	West Germany	2	0	2	4
15	Germany	1	3	5	9
16	Austria	1	2	4	7
17	Hungary	1	2	3	6
18	Spain	1	2	0	3
19	Switzerland	1	1	4	6
20	Georgia	1	0	1	2
21	Kazakhstan	1	0	0	1
22	Finland	0	4	3	7
23	Chinese Taipei	0	1	0	1
23	Estonia	0	1	0	1
23	Mexico	0	1	0	1
23	Turkey	0	1	0	1
27	Australia	0	0	1	1
27	Cyprus	0	0	1	1
27	Israel	0	0	1	1
27	Poland	0	0	1	1
Totals (30 entries)		83	82	81	246
