= Zavozin =

Zavozin (Russian: Завозин), Zavozina is a surname. Notable people with the surname include:

- Igor Zavozin (1955–2019), Soviet ice dancer
- Maxim Zavozin (born 1985), Russian ice dancer, son of Igor
