= 1990 Skate America =

- Season: 1990–91
- Location: Buffalo, New York
- Host: U.S. Figure Skating
- Venue: Buffalo Memorial Auditorium

Champions
- Men's singles: (Soviet Union) Viktor Petrenko
- Ladies' singles: (United States) Kristi Yamaguchi
- Pairs: (Soviet Union) Marina Eltsova / Andrei Bushkov
- Ice dance: (Italy) Stefania Calegari / Pasquale Camerlengo
- Previous: 1989 Skate America
- Next: 1991 Skate America

The 1990 Skate America was held at the Memorial Auditorium in Buffalo, New York. Medals were awarded in the disciplines of men's singles, ladies' singles, pair skating, and ice dancing.

== Results ==
=== Men ===
Rank	Name	Nation	OP	FP	TFP
1	Viktor Petrenko	Soviet Union	1	1	1.5
2	Christopher Bowman	United States	4	2	4.0
3	Todd Eldredge	United States	2	3	4.0
4	Viacheslav Zagorodniuk	Soviet Union	3	4	5.5
5	Craig Heath	United States	5	5	7.5
6	Philippe Candeloro	France	9	6	10.5
7	Patrick Brault	Canada	6	8	11.0
8	Elvis Stojko	Canada	7	10	13.5
9	Ralph Burghart	Austria	10	9	14.0
10	Jung Sung-il	South Korea	15	7	14.5
11	Alessandro Riccitelli	Italy	8	11	15.0
12	Steven Cousins	United Kingdom	12	12	18.0
13	Cameron Medhurst	Australia	14	13	20.0
14	Oliver Höner	Switzerland	13	14	20.5
15	Mitsuhiro Murata	Japan	11	15	20.5

=== Ladies ===
Rank	Name	Nation	OP	FP	TFP
1	Kristi Yamaguchi	United States	1	1	1.5
2	Midori Ito	Japan	2	2	3.0
3	Tonia Kwiatkowski	United States	3	3	4.5
4	Patricia Neske	Germany	4	4	6.0
5	Surya Bonaly	France	8	5	9.0
6	Jeri Campbell	United States	6	6	9.0
7	Olga Markova	Soviet Union	9	7	11.5
8	Karen Preston	Canada	7	8	11.5
9	Evelyn Großmann	Germany	5	9	11.5
10	Margot Bion	Canada	12	10	16.0
11	Carola Wolff	Germany	10	12	17.0
12	Suzanne Otterson	United Kingdom	13	11	17.5
13	Beatrice Gelmini	Italy	11	13	18.5
14	Diana Marcos	Mexico	14	14	21.0

=== Pairs ===
Rank	Name	Nation	TFP	OP	FP
1	Marina Eltsova / Andrei Bushkov	Soviet Union			
2	Radka Kovaříková / René Novotný	Czechoslovakia			
3	Mandy Wötzel / Axel Rauschenbach	Germany			
4	Natasha Kuchiki / Todd Sand	United States	5.5	3	4
5	Stacey Ball / Jean-Michel Bombardier	Canada			
6					
7	Calla Urbanski / Rocky Marval	United States			
8					
9	Patricia MacNeil / Cory Watson	Canada			
10	Angela Deneweth / John Denton	United States			

=== Ice dancing ===
Rank	Name	Nation	CD1	CD2	OD	FD	TFP
1	Stefania Calegari / Pasquale Camerlengo	Italy	1	1	1	1	2.0
2	Isabelle Sarech / Xavier Debernis	France	3	3	2	2	4.4
3	Illona Melnichenko / Gennadi Kaskov	Soviet Union	2	2	3	3	5.6
4	Ivana Střondalová / Milan Brzý	Czechoslovakia	4	4	4	4	8.0
5	Małgorzata Grajcar / Andrzej Dostatni	Poland	5	5	5	5	10.0
6	Jeanne Miley / Michael Verlich	United States	6	6	6	6	12.0
7	Regina Woodward / Csaba Szentpéteri	Hungary	8	7	7	7	14.2
8	Penny Mann / Juan Carlos Noria	Canada	9	9	8	8	16.4
9	Isabelle Labossiere / Mitchell Gould	Canada	7	8	9	9	17.4
10	Amy Webster / Leif Erickson	United States	10	10	10	10	20.0
11	Wendy Millette / J Curtis	United States	11	11	11	11	22.0

== Publications ==
- Patinage Magazine N°25 Déc.-Janv.-Feb. 1991, p.61
