= Martine Patenaude =

Canadian ice dancer

Personal information
- Born: September 28, 1974 (age 52) Montreal, Quebec, Canada

Figure skating career
- Country: Canada
- Skating club: CPA Centre Sud, Montreal
- Began skating: 1981
- Retired: 2005

Martine Patenaude (born September 28, 1974) is a Canadian former ice dancer. With partner Eric Massé, she won the bronze medal at the Canadian Figure Skating Championships in 1994. After retiring from skating for a decade, she returned to the ice with Pascal Denis. They won the silver medal at the 2004 Nebelhorn Trophy.

== Programs ==
(with Denis)

Season	Original dance	Free dance
2004–2005	Chicago soundtrack by J. Kander and F. Ebb (Charleston, Slow Foxtrot, Charleston)	Moulin Rouge!: Sparkling Diamonds; Tango de Roxane

== Results ==
GP: Grand Prix

=== With Denis ===
International
Event	2004–2005
Four Continents Championships	7th
GP Skate Canada International	8th
Nebelhorn Trophy	2nd
National
Canadian Championships	6th

=== With Massé ===
International
Event	89–90	90–91	91–92	92–93	93–94
Nebelhorn Trophy					1st
Skate Canada				8th	
St. Gervais					2nd
International: Junior
World Junior Champ.	5th	7th			
National
Canadian Champ.		3rd J		6th	3rd
J = Junior
