= Nebelhorn Trophy =

International figure skating competition

- Status: Active
- Genre: ISU Challenger Series
- Frequency: Annual
- Venue: Eissportzentrum Oberstdorf
- Location: Oberstdorf
- Country: West Germany (1969–90); Germany (since 1991)
- Inaugurated: 1969
- Previous event: 2026 Nebelhorn Trophy
- Next event: 2027 Nebelhorn Trophy
- Organizer: German Ice Skating Union

The Nebelhorn Trophy is an annual figure skating competition sanctioned by the International Skating Union (ISU), organized and hosted by the German Ice Skating Union (German: Deutsche Eislauf-Union) at the Eissportzentrum Oberstdorf in Oberstdorf, Germany. The competition debuted in 1969 and is named after the Nebelhorn, a nearby mountain. It has occasionally served as the final qualifying event for the Winter Olympics. When the ISU launched the ISU Challenger Series in 2014, the Nebelhorn Trophy was one of the inaugural competitions, and it has been a Challenger Series event every year since. Medals are awarded in men's singles, women's singles, pair skating, and ice dance; and as part of the Challenger Series, skaters earn points towards their World Standings and Season's World Rankings based on their results.

Nobunari Oda of Japan holds the record for winning the most Nebelhorn Trophy titles in men's singles (with three). Four skaters are tied for winning the most titles in women's singles (with two each): Alissa Czisny of the United States, Carolina Kostner of Italy, Kaetlyn Osmond of Canada, and Irina Slutskaya of Russia. Two teams are tied for winning the most titles in pair skating (with four each): Tatiana Volosozhar and Maxim Trankov of Russia, and Aljona Savchenko and Robin Szolkowy of Germany, although Savchenko has won an additional two titles with other partners. In addition, Minerva Fabienne Hase of Germany has won four Nebelhorn Trophy titles in pair skating, but with two different partners. Lilah Fear and Lewis Gibson of Great Britain hold the record in ice dance (with three).

== History ==
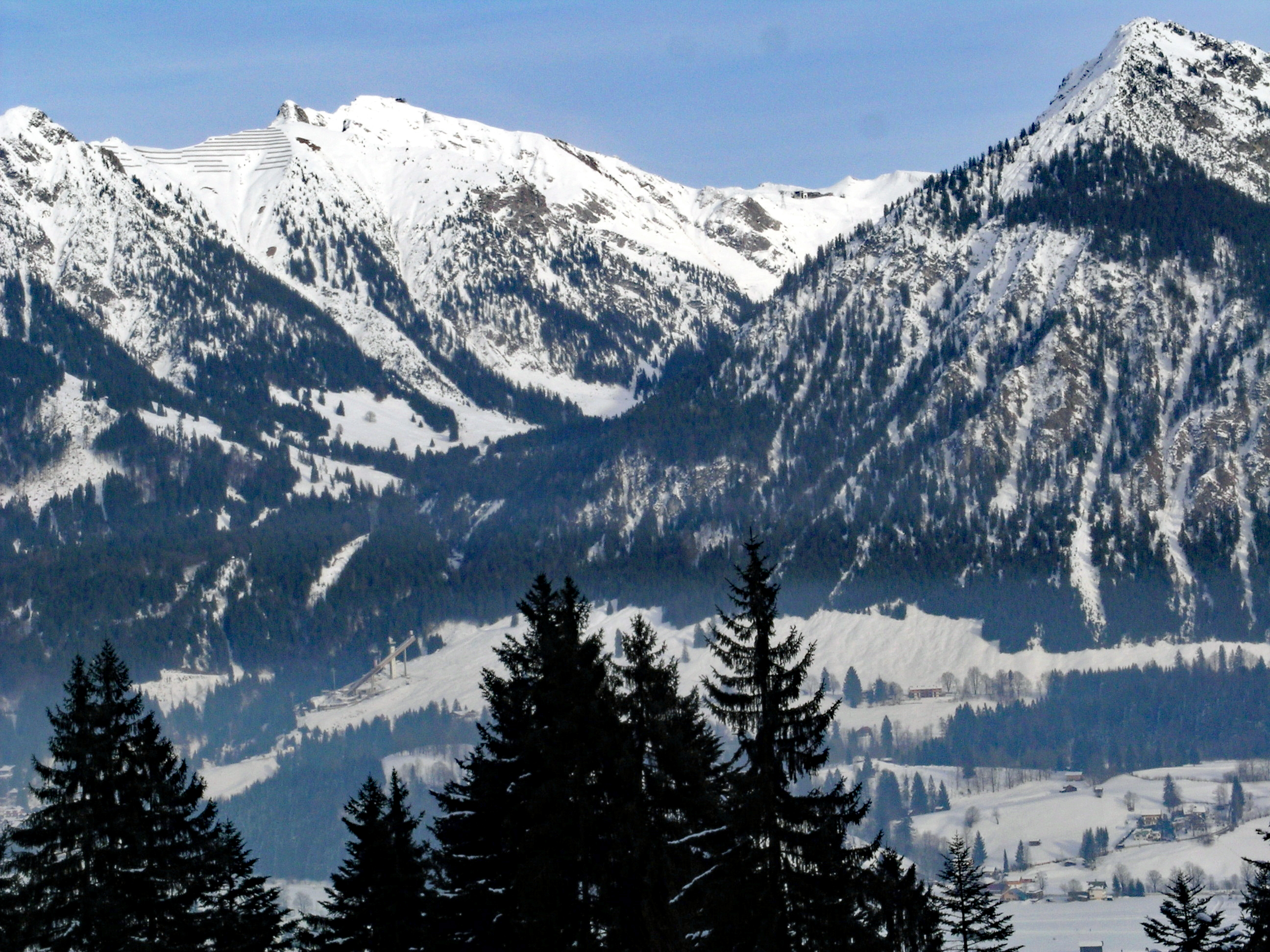
The Nebelhorn: the mountain near Oberstdorf for which the Nebelhorn Trophy was named

The Nebelhorn Trophy debuted in 1969 in Oberstdorf, in what was then West Germany, and is named after the nearby Nebelhorn mountain. Early on, it was paired with a now-defunct French event – the Grand Prix International St. Gervais – to form the Coupe des Alpes, with many of the same skaters participating in both events. A team trophy was occasionally presented to the country with the highest combined placements across both competitions.

The Nebelhorn Trophy has often been used by the International Skating Union to experiment with new judging and scoring systems for figure skating. In 1972, the ISU announced a new set of rules for single skating: skaters now had to perform three compulsory figures, a short program of compulsory moves, and the free skating program. The 1972 Nebelhorn Trophy was the first competition to feature these new requirements. The 1997 competition was used as the test event for a new system whereby each skater or team was ranked in comparison to the skaters or teams who had already competed. While the actual results at the 2002 Nebelhorn Trophy were still determined using the existing 6.0 system, the event was used to test the new ISU Judging System. This new system had been designed in reaction to the judging scandal at the 2002 Winter Olympics, where the French judge in the pairs event had been implicated in colluding to award the gold medals to the Russian team instead of the Canadian team. The 2003 Nebelhorn Trophy was the first international skating competition to use the ISU Judging System to determine the official results. The 2009 Nebelhorn Trophy served as the final qualifying event for the 2010 Winter Olympics, as did the 2013 Nebelhorn Trophy for the 2014 Olympics, and the 2021 Nebelhorn Trophy for the 2022 Olympics.

The ISU Challenger Series was introduced in 2014 as a series of international figure skating competitions, sanctioned by the International Skating Union and organized by ISU member nations. The objective is to ensure consistent organization and structure within a series of international competitions linked together, providing opportunities for senior-level skaters to compete at the international level and also earn points towards their ISU World Standings and Season's World Rankings. The Nebelhorn Trophy was one of the inaugural events. When an event is held as part of the Challenger Series, it must host at least three of the four disciplines (men's singles, women's singles, pair skating, and ice dance) and representatives from at least ten different ISU member nations. The minimum number of entrants required for each discipline is eight skaters each in men's singles and women's singles, five teams in pair skating, and six teams in ice dance. Each ISU member nation is eligible to enter up to three skaters or teams per discipline in each competition, although the German Ice Skating Union may enter an unlimited number of entrants in their own event.

In February 2016, the ISU declared that the Nebelhorn Trophy, along with the Ondrej Nepela Memorial, the Finlandia Trophy, and the Golden Spin of Zagreb, would constitute a core group of Challenger Series events in recognition of their long-standing traditions. The Nebelhorn Trophy has been a Challenger Series event every year since. Despite the COVID-19 pandemic, the 2020 Nebelhorn Trophy was held, but without spectators and with extensive social distancing guidelines and procedures for the athletes and coaches in attendance. In April 2026, the ISU announced that the Nebelhorn Trophy would again be included in a core group of Challenger Series events, along with the Golden Spin of Zagreb, the Nepela Memorial, and one competition from either Canada or the United States.

== Medalists ==
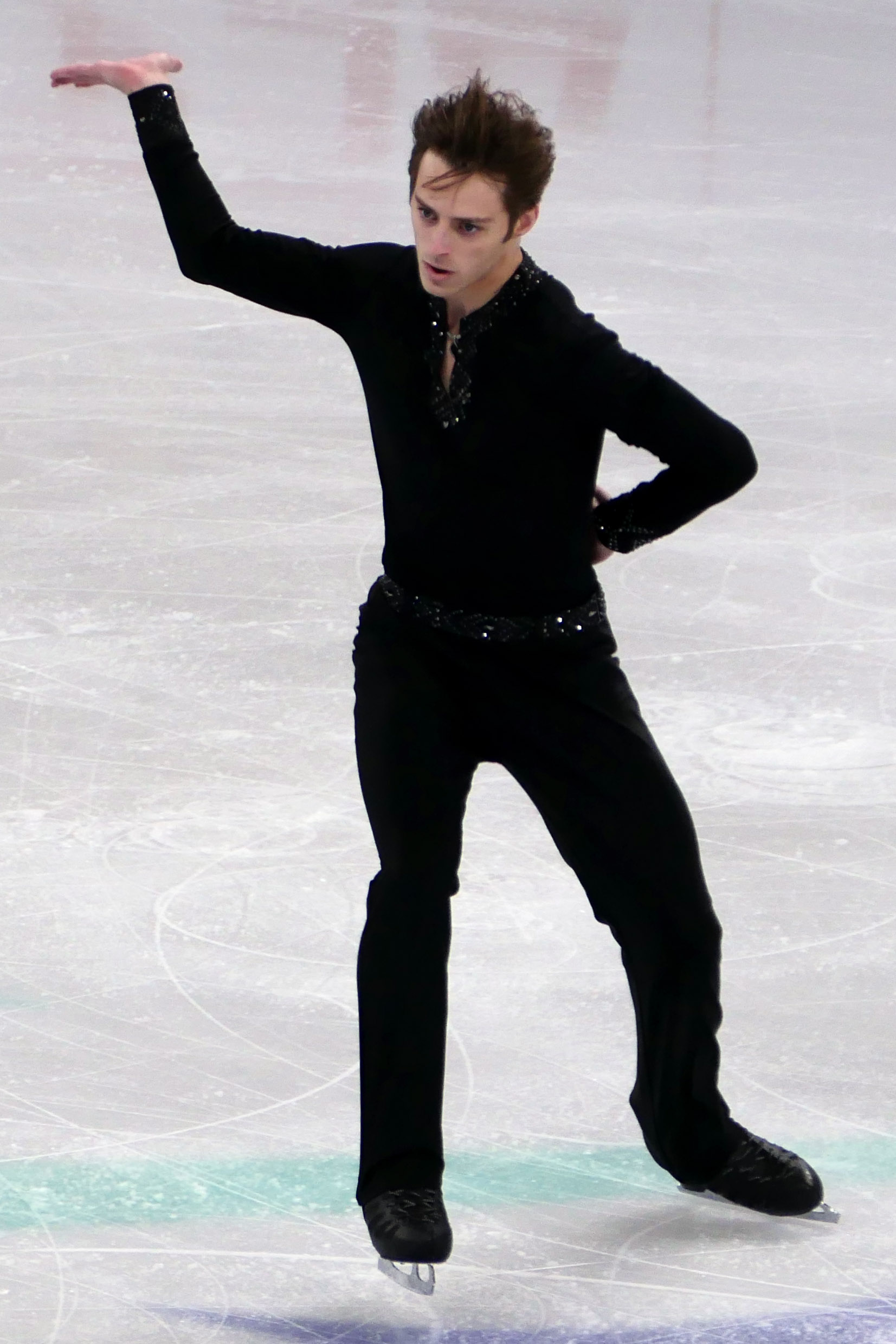
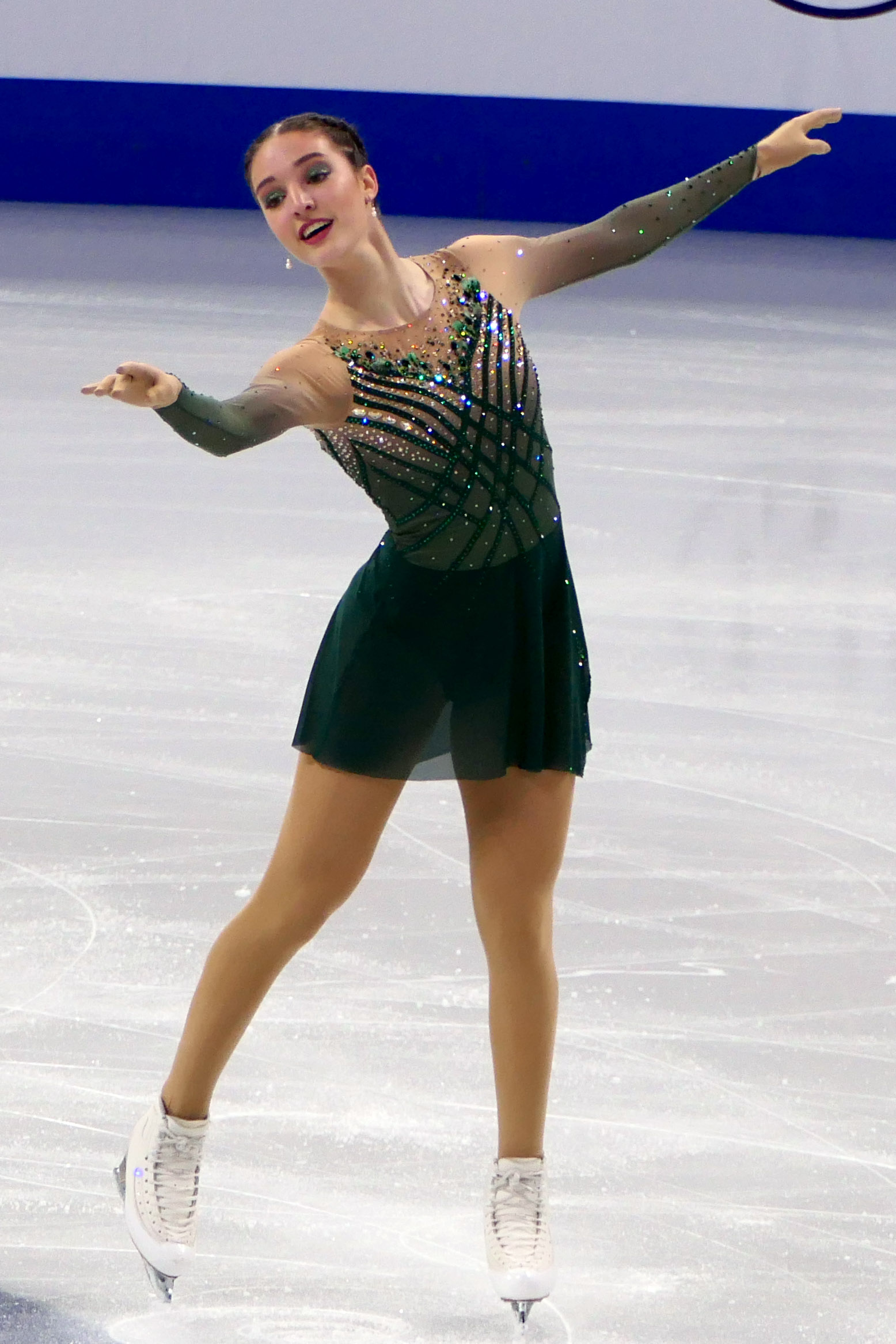
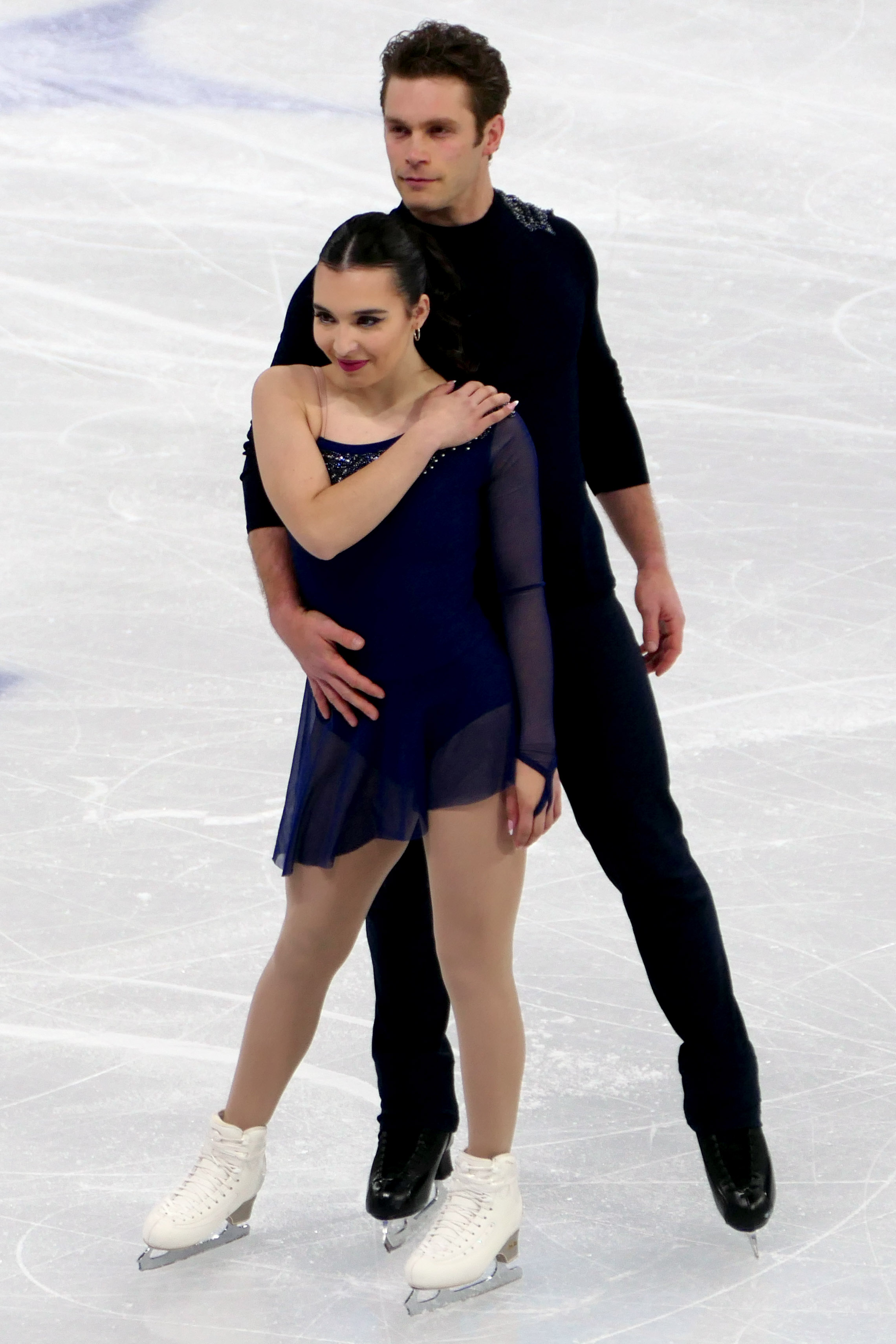
The 2026 Nebelhorn Trophy champions (from left to right): Aleksandr Selevko of Estonia (men's singles); Mia Risa Gomez of Norway (women's singles); Lia Pereira and Trennt Michaud of Canada (pair skating); and Christina Carreira and Anthony Ponomarenko of the United States (ice dance)

CS: Challenger Series event

=== Men's singles ===
Men's event medalists
Year	Gold	Silver	Bronze	Ref.
1969	(Austria) Günter Anderl	(West Germany) Reinhard Ketterer	(West Germany) Klaus Grimmelt	
1970	(West Germany) Klaus Grimmelt	(United Kingdom) John Curry	(United Kingdom) Michael Fish	
1971	(West Germany) Erich Reifschneider	(Romania) Gheorghe Fazekas	(Netherlands) Rob Ouwerkerk	
1972	(United States) Robert Bradshaw	(United States) Terry Kubicka	(West Germany) Erich Reifschneider	
1973	(United States) John Carlow Jr.	(United States) Charles Tickner	(Luxembourg) Paul Cechmanek	
1974	(United States) David Santee	(Canada) Kevin Robertson	(Luxembourg) Paul Cechmanek	
1975	(Canada) Ted Barton	(United States) Ken Newfield	(West Germany) Harald Kuhn	
1976	(Japan) Fumio Igarashi	(United States) Scott Hamilton	(West Germany) Rudi Cerne	
1977	(United States) Robert Wagenhoffer	(West Germany) Kurt Kurzinger	(West Germany) Gerd-Walter Gräbner	
1978	(United States) Allen Schramm	(United States) Mark Cockerell	(Canada) Gary Beacom	
1979	(Canada) Gordon Forbes	(Soviet Union) Vladimir Rashchetnov	(United States) Brian Boitano	
1980	(United States) Tom Dickson	(Canada) Brian Orser	(West Germany) Rudi Cerne	
1981	(West Germany) Heiko Fischer	(United States) John Filbig	(Canada) Kevin Hicks	
1982	(West Germany) Leonardo Azzola	(Italy) Bruno Delmaestro	(United States) James Cygan	
1983	(West Germany) Heiko Fischer	(West Germany) Richard Zander	(Canada) André Bourgeois	
1984	(West Germany) Richard Zander	(United States) Craig Henderson	(Soviet Union) Leonid Kaznakov	
1985	(West Germany) Richard Zander	(United States) Doug Mattis	(France) Laurent Depouilly	
1986	(Soviet Union) Vitali Egorov	(United States) Erik Larson	(Canada) Kurt Browning	
1987	(United States) Todd Eldredge	(United States) Patrick Brault	(Denmark) Lars Dresler	
1988	(United States) Aren Nielsen	(Canada) Marcus Christensen	(United States) Christopher Mitchell	
1989	(United States) Shepherd Clark	(West Germany) Richard Zander	(Soviet Union) Gleb Bokiy	
1990	(United States) Michael Chack	(France) Nicolas Pétorin	(Soviet Union) Vladimir Petrenko	
1991	(United States) Ryan Hunka	(Russia) Igor Pashkevich	(Canada) Brent Frank	
1992	(Chinese Taipei) David Liu	(Russia) Igor Pashkevich	(France) Axel Médéric	
1993	(Canada) Jeffrey Langdon	(United States) Michael Weiss	(Canada) Jean-François Hébert	
1994	(Russia) Ilia Kulik	(United States) Shepherd Clark	(Russia) Alexander Abt	
1995	(Japan) Takeshi Honda	(Ukraine) Evgeni Pliuta	(Japan) Yosuke Takeuchi	
1996	(United States) Michael Weiss	(Japan) Yamato Tamura	(Russia) Igor Sinyutin	
1997	(United States) Timothy Goebel	(Ukraine) Evgeni Pliuta	(Russia) Alexander Abt	
1998	(United States) Trifun Zivanovic	(Ukraine) Yevgeny Martynov	(Ukraine) Vitaliy Danylchenko	
1999	(Russia) Ilia Klimkin	(Ukraine) Vitaliy Danylchenko	(Canada) Jayson Dénommée	
2000	(Russia) Anton Klykov	(United States) Derrick Delmore	(Ukraine) Dmytro Dmytrenko	
2001	(Belarus) Sergei Davydov	(Canada) Jeffrey Buttle	(Estonia) Margus Hernits	
2002	(Belarus) Sergei Davydov	(United States) Benjamin Miller	(Canada) Fedor Andreev	
2003	(Canada) Nicholas Young	(United States) Scott Smith	(United States) Nicholas LaRoche	
2004	(Canada) Marc-André Craig	(Russia) Alexander Kondakov	(United States) Christopher Toland	
2005	(Germany) Stefan Lindemann	(Japan) Noriyuki Kanzaki	(Czech Republic) Tomáš Verner	
2006	(Czech Republic) Tomáš Verner	(United States) Parker Pennington	(Canada) Vaughn Chipeur	
2007	(Czech Republic) Michal Březina	(United States) Shaun Rogers	(Czech Republic) Tomáš Verner	
2008	(Japan) Nobunari Oda	(Czech Republic) Michal Březina	(France) Yannick Ponsero	
2009	(Switzerland) Stéphane Lambiel	(Russia) Ivan Tretiakov	(Czech Republic) Michal Březina	
2010	(Japan) Tatsuki Machida	(Russia) Konstantin Menshov	(Germany) Peter Liebers	
2011	(Japan) Yuzuru Hanyu	(Czech Republic) Michal Březina	(United States) Stephen Carriere	
2012	(Japan) Nobunari Oda	(Russia) Konstantin Menshov	(United States) Keegan Messing	
2013	(Japan) Nobunari Oda	(United States) Jason Brown	(Canada) Jeremy Ten	
2014 CS	(United States) Jason Brown	(Czech Republic) Michal Březina	(Russia) Konstantin Menshov	
2015 CS	(Canada) Elladj Baldé	(United States) Max Aaron	(Russia) Konstantin Menshov	
2016 CS	(Russia) Alexander Petrov	(Belgium) Jorik Hendrickx	(United States) Grant Hochstein	
2017 CS	(Belgium) Jorik Hendrickx	(United States) Alexander Johnson	(Sweden) Alexander Majorov	
2018 CS	(Canada) Keegan Messing	(Sweden) Alexander Majorov	(Russia) Artur Dmitriev	
2019 CS	(Russia) Makar Ignatov	(Japan) Koshiro Shimada	(Israel) Alexei Bychenko	
2020 CS	(Latvia) Deniss Vasiljevs	(Italy) Gabriele Frangipani	(Sweden) Nikolaj Majorov	
2021 CS	(United States) Vincent Zhou	(France) Adam Siao Him Fa	(Russia) Mark Kondratiuk	
2022 CS	(Canada) Keegan Messing	(South Korea) Lee Si-hyeong	(Canada) Roman Sadovsky	
2023 CS	(France) Adam Siao Him Fa	(Japan) Kazuki Tomono	(Japan) Koshiro Shimada	
2024 CS	(Japan) Sōta Yamamoto	(Italy) Gabriele Frangipani	(Latvia) Deniss Vasiļjevs	
2025 CS	(Canada) Stephen Gogolev	(United States) Andrew Torgashev	(Switzerland) Lukas Britschgi	
2026 CS	(Estonia) Aleksandr Selevko	(Germany) Genrikh Gartung	(France) François Pitot	

=== Women's singles ===
Women's event medalists
Year	Gold	Silver	Bronze	Ref.
1969	(Czechoslovakia) Ľudmila Bezáková	(United Kingdom) Rita Pokorski	(West Germany) Carmen Buchwald	
1970	(United Kingdom) Rita Pokorski	(West Germany) Angelika Kräger	(Switzerland) Karin Iten	
1971	(United States) Dorothy Hamill	(West Germany) Gerti Schanderl	(West Germany) Angelika Kräger	
1972	(United States) Wendy Burge	(West Germany) Isabel de Navarre	(United States) Patricia Shelley	
1973	(United States) Kath Malmberg	(United States) Linda Fratianne	(West Germany) Gerti Schanderl	
1974	(United States) Priscilla Hill	(United States) Barbara Smith	(West Germany) Petra Wagner	
1975	(United States) Lisa-Marie Allen	(West Germany) Petra Wagner	(West Germany) Dagmar Lurz	
1976	(West Germany) Garnet Ostermeier	(United States) Carrie Rugh	(Canada) Deborah Albright	
1977	(Japan) Reiko Kobayashi	(United States) Sandy Lenz	(West Germany) Karin Riediger	
1978	(United States) Editha Dotson	(West Germany) Corinna Tanski	(Canada) Janet Morrissey	
1979	(United States) Lynn Smith	(United States) Jackie Farrell	(West Germany) Karin Riediger	
1980	(United States) Vikki de Vries	(United Kingdom) Alison Southwood	(Canada) Elizabeth Manley	
1981	(West Germany) Cornelia Tesch	(United States) Kristy Hogan	(United States) Stephanie Anderson	
1982	(West Germany) Manuela Ruben	(United States) Kelley Webster	(Soviet Union) Natalia Ovchinnikova	
1983	(United States) Staci McMullin	(Canada) Barbara Butler	(Italy) Karin Telser	
1984	(United States) Debi Thomas	(Japan) Juri Ozawa	(United States) Sara MacInnes	
1985	(West Germany) Cornelia Tesch	(United States) Tracey Damigella	(United Kingdom) Joanne Conway	
1986	(United States) Holly Cook	(West Germany) Cornelia Renner	(Switzerland) Claudia Villiger	
1987	(Canada) Shannon Allison	(West Germany) Carola Wolff	(Canada) Lindsay Fedosoff	
1988	(United States) Tonia Kwiatkowski	(Canada) Josée Chouinard	(West Germany) Patricia Neske	
1989	(United States) Kyoko Ina	(France) Surya Bonaly	(Japan) Junko Yaginuma	
1990	(France) Surya Bonaly	(West Germany) Marina Kielmann	(Soviet Union) Maria Butyrskaya	
1991	(Japan) Kumiko Koiwai	(France) Marie-Pierre Leray	(Soviet Union) Nadeza Kowalewskaja	
1992	(Germany) Simone Lang	(Japan) Kumiko Koiwai	(Canada) Angela Derochie	
1993	(Russia) Irina Slutskaya	(Canada) Susan Humphreys	(Ukraine) Lyudmyla Ivanova	
1994	(Russia) Irina Slutskaya	(Japan) Shizuka Arakawa	(United States) Jennifer Karl	
1995	(Japan) Shizuka Arakawa	(Czech Republic) Lenka Kulovaná	(Russia) Elena Ivanova	
1996	(Germany) Eva-Maria Fitze	(United States) Sydne Vogel	(United States) Karen Kwan	
1997	(Ukraine) Elena Liashenko	(Russia) Olga Markova	(Russia) Nadezhda Kanaeva	
1998	(United States) Brittney McConn	(Russia) Elena Ivanova	(Czech Republic) Veronika Dytrtová	
1999	(Ukraine) Elena Liashenko	(Finland) Sanna-Maija Wiksten	(Finland) Elina Kettunen	
2000	(Ukraine) Galina Maniachenko	(Switzerland) Sarah Meier	(United States) Andrea Gardiner	
2001	(Russia) Ludmila Nelidina	(United States) Ann Patrice McDonough	(Russia) Kristina Oblasova	
2002	(Italy) Carolina Kostner	(Finland) Alisa Drei	(Russia) Ludmila Nelidina	
2003	(United States) Jennifer Don	(Canada) Lesley Hawker	(Russia) Olga Naidenova	
2004	(United States) Louann Donovan	(Finland) Alisa Drei	(Canada) Mira Leung	
2005	(Russia) Elena Sokolova	(Finland) Alisa Drei	(United States) Beatrisa Liang	
2006	(United States) Beatrisa Liang	(Russia) Arina Martinova	(United States) Katy Taylor	
2007	(Italy) Carolina Kostner	(United States) Megan Williams Stewart	(Finland) Laura Lepistö	
2008	(United States) Alissa Czisny	(Finland) Laura Lepistö	(Japan) Akiko Suzuki	
2009	(United States) Alissa Czisny	(Finland) Kiira Korpi	(China) Liu Yan	
2010	(Finland) Kiira Korpi	(Sweden) Viktoria Helgesson	(United States) Melissa Bulanhagui	
2011	(United States) Mirai Nagasu	(Georgia (country)) Elene Gedevanishvili	(Sweden) Joshi Helgesson	
2012	(Canada) Kaetlyn Osmond	(Russia) Adelina Sotnikova	(Japan) Haruka Imai	
2013	(Russia) Elena Radionova	(Japan) Miki Ando	(United States) Ashley Cain	
2014 CS	(Russia) Elizaveta Tuktamysheva	(Russia) Alena Leonova	(United States) Gracie Gold	
2015 CS	(Canada) Kaetlyn Osmond	(Russia) Alena Leonova	(United States) Courtney Hicks	
2016 CS	(Japan) Mai Mihara	(Russia) Elizaveta Tuktamysheva	(Canada) Gabrielle Daleman	
2017 CS	(Australia) Kailani Craine	(Sweden) Matilda Algotsson	(Switzerland) Alexia Paganini	
2018 CS	(Russia) Alina Zagitova	(Japan) Mai Mihara	(Belgium) Loena Hendrickx	
2019 CS	(United States) Mariah Bell	(South Korea) Kim Ye-lim	(Germany) Nicole Schott	
2020 CS	(Estonia) Eva-Lotta Kiibus	(Switzerland) Alexia Paganini	(Finland) Jenni Saarinen	
2021 CS	(United States) Alysa Liu	(Poland) Ekaterina Kurakova	(Belarus) Viktoriia Safonova	
2022 CS	(Belgium) Loena Hendrickx	(South Korea) Wi Seo-yeong	(Estonia) Eva-Lotta Kiibus	
2023 CS	(United States) Isabeau Levito	(Switzerland) Kimmy Repond	(South Korea) Kim Min-chae	
2024 CS	(United States) Elyce Lin-Gracey	(United States) Isabeau Levito	(Japan) Hana Yoshida	
2025 CS	(United States) Amber Glenn	(Japan) Mone Chiba	(South Korea) Shin Ji-a	
2026 CS	(Norway) Mia Risa Gomez	(Italy) Marina Piredda	(Canada) Fée Ann Landry	

=== Pairs ===
Pairs event medalists
Year	Gold	Silver	Bronze	Ref.
1969	(West Germany); Frigge Drzymalla; Michael Weingart	No other competitors		
1970	(West Germany); Almut Lehmann; Herbert Wiesinger	(United Kingdom); Jayne Torvill; Michael Hutchinson	No other competitors	
1971	No pairs competitors			
1972	(United States); Cozette Cady; Jack Courtney	(United States); Gale Fuhrman; Jack Fuhrman	(West Germany); Corinna Halke; Eberhard Rausch	
1973	(United States); Tai Babilonia; Randy Gardner	(West Germany); Corinna Halke; Eberhard Rausch	(Austria); Ursula Nemec; Michael Nemec	
1974	(Canada); Kathy Hutchinson; Jamie McGregor	(Canada); Candace Jones; Don Fraser	(Austria); Ulrike Webik; Richard Scharf	
1975	(Canada); Cheri Pinner; Dennis Pinner	(United States); Alice Cook; William Fauver	(Canada); Karen Newton; Glenn Laframboise	
1976	(West Germany); Susanne Scheibe; Andreas Nischwitz	(West Germany); Rafaela Dondoni; Mario Dondoni	(Japan); Natsuko Hagiwara; Sumio Murata	
1977	(United States); Gail Hamula; Frank Sweiding	(United States); Sheryl Franks; Michael Botticelli	(Germany); Susanne Scheibe; Andreas Nischwitz	
1978	(Canada); Barbara Underhill; Paul Martini	(United States); Maria di Domenico; Larry Schrier	(United States); Tracy Prussack; Scott Prussack	
1979	(United States); Caitlin Carruthers; Peter Carruthers	(Soviet Union); Channa Iljina; Aleksandr Vlasov	(Canada); Rebecca Gough; Mark Rowsom	
1980	(United Kingdom); Susan Garland; Robert Daw	(Canada); Mary Jo Fedy; Timothy Mills	(United States); Dana Graham; Paul Wylie	
1981	(Soviet Union); Elena Valova; Oleg Vasiliev	(Canada); Melinda Kunhegyi; Lyndon Johnston	(France); Nathalie Tortel; Xavier Videau	
1982	(Soviet Union); Inna Volyanskaya; Valery Spiridonov	(Canada); Katherina Matousek; Lloyd Eisler	(United States); Natalie Seybold; Wayne Seybold	
1983	(Soviet Union); Inna Bekker; Serguei Likhanski	(United States); Katy Keeley; Gary Kemp	(Canada); Laurene Collin; David Howe	
1984	(Soviet Union); Elena Bechke; Valeri Kornienko	(United States); Susan Dungjen; Jason Dungjen	(United States); Margo Shoup; Patrick Page	
1985	(Soviet Union); Lyudmila Koblova; Andrei Kalitin	(United States); Maria Lako; Michael Blicharski	(United Kingdom); Lisa Cushley; Neil Cushley	
1986	(Canada); Melanie Gaylor; Lee Barkell	(United States); Ashley Stevenson; Scott Wendland	(United Kingdom); Lisa Cushley; Neil Cushley	
1987	(Canada); Michelle Menzies; Kevin Wheeler	(Soviet Union); Elena Kvitchenko; Rashid Kadyrkaev	(Canada); Twana Rose; Colin Epp	
1988	(Canada); Cindy Landry; Lyndon Johnston	(Soviet Union); Ekaterina Murugova; Artem Torgashev	(United States); Kenna Bailey; John Denton	
1989	(Soviet Union); Elena Leonova; Gennadi Krasnitski	(Soviet Union); Evgenia Shishkova; Vadim Naumov	(Czechoslovakia); Radka Kovaříková; René Novotný	
1990	(Canada); Stacey Ball; Jean-Michel Bombardier	(Soviet Union); Natalia Krestianinova; Alexei Torchinski	(Canada); Penny Papaioannou; Raoul LeBlanc	
1991	(Canada); Stacey Ball; Kris Wirtz	(Soviet Union); Svitlana Prystav; Viacheslav Tkachenko	(Canada); Jamie Salé; Jason Turner	
1992	(Russia); Svetlana Titkova; Oleg Makhutov	(Canada); Tiina Muur; Cory Watson	(Canada); Jodeyne Higgins; Sean Rice	
1993	(Canada); Caroline Haddad; Jean-Sébastien Fecteau	(Latvia); Elena Berezhnaya; Oļegs Šļahovs	(United States); Stephanie Stiegler; Lance Travis	
1994	(Canada); Marie-Claude Savard-Gagnon; Luc Bradet	(France); Line Haddad; Sylvain Privé	(France); Sarah Abitbol; Stéphane Bernadis	
1995	(United States); Shelby Lyons; Brian Wells	(Ukraine); Olena Bilousivska; Serhiy Potalov	(Kazakhstan); Marina Khalturina; Andrei Krukov	
1996	(United States); Danielle Hartsell; Steve Hartsell	(Russia); Olga Semkina; Andrei Chuvilaev	(Canada); Samanta Marchant; Chad Hawse	
1997	(Ukraine); Evgenia Filonenko; Igor Marchenko	(Ukraine); Olena Bilousivska; Stanislav Morozov	(United States); Natalie Vlandis; Jered Guzman	
1998	(United States); Laura Handy; Paul Binnebose	(Canada); Jacinthe Larivière; Lenny Faustino	(Russia); Milica Brozović; Anton Nimenko	
1999	(Ukraine); Aljona Savchenko; Stanislav Morozov	(Canada); Jacinthe Larivière; Lenny Faustino	(Ukraine); Julia Obertas; Dmytro Palamarchuk	
2000	(Canada); Valérie Marcoux; Bruno Marcotte	(United States); Amanda Magarian; Jered Guzman	(United States); Stephanie Kalesavich; Aaron Parchem	
2001	(Canada); Jacinthe Larivière; Lenny Faustino	(Canada); Valérie Saurette; Jean-Sébastien Fecteau	(United States); Laura Handy; Jonathon Hunt	
2002	(Canada); Valérie Marcoux; Craig Buntin	(Russia); Julia Obertas; Alexei Sokolov	(United States); Kathryn Orscher; Garrett Lucash	
2003	(Canada); Utako Wakamatsu; Jean-Sébastien Fecteau	(Canada); Pascale Bergeron; Robert Davison	(United States); Laura Handy; Jeremy Allen	
2004	(United States); Marcy Hinzmann; Aaron Parchem	(Canada); Pascale Bergeron; Robert Davison	(Germany); Aljona Savchenko; Robin Szolkowy	
2005	(Germany); Aljona Savchenko; Robin Szolkowy	(Canada); Meagan Duhamel; Ryan Arnold	(United States); Marcy Hinzmann; Aaron Parchem	
2006	(United States); Brooke Castile; Benjamin Okolski	(United States); Julia Vlassov; Drew Meekins	(Sweden); Angelika Pylkina; Niklas Hogner	
2007	(Germany); Aljona Savchenko; Robin Szolkowy	(Canada); Meagan Duhamel; Craig Buntin	(United States); Amanda Evora; Mark Ladwig	
2008	(Germany); Aljona Savchenko; Robin Szolkowy	(Russia); Maria Mukhortova; Maxim Trankov	(Ukraine); Tatiana Volosozhar; Stanislav Morozov	
2009	(Germany); Aljona Savchenko; Robin Szolkowy	(Ukraine); Tatiana Volosozhar; Stanislav Morozov	(Canada); Anabelle Langlois; Cody Hay	
2010	(Russia); Vera Bazarova; Yuri Larionov	(Italy); Stefania Berton; Ondřej Hotárek	(Canada); Meagan Duhamel; Eric Radford	
2011	(Russia); Tatiana Volosozhar; Maxim Trankov	(Russia); Vera Bazarova; Yuri Larionov	(United States); Caydee Denney; John Coughlin	
2012	(Russia); Tatiana Volosozhar; Maxim Trankov	(United States); Caydee Denney; John Coughlin	(France); Vanessa James; Morgan Ciprès	
2013	(Russia); Tatiana Volosozhar; Maxim Trankov	(Germany); Maylin Wende; Daniel Wende	(Germany); Mari Vartmann; Aaron Van Cleave	
2014 CS	(Russia); Yuko Kavaguti; Alexander Smirnov	(Russia); Evgenia Tarasova; Vladimir Morozov	(United States); Alexa Scimeca; Chris Knierim	
2015 CS	(Russia); Tatiana Volosozhar; Maxim Trankov	(United States); Alexa Scimeca; Chris Knierim	(France); Vanessa James; Morgan Ciprès	
2016 CS	(Germany); Aljona Savchenko; Bruno Massot	(Canada); Lubov Ilyushechkina; Dylan Moscovitch	(Germany); Mari Vartmann; Ruben Blommaert	
2017 CS	(Russia); Evgenia Tarasova; Vladimir Morozov	(Germany); Aljona Savchenko; Bruno Massot	(Australia); Ekaterina Alexandrovskaya; Harley Windsor	
2018 CS	(Russia); Alisa Efimova; Alexander Korovin	(United States); Alexa Scimeca Knierim; Chris Knierim	(United States); Deanna Stellato; Nathan Bartholomay	
2019 CS	(Canada); Kirsten Moore-Towers; Michael Marinaro	(United States); Alexa Scimeca Knierim; Chris Knierim	(North Korea); Ryom Tae-ok; Kim Ju-sik	
2020 CS	(Italy); Rebecca Ghilardi; Filippo Ambrosini	(Germany); Annika Hocke; Robert Kunkel	(France); Cléo Hamon; Denys Strekalin	
2021 CS	(Germany); Minerva Fabienne Hase; Nolan Seegert	(Spain); Laura Barquero; Marco Zandron	(Georgia (country)); Karina Safina; Luka Berulava	
2022 CS	(Canada); Deanna Stellato; Maxime Deschamps	(Germany); Alisa Efimova; Ruben Blommaert	(Germany); Annika Hocke; Robert Kunkel	
2023 CS	(Germany); Minerva Fabienne Hase; Nikita Volodin	(Italy); Lucrezia Beccari; Matteo Guarise	(Germany); Annika Hocke; Robert Kunkel	
2024 CS	(Germany); Minerva Fabienne Hase; Nikita Volodin	(Canada); Deanna Stellato-Dudek; Maxime Deschamps	(United States); Ellie Kam; Daniel O'Shea	
2025 CS	(Germany); Minerva Fabienne Hase; Nikita Volodin	(Japan); Riku Miura; Ryuichi Kihara	(United States); Alisa Efimova; Misha Mitrofanov	
2026 CS	(Canada); Lia Pereira; Trennt Michaud	(United States); Audrey Shin; Spencer Akira Howe	(China); Zhang Jiaxuan; Huang Yihang	

=== Ice dance ===
Ice dance event medalists
Year	Gold	Silver	Bronze	Ref.
1970	(West Germany); Angelika Buck; Erich Buck	(United Kingdom); Kay Webster; Malcolm Taylor	(West Germany); Astrid Kopp; Axel Kopp	
1971	(West Germany); Angelika Buck; Erich Buck	(United Kingdom); Rosalind Druce; David Barker	(France); Anne-Claude Wolfers; Roland Mars	
1972	(United States); Mary-Karen Campell; Johnny Johns	(United Kingdom); Rosalind Druce; David Barker	(United Kingdom); Dixie Lee; Alan Smith	
1973	(United Kingdom); Rosalind Druce; David Barker	(United Kingdom); Janet Thompson; Warren Maxwell	(United States); Jane Pankey; Richard Horne	
1974	(United States); Judi Genovesi; Kent Weigle	(United Kingdom); Odette Tolman; Trevor Davies	(United Kingdom); Jennifer Thompson; Derek Tyers	
1975	(Canada); Lorna Wighton; John Dowding	(Soviet Union); Elena Garanina; Igor Zavozin	(Soviet Union); Marina Zoueva; Andrei Vitman	
1976	(Soviet Union); Marina Zoueva; Andrei Vitman	(United Kingdom); Jayne Torvill; Christopher Dean	(United Kingdom); Carole Long; Philip Stowell	
1977	(United Kingdom); Jayne Torvill; Christopher Dean	(United States); Carol Fox; Richard Dalley	(United Kingdom); Wendy Sessions; Mark Reed	
1978	(Soviet Union); Elena Garanina; Igor Zavozin	(United States); Kim Krohn; Barry Hagan	(Canada); Joanne French; John Thomas	
1979	(Canada); Gina Aucoin; Hans-Peter Ponikau	(United Kingdom); Carol Long; John Philpot	(Soviet Union); Tatiana Durasova; Sergei Ponomarenko	
1980	(United Kingdom); Wendy Sessions; Stephen Williams	(West Germany); Birgit Goller; Peter Klisch	(United States); Susan Marie Dymecki; Anthony Bardin	
1981	(United Kingdom); Karen Roughton; Mark Reed	(West Germany); Birgit Goller; Peter Klisch	(United States); Janice Kindrachuk; Blake Hobson	
1982	(Soviet Union); Marina Klimova; Sergei Ponomarenko	(Canada); Isabelle Duchesnay; Paul Duchesnay	(West Germany); Antonia Becherer; Ferdinand Becherer	
1983	(Soviet Union); Marina Klimova; Sergei Ponomarenko	(United States); Eleanor DeVera; James Yorke	(West Germany); Antonia Becherer; Ferdinand Becherer	
1984	(United States); Lois Luciani; Russ Witherby	(Soviet Union); Irina Zhuk; Oleg Petrov	(United States); Kristan Lowery; Chip Rossbach	
1985	(Soviet Union); Maya Usova; Alexander Zhulin	(West Germany); Antonia Becherer; Ferdinand Becherer	(France); Doriane Bontemps; Charles Paliard	
1986	(West Germany); Antonia Becherer; Ferdinand Becherer	(Soviet Union); Svetlana Liapina; Gorsha Sur	(Canada); Michelle McDonald; Michael Farrington	
1987	(Soviet Union); Ilona Melnichenko; Gennady Kaskov	(Italy); Stefania Calegari; Pasquale Camerlengo	(United States); Dorothi Rodek; Robert Nardozza	
1988	(Soviet Union); Ilona Melnichenko; Gennady Kaskov	(United States); Elizabeth McLean; Ari Lieb	(Canada); Jacqueline Petr; Mark Janoschak	
1989	(France); Isabelle Sarech; Xavier Debernis	(United States); Lisa Grove; Scott Myers	(France); Dominique Yvon; Frédéric Palluel	
1990	(Canada); Isabelle LaBossière; Mitchell Gould	(United Kingdom); Lisa Bradby; Alan Towers	(France); Christelle Descolis; Ludovic Deville	
1991	(Soviet Union); Irina Lobacheva; Alexei Pospelov	(Soviet Union); Elena Kustarova; Oleg Ovsyannikov	(Canada); Marie-France Dubreuil; Bruno Yvars	
1992	(Canada); Shae-Lynn Bourne; Victor Kraatz	(Russia); Olga Ganicheva; Maxim Kachanov	(Lithuania); Margarita Drobiazko; Povilas Vanagas	
1993	(Canada); Martine Patenaude; Eric Massé	(United States); Rachel Mayer; Peter Breen	(Lithuania); Margarita Drobiazko; Povilas Vanagas	
1994	(France); Barbara Piton; Alexandre Piton	(Ukraine); Elena Grushina; Ruslan Honcharov	(Canada); Chantal Lefebvre; Patrice Lauzon	
1995	(Russia); Olga Sharutenko; Dmitri Naumkin	(Poland); Iwona Filipowicz; Michal Szumski	(France); Agnes Jacquemard; Alexis Gayet	
1996	(Russia); Ekaterina Svirina; Vladimir Leliukh	(United States); Eve Chalom; Mathew Gates	(France); Isabelle Delobel; Olivier Schoenfelder	
1997	(Russia); Olga Sharutenko; Dmitri Naumkin	(Russia); Nina Ulanova; Michail Stifunin	(Bulgaria); Albena Denkova; Maxim Staviski	
1998	(Russia); Nina Ulanova; Michail Stifunin	(United States); Debbie Koegel; Oleg Fediukov	(France); Alia Ouabdelsselam; Benjamin Delmas	
1999	(United States); Jamie Silverstein; Justin Pekarek	(France); Alia Ouabdelsselam; Benjamin Delmas	(Germany); Stephanie Rauer; Thomas Rauer	
2000	(Canada); Chantal Lefebvre; Justin Lanning	(France); Magali Sauri; Michail Stifunin	(United Kingdom); Marika Humphreys; Vitali Baranov	
2001	(Poland); Sylwia Nowak; Sebastian Kolasiński	(Italy); Federica Faiella; Massimo Scali	(Russia); Anastasia Belova; Ilia Isaev	
2002	(Italy); Federica Faiella; Massimo Scali	(United States); Melissa Gregory; Denis Petukhov	(Russia); Anastasia Belova; Ilia Isaev	
2003	(Russia); Svetlana Kulikova; Vitali Novikov	(Russia); Jana Khokhlova; Sergei Novitski	(United States); Christie Moxley; Alexandr Kirsanov	
2004	(United States); Lydia Manon; Ryan O'Meara	(Canada); Martine Patinaude; Pascal Denis	(United Kingdom); Phillipa Towler-Green; Phillip Poole	
2005	(United States); Tanith Belbin; Benjamin Agosto	(Lithuania); Margarita Drobiazko; Povilas Vanagas	(Germany); Christina Beier; William Beier	
2006	(United Kingdom); Sinead Kerr; John Kerr	(United States); Morgan Matthews; Maxim Zavozin	(Israel); Alexandra Zaretsky; Roman Zaretsky	
2007	(United States); Jennifer Wester; Daniil Barantsev	(Germany); Christina Beier; William Beier	(Ukraine); Alla Beknazarova; Vladimir Zuev	
2008	(United States); Emily Samuelson; Evan Bates	(Israel); Alexandra Zaretsky; Roman Zaretsky	(United States); Jane Summersett; Todd Gilles	
2009	(United States); Meryl Davis; Charlie White	(Israel); Alexandra Zaretsky; Roman Zaretsky	(Lithuania); Katherine Copely; Deividas Stagniūnas	
2010	(France); Nathalie Péchalat; Fabian Bourzat	(Italy); Anna Cappellini; Luca Lanotte	(Russia); Ekaterina Riazanova; Ilia Tkachenko	
2011	(United States); Madison Hubbell; Zachary Donohue	(Germany); Nelli Zhiganshina; Alexander Gazsi	(Canada); Kharis Ralph; Asher Hill	
2012	(United States); Madison Chock; Evan Bates	(Azerbaijan); Julia Zlobina; Alexei Sitnikov]	(Germany); Nelli Zhiganshina; Alexander Gazsi	
2013	(United States); Madison Hubbell; Zachary Donohue	(Russia); Ksenia Monko; Kirill Khaliavin	(Canada); Alexandra Paul; Mitchell Islam	
2014 CS	(Canada); Kaitlyn Weaver; Andrew Poje	(United States); Madison Chock; Evan Bates	(Germany); Nelli Zhiganshina; Alexander Gazsi	
2015 CS	(United States); Madison Chock; Evan Bates	(Canada); Alexandra Paul; Mitchell Islam	(United States); Anastasia Cannuscio; Colin McManus	
2016 CS	(Italy); Anna Cappellini; Luca Lanotte	(United States); Madison Chock; Evan Bates	(Canada); Piper Gilles; Paul Poirier	
2017 CS	(United Kingdom); Penny Coomes; Nicholas Buckland	(Japan); Kana Muramoto; Chris Reed	(Germany); Kavita Lorenz; Joti Polizoakis	
2018 CS	(Canada); Piper Gilles; Paul Poirier	(United States); Rachel Parsons; Michael Parsons	(United States); Christina Carreira; Anthony Ponomarenko	
2019 CS	(Canada); Laurence Fournier Beaudry; Nikolaj Sørensen	(United States); Kaitlin Hawayek; Jean-Luc Baker	(United States); Christina Carreira; Anthony Ponomarenko	
2020 CS	(Czech Republic); Natálie Taschlerová; Filip Taschler	(United Kingdom); Sasha Fear; George Waddell	(Ukraine); Darya Popova; Volodymyr Byelikov	
2021 CS	(Finland); Juulia Turkkila; Matthias Versluis	(Germany); Katharina Müller; Tim Dieck	(Georgia (country)); Maria Kazakova; Georgy Reviya	
2022 CS	(United Kingdom); Lilah Fear; Lewis Gibson	(Lithuania); Allison Reed; Saulius Ambrulevičius	(Canada); Carolane Soucisse; Shane Firus	
2023 CS	(United Kingdom); Lilah Fear; Lewis Gibson	(Lithuania); Allison Reed; Saulius Ambrulevičius	(Finland); Juulia Turkkila; Matthias Versluis	
2024 CS	(United Kingdom); Lilah Fear; Lewis Gibson	(United States); Christina Carreira; Anthony Ponomarenko	(United States); Emilea Zingas; Vadym Kolesnik	
2025 CS	(United Kingdom); Lilah Fear; Lewis Gibson	(United States); Christina Carreira; Anthony Ponomarenko	(Canada); Marie-Jade Lauriault; Romain Le Gac	
2026 CS	(United States); Christina Carreira; Anthony Ponomarenko	(Canada); Marie-Jade Lauriault; Romain le Gac	(Australia); Holly Harris; Jason Chan	

== Records ==
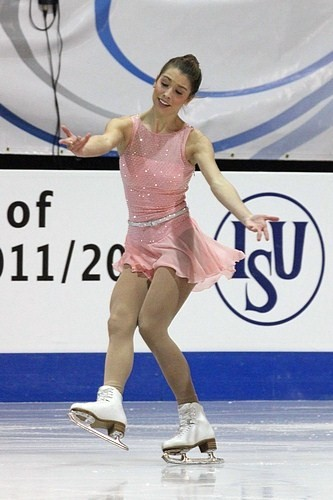
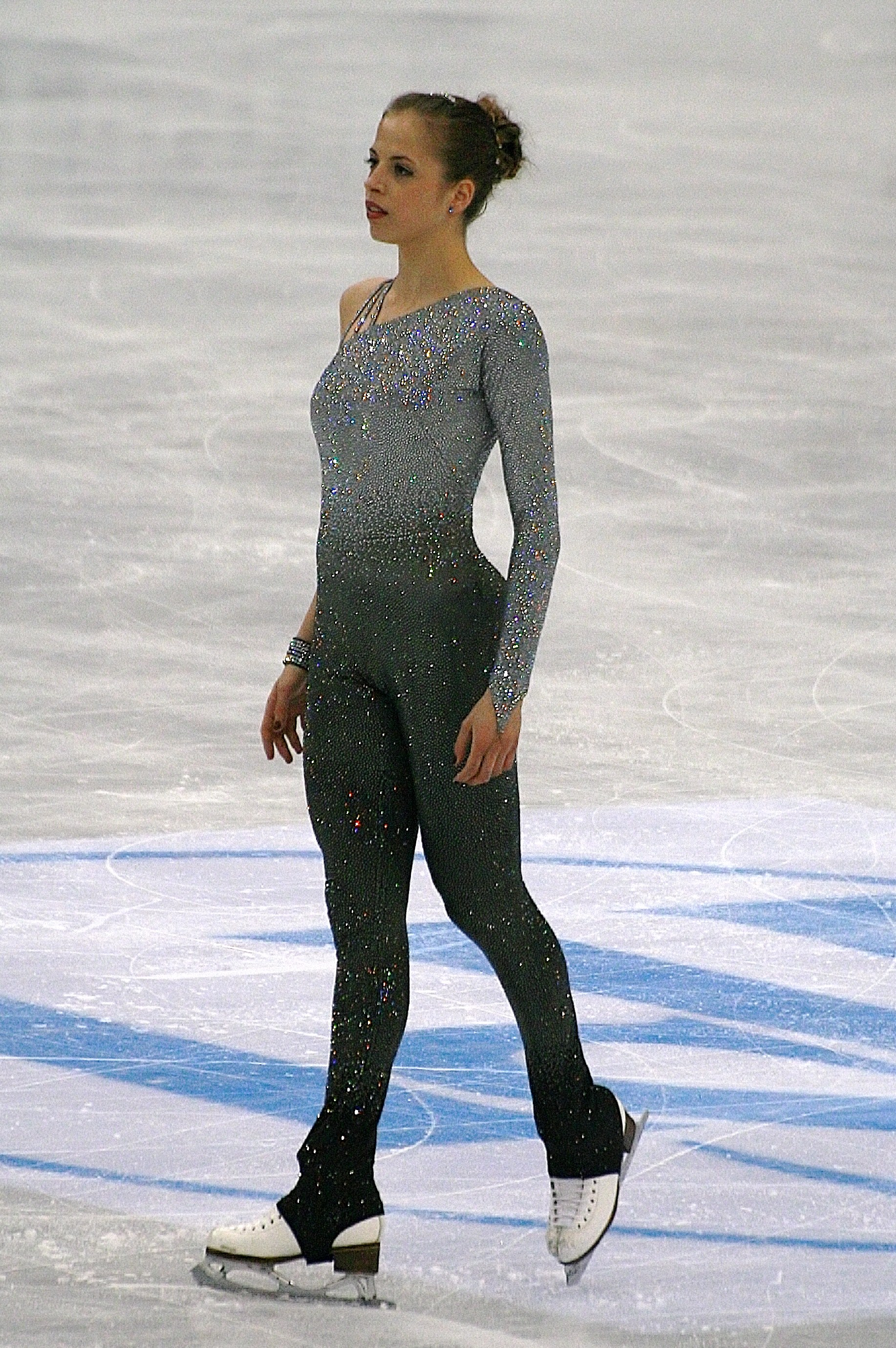
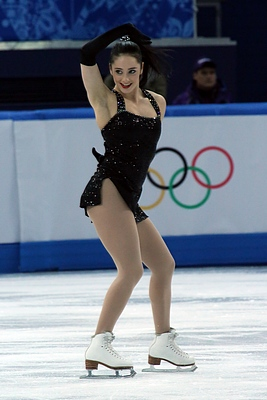
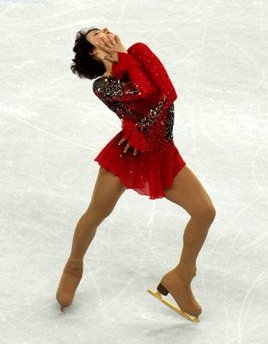
From left to right: Four skaters each won two Nebelhorn Trophy titles in women's singles: Alissa Czisny of the United States, Carolina Kostner of Italy, Kaetlyn Osmond of Canada, and Irina Slutskaya of Russia.
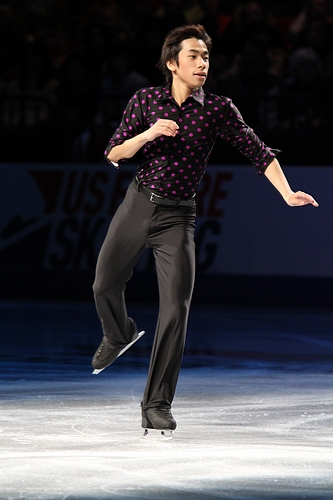
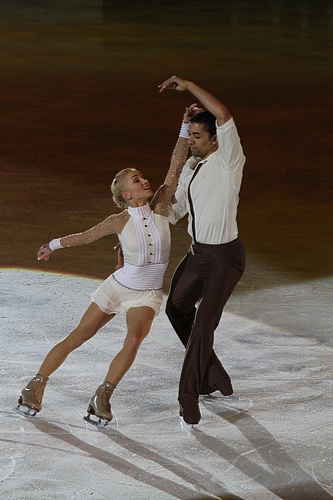
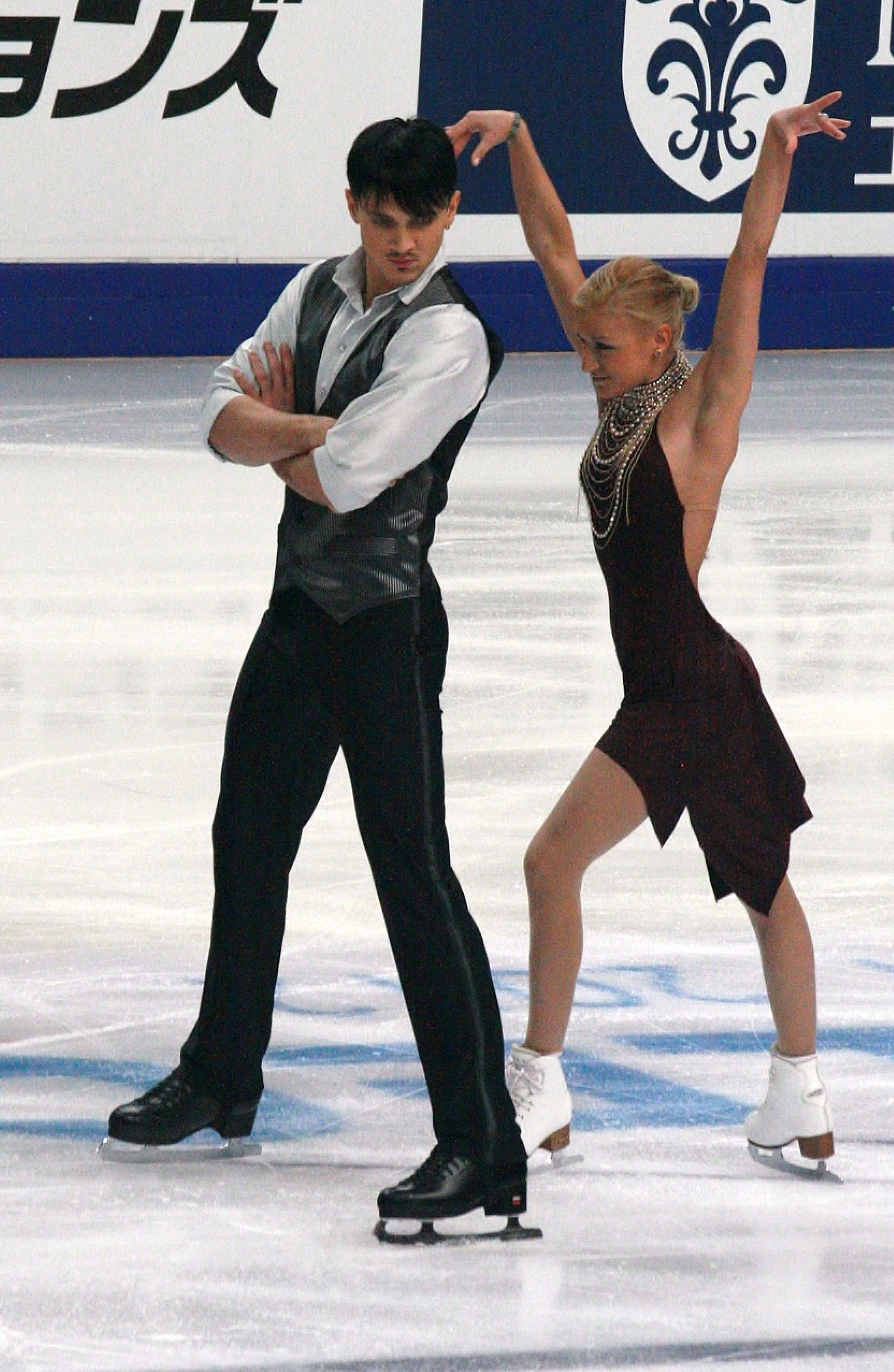
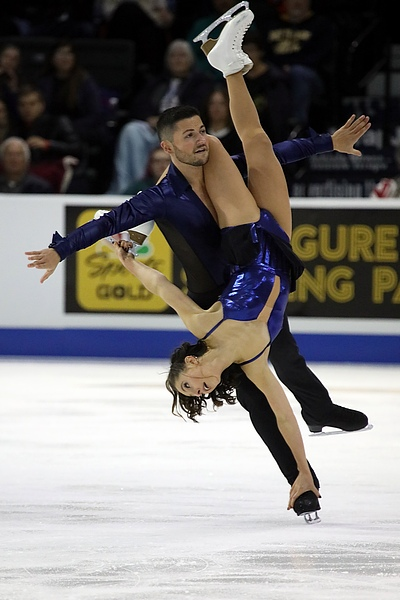
From left to right: Nobunari Oda of Japan won three Nebelhorn Trophy titles in men's singles; Aljona Savchenko and Robin Szolkowy of Germany, and Tatiana Volosozhar and Maxim Trankov of Russia, each won four Nebelhorn Trophy titles in pair skating; and Lilah Fear and Lewis Gibson of Great Britain have won four Nebelhorn Trophy titles in ice dance.

Records
Discipline	Most titles			
Discipline	Skater(s)	No.	Years	Ref.
Men's singles	(Japan); Nobunari Oda	3	2008; 2012–13	
Women's singles	(United States); Alissa Czisny	2	2008–09	
Women's singles	(Italy); Carolina Kostner	2	2002; 2007	
Women's singles	(Canada); Kaetlyn Osmond	2	2012; 2015	
Women's singles	(Russia); Irina Slutskaya	2	1993–94	
Pairs	(Germany); Minerva Fabienne Hase; (Note: Minerva Fabienne Hase won one title while partnered with Nolan Seegert (2021), and three titles while partnered with Nikita Volodin (2023–25).)	4	2021; 2023–25	
Pairs	(Germany); Aljona Savchenko; Robin Szolkowy	4	2005; 2007–09	
Pairs	(Ukraine); (Germany); Aljona Savchenko; (Note: Aljona Savchenko won one title with Stanislav Morozov while representing Ukraine (1999), four titles with Robin Szolkowy while representing Germany (2005, 2007–09), and one title with Bruno Massot while representing Germany (2016).)	6	1999; 2005; 2007–09; 2016	
Pairs	(Russia); Tatiana Volosozhar; Maxim Trankov	4	2011–13; 2015	
Ice dance	(United Kingdom); Lilah Fear; Lewis Gibson	4	2022–25	

== Cumulative medal count ==
=== Men's singles ===
Total number of Nebelhorn Trophy medals in men's singles by nation
Rank	Nation	Gold	Silver	Bronze	Total
1	United States	16	21	8	45
2	Canada	9	4	11	24
3	Japan	8	4	2	14
4	West Germany	7	4	6	17
5	Russia	5	6	8	19
6	Czech Republic	2	3	3	8
7	Belarus	2	0	0	2
8	France	1	2	4	7
9	Soviet Union	1	1	3	5
10	Germany	1	1	1	3
11	Belgium	1	1	0	2
12	Latvia	1	0	1	2
12	Switzerland	1	0	1	2
14	Austria	1	0	0	1
14	Chinese Taipei	1	0	0	1
14	Estonia	1	0	0	1
17	Ukraine	0	4	2	6
18	Italy	0	3	0	3
19	Sweden	0	1	2	3
20	Great Britain	0	1	1	2
21	Romania	0	1	0	1
21	South Korea	0	1	0	1
23	Luxembourg	0	0	2	2
24	Denmark	0	0	1	1
24	Israel	0	0	1	1
24	Netherlands	0	0	1	1
Totals (26 entries)		58	58	58	174

=== Women's singles ===
Total number of Nebelhorn Trophy medals in women's singles by nation
Rank	Nation	Gold	Silver	Bronze	Total
1	United States	25	12	12	49
2	Russia	7	7	5	19
3	West Germany	4	8	8	20
4	Japan	4	6	4	14
5	Canada	3	4	8	15
6	Ukraine	3	0	1	4
7	Italy	2	1	1	4
8	Germany	2	0	1	3
9	Finland	1	6	3	10
10	Great Britain	1	2	1	4
11	France	1	2	0	3
12	Belgium	1	0	1	2
12	Estonia	1	0	1	2
14	Australia	1	0	0	1
14	Czechoslovakia	1	0	0	1
14	Norway	1	0	0	1
17	Switzerland	0	3	3	6
18	South Korea	0	2	2	4
19	Sweden	0	2	1	3
20	Czech Republic	0	1	1	2
21	Georgia	0	1	0	1
21	Poland	0	1	0	1
23	Soviet Union	0	0	3	3
24	Belarus	0	0	1	1
24	China	0	0	1	1
Totals (25 entries)		58	58	58	174

=== Pairs ===
Total number of Nebelhorn Trophy medals in pairs by nation
Rank	Nation	Gold	Silver	Bronze	Total
1	Canada	17	14	10	41
2	United States	9	15	18	42
3	Russia	9	5	1	15
4	Germany	9	4	5	18
5	Soviet Union	6	6	0	12
6	West Germany	3	2	2	7
7	Ukraine	2	3	2	7
8	Italy	1	2	0	3
9	Great Britain	1	1	2	4
10	France	0	1	5	6
11	Japan	0	1	1	2
12	Latvia	0	1	0	1
12	Spain	0	1	0	1
14	Austria	0	0	2	2
15	Australia	0	0	1	1
15	China	0	0	1	1
15	Czechoslovakia	0	0	1	1
15	Georgia	0	0	1	1
15	Kazakhstan	0	0	1	1
15	North Korea	0	0	1	1
15	Sweden	0	0	1	1
Totals (21 entries)		57	56	55	168

=== Ice dance ===
Total number of Nebelhorn Trophy medals in ice dance by nation
Rank	Nation	Gold	Silver	Bronze	Total
1	United States	14	16	11	41
2	Great Britain	10	9	6	25
3	Canada	9	4	10	23
4	Soviet Union	8	4	2	14
5	Russia	5	4	3	12
6	West Germany	3	3	3	9
7	France	3	2	7	12
8	Italy	2	3	0	5
9	Poland	1	1	0	2
10	Finland	1	0	1	2
11	Czech Republic	1	0	0	1
12	Germany	0	3	5	8
13	Lithuania	0	3	3	6
14	Israel	0	2	1	3
15	Ukraine	0	1	2	3
16	Azerbaijan	0	1	0	1
16	Japan	0	1	0	1
18	Australia	0	0	1	1
18	Bulgaria	0	0	1	1
18	Georgia	0	0	1	1
Totals (20 entries)		57	57	57	171

=== Total medals ===
Total number of Nebelhorn Trophy medals by nation
Rank	Nation	Gold	Silver	Bronze	Total
1	United States	64	64	49	177
2	Canada	38	26	39	103
3	Russia	26	22	17	65
4	West Germany	17	17	19	53
5	Soviet Union	15	11	8	34
6	Great Britain	12	13	10	35
7	Japan	12	12	7	31
8	Germany	12	8	12	32
9	Italy	5	9	1	15
10	Ukraine	5	8	7	20
11	France	5	7	16	28
12	Czech Republic	3	4	4	11
13	Finland	2	6	4	12
14	Belgium	2	1	1	4
15	Belarus	2	0	1	3
15	Estonia	2	0	1	3
17	Switzerland	1	3	4	8
18	Poland	1	2	0	3
19	Latvia	1	1	1	3
20	Australia	1	0	2	3
20	Austria	1	0	2	3
22	Czechoslovakia	1	0	1	2
23	Chinese Taipei	1	0	0	1
23	Norway	1	0	0	1
25	Sweden	0	3	4	7
26	Lithuania	0	3	3	6
27	South Korea	0	3	2	5
28	Israel	0	2	2	4
29	Georgia	0	1	2	3
30	Azerbaijan	0	1	0	1
30	Romania	0	1	0	1
30	Spain	0	1	0	1
33	China	0	0	2	2
33	Luxembourg	0	0	2	2
35	Bulgaria	0	0	1	1
35	Denmark	0	0	1	1
35	Kazakhstan	0	0	1	1
35	Netherlands	0	0	1	1
35	North Korea	0	0	1	1
Totals (39 entries)		230	229	228	687
