= Morgan Matthews (figure skater) =

American ice dancer (born 1987)

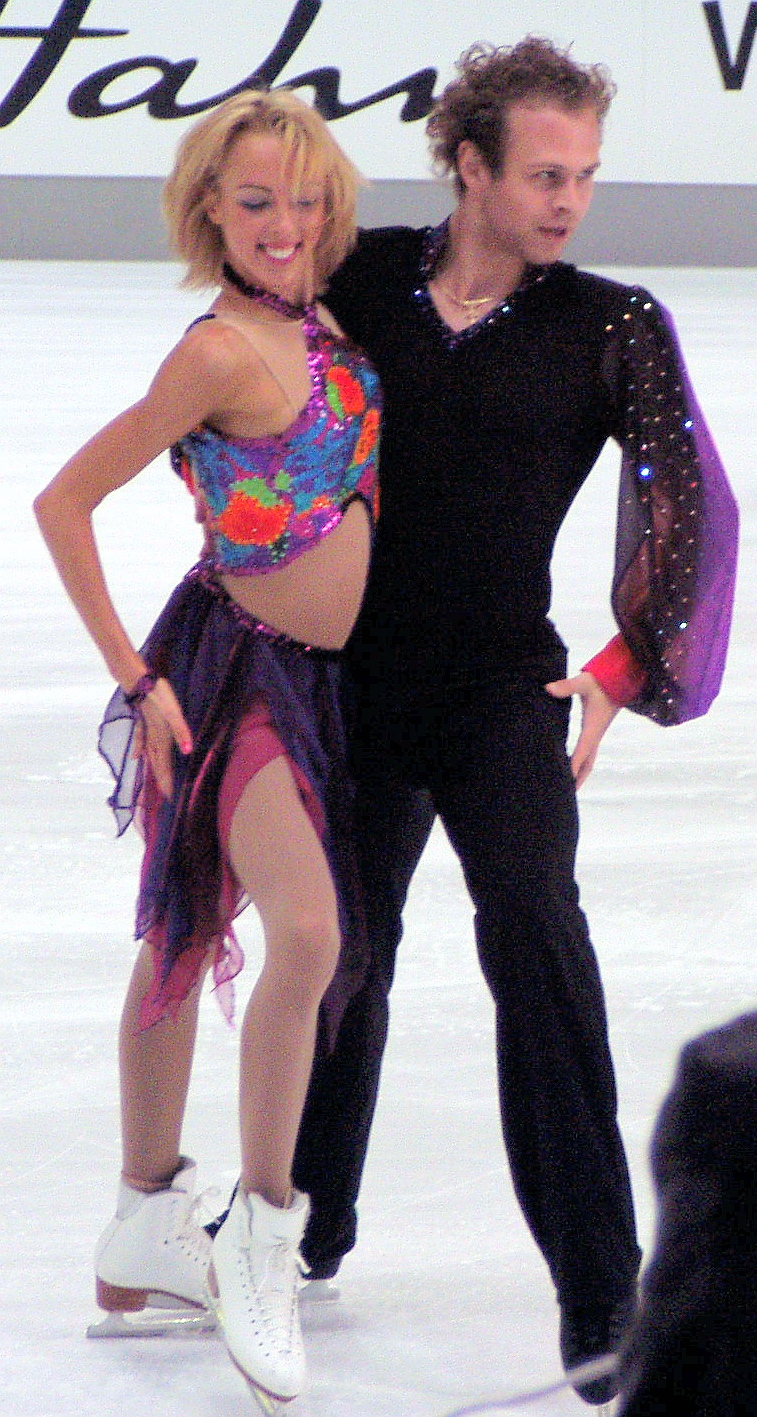
- Matthews and Maxim Zavozin in 2006.

Personal information
- Born: May 21, 1987 (age 39) Chicago, Illinois, U.S.
- Height: 5 ft 7 in (1.70 m)

Figure skating career
- Country: United States
- Skating club: Skating Club of New York
- Began skating: 1993
- Retired: 2009
Medal record
Figure skating: Ice dancing
Representing the United States
Four Continents Championships
Silver medal – second place	2006 Colorado Springs	Ice dancing
World Junior Championships
Gold medal – first place	2005 Kitchener	Ice dancing
Bronze medal – third place	2004 The Hague	Ice dancing

Morgan Matthews (born May 21, 1987) is an American former competitive ice dancer. With Maxim Zavozin, she is the 2006 Four Continents silver medalist and 2005 World Junior champion.

== Personal life ==
Matthews was born May 21, 1987, in Chicago. She settled in Boston in May 2010. An economics major, she graduated from Wellesley College in May 2016.

== Career ==
Early in her career, Matthews competed in pair skating. In 1999 she and partner Val Rising-Moore placed 5th in the novice pairs event at U.S. Nationals.

Matthews teamed up with Maxim Zavozin in 2001. The ice dancing duo became the 2003 and 2004 U.S. junior champions and went on to capture the 2005 World Junior title. They won the pewter medal at the 2006 U.S. Championships and were sent to the 2006 Four Continents where they won silver. The next season, they placed fifth at the 2007 U.S. Championships. Matthews and Zavozin announced the end of their partnership on February 26, 2007.

Matthews teamed up with Canadian Leif Gislason. They intended to represent Canada but Matthews' request for a release was denied by U.S. Figure Skating. Their partnership ended after two years and a 5th-place finish at U.S. Nationals. She began a partnership with Elliot Pennington, who last competed in 2005 with Jane Summersett.

Matthews had hip injuries due to a macerated labrum, acetabular dysplasia, and vascular necrosis. This led to her competitive retirement, in September 2009. In 2010, she joined the coaching staff at The Skating Club of Boston.

== Programs ==
(with Zavozin)

Season	Original dance	Free dance
2006–07	Tango: Autumn in Buenos Aires	The Piano Player by Maksim Mrvica
2005–06	Cha Cha: Shall We Dance; Samba: Carapiecho	Tango de Roxane (from Moulin Rouge!)
2004–05	Charleston: Thoroughly Modern Millie; Slow foxtrot; Quickstep	Lord of the Dance by Ronan Hardiman
2003–04	Rock'n'roll: Jailhouse Rock; Blues: Jelly Roll Blues performed by Louis Armstrong; Jitterbug: Tutti Frutti	Bolero by Maurice Ravel
2002–03	Waltz: Die Fledermaus; Galop: Banditen-Galopp; Waltz: Die Fledermaus by Johann Strauss II	Mr. Midnight; Angel of Music (from The Phantom of the Opera on Ice) by Roberto Danova; Overture (from The Phantom of the Opera) by Andrew Lloyd Webber

== Competitive highlights ==
GP: Grand Prix; JGP: Junior Grand Prix

=== With Gislason ===
Event	2008–09
U.S. Championships	5th

=== With Zavozin ===
International
Event	02–03	03–04	04–05	05–06	06–07
Worlds				16th	
Four Continents				2nd	
GP Bompard				4th	
GP Cup of China				5th	
GP Cup of Russia					6th
GP Skate America					4th
Nebelhorn Trophy					2nd
International: Junior
Junior Worlds	11th	3rd	1st		
JGP Final		3rd	1st		
JGP Canada	3rd				
JGP Croatia		1st			
JGP France			1st		
JGP Italy	4th				
JGP Slovakia		3rd			
JGP United States			1st		
National
U.S. Champ.	1st J	1st J	5th	4th	5th
