= Elena Garanina =

Soviet ice dancer (born 1956)

Personal information
- Native name: Елена Анатольевна Гаранина
- Full name: Elena Anatolyevna Garanina
- Born: 19 October 1956 (age 69) Moscow, Russian SFSR, Soviet Union

Figure skating career
- Country: Soviet Union

Elena Anatolyevna Garanina (Russian: Елена Анатольевна Гаранина; born 19 October 1956) is a former ice dancer who represented the Soviet Union. With Igor Zavozin, she is the 1978 Nebelhorn Trophy and 1981 Winter Universiade champion. They never made it to the World Figure Skating Championships due to the depth of the Soviet dance field. After turning pro, the duo performed in Jayne Torvill and Christopher Dean's ice shows.

Garanina currently works as a coach. Her students have included:

- Morgan Matthews / Maxim Zavozin
- Katherine Copely / Deividas Stagniūnas
- Kayla Nicole Frey / Deividas Stagniūnas
- Julia Gibson and Michael Boutsan

Garanina was formerly married to Igor Zavozin. Their son, ice dancer Maxim Zavozin, was born on 2 March 1985 in Moscow. Garanina's second husband, Valery Spiridonov, competed in pairs. She gave birth to their son, Anton Spiridonov, on 5 August 1998 in the United States.

== Competitive highlights ==
(with Igor Zavozin)

International
Event	75–76	76–77	77–78	78–79	79–80	80–81	81–82	82–83
Skate America							2nd	2nd
St. Ivel						2nd		
Moscow News				2nd				
Nebelhorn	2nd			1st				
Universiade						1st		
National
Soviet Champ.		5th	2nd		4th	5th	5th	6th
