= Antonia Becherer =

German ice dancer

Antonia Becherer (born 7 June 1963 in Konstanz, Baden-Württemberg) is a German former ice dancer. With her twin brother Ferdinand Becherer, she was a three-time German national champion. They placed 9th at the 1988 Winter Olympics. They represented the club Konstanzer ERC.

== Results ==
(with Ferdinand Becherer)

Event	1981-82	1982-83	1983-84	1984-85	1985-86	1986-87	1987-88
Winter Olympics							9th
World Championships			15th	16th	8th	7th	8th
European Championships		11th	12th	10th	5th	7th	WD
German Championships	4th	2nd	2nd	2nd	1st	1st	1st
Skate America					3rd		
Fujifilm Trophy							2nd
NHK Trophy				5th		4th	
Nebelhorn Trophy		3rd	3rd		2nd	1st	
