= Stefania Calegari =

Italian ice dancer (born 1967)

Personal information
- Born: 22 March 1967 (age 59) Sesto San Giovanni, Italy
- Height: 1.62 m (5 ft 4 in)

Figure skating career
- Country: Italy
- Retired: 1993

Stefania Calegari (born 22 March 1967) is an Italian former ice dancer. She competed with Pasquale Camerlengo for around ten years. They won gold medals at the 1990 Skate America, 1990 Grand Prix International de Paris, and 1991 Skate Canada International, a silver medal at the 1992 Nations Cup, and bronze medals at the 1990 and 1991 NHK Trophy. In 1992, they achieved their highest results at the European Championships and World Championships, placing fourth at both events. They also competed at the 1992 Winter Olympics and finished fifth.

== Results ==
(ice dance with Pasquale Camerlengo)

| Event | 1983–84 | 1985–86 | 1986–87 | 1987–88 | 1988–89 | 1989–90 | 1990–91 | 1991–92 | 1992–93 |
|---|---|---|---|---|---|---|---|---|---|
| Winter Olympics | | | | | | | | 5th | |
| World Championships | | 15th | | | 7th | 10th | 6th | 4th | 6th |
| European Championships | | 12th | 13th | 11th | 5th | | 6th | 4th | 5th |
| Skate America | | | 6th | | | | 1st | | |
| Skate Canada International | | | | | 4th | | | 1st | |
| Int. de Paris | | | | | | | 1st | | |
| NHK Trophy | 7th | | | | | | 3rd | 3rd | |
| Nations Cup | | | | | | | | | 2nd |
| Nebelhorn Trophy | | | | 2nd | | | | | |
| Golden Spin of Zagreb | | | | 2nd | | | | | |
| Italian Championships | | 2nd | 3rd | | 1st | | 1st | 1st | 1st |
