= Maxim Zavozin =

Hungarian figure skater (born 1985)

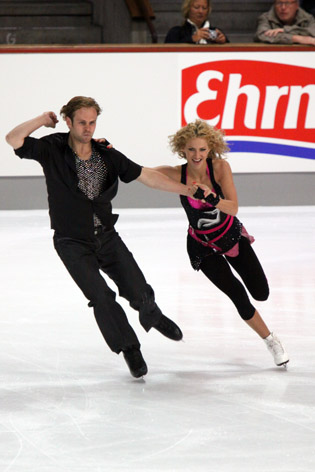
- Hoffmann and Zavozin in 2009

Personal information
- Full name: Maxim Igorevich Zavozin
- Born: March 2, 1985 (age 41) Moscow, Russian SFSR, Soviet Union
- Home town: Ashburn, Virginia, U.S.
- Height: 5 ft 10 in (1.79 m)

Figure skating career
- Country: Hungary (2008–11); United States (until 2007)
- Began skating: 1999
- Retired: 2011
Medal record
Figure skating: Ice dancing
Representing the United States
Four Continents Championships
Silver medal – second place	2006 Colorado Springs	Ice dancing
World Junior Championships
Gold medal – first place	2005 Kitchener	Ice dancing
Bronze medal – third place	2004 The Hague	Ice dancing

Maxim Igorevich Zavozin (Russian: Максим Игоревич Завозин; born March 2, 1985) is a former competitive ice dancer who appeared internationally for the United States and Hungary. With Nóra Hoffmann for Hungary, he is the 2010 Cup of Russia silver medalist and a two-time (2009, 2010) Hungarian national champion. With Morgan Matthews for the United States, he is the 2006 Four Continents silver medalist and 2005 World Junior champion.

== Personal life ==
Zavozin was born in Moscow, Russian SFSR, Soviet Union. He is the son of Soviet ice dancers Elena Garanina and Igor Zavozin. He competed in ballroom dancing in Russia from the age of 7 to 11. Zavozin's younger half-brother, Anton Spiridonov, currently represents the United States in ice dance with Vanessa Pham.

Zavozin became a U.S. citizen on December 30, 2005. He became a Hungarian citizen on 25 January 2010, just before the 2010 Winter Olympics.

== Career ==
Zavozin first stepped onto the ice at the age of four but did not practice regularly due to extensive traveling. He stopped skating when he was seven and returned to it at 13. Early in his career, Zavozin competed with partner Stephanie Ellis.

=== Partnership with Matthews ===
Zavozin teamed up with Morgan Matthews in 2001. They were coached by his mother, Elena Garanina, and Valeriy Spiridonov in Sunrise, Florida. They became the 2003 and 2004 U.S. junior champions and went on to capture the 2005 World Junior title. They won the pewter medal at the 2006 U.S. Championships and were sent to the 2006 Four Continents where they won silver. The next season, they placed fifth at the 2007 U.S. Championships. Matthews and Zavozin announced the end of their partnership on February 26, 2007.

=== Partnership with Hoffmann ===
Zavozin teamed up with Hungarian Nóra Hoffmann in September 2007 to compete for Hungary. They had competed against each other at 2004 Junior Worlds.

During the 2008–09 season, Hoffmann/Zavozin did not compete on the Grand Prix circuit but won the 2009 Hungarian national title and were given a berth to the 2009 European Championships. Despite Zavozin having a fever, they skated in the original dance at Europeans, but his condition worsened and they had to withdraw before the free dance. They missed the 2009 World Championships due to a serious head injury to Hoffmann while training in the U.S. on March 4, 2009.

During the 2009–10 season, Hoffmann/Zavozin missed the Grand Prix series. They competed at the 2010 European Championships where they placed 10th. They qualified for the 2010 Olympics where they finished 13th. At the 2010 World Championships, they finished in 10th.

In the 2010–11 season, Hoffmann/Zavozin made their first appearance together on the Grand Prix series. Their first event was 2010 Cup of China where they placed fourth. At 2010 Cup of Russia, they won silver, their first medal on the senior Grand Prix series. They finished third in both the short and free dance and set personal best scores in both. They competed at the 2011 European Championships where they finished 8th after receiving some low levels from the technical panel and a small stumble. On March 30, 2011, Hoffmann was hospitalized. Hoffmann / Zavozin had to withdraw from the 2011 World Championships. They did not compete in the 2011–12 season but said in March 2012 that they were considering returning to competition.

== Programs ==
=== With Hoffmann ===
Season	Short dance	Free dance
2010–11	Waltz: The Sleeping Beauty by Pyotr Tchaikovsky; Waltz: Les Patineurs by Émile Waldteufel	Nagyidai Cigányok (Gypsy Witch) by Experidance
	Original dance	
2009–10	Hungarian folk: Csardas	So Excited by Janet Jackson; Hush Hush by The Pussycat Dolls; Rock This Party
2008–09	Blues: Minnie the Moocher; Lindy Hop	So Excited by Janet Jackson; Too Late to Apologize; Rock This Party

=== With Matthews ===
Season	Original dance	Free dance
2006–07	Tango: Autumn in Buenos Aires	The Piano Player by Maksim Mrvica
2005–06	Cha Cha: Shall We Dance; Samba: Carapiecho	Tango de Roxane (from Moulin Rouge!)
2004–05	Charleston: Thoroughly Modern Millie; Slow foxtrot; Quickstep	Lord of the Dance by Ronan Hardiman
2003–04	Rock'n'roll: Jailhouse Rock; Blues: Jelly Roll Blues performed by Louis Armstrong; Jitterbug: Tutti Frutti	Bolero by Maurice Ravel
2002–03	Waltz: Die Fledermaus; Galop: Banditen-Galopp; Waltz: Die Fledermaus by Johann Strauss II	Mr. Midnight; Angel of Music (from The Phantom of the Opera on Ice) by Roberto Danova; Overture (from The Phantom of the Opera) by Andrew Lloyd Webber

== Competitive highlights ==
GP: Grand Prix; JGP: Junior Grand Prix

=== With Hoffmann for Hungary ===
International
Event	2008–09	2009–10	2010–11
Olympics		13th	
Worlds		10th	WD
Europeans	WD	10th	8th
GP Final			6th
GP Cup of China			4th
GP Cup of Russia			2nd
Finlandia Trophy			2nd
Ice Challenge		1st	
Nebelhorn Trophy		7th	
Nepela Memorial		1st	1st
Golden Spin		WD	
National
Hungarian Champ.	1st	1st	1st
WD: Withdrew

=== With Matthews for the United States ===
International
Event	02–03	03–04	04–05	05–06	06–07
Worlds				16th	
Four Continents				2nd	
GP Bompard				4th	
GP Cup of China				5th	
GP Cup of Russia					6th
GP Skate America					4th
Nebelhorn Trophy					2nd
International: Junior
Junior Worlds	11th	3rd	1st		
JGP Final		3rd	1st		
JGP Canada	3rd				
JGP Croatia		1st			
JGP France			1st		
JGP Italy	4th				
JGP Slovakia		3rd			
JGP United States			1st		
National
U.S. Champ.	1st J.	1st J.	5th	4th	5th
Levels – N: Novice; J: Junior
