= Xavier Debernis =

French ice dancer

Figure skating career
- Country: France
- Partner: Isabelle Sarech
- Coach: Gérard G.
- Retired: 1992

Xavier Debernis is a French former competitive ice dancer. With his skating partner, Isabelle Sarech, he became the 1989 Nebelhorn Trophy champion, 1990 Skate America silver medalist, 1991 Skate Electric bronze medalist, and a two-time French national bronze medalist.

The two were coached by Gérard G., the husband of Debernis' elder sister, in Lyon.

== Competitive highlights ==
with Sarech

International
Event	1985–86	1989–90	1990–91	1991–92
World Championships		12th	14th	
International de Paris		6th		8th
International St. Gervais		3rd		
Nebelhorn Trophy		1st		
Skate America			2nd	
Skate Electric				3rd
Merano Autumn Trophy	3rd			
National
French Championships		3rd	3rd	4th
