= Isabelle Sarech =

French ice dancer

Personal information
- Born: 1968 (age 57–58)

Figure skating career
- Country: France
- Partner: Xavier Debernis
- Coach: Gérard G.
- Retired: 1992

Isabelle Sarech (born in 1968) is a French former competitive ice dancer. With her skating partner, Xavier Debernis, she became the 1989 Nebelhorn Trophy champion, 1990 Skate America silver medalist, 1991 Skate Electric bronze medalist, and a two-time French national bronze medalist.

Sarech lived in Annecy before teaming up with Debernis. She then relocated to Lyon in order to train with him. The two were coached by Gérard G., the husband of Debernis' elder sister.

In February 2020, Sarech accused Gérard G. of sexually abusing her when she was a minor.

== Competitive highlights ==
with Debernis

International
Event	1985–86	1989–90	1990–91	1991–92
World Championships		12th	14th	
International de Paris		6th		8th
International St. Gervais		3rd		
Nebelhorn Trophy		1st		
Skate America			2nd	
Skate Electric				3rd
Merano Autumn Trophy	3rd			
National
French Championships		3rd	3rd	4th
