= Suzanne Otterson =

British figure skater (born 1974)

Suzanne Otterson (born 26 March 1974) is a British former figure skater. She competed at the 1992 Winter Olympics.
