= Banditen-Galopp =

Banditen-Galopp (Bandit's Gallop) is a galop composed by Johann Strauss II. It was arranged from melodies in Strauss' operetta Prinz Methusalem. The title of the composition is derived from the appearance in the stage work of a bandit gang intent on overthrowing the prince, and its main melody is in the Act 3 duet with chorus: "In der stille ganz verstohl'n werden wir Schätze hol'n." The finale of Act 1 provides the source of the galop's other tunes. The Banditen-Galopp was first performed in 1877.
