= Igor Zavozin =

Russian Soviet ice dancer (1955–2019)

Igor Leonidovich Zavozin (Russian: И́горь Леони́дович Заво́зин; 3 August 1955 – 29 May 2019) was a Russian Soviet ice dancer. With his former wife Elena Garanina, he represented the Soviet Union in international competition, winning the 1978 Nebelhorn Trophy and 1981 Winter Universiade, although they never made it to the World Figure Skating Championships due to the depth of the Soviet dance field. After turning pro, Garanina and Zavozin toured with Jayne Torvill and Christopher Dean. They were the parents of American ice dancer Maxim Zavozin and have since divorced. Igor Zavozin was also an international ISU judge for Armenia.

== Competitive highlights ==
(with Elena Garanina)

International
Event	1975–76	1976–77	1977–78	1978–79	1979–80	1980–81	1981–82	1982–83
Skate America							2nd	2nd
St. Ivel						2nd		
Moscow News				2nd				
Nebelhorn	2nd			1st				
Universiade						1st		
National
Soviet Champ.		5th	2nd		4th	5th	5th	6th
