= Yugoslav Figure Skating Championships =

Defunct figure skating competition

- Status: Defunct
- Genre: National championships
- Frequency: Annual
- Country: Yugoslavia
- Years active: 1947–2002
- Organizer: Skating Federation of Yugoslavia

The Yugoslav Figure Skating Championships (Croatian: Prvenstvo jugoslavije u klizanju; Serbian: Првенство Југославије у уметничком клизању) were an annual figure skating competition, organized by the Skating Federation of Yugoslavia (Serbian: Клизачког савеза Југославије) to crown the national champions of Yugoslavia. The Physical Education Association of Yugoslavia (Croatian: Fizkulturni savez Jugoslavije) organized the first Yugoslav Championships in Ljubljana in 1947.

The breakup of Yugoslavia began in 1991 with the secession of Slovenia and Croatia. Yugoslavia ceased to exist as a distinct entity in 2003 with the establishment of Serbia and Montenegro as a federal republic. Medals were awarded in men's singles, women's singles, and pair skating until the dissolution of Yugoslavia in the early 1990s. Many Yugoslav skaters went on to represent the former constituent states after their independence from Yugoslavia: Tomislav Čižmešija, Željka Čižmešija, and Zoran Marković for Croatia; Luka Klasinc and Mojca Kopač for Slovenia; and Ksenija Jastsenjski and Trifun Živanović for Serbia.

== Senior medalists ==
=== Men's singles ===
Men's event medalists
Year	Location	Gold	Silver	Bronze	Ref.
1947	Ljubljana	Emanuel Tuma			
1948	Ljubljana	Emanuel Tuma	Vlado Gross	No other competitors	
1949	Ljubljana	Emanuel Tuma	Marko Lajović	Vlado Gross	
1950	Zagreb	Marko Lajović	Jože Rešman	Vlado Gross	
1951	No competition held				
1952	Ljubljana	Marko Lajović	Jože Rešman		
1953	Celje	Jože Rešman	Miro Rozman	Mr. Amšelj	
1954	Ljubljana	Miro Rozman	Mr. Amšelj	Jože Rešman	
1955	No competition held				
1956	Ljubljana	Jože Rešman			
1957	Jesenice				
1958–59	No competitions held				
1960	Jesenice	Petar Peršin (Note: Between 1960 and 1962, Petar Peršin did not achieve the minimum required score to be named the Yugoslav champion.)	(No records found)		
1961	Jesenice	Petar Peršin	No other competitors		
1962	Ljubljana	Petar Peršin	No other competitors		
1963	Ljubljana	No men's competitors			
1964 (Note: The 1964 Yugoslav Championships were heralded as the event's 14th anniversary.)	Belgrade	Metja Šketa	(No records found)		
1965	Zagreb	Bojan Lipovčak	No other competitors		
1966	Zagreb	Bojan Lipovčak	Zoran Matas	Mr. Penčev	
1967	Ljubljana	(No records found)			
1968					
1969					
1970	Ljubljana	Zoran Matas	Silvio Švajger	(No records found)	
1971	Ljubljana	Zoran Matas	Silvio Švajger	Božidar Valešić	
1972	Ljubljana	Zoran Matas	(No records found)		
1973	Ljubljana	Silvio Švajger	Matjaž Krušec	Mladen Mumelaš	
1974	Ljubljana	Silvio Švajger	Matjaž Krušec	Mladen Mumelaš	
1975	Zagreb				
1976	Zagreb	Matjaž Krušec	Silvio Švajger	Miljan Begović	
1977	Zagreb	Matjaž Krušec	Miljan Begović	Mladen Mumelaš	
1978	Zagreb	Miljan Begović	Damir Velnić	Mr. Malivuk	
1979	Zagreb	Matjaž Krušec	Miljan Begović	Tomislav Čižmešija	
1980	Zagreb	Miljan Begović	Tomislav Čižmešija	Damir Velnić	
1981	Sarajevo	Miljan Begović	Tomislav Čižmešija	Damir Velnić	
1982	Zagreb	Miljan Begović	Tomislav Čižmešija	Damir Velnić	
1983	Zagreb	Miljan Begović	Tomislav Čižmešija	Damir Velnić	
1984	Belgrade	Miljan Begović	Tomislav Čižmešija	Mitja Vilar	
1985	Novi Sad	Tomislav Čižmešija	Mitja Vilar	Matej Pangerl	
1986	Novi Sad	Tomislav Čižmešija	David Propratnik	Matej Pangerl	
1987	Sarajevo	Tomislav Čižmešija	David Propratnik	Matej Pangerl	
1988	Zagreb	Tomislav Čižmešija	David Propratnik	Joško Cerovac	
1989	Jesenice	Tomislav Čižmešija	Joško Cerovac	Zoran Marković	
1990	Belgrade	Tomislav Čižmešija			
1991	Zagreb	Tomislav Čižmešija	Luka Klasinc	Zoran Marković	
1992	Belgrade				
1993	Belgrade				
1994	Belgrade				
1995	Belgrade				
1996	Belgrade				
1997	Belgrade	Miloš Milanović			
1998	Belgrade	Miloš Milanović			
1999	Belgrade	Miloš Milanović			
2000	Belgrade	Miloš Milanović			
2001	Belgrade	Miloš Milanović	Dimitrije Klebancuk	Andrej Maximov	
2002	Belgrade	Trifun Živanović	Miloš Milanović	No other competitors	
See Serbian Figure Skating Championships

=== Women's singles ===
Helena Pajović died on 26 December 2000, while returning to Vienna with her parents the day after winning the 2000 Yugoslav Championships. In 2001, the Serbia and Montenegro Skating Association debuted the Helena Pajović Cup – now called Skate Helena – in her memory.

Women's event medalists
Year	Location	Gold	Silver	Bronze	Ref.
1947	Ljubljana	Silva Palme	No other competitors		
1948	Ljubljana	Silva Palme	Klara Gombaš	No other competitors	
1949	Ljubljana	Silva Palme	Mara Drašler	No other competitors	
1950	Zagreb	Silva Palme	No other competitors		
1951	No competition held				
1952	Ljubljana	Silva Palme	Mara Drašler		
1953	Celje	Mara Drašlar			
1954	Ljubljana	Mara Drašlar	Ms. Benković	Ms. Gregorić	
1955	No competition held				
1956	Ljubljana	Nevenka Gala			
1957	Jesenice				
1958–59	No competitions held				
1960	Jesenice	Tjaša Andre (Note: Tjaša Andre did not achieve the minimum required score to be named the Yugoslav champion.)	(No records found)		
1961	Jesenice	Tjaša Andre	Albina Savnik	No other competitors	
1962	Ljubljana	Katjuša Derenda	Tjaša Andre	Albina Kristan	
1963	Ljubljana	Katjuša Derenda	Albina Kristan	Žhalka Šušteršić	
1964	Belgrade	Katjuša Derenda	(No records found)		
1965	Zagreb	Ms. Drnovšek	Ms. Agrež	No other competitors	
1966	Zagreb	Albina Kristan	Ms. Celan	Ms. Vikova	
1967	Ljubljana	Katjuša Derenda	(No records found)		
1968		Dunja Vujčić			
1969					
1970	Ljubljana	Helena Gazvoda	Dunja Vujčić	Jadranka Cubriković	
1971	Ljubljana	Helena Gazvoda	Ms. Leben	Z. Gazvoda	
1972	Ljubljana	Helena Gazvoda	(No records found)		
1973	Ljubljana	Helena Gazvoda			
1974	Ljubljana	Helena Gazvoda	Ms. Gačnik	Maja Župančič	
1975	Zagreb	Helena Gazvoda			
1976	Zagreb	Sanda Dubravčić	Maja Župančič	Ms. Kralj	
1977	Zagreb	Sanda Dubravčić	Maja Župančič	Natasa Katić	
1978	Zagreb	Sanda Dubravčić	Natasa Katić	Nevenka Lisak	
1979	Zagreb	Sanda Dubravčić	Nevenka Lisak	Natasa Katić	
1980	Zagreb	Sanda Dubravčić	Nevenka Lisak	Natasa Katić	
1981	Sarajevo	Sanda Dubravčić	Nevenka Lisak	Petra Malivuk	
1982	Zagreb	Sanda Dubravčić	Petra Malivuk	Nevenka Lisak	
1983	Zagreb	Željka Čižmešija	Nevenka Lisak	Sanda Dubravčić	
1984	Belgrade	Sanda Dubravčić	Nevenka Lisak	Željka Čižmešija	
1985	Novi Sad	Željka Čižmešija	Metka Hladin	Vojislava Popović	
1986	Novi Sad	Željka Čižmešija	Mateja Aubrecht	Vojislava Popović	
1987	Sarajevo	Željka Čižmešija	Mateja Aubrecht	Gabrijela Jurković	
1988	Zagreb	Željka Čižmešija	Mateja Aubrecht	Gabrijela Jurković	
1989	Jesenice	Mateja Aubrecht	Željka Čižmešija	Gabrijela Jurković	
1990	Belgrade	Željka Čižmešija	Mateja Aubrecht	Špela Perc	
1991	Zagreb	Željka Čižmešija	Melita Juratek	Mojca Kopač	
1992	Belgrade				
1993	Belgrade				
1994	Belgrade	Sandra Brajdić	Ksenija Jastsenjski		
1995	Belgrade	Ksenija Jastsenjski			
1996	Belgrade		Ksenija Jastsenjski		
1997	Belgrade				
1998	Belgrade			Ksenija Jastsenjski	
1999	Belgrade				
2000	Belgrade	Helena Pajović		Ksenija Jastsenjski	
2001	Belgrade	Helena Pajović	Ksenija Jastsenjski	Ivana Djurin	
2002	Belgrade	Ksenija Jastsenjski			
See Serbian Figure Skating Championships

=== Pairs ===
Pairs event medalists
Year	Location	Gold	Silver	Bronze	Ref.
1947	Ljubljana	No pairs competitors			
1948	Ljubljana	Silva Palme; Marko Lajović	No other competitors		
1949	Ljubljana	Silva Palme; Marko Lajović	No other competitors		
1950	Zagreb	Silva Palme; Marko Lajović	No other competitors		
1951	No competition held				
1952	Ljubljana	Silva Palme; Marko Lajović			
1953	Celje	No pairs competitors			
1954	Ljubljana	Ms. Brlec; Mr. Faidita			
1955	No competition held				
1956	Ljubljana	Nevenka Gala; Jože Rešman			
1957	Jesenice				
1958–59	No competitions held				
1960	Jesenice	Tjaša Andre; Petar Perštin	(No records found)		
1961	Jesenice	No pairs competitors			
1962	Ljubljana	No pairs competitors			
1963	Ljubljana	Katjuša Derenda; Franek Klemenc	Anka Dolenc; Metja Šketa	No other competitors	
1964	Belgrade	Anka Dolenc; Metja Šketa	(No records found)		
1965	Zagreb	Barba Senk; Peter Sprager	No other competitors		
1966	Zagreb	No pairs competitors			
1967	Ljubljana	Anka Dolenc; Metja Šketa	(No records found)		
1968		Barbka Senk; Metja Šketa			
1969					
1970	Ljubljana	Helena Gazvoda; Silvio Švajger	(No records found)		
1971	Ljubljana	Helena Gazvoda; Silvio Švajger	No other competitors		
1972–99	No pairs competitors				
2000	Belgrade	Ivana Djurin; Andrei Maximov			
2001	Belgrade	Ivana Djurin; Andrei Maximov	No other competitors		
2002					
See Serbian Figure Skating Championships

=== Ice dance ===
Ice dance event medalists
Year	Location	Gold	Silver	Bronze	Ref.
2001	Belgrade	Olga Kudimovich; Tadej Antonijevic	No other competitors		
2002	Belgrade	Marina Galic; Igor Sergeev	No other competitors		
See Serbian Figure Skating Championships
