= Ksenija Jastsenjski =

Serbian figure skater

Ksenija Jastsenjski Ксенија Јастсењски
Personal information
- Full name: Ksenia Jastsenjski
- Born: 2 September 1982 (age 44) Belgrade, Serbia
- Height: 1.70 m (5 ft 7 in)

Figure skating career
- Country: Serbia (2007–10); Serbia and Montenegro (2002–07); Yugoslavia (1992–2002)
- Discipline: Women's singles

Medal record
Representing Serbia
Serbian Championships
Gold medal – first place	2003 Belgrade	Singles
Gold medal – first place	2004 Belgrade	Singles
Gold medal – first place	2005 Belgrade	Singles
Gold medal – first place	2006 Belgrade	Singles
Gold medal – first place	2007 Belgrade	Singles
Gold medal – first place	2008 Belgrade	Singles
Representing Yugoslavia
Yugoslav Championships
Gold medal – first place	1995 Belgrade	Singles
Gold medal – first place	2002 Belgrade	Singles
Silver medal – second place	1994 Belgrade	Singles
Silver medal – second place	1996 Belgrade	Singles
Silver medal – second place	2001 Belgrade	Singles
Bronze medal – third place	1998 Belgrade	Singles
Bronze medal – third place	2000 Belgrade	Singles

Ksenija Jastsenjski (Serbian Cyrillic: Ксенија Јастсењски; born 2 September 1982 in Belgrade) is a Serbian figure skater. She is a seven-time national champion. She formerly represented Serbia and Montenegro and FR Yugoslavia.

== Competitive highlights ==
- JGP – Event of the ISU Junior Grand Prix Series
- WD – Withdrew from competition

=== Single skating (for Serbia) ===
Competition placements at senior level
Season	2002–03	2003–04	2004–05	2005–06	2006–07	2007–08	2008–09	2009–10
World Championships		37th		36th	43rd	42nd	49th	
European Championships				31st	35th	37th		
Serbian Championships	1st	1st	1st	1st	1st	1st		2nd
Golden Spin of Zagreb					18th	25th		WD
Triglav Trophy				6th				
Winter Universiade			29th		26th			

=== Single skating (for Yugoslavia) ===
Competition placements since the 1992–93 season
Season	1992–93	1993–94	1994–95	1995–96	1996–97	1997–98	1998–99	1999–2000	2000–01	2001–02
World Championships									47th	39th
European Championships										33rd
World Junior Championships			42nd				39th	45th	43rd	45th
Yugoslav Championships (Senior)	5th	2nd	1st	2nd		3rd		3rd	2nd	1st
Yugoslav Championships (Junior)					1st		1st			
JGP Bulgaria						21st				
JGP Norway									20th	
JGP Poland									25th	23rd
JGP Ukraine							18th			
European Youth Olympic Days				21st J		18th J				
Nebelhorn Trophy										27th
Sofia Cup			10th J							
