= Lisak =

Lisak is a Slavic patronymic surname derived from the given name/nickname "Lis", 'fox'. Notable people with the surname include:

- David Lisak, American psychologist
- Nevenka Lisak, Croatian competitive figure skater
