= Marina Seeh =

Serbian former figure skater (born 1986)

Marina Seeh Марина Сех
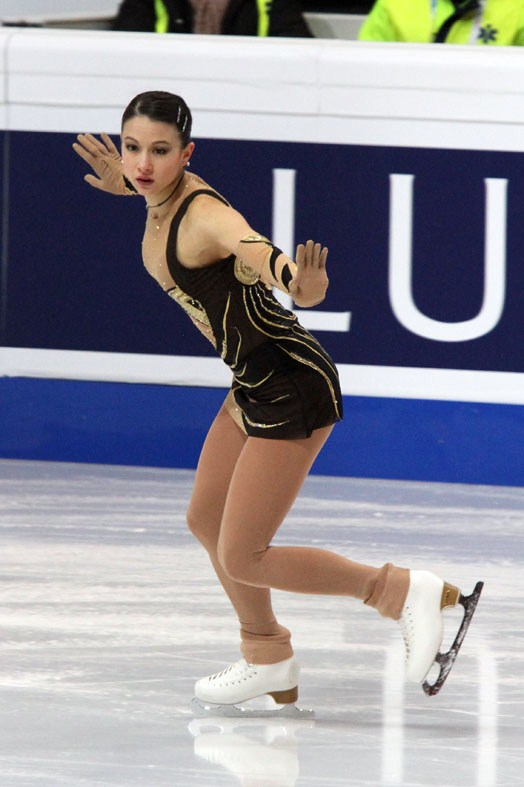
- Marina Seeh at the 2011 European Championships

Personal information
- Born: 31 July 1986 (age 39) Bergisch Gladbach, Germany
- Height: 1.63 m (5 ft 4 in)

Figure skating career
- Country: Serbia
- Discipline: Women's singles

Medal record
Serbian Championships
Gold medal – first place	2010 Belgrade	Singles
Gold medal – first place	2011 Belgrade	Singles
Silver medal – second place	2012 Belgrade	Singles
Silver medal – second place	2013 Belgrade	Singles

Marina Seeh (Serbian Cyrillic: Марина Сех; born 31 July 1986) is a Serbian former figure skater. She is a two-time (2010–2011) Serbian national champion.

== Programs ==
Season	Short program	Free skating
2012–2013	Send in the Clowns by Stephen Sondheim	W.E. by Abel Korzeniowski
2011–2012	Send in the Clowns by Stephen Sondheim	Rachmaninov
2009–2010	Adagio by Remo Giazotto, Tomaso Albinoni	Ararat by Ara Gevorgyan

== Competitive highlights ==
Competition placements at senior level
Season	2009–10	2010–11	2011–12	2012–13
World Championships	46th	43rd	49th	
European Championships	38th	33rd	40th	
Serbian Championships	1st	1st	2nd	2nd
Bavarian Open		15th		
Cup of Nice	27th			
Gardena Spring Trophy		15th	9th	
Golden Spin of Zagreb	9th		20th	17th
Merano Cup	18th			
Nebelhorn Trophy	30th		21st	18th
Ondrej Nepela Memorial			13th	17th
NRW Trophy				32nd
New Year's Cup				14th
Triglav Trophy	18th	14th		
