= Antonina Dubinina =

Russian-Serbian figure skater (born 1996)

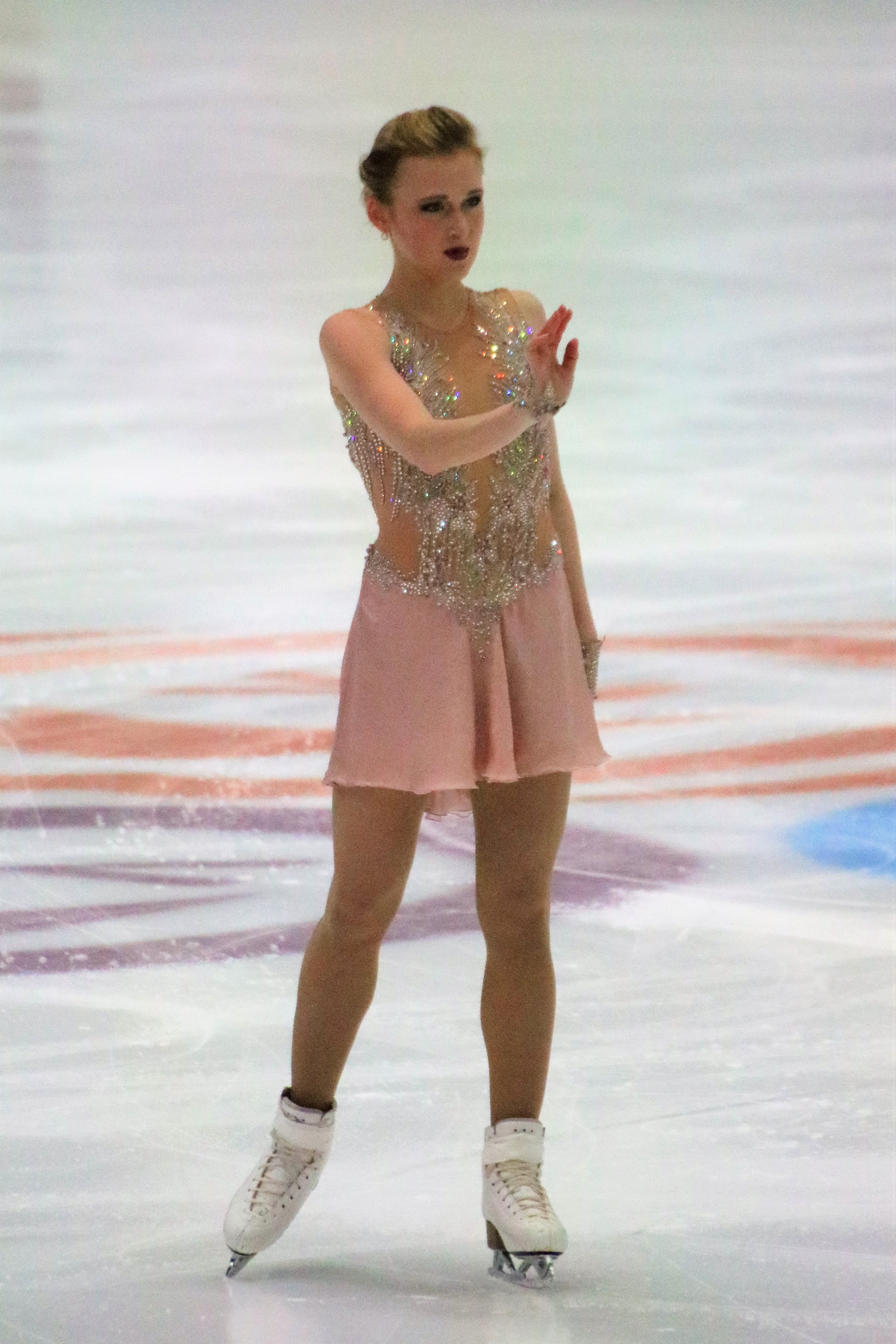
- Antonina Dubinina at the 2020 European Championships

Personal information
- Native name: Антонина Дубинина (Russian)
- Born: 23 October 1996 (age 29) Moscow, Russia
- Home town: Belgrade, Serbia & Moscow, Russia
- Height: 1.66 m (5 ft 5 1/2 in)

Figure skating career
- Country: Serbia (since 2015); Russia (2013–14)
- Discipline: Women's singles
- Coach: Maria Butyrskaya
- Began skating: 2001

Medal record
Serbian Championships
Gold medal – first place	2016 Belgrade	Singles
Gold medal – first place	2017 Belgrade	Singles
Gold medal – first place	2018 Belgrade	Singles
Gold medal – first place	2019 Belgrade	Singles
Gold medal – first place	2020 Belgrade	Singles
Gold medal – first place	2022 Belgrade	Singles

Antonina Dubinina (Serbian Cyrillic: Антонина Дубинина; born 23 October 1996) is a Russian-Serbian figure skater who competes in women's singles. She is the 2019 Skate Helena champion, a six-time Serbian national champion, and competed in the final segment of the 2019 European Championships.

== Personal life ==
Dubinina was born on 23 October 1996 in Moscow, Russia. As of January 2019. She has a master's degree in Physical Education and Sport.

== Career ==
=== Early years ===
Dubinina began learning to skate in 2001 as a five-year-old. As a child, she was taught by Galina Savchenkova at the Central Youth Theater in Mytishchi, a suburb of Moscow. She represented Russia in the senior ranks at three international competitions in February and March 2014.

=== Career for Serbia ===
Dubinina made her senior international debut for Serbia at the CS Lombardia Trophy in September 2016. Coached by Svetlana Sokolovskaia at CSKA Moscow, she placed 29th in the short program at the 2017 European Championships in Ostrava, Czech Republic. She also missed qualifying for the free skate at the 2018 European Championships in Moscow, Russia, and at the 2018 World Championships in Milan, Italy.

Coached by Sokolovskaia and Stanislav Zakharov, Dubinina advanced to the final segment at the 2019 European Championships in Minsk, Belarus.

== Programs ==
Season	Short program	Free skating
2025–2026	My Sweet and Tender Beast (from A Hunting Accident) by Eugen Doga choreo. by Maria Butyrskaya, Viktor Adoniev	Twilight Huntress by Eternal Eclipse ft. Merethe Soltvedt; Rise Like a Phoenix by Conchita Wurst; Redemption by Eternal Eclipse choreo. by Maria Butyrskaya, Viktor Adoniev
2024–2025	Proud by Tamara Todevska choreo. by Maria Butyrskaya	Twiling Huntress by Eternal Eclipse ft. Merethe Soltvedt; Rise Like a Phoenix by Conchita Wurst; Redemption by Eternal Eclipse choreo. by Viktor Adoniev
2023–2024	Proud by Tamara Todevska choreo. by Maria Butyrskaya	The Voice of Enigma by Enigma; La terre vue du cuel by Armand Amar choreo. by Artem Fedorchenko
2022–2023	Perfidia by Alberto Domínguez performed by John Altman; La Percussion by Watazu; Mujer Latina by Thalía choreo. by Artem Fedorchenko	The Voice of Enigma by Enigma; La terre vue du cuel by Armand Amar choreo. by Artem Fedorchenko
2021–2022	Malagueña by Ernesto Lecuona performed by Connie Francis	Prelude - Age of Heroes; Ad Martem by Balázs Havasi
2020–2021	A Moment Like This by Kelly Clarkson performed by Leona Lewis	My Life is Tango by Voga Experience
2019–2020	Strange Birds by Birdy	My Life is Tango by Voga Experience
2018–2019	Nur für dich performed by Mireille Mathieu	Survivor (from Tomb Raider) performed by 2WEI
2017–2018	Tango Princess by Julie Zenatti	Hijo de la Luna (rock cover)
2016–2017	Modern Tango	The Winner Takes It All by ABBA

== Competitive highlights ==
- CS – Event of the ISU Challenger Series
- TBD – Assigned
- WD – Withdrew from competition

=== Single skating (for Serbia) ===
Competition placements at senior level
Season	2015–16	2016–17	2017–18	2018–19	2019–20	2020–21	2021–22	2022–23	2023–24	2024–25	2025–26
World Championships			36th								
European Championships		29th	37th	24th	31st		28th	27th	31st	25th	27th
Serbian Championships	1st	1st	1st	1st	1st			1st			
CS Budapest Trophy						11th					
CS Denis Ten Memorial								8th	13th	14th	
CS Finlandia Trophy				22nd					18th		
CS Golden Spin of Zagreb		14th		18th	17th		21st				
CS Lombardia Trophy		17th	20th	16th			24th				
CS Nebelhorn Trophy			23rd				26th				
CS Nepela Memorial								14th			
CS Tallinn Trophy			22nd				8th				
CS Warsaw Cup		13th		11th						20th	
Abu Dhabi Classic Trophy								3rd			
Asian Open Trophy											7th
Bavarian Open		12th		13th	11th						
Bellu Memorial							4th				
Bosphorus Cup					4th			8th		5th	4th
Challenge Cup					20th						
Crystal Skate of Romania				4th						4th	
Cup of Tyrol		12th									
Denkova-Staviski Cup		4th								12th	
Dragon Trophy								12th			
EduSport Trophy										3rd	
EDGE Cup											5th
Golden Bear of Zagreb		13th									
Ice Star				14th							
Jégvirág Cup				4th							
Kaunas Ice Cup			3rd								
Mentor Cup		14th	5th	6th	13th						
Santa Claus Cup			9th			7th					
Sarajevo Open			6th								
Skate Celje							6th	5th		8th	
Skate Fehervar											3rd
Skate Helena		7th		1st	5th	1st	5th	2nd	4th		
Skate to Milano											20th
Slovenia Open			11th								
Sofia Trophy		9th				4th	6th				
Spring Talents Cup						2nd					
Tallink Hotels Cup				5th	10th						9th
Tirnavia Ice Cup							7th				
Triglav Trophy							5th				
Trophée Métropole Nice						10th					
Volvo Open Cup		5th	5th	17th				11th			
Winter Star						4th	4th				

=== Single skating (for Russia) ===
Competition placements at senior level
Season	2013–14
Bavarian Open	7th
Gardena Spring Trophy	7th
Hellmut Seibt Memorial	9th

== Detailed results ==
ISU personal best scores in the +5/-5 GOE System
Segment	Type	Score	Event
Total	TSS	134.58	2019 CS Golden Spin of Zagreb
Short program	TSS	50.47	2018 CS Golden Spin of Zagreb
Short program	TES	26.31	2018 CS Golden Spin of Zagreb
Short program	PCS	24.16	2018 CS Golden Spin of Zagreb
Free skating	TSS	86.36	2019 CS Golden Spin of Zagreb
Free skating	TES	42.48	2019 CS Golden Spin of Zagreb
Free skating	PCS	44.88	2019 CS Golden Spin of Zagreb

Results in the 2025–26 season
Date	Event	SP		FS		Total	
Date	Event	P	Score	P	Score	P	Score
Aug 1–5, 2025	(Philippines) 2025 Asian Open Trophy	7	38.60	7	77.24	7	115.84
Sep 18–21, 2025	(China) 2025 Skate to Milano	17	43.59	20	78.82	20	122.41
Nov 24–30, 2025	(Turkey) 2025 Bosphorus Cup	8	49.43	3	95.84	4	145.27
Dec 4–7, 2025	(Hungary) 2025 Skate Fehervar	3	50.19	4	91.12	3	141.31
Jan 1–18, 2026	(United Kingdom) 2026 European Championships	27	49.56	—N/a	—N/a	27	49.56
27 Jan – 1 Feb 2026	(Poland) 2026 EDGE Cup	6	46.60	4	90.02	5	136.62
Feb 19-22, 2026	(Estonia) 2026 Tallink Hotels Cup	10	50.47	10	94.31	9	144.78
