= Serbian Figure Skating Championships =

Recurring figure skating competition

- Status: Active
- Genre: National championships
- Frequency: Annual
- Country: Serbia and Montenegro (2003–06); Serbia (since 2006)
- Inaugurated: 2003
- Organizer: Serbia and Montenegro Skating Association (2003–06); Serbian Skating Association (since 2006)

The Serbian Figure Skating Championships (Serbian: Првенство Србије у уметничком клизању, romanized: Prvenstvo Srbije u umetničkom klizanju) are an annual figure skating competition, organized by the Serbian Skating Association (Serbian: Клизачки савез Србије) to crown the national champions of Serbia. The breakup of Yugoslavia began in 1991 with the secession of Slovenia and Croatia. Yugoslavia ceased to exist as a distinct entity in 2003 with the establishment of Serbia and Montenegro as a federal republic. In June 2006, Montenegro split from Serbia, leading to the establishment of two distinct nations. Skaters compete in men's singles, women's singles, and ice dance, although each discipline may not necessarily be held every year due to a lack of participants.

== Senior medalists ==
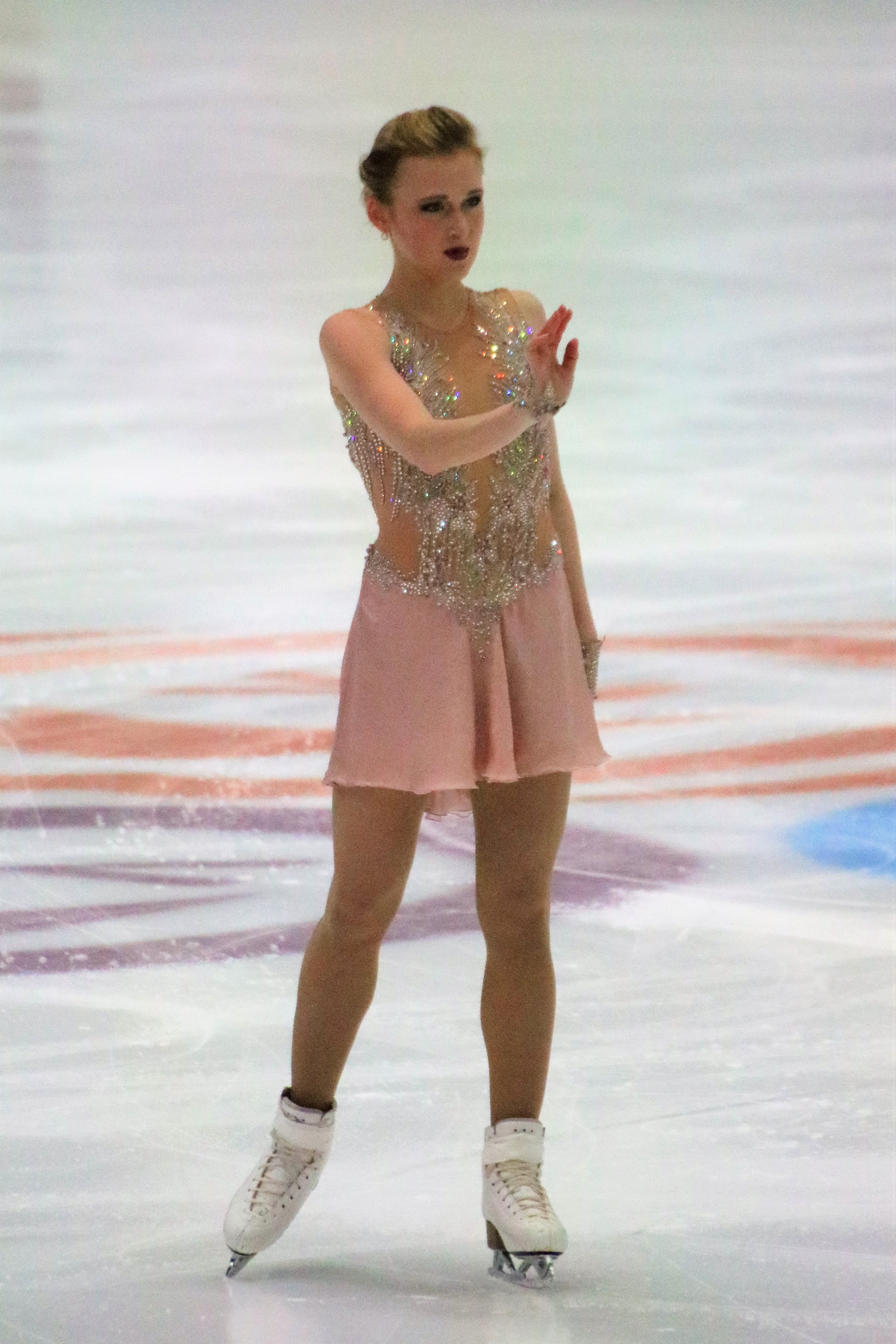
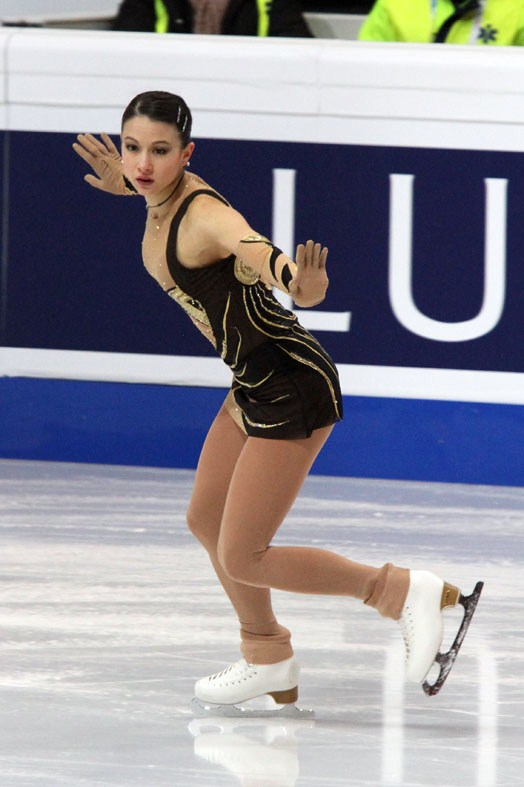
Serbia has produced many international figure skaters, including (from left to right): Antonina Dubinina and Marina Seeh.

=== Men's singles ===
Trifun Živanović, five-time Serbian national champion, won the gold medal at the 2002 Yugoslav Figure Skating Championships.

Senior men's event medalists
Year	Location	Gold	Silver	Bronze	Ref.
2003	Belgrade	Trifun Živanović	No other competitors		
2004	Belgrade	Trifun Živanović	No other competitors		
2005	Belgrade	Trifun Živanović	No other competitors		
2006	Belgrade	Trifun Živanović	No other competitors		
2007		Trifun Živanović	No other competitors		
2008–24	No men's competitors				
2025	Belgrade	Danial Ibragimov (Russia)	No other competitors		

=== Women's singles ===
Ksenija Jastsenjski, six-time Serbian champion, was also a two-time Yugoslav national champion.

Senior women's event medalists
Year	Location	Gold	Silver	Bronze	Ref.
2003	Belgrade	Ksenija Jastsenjski	No other competitors		
2004	Belgrade	Ksenija Jastsenjski	Kristel Popović	Neda Raković	
2005	Belgrade	Ksenija Jastsenjski	Jovana Nikolić	Sonja Mugoša	
2006	Belgrade	Ksenija Jastsenjski	Neda Raković	Sonja Mugoša	
2007		Ksenija Jastsenjski	Neda Raković	Sonja Mugoša	
2008	Novi Sad	Ksenija Jastsenjski	Marina Seeh	No other competitors	
2009		Marina Seeh	No other competitors		
2010		Marina Seeh	Ksenija Jastsenjski	Mila Petrović	
2011		Marina Seeh	Sandra Ristivojević	Jana Stojanović	
2012	Belgrade	Sandra Ristivojević	Marina Seeh	Mila Petrović	
2013	Belgrade	Sandra Ristivojević	Marina Seeh	Mila Petrović	
2014	Belgrade	Sandra Ristivojević	No other competitors		
2015	Belgrade	Antonina Dubinina	Sandra Ristivojević	No other competitors	
2016	Belgrade	Antonina Dubinina	Jovana Tomovic	No other competitors	
2017	Belgrade	Antonina Dubinina	No other competitors		
2018	Belgrade	Antonina Dubinina	No other competitors		
2019	Belgrade	Antonina Dubinina	Zona Apostolović	No other competitors	
2020	Belgrade	Antonina Dubinina	Leona Rogić	Zona Apostolović	
2021	Belgrade	Leona Rogić	Nevena Mihajlović	Zona Apostolović	
2022	Belgrade	Zona Apostolović	No other competitors		
2023	Belgrade	Antonina Dubinina	No other competitors		
2024	Belgrade	Marija Kryzova	No other competitors		
2025	Belgrade	Marija Kryzova	No other competitors		

=== Ice dance ===
Senior ice dance event medalists
Year	Location	Gold	Silver	Bronze	Ref.
2003	Belgrade	Marina Galić; Ivan Manvelov	Olga Kudimovich; Antonije Terescenkov	No other competitors	
2004	Belgrade	Sara Sajić; Denis Beznar	No other competitors		
2005		Sara Sajić; Denis Beznar	No other competitors		
2007		Sara Sajić; Denis Beznar	No other competitors		
No ice dance competitors since 2007

== Junior medalists ==
=== Women's singles ===
Junior women's event medalists
Year	Location	Gold	Silver	Bronze	Ref.
2012	Belgrade	Katarina Knezević	Jovana Tomović	Jelena Tadić	
2013	Belgrade	Katarina Knezević	Jovana Tomović	No other competitors	
2014	Belgrade	Milica Jokić	Jovana Tomović	No other competitors	
2015	Belgrade	Jovana Tomović	Milica Jokić	Anja Sainović	
2016	Belgrade	Andjela Miljević	Zona Apostolović	Anja Sainović	
2017	Belgrade	Leona Rogić	Andjela Miljević	Zona Apostolović	
2018	Belgrade	Leona Rogić	Nevena Mihajlović	Zona Apostolović	
2019	Belgrade	Leona Rogić	Nevena Mihajlović	Nadja Tresnjić	
2020	Belgrade	Darja Mijatović	Sara Celanović	Nevena Mihajlović	
2021	Belgrade	Danica Djordjević	Darja Mijatović	Ivona Kleut	
2022	Belgrade	Darja Mijatović	Danica Djordjević	Ivona Kleut	
2023	Belgrade	Ivona Kleut	Ana Scepanović	Mia Milinković	
2024	Belgrade	Ana Scepanović	Dunja Tresnjić	Mia Milinković	
2025	Belgrade	Ekaterina Balaganskaya (Russia)	Dunja Tresnjić	Arina Ryabicheva (Russia)	
