= Sanda Dubravčić =

Croatian figure skater

Personal information
- Full name: Sanda Dubravčić-Šimunjak
- Born: 24 August 1964 (age 61) Zagreb, SR Croatia, SFR Yugoslavia

Figure skating career
- Country: Yugoslavia
- Skating club: KKK Medveščak Zagreb
- Retired: 1984
Medal record
Representing Yugoslavia
Figure skating: Ladies' singles
European Championships
Silver medal – second place	1981 Innsbruck	Ladies' singles

Sanda Dubravčić-Šimunjak (born 24 August 1964) is a Croatian physician and former figure skater who competed internationally for Yugoslavia. She is the 1981 European silver medalist.

== Personal life ==
Sanda Dubravčić was born on 24 August 1964 in Zagreb, SR Croatia, Yugoslavia, to Zora (née Lipošćak) and Dragutin Dubravčić. She is a medical doctor and married Boris Šimunjak in 1991.

== Career ==
In 1976, Dubravčić finished seventh at the inaugural World Junior Championships, held in Megève, France. Her senior ISU Championship debut came at the 1977 Europeans in Helsinki, Finland.

Dubravčić represented Yugoslavia at the 1980 Winter Olympics in Lake Placid, New York; she finished 11th overall after placing 13th in compulsory figures, tenth in the short program, and eighth in the free skate. At the 1981 European Championships in Innsbruck, she ranked fifth in figures and second in the next two segments. She was awarded the silver medal, having finished between Denise Biellmann of Switzerland and Claudia Kristofics-Binder of Austria.

Dubravčić was the final Olympic torchbearer at the 1984 Winter Olympics in Sarajevo. She ended up tenth overall after placing eighth in figures, ninth in the short, and ninth in the free. Concluding her career, she finished ninth at the 1984 World Championships in Ottawa, Canada.

Dubravčić has served as an international judge and as a member of the ISU Council's medical commission.

== Competitive highlights ==
International
Event	75–76	76–77	77–78	78–79	79–80	80–81	81–82	82–83	83–84
Olympics					11th				10th
Worlds				12th	12th	11th	14th	13th	9th
Europeans		16th	16th	7th	5th	2nd	WD	10th	5th
NHK Trophy								12th	
Golden Spin		3rd	1st			1st	1st	1st	1st
Prague Skate			4th						
International: Junior
Junior Worlds	7th								
National
Yugoslav	1st	1st		1st	1st	1st	1st	3rd	1st

Awards
Preceded by Štefica Krištof	Yugoslav Sportswoman of the Year; 1981	Succeeded by Biserka Perman
Olympic Games
Preceded by Sergei Belov	Final Olympic torchbearer Moscow 1980	Succeeded by Rafer Johnson
Preceded by Charles Gugino	Final Winter Olympic torchbearer Sarajevo 1984	Succeeded by Robyn Perry
