= Miljan Begović =

Croatian figure skater

Personal information
- Born: 19 May 1964 (age 62) Zagreb, SR Croatia, SFR Yugoslavia
- Height: 1.80 m (5 ft 11 in)

Figure skating career
- Country: Yugoslavia
- Retired: 1986

Miljan Begović (born 19 May 1964) is a Croatian former competitive figure skater. He represented Yugoslavia at the 1984 Winter Olympics in Sarajevo and finished 21st. Begović was also selected for six World Championships (best result: 16th in 1983) and five European Championships (best result: 14th in 1983 and 1984). He won a bronze medal at the 1982 Golden Spin of Zagreb.

== Competitive highlights ==
International
Event	75–76	76–77	77–78	78–79	79–80	80–81	81–82	82–83	83–84	84–85	85–86
Olympics									21st		
Worlds					21st	WD	25th	16th	19th		25th
Europeans					18th	19th	15th	14th	14th		
Golden Spin								3rd			
International: Junior
Junior Worlds	17th										
National
Yugoslav	3rd	2nd		2nd	1st	1st	1st	1st	1st		
