= Željka Čižmešija =

Croatian figure skater

Personal information
- Born: 19 October 1970 (age 55) Zagreb, SR Croatia, SFR Yugoslavia

Figure skating career
- Country: Croatia; SFR Yugoslavia
- Retired: 1992

Željka Čižmešija (born 19 October 1970) is a Croatian retired figure skater. She placed as high as 11th at the European Championships (1987, 1989) and competed at two Winter Olympics (1988, 1992). She was the first woman to represent Croatia at the Olympics.

== Career ==
Čižmešija began appearing internationally for SFR Yugoslavia in the 1980s. She finished 13th at the 1984 World Junior Championships. In 1986, she made her first appearances at senior-level ISU (International Skating Union) Championships, placing 16th at Europeans and 21st at Worlds.

The following season, Čižmešija finished 11th at the 1987 European Championships in Sarajevo and 16th at the 1987 World Championships in Cincinnati. She placed 22nd at the 1988 Winter Olympics in Calgary, Canada. She had another 11th-place finish at the 1989 European Championships in Birmingham, England.

On 7 March 1990, at the 1990 World Championships, Čižmešija became the last skater to perform a compulsory figure in international competition (David Liu having previously become the last male skater to do it). Both she and Liu received certificates for it.

In her final season, Čižmešija represented Croatia. Training was difficult due to the war and lack of ice. She placed 25th at the 1992 Winter Olympics in Albertville, France. She retired from competition at the end of the season.

== Personal life ==
Željka Čižmešija is the sister of Tomislav Čižmešija, who competed in men's singles for Croatia at the 1992 Olympics.

== Results ==
International
Event	82-83 (YUG)	83–84 (YUG)	84–85 (YUG)	85–86 (YUG)	86–87 (YUG)	87–88 (YUG)	88–89 (YUG)	89–90 (YUG)	90–91 (YUG)	91–92 (CRO)
Olympics						22nd				25th
Worlds				21st	16th	22nd	17th	18th	28th	32nd
Europeans				16th	11th	17th	11th	13th	18th	
Skate America					10th					
Golden Spin					3rd					
International: Junior
Junior Worlds	12th	13th	14th	16th						
National
Yugoslav Champ	1st	3rd	1st	1st	1st	1st	2nd	1st	1st	
Croatian Champ										1st
