= Golden Spin of Zagreb =

International figure skating competition

- Status: Active
- Genre: ISU Challenger Series
- Frequency: Annual
- Venue: Klizalište Velesajam; Zagreb Fair
- Location: Zagreb
- Country: Yugoslavia (1967–90); Croatia (since 1992)
- Inaugurated: 1967
- Previous event: 2025 Golden Spin of Zagreb
- Next event: 2026 Golden Spin of Zagreb
- Organizer: Croatian Skating Federation

The Golden Spin of Zagreb (Croatian: Zlatna pirueta Zagreba) is an annual figure skating competition sanctioned by the International Skating Union (ISU), organized and hosted by the Croatian Skating Federation (Croatian: Hrvatski klizački savez) at the Klizalište Velesajam in Zagreb, Croatia. The competition debuted in 1967 when Croatia was part of Yugoslavia. It was suspended in 1991 owing to the Croatian War of Independence, but continued as a Croatian event beginning in 1992. When the ISU launched the Challenger Series in 2014, the Golden Spin of Zagreb was one of the inaugural competitions. It has been a Challenger Series event every year since, except for 2020, when it was cancelled due to the COVID-19 pandemic. Medals are awarded in men's singles, women's singles, pair skating, and ice dance; and as part of the Challenger Series, skaters earn points towards the World Standings and Season's World Ranking based on their results.

László Vajda of Hungary holds the record for winning the most Golden Spin of Zagreb titles in men's singles (with four), while Sanda Dubravčić of Yugoslavia holds the record in women's singles (with five). Three teams are tied for winning the most titles in pair skating (with two each): Sabine Baeß and Tassilo Thierbach of East Germany, Cornelia Haufe and Kersten Bellmann of East Germany, and Anastasia Martiusheva and Alexei Rogonov of Russia; Rogonov also won an additional title with a different partner. Charlène Guignard and Marco Fabbri of Italy hold the record in ice dance (with four).

== History ==
The first installment of the Golden Spin of Zagreb – originally called the Zagreb International Figure Skating Championship (Croatian: Međunarodno prvenstvo Zagreba u umjetničkom klizanju) – was held in 1967 in Šalata, a neighborhood of Zagreb, in what was at the time Yugoslavia. The competition featured skaters from Austria, Czechoslovakia, Romania, Bulgaria, and Yugoslavia. The competition adopted the name "Golden Spin" (Croatian: Zlatna pirueta) in 1971. The breakup of Yugoslavia began with the secession of Slovenia and Croatia in June 1991, and no competition was held that year owing to the Croatian War of Independence. Despite some hesitation, the Croatian government was adamant that the Golden Spin of Zagreb be held in 1992, even while Croatia experienced intermittent combat with Yugoslavia. In addition to its jubilee status as the event's 25th anniversary, 1992 also marked the 750th anniversary of the establishment of Zagreb as a free royal city. Organizers hoped the competition would help dispel international perceptions of potential danger in travel to Croatia. While some nations declined to send athletes, the competition was held in 1992, and every year thereafter, except for 2020, when it was cancelled due to the COVID-19 pandemic. In 2001, the Golden Spin of Zagreb served as the qualifying competition for the 2002 Winter Olympics.

The Challenger Series was introduced in 2014. It is a series of international figure skating competitions sanctioned by the International Skating Union (ISU) and organized by ISU member nations. Its objective is to ensure consistent organization and structure within a series of international competitions linked together, providing opportunities for senior-level skaters to compete at the international level and also earn points towards the World Standings and Season's World Ranking. The 2014 Golden Spin of Zagreb was one of the inaugural competitions. When an event is held as part of the Challenger Series, it must host at least three of the four disciplines (men's singles, women's singles, pair skating, and ice dance) and representatives from at least ten different ISU member nations. The minimum number of entrants required for each discipline is eight skaters each in men's singles and women's singles, five teams in pair skating, and six teams in ice dance. Each ISU member nation is eligible to enter up to three skaters or teams per discipline in each competition, although the Croatian Skating Federation may enter an unlimited number of entrants in their own event.

In February 2016, the ISU declared that the Nebelhorn Trophy, the Finlandia Trophy, the Ondrej Nepela Trophy, and the Golden Spin of Zagreb would constitute a core group of Challenger Series events in recognition of their long-standing tradition. In April 2026, the ISU again announced that the Golden Spin of Zagreb would again be included in a core group of Challenger Series events, along with the Nebelhorn Trophy, the Nepela Memorial, and one competition from either Canada or the United States. The Golden Spin of Zagreb has been a Challenger Series event every year since the series' inception, except for 2020, when the event was cancelled. The 2026 Golden Spin of Zagreb is scheduled to be held from 2 to 5 December in Zagreb.

== Senior medalists ==
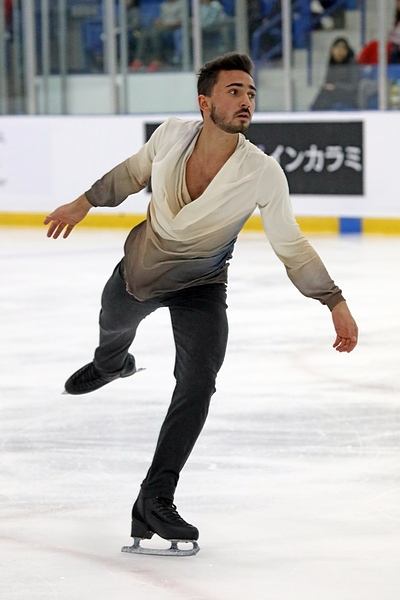
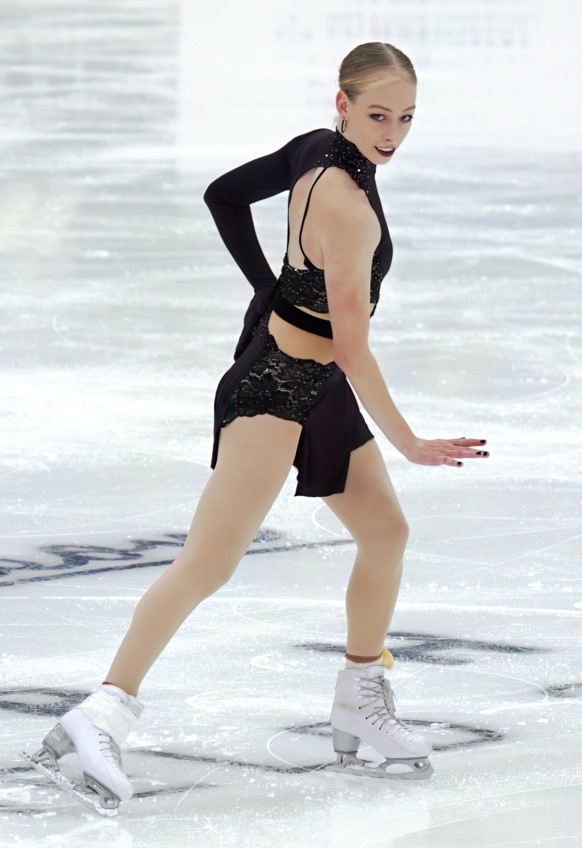
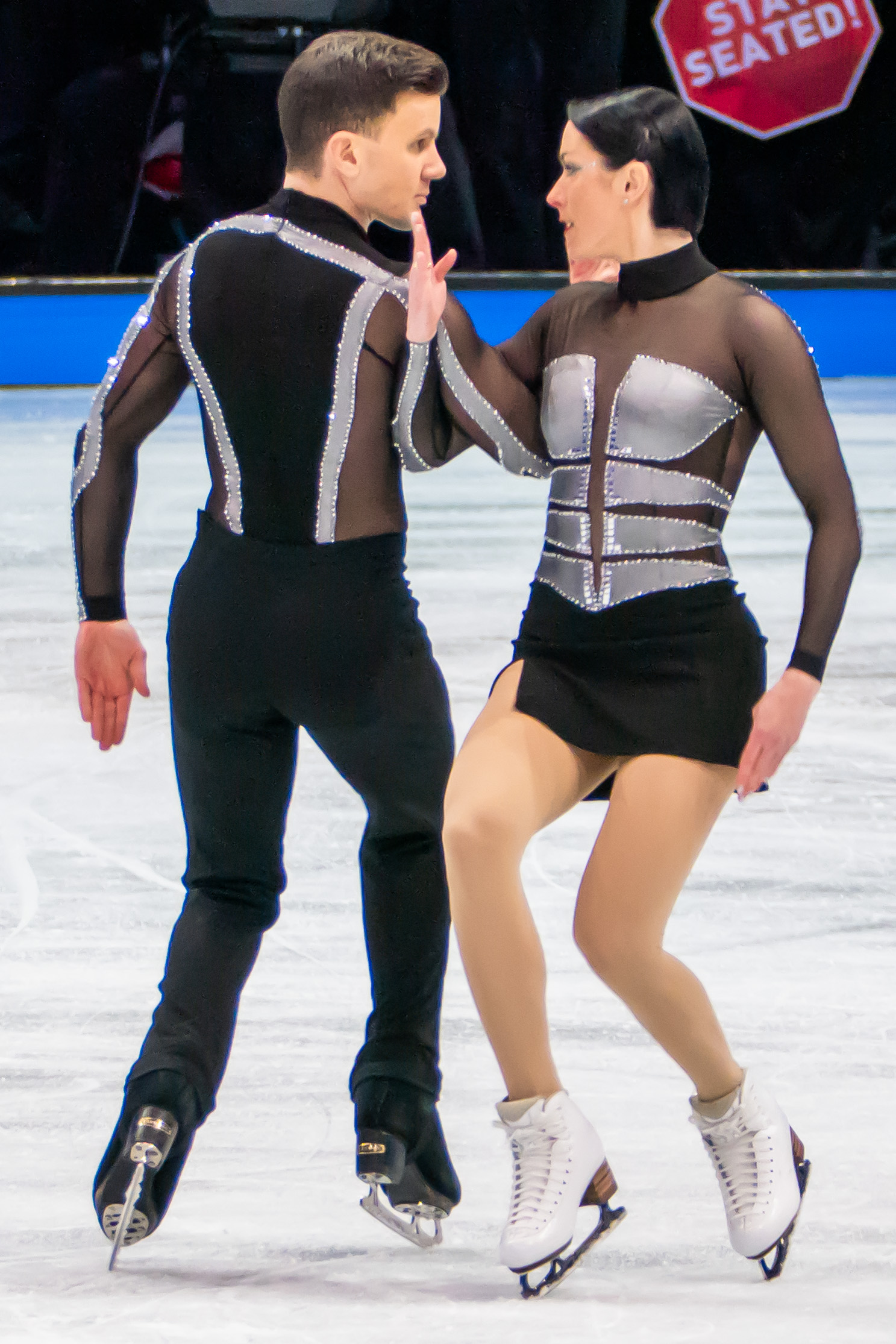
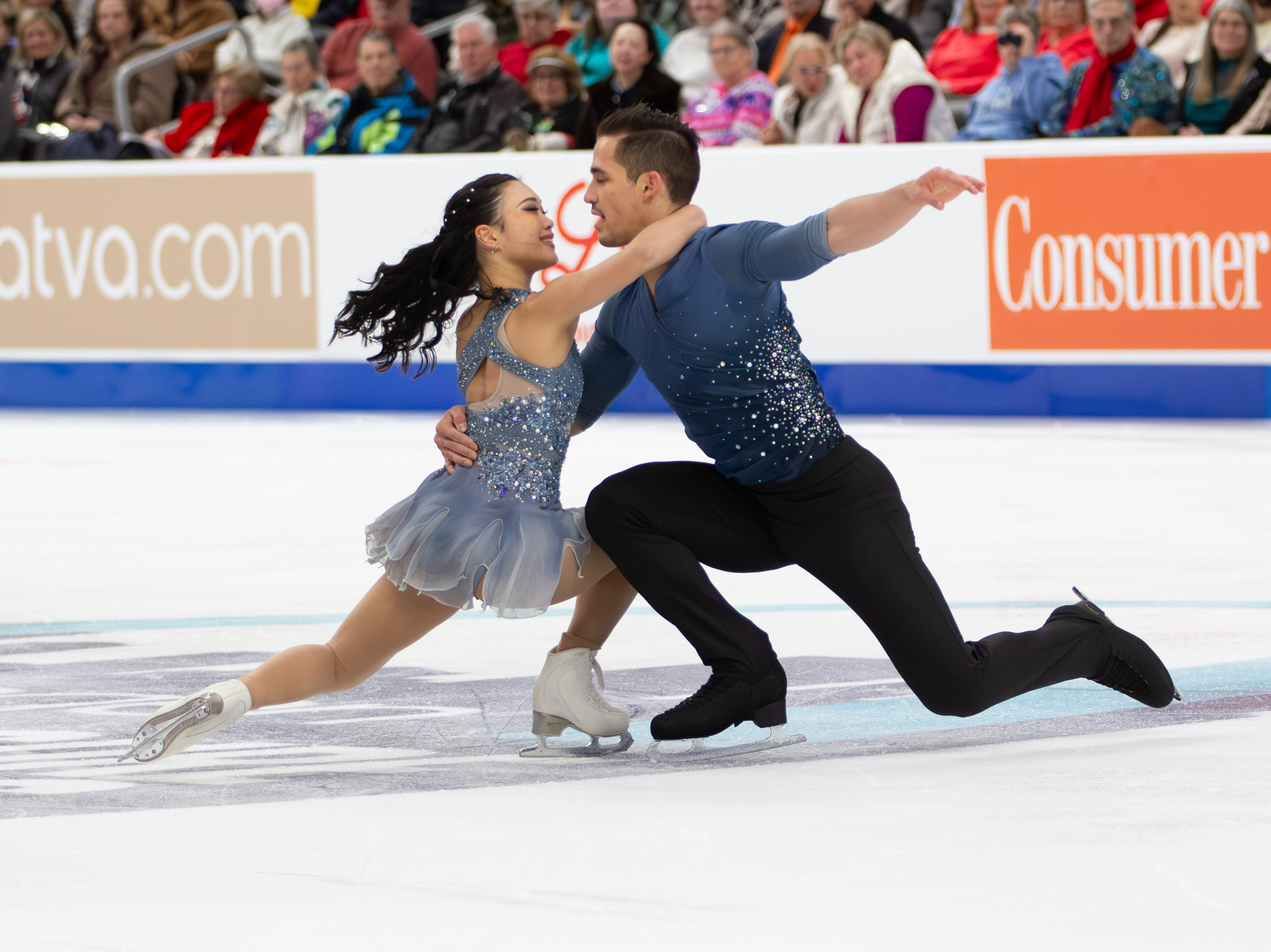
The 2025 Golden Spin of Zagreb champions (from left to right): Kévin Aymoz of France (men's singles); Bradie Tennell of the United States (women's singles); Charlène Guignard and Marco Fabbri of Italy (ice dance); and Audrey Shin and Balázs Nagy of the United States (pair skating)

CS: Challenger Series event

=== Men's singles ===
Men's event medalists
Year	Gold	Silver	Bronze	Ref.
1967	(Austria) Günter Anderl	(Austria) Josef Schneider	(Czechoslovakia) Petr Starec	
1968	(East Germany) Günter Zöller	(West Germany) Klaus Grimmelt	(Austria) Günter Anderl	
1969	(Hungary) Zoltán Horváth	(Poland) Janusz Czakon	(Italy) Stefano Bargauan	
1970	(Switzerland) Daniel Höner	(Hungary) László Vajda	(East Germany) Michael Glaubitz	
1971	(Hungary) László Vajda	(Czechoslovakia) Mr. Masek	(East Germany) Michael Glaubitz	
1972	(Hungary) László Vajda	(East Germany) Michael Glaubitz	(West Germany) Rudi Cerne	
1973	(Soviet Union) Sergey Volkov	(Czechoslovakia) Zdeněk Pazdírek	(France) Didier Gailhaguet	
1974	(Hungary) László Vajda	(Soviet Union) Alexander Majorov	(France) Christophe Boyadjian	
1975	(Hungary) László Vajda	(Soviet Union) Alexander Majorov	(Czechoslovakia) Miroslav Šoška	
1976	(Czechoslovakia) František Pechar	(Soviet Union) Igor Lisovsky	(Austria) Gerhard Haubmann	
1977	(West Germany) Gert-Walter Gräbner	(Austria) Gerhard Haubmann	(East Germany) Torsten Ohlow	
1978	(France) Jean-Christoph Simond	(Austria) Helmut Kristofics-Binder	(Hungary) László Vajda	
1979	(West Germany) Rudi Cerne	(United States) Reggie Raiford	(Austria) Helmut Kristofics-Binder	
1980	(France) Hervé Pornet	(East Germany) Ralf Lewandowski	(United States) James Santee	
1981	(United States) James Santee	(East Germany) Ralf Lewandowski	(France) Hervé Pornet	
1982	(Japan) Masaru Ogawa	(West Germany) Joachim Ehmann	(Socialist Federal Republic of Yugoslavia) Miljan Begović	
1983	(United States) Scott Hamilton	(West Germany) Norbert Schramm	(Japan) Makato Kano	
1984	(United States) Scott Williams	(Poland) Grzegorz Filipowski	(France) Fernand Fedronic	
1985	(West Germany) Heiko Fischer	(United States) John Filbig	(East Germany) Nils Köpp	
1986	(Soviet Union) Viktor Petrenko	(France) Philippe Roncoli	(United States) James Cygan	
1987	(United States) Scott Kurttila	(Australia) Cameron Medhurst	(Canada) Martin Marceau	
1988	(East Germany) Riko Krahnert	(Hungary) András Száraz	(Canada) Norm Proft	
1989	(Soviet Union) Sergei Dudakov	(United States) Craig Heath	(Sweden) Peter Johansson	
1990	(United States) Aren Nielsen	(Austria) Ralph Burghart	(Soviet Union) Igor Pashkevich	
1991	Competition cancelled due to the Croatian War of Independence			
1992	(France) Axel Médéric	(Croatia) Tomislav Čižmešija	(Romania) Luis Taifas	
1993	(France) Rodolphe Marechal	(Slovakia) Rastislav Vnučko	(France) Mr. Roublin	
1994	(Hungary) Zsolt Kerekes	(Russia) Igor Sinyutin	(Slovakia) Rastislav Vnučko	
1995	(Romania) Marius Negrea	(Slovenia) Jan Čejvan	(France) Terrence Besnier	
1996	(Russia) Roman Serov	(Hungary) Szabolcs Vidrai	(Australia) Anthony Liu	
1997	(Russia) Roman Serov	(United States) Trifun Živanović	(Hungary) Szabolcs Vidrai	
1998	(Ukraine) Yevgeny Martynov	(Azerbaijan) Sergei Rylov	(Germany) Stefan Lindemann	
1999	(Russia) Roman Serov	(Azerbaijan) Sergei Rylov	(France) Gabriel Monnier	
2000	(United States) Ryan Bradley	(Azerbaijan) Sergei Rylov	(Finland) Markus Leminen	
2001	(Belarus) Sergei Davydov	(Belgium) Kevin van der Perren	(Georgia (country)) Vakhtang Murvanidze	
2002	(Romania) Gheorghe Chiper	(Russia) Alexei Vasilevski	(United States) Benjamin Miller	
2003	(China) Ma Xiaodong	(Hungary) Zoltán Tóth	(Israel) Roman Serov	
2004	(Canada) Hugh Yik	(Germany) Martin Liebers	(Ukraine) Anton Kovalevski	
2005	(Slovenia) Gregor Urbas	(Canada) Marc-André Craig	(Russia) Ilia Klimkin	
2006	(Slovenia) Gregor Urbas	(Russia) Denis Leushin	(Germany) Martin Liebers	
2007	(Slovenia) Gregor Urbas	(Sweden) Adrian Schultheiss	(Russia) Vladimir Uspenski	
2008	(Japan) Yasuharu Nanri	(Italy) Samuel Contesti	(Sweden) Alexander Majorov	
2009	(Kazakhstan) Denis Ten	(Russia) Artem Borodulin	(Sweden) Adrian Schultheiss	
2010	(Russia) Denis Leushin	(Czech Republic) Michal Březina	(Ukraine) Anton Kovalevski	
2011	(Japan) Tatsuki Machida	(Kazakhstan) Denis Ten	(Russia) Ivan Bariev	
2012	(Russia) Vladislav Sesganov	(Russia) Mark Shakhmatov	(Denmark) Justus Strid	
2013	(Russia) Sergei Voronov	(Russia) Artur Gachinski	(Italy) Ivan Righini	
2014 CS	(Kazakhstan) Denis Ten	(Czech Republic) Michal Březina	(Russia) Konstantin Menshov	
2015 CS	(Kazakhstan) Denis Ten	(United States) Adam Rippon	(Russia) Adian Pitkeev	
2016 CS	(Israel) Alexei Bychenko	(Israel) Daniel Samohin	(Canada) Keegan Messing	
2017 CS	(Georgia (country)) Morisi Kvitelashvili	(Israel) Alexei Bychenko	(Russia) Artur Dmitriev Jr.	
2018 CS	(United States) Jason Brown	(Russia) Mikhail Kolyada	(Russia) Alexander Samarin	
2019 CS	(United States) Jason Brown	(Georgia (country)) Morisi Kvitelashvili	(Russia) Makar Ignatov	
2020	Competition cancelled due to the COVID-19 pandemic			
2021 CS	(Canada) Keegan Messing	(Russia) Andrei Mozalev	(United States) Jimmy Ma	
2022 CS	(United States) Camden Pulkinen	(Italy) Matteo Rizzo	(Estonia) Mihhail Selevko	
2023 CS	(China) Jin Boyang	(Kazakhstan) Mikhail Shaidorov	(Estonia) Aleksandr Selevko	
2024 CS	(Estonia) Mihhail Selevko	(Estonia) Aleksandr Selevko	(France) François Pitot	
2025 CS	(France) Kévin Aymoz	(Estonia) Arlet Levandi	(France) Luc Economides	

=== Women's singles ===
Women's event medalists
Year	Gold	Silver	Bronze	Ref.
1967	(Austria) Wilfriede Reiter	(Hungary) Zsófia Wagner	(Czechoslovakia) Iva Matysová	
1968	(Sweden) Britt Elfving	(West Germany) Bärbel Fimmen	(Austria) Maja Winter	
1969	(Hungary) Zsófia Wagner	(West Germany) Brigitte Bergau	(Sweden) Anita Johansson	
1970	(Switzerland) Charlotte Walter	(East Germany) Steffi Knoll	(West Germany) Frigge Drzymalla	
1971	(East Germany) Marion Weber	(Hungary) Zsuzsa Homolya	(West Germany) Ilka Spormann	
1972	(East Germany) Birgit Süß	(Italy) Manuela Bertelé	(West Germany) Frigge Drzymalla	
1973	(East Germany) Anett Pötzsch	(Czechoslovakia) Zdenka Fiurašková	(Austria) Susanne Altura	
1974	(Soviet Union) Tatiana Rakomsa	(West Germany) Vera Burding	(Czechoslovakia) Yvette Stalová	
1975	(Soviet Union) Lia Gabelaja	(West Germany) Gabriele Mechling	(Czechoslovakia) Iva Cibulková	
1976	(East Germany) Carola Weißenberg	(Sweden) Lotta Crispin	(Socialist Federal Republic of Yugoslavia) Sanda Dubravčić	
1977	(Socialist Federal Republic of Yugoslavia) Sanda Dubravčić	(Australia) Belinda Coulthard	(Soviet Union) Liudmila Mineyeva	
1978	(Austria) Claudia Kristofics-Binder	(Socialist Federal Republic of Yugoslavia) Sanda Dubravčić	(East Germany) Katarina Witt	
1979	(West Germany) Dagmar Lurz	(Austria) Claudia Kristofics-Binder	(Socialist Federal Republic of Yugoslavia) Sanda Dubravčić	
1980	(Socialist Federal Republic of Yugoslavia) Sanda Dubravčić	(United States) Priscilla Hill	(East Germany) Janina Wirth	
1981	(Socialist Federal Republic of Yugoslavia) Sanda Dubravčić	(France) Nathalie Hildescheimer	(West Germany) Mercedes Roskam	
1982	(Socialist Federal Republic of Yugoslavia) Sanda Dubravčić	(Soviet Union) Natalia Ovchinnikova	(Belgium) Katrien Pauwels	
1983	(Socialist Federal Republic of Yugoslavia) Sanda Dubravčić	(United States) Rosalynn Sumners	(Italy) Karin Telser	
1984	(France) Agnès Gosselin	(United States) Kelly Webster	(Switzerland) Claudia Villiger	
1985	(East Germany) Constanze Gensel	(Switzerland) Manuela Tschupp	(West Germany) Heike Gobbers	
1986	(United States) Caryn Kadavy	(Soviet Union) Ana Kondrasova	(Socialist Federal Republic of Yugoslavia) Željka Čižmešija	
1987	(United States) Jeri Campbell	(Canada) Charlene Wong	(Belgium) Katrien Pauwels	
1988	(Canada) Lisa Sargeant	(United States) Kelly Szmurlo	(West Germany) Anja Geissler	
1989	(United States) Kelly Szmurlo	(Canada) Dianne Takeuchi	(South Korea) Lily Lyoonjung Lee	
1990	(Soviet Union) Julia Vorobieva	(West Germany) Anja Geissler	(United States) Tisha Walker	
1991	Competition cancelled due to the Croatian War of Independence			
1992	(Croatia) Melita Juratek	(Croatia) Ivana Jakupčević	(France) Vanessa Gusméroli	
1993	(Azerbaijan) Julia Vorobieva	(Russia) Ms. Usatova	(France) Véronique Fleury	
1994	(Azerbaijan) Julia Vorobieva	(Japan) Tomoko Imagawi	(Hungary) Barbara Maros	
1995	(Slovenia) Mojca Kopač	(Azerbaijan) Julia Vorobieva	(Croatia) Ivana Jakupčević	
1996	(Slovenia) Mojca Kopač	(Australia) Joanne Carter	(Poland) Sabina Wojtala	
1997	(Uzbekistan) Tatiana Malinina	(United States) Brittney McConn	(Hungary) Júlia Sebestyén	
1998	(Russia) Julia Soldatova	(Hungary) Júlia Sebestyén	(France) Vanessa Gusméroli	
1999	(Russia) Viktoria Volchkova	(Slovakia) Zuzana Paurová	(Hungary) Tamara Dorofejev	
2000	(Belarus) Julia Soldatova	(Russia) Kristina Oblasova	(Hungary) Tamara Dorofejev	
2001	(Canada) Michelle Currie	(United States) Amber Corwin	(Austria) Julia Lautowa	
2002	(Finland) Alisa Drei	(United States) Yebin Mok	(Hungary) Júlia Sebestyén	
2003	(Slovakia) Zuzana Babiaková	(Hungary) Diána Póth	(Croatia) Idora Hegel	
2004	(Croatia) Idora Hegel	(Ukraine) Galina Maniachenko	(Hungary) Diána Póth	
2005	(Finland) Alisa Drei	(Canada) Meagan Duhamel	(Italy) Silvia Fontana	
2006	(Czech Republic) Nella Simaová	(Israel) Tamar Katz	(Finland) Alisa Drei	
2007	(Japan) Akiko Suzuki	(Finland) Kiira Korpi	(Russia) Katarina Gerboldt	
2008	(Hungary) Júlia Sebestyén	(Sweden) Joshi Helgesson	(United Kingdom) Jenna McCorkell	
2009	(Japan) Shion Kokubun	(Russia) Ekaterina Kozireva	(Russia) Katarina Gerboldt	
2010	(Spain) Sonia Lafuente	(Japan) Kako Tomotaki	(Slovenia) Patricia Gleščič	
2011	(Russia) Adelina Sotnikova	(Japan) Haruna Suzuki	(Russia) Maria Artemieva	
2012	(Italy) Carolina Kostner	(Russia) Kristina Zaseeva	(Brazil) Isadora Williams	
2013	(South Korea) Yuna Kim	(Japan) Miki Ando	(Russia) Elizaveta Tuktamysheva	
2014 CS	(Finland) Kiira Korpi	(Russia) Maria Artemieva	(Slovakia) Nicole Rajičová	
2015 CS	(Russia) Elizaveta Tuktamysheva	(Kazakhstan) Elizabet Tursynbaeva	(United States) Karen Chen	
2016 CS	(Italy) Carolina Kostner	(Russia) Elizaveta Tuktamysheva	(Russia) Alena Leonova	
2017 CS	(Russia) Stanislava Konstantinova	(Russia) Alisa Fedichkina	(Russia) Elizaveta Tuktamysheva	
2018 CS	(United States) Bradie Tennell	(Russia) Anastasiia Gubanova	(United States) Mariah Bell	
2019 CS	(Russia) Elizaveta Tuktamysheva	(Belarus) Viktoriia Safonova	(Germany) Nicole Schott	
2020	Competition cancelled due to the COVID-19 pandemic			
2021 CS	(Georgia (country)) Anastasiia Gubanova	(United States) Amber Glenn	(Estonia) Niina Petrõkina	
2022 CS	(United States) Lindsay Thorngren	(United States) Bradie Tennell	(Canada) Madeline Schizas	
2023 CS	(Italy) Sarina Joos	(United States) Amber Glenn	(United States) Starr Andrews	
2024 CS	(United States) Alysa Liu	(Belgium) Nina Pinzarrone	(United States) Bradie Tennell	
2025 CS	(United States) Bradie Tennell	(Finland) Iida Karhunen	(Kazakhstan) Sofia Samodelkina	

=== Pairs ===
Pairs' event medalists
Year	Gold	Silver	Bronze	Ref.
1967	(Czechoslovakia); Miroslava Sáblíková; Pavel Komárek	(Romania); Daniela Popesci; Marian Chiosea	No other competitors	
1968	(Austria); Evelyne Schneider; Wilhelm Bietak	(West Germany); Anneliese Seger; Karl-Heinz Zitterbart	(East Germany); Beatrix von Brück; Reinhard Mirmsecker	
1969	(West Germany); Almut Lehmann; Herbert Wiesinger	(Poland); Grażyna Osmańska; Adam Brodecki	(Hungary); Éva Farkas; Tamas Korpás	
1970	(West Germany); Brunhilde Baßler; Eberhard Rausch	(East Germany); Fräulein Johne; Herr Kurzweg	(Poland); Grażyna Osmańska; Adam Brodecki	
1971	(East Germany); Sylvia Konzak; Veit Kempe	(Austria); Ursula Nemec; Michael Nemec	No other competitors	
1972	(Canada); Sandra Bezic; Val Bezic	(Switzerland); Karin Künzle; Christian Künzle	(East Germany); Petra Hümmler; Peter Repa	
1973	(Soviet Union); Nadezhda Gorshkova; Evgeni Shevalovski	(France); Florence Cahn; Jean-Roland Racle	(Austria); Ursula Nemec; Michael Nemec	
1974	Pairs competition cancelled			
1975	(West Germany); Corinna Halke; Eberhard Rausch	(East Germany); Fräulein Frank; Mathias Clausner	(Austria); Ursula Nemec; Michael Nemec	
1976	(Czechoslovakia); Ingrid Spieglová; Alan Spiegl	(Soviet Union); Galina Tairova; Alexei Golowkin	(West Germany); Susanne Scheide; Andreas Nischwitz	
1977	(East Germany); Sabine Baeß; Tassilo Thierbach	(Soviet Union); Elena Vasyukova; Alexei Pogodin	(West Germany); Gabriele Beck; Jochen Stahl	
1978	(East Germany); Sabine Baeß; Tassilo Thierbach	(Soviet Union); Julia Bystrova; Mikhail Valjenin	(France); Sabine Fuchs; Xavier Videau	
1979	(East Germany); Cornelia Haufe; Kersten Bellmann	(Soviet Union); Anna Malgina; Sergei Korovin	(France); Kathia Dubec; Xavier Douillard	
1980	No pairs competition			
1981	(East Germany); Cornelia Haufe; Kersten Bellmann	(Soviet Union); Anna Malgina; Sergei Korovin	(France); Kathia Dubec; Xavier Douillard	
1982–90	No pairs competitions			
1991	Competition cancelled due to the Croatian War of Independence			
1992–93	No pairs competitions			
1994	(Russia); Julija Miškina; Aleksej Minin	(Netherlands); Jeltje Schulten; Alcuin Schulten	No other competitors	
1995	No pairs competition			
1996	(Poland); Dorota Zagórska; Mariusz Siudek	(Azerbaijan); Inga Rodionova; Aleksandr Anichenko	No other competitors	
1997	(United States); Katie Barnhart; Charles Bernard	(United States); Naomi Grabow; Benjamin Oberman	(Uzbekistan); Natalia Ponomareva; Evgeni Sviridov	
1998	(Canada); Nadia Micallef; Bruno Marcotte	(Slovakia); Oľga Beständigová; Jozef Beständig	(Canada); Marie-France LaChappelle; Sacha Blanchet	
1999	(France); Catherine Huc; Vivien Rolland	(Slovakia); Oľga Beständigová; Jozef Beständig	(Russia); Victoria Maksyuta; Vitali Dubina	
2000	(United States); Stephanie Kalesavich; Aaron Parchem	(United States); Molly Quigley; Bert Cording	(France); Marie-Pierre Leray; Nicolas Osseland	
2001	(France); Sarah Abitbol; Stéphane Bernadis	(Germany); Mariana Kautz; Norman Jeschke	(Canada); Chantal Poirier; Ian Moram	
2002	(United States); Larisa Spielberg; Craig Joeright	(Slovakia); Maria Guerassimenko; Vladimir Futáš	(Uzbekistan); Marina Aganina; Artem Knyazev	
2003	(United States); Amanda Evora; Mark Ladwig	(Canada); Hjordis Lee; Lenny Faustino	(United States); Tiffany Vise; Derek Trent	
2004	No pairs competition			
2005	(Canada); Meagan Duhamel; Ryan Arnold	(Russia); Arina Ushakova; Sergei Karev	(United States); Katie Beriau; Joseph Gazzola	
2006–07	No pairs competitions			
2008	(United Kingdom); Stacey Kemp; David King	(Italy); Nicole Della Monica; Yannick Kocon	(Ukraine); Kateryna Kostenko; Roman Talan	
2009	(Russia); Liubov Ilyushechkina; Nodari Maisuradze	(Russia); Anastasia Martiusheva; Alexei Rogonov	(Bulgaria); Nina Ivanova; Filip Zalevski	
2010	(Russia); Anastasia Martiusheva; Alexei Rogonov	(Russia); Tatiana Danilova; Andrei Novoselov	(United States); Molly Arron; Daniyel Cohen	
2011	(Russia); Anastasia Martiusheva; Alexei Rogonov	(Germany); Katharina Gierok; Florian Just	(Israel); Danielle Montalbano; Evgeni Krasnopolski	
2012	(Azerbaijan); Angelina Ekaterina; Philipp Tarasov	(Austria); Stina Martini; Severin Kiefer	(Bulgaria); Elizaveta Makarova; Leri Kenchadze	
2013	(Israel); Andrea Davidovich; Evgeni Krasnopolski	(Estonia); Natalia Zabiiako; Alexandr Zaboev	(Ukraine); Julia Lavrentieva; Yuri Rudyk	
2014 CS	(Russia); Kristina Astakhova; Alexei Rogonov	(Italy); Valentina Marchei; Ondřej Hotárek	(United States); Tarah Kayne; Daniel O'Shea	
2015 CS	(Russia); Evgenia Tarasova; Vladimir Morozov	(Russia); Kristina Astakhova; Alexei Rogonov	(United States); Tarah Kayne; Daniel O'Shea	
2016 CS	(Italy); Nicole Della Monica; Matteo Guarise	(Russia); Kristina Astakhova; Alexei Rogonov	(United States); Ashley Cain; Timothy LeDuc	
2017 CS	(Russia); Natalia Zabiiako; Alexander Enbert	(Russia); Kristina Astakhova; Alexei Rogonov	(United States); Tarah Kayne; Daniel O'Shea	
2018 CS	(Russia); Alisa Efimova; Aleksandr Korovin	(United States); Alexa Scimeca Knierim; Chris Knierim	(United States); Deanna Stellato; Nathan Bartholomay	
2019 CS	(United States); Ashley Cain-Gribble; Timothy LeDuc	(United States); Tarah Kayne; Daniel O'Shea	(Germany); Minerva Fabienne Hase; Nolan Seegert	
2020	Competition cancelled due to the COVID-19 pandemic			
2021 CS	(United States); Audrey Lu; Misha Mitrofanov	(Georgia (country)); Anastasiia Metelkina; Daniil Parkman	(Russia); Iuliia Artemeva; Mikhail Nazarychev	
2022 CS	(United States); Anastasiia Smirnova; Danylo Siianytsia	(United States); Ellie Kam; Daniel O'Shea	(Canada); Lia Pereira; Trennt Michaud	
2023 CS	(Finland); Milania Väänänen; Filippo Clerici	(United States); Valentina Plazas; Maximiliano Fernandez	(Ukraine); Sofiia Holichenko; Artem Darenskyi	
2024 CS	(Poland); Ioulia Chtchetinina; Michał Woźniak	(United States); Emily Chan; Spencer Akira Howe	(United States); Audrey Shin; Balázs Nagy	
2025 CS	(United States); Audrey Shin; Balázs Nagy	(United States); Valentina Plazas; Maximiliano Fernandez	(France); Aurélie Faula; Théo Belle	

=== Ice dance ===
Ice dance event medalists
Year	Gold	Silver	Bronze	Ref.
1981	(Hungary); Judit Péterfy; Csaba Bálint	(Soviet Union); Marina Klimova; Sergei Ponomarenko	(West Germany); Brigit Goller; Peter Klisch	
1982	(Soviet Union); Natalia Annenko; Genrikh Sretenski	(United States); Susan Wynne; Joseph Druar	(Hungary); Judit Péterfy; Csaba Bálint	
1983	(West Germany); Petra Born; Rainer Schönborn	(Soviet Union); Tatiana Gladkova; Igor Shpilband	(United States); Eva Hunyadi; Jay Pinkerton	
1984	(West Germany); Petra Born; Rainer Schönborn	(Italy); Isabella Micheli; Roberto Pelizzola	(United States); Kandi Amelon; Alec Binnie	
1985	(West Germany); Antonia Becherer; Ferdinand Becherer	(Soviet Union); Ms. Pronkina; Igor Shpilband	(United States); April Sargent; John D'Amelio	
1986	(United States); Susan Wynne; Joseph Druar	(Czechoslovakia); Andrea Juklová; Martin Šimeček	(Canada); Kim Weeks; Curtis Moore	
1987	(Italy); Stefania Calegari; Pasquale Camerlengo	(United States); Jodie Balogh; Jerod Swallow	(Canada); Nathalie Lessard; Darcy Pleckham	
1988	(Canada); Melanie Cole; Michael Farrington	(United States); Dorothy Rodek; Robert Nardozza	(France); Christelle Gautier; Alberick Dalongeville	
1989	(Soviet Union); Elizaveta Stekolnikova; Oleg Ovsyannikov	(France); Pascale Vrot; David Quinsac	(United States); Lisa Grove; Scott Myers	
1990	(United States); Elisa Curtis; Robert Nardozza	(Soviet Union); Ms. Karewskaja; Mr. Kurockin	(Japan); Syoko Higashino; Tatsuro Matsumura	
1991	Competition cancelled due to the Croatian War of Independence			
1992	No ice dance competition			
1993	(Russia); Ms.Vożegova; Mr. Sadakov	(Azerbaijan); Olga Pershankova; Nikolai Morozov	(Hungary); Enikő Berkes; Szilard Toth	
1994	(Netherlands); Anita Chaudhuri; Hans 't Hart	(Australia); Christine Seydel; Duncan Smart	No other competitors	
1995	No ice dance competition			
1996	(Poland); Iwona Filipowicz; Michał Szumski	(Canada); Marie-France Dubreuil; Patrice Lauzon	(Russia); Anastasia Grebenkina; Vazgen Azrojan	
1997	(Armenia); Ksenia Smetanenko; Samvel Gezalian	(Russia); Anastasia Grebenkina; Vazgen Azrojan	(Slovakia); Zuzana Merzová; Tomáš Morbacher	
1998	(Russia); Oksana Potdykova; Denis Petukhov	(Russia); Nina Ulanova; Michail Stifunin	(France); Nadine Lesaout; Emmanuel Huet	
1999	(Israel); Galit Chait; Sergei Sakhnovski	(Bulgaria); Albena Denkova; Maxim Staviski	(Ukraine); Natalia Gudina; Alexei Beletski	
2000	(Hungary); Zita Gebora; András Visontai	(Azerbaijan); Kristin Fraser; Igor Lukanin	(Czech Republic); Kateřina Kovalová; David Szurman	
2001	(Poland); Sylwia Nowak; Sebastian Kolasiński	(Switzerland); Eliane Hugentobler; Daniel Hugentobler	(United Kingdom); Marika Humphreys; Vitali Baranov	
2002	(Ukraine); Julia Golovina; Oleg Voyko	(United States); Kendra Goodwin; Chris Obzansky	(France); Eve Bentley; Cédric Pernet	
2003	(Hungary); Nóra Hoffmann; Attila Elek	(United Kingdom); Pamela O'Connor; Jonathon O'Dougherty	(Russia); Jana Khokhlova; Sergei Novitski	
2004	(Czech Republic); Diana Janošťáková; Jiří Procházka	(Poland); Aleksandra Kauc; Michał Zych	(Slovakia); Ivana Dlhopolčeková; Hynek Bílek	
2005	(Ukraine); Alla Beknazarova; Vladimir Zuev	(United States); Caitlin Mallory; Brent Holdburg	(Czech Republic); Kamila Hájková; David Vincour	
2006	(Azerbaijan); Kristin Fraser; Igor Lukanin	(Ukraine); Alla Beknazarova; Vladimir Zuev	(Lithuania); Katherine Copely; Deividas Stagniūnas	
2007	(Ukraine); Alla Beknazarova; Vladimir Zuev	(Russia); Natalia Mikhailova; Andrei Maximishin	(Lithuania); Katherine Copely; Deividas Stagniūnas	
2008	(Ukraine); Alla Beknazarova; Vladimir Zuev	(Russia); Kristina Gorshkova; Vitali Butikov	(Ukraine); Nadezhda Frolenkova; Mykhailo Kasalo	
2009	(Israel); Alexandra Zaretsky; Roman Zaretsky	(Russia); Ekaterina Riazanova; Ilia Tkachenko	(United Kingdom); Penny Coomes; Nicholas Buckland	
2010	(Czech Republic); Lucie Myslivečková; Matěj Novák	(Russia); Kristina Gorshkova; Vitali Butikov	(Italy); Charlène Guignard; Marco Fabbri	
2011	(Germany); Nelli Zhiganshina; Alexander Gazsi	(United Kingdom); Penny Coomes; Nicholas Buckland	(Italy); Charlène Guignard; Marco Fabbri	
2012	(Russia); Ekaterina Riazanova; Ilia Tkachenko	(Azerbaijan); Julia Zlobina; Alexei Sitnikov	(Ukraine); Siobhan Heekin-Canedy; Dmitri Dun	
2013	(Azerbaijan); Julia Zlobina; Alexei Sitnikov	(France); Pernelle Carron; Lloyd Jones	(Turkey); Alisa Agafonova; Alper Uçar	
2014 CS	(United States); Madison Hubbell; Zachary Donohue	(Italy); Charlène Guignard; Marco Fabbri	(Spain); Sara Hurtado; Adrián Díaz	
2015 CS	(Italy); Charlène Guignard; Marco Fabbri	(United States); Kaitlin Hawayek; Jean-Luc Baker	(Armenia); Tina Garabedian; Simon Proulx-Sénécal	
2016 CS	(Italy); Charlène Guignard; Marco Fabbri	(United States); Kaitlin Hawayek; Jean-Luc Baker	(Turkey); Alisa Agafonova; Alper Uçar	
2017 CS	(Russia); Ekaterina Bobrova; Dmitri Soloviev	(Italy); Charlène Guignard; Marco Fabbri	(United States); Kaitlin Hawayek; Jean-Luc Baker	
2018 CS	(Canada); Piper Gilles; Paul Poirier	(Poland); Natalia Kaliszek; Maksym Spodyriev	(Russia); Betina Popova; Sergey Mozgov	
2019 CS	(Italy); Charlène Guignard; Marco Fabbri	(Russia); Annabelle Morozov; Andrei Bagin	(United States); Caroline Green; Michael Parsons	
2020	Competition cancelled due to the COVID-19 pandemic			
2021 CS	(United States); Kaitlin Hawayek; Jean-Luc Baker	(Lithuania); Allison Reed; Saulius Ambrulevičius	(Russia); Iuliia Artemeva; Devid Naryzhnyy	
2022 CS	(United States); Christina Carreira; Anthony Ponomarenko	(Lithuania); Allison Reed; Saulius Ambrulevičius	(United States); Emilea Zingas; Vadym Kolesnik	
2023 CS	(Lithuania); Allison Reed; Saulius Ambrulevičius	(United States); Emilea Zingas; Vadym Kolesnik	(United States); Isabella Flores; Ivan Desyatov	
2024 CS	(United Kingdom); Phebe Bekker; James Hernandez	(Georgia (country)); Diana Davis; Gleb Smolkin	(Germany); Jennifer Janse van Rensburg; Benjamin Steffan	
2025 CS	(Italy); Charlène Guignard; Marco Fabbri	(France); Loïcia Demougeot; Théo le Mercier	(Czech Republic); Kateřina Mrázková; Daniel Mrázek	

== Records ==
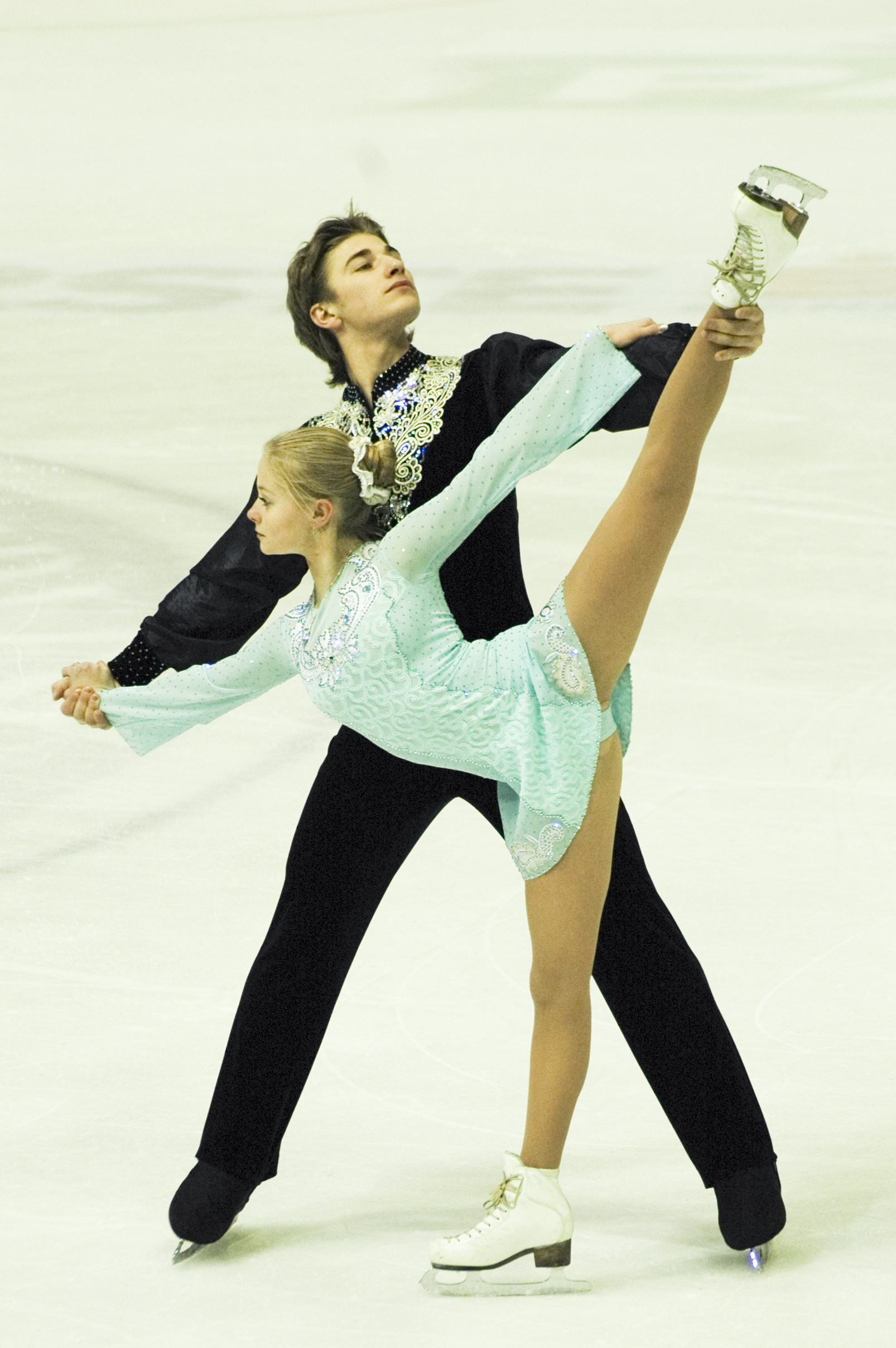
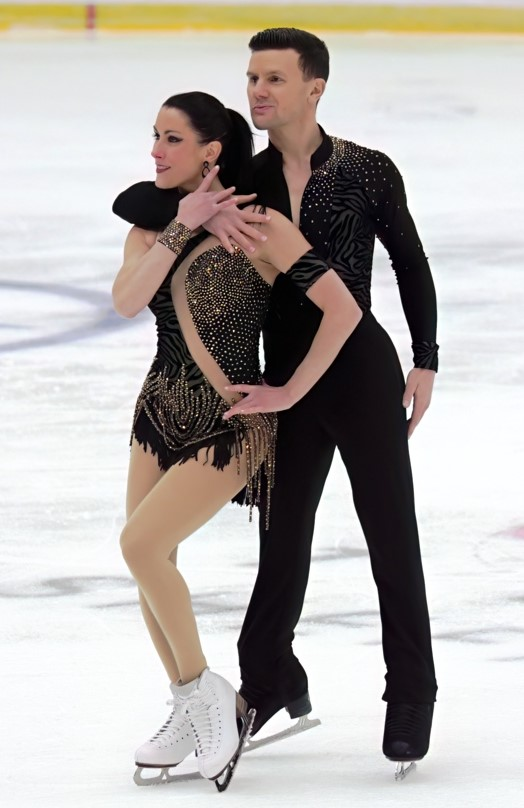
From left to right: Anastasia Martiusheva and Alexei Rogonov of Russia won two Golden Spin of Zagreb titles in pair skating, while Charlène Guignard and Marco Fabbri of Italy won four Golden Spin of Zagreb titles in ice dance.

Records
Discipline	Most titles			
Discipline	Skater(s)	No.	Years	Ref.
Men's singles	(Hungary); László Vajda	4	1971–72; 1974–75	
Women's singles	(Socialist Federal Republic of Yugoslavia); Sanda Dubravčić	5	1977; 1980–83	
Pairs	(East Germany); Sabine Baeß; Tassilo Thierbach	2	1977–78	
Pairs	(East Germany); Cornelia Haufe; Kersten Bellmann	2	1979; 1981	
Pairs	(Russia); Anastasia Martiusheva; Alexei Rogonov	2	2010–11	
Pairs	(Russia); Alexei Rogonov; (Note: Alexei Rogonov won three two titles while partnered with Anastasia Martiusheva, and one with Kristina Astakhova.)	3	2010–11; 2014	
Ice dance	(Italy); Charlène Guignard; Marco Fabbri	4	2015–16; 2019; 2025	

== Cumulative medal count ==
=== Men's singles ===
Total number of Golden Spin of Zagreb medals in men's singles by nation
Rank	Nation	Gold	Silver	Bronze	Total
1	United States	9	5	4	18
2	Russia	6	8	8	22
3	Hungary	6	4	2	12
4	France	5	1	9	15
5	Soviet Union	3	3	1	7
5	West Germany	3	3	1	7
7	Kazakhstan	3	2	0	5
8	Slovenia	3	1	0	4
9	Japan	3	0	1	4
10	East Germany	2	3	4	9
11	Canada	2	1	3	6
12	Romania	2	0	1	3
13	China	2	0	0	2
14	Austria	1	4	3	8
15	Czechoslovakia	1	2	2	5
15	Estonia	1	2	2	5
17	Israel	1	2	1	4
18	Georgia	1	1	1	3
19	Ukraine	1	0	2	3
20	Belarus	1	0	0	1
20	Switzerland	1	0	0	1
22	Azerbaijan	0	3	0	3
23	Italy	0	2	2	4
24	Czech Republic	0	2	0	2
24	Poland	0	2	0	2
26	Sweden	0	1	3	4
27	Germany	0	1	2	3
28	Australia	0	1	1	2
28	Slovakia	0	1	1	2
30	Belgium	0	1	0	1
30	Croatia	0	1	0	1
32	Denmark	0	0	1	1
32	Finland	0	0	1	1
32	Yugoslavia	0	0	1	1
Totals (34 entries)		57	57	57	171

=== Women's singles ===
Total number of Golden Spin of Zagreb medals in women's singles by nation
Rank	Nation	Gold	Silver	Bronze	Total
1	United States	7	10	5	22
2	Russia	6	8	6	20
3	Yugoslavia	5	1	3	9
4	East Germany	5	1	2	8
5	Finland	3	2	1	6
5	Soviet Union	3	2	1	6
7	Italy	3	1	2	6
8	Hungary	2	4	6	12
9	Japan	2	4	0	6
10	Canada	2	3	1	6
11	Austria	2	1	3	6
12	Croatia	2	1	2	5
13	Azerbaijan	2	1	0	3
14	Slovenia	2	0	1	3
15	West Germany	1	5	6	12
16	Sweden	1	2	1	4
17	France	1	1	3	5
18	Slovakia	1	1	1	3
18	Switzerland	1	1	1	3
20	Belarus	1	1	0	2
21	South Korea	1	0	1	2
22	Czech Republic	1	0	0	1
22	Georgia	1	0	0	1
22	Spain	1	0	0	1
22	Uzbekistan	1	0	0	1
26	Australia	0	2	0	2
27	Czechoslovakia	0	1	3	4
28	Belgium	0	1	2	3
29	Kazakhstan	0	1	1	2
30	Israel	0	1	0	1
30	Ukraine	0	1	0	1
32	Brazil	0	0	1	1
32	Estonia	0	0	1	1
32	Germany	0	0	1	1
32	Great Britain	0	0	1	1
32	Poland	0	0	1	1
Totals (36 entries)		57	57	57	171

=== Pairs ===
Total number of Golden Spin of Zagreb medals in pair skating by nation
Rank	Nation	Gold	Silver	Bronze	Total
1	United States	8	8	9	25
2	Russia	8	6	2	16
3	East Germany	5	2	2	9
4	Canada	3	1	3	7
5	West Germany	3	1	2	6
6	France	2	1	5	8
7	Poland	2	1	1	4
8	Czechoslovakia	2	0	0	2
9	Soviet Union	1	5	0	6
10	Austria	1	2	2	5
11	Italy	1	2	0	3
12	Azerbaijan	1	1	0	2
13	Israel	1	0	1	2
14	Finland	1	0	0	1
14	Great Britain	1	0	0	1
16	Slovakia	0	3	0	3
17	Germany	0	2	1	3
18	Estonia	0	1	0	1
18	Georgia	0	1	0	1
18	Netherlands	0	1	0	1
18	Romania	0	1	0	1
18	Switzerland	0	1	0	1
23	Ukraine	0	0	3	3
24	Bulgaria	0	0	2	2
24	Uzbekistan	0	0	2	2
26	Hungary	0	0	1	1
Totals (26 entries)		40	40	36	116

=== Ice dance ===
Total number of Golden Spin of Zagreb medals in ice dance by nation
Rank	Nation	Gold	Silver	Bronze	Total
1	United States	5	8	8	21
2	Italy	5	3	2	10
3	Russia	4	7	4	15
4	Ukraine	4	1	3	8
5	Hungary	3	0	2	5
6	West Germany	3	0	1	4
7	Soviet Union	2	4	0	6
8	Azerbaijan	2	3	0	5
9	Poland	2	2	0	4
10	Canada	2	1	2	5
11	Czech Republic	2	0	3	5
12	Israel	2	0	0	2
13	Great Britain	1	2	2	5
13	Lithuania	1	2	2	5
15	Armenia	1	0	1	2
15	Germany	1	0	1	2
17	Netherlands	1	0	0	1
18	France	0	3	3	6
19	Australia	0	1	0	1
19	Bulgaria	0	1	0	1
19	Czechoslovakia	0	1	0	1
19	Georgia	0	1	0	1
19	Switzerland	0	1	0	1
24	Slovakia	0	0	2	2
24	Turkey	0	0	2	2
26	Japan	0	0	1	1
26	Spain	0	0	1	1
Totals (27 entries)		41	41	40	122

=== Total medals ===
Total number of Golden Spin of Zagreb medals by nation
Rank	Nation	Gold	Silver	Bronze	Total
1	United States	29	31	26	86
2	Russia	24	29	20	73
3	East Germany	12	6	8	26
4	Hungary	11	8	11	30
5	West Germany	10	9	10	29
6	Soviet Union	9	14	2	25
7	Italy	9	8	6	23
8	Canada	9	6	9	24
9	France	8	6	20	34
10	Azerbaijan	5	8	0	13
11	Japan	5	4	2	11
12	Ukraine	5	2	8	15
13	Yugoslavia	5	1	4	10
14	Slovenia	5	1	1	7
15	Austria	4	7	8	19
16	Poland	4	5	2	11
17	Israel	4	3	2	9
18	Finland	4	2	2	8
19	Czechoslovakia	3	4	5	12
20	Kazakhstan	3	3	1	7
21	Czech Republic	3	2	3	8
22	Georgia	2	3	1	6
22	Switzerland	2	3	1	6
24	Great Britain	2	2	3	7
25	Croatia	2	2	2	6
26	Romania	2	1	1	4
27	Belarus	2	1	0	3
28	China	2	0	0	2
29	Slovakia	1	5	4	10
30	Germany	1	3	5	9
31	Sweden	1	3	4	8
32	Estonia	1	3	3	7
33	Lithuania	1	2	2	5
34	Netherlands	1	1	0	2
35	Uzbekistan	1	0	2	3
36	Armenia	1	0	1	2
36	South Korea	1	0	1	2
36	Spain	1	0	1	2
39	Australia	0	4	1	5
40	Belgium	0	2	2	4
41	Bulgaria	0	1	2	3
42	Turkey	0	0	2	2
43	Brazil	0	0	1	1
43	Denmark	0	0	1	1
Totals (44 entries)		195	195	190	580
