= Nadezhda Gorshkova =

Russian pair skater (born 1956)

Personal information
- Native name: Надежда Николаевна Горшкова
- Full name: Nadezhda Nikolayevna Gorshkova
- Other names: Shevalovskaya
- Born: 27 June 1956 (age 70) Moscow, Russian SFSR, Soviet Union

Figure skating career
- Country: Soviet Union
- Partner: Evgeni Shevalovski
- Retired: 1978

Nadezhda Nikolayevna Gorshkova (Russian: Надежда Николаевна Горшкова; born 27 June 1956), married surname: Shevalovskaya (Шеваловская) is a Russian former pair skater who competed for the Soviet Union. With her husband Evgeni Shevalovski, she is a two-time Prize of Moscow News champion (1974–75) and a three-time Soviet national silver medalist (1974–76). The duo finished in the top six at three ISU Championships.

== Results ==
(with Shevalovski)

International
Event	72–73	73–74	74–75	75–76	76–77	77–78
World Championships			6th			
European Championships			5th	6th		
Prize of Moscow News			1st	1st	2nd	
National
Soviet Championships	4th	2nd	2nd	2nd		
Spartakiada		2nd*				4th
USSR Cup			1st		1st	
*1974 Spartakiada results were used for 1974 Soviet Nationals
