= Miloš Milanović =

Serbian figure skater (born 1981)

Miloš Milanović Милош Миловановић
Personal information
- Born: July 5, 1981 (age 45)
- Height: 172 cm (5 ft 8 in)

Figure skating career
- Country: Serbia
- Skating club: Red Star Belgrade
- Retired: 2002

Miloš Milanović (Serbian Cyrillic: Милош Миловановић; born July 5, 1981, in Belgrade) is a Serbian figure skater who competed for both Yugoslavia and Serbia and Montenegro. He is the 1997-2001 Yugoslavian national champion. In the 2000/2001 season, he competed on the Junior Grand Prix and at the Ondrej Nepela Memorial. He twice placed 35th at the European Figure Skating Championships and his highest placement at the World Figure Skating Championships was 35th, in 2002.
