= Nevenka Lisak =

Croatian competitive figure skater

Figure skating career
- Country: Yugoslavia
- Skating club: KKK Medveščak

Nevenka Lisak is a Croatian former competitive figure skater. She represented Yugoslavia during the 1980s. She competed at five European Championships, achieving her best result, 19th, at the 1984 European Championships in Budapest, Hungary. She trained at KKK Medveščak in Zagreb.

== Competitive highlights ==
Event	77–78	78–79	79–80	80–81	81–82	82–83	83–84	84–85
European Championships			22nd	21st	24th		19th	22nd
Blue Swords							8th	
World Junior Championships		21st						
Yugoslav Championships	3rd	2nd	2nd	2nd	3rd	2nd	2nd	
