= Trifun Živanović =

American-born Serbian figure skater (born 1975)

Personal information
- Born: April 17, 1975 (age 51) Santa Monica, California
- Height: 173 cm (5 ft 8 in) 5’8”

Figure skating career
- Country: Serbia
- Skating club: Ice Integra Belgrade

Trifun Živanović (Serbian Cyrillic: Трифун Живановић; born April 17, 1975, in Santa Monica, California) is an American-born Serbian figure skater.

== Career ==
Through 2001, Zivanovic competed for the United States, twice capturing medals at the U.S. Championships. In 2001, he decided to represent Yugoslavia. The country later became known as Serbia and Montenegro.

To qualify for the 2006 Olympics, Zivanovic needed to place in the top 24 at the 2005 World Championships, where he finished 30th, or in the top six at the 2005 Karl Schafer Memorial, where he was 9th. He finally qualified for the Olympics after several skaters withdrew.

In his final season, due to Montenegro's independence, Zivanovic competed for Serbia.

Zivanovic has the distinction of having competed at the World Figure Skating Championships representing four countries: the United States, Yugoslavia, Serbia and Montenegro, and Serbia. He is also one of the few skaters to have competed at both the Four Continents Championships and the European Championships. He is the first male singles skater to have competed at every senior-level ISU Championships.

Zivanovic works as an ice skating instructor at Pickwick Ice Center in Burbank, California.

== Personal life ==
In 2001, Zivanovic moved to Belgrade for a year to establish Yugoslav citizenship. His father is Serbian. His mother has muscular dystrophy.

== Programs ==
Season	Short program	Free skating
2005–2007	Dances With Wolves by John Berry; The Postman by James Newton Howard	Batman Dark City
2004–2005	March of the Toreadors by Georges Bizet	Phantom of the Opera by Andrew Lloyd Webber
2003–2004	Ukraine by Dean Marshal performed by Barrage	Clubbed to Death by Rob Dougan; Sky Break by Alex Giffare
2002–2003	Ukraine by Dean Marshal performed by Barrage	Dracula by Wojciech Kilar

== Competitive highlights ==
=== For Yugoslavia, Serbia and Montenegro, Serbia ===
International
Event	01–02	02–03	03–04	04–05	05–06	06–07
Olympics					26th	
Worlds			29th	30th	24th	30th
Europeans			21st	17th	29th	
GP Cup of Russia		11th				
GP Skate America			7th			
Schäfer Memorial		3rd		6th	9th	
Nebelhorn Trophy		6th	6th	8th		WD
Helena Pajovic Cup			1st			
National
Serbia						1st
Serbia & Montenegro		1st	1st	1st	1st	
Yugoslavia	1st					
GP = Grand Prix; WD = Withdrew

=== For the United States ===
International
Event	1992–93	93–94	94–95	95–96	96–97	97–98	98–99	99–00	00–01
Worlds							16th		
Four Continents							7th	9th	
GP Cup of Russia								6th	
GP NHK Trophy									11th
GP Skate America									8th
GP Sparkassen								5th	
Finlandia Trophy				4th					
Golden Spin						2nd			
Schäfer Memorial							2nd		
Nebelhorn Trophy							1st		
Piruetten					3rd				
National
U.S. Champ.	11th J	6th J	2nd J	7th	WD	7th	2nd	3rd	5th
GP = Grand Prix; J = Junior level; WD = Withdrew
