= Evgeni Shevalovski =

Russian former pair skater (born 1949)

Personal information
- Native name: Евгений Иванович Шеваловский
- Full name: Evgeni Ivanovich Shevalovski
- Born: 26 March 1949 (age 77) Moscow, Russian SFSR, Soviet Union

Figure skating career
- Country: Soviet Union
- Partner: Nadezhda Gorshkova
- Retired: 1978

Evgeni Ivanovich Shevalovski (Russian: Евгений Иванович Шеваловский; born 26 March 1949) is a Russian former pair skater who competed for the Soviet Union. With his wife Nadezhda Gorshkova, he is a two-time Prize of Moscow News champion (1974–75) and a three-time Soviet national silver medalist (1974–76). The duo finished in the top six at three ISU Championships.

== Results ==
(with Gorshkova)

International
Event	72–73	73–74	74–75	75–76	76–77	77–78
World Championships			6th			
European Championships			5th	6th		
Prize of Moscow News			1st	1st	2nd	
National
Soviet Championships	4th	2nd	2nd	2nd		
Spartakiada		2nd*				4th
USSR Cup			1st		1st	
*1974 Spartakiada results were used for 1974 Soviet Nationals
