= 1967 World Figure Skating Championships =

Annual figure skating competition held in 1967

- Type: ISU Championship
- Date: February 28 – March 4
- Season: 1966–67
- Location: Vienna, Austria
- Venue: Wiener Stadthalle

Champions
- Men's singles: (Austria) Emmerich Danzer
- Ladies' singles: (United States) Peggy Fleming
- Pairs: (Soviet Union) Lyudmila Belousova / Oleg Protopopov
- Ice dance: (United Kingdom) Diane Towler / Bernard Ford
- Previous: 1966 World Championships
- Next: 1968 World Championships

The 1967 World Figure Skating Championships were held on an open-air ice rink in Vienna, Austria from February 28 to March 4. At the event, sanctioned by the International Skating Union, medals were awarded in men's singles, ladies' singles, pair skating, and ice dance.

This competition was the final time in which all events, other than compulsory figures, were held in an outdoor rink.

== Medal table ==
* Host nation (Austria)

Rank	Nation	Gold	Silver	Bronze	Total
1	United States	1	1	2	4
2	Austria*	1	1	0	2
3	Great Britain	1	0	1	2
4	Soviet Union	1	0	0	1
5	East Germany	0	1	0	1
5	West Germany	0	1	0	1
7	Czechoslovakia	0	0	1	1
Totals (7 entries)		4	4	4	12

== Results ==
=== Men ===
Rank	Name	Points	Places
1	(Austria) Emmerich Danzer	2263.1	16
2	(Austria) Wolfgang Schwarz	2266.9	16
3	(United States) Gary Visconti	2209.4	33
4	(Canada) Donald Knight	2206.2	35
5	(United States) Scott Allen	2203.8	35
6	(Czechoslovakia) Ondrej Nepela	2115.8	61
7	(France) Patrick Péra	2124.8	61
8	(West Germany) Peter Krick	2076.9	77
9	(United States) Timothy Wood	2074.8	78
10	(France) Robert Dureville	2053.6	87
11	(East Germany) Günter Zöller	1989.5	104
12	(Canada) Jay Humphrey		106
13	(Soviet Union) Sergey Chetverukhin	1937.8	121
14	(Czechoslovakia) Marian Filc		123
15	(Austria) Günter Anderl		132
16	(United Kingdom) Michael Williams		145
17	(Japan) Tsuguhiko Kodzuka		150
18	(Japan) Masato Tamura		164
19	(Switzerland) Tony Berntier		170
20	(Switzerland) Daniel Höner		175

Judges:

- (Czechoslovakia) Milan Duchón
- (Canada) Donald Gilchrist
- (Hungary) Pál Jaross
- (East Germany) Carla Listing
- (Japan) Kinuko Ueno
- (France) Néri Valdes
- (United States) Jane Vaughn
- (Austria) Franz Wojtanowskyj
- (West Germany) János Zsigmondy

=== Ladies ===
Rank	Name	Points	Places
1	(United States) Peggy Fleming	2273.4	9
2	(East Germany) Gabriele Seyfert	2179.4	21
3	(Czechoslovakia) Hana Mašková	2151.2	29
4	(Canada) Valerie Jones	2143.2	35
5	(Japan) Kumiko Ōkawa	2116.5	42
6	(United Kingdom) Sally-Anne Stapleford	2060.8	59
7	(United States) Albertina Noyes	2068.7	59
8	(United States) Jennie Welsh	1999.9	83
9	(Austria) Beatrix Schuba	1979.5	86
10	(Canada) Roberta Laurent	1997.9	88
11	(West Germany) Monika Feldmann		95
12	(Canada) Karen Magnussen		99
13	(Italy) Rita Trapanese		130
14	(East Germany) Martina Clausner	1877.5	132
15	(Soviet Union) Yelena Shcheglova	1868.1	137
16	(Czechoslovakia) Marie Víchová		141
17	(France) Micheline Joubert		145
18	(France) Sylvaine Duban		164
19	(East Germany) Beate Richter	1831.9	165
20	(Switzerland) Charlotte Walter		172
21	(Hungary) Zsuzsa Szentmiklóssy		188
22	(Socialist Federal Republic of Yugoslavia) Katjuša Derenda		198
WD	(Japan) Miwa Fukuhara		DNF

Judges:

- (Italy) Sonia Bianchetti
- (Czechoslovakia) Gerhardt Bubník
- (Canada) Donald B. Cruikshank
- (United Kingdom) Pamela Davis
- (Switzerland) Karl Enderlin
- (France) Monique Georgelin
- (East Germany) Walburga Grimm
- (Hungary) Éva György
- (United States) M. L. Wright

=== Pairs ===
Rank	Name	Points	Places
1	(Soviet Union) Lyudmila Belousova / Oleg Protopopov	310.6	9
2	(West Germany) Margot Glockshuber / Wolfgang Danne	301.4	25
3	(United States) Cynthia Kauffman / Ronald Kauffman	300.7	27
4	(West Germany) Gudrun Hauss / Walter Häfner	291.0	44
5	(East Germany) Heidemarie Steiner / Heinz-Ulrich Walther	291.8	47
6	(Soviet Union) Tamara Moskvina / Aleksey Mishin	288.8	51
7	(United States) Susan Behrens / Roy Wagelein	290.0	56
8	(Soviet Union) Tatyana Sharanova / Anatoliy Yevdokimov	286.5	65
9	(East Germany) Brigitte Weise / Michael Brychy	268.5	95
10	(Czechoslovakia) Bohunka Šrámková / Jan Šrámek	269.9	99
11	(West Germany) Marianne Streifler / Herbert Wiesinger		103
12	(Austria) Evelyne Schneider / Wilhelm Bietak		104
13	(United States) Betty Lewis / Richard Gilbert		115
14	(Poland) Janina Poremska / Piotr Szczypa		117
15	(Switzerland) Monique Mathys / Yves Ällig		125
16	(Switzerland) Mónika Szabó / Péter Szabó		133
17	(Socialist Federal Republic of Yugoslavia) Anci Dolenc / Mitja Sketa		159
18	(Canada) Betty McKilligan / John McKilligan		162
19	(Czechoslovakia) Dana Fialová / Milos Man		165

Judges:

- (Switzerland) Karl Enderlin
- (Canada) Donald Gilchrist
- (West Germany) Wilhelm Kahle
- (Czechoslovakia) Miroslav Kutina
- (East Germany) Carla Listing
- (Austria) Hans Meixner
- (Soviet Union) Tatyana Tolmachova
- (United States) Jane Vaughn
- (Poland) Maria Zuchowicz

=== Ice dance ===
Rank	Name	Points	Places
1	(United Kingdom) Diane Towler / Bernard Ford	256.8	9
2	(United States) Lorna Dyer / John Carrell	252.1	12
3	(United Kingdom) Yvonne Suddick / Malcolm Cannon	245.5	21
4	(United Kingdom) Janet Sawbridge / Jon Lane	239.0	29
5	(France) Brigitte Martin / Francis Gamichon	235.9	34
6	(Canada) Joni Graham / Don Phillips	227.4	46
7	(Soviet Union) Irina Grishkova / Viktor Ryzhkin	226.5	53
8	(United States) Judy Schwomeyer / James Sladky	224.3	54
9	(United States) Alma Davenport / Roger Berry	220.9	58
10	(West Germany) Angelika Buck / Erich Buck	215.2	71
11	(Czechoslovakia) Jitka Babická / Jaromír Holan		84
12	(East Germany) Annerose Baier / Eberhard Rüger	208.9	88
13	(Soviet Union) Lyudmila Pakhomova / Aleksandr Gorshkov	209.2	92
14	(Hungary) Edit Mató / Károly Csanádi		98
15	(Austria) Heide Mezger / Herbert Rothkappel		103
16	(Canada) Judy Henderson / John Bailey		106
17	(Czechoslovakia) Dana Novotná / Jaroslav Hainz		119
18	(Italy) Susanna Carpani / Sergio Pirelli		120

Judges:

- (Czechoslovakia) Milan Duchón
- (Canada) Frances Gunn
- (United Kingdom) Robert S. Hudson
- (Austria) Hans Kutschera
- (France) Lysiane Lauret
- (West Germany) Hermann Wollersen
- (United States) M. L. Wright
