= 1968 World Figure Skating Championships =

Annual figure skating competition held in 1968

- Type: ISU Championship
- Date: February 27 – March 3
- Season: 1967–68
- Location: Geneva, Switzerland
- Venue: Patinoire des Vernets

Champions
- Men's singles: (Austria) Emmerich Danzer
- Ladies' singles: (United States) Peggy Fleming
- Pairs: (Soviet Union) Lyudmila Belousova / Oleg Protopopov
- Ice dance: (United Kingdom) Diane Towler / Bernard Ford
- Previous: 1967 World Championships
- Next: 1969 World Championships

The 1968 World Figure Skating Championships were held in Geneva, Switzerland from February 27 to March 3. At the event, sanctioned by the International Skating Union, medals were awarded in men's singles, ladies' singles, pair skating, and ice dance.

On the ladies' singles skating Peggy Fleming finished first in the CF and in the FS too, before Gabriele Seyfert. The South African Margaret Betts finished on the last place in both program. On the pair skating Lyudmila Belousova and Oleg Protopopov finished first also in the SP and in the FS, before Tatyana Zhuk and Aleksandr Gorelik. On the ice dance competition Diane Towler and Bernard Ford won in the CD and FD too.

== Medal table ==
* Host nation (Switzerland)

Rank	Nation	Gold	Silver	Bronze	Total
1	Great Britain	1	1	1	3
1	United States	1	1	1	3
3	Soviet Union	1	1	0	2
4	Austria	1	0	0	1
5	East Germany	0	1	0	1
6	Czechoslovakia	0	0	1	1
6	France	0	0	1	1
Totals (7 entries)		4	4	4	12

== Results ==
=== Men ===
Rank	Name	Points	Places
1	(Austria) Emmerich Danzer	2195.2	12
2	(United States) Timothy Wood	2180.9	15
3	(France) Patrick Péra	2090.1	38
4	(United States) Scott Allen	2095.1	38
5	(United States) Gary Visconti	2086.1	41
6	(Czechoslovakia) Ondrej Nepela	2052.5	52
7	(Canada) Jay Humphry	2047.3	57
8	(West Germany) Peter Krick	1989.4	79
9	(Soviet Union) Sergey Chetverukhin	1978.1	83
10	(Canada) David McGillivray	1963.7	93
11	(East Germany) Günter Zöller		94
12	(France) Philippe Pélissier		106
13	(United Kingdom) Michael Williams		117
14	(Japan) Tsuguhiko Kodzuka		128
15	(Czechoslovakia) Marian Filc		133
16	(Italy) Giordano Abbondati		142
17	(West Germany) Reinhard Ketterer		154
18	(Austria) Günter Anderl		162
19	(Hungary) Jenő Ébert		167
20	(Switzerland) Daniel Höner		179

- Referee: (Switzerland) Karl Enderlin
- Assistant Referee: (West Germany) János Zsigmondy

Judges:

- (Czechoslovakia) Miroslav Hasenöhrl
- (Japan) Masao Hasegawa
- (Austria) Franz Heinlein
- (Canada) William Lewis
- (United States) Yvonne S. McGowan
- (West Germany) Eva Neeb
- (United Kingdom) Mollie Phillips
- (France) Néri Valdes
- (East Germany) Helga Wiecki

=== Ladies ===
Rank	Name	Points	Places
1	(United States) Peggy Fleming	2269.7	9
2	(East Germany) Gabriele Seyfert	2179.8	19
3	(Czechoslovakia) Hana Mašková	2121.3	29
4	(Austria) Beatrix Schuba	2094.1	35
5	(Japan) Kumiko Ōkawa	2054.2	46
6	(United States) Albertina Noyes	2025.5	59
7	(Canada) Karen Magnussen	2016.6	62
8	(Hungary) Zsuzsa Almássy	1985.7	74
9	(United States) Janet Lynn	1961.5	89
10	(Soviet Union) Yelena Shcheglova	1954.5	89
11	(West Germany) Monika Feldmann		94
12	(United Kingdom) Patricia Dodd		107
13	(Canada) Linda Carbonetto		117
14	(Czechoslovakia) Marie Víchová		133
15	(Austria) Elisabeth Nestler		139
16	(Switzerland) Charlotte Walter		148
17	(East Germany) Martina Clausner		147
18	(Japan) Kazumi Yamashita		156
19	(Japan) Haruko Ishida		158
20	(East Germany) Sonja Morgenstern		183
21	(Australia) Mary-Ellen Holland		186
22	(South Africa) Margaret Betts		198

- Referee: (Czechoslovakia) Josef Dědič
- Assistant Referee: (Italy) Sonia Bianchetti

Judges:

- (Czechoslovakia) Gerhardt Bubník
- (Australia) Sydney R. Croll
- (Hungary) Ferenc Kertész
- (Japan) Haruo Konno
- (Austria) Hans Kutschera
- (East Germany) Carla Listing
- (Canada) Joan Maclagan
- (United Kingdom) Pamela Peat
- (United States) Edith M. Shoemaker

=== Pairs ===
Rank	Name	Points	Places
1	(Soviet Union) Lyudmila Belousova / Oleg Protopopov	315.9	9
2	(Soviet Union) Tatyana Zhuk / Aleksandr Gorelik	311.2	19
3	(United States) Cynthia Kauffman / Ronald Kauffman	304.3	31
4	(Soviet Union) Tamara Moskvina / Aleksey Mishin	303.6	35
5	(East Germany) Heidemarie Steiner / Heinz-Ulrich Walther	299.0	48
6	(West Germany) Gudrun Hauss / Walter Häfner	295.0	54
7	(Czechoslovakia) Bohunka Šrámková / Jan Šrámek	293.9	58
8	(United States) Sandi Sweitzer / Roy Wagelein	290.2	72
9	(East Germany) Irene Müller / Hans-Georg Dallmer	286.7	80
10	(Czechoslovakia) Liana Drahová / Peter Bartosiewicz	279.4	98
11	(United States) Alicia Starbuck / Kenneth Shelley		99
12	(West Germany) Marianne Streifler / Herbert Wiesinger		110
13	(Canada) Betty McKilligan / John McKilligan		118
14	(East Germany) Brigitte Weise / Michael Brychy		128
15	(Switzerland) Mónika Szabó / Péter Szabó		129
16	(Poland) Janina Poremska / Piotr Szczypa		136
17	(South Africa) Glenda O'Shea / Brian O'Shea		153
WD	(West Germany) Margot Glockshuber / Wolfgang Danne		DNF

- Referee: (United Kingdom) Alexander Gordon
- Assistant Referee: (Switzerland) Jakob Biedermann

Judges:

- (Czechoslovakia) Gerhardt Bubník
- (West Germany) Wilhelm Kahle
- (Canada) William Lewis
- (East Germany) Carla Listing
- (United States) Yvonne S. McGowan
- (United Kingdom) Pamela Peat
- (Poland) Oskar Schubert
- (Switzerland) Rolf J. Steinmann
- (Soviet Union) Sergey Vasilyev

=== Ice dance ===
Rank	Name	Points	Places
1	(United Kingdom) Diane Towler / Bernard Ford	332.9	9
2	(United Kingdom) Yvonne Suddick / Malcolm Cannon	319.8	24
3	(United Kingdom) Janet Sawbridge / Jon Lane	319.7	24
4	(United States) Judy Schwomeyer / James Sladky	311.8	40
5	(Soviet Union) Irina Grishkova / Viktor Ryzhkin	310.9	43
6	(Soviet Union) Lyudmila Pakhomova / Aleksandr Gorshkov	307.9	49
7	(United States) Vicki Camper / Eugene Heffron	298.3	65
8	(West Germany) Angelika Buck / Erich Buck	291.4	78
9	(Canada) Joni Graham / Don Phillips	289.0	82
10	(East Germany) Annerose Baier / Eberhard Rüger	285.0	85
11	(Hungary) Edit Mató / Károly Csanádi		101
12	(Czechoslovakia) Milena Tůmová / Josef Pešek		111
13	(Canada) Donna Taylor / Bruce Lennie		112
14	(Italy) Susanna Carpani / Sergio Pirelli		124
15	(France) Claude Couste / Jean-Pierre Noullet		133

- Referee: (France) Henri Meudec
- Assistant Referee: (Czechoslovakia) Emil Skákala

Judges:

- (East Germany) Terese Birke
- (Canada) Frances Gunn
- (Czechoslovakia) Miroslav Hasenöhrl
- (Hungary) Ferenc Kertész
- (France) Lysiane Lauret
- (United Kingdom) Mollie Phillips
- (Switzerland) Margrit Rellstab
- (United States) Edith M. Shoemaker
- (West Germany) Willi Wernz
