= 1966 European Figure Skating Championships =

Figure skating competition

1966 European Championships
- Type: ISU Championship
- Date: February 1 – 5
- Season: 1965-66
- Location: Bratislava, Czechoslovakia
- Venue: Zimni Stadion

Champions
- Men's singles: (Austria) Emmerich Danzer
- Ladies' singles: (Austria) Regine Heitzer
- Pairs: (Soviet Union) Lyudmila Belousova / Oleg Protopopov
- Ice dance: (United Kingdom) Diane Towler / Bernard Ford
- Previous: 1965 European Championships
- Next: 1967 European Championships

The 1966 European Figure Skating Championships were held in Bratislava, Czechoslovakia from February 1 to 5. Elite senior-level figure skaters from European ISU member nations competed for the title of European Champion in the disciplines of men's singles, ladies' singles, pair skating, and ice dancing.

== Results ==
=== Men ===
Rank	Name	Places
1	(Austria) Emmerich Danzer	
2	(Austria) Wolfgang Schwarz	
3	(Czechoslovakia) Ondrej Nepela	
4	(France) Patrick Péra	
5	(France) Robert Dureville	
6	(East Germany) Ralph Borghard	
7	(Italy) Giordano Abbondati	
8	(Czechoslovakia) Marian Filc	
9	(West Germany) Peter Krick	
10	(Austria) Günter Anderl	
11	(Soviet Union) Valeriy Meshkov	
12	(Soviet Union) Sergey Chetverukhin	
13	(Hungary) Jenő Ébert	
14	(West Germany) Reinhard Ketterer	
15	(United Kingdom) Malcolm Cannon	
16	(Poland) Zdzisław Pieńkowski	
17	(Switzerland) Hans-Jürg Studer	
18	(Sweden) Jan Ullmark	

=== Ladies ===
Rank	Name	Places
1	(Austria) Regine Heitzer	
2	(East Germany) Gabriele Seyfert	
3	(France) Nicole Hassler	
4	(Czechoslovakia) Hana Mašková	
5	(United Kingdom) Diana Clifton-Peach	
6	(Hungary) Zsuzsa Almássy	49
7	(United Kingdom) Sally-Anne Stapleford	
8	(West Germany) Uschi Keszler	
9	(West Germany) Elisabeth Mikula	
10	(West Germany) Angelika Wagner	
11	(East Germany) Beate Richter	
12	(Austria) Elisabeth Nestler	
13	(Switzerland) Pia Zürcher	
14	(Czechoslovakia) Alena Augustová	
15	(East Germany) Martina Clausner	
16	(France) Micheline Joubert	
17	(Soviet Union) Yelena Shcheglova	
18	(Italy) Rita Trapanese	
19	(Sweden) Britt Elfving	
20	(France) Denise Neanne	
21	(United Kingdom) Sylvia Oundjian	
22	(Poland) Elżbieta Kościk	
23	(Finland) Anna-Maija Rissanen	

=== Pairs ===
Rank	Name	Places
1	(Soviet Union) Lyudmila Belousova / Oleg Protopopov	
2	(Soviet Union) Tatyana Zhuk / Aleksandr Gorelik	
3	(West Germany) Margot Glockshuber / Wolfgang Danne	
4	(Soviet Union) Tatyana Tarasova / Georgiy Proskurin	
5	(East Germany) Irene Müller / Hans-Georg Dallmer	
6	(West Germany) Gudrun Hauss / Walter Häfner	
7	(West Germany) Sonja Pfersdorf / Günther Matzdorf	
8	(East Germany) Heidemarie Steiner / Heinz-Ulrich Walther	
9	(East Germany) Brigitte Weise / Michael Brychy	
10	(Switzerland) Monique Mathys / Yves Ällig	
11	(Austria) Gerlinde Schönbauer / Wilhelm Bietak	
12	(Switzerland) Mónika Szabó / Péter Szabó	
13	(Czechoslovakia) Agnesa Wlachovská / Peter Bartosiewicz	
14	(Hungary) Mária Csordás / László Kondi	
15	(Austria) Evelyne Schneider / Fery Dedovich	
16	(Czechoslovakia) Bohunka Šrámková / Jan Šrámek	
17	(Italy) Michele Bargauan / Emanuele Gianoli	
18	(Poland) Janina Poremska / Piotr Szczypa	
19	(Socialist Federal Republic of Yugoslavia) Anci Dolenc / Mitja Sketa	

=== Ice dance ===
Rank	Name	Places
1	(United Kingdom) Diane Towler / Bernard Ford	
2	(United Kingdom) Yvonne Suddick / Roger Kennerson	
3	(Czechoslovakia) Jitka Babická / Jaromír Holan	
4	(France) Brigitte Martin / Francis Gamichon	
5	(West Germany) Gabriele Matysik / Rudi Matysik	
6	(United Kingdom) Janet Sawbridge / Jon Lane	
7	(Soviet Union) Lyudmila Pakhomova / Viktor Ryzhkin	
8	(Hungary) Edit Mató / Károly Csanádi	
9	(East Germany) Annerose Baier / Eberhard Rüger	
10	(Czechoslovakia) Sylva Draisaitlová / Miroslav Gřešek	
11	(Austria) Heide Mezger / Georg Felsinger	
12	(Austria) Christel Trebesiner / Herbert Rothkappel	
13	(West Germany) Angelika Buck / Erich Buck	
14	(Italy) Susanna Carpani / Sergio Pirelli	
15	(Netherlands) Truusje Geradts / Ronald du Burck	
16	(Hungary) Ilona Berecz / István Sugár	
