= 1965 European Figure Skating Championships =

Figure skating competition

1965 European Championships
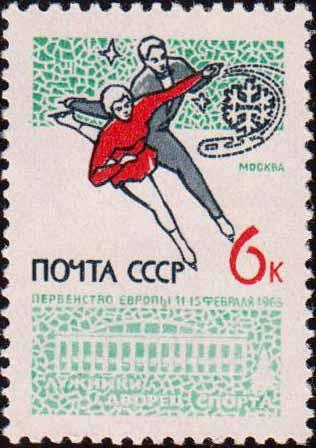
- A Soviet stamp dedicated to the 1965 European Figure Skating Championships
- Type: ISU Championship
- Date: February 11 – 15
- Season: 1964–65
- Location: Moscow, Russia, Soviet Union
- Venue: Palace of Sports of the Central Lenin Stadium

Champions
- Men's singles: (Austria) Emmerich Danzer
- Ladies' singles: (Austria) Regine Heitzer
- Pairs: (Soviet Union) Lyudmila Belousova / Oleg Protopopov
- Ice dance: (Czechoslovakia) Eva Romanová / Pavel Roman
- Previous: 1964 European Championships
- Next: 1966 European Championships

The 1965 European Figure Skating Championships were held at the Palace of Sports of the Central Lenin Stadium in Moscow, Soviet Union from February 11 to 15, 1965. Elite senior-level figure skaters from European ISU member nations competed for the title of European Champion in the disciplines of men's singles, ladies' singles, pair skating, and ice dancing.

== Results ==
=== Men ===
Rank	Name	Points	Places
1	(Austria) Emmerich Danzer	2184.3	14
2	(France) Alain Calmat	2188.3	16
3	(Austria) Peter Jonas	2102.0	29
4	(West Germany) Sepp Schönmetzler	2090.4	32
5	(Austria) Wolfgang Schwarz	2040.9	46
6	(France) Robert Dureville	2010.6	55
7	(West Germany) Peter Krick	1959.8	74
8	(Czechoslovakia) Ondrej Nepela	1952.0	76
9	(France) Philippe Pélissier	1944.1	86
10	(Soviet Union) Sergey Chetverukhin	1914.3	93
11	(Italy) Giordano Abbondati	1917.0	99
12	(East Germany) Günter Zöller	1915.1	100
13	(Czechoslovakia) Marian Filc	1905.4	106
14	(Hungary) Jenő Ébert	1877.7	119
15	(United Kingdom) Hywel Evans	1811.5	137
16	(Switzerland) Hans-Jürg Studer	1782.8	142

=== Ladies ===
Rank	Name	Points	Places
1	(Austria) Regine Heitzer	2288.6	9
2	(United Kingdom) Sally-Anne Stapleford	2191.7	26
3	(France) Nicole Hassler	2178.2	30
4	(Austria) Helli Sengstschmid	2167.1	38
5	(East Germany) Gabriele Seyfert	2165.9	38
6	(United Kingdom) Diana Clifton-Peach	2130.5	51
7	(Czechoslovakia) Hana Mašková	2072.6	72
8	(Czechoslovakia) Jana Mrázková	2038.4	76
9	(Austria) Astrid Czermak	2029.2	82
10	(West Germany) Angelika Wagner	2007.3	86
11	(West Germany) Uschi Keszler	1992.5	92
12	(Hungary) Zsuzsa Szentmiklóssy	1933.6	113
13	(Italy) Sandra Brugnera	1896.8	123
14	(Soviet Union) Tamara Bratus	1867.1	131
15	(Switzerland) Pia Zürcher	1856.6	141
16	(Norway) Karin Dehle	1835.4	142
17	(Sweden) Britt Elfving	1822.9	147
18	(France) Denise Neanne	1819.5	151
19	(Denmark) Marianne Bæk	1744.8	168
20	(Finland) Pia Vingisaar	1642.2	180

=== Pairs ===
Rank	Name	Points	Places
1	(Soviet Union) Lyudmila Belousova / Oleg Protopopov	315.0	9
2	(Switzerland) Gerda Johner / Rüdi Johner	306.9	18
3	(Soviet Union) Tatyana Zhuk / Aleksandr Gorelik	298.8	28
4	(West Germany) Sonja Pfersdorf / Günther Matzdorf	293.8	37
5	(East Germany) Irene Müller / Hans-Georg Dallmer	289.7	46
6	(Soviet Union) Tatyana Tarasova / Georgiy Proskurin	285.7	51
7	(West Germany) Margot Glockshuber / Wolfgang Danne	279.7	66
8	(Czechoslovakia) Agnesa Wlachovská / Peter Bartosiewicz	373.3	78
9	(Austria) Gerlinde Schönbauer / Wilhelm Bietak	272.3	79
10	(Hungary) Mária Csordás / László Kondi	268.8	86
11	(West Germany) Gudrun Hauss / Walter Häfner	263.9	100
12	(Switzerland) Monique Mathys / Yves Ällig	258.1	108
13	(Czechoslovakia) Věra Stehlíková / Karel Fajfr	251.7	123
14	(Austria) Ingeborg Strell / Fery Dedovich	350.9	125
15	(East Germany) Renate Rößler / Klaus Wasserfuhr	248.2	133
16	(United Kingdom) Glenis Parry / John Bayman	246.2	137
17	(Finland) Anna-Maija Rissanen / Ilka Varhee	191.3	153

=== Ice dance ===
Rank	Name	Points	Places
1	(Czechoslovakia) Eva Romanová / Pavel Roman	256.9	7
2	(United Kingdom) Janet Sawbridge / David Hickinbottom	249.4	14
3	(United Kingdom) Yvonne Suddick / Roger Kennerson	242.7	25
4	(United Kingdom) Diane Towler / Bernard Ford	239.5	27
5	(Hungary) Györgyi Korda / Pál Vásárhelyi	231.1	40
6	(West Germany) Gabriele Rauch / Rudi Matysik	228.2	43
7	(Czechoslovakia) Jitka Babická / Jaromír Holan	223.9	50
8	(France) Brigitte Martin / Francis Gamichon	223.6	50
9	(West Germany) Jutta Peters / Wolfgang Kunz	216.6	64
10	(Austria) Christel Trebesiner / Georg Felsinger	212.8	68
11	(East Germany) Annerose Baier / Eberhard Rüger	206.0	79
12	(Hungary) Edit Mató / Károly Csanádi	204.1	84
13	(Soviet Union) Nadezhda Velle / Aleksandr Treshchov	197.0	93
14	(Czechoslovakia) Ludmila Kotkova / Václav Kotek	197.7	94
15	(Austria) Heide Mezger / Herbert Rothkappel	189.7	102
