= Figure skating at the 1964 Winter Olympics =

Figure skating at the IX Winter Olympics
- Type: Olympic Games

Champions
- Men's singles: Manfred Schnelldorfer (EUA)
- Ladies' singles: (Netherlands) Sjoukje Dijkstra
- Pairs: (Soviet Union) Liudmila Belousova / Oleg Protopopov
- Previous: 1960 Winter Olympics
- Next: 1968 Winter Olympics

Figure skating at the 1964 Winter Olympics took place at the Olympiahalle in Innsbruck, Austria. There were three events contested: men's singles, ladies' singles, and pair skating.

On February 15, 1961, the entire United States figure skating team and several family members, coaches, and officials were killed when Sabena Flight 548 crashed in Brussels, Belgium, en route to the World Championships in Prague. The accident caused the cancellation of the 1961 World Championships and necessitated the building of a new American skating program. Although American figure skaters were still too young in 1964 (most were aged 15 or lower), they still managed to win two medals.

== Medal table ==
Rank	Nation	Gold	Silver	Bronze	Total
1	United Team of Germany	1	1	0	2
2	Netherlands	1	0	0	1
2	Soviet Union	1	0	0	1
4	Canada	0	1	1	2
5	Austria	0	1	0	1
5	France	0	1	0	1
7	United States	0	0	2	2
Totals (7 entries)		3	4	3	10

== Participating nations ==
- Austria (10)
- Canada (12)
- Czechoslovakia (8)
- France (5)
- United Team of Germany (12)
- Great Britain (5)
- Hungary (2)
- Italy (2)
- Japan (4)
- Netherlands (2)
- Norway (2)
- Soviet Union (5)
- Sweden (1)
- Switzerland (8)
- United States (12)

== Results ==
=== Men ===
Rank	Name	Nation	CF	FS	Points	Places
1	Manfred Schnelldorfer	United Team of Germany	1	1	1916.9	13
2	Alain Calmat	France	3	5	1876.5	22
3	Scott Allen	United States	4	4	1873.6	26
4	Karol Divín	Czechoslovakia	2	9	1862.8	32
5	Emmerich Danzer	Austria	5	3	1824.0	42
6	Thomas Litz	United States	13	2	1764.7	77
7	Peter Jonas	Austria	9	6	1752.0	79
8	Nobuo Sato	Japan	8	10	1746.2	88
9	Donald Knight	Canada	7	11	1746.6	85
10	Monty Hoyt	United States	6	12	1755.5	81
11	Ralph Borghard	United Team of Germany	10	7	1742.2	90
12	Sepp Schönmetzler	United Team of Germany	12	8	1743.1	92
13	Charles Snelling	Canada	16	15	1705.5	117
14	Giordano Abbondati	Italy	11	16	1688.4	131
15	Wolfgang Schwarz	Austria	17	13	1695.9	127
16	William Neale	Canada	19	14	1667.7	143
17	Robert Dureville	France	14	19	1660.0	148
18	Hywel Evans	Great Britain	15	22	1640.1	159
19	Markus Germann	Switzerland	20	23	1578.0	186
20	Malcolm Cannon	Great Britain	18	24	1587.5	187
21	Jenő Ébert	Hungary	22	18	1586.9	188
22	Ondrej Nepela	Czechoslovakia	23	17	1590.1	190
23	Philippe Pélissier	France	21	21	1573.8	189
24	Peter Grütter	Switzerland	24	20	1517.2	208
WD	Valeri Meshkov	Soviet Union				
WD	Wouter Toledo	Netherlands				

Referee:

- Henry M. Beatty

Assistant referee:

- Oskar Madl

Judges:

- (West Germany) Adolf Walker
- (France) Gérard Rodrigues Henriques
- (United Kingdom) Geoffrey S. Yates
- (Italy) Sonia Bianchetti
- (Canada) William Lewis
- (Austria) Franz Wojtanowskyj
- (Czechoslovakia) Emil Skákala
- (United States) Ardelle Sanderson
- (Soviet Union) Sergei Vasiliev

=== Ladies ===
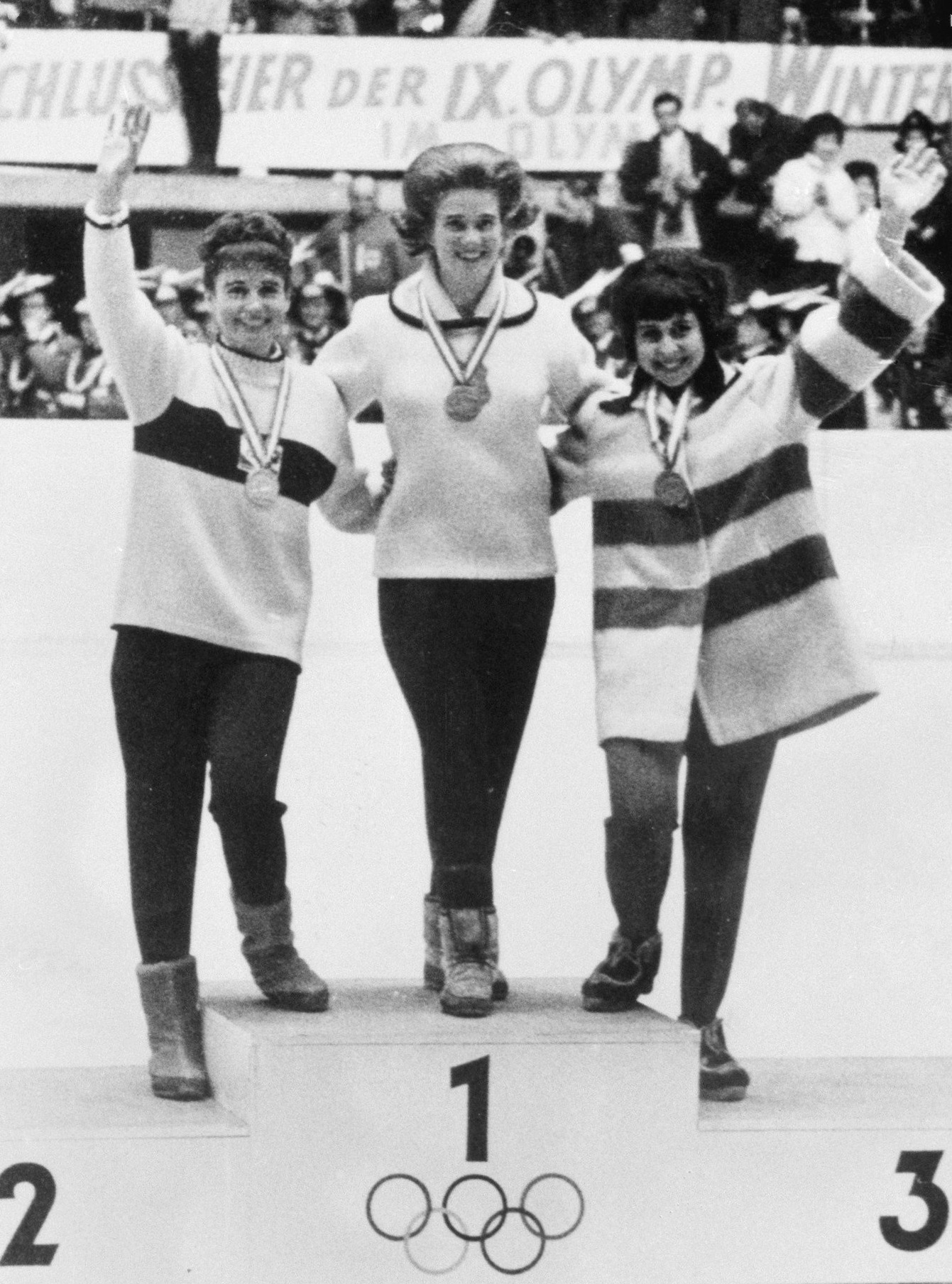
Left-right: Regine Heitzer, Sjoukje Dijkstra, Petra Burka

Rank	Name	Nation	CF	FS	Points	Places
1	Sjoukje Dijkstra	Netherlands	1	1	2018.5	9
2	Regine Heitzer	Austria	2	5	1945.5	22
3	Petra Burka	Canada	3	2	1940.0	25
4	Nicole Hassler	France	5	4	1887.7	38
5	Miwa Fukuhara	Japan	4	9	1845.1	50
6	Peggy Fleming	United States	8	6	1819.6	59
7	Christine Haigler	United States	6	15	1803.8	74
8	Albertina Noyes	United States	9	7	1798.9	73
9	Helli Sengstschmid	Austria	18	3	1782.1	85
10	Wendy Griner	Canada	13	8	1775.3	91
11	Sally-Anne Stapleford	Great Britain	7	19	1757.9	108
12	Shirra Kenworthy	Canada	10	16	1756.3	104
13	Kumiko Okawa	Japan	15	11	1725.4	136
14	Inge Paul	United Team of Germany	17	12	1720.3	139
15	Hana Mašková	Czechoslovakia	19	10	1714.8	142
16	Carol-Ann Warner	Great Britain	12	22	1692.9	162
17	Zsuzsa Almássy	Hungary	20	14	1702.2	159
18	Diana Clifton-Peach	Great Britain	11	25	1711.7	152
19	Gabriele Seyfert	United Team of Germany	21	17	1685.1	177
20	Ingrid Ostler	Austria	16	20	1684.8	171
21	Ann-Margreth Frei-Käck	Sweden	26	13	1661.1	191
22	Junko Ueno	Japan	14	26	1685.0	170
23	Franziska Schmidt	Switzerland	22	21	1662.8	193
24	Uschi Keszler	United Team of Germany	25	18	1642.3	213
25	Jana Mrázková	Czechoslovakia	23	24	1646.4	205
26	Sandra Brugnera	Italy	27	23	1612.5	221
27	Monika Zingg	Switzerland	28	28	1568.9	248
28	Anne Karin Dehle	Norway	24	30	1571.9	248
29	Genevieve Burdel	France	29	27	1542.0	255
30	Berit Unn Johansen	Norway	30	29	1524.9	265

Referee:

- Elemér Terták

Assistant referee:

- Karl Enderlin

Judges:

- (West Germany) Ernst Bauch
- (France) Néri Valdes
- (United Kingdom) Pamela Davis
- (Japan) Masao Hasegawa
- (Canada) Suzanne Francis
- (Netherlands) C. Paul Engelfriet
- (Austria) Edwin Kucharz
- (Sweden) Gunvor Toreskog
- (Switzerland) Walter Fritz (CF only)
- (Czechoslovakia) Emil Skákala (FS only)

=== Pairs ===
At the 1964 Olympics, Kilius/Bäumler, Wilkes/Revell, and Joseph/Joseph placed second, third, and fourth respectively. In 1966, Kilius/Bäumler's results were invalidated after it was discovered that they had signed professional contracts before the Olympics. At the time, only amateurs were allowed to compete in the Olympic Games. The silver medals were transferred to Wilkes/Revell and the bronze medals to Joseph/Joseph. The Germans were re-awarded the silvers in 1987, after appealing that other pairs had signed similar contracts but had not been exposed and disqualified. The placements of Wilkes/Revell and Joseph/Joseph remained unclear for many years. In December 2013, the IOC clarified that the Canadian pair had not been stripped of their silver after the Germans regained their medals. In November 2014, the IOC stated that both the German and Canadian pairs are the silver medalists and the Americans are the bronze medalists.

Rank	Name	Nation	Points	Places
1	Liudmila Belousova / Oleg Protopopov	Soviet Union	104.4	13
2	Marika Kilius / Hans-Jürgen Bäumler	United Team of Germany	103.6	15
2	Debbi Wilkes / Guy Revell	Canada	98.5	35.5
3	Vivian Joseph / Ronald Joseph	United States	98.2	35.5
5	Tatiana Zhuk / Alexander Gavrilov	Soviet Union	96.6	45
6	Gerda Johner / Rüdi Johner	Switzerland	95.4	56
7	Judianne Fotheringill / Jerry Fotheringill	United States	94.7	69.5
8	Cynthia Kauffman / Ronald Kauffman	United States	92.8	74
9	Agnesa Wlachovská / Peter Bartosiewicz	Czechoslovakia	91.8	84
10	Milada Kubíková / Jaroslav Votruba	Czechoslovakia	88.9	97
11	Brigitte Wokoeck / Heinz-Ulrich Walther	United Team of Germany	88.8	103.5
12	Gerlinde Schönbauer / Wilhelm Bietak	Austria	87.7	108
13	Margit Senf / Peter Göbel	United Team of Germany	87.9	113.5
14	Faye Strutt / Jim Watters	Canada	85.3	122.5
15	Inge Strell / Ferry Dedovich	Austria	83.6	129
16	Linda Ann Ward / Neil Carpenter	Canada	84.2	128.5
17	Monique Mathys / Yves Ällig	Switzerland	81.5	147.5

Referee:

- Ernst Labin

Assistant referee:

- Alexander D.C. Gordon

Judges:

- (West Germany) Erika Schiechtl
- (France) Néri Valdes
- (Italy) Michele Beltrami
- (Canada) Suzanne Francis
- (Netherlands) C. Paul Engelfriet
- (Austria) Hans Meixner
- (Switzerland) Walter Fritz
- (Czechoslovakia) Dagmar Řeháková
- (United States) Mary Louise Wright
- (Soviet Union) Sergei Vasiliev
