= Figure skating at the 1968 Winter Olympics =

Figure skating at the Winter Olympics
- Type: Olympic Games
- Venue: Le Stade Olympique de Glace

Champions
- Men's singles: (Austria) Wolfgang Schwarz
- Ladies' singles: (United States) Peggy Fleming
- Pairs: (Soviet Union) Liudmila Belousova / Oleg Protopopov
- Previous: 1964 Winter Olympics
- Next: 1972 Winter Olympics

Figure skating at the 1968 Winter Olympics was held at Le Stade Olympique de Glace in Grenoble, France. Ice dance, then known as "rhythmic skating," was a demonstration event and was won by the team of Diane Towler and Bernard Ford of Great Britain. It became a medal event eight years later in 1976 Innsbruck.

American figure skater Peggy Fleming built up a huge lead after the compulsory figures and won the first-place votes of all nine judges. Her victory marked the first gold medal won by an American after the death of an entire US figure skating team in an air crash in 1961, and heralded an American figure skating renaissance.

== Medal table ==
Rank	Nation	Gold	Silver	Bronze	Total
1	Soviet Union	1	1	0	2
1	United States	1	1	0	2
3	Austria	1	0	0	1
4	East Germany	0	1	0	1
5	Czechoslovakia	0	0	1	1
5	France	0	0	1	1
5	West Germany	0	0	1	1
Totals (7 entries)		3	3	3	9

== Results ==
=== Men ===
Rank	Name	Nation	CF	FS	Points	Places
1	Wolfgang Schwarz	Austria	1	2	1904.1	13
2	Tim Wood	United States	2	3	1891.6	17
3	Patrick Péra	France	3	7	1864.5	31
4	Emmerich Danzer	Austria	4	1	1873.0	29
5	Gary Visconti	United States	6	5	1810.2	52
6	John Misha Petkevich	United States	8	4	1806.2	56
7	Jay Humphry	Canada	9	6	1795.0	63
8	Ondrej Nepela	Czechoslovakia	5	10	1772.8	73
9	Sergei Chetverukhin	Soviet Union	11	11	1737.0	93
10	Marian Filc	Czechoslovakia	13	8	1734.2	97
11	Günter Zöller	East Germany	10	14	1727.9	100
12	Peter Krick	West Germany	7	16	1723.2	104
13	Philippe Pélissier	France	14	12	1706.0	114
14	Giordano Abbondati	Italy	12	18	1690.9	117
15	Michael Williams	Great Britain	15	15	1650.9	147
16	David McGillivray	Canada	21	9	1663.7	139
17	Haig Oundjian	Great Britain	19	13	1639.5	154
18	Sergei Volkov	Soviet Union	16	17	1632.0	158
19	Jenő Ébert	Hungary	17	24	1595.4	180
20	Jacques Mrozek	France	18	20	1601.0	179
21	Tsuguhiko Kozuka	Japan	24	19	1584.0	189
22	Steve Hutchinson	Canada	22	21	1578.3	193
23	Günter Anderl	Austria	20	23	1574.7	193
24	Jürgen Eberwein	West Germany	25	22	1530.3	219
25	Yutaka Higuchi	Japan	23	26	1529.6	218
26	Jan Hoffmann	East Germany	26	25	1437.8	238
27	Thomas Callerud	Sweden	27	27	1399.3	241
28	Lee Gwang-yeong	South Korea	28	28	1360.3	250

Referee:

- Josef Dědič

Assistant referee:

- Sonia Bianchetti

Judges:

- (Austria) Martin Felsenkirch
- (Canada) Ralph S. McCreath
- (Czechoslovakia) Emil Skákala
- (France) Jeanine Donnier-Blanc
- (West Germany) Erika Schiechtl
- (United Kingdom) Geoffrey Yates
- (Italy) Michele Beltrami
- (Japan) Haruo Kanno
- (United States) Yvonne S. McGowan

=== Ladies ===
Rank	Name	Nation	CF	FS	Points	Places
1	Peggy Fleming	United States	1	1	1970.5	9
2	Gabriele Seyfert	East Germany	2	2	1882.3	18
3	Hana Mašková	Czechoslovakia	4	3	1828.8	31
4	Albertina Noyes	United States	5	7	1797.3	40
5	Beatrix Schuba	Austria	3	12	1773.2	51
6	Zsuzsa Almássy	Hungary	6	8	1757.0	57
7	Karen Magnussen	Canada	10	4	1759.4	63
8	Kumiko Okawa	Japan	8	5	1763.6	61
9	Janet Lynn	United States	14	6	1698.7	90
10	Monika Feldmann	West Germany	11	13	1687.1	99
11	Sally-Anne Stapleford	Great Britain	7	17	1680.9	105
12	Elena Shcheglova	Soviet Union	13	10	1670.4	110
13	Linda Carbonetto	Canada	24	9	1662.9	111
14	Kazumi Yamashita	Japan	15	14	1639.0	139
15	Patricia Dodd	Great Britain	9	27	1634.6	140
16	Galina Grzhibovskaya	Soviet Union	25	11	1628.5	144
17	Petra Ruhrmann	West Germany	16	18	1611.2	161
18	Elisabeth Mikula	Austria	17	19	1612.5	164
19	Eileen Zillmer	West Germany	12	23	1600.3	171
20	Micheline Joubert	France	28	15	1594.8	182
21	Marie Víchová	Czechoslovakia	20	16	1580.4	187
22	Charlotte Walter	Switzerland	21	26	1571.5	202.5
23	Elisabeth Nestler	Austria	26	21	1562.6	208
24	Frances Waghorn	Great Britain	22	28	1557.2	211
25	Rita Trapanese	Italy	27	24	1549.2	216.5
26	Haruko Ishida	Japan	18	25	1552.7	218
27	Sylvaine Duban	France	19	29	1551.4	219
28	Sonja Morgenstern	East Germany	29	22	1475.9	251
29	Beatrice Huștiu	Romania	31	20	1457.2	257
30	Lee Hyeon-ju	South Korea	30	30	1359.9	271
31	Kim Hye-gyeong	South Korea	32	31	1336.2	277
WD	Lyndsai Cowan	Canada	23			

Referee:

- Karl Enderlin

Assistant referee:

- Néri Valdes

Judges:

- (Austria) Martin Felsenkirch
- (Czechoslovakia) Dagmar Řeháková
- (East Germany) Carla Listing
- (West Germany) János Zsigmondy
- (United Kingdom) Mollie Phillips
- (Hungary) Éva György
- (Japan) Masao Hasegawa
- (United States) Norman E. Fuller
- (Soviet Union) Konstantin Likharev

=== Pairs ===
Rank	Name	Nation	SP	FS	Points	Places
1	Liudmila Belousova / Oleg Protopopov	Soviet Union	1	1	315.2	10
2	Tatiana Zhuk / Alexander Gorelik	Soviet Union	2	2	312.3	17
3	Margot Glockshuber / Wolfgang Danne	West Germany	3	3	304.4	30
4	Heidemarie Steiner / Heinz-Ulrich Walther	East Germany	4	4	303.1	37
5	Tamara Moskvina / Alexei Mishin	Soviet Union	6	5	300.3	44
6	Cynthia Kauffman / Ronald Kauffman	United States	5	7	297.0	58
7	Sandi Sweitzer / Roy Wagelein	United States	8	6	294.5	64.5
8	Gudrun Hauss / Walter Häfner	West Germany	7	9	293.6	67
9	Irene Müller / Hans-Georg Dallmer	East Germany	9	8	289.4	82
10	Bohunka Šrámková / Jan Šrámek	Czechoslovakia	10	10	285.8	91.5
11	Marianne Streifler / Herbert Wiesinger	West Germany	12	11	282.7	100
12	Liana Drahová / Peter Bartosiewicz	Czechoslovakia	11	15	276.8	116
13	JoJo Starbuck / Kenneth Shelley	United States	14	12	276.0	121
14	Janina Poremska / Piotr Sczypa	Poland	13	14	274.1	120
15	Evelyne Schneider / Wilhelm Bietak	Austria	15	13	272.2	129
16	Anna Forder / Richard Stephens	Canada	16	16	269.2	138
17	Betty McKilligan / John McKilligan	Canada	17	17	254.8	154
18	Linda Bernard / Ray Wilson	Great Britain	18	18	251.2	160

Referee:

- Gérard Rodrigues Henriques

Assistant referee:

- Donald H. Gilchrist

Judges:

- (Austria) Franz Wojtanowskyj
- (Canada) Ralph S. McCreath
- (Czechoslovakia) Emil Skákala
- (France) Monique Georgelin
- (East Germany) Carla Listing
- (West Germany) Wilhelm Kahle
- (Poland) Maria Zuchowicz
- (United States) Yvonne S. McGowan
- (Soviet Union) Tatiana Tolmacheva
