= 1968 in sports =

1968 in sports describes the year's events in world sport.

== Alpine skiing ==
- Alpine Skiing World Cup:
  - Men's overall champion: Jean-Claude Killy, France
  - Women's overall champion: Nancy Greene, Canada

== American football ==
- Super Bowl II – the Green Bay Packers (NFL) won 33–14 over the Oakland Raiders (AFL)
  - Location: Miami Orange Bowl
  - Attendance: 75,546
  - MVP: Bart Starr, QB (Green Bay)
- Rose Bowl (1967 season):
  - The Southern California Trojans won 14–3 over the Indiana Hoosiers to win the college football national championship
- The Cincinnati Bengals were formed
- November 17 – The Oakland Raiders score two consecutive touchdowns in the last minute of the fourth quarter to beat the New York Jets 43–32, in the infamous "Heidi Game".

O. J. Simpson, running back for the USC Trojans, was the overwhelming choice for the Heisman Trophy, with 2,853 points. Second was Leroy Keyes, running back for Purdue, with 1,103 points, followed by Terry Hanratty (QB-Notre Dame), Ted Kwalick (TE-Penn State) and Ted Hendricks (DE-Miami).

== Association football ==
- Brazil – First Division Champions: Botafogo FR
- England – First Division Champions: Manchester City F.C.
- England – FA Cup – West Bromwich Albion 1–0 Everton
- Scotland – First Division Champions: Celtic F.C.
- Scotland – Cup Winners: Dunfermline Athletic F.C. (defeated Heart of Midlothian 3–1)
- European Championship – Italy beat Yugoslavia 2–0 in a replay. The original final ended 1–1.

== Australian rules football ==
- Victorian Football League
  - Carlton wins the 72nd VFL Premiership (Carlton 7.14 (56) d Essendon 8.5 (53))
  - Brownlow Medal awarded to Bob Skilton (South Melbourne)

== Baseball ==
- Kansas City Athletics move to Oakland, California to become the Oakland Athletics.
- January 23 – Joe Medwick is voted into the Baseball Hall of Fame. Medwick won the Triple Crown in 1937 and batted .300 in 14 of 17 seasons.
- January 28 – Goose Goslin and Kiki Cuyler are admitted to the Hall of Fame by unanimous vote of the Special Veterans Committee. Goslin was a career .316 hitter who played in four World Series. Cuyler was a .321 career hitter with four stolen base crowns.
- Denny McLain of the Detroit Tigers became the first pitcher in Major League Baseball to win 30 or more games since Dizzy Dean of the St. Louis Cardinals in 1934. Since McLain, no pitcher has accomplished that feat.
- Bob Gibson of the St. Louis Cardinals recorded a 1.12 Earned Run Average, a live-ball era record, as well as the major league record in 300 or more innings pitched.
- World Series – Detroit Tigers won 4 games to 3 over the St. Louis Cardinals. The Series MVP was Mickey Lolich, Detroit.
- June 24 – Jim Northrup of the Detroit Tigers hits grand slams in consecutive at-bats, 5th and 6th innings.

== Basketball ==
- NCAA Men's Basketball Championship –
  - UCLA wins 78–55 over North Carolina
- NBA Finals –
  - Boston Celtics won 4 games to 2 over the Los Angeles Lakers
- Phoenix Suns, one of National Basketball Association club representative, was founded in Arizona on January 22.

== Boxing ==
- May 8 – Bob Foster knocked out Dick Tiger in the fourth round to win the World Light-Heavyweight Championship.

== Canadian football ==
- Grey Cup – Ottawa Rough Riders won 24–21 over the Calgary Stampeders
- Vanier Cup – Queen's Golden Gaels won 42–14 over the Wilfrid Laurier Golden Hawks

== Cricket ==
- January 31 – Australia secure victory in the Fourth Test match versus India and win the series 4–0
- August 27 – England win the final Test match at The Oval against Australia to tie the series 1–1. Australia retain The Ashes
- August 28 – Basil D'Oliveira is excluded from the MCC South African tour side leading to turmoil in the world of cricket.

== Cycling ==
- Giro d'Italia won by Eddy Merckx of Belgium
- Tour de France – Jan Janssen of the Netherlands
- UCI Road World Championships – Men's road race – Vittorio Adorni of Italy

== Field hockey ==
- Olympic Games (Men's Competition) in Mexico City, Mexico
  - Gold Medal: Pakistan
  - Silver Medal: Australia
  - Bronze Medal: India
- March 9 – In an international women's field hockey match at Wembley Stadium, England. England beat the Netherlands 1–0.

== Figure skating ==
- World Figure Skating Championships –
  - Men's champion: Emmerich Dänzer, Austria
  - Ladies' champion: Peggy Fleming, United States
  - Pair skating champions: Ludmila Belousova & Oleg Protopopov, Soviet Union
  - Ice dancing champions: Diane Towler & Bernard Ford, Great Britain

== Golf ==
Men's professional

- Masters Tournament – Bob Goalby wins after Roberto DeVicenzo makes on a score card error. DeVicenzo writes a 4 instead of the 3 on the 17th hole.
- U.S. Open – Lee Trevino became the first golfer to shoot in the 60s in every round of the U.S. Open.
- British Open – Gary Player
- PGA Championship – Julius Boros
- PGA Tour money leader – Billy Casper – $205,169

Men's amateur

- British Amateur – Michael Bonallack
- U.S. Amateur – Bruce Fleisher

Women's professional

- Women's Western Open – discontinued
- LPGA Championship – Sandra Post became the youngest golfer to ever win an LPGA major tournament by capturing the LPGA Championship.
- U.S. Women's Open – Susie Berning
- Titleholders Championship – not played
- LPGA Tour money leader – Kathy Whitworth – $48,379

== Horse racing ==
Steeplechases

- Cheltenham Gold Cup – Fort Leney
- Grand National – Red Alligator

Flat races

- Australia – Melbourne Cup won by Royal Parma
- Canada – Queen's Plate won by Merger
- France – Prix de l'Arc de Triomphe won by Vaguely Noble
- Ireland – Irish Derby Stakes won by Ribero
- English Triple Crown Races:
  1. 2,000 Guineas Stakes – Sir Ivor
  2. The Derby – Sir Ivor
  3. St. Leger Stakes – Ribero
- United States Triple Crown Races:
  1. Kentucky Derby – Forward Pass
  2. Preakness Stakes – Forward Pass
  3. Belmont Stakes – Stage Door Johnny

== Ice hockey ==
- January 15 – death of Bill Masterton, Canadian ice hockey player, as a result of injury sustained during a game
- Art Ross Trophy as the NHL's leading scorer during the regular season: Stan Mikita, Chicago Black Hawks
- Hart Memorial Trophy – for the NHL's Most Valuable Player: Stan Mikita, Chicago Black Hawks
- Stanley Cup – Montreal Canadiens win four games to none over the St. Louis Blues
- World Hockey Championship
  - Men's champion: Soviet Union defeated Czechoslovakia
- NCAA Men's Ice Hockey Championship – University of Denver Pioneers defeat University of North Dakota Fighting Sioux 4–0 in Duluth, Minnesota

== Rugby league ==
- 1967–68 Kangaroo tour of Great Britain and France
- 1968 New Zealand rugby league season
- 1968 NSWRFL season premiers: South Sydney DRLFC
- 1967–68 Northern Rugby Football League season / 1968–69 Northern Rugby Football League season
- 1968 Rugby League World Cup winners: Australia

== Rugby union ==
- 74th Five Nations Championship series is won by France who complete the Grand Slam

== Snooker ==
- World Snooker Championship challenge match: John Pulman beats Eddie Charlton 39–34

== Swimming ==
- XIX Olympic Games, held in Mexico City (October 17 – October 26)

== Tennis ==
Australia

- Australian Men's Singles Championship – William Bowrey (Australia) defeats Juan Gisbert, Sr. (Spain) 7–5, 2–6, 9–7, 6–4
- Australian Women's Singles Championship – Billie Jean King (USA) defeats Margaret Smith Court (Australia) 6–1, 6–2

England

- Wimbledon Men's Singles Championship – Rod Laver (Australia) defeats Tony Roche (Australia) 6–3, 6–4, 6–2
- Wimbledon Women's Singles Championship – Billie Jean King (USA) defeats Judy Tegart Dalton (Australia) 9–7, 7–5

France

- French Men's Singles Championship – Ken Rosewall (Australia) defeats Rod Laver (Australia) 6–3, 6–1, 2–6, 6–2
- French Women's Singles Championship – Nancy Richey (USA) defeats Ann Haydon Jones (Great Britain) 5–7, 6–4, 6–1

USA

- American Men's Singles Championship – Arthur Ashe (USA) defeats Tom Okker (Netherlands) 14–12, 5–7, 6–3, 3–6, 6–3
- American Women's Singles Championship – Virginia Wade (Great Britain) defeats Billie Jean King (USA) 6–4, 6–2

Events

- The "open era" in tennis begins, as all the Grand Slam events open to professionals for the first time

Davis Cup

- 1968 Davis Cup – United States 4–1 Australia at Memorial Drive Tennis Centre (grass) Adelaide, Australia

== Multi-sport events ==
- 1968 Winter Olympics takes place in Grenoble, France (Feb 6 - Feb 18)
  - Norway wins the most medals (14), and the most gold medals (6)
- 1968 Summer Olympics takes place in Mexico City, Mexico (Oct 12 - Oct 27)
  - United States wins the most medals (107), and the most gold medals (45)
- Fifth Winter Universiade held in Innsbruck, Austria

== Awards ==
- Associated Press Male Athlete of the Year – Denny McLain, Major League Baseball
- Associated Press Female Athlete of the Year – Peggy Fleming, Figure skating

== Births ==
- February 3 – Vlade Divac, Yugoslav and Serbian basketball player
- February 5 – David Flores, Mexican jockey
- March 22 – Javier Castillejo, Spanish boxer
- April 8 – Max Brito, Ivorian rugby union player (died 2022)
- April 16 – Martin Dahlin, Swedish footballer
- April 19 – Fernando Marroquin, Guatemalan Olympic swimmer
- August 6 – Olga Markova, Russian long-distance runner
- December 18 – Mark Cooper, English footballer

== Deaths ==
- April 7 - Jim Clark, 32, racecar driver
- June 9 – Ronnie Duman, 39, US racecar driver (crashed while competing in the Rex Mays 150)
- September 30 – Johan Nyström, 94, Swedish Olympic athlete
