= McKilligan =

McKilligan is a surname. Notable people with the surname include:

- Betty McKilligan (born 1949), Canadian pair skater
- John McKilligan (born 1948), Canadian pair skater

== See also ==
- McGilligan
