= Killigan =

Killigan is a surname. Notable people with the surname include:

- Aria Killigan, from Daybreak (2019 TV series)
- Duff Killigan, from Kim Possible (see List of Kim Possible characters)
- Kip Killigan, Small Soldiers

== See also ==
- Killian
- McKilligan
