= Scottish Women's Volleyball Premier League =

Annual competition

- Current season, competition or edition: 2022–23
- Sport: Volleyball
- Founded: 1968
- First season: 1969
- No. of teams: 8 teams
- Country: Scotland
- Continent: Europe
- Domestic cups: Scottish Cup; Scottish Super Cup
- International cups: CEV Champions League; CEV Cup; CEV Challenge Cup
- Website: http://www.scottishvolleyball.org

The Scottish Women's Volleyball Championship is an annual competition for Scottish women's volleyball teams. It is held as part of the National Volleyball League since the 1968/69 season. Competitions are held in two divisions - the Premier League and League 1.

== Competition formula (Premier League) ==
In the 2021/2022 season, the competition in the Premier League included two stages - preliminary and playoffs. In the preliminary stage 8 teams played a one-round tournament. All qualified for the playoffs and further determined by the elimination system the finalists who played for the championship. In all phases of the playoffs the opponents played one game against each other. For victories 3-0 and 3-1 the teams got 3 points, 3-2 - 2 points, for defeat 2-3 - 1 point, for defeats 0-3 and 1-3 no points were awarded. In the 2021/22 championship, eight teams played in the Premier League: "Su Ragazzi (Glasgow), University of Edinburgh, City of Edinburgh, Aberdeen, Caledonia West (Prestwick/Er), Glasgow International, Edinburgh Jets, University of Edinburgh -2. The City of Edinburgh won the championship title, defeating Su Ragazzi 3-1 in the final. Third place went to Aberdeen.

=== List of Scottish Champions ===
The table below lists all Scottish Champions from season 1968–69 to 2021–22:

Season	Men	Women
1968–69	Dalziel	
1969–70	Edinburgh University	
1970–71	Edinburgh University	
1971–72	Coatbridge YMCA	
1972–73	Dalziel	
1973–74	Telford	
1974–75	Kirkton (Dundee)	
1975–76	Telford	
1976–77	Telford	Coatbridge YMCA
1977–78	Kirkton (Dundee)	Prestwick
1978–79	Telford	Dodds Troon
1979–80	MIM (Telford)	Dodds Troon
1980–81	MIM (Telford)	Telford
1981–82	MIM (Telford)	Telford
1982–83	MIM (Telford)	Telford
1983–84	MIM (Telford)	Telford
1984–85	MIM (Telford)	Team Scottish Farm
1985–86	Krystal Klear (Kilmarnock)	Team Scottish Farm
1986–87	MIM (Telford)	Provincial Insurance
1987–88	Krystal Klear (Kilmarnock)	Kyle
1988–89	Kinleith Plant (Telford)	Adscreen Kyle
1989–90	Krystal Klear (Kilmarnock)	Adscreen Kyle
1990–91	Team Novasport DV	Adscreen Kyle
1991–92	West Coast (Kilmarnock)	Glasgow Powerhouse
1992–93	City of Glasgow Ragazzi	Team Components Bureau
1993–94	City of Glasgow Ragazzi	MCA Powerhouse Cardinals
1994–95	City of Glasgow Ragazzi	MCA Powerhouse Cardinals
1995–96	City of Glasgow Ragazzi	MCA Cardinals
1996–97	City of Glasgow Ragazzi	Su Ragazzi
1997–98	City of Glasgow Ragazzi	Rucanor Jets
1998–99	Kilmarnock	Rucanor Jets
1999–00	Kilmarnock	Troon
2000–01	Kilmarnock	Su Ragazzi
2001–02	Kilmarnock	Troon
2002–03	Kilmarnock	Troon
2003–04	City of Glasgow Ragazzi	Troon
2004–05	City of Glasgow Ragazzi	City of Edinburgh
2005–06	Kilmarnock	City of Edinburgh
2006–07	Kilmarnock	City of Edinburgh
2007–08	Kilmarnock	Su Ragazzi
2008–09	Glasgow Mets	Troon
2009–10	City of Edinburgh	City of Edinburgh
2010–11	Glasgow Mets	City of Edinburgh
2011–12	Kilmarnock	City of Edinburgh
2012–13	City of Edinburgh	City of Edinburgh
2013–14	Edinburgh Jets	City of Edinburgh
2014–15	South Ayrshire	City of Edinburgh
2015–16	City of Glasgow Ragazzi	Su Ragazzi
2016–17	City of Glasgow Ragazzi	Su Ragazzi
2017–18	City of Glasgow Ragazzi	Su Ragazzi
2018–19	City of Glasgow Ragazzi	City of Edinburgh
2019-20	City of Edinburgh	Su Ragazzi
2020-21	No competition due to COVID-19 pandemic	
2021-22	City of Edinburgh	City of Edinburgh
