= Regine Heitzer =

Austrian figure skater

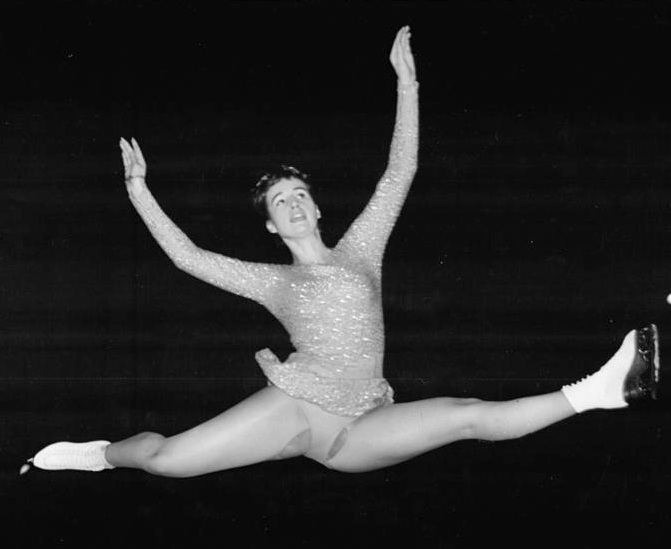
- Regine Heitzer in 1962

Personal information
- Born: 16 February 1944 (age 82)
- Height: 5 ft 7 in (170 cm)

Figure skating career
- Country: Austria
- Skating club: Wien
- Retired: 1973
Medal record
Representing Austria
Olympic Games
Silver medal – second place	1964 Innsbruck	Singles
World Championships
Silver medal – second place	1965 Colorado Springs	Singles
Silver medal – second place	1964 Dortmund	Singles
Silver medal – second place	1963 Cortina d'Ampezzo	Singles
Bronze medal – third place	1962 Prague	Singles
European Championships
Gold medal – first place	1966 Bratislava	Singles
Gold medal – first place	1965 Moscow	Singles
Silver medal – second place	1964 Grenoble	Singles
Bronze medal – third place	1963 Budapest	Singles
Silver medal – second place	1962 Geneva	Singles
Silver medal – second place	1961 Berlin	Singles
Silver medal – second place	1960 Garmisch-Partenkirchen	Singles

Regine Heitzer (born 16 February 1944) is a retired Austrian figure skater. She competed at the 1960 and 1964 Winter Olympics and won a silver medal in the singles event in 1964. Between 1960 and 1965 she also won 11 medals at European and world championships. In 1967 she turned professional and skated for Vienna Ice Revue and Holiday on Ice. She retired in 1971 due to a knee injury and rarely danced since then – in 1979 she skated with Emmerich Danzer to promote the World Championships in Vienna.

In the 1970s she turned to her father's business, wholesale upholstery fabrics, investing her earnings from her professional career. She eventually took over the company and converted it to a furniture store before retiring in 2010. In 1996 she was awarded a Decoration of Honour for Services to the Republic of Austria.

== Results ==
International
Event	1958	1959	1960	1961	1962	1963	1964	1965	1966
Winter Olympics			7th				2nd		
World Championships	12th	7th	4th		3rd	2nd	2nd	2nd	
European Championships	8th	5th	2nd	2nd	2nd	3rd	2nd	1st	1st
National
Austrian Championships			1st	1st	1st	1st	1st	1st	1st
