= Gene Heffron =

American ice dancer

Eugene Heffron
Personal information
- Other names: Gene Heffron
- Born: October 1939 (age 86)

Figure skating career
- Country: United States
- Partner: Vicki Camper

Eugene "Gene" Heffron (born October 1939) is an American former competitive ice dancer. With his skating partner, Vicki Camper, he won silver at the 1968 U.S. Championships and was part of the U.S. ice dancing demonstration team at the 1968 Winter Olympics.

Heffron formerly coached at the Figure Skating Club of the Quad Cities in Davenport, Iowa. On March 28, 2018, his membership with U.S. Figure Skating was suspended pending an investigation by the United States Center for SafeSport. On October 11, 2018, he was banned from membership of U.S. Figure Skating and any sport under the auspices of the U.S. Olympic Committee.

On May 25, 2018, Heffron was charged with three counts of aggravated criminal sexual abuse involving minor students under the age of seventeen. Seven additional counts of aggravated criminal sexual abuse were added on July 11, 2018. He pled not guilty to four counts of aggravated criminal sexual abuse on a child between the ages of 13 and 16 and six counts of aggravated criminal sexual abuse on a child between the ages of 13 and 18. On October 21, 2022, he was found guilty of three counts of aggravated criminal sexual abuse for charges involving one victim. The student was between ages 9 and 15 when the abuse occurred. She was not the only victim, as others had come forward against his abuse. A second skater was also allowed during the trial to tell her account of the defendant’s sexual conduct towards her when she was 15 and 16 years of age. Trial dates for the remaining two victims has not been set.

As of November 14, 2025, Heffron was sentenced to 180 days in county jail and 3 years of probation.
