= Herta Mayen =

Austrian dancer and actress (1922–2015)

- Born: 19 June 1922; Vienna, Austria
- Died: 10 July 2015 (aged 93); Vienna, Austria
- Occupations: Actress, Dancer
- Years active: 1939-1951 (film)

Herta Mayen (1922–2015) was an Austrian dancer and stage and film actress.

== Selected filmography ==
- Hotel Sacher (1939)
- Judgement Day (1940)
- Love Me (1942)
- The Singing House (1948)
- Spring on Ice (1951)

== Bibliography ==
- Fritsche, Maria. Homemade Men In Postwar Austrian Cinema: Nationhood, Genre and Masculinity . Berghahn Books, 2013.
