= Spring on Ice =

1951 film

- Film poster
- German: Frühling auf dem Eis
- Directed by: Georg Jacoby
- Written by: Johannes Mario Simmel
- Starring: Eva Pawlik; Herta Mayen; Hans Holt
- Cinematography: Hanns König
- Edited by: Arnfried Heyne; Leontine Klicka
- Music by: Nico Dostal; Hanns Elin
- Production companies: Wien-Film; Nova-Film
- Distributed by: Universal-Film
- Release date: 10 February 1951
- Running time: 95 minutes
- Country: Austria
- Language: German

Spring on Ice (German: Frühling auf dem Eis) is a 1951 Austrian musical comedy film directed by Georg Jacoby and starring Eva Pawlik, Herta Mayen and Hans Holt. It is set around the Vienna Ice Revue. The film was shot using Agfacolor at the Soviet-controlled Rosenhügel Studios in Vienna. The film's sets were designed by the art director Julius von Borsody.

== Synopsis ==
Herbert Gordon, the director of an ice revue, dismisses skater Eva as she is overshadowing his wife Alida. A radio reporter who loves Eva does his best to help her, but it is only when the other performers go on strike that she is given her chance to shine.

== Cast ==
- Eva Pawlik as Eva
- Herta Mayen as Alida Gordon
- Hans Holt as Thomas Haller
- Oskar Sima as Herbert Gordon
- Harry Fuß as Karl
- Albin Skoda as Manuel
- Karl Skraup as Gottlieb Hinterstoisser
- Robert Tessen as Otto Wagner
- Erich Auer as Hans
- Heinz Conrads as Poldi
- Helmut Janatsch as Franz
- Ilse Trenker as Lucie
- Gaby Philipp as Maria
- Ernst Waldbrunn as night watchman Gruber
- Erich Dörner as Max Gruber
- Joseph Egger as waiter in the wine bar
- Vienna Ice Revue as Themselves
- Rudolf Brix as waiter in the Carlton-Bar
- Fritz Grieb as boy in the Carlton-Bar
- Hanna Löser as girl at Alida
- Felix Pflichther as servant in the Funkhaus
- Erna Schickl as secretary at Wagner
- Emmerich Schrenk as flight adviser
- Walter Sudra as policeman
- Karl Wegersky as waiter in the café
