= Elisabeth Mikula =

Austrian figure skater

Personal information
- Born: 5 March 1951 (age 75) Vienna, Austria

Figure skating career
- Country: Austria
- Skating club: WEV, Vienna
- Retired: c. 1969

Elisabeth Mikula (born 5 March 1951) is an Austrian former competitive figure skater. She competed at the 1968 Winter Olympics in Grenoble, placing 18th, and finished in the top ten at three ISU Championships – 1966 Europeans in Bratislava, Czechoslovakia; 1967 Europeans in Ljubljana, Yugoslavia; and 1969 Europeans in Garmisch-Partenkirchen, West Germany.

== Competitive highlights ==
International
Event	1965–66	1966–67	1967–68	1968–69
Winter Olympics			18th	
World Championships	14th			12th
European Championships	9th	7th	11th	7th
Prague Skate			3rd	
Austrian Championships	2nd	2nd		3rd
