= The Singing House =

- Directed by: Franz Antel
- Written by: Kurt Nachmann; Aldo von Pinelli; Franz Antel
- Produced by: Alexander Julius Sheberko
- Starring: Richard Romanowsky; Hannelore Schroth; Hans Moser
- Cinematography: Oskar Schnirch
- Edited by: Arnfried Heyne
- Music by: Peter Kreuder
- Production company: Kollektiv Film
- Distributed by: Sovexport
- Release date: 23 January 1948
- Running time: 100 minutes
- Country: Austria
- Language: German

The Singing House (German: Das singende Haus) is a 1948 Austrian comedy film directed by Franz Antel and starring Richard Romanowsky, Hannelore Schroth and Hans Moser. It was first shown at the Locarno Film Festival in July 1947, before going on general release in Austria in early 1948.

The film's sets were designed by the art director Julius von Borsody. It was shot at the Rosenhügel Studios in Vienna, which was controlled by the Soviet occupation forces. It was distributed by the East Berlin-based Sovexport.

== Cast ==
- Richard Romanowsky as Professor Cattori
- Hannelore Schroth as Melanie, seine Tochter
- Hans Moser as Franz Huber, Greißler
- Herta Mayen as Gretl, seine Tochter
- Walter Müller as Freddy
- Curd Jürgens as Bandleader Hans Storch
- Paul Kemp as Karli Weidner
- Teddy Kern as Stepanek
- Peter Wehle as Peter
- Karl Skraup as Attila Meisel
- Theodor Danegger as Direktor Hofer
- Susi Nicoletti as Fritzi, seine Sekretärin
- Dorothea Neff as Frl. Streusand
- Hans Wolff as Rotter, Manager

== Bibliography ==
- Fritsche, Maria. Homemade Men in Postwar Austrian Cinema: Nationhood, Genre and Masculinity. Berghahn Books, 2013.
- Von Dassanowsky, Robert. Austrian Cinema: A History. McFarland, 2005.
