= Vienna Ice Revue =

Iconic show blending tradition, sold 1971

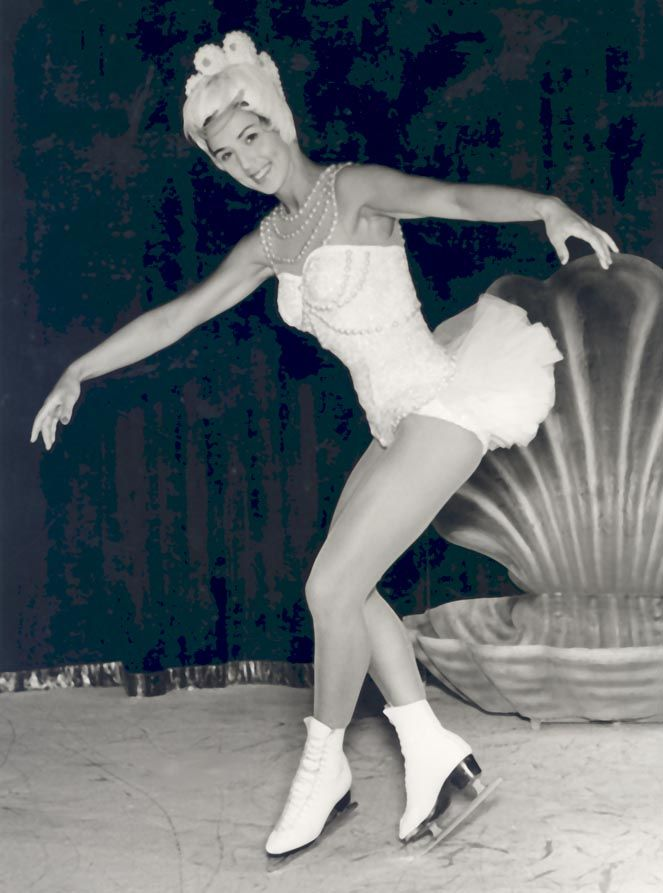
Eva Pawlik (1959)

The Vienna Ice Revue (Wiener Eisrevue) was an internationally highly successful ice show based upon Austria's great figure-skating tradition, presenting a large number of world-class figure skaters mainly from Vienna from 1945 to 1971. Representing a Viennese style, the Vienna Ice Revue was different from the competitor enterprise Holiday on Ice. In 1971 the Vienna Ice Revue was sold to Holiday On Ice and put on the back burner two years later.

== The roots ==
The Wiener Eisrevue (Vienna Ice Revue) had its roots in the success story of Austrian figure skaters before World War II. Karl Schäfer, winner of eight European titles, seven World titles and two Olympic gold medals, was the most successful of these skaters. He had a show that was named after him, the Karl Schäfer-Eisrevue, which also played a major role in the movie The White Dream in 1943. From an artistic point of view, this show was the forerunner of the Vienna Ice Revue.

== The show's creator Will Petter and composer Robert Stolz ==
In 1945, some months after the ending of World War II, the Wiener Eisrevue was founded. Will Petter, the “creator” of the Vienna Ice Revue, and his wife Edith who evolved into the revue's choreographer, carried out their idea of replacing “cold spots” with a story line. In 1952, Robert Stolz began to transpose this concept into music. He was destined to compose 19 “ice operettas” for the Vienna Ice Revue. Music by other composers was also integrated into the program. Most notably, the Blue Danube Waltz by Johann Strauß was played at the end of most productions. In one of the first New Year's Concerts with the Vienna Philharmonic Orchestra to be broadcast on TV, the Vienna Ice revue danced one of the waltzes.

== Touring through Europe ==
The Vienna Ice Revue toured through most European countries including Switzerland, Hungary, Czechoslovakia, Belgium, the Netherlands, Germany, Italy, France and Spain. In 1953, the show made its first appearance in North Africa (Algier and Oran). Adolf Eder was the commercial director. In the middle of the 1950s, the Vienna Ice Revue was one of the first “Western” institutions to appear in Moscow, Kiev and Leningrad following World War II. In Berlin, Antwerp and Moscow, the program was shown annually about 50 times in each city with an audience of about 10,000 people watching each performance. Later, the Vienna Ice Revue also toured Israel and the United States.

== Figure skaters mainly from Austria ==
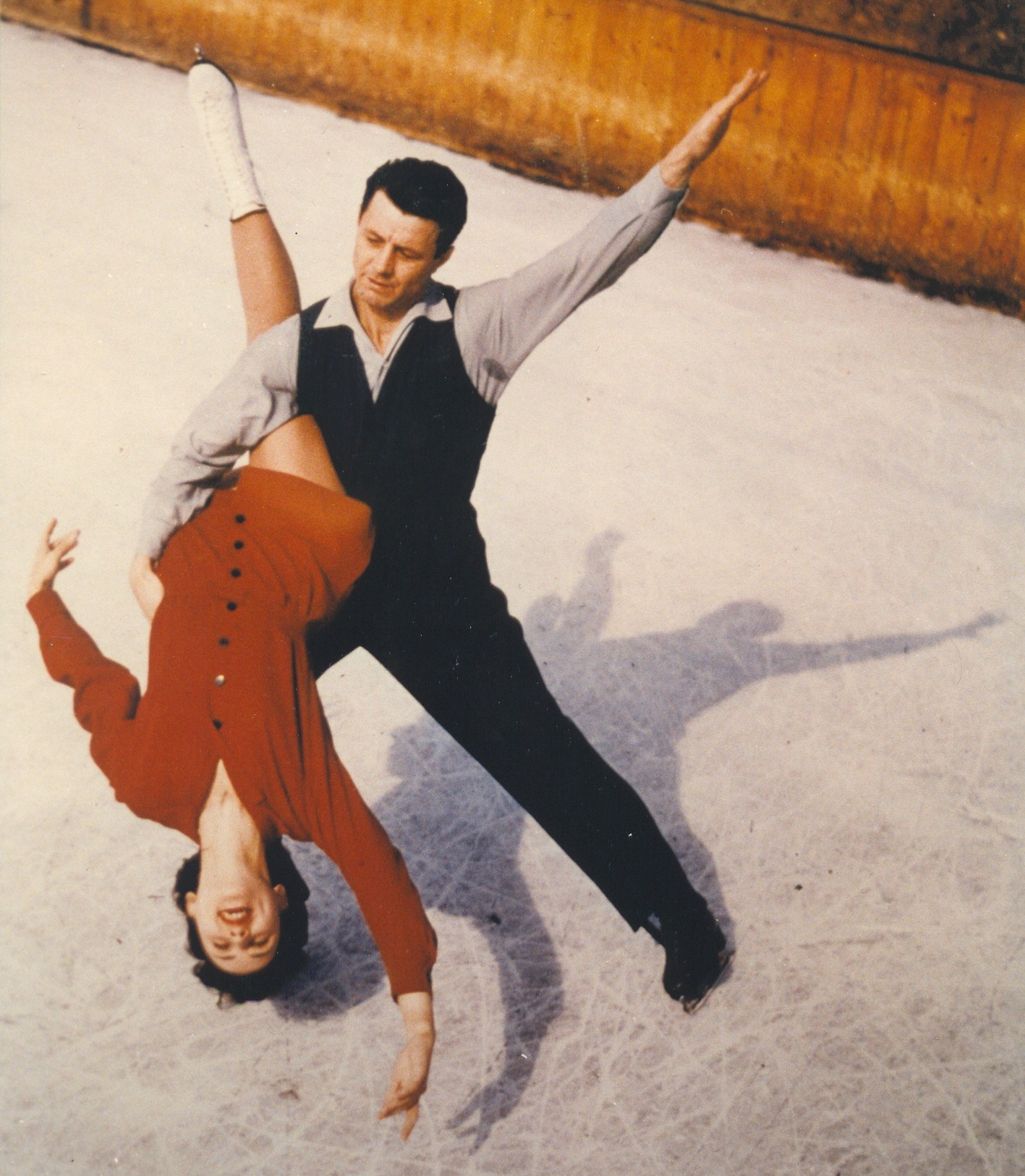
Eva Pawlik and Rudi Seeliger at a rehearsal (1956)

Many world-famous figure skaters from Austria starred in the Vienna Ice Revue such as Olympic runner-up Eva Pawlik (as a single skater and together with Rudi Seeliger as a couple), Olympic runner-up Helmut Seibt, European-, World- and Olympic Champions Sissy Schwarz and Kurt Oppelt, Olympic bronze medalist Ingrid Wendl, World runner-up Champion Hanna Eigel, Olympic runner-up Regine Heitzer and World Champion Emmerich Danzer. World-class figure skaters from Germany that starred in the Vienna Ice Revue were World Champions Marika Kilius and Hans-Jürgen Bäumler and Olympic Champion Manfred Schnelldorfer.

== Three European Champions from Austria in one show ==
From the fall of 1958 to the spring of 1960, the Vienna Ice Revue presented three World runner-up champions and European champions from Austria in one show: Eva Pawlik, Hanna Eigel and Ingrid Wendl, who made her debut as a professional skater in 1958.

== Movies featuring the Vienna Ice Revue ==
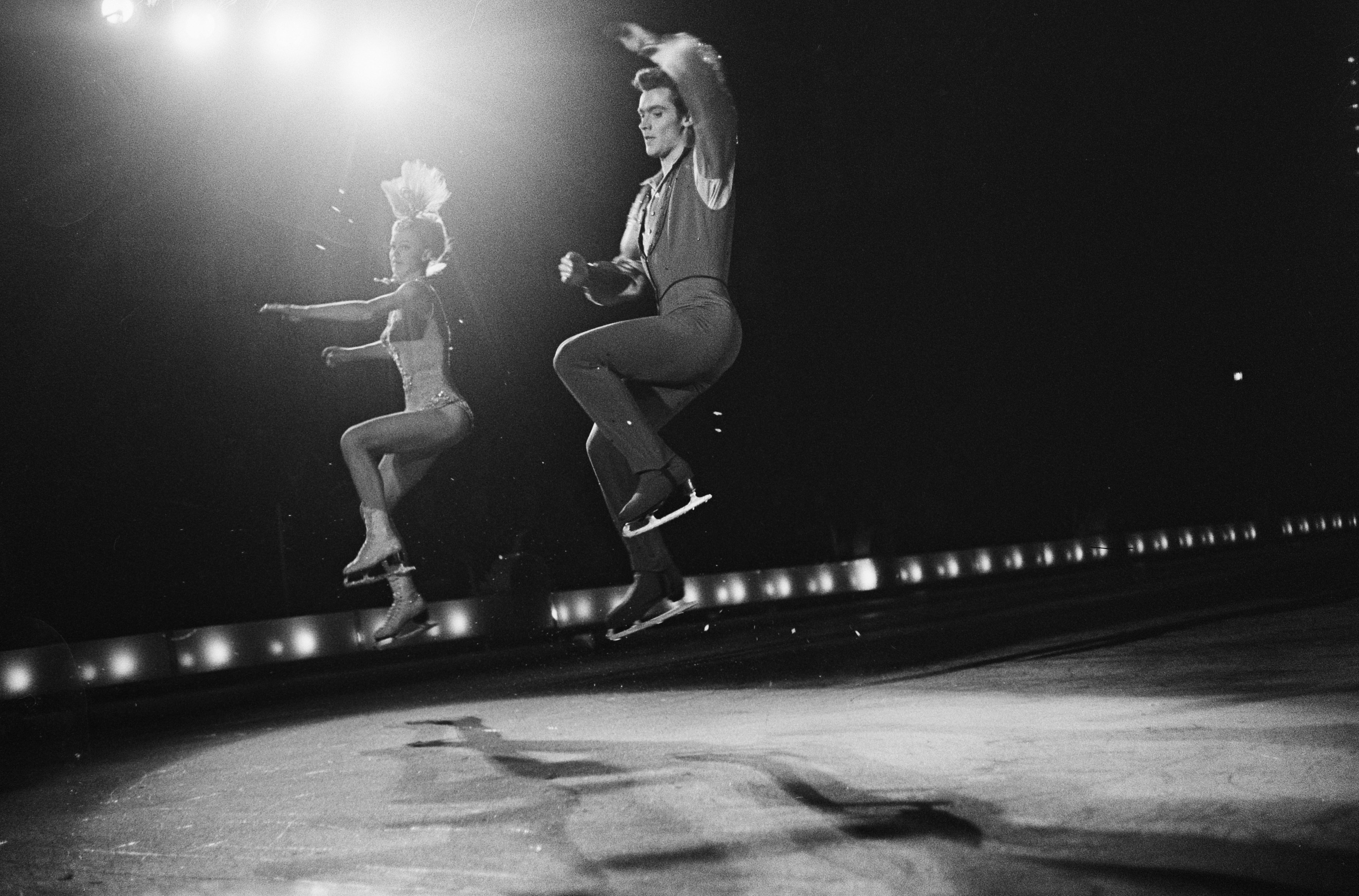
Marika Kilius and Hans-Jürgen Bäumler (1962)

Spring on Ice ("Frühling auf dem Eis"), produced in 1950, was the first movie presenting the Vienna Ice Revue. Eva Pawlik played the main role on the ice and in the frame story together with Austrian actors Hans Holt, Harry Fuß, Oskar Sima, Heinz Conrads and Albin Skoda. Further figure-skating stars presented in this movie: Emmy Puzinger, Hellmut May, Rudi Seeliger, Erni Zlam, Edith Petter and ice clown Bertl Capek.

Symphony in Gold ("Symphonie in Gold"), produced in 1956, presented the European bronze medalist Emmy Puzinger together with Fernand Leemans from Belgium and Jiřina Nekolová from Czechoslovakia who had finished fourth at the 1948 Olympics.

The movie Revue of Dreams ("Traumrevue"), produced in 1959, is a historical figure-skating document showing three European champions on the ice, with two of them performing in the frame story. Eva Pawlik played the role of a fictitious Hungarian figure-skating star. Besides, she was actress Waltraut Haas´ double on the ice. Ingrid Wendl was the second ice star who also played a role in the frame-story. The third European Champion of the Vienna Ice Revue ensemble presented in this movie was Hanna Eigel. Further figure-skating stars presented in this movie: Emmy Puzinger, Fernand Leemans, Rudi Seeliger, Inge and Willi Schilling, Charlotte Michiels and the ice clowns Herbert Bobek and Pieter van Gils.

In the movies Kauf dir einen bunten Luftballon, produced in 1960, and A Star Is Falling From The Sky ("Ein Stern fällt vom Himmel"), produced in 1961, German Champion Ina Bauer played the main role on the ice and in the frame story together with Austrian thrice Olympic skiing Champion Toni Sailer.

In the movies The Great Free Programme ("Die große Kür"), produced in 1964, and The Great Happiness ("Das große Glück"), produced in 1967, twice World Champions and Olympic runners-up Marika Kilius and Hans-Jürgen Bäumler were the main stars on the ice and in the frame story. Further figure-skating stars presented in these movies: Emmy Puzinger and Fernand Leemans, Ingrid Wendl, Helmut Löfke and Norbert Felsinger.

== The show's expiration ==
In 1971, the Vienna Ice Revue slid into a dangerous financial crisis. Morris Chalfen, the boss of Holiday On Ice, bought the enterprise. The Vienna Ice Revue went on dancing under American leadership for two years before the show was finally put on the back burner.

== Sources ==
- Bernhard Hachleitner/Isabella Lechner, Dream Factory On The Ice. From the Vienna Ice Revue to Holiday on Ice. ISBN 978-3-99300-194-0
- Roman Seeliger, Die Wiener Eisrevue. Ein verklungener Traum. (Hölder-Pichler-Tempsky, 1993)
- Roman Seeliger, Die Wiener Eisrevue. Einst Botschafterin Österreichs - heute Legende. (Bezirksmuseum Wien Meidling, 2008)
- Ingrid Wendl, Eis mit Stil. (Jugend und Volk, 1979)
- Ingrid Wendl, Mein großer Bogen. (Böhlau, 2002)

== Articles in newspapers ==
- Manuela Buyny: The Vienna Ice Revue and its greatest star Eva Pawlik In: Pirouette (Magazine for Figure Skating, Germany), issue July/August 2013
- Susan D. Russell: The Vienna Ice Revue. A Showcase Of Champions In: International Figure Skating Magazine (USA), issue June 2010
- Susan D. Russell: Eva Pawlik and Rudi Seeliger (detailed article about Pawlik's and Seeliger's lives including their careers in the Vienna Ice Revue) In: International Figure Skating Magazine (USA), issue January/February 2009
- Hans-Jürgen Bäumler: Congratulation letter for the opening of an exhibition on the Vienna Ice Revue in Vienna, January 2008
- Roman Seeliger: Die Wiener Eisrevue In: dancer's - cultural and lifestyle magazine (Vienna's magazine about ballet and dancing), issue December 2007/January and February 2008
- Ausstellung in Wien: Die Wiener Eisrevue In: Eissportmagazin (Köln), issue December 2007
- Roman Seeliger: Emmy Puzinger gestorben (detailed article about Emmy Puzinger's amateur and show career) In: Pirouette (Magazine for figure skating, Germany), issue July/August 2001
- Ice operettas In: Wiener Zeitung, 23./24.1.2004
- Heinz Brabec: The golden Vienna ice revue age died in 1972 In: Kurier, 13.12.1976
- Walter Schwarz: Vienna Ice Revue was finally closed In: Kurier, 27.6.1973
- Again the stars of the Vienna Ice Revue are glowing In: Passauer Nachrichten,13.8.1970
- Heinz Prüller: War On Ice In: Express, 12.7.1970
- Emmi on professional ice (Emmi is Emmerich Danzer) In: Kronenzeitung, 18.8.1968
- Eva Pawlik performing as a single skater again In: Neues Österreich, 10.8.1960
- The Ice Revue of the great figure skaters - Dr. Eva Pawlik: still the best one In: Der Tag (Berlin), 10. November 1959
- Trude Lang: They are deserving their fees In: Der Montag, 22.12.1958
- Berlin and the Vienna Ice Revue In: Die Presse, 16.12.1958
- Spring On The Ice In: Neues Österreich, 7.2.1951
- Ice Revue is dancing through the whole world. Vienna´s most charming article for export invited to Pretoria, Teheran, South America and Turkey In: Die Presse. 6.1.1951
