= Roger Kennerson =

Yvonne Suddick
Figure skating career
- Country: Great Britain
Medal record
Representing Great Britain
Figure skating: Ice dancing
European Championships
Silver medal – second place	1966 Bratislava	Ice dancing
Bronze medal – third place	1964 Grenoble	Ice dancing
Bronze medal – third place	1965 Moscow	Ice dancing

Roger Kennerson is a British figure skater who competed in ice dance.

With partner Yvonne Suddick, he won two bronze medals (in 1964 and 1965) and one silver medal (in 1966) at the European Figure Skating Championships.

== Competitive highlights ==
With Yvonne Suddick

Event	1964	1965	1966
World Championships	4th	6th	4th
European Championships	3rd	3rd	2nd
British Championships		2nd	2nd
