= Ludmila Belousova =

Soviet-Russian figure skater (1935–2017)

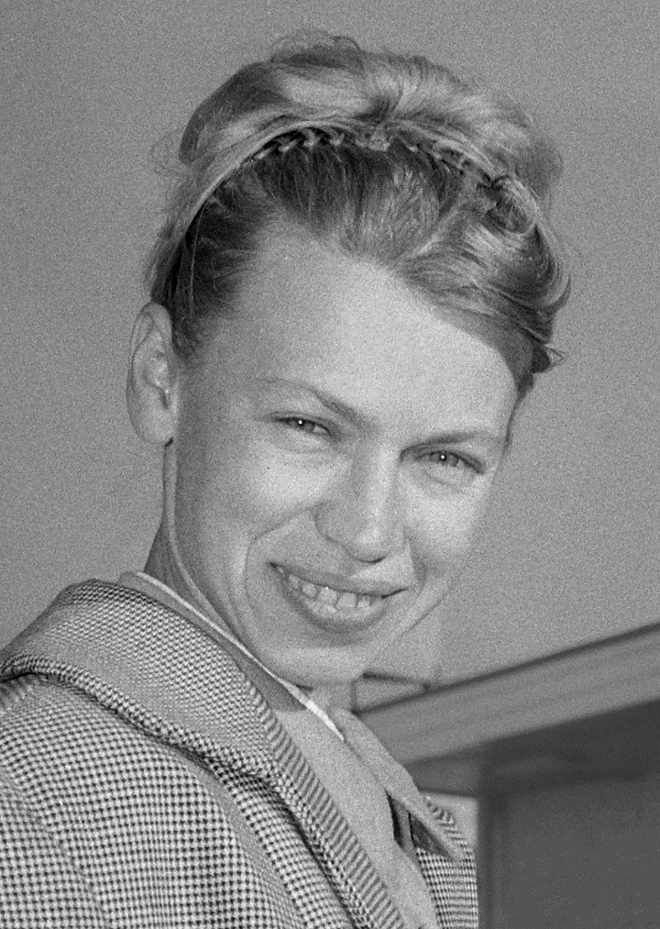
- Ludmila Belousova in 1965

Personal information
- Full name: Ludmila Yevgenyevna Belousova
- Born: 22 November 1935 Ulyanovsk, Russian SFSR, Soviet Union
- Died: 26 September 2017 (aged 81) Interlaken, Bern, Switzerland
- Height: 1.60 m (5 ft 3 in)

Figure skating career
- Country: Soviet Union
- Partner: Oleg Protopopov
- Retired: 1969
Medal record
Representing Soviet Union
Pairs' Figure skating
Olympic Games
Gold medal – first place	1968 Grenoble	Pairs
Gold medal – first place	1964 Innsbruck	Pairs
World Championships
Bronze medal – third place	1969 Colorado Springs	Pairs
Gold medal – first place	1968 Geneva	Pairs
Gold medal – first place	1967 Vienna	Pairs
Gold medal – first place	1966 Davos	Pairs
Gold medal – first place	1965 Colorado Springs	Pairs
Silver medal – second place	1964 Dormund	Pairs
Silver medal – second place	1963 Cortina d'Ampezzo	Pairs
Silver medal – second place	1962 Prague	Pairs
European Championships
Silver medal – second place	1969 Garmisch-Partenkirchen	Pairs
Gold medal – first place	1968 Västerås	Pairs
Gold medal – first place	1967 Ljubljana	Pairs
Gold medal – first place	1966 Bratislava	Pairs
Gold medal – first place	1965 Moscow	Pairs
Silver medal – second place	1964 Grenoble	Pairs
Silver medal – second place	1963 Budapest	Pairs
Silver medal – second place	1962 Geneva	Pairs

Ludmila Yevgenyevna Belousova (Russian: Людмила Евгеньевна Белоусова; 22 November 1935 – 26 September 2017) was a Soviet and Russian pair skater who represented the Soviet Union. With her partner and husband Oleg Protopopov, she was a two-time Olympic champion (1964, 1968) and four-time World champion (1965–1968). In 1979, the pair defected to Switzerland and became Swiss citizens in 1995. They continued to skate at ice shows and exhibitions through their seventies.

== Career ==
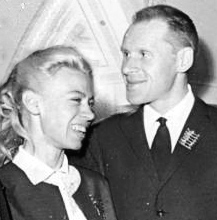
Belousova and Protopopov in 1966

Belousova started skating relatively late, at age 16. after having seen the ice revue movie "Springtime on ice" with Olympic runner-up and European Champion Eva Pawlik of Austria. She trained in Moscow where she met Oleg Protopopov in the spring of 1954. She moved to Leningrad in 1955 and began training with Protopopov in 1956 following his navy discharge. The pair trained at the VSS Lokomotiv sports club and competed internationally for the USSR. They were coached initially by Igor Moskvin and then by Pyotr Orlov, but parted ways with Orlov after a number of disagreements. The pair then trained without a coach at a rink in Voskresensk, Moscow Oblast. In 1961, they decided to work with Stanislav Zhuk to raise their technical level.

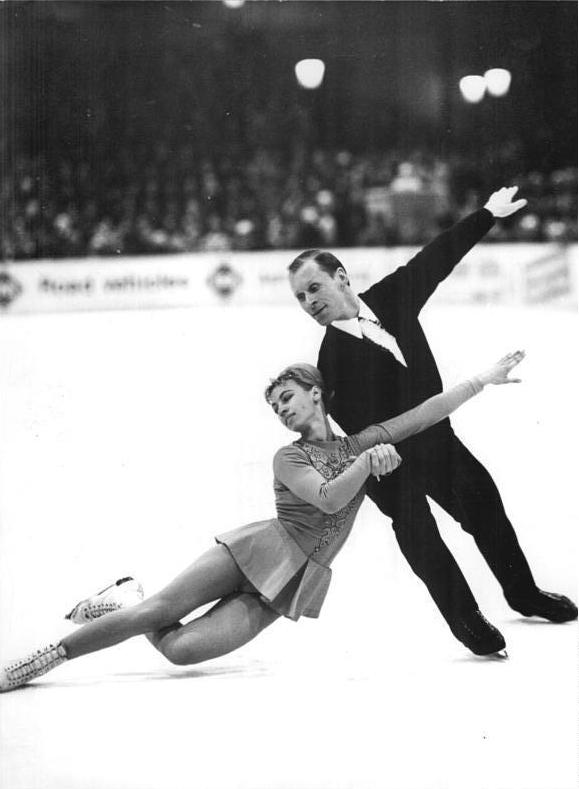
Belousova and Protopopov in 1968

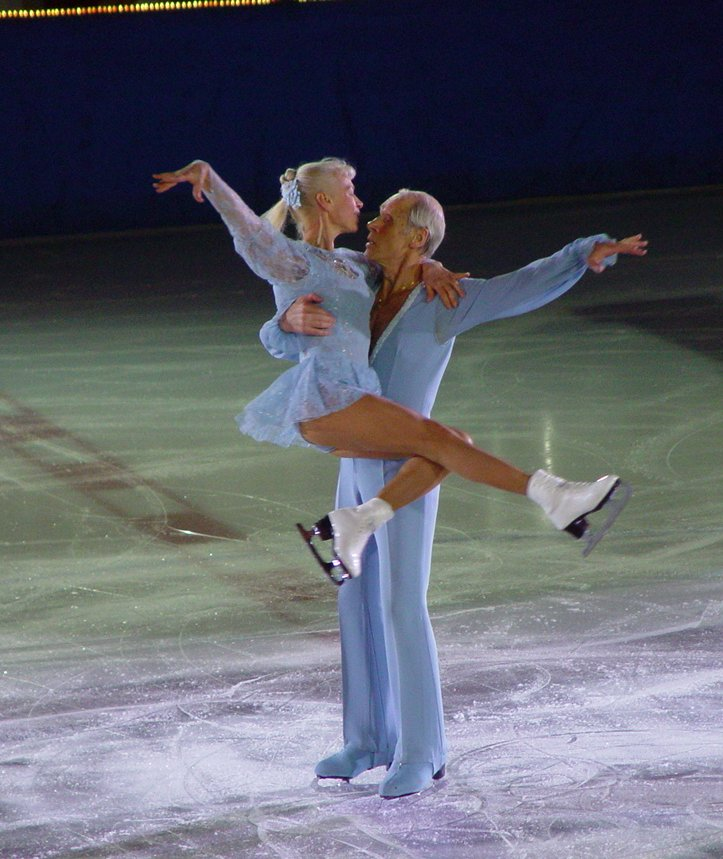
Belousova and Protopopov in 2007

In 1958, Belousova and Protopopov debuted at the European Championships, coming in 10th place, and at the World Championships, finishing in 13th place. They competed at their first Olympics two years later, placing ninth. In 1962, they made the World Championship podium for the first time, earning the silver medal. They were the first pair from the Soviet Union or Russia to win a world medal after the pair skating discipline was introduced at the 1908 World Championships (in which only three pairs competed). Later in 1962, they won silver at the European Championships, becoming the second Soviet pair to medal after Nina Zhuk and Stanislav Zhuk (who won silver in 1958, 1959, and 1960).

The pair's first major international gold medal came at the 1964 Winter Olympics. It was the first Olympic pairs gold for the Soviet Union. Belousova and Protopopov began the forty-year Soviet/Russian gold medal streak in pair skating, the longest in Olympic sports history, from 1964 to 2006. They won their first World and European gold medals in 1965, becoming the first Soviet/Russian pair to win those titles.

They became Olympic champions for the second time at the 1968 Winter Olympics. At 32 and 35 years old, respectively, they were among the oldest champions in figure skating. The following season, they won the silver medal at the European Championships and bronze at the World Championships as Irina Rodnina began her reign with her first partner, Alexei Ulanov. Those were the pair's final appearances at major international competitions but they continued competing in the Soviet Union until 1972.

In total, Belousova and Protopopov won two Olympic titles and medalled eight times at both the World and European Championships, including four consecutive World and European gold medals. After retiring from competition, they continued to skate together in shows for many years. In September 2015, they renewed their long-standing tradition of skating in a charitable exhibition in Boston, Massachusetts, at an event called "Evening with Champions". They were inducted into the World Figure Skating Hall of Fame in 1978.

Belousova and Protopopov contributed to the development of pair skating, including the creation of three death spirals: the backward inside (BiDs), the forward inside (FiDs), and the forward outside (FoDs), which they respectively dubbed the "Cosmic spiral", "Life spiral", and "Love spiral". Dick Button stated: "The Protopopovs are great skaters not only because they were the finest of Olympic champions, but also because their creative impact was extraordinary." Figure skating writer and historian Ellyn Kestnbaum stated that they "raised by several degrees the level of translating classical dance to the ice". As Kestnbaum stated, "Their performances set a benchmark for romantic heterosexuality on the ice and for classical line and expressiveness that influenced not only pair skating but also singles and [ice] dance".

== Personal life ==
Belousova studied engineering at university. She married Protopopov in December 1957. Although she kept her maiden name after their marriage, the pair were commonly referred to as "The Protopopovs". Eager to keep skating, the couple decided not to have children.

On 24 September 1979, Belousova and Protopopov defected to Switzerland while on tour and applied for political asylum. They settled in Grindelwald and received Swiss citizenship in 1995. Switzerland remained their winter home while their summer home and training center was Lake Placid, New York. On 25 February 2003, they visited Russia after a 23-year asylum, on the invitation of Viacheslav Fetisov. They had their last exhibition dance in 2016, when Belousova was 80 years old.

Belousova died on 29 September 2017, at the age of 81. Oleg Protopopov died on 31 October 2023, at the age of 91. They were buried in Saint Petersburg on 11 September 2024.

== Competitive highlights ==
Event	1954–55	1955–56	1956–57	1957–58	1958–59	1959–60	1960–61	1961–62	1962–63	1963–64
Winter Olympic Games						9th				1st
World Championships				13th		8th		2nd	2nd	2nd
European Championships				10th	7th	4th		2nd	2nd	2nd
Soviet Championships	3rd	4th	2nd	2nd	2nd		2nd	1st	1st	1st

Event	1964–65	1965–66	1966–67	1967–68	1968–69	1969–70	1970–71	1971–72	1972–73
Winter Olympic Games				1st					
World Championships	1st	1st	1st	1st	3rd				
European Championships	1st	1st	1st	1st	2nd				
Soviet Championships		1st	1st	1st	2nd	4th	6th	3rd	
Prize of Moscow News							3rd	1st	2nd

Awards and achievements
Preceded by (Australia) George Moore	BBC Overseas Sports Personality of the Year (with Oleg Protopopov); 1968	Succeeded by (Australia) Rod Laver
