= McGilligan =

McGilligan is an Irish surname. It derives from Mac Giollagáin. Notable people with the surname include:

- Brian McGilligan (born 1963), Irish hurler and Gaelic footballer
- Janak Palta McGilligan, Indian social worker
- Patrick McGilligan (Fine Gael politician) (1889–1979), Irish lawyer and politician
- Patrick McGilligan (biographer), American writer
- Patrick McGilligan (Irish nationalist politician) (1847–1917), Irish nationalist politician
