= Jan Šrámek (figure skater) =

Czech former pair skater (born 1945)

Personal information
- Born: 4 September 1945 (age 80) Ostrava, Czechoslovakia
- Height: 1.71 m (5 ft 7 1/2 in)

Figure skating career
- Country: Czechoslovakia
- Partner: Bohunka Šrámková
- Retired: 1968

Jan Šrámek (born 4 September 1945) is a Czech former pair skater who represented Czechoslovakia. With his sister, Bohunka Šrámková, he is the 1968 Winter Universiade champion and 1967 Czechoslovak national champion. The pair placed tenth at the 1968 Winter Olympics in Grenoble, France. They also finished in the top ten at three ISU Championships – 1967 European Championships in Ljubljana, Yugoslavia; 1967 World Championships in Vienna, Austria; and 1968 World Championships in Geneva, Switzerland.

== Competitive highlights ==
Pairs with Šrámková

International
| Event | 1965–66 | 1966–67 | 1967–68 |
|---|---|---|---|
| Winter Olympics | | | 10th |
| World Championships | | 10th | 7th |
| European Championships | 16th | 9th | 11th |
| Prague Skate | 6th | 7th | |
| Winter Universiade | | | 1st |
National
| Czechoslovak Championships | 2nd | 1st | 2nd |
