= Bohunka Šrámková =

Czech former professional figure skater (born 1946)

Personal information
- Other names: Muki Bolton
- Born: 8 October 1946 (age 80) Ostrava, Czechoslovakia
- Height: 1.65 m (5 ft 5 in)

Figure skating career
- Country: Czechoslovakia
- Partner: Jan Šrámek
- Retired: 1968

Bohunka Šrámková, also known as Muki Bolton, (born 8 October 1946) is a Czech former pair skater who represented Czechoslovakia. With her brother, Jan Šrámek, she is the 1968 Winter Universiade champion and 1967 Czechoslovak national champion. The pair placed tenth at the 1968 Winter Olympics in Grenoble, France. They also finished in the top ten at three ISU Championships – 1967 European Championships in Ljubljana, Yugoslavia; 1967 World Championships in Vienna, Austria; and 1968 World Championships in Geneva, Switzerland.

Earlier in her career, Šrámková competed in ladies' singles, winning two national bronze medals. She was an attaché for the Czech delegation at the 2002 Winter Olympics in Salt Lake City.

== Competitive highlights ==
=== Pairs with Šrámek ===
International
| Event | 1965–66 | 1966–67 | 1967–68 |
|---|---|---|---|
| Winter Olympics | | | 10th |
| World Championships | | 10th | 7th |
| European Championships | 16th | 9th | 11th |
| Prague Skate | 6th | 7th | |
| Winter Universiade | | | 1st |
National
| Czechoslovak Championships | 2nd | 1st | 2nd |

=== Ladies' singles ===
National
| Event | 1963–64 | 1964–65 |
|---|---|---|
| Czechoslovak Championships | 3rd | 3rd |
