= Inge Strell =

Austrian figure skater

Personal information
- Nationality: Austrian
- Born: 17 December 1947 (age 77); Vienna, Austria

Sport
- Sport: Figure skating

Inge Strell (born 17 December 1947) is an Austrian figure skater. She competed in the pairs event at the 1964 Winter Olympics.
