= Monika Feldmann =

German figure skater

Personal information
- Born: 5 May 1951 (age 75) Frankfurt, West Germany

Figure skating career
- Country: West Germany
- Skating club: Frankfurter Roll- und Eissportclub
- Retired: 1968

Monika Feldmann (born 5 May 1951) is a German former figure skater who represented West Germany. She is a two-time national champion (1967–68) and placed 10th at the 1968 Winter Olympics in Grenoble, France. She also competed at four ISU Championships; her best result, 6th, came at the 1967 Europeans in Ljubljana, Yugoslavia.

== Competitive highlights ==
International
Event	1966	1967	1968
Winter Olympics			10th
World Championships		11th	11th
European Championships		6th	8th
National
West German Championships	3rd	1st	1st
