= Peggy Fleming =

American figure skater

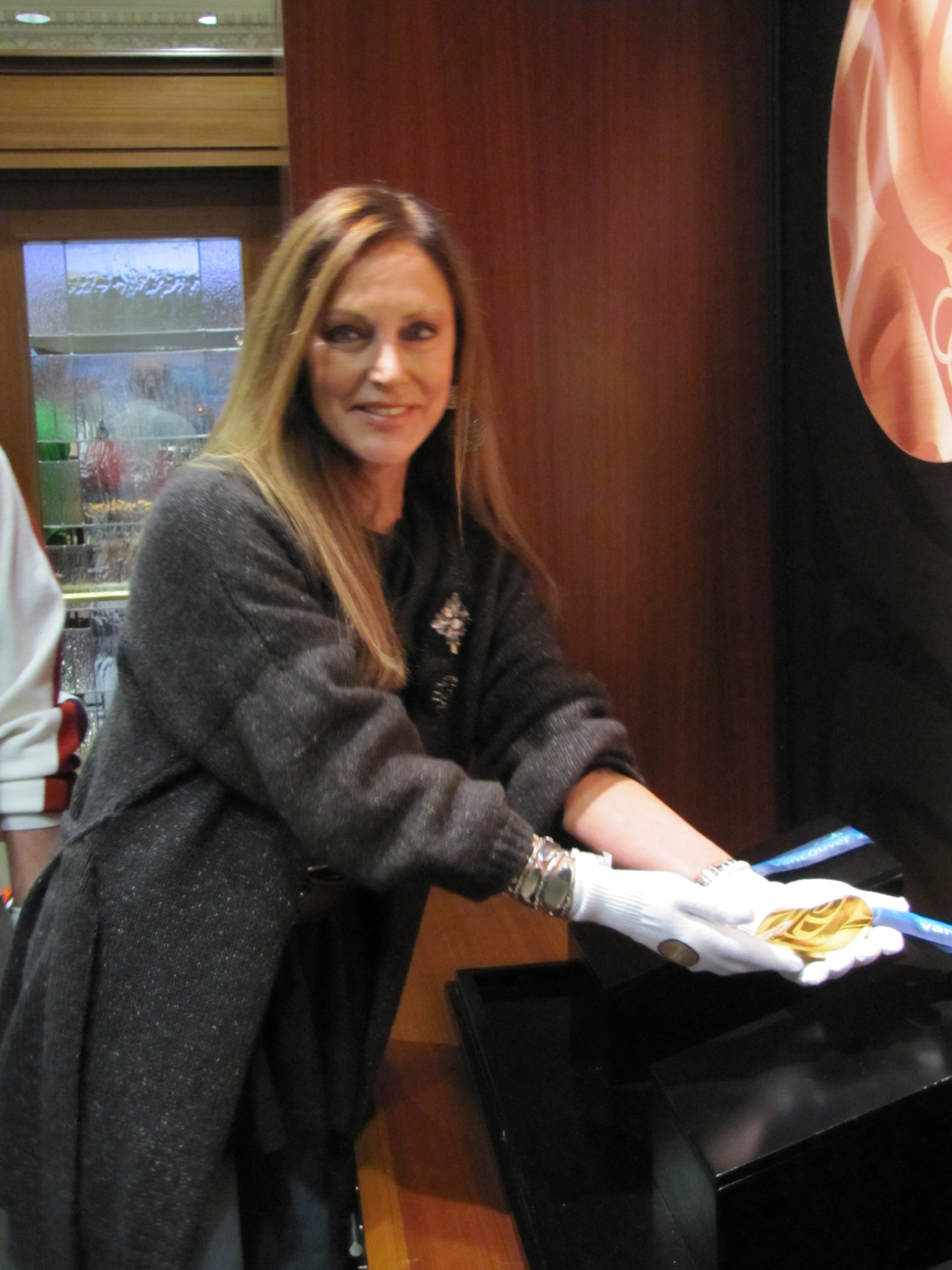
- Fleming at a joint Canada–USA event during the 2010 Winter Olympics

Personal information
- Born: July 27, 1948 (age 78) San Jose, California, U.S.
- Height: 5 ft 4 in (163 cm)

Figure skating career
- Country: United States
- Skating club: Arctic Blades FSC, Lake Arrowhead; Broadmoor Skating Club, Colorado Springs
- Retired: 1968
Medal record
Figure skating: Ladies' singles
Representing the United States
Olympic Games
Gold medal – first place	1968 Grenoble	Ladies' singles
World Championships
Gold medal – first place	1968 Geneva	Ladies' singles
Gold medal – first place	1967 Vienna	Ladies' singles
Gold medal – first place	1966 Davos	Ladies' singles
Bronze medal – third place	1965 Colorado Springs	Ladies' singles
North American Championships
Gold medal – first place	1967 Montreal	Ladies' singles
Silver medal – second place	1965 Rochester	Ladies' singles

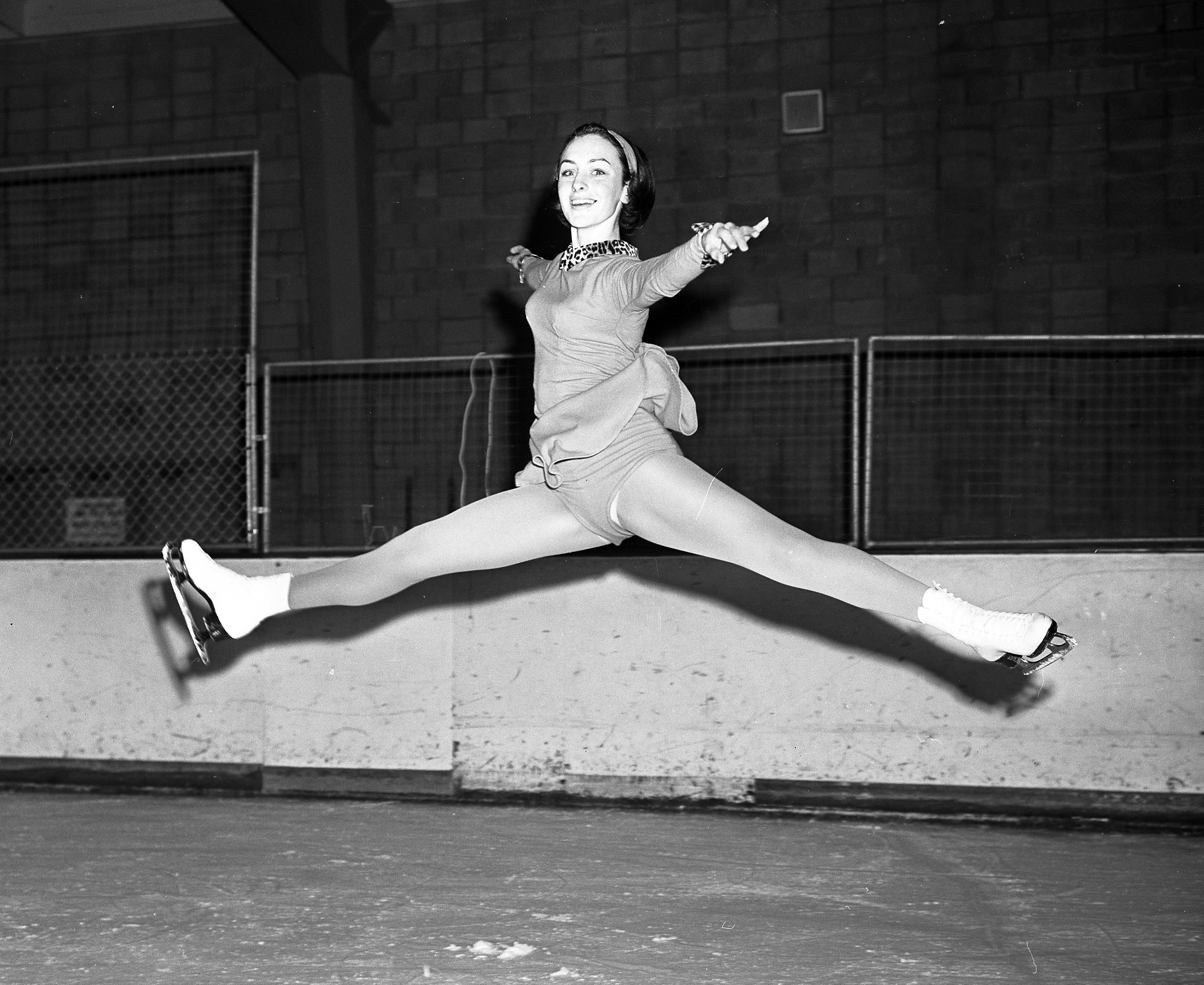
Peggy Fleming, 1965

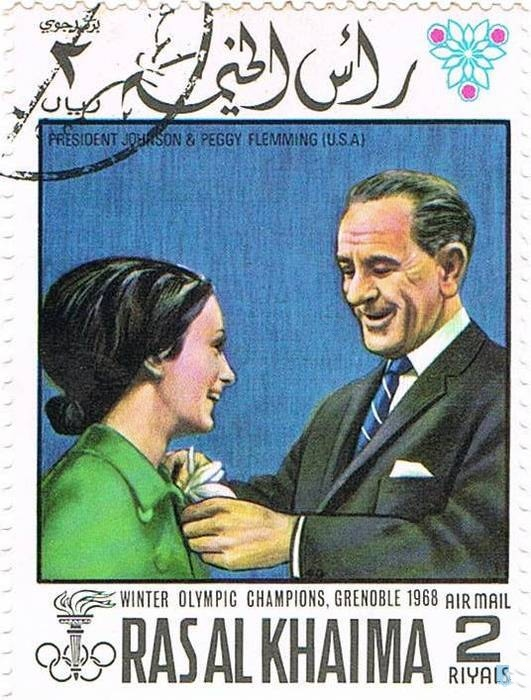
Peggy Fleming and Lyndon B. Johnson (stamp / UAE), 1968

Peggy Gale Fleming (born July 27, 1948) is a former American figure skater. She is the 1968 Winter Olympic Champion in the ladies' singles, being the only American gold medalist at these Games, and a three-time World Champion (1966–1968) in the same event. Fleming has been a television commentator in figure skating for over 20 years, including at several Winter Olympic Games.

== Career ==
Fleming was born and grew up in San Jose, California, the daughter of Doris Elizabeth (née Deal) and Albert Eugene Fleming, a newspaper journalist and former U.S. Marine. She began skating at age nine when her father took Peggy and her three sisters skating. In 1961, when Peggy was twelve years old, her coach William Kipp was killed in the crash of Sabena Flight 548 along with the rest of the United States figure skating team while en route to the 1961 World Figure Skating Championships. Fleming was subsequently coached by Carlo Fassi. Her unusual style led her to unprecedented success and five U.S. titles, three World titles and the gold medal at the 1968 Olympics in Grenoble, France. Philosopher Spencer Wertz called Fleming's Olympic free skating program "a watershed in the development of an artistic component of competitive skating."

Fleming's mother selected a color for her Grenoble skating costume, chartreuse, named after the liqueur of that color produced by neighboring Carthusians in their founding monastery, which also gives the name "chartreuse" to the region, thereby perhaps inspiring local French audience support for Peggy's virtually flawless performance. Her award in Grenoble was singularly important for the American athletes and the nation as a whole, for this was the only gold medal that the U.S. Olympic team won in the 1968 Winter Olympics. It signaled a return to American dominance in the sport of women's figure skating following the unprecedented tragedy of the 1961 Sabena plane crash.

Figure skating writer and historian Ellyn Kestnbaum states that although Fleming was from a working-class background, she presented the image of "well-groomed, well-disciplined...upper-class femininity." Fleming's costumes were made by her mother; and as Kestnbaum puts it, "reflected the simple elegance of classic lines." Fleming also drew upon ballet conventions, displaying "graceful classical positions", as well as her use of classical music, and, encouraged by compulsory figures, an upright and a relaxed upper-body carriage. Kestnbaum recognizes, however, that Fleming's fame advanced women's visibility in the male-dominated sports world, which "paved some steps along the way to women's visibility in widening spheres of public life."

After becoming an Olympic champion, Fleming turned professional, performed on TV shows including five NBC specials of her own and toured with many skating shows, like Ice Capades. Fleming had also filmed a TV show in the USSR and skated to Butterfly Lovers' Violin Concerto in China. Since 1981, she has been a skating commentator for ABC Sports. In 1993, the Associated Press released results of a national sports study that ranked Fleming as the third most popular athlete in America, behind fellow Olympians Mary Lou Retton and Dorothy Hamill.

== Personal life ==
On June 13, 1970, Fleming married her teenage sweetheart Greg Jenkins, a dermatologist and a former amateur figure skater. The couple have two sons, Andy (born in 1977) and Todd (born in 1988) and three grandchildren. They currently reside in Denver, Colorado.

Peggy Fleming was diagnosed with breast cancer in 1998. The cancer was detected in its early stages and surgery was successful. She became a breast cancer activist who recommends not procrastinating and advocates for early detection.

Fleming and her husband owned and operated Fleming Jenkins Vineyards & Winery in California. The winery produced close to 2,000 cases of wine a year with such names as "Choreography", a Bordeaux-style blend from Napa Valley, and "Victories Rose" from the San Francisco Bay Syrah. Profits from the "Victories Rosé" went toward charities that supported research towards breast cancer. They had a tasting room in Los Gatos, California. The winery closed in 2011.

In 1988, a Peggy Fleming all-porcelain doll was made by Franklin Mint Heirloom Porcelain Dolls.

In 2007, Fleming appeared in the movie Blades of Glory as a judge.

In 2010, Art of the Olympians produced a 30-minute documentary about Fleming. She is also an artist with works on display with the Art of the Olympians.

Along with former Olympian Vonetta Flowers, Fleming was injured and briefly hospitalized after a traffic incident while riding in U.S. Vice President Joe Biden's motorcade at the 2010 Winter Olympics in Vancouver.

== Performance ==
Event	1962	1963	1964	1965	1966	1967	1968
Winter Olympics			6th				1st
World Championships			7th	3rd	1st	1st	1st
North American Championships				2nd		1st	
U.S. Championships	2nd N.	3rd J.	1st	1st	1st	1st	1st

== Awards and honors ==
- ABC's Wide World of Sports Athlete of the Year, 1967.
- In 2003, Fleming was honored with the "Lombardi Award of Excellence" from the Vince Lombardi Cancer Foundation. The award was created to honor Coach Lombardi's legacy, and is awarded annually to an individual who exemplifies the spirit of the Coach.

== See also ==
- List of celebrities who own wineries and vineyards
