= Gerlinde Schönbauer =

Austrian figure skater

Personal information
- Full name: Gerlinde Schönbauer
- Born: 7 March 1948 (age 78)

Figure skating career
- Country: Austria
- Skating club: Wiener Eislauf-Verein

Gerlinde Schönbauer (born 7 March 1948) is an Austrian pair skater. With partner Wilhelm Bietak, she represented Austria at the 1964 Winter Olympics, where they placed 12th. Their partnership ended in 1966.

== Competitive highlights ==
International
Event	1963	1964	1965	1966
Winter Olympics		12th		
World Championships		11th	10th	
European Championships	14th	9th	9th	11th
National
Austrian Championships	1st	1st	1st	1st
