= Tsuguhiko Kozuka =

Japanese figure skater

Japanese name
- Kanji: 小塚 嗣彦
- Kana: こづか つぐひこ
Transcriptions
- Romanization: Kozuka Tsuguhiko

Tsuguhiko Kozuka (小塚 嗣彦, Kozuka Tsuguhiko; born November 6, 1946 in Aichi, Japan) is a Japanese figure skater who is now a coach. He won the three-time Japan Figure Skating Championships. He placed 18th in the 1968 Winter Olympic Games. He is the father of Takahiko Kozuka.

He is now an International Judge for Japan.

== Results ==
| Event | 1965 | 1966 | 1967 | 1968 | 1969 | 1970 | 1971 | 1972 |
|---|---|---|---|---|---|---|---|---|
| Winter Olympics | | | | 18th | | | | |
| World Championships | | 19th | 17th | 14th | 13th | | | |
| Japanese Championships | 2nd | 2nd | 1st | 1st | 1st | | 2nd | 3rd |

== See also ==
- Figure skating at the 1968 Winter Olympics
