= William Lewis (figure skater) =

Canadian figure skater

William Lewis is a former Canadian figure skater. He was the 1949 and 1952 silver and 1950-51 national bronze medalist.

== Results ==
Competition	1947	1948	1949	1950	1951	1952
World Championships					9th	
Canadian Championships	2nd J	1st J	2nd	3rd	3rd	2nd
