= Marianne Streifler =

Personal information
- Born: 5 February 1951 (age 75) Höchst, Frankfurt am Main
- Height: 1.62 m (5 ft 4 in)

Figure skating career
- Country: West Germany
- Partner: Herbert Wiesinger
- Skating club: FREC, Frankfurt am Main
- Retired: c. 1969

Marianne Streifler (born 5 February 1951) is a former pair skater who represented West Germany. With Herbert Wiesinger, she is the 1967 Prague Skate silver medalist and a three-time West German national medalist. The pair placed 11th at the 1968 Winter Olympics in Grenoble and 6th at the 1969 European Championships in Garmisch-Partenkirchen.

During her competitive career, Streifler was a member of FREC in Frankfurt am Main. After retiring from competition, she spent four years skating for Holiday on Ice. She then coached in Lauterbach, Hesse before relocating in 2008 to Füssen, Bavaria.

== Competitive highlights ==
With Wiesinger

International
Event	64–65	65–66	66–67	67–68	68–69
Winter Olympics				11th	
World Championships			11th	12th	
European Championships			11th	9th	6th
Prague Skate		4th		2nd	
National
West German Champ.	6th	4th	2nd	3rd	2nd
