= Sylvaine Duban =

French figure skater

Sylvaine Duban (born 9 June 1949 in Saint-Étienne, France) is a former French figure skater who competed in ladies singles. She won the gold medal at the French Figure Skating Championships in 1967 and 1968. She finished 18th at the 1967 World Figure Skating Championships and 27th at the 1968 Winter Olympics.

== Results ==
Event	1964	1965	1966	1967	1968
Winter Olympic Games					27th
World Championships				18th	
European Championships	19th			12th	19th
French Championships		2nd		1st	1st
