= Herbert Wiesinger =

German former pair skater

Herbert Wiesinger (born 26 July 1948, in Jugenheim an der Bergstrasse) is a German former pair skater who competed for West Germany.

He partnered with Marianne Streifler until 1969. They were two-time German silver medalists and placed 11th at the 1968 Winter Olympics. The pair represented the Frankfurter REC club.

He teamed up with Almut Lehmann in 1970 and competed with her until retirement. They were three-time German national champions and won the bronze medal at the 1973 European Figure Skating Championships. They placed 5th at the 1972 Winter Olympics. They represented the club SC Rießersee.

== Competitive highlights ==
=== With Almut Lehmann ===
International
Event	1969–70	1970–71	1971–72	1972–73
Winter Olympics			5th	
World Championships	6th	5th	5th	4th
European Champ.	5th	5th	4th	3rd
Nebelhorn Trophy		1st		
Prize of Moscow News		5th		
National
West German Champ.	2nd	1st	1st	1st

=== With Marianne Streifler ===
International
Event	64–65	65–66	66–67	67–68	68–69
Winter Olympics				11th	
World Championships			11th	12th	
European Championships			11th	9th	6th
Prague Skate		4th		2nd	
National
West German Champ.	6th	4th	2nd	3rd	2nd
