= Károly Csanádi =

Hungarian ice dancer

Figure skating career
- Country: Hungary
- Partner: Edit Mató
- Retired: c. 1969

Károly Csanádi is a Hungarian former ice dancer. With Edit Mató, he is the 1966 Winter Universiade champion and a four-time Hungarian national champion. The duo competed at three World Championships and five European Championships. They placed within the European top ten in 1966 (Bratislava, Czechoslovakia), 1967 (Ljubljana, Yugoslavia), and 1968 (Västerås, Sweden).

== Competitive highlights ==
With Mató

International
| Event | 64–65 | 65–66 | 66–67 | 67–68 | 68–69 |
|---|---|---|---|---|---|
| World Championships | | 15th | 14th | 11th | |
| European Championships | 12th | 8th | 9th | 8th | 12th |
| Prague Skate | 8th | | 9th | | |
| Winter Universiade | | 1st | | | |
National
| Hungarian Championships | | 1st | 1st | 1st | 1st |
