= Emmerich Danzer =

Austrian figure skater

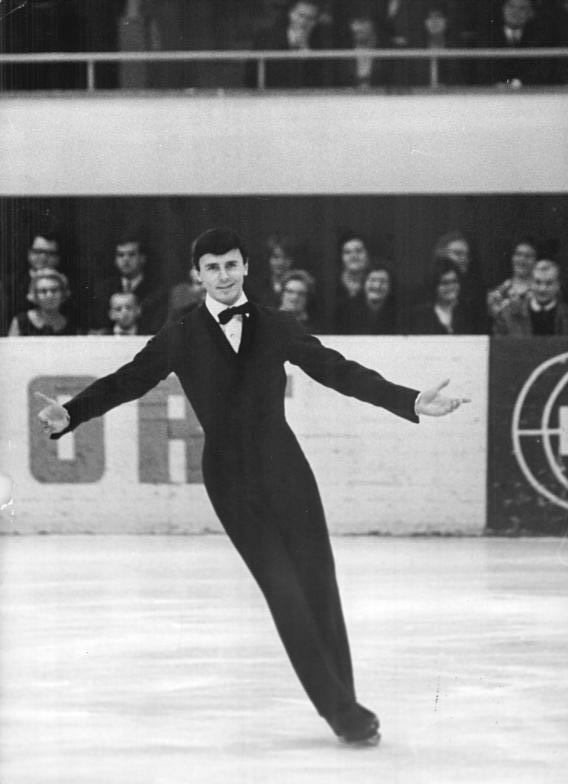
- Emmerich Danzer at an exhibition in Berlin in 1967

Personal information
- Born: 15 March 1944 (age 82) Vienna, Nazi Germany

Figure skating career
- Country: Austria
- Skating club: WEV, Wien
Medal record
Representing Austria
Figure skating: Men's singles
World Championships
Gold medal – first place	1968 Geneva	Men's singles
Gold medal – first place	1967 Vienna	Men's singles
Gold medal – first place	1966 Davos	Men's singles
European Championships
Gold medal – first place	1968 Västerås	Men's singles
Gold medal – first place	1967 Ljubljana	Men's singles
Gold medal – first place	1966 Bratislava	Men's singles
Gold medal – first place	1965 Moscow	Men's singles
Bronze medal – third place	1963 Budapest	Men's singles

Emmerich Danzer (born 15 March 1944) is an Austrian former figure skater. He is a three-time (1966–68) World champion, a four-time (1965–68) European champion, and a four-time (1965–68) Austrian national champion.

== Personal life ==
Emmerich Danzer was born on 15 March 1944 in Vienna, Austria (then part of Nazi Germany). He attended a Catholic school in Vienna.

== Career ==
=== Competitive ===
Emmerich Danzer began to skate at the age of five. Herta Wächter became his coach in 1953. His skating club was WEV in Vienna.

Danzer stood on his first ISU Championship podium at the 1963 Europeans in Budapest. He finished fourth the following year, in Grenoble, before winning gold ahead of France's Alain Calmat at the 1965 Europeans in Moscow. He placed fifth at the 1965 World Championships in Colorado Springs, Colorado.

Danzer won the European championships four times, from 1965—1968, and the Worlds title three times, from 1966—1968. He was the gold medal favorite at the 1968 Winter Olympics, held in February in Grenoble, but placed fourth in the compulsory figures after almost coming to a stop. His first place in the free skate was not enough to lift him onto the podium as his teammate Wolfgang Schwarz, whom Danzer had defeated in 12 national and international competitions, took the gold.

Danzer was voted Austrian athlete of the year in 1966 and 1967.

=== Post-competition work ===
Danzer turned professional in 1968 and performed with the Wiener Eisrevue (Vienna Ice Revue) and Holiday on Ice until 1975. He also recorded a song, Sag es mir, which became a hit in Austria. From 1975 to 1989, he worked as a coach at Lake Placid in the United States.

Danzer began working for an insurance company in Vienna in 1989; he is in charge of sport insurance activities and sport sponsoring. From 1995 to 1997, he served as the president of the Austrian figure skating organization (Österreichischer Eiskunstlaufverband). In 2000, he became the president of the figure skating club "Wiener Eislaufverein".

Danzer is also a commentator for the Austrian television station ORF, often collaborating with Ingrid Wendl on figure skating events.

== Competitive highlights ==
International
Event	1961	1962	1963	1964	1965	1966	1967	1968
Winter Olympics				5th				4th
World Champ.		7th	9th	5th	5th	1st	1st	1st
European Champ.	5th	5th	3rd	4th	1st	1st	1st	1st
National
Austrian Champ.	2nd	2nd	2nd	2nd	1st	1st	1st	1st
