= Michael Williams (figure skater) =

British ice skater (born 1947)

Michael Thorpe Williams (born 23 March 1947, in Manchester) was a British ice skater who competed in men's singles. He won the gold medal at the British Figure Skating Championships in 1967 and 1968 and finished 15th at the 1968 Winter Olympics.
