= Monique Mathys =

Swiss figure skater

Personal information
- Nationality: Swiss
- Born: 24 October 1945 (age 79)

Sport
- Sport: Figure skating

Monique Mathys (born 24 October 1945) is a Swiss figure skater. She competed in the pairs event at the 1964 Winter Olympics.
