= Betty McKilligan =

Canadian pair skater

Betty McKilligan (born November 16, 1949) is a Canadian former pair skater. With partner John McKilligan, she won the gold medal at the Canadian Figure Skating Championships in 1967 and 1968 and competed in the 1968 Winter Olympics.

== Results ==
(pairs with John McKilligan)

Event	1964	1965	1966	1968	1969
Winter Olympic Games					17th
World Championships				18th	13th
Canadian Championships	3rd J	1st J	3rd	1st	1st
