= Yves Ällig =

Swiss figure skater

Personal information
- Nationality: Swiss
- Born: 11 September 1944 (age 80)

Sport
- Sport: Figure skating

Yves Ällig (born 11 September 1944) is a Swiss figure skater. He competed in the pairs event at the 1964 Winter Olympics.
