= Janina Poremska =

Personal information
- Full name: Janina Danuta Poremska
- Other names: Janina Danuta Nowakowska
- Born: 13 May 1948 (age 78) Siemianowice Śląskie, Poland
- Height: 1.56 m (5 ft 1 1/2 in)

Figure skating career
- Country: Poland
- Skating club: KKŁ Katowice (1958–1963); MKS Pałac Młodzieży Katowice (1964–1968); Naprzód Janów (1969–1970)
- Retired: 1970

Janina Danuta Poremska (née Nowakowska; born 13 May 1948) is a former Polish pair skater. With skating partner Piotr Szczypa, she is a six-time Polish national champion, and competed at the 1968 Winter Olympics.

== Results ==
(with Szczypa)

International
Event	64–65	65–66	66–67	67–68	68–69	69–70
Winter Olympics				14th		
World Champ.			14th	16th		10th
European Champ.		18th	8th	15th	8th	9th
Prague Skate			9th	3rd		
National
Polish Champ.	1st	1st	1st	1st	1st	1st
