= Walter Häfner =

German pair skater

Walter Häfner (born 3 May 1944) is a former West German pair skater. With partner Gudrun Hauss, he finished fourth at both the 1967 European Figure Skating Championships and World Figure Skating Championships. They finished eighth at the 1968 Winter Olympics and won the gold medal at the German Figure Skating Championships in 1969.

== Results ==
(with Hauss)

International
Event	64–65	65–66	66–67	67–68	68–69
Winter Olympics				8th	
World Championships		6th	4th	6th	7th
European Champ.	11th	6th	4th	6th	5th
Prague Skate			2nd		
National
West German Champ.		2nd		2nd	1st
