= 1997 in sports =

1997 in sports describes the year's events in world sport.

== Alpine skiing ==
- Alpine Skiing World Cup
  - Men's overall season champion: Luc Alphand, France
  - Women's overall season champion: Pernilla Wiberg, Sweden

== American football ==
- Super Bowl XXXI – the Green Bay Packers (NFC) won 35–21 over the New England Patriots (AFC)
  - Location: Superdome
  - Attendance: 72,301
  - MVP: Desmond Howard, KR (Green Bay)
- Sugar Bowl (1996 season):
  - The Florida Gators won 52–20 over the Florida State Seminoles to win the national championship
- October 18 – Liz Heaston becomes the first woman to both play and score in a college football game

== Artistic gymnastics ==
- World Artistic Gymnastics Championships –
  - Women's all–around champion: Svetlana Khorkina, Russian
  - Women's team competition champion: Romania
  - Women's vault champion: Simona Amânar, Romania
  - Women's uneven bars champion: Svetlana Khorkina, Russian
  - Women's balance beam champion: Gina Gogean, Romania
  - Women's floor exercise champion: Gina Gogean, Romania
  - Men's all-around champion: Ivan Ivankov, Belarus
  - Men's team competition champion: China
  - Men's vault champion: Sergei Fedorchenko, Kazakhstan
  - Men's still rings champion: Yuri Chechi, Italy
  - Men's floor exercise champion: Alexei Nemov, Russian
  - Men's parallel bars champion: Zhang Jinjing, China
  - Men's pommel horse champion: Valery Belenky, Germany
  - Men's horizontal bar champion: Jani Tanskanen, Finland

== Association football ==
- Champions League – Borussia Dortmund beat Juventus FC 3–1
- UEFA Cup – FC Schalke 04 beat F.C. Internazionale Milano
- Copa Libertadores – Cruzeiro Esporte Clube beat Sporting Cristal

== Athletics ==
- August – 1997 World Championships in Athletics held at the Olympic Stadium, Athens, Greece.

== Australian football ==
- Australian Football League
  - Port Adelaide join the league
    - Adelaide Crows win Grand Final for the first time – downing St. Kilda on the last day in September

== Baseball ==
- June 12 – Interleague play begins in baseball, ending a 126-year tradition of separating the major leagues until the World Series.
- World Series – Florida Marlins won 4 games to 3 over the Cleveland Indians. The Series MVP was Liván Hernández, Florida

== Basketball ==
- NCAA Men's Basketball Championship –
  - Arizona Wildcats win 84–79 in overtime over the Kentucky Wildcats. This is Arizona's first NCAA title in men's basketball.
- NBA Finals –
  - Chicago Bulls earn their second repeat of the decade as they beat the Utah Jazz 4 games to 2 (see Steve Kerr).
- WNBA Finals (inaugural WNBA season):
  - Houston Comets defeat the New York Liberty in one game playoff series.
- National Basketball League (Australia) Finals:
  - Melbourne Tigers defeated the South East Melbourne Magic 2–1 in the best–of–three final series.

== Boxing ==
- January 18 – Oscar De La Hoya maintained his World Boxing Council super lightweight title in with a 12–round unanimous decision over Miguel Ángel González in Las Vegas, Nevada.
- May 13 – death of Eduard Zakharov (22), Russian boxer
- June 28 – Mike Tyson bites off a piece of the ear of Evander Holyfield in the third round of their WBA Heavyweight title fight, getting disqualified by referee Mills Lane.
- July 9 – Mike Tyson's boxing license is suspended for at least a year and he is fined $3 million for biting Evander Holyfield's ear in a televised match.
- October 18 to October 26 – World Amateur Boxing Championships held in Budapest, Hungary

== Canadian football ==
- Grey Cup – Toronto Argonauts won 47–23 over the Saskatchewan Roughriders
- Vanier Cup – UBC Thunderbirds win 39–23 over the Ottawa Gee-Gees

== Cricket ==
- The Ashes – Australia win the six test series 3–2
- ICC Trophy – Bangladesh
- Women's Cricket World Cup – Australia beat New Zealand by five wickets
- County Championship (England and Wales) won by Glamorgan

== Cycling ==
- Giro d'Italia won by Ivan Gotti of Italy
- Tour de France – Jan Ullrich of Germany
- UCI Road World Championships – Men's road race – Laurent Brochard of France

== Dogsled racing ==
- Iditarod Trail Sled Dog Race Champion
  - Martin Buser won with lead dogs: Blondie & Fearless

== Field hockey ==
- Men's Champions Trophy: Germany
- Women's Champions Trophy: Australia

== Figure skating ==
- World Figure Skating Championships –
  - Men's champion: Elvis Stojko, Canada
  - Ladies' champion: Tara Lipinski, United States
  - Pairs' champions: Mandy Wötzel & Ingo Steuer, Germany
  - Ice dancing champions: Oksana Grishuk / Evgeny Platov, Russia

== Floorball ==
- Women's World Floorball Championships
  - Champion: Sweden
- European Cup
  - Men's champion: Fornudden IB
  - Women's champion: Högdalens AIS

== Gaelic Athletic Association ==
- Camogie
  - All-Ireland Camogie Champion: Cork
  - National Camogie League: Cork
- Gaelic football
  - All-Ireland Senior Football Championship – Kerry 0–13 died Mayo 1–7
  - National Football League – Kerry 3–7 died Cork 1–8
- Ladies' Gaelic football
  - All-Ireland Senior Football Champion: Monaghan
  - National Football League: Waterford
- Hurling
  - All-Ireland Senior Hurling Championship – Clare 0–20 died Tipperary 2–13
  - National Hurling League – Limerick 1–12 beat Galway 1–9

== Golf ==
Men's professional

- Masters Tournament – Tiger Woods
- U.S. Open – Ernie Els
- British Open – Justin Leonard
- PGA Championship – Davis Love III
- PGA Tour money leader – Tiger Woods – $2,066,833
- PGA Tour Player of the Year – Tiger Woods
- PGA Tour Rookie of the Year – Stewart Cink
- Senior PGA Tour money leader – Hale Irwin – $2,343,364
- Ryder Cup – Europe won 14½–13½ over the United States in team golf.
- Tiger Woods creates an uproar with his record 12-shot victory at the Masters, and becomes the first Masters winner of African-American descent. He set the record for the lowest to-par score of −18, and the lowest 72-hole score of 272. He also rises to the No. 1 ranking on June 15, in only his 42nd week as a professional – the fastest ascent to the No. 1 ranking.

Men's amateur

- British Amateur – Craig Watson
- U.S. Amateur – Matt Kuchar
- European Amateur – Didier de Voogt

Women's professional

- Nabisco Dinah Shore – Betsy King
- LPGA Championship – Christa Johnson
- U.S. Women's Open – Alison Nicholas
- Classique du Maurier – Colleen Walker
- LPGA Tour money leader – Annika Sörenstam – $1,236,789

== Handball ==
- World Men's Handball Championship – won by Russia
- World Women's Handball Championship – won by Denmark

== Harness racing ==
- North America Cup – Gothic Dream
- Western Dreamer won the United States Pacing Triple Crown races –
  1. Cane Pace – Western Dreamer
  2. Little Brown Jug – Western Dreamer
  3. Messenger Stakes – Western Dreamer
- United States Trotting Triple Crown races –
  1. Hambletonian – Malabar Man
  2. Yonkers Trot – Lord Stormont
  3. Kentucky Futurity – Take Chances
- Australian Inter Dominion Harness Racing Championship –
  - Pacers: Our Sir Vancelot
  - Trotters: Pride Of Petite

== Horse racing ==
- The Grand National Saturday meeting was abandoned after two coded bomb threats were received, causing evacuation of the course. The race was eventually run on the following Monday.

Steeplechases

- Cheltenham Gold Cup – Mr Mulligan
- Grand National – Lord Gyllene

Flat races

- Australia – Melbourne Cup won by Might And Power
- Canada – Queen's Plate won by Awesome Again
- Dubai – Dubai World Cup won by Singspiel
- France – Prix de l'Arc de Triomphe won by Peintre Célèbre
- Ireland – Irish Derby Stakes won by Desert King
- Japan – Japan Cup won by Pilsudski
- English Triple Crown races:
  1. 2,000 Guineas Stakes – Entrepreneur
  2. The Derby – Benny the Dip
  3. St. Leger Stakes – Silver Patriarch
- United States Triple Crown races:
  1. Kentucky Derby – Silver Charm
  2. Preakness Stakes – Silver Charm
  3. Belmont Stakes – Touch Gold
- Breeders' Cup World Thoroughbred Championships:
  1. Breeders' Cup Classic – Skip Away
  2. Breeders' Cup Distaff – Ajina
  3. Breeders' Cup Juvenile – Favorite Trick
  4. Breeders' Cup Juvenile Fillies – Countess Diana
  5. Breeders' Cup Mile – Spinning World
  6. Breeders' Cup Sprint – Elmhurst
  7. Breeders' Cup Turf – Chief Bearhart

== Ice hockey ==
- Art Ross Trophy as the NHL's leading scorer during the regular season: Mario Lemieux, Pittsburgh Penguins
- Hart Memorial Trophy for the NHL's Most Valuable Player: Dominik Hašek of the Buffalo Sabres
- Stanley Cup – Detroit Red Wings win 4 games to 0 over the Philadelphia Flyers
- World Hockey Championship
  - Men's champion: Canada defeated Sweden
  - Junior Men's champion: Finland defeated Russia
  - Women's champion: Canada defeated the United States

== Lacrosse ==
- The Rochester Knighthawks defeat the Buffalo Bandits 15–12 to win the Major Indoor Lacrosse League championship
  - The National Lacrosse League (NLL) is formed from the Major Indoor Lacrosse League (MILL), with the decision to move from league ownership of all teams to individual team ownership.
- Mann Cup for the Canadian box lacrosse championship: Victoria Shamrocks of the Western Lacrosse Association
- European Lacrosse Championships –
  - Men's champion: England defeats the Czech Republic
  - Women's champion: England defeats Wales

== Mixed martial arts ==
The following is a list of major noteworthy MMA events during 1997 in chronological order.

Date	Event	Alternate Name/s	Location	Attendance	PPV Buyrate	Notes
February 7	UFC 12: Judgement Day	—	Dothan, Alabama, United States	3,100	—	UFC rule change, split main tournament into heavyweight (200lbs+) and lightweight (Under 200lbs) divisions. Eight-man tournament ceases. Introduction of titles. Superfights cease.
May 30	UFC 13: Ultimate Force	—	Augusta, Georgia, United States	5,100	—	Closed fisted strikes to the head were banned for this event only.
July 27	UFC 14: Showdown	—	Birmingham, Alabama, United States	5,000	—	UFC rule change, requires fighters to use 4–6 oz gloves.
October 11	Pride 1	—	Tokyo, Japan	47,860	—	Pride FC's first event. The event featured one kickboxing bout between Branko Cikatić and Ralph White.
October 17	UFC 15: Collision Course	—	Bay St. Louis, Mississippi, United States	—	—	UFC rule change, redefined permissible striking areas.
December 21	UFC Japan: Ultimate Japan	UFC 15.5	Yokohama, Japan	5,000	—	This event featured the first appearance of longtime UFC announcer Mike Goldberg.

== Radiosport ==
- Eighth Amateur Radio Direction Finding World Championship held in Sankt Englmar, Germany.
- Second High Speed Telegraphy World Championship held in Sofia, Bulgaria.

== Rowing ==
- McGill University Rowing Club wins the inaugural McGill-Queen's Challenge Boat Race.

== Rugby league ==
- 1 March – Townsville, Australia: The Adelaide Rams play their inaugural game, a loss to the North Queensland Cowboys 24–16 at Dairy Farmers Stadium before a crowd of 17,738.
- 2 March – Newcastle, Australia: The Hunter Mariners club plays its inaugural game, a 20–16 loss to the Canterbury-Bankstown Bulldogs at Topper Stadium before a crowd of 6,579.
- 18 May – Auckland, New Zealand: In the 1997 Oceania Cup's final New Zealand XIII defeat New Zealand Māori 20 – 15 at Carlaw Park.
- 19 May – Brisbane, Australia: In the final of the only Super League Tri-series to be played, New South Wales defeat Queensland 23–22 at ANZ Stadium before a crowd of 35,570. It sets a new record as the longest game of rugby league ever played before being decided by a field goal during extra time.
- 11 June – Melbourne, Australia: The 1997 State of Origin series is wrapped up in Game II by New South Wales who defeat Queensland 15–14 at the Melbourne Cricket Ground before a crowd of 25,105.
- 20 September – Brisbane, Australia: The 1997 Super League (Australia) season's Grand Final is won by the Brisbane Broncos who defeated the Cronulla-Sutherland Sharks 26–8 at ANZ Stadium before a crowd of 58,912.
- 28 September – Sydney, Australia: The 1997 ARL season's grand final is won by the Newcastle Knights who defeated the Manly-Warringah Sea Eagles 22–16 at the Sydney Football Stadium before a crowd of 42,482.
- 12 October – Christchurch, New Zealand: The 1997 New Zealand season culminates in the Waikato Cougars 34–18 victory over the Canterbury Reds at Rugby League Park, Waikato defeated Canterbury 34–18 to win both the Challenge Cup and the Rugby League Cup.
- 18 October – Auckland, New Zealand: In the 1997 World Club Championship's final, the Brisbane Broncos defeat the Hunter Mariners 36–12 at Ericsson Stadium before a crowd of 12,000.
- In the Super League II, on Sunday 28 September, with the final of the Premiership was won by Wigan Warriors who defeated St. Helens 33–20. At the end of the season Bradford Bulls were crowned League champions by virtue of finishing the season at the top of the table.
- 16 November – Leeds, England: In the third and deciding test match of the Super League Test series, Australia defeat Great Britain 37–20 at Elland Road before a crowd of 39,337.

== Rugby union ==
- 103rd Five Nations Championship series is won by France who complete the Grand Slam

== Snooker ==
- World Snooker Championship – Ken Doherty beats Stephen Hendry 18–12
- World rankings – Stephen Hendry remains world number one for 1997/98

== Swimming ==
- March 28 – Japan's Ayari Aoyama breaks Misty Hyman's world record in the Women's 100m Butterfly (short course): 58:24
- Third World Short Course Championships, held in Gothenburg, Sweden (April 17 – 20)
  - April 19 – U.S.–swimmer Jenny Thompson breaks Ayari Aoyama's world record in the Women's 100m Butterfly (short course): 57:79
  - April 20 – Australia wins the most medals (17), and the most gold medals (9)
- 23rd European LC Championships, held in Seville, Spain (August 19 – 24)
  - Germany wins the most medals (19), and the most gold medals (8)
- XIX Summer Universiade, held on Sicily, Italy (August 24 – 30)

== Taekwondo ==
- World Championships held in Hong Kong

== Tennis ==
- Grand Slam in tennis men's results:
  1. Australian Open – Pete Sampras
  2. French Open – Gustavo Kuerten
  3. Wimbledon championships – Pete Sampras
  4. U.S. Open – Patrick Rafter
- Grand Slam in tennis women's results:
  1. Australian Open – Martina Hingis
  2. French Open – Iva Majoli
  3. Wimbledon championships – Martina Hingis
  4. U.S. Open – Martina Hingis
- Davis Cup – Sweden won 5–0 over the United States in world tennis.

== Volleyball ==
- Men's World League: Italy
- Women's World Grand Prix: Russia
- Men's European Championship: Netherlands
- Women's European Championship: Russia

== Water polo ==
- Men's World Cup: USA
- Men's European Championship: Hungary
- Women's European Championship: Italy

== Multi-sport events ==
- Second East Asian Games held in Busan, South Korea
- 8th Pan Arab Games held in Beirut, Lebanon
- Fifth World Games held in Lahti, Finland
- 13th Mediterranean Games held in Bari, Italy
- 19th Summer Universiade held on Sicily, Italy
- 19th SEA Games held on Jakarta, Indonesia
- 18th Winter Universiade held in Muju County, South Korea

== Awards ==
- Associated Press Male Athlete of the Year – Tiger Woods, PGA golf
- Associated Press Female Athlete of the Year – Martina Hingis, Tennis
