= List of events broadcast on Wide World of Sports (American TV program) =

ABC's Wide World of Sports was intended to be a fill-in show for a single summer season, until the start of fall sports seasons, but became unexpectedly popular. The goal of the program was to showcase sports from around the globe that were seldom, if ever, broadcast on American television. It originally ran for two hours on Saturday afternoons, but was later reduced to 90 minutes.

Usually, "Wide World" featured two or three events per show. These included many types not previously seen on American television, such as hurling, rodeo, curling, jai-alai, firefighter's competitions, wrist wrestling, powerlifting, surfing, logger sports, demolition derby, slow pitch softball, barrel jumping, and badminton. NASCAR Grand National/Winston Cup racing was a Wide World of Sports staple until the late 1980s, when it became a regularly scheduled sporting event on the network. Traditional Olympic sports such as figure skating, skiing, gymnastics and track and field competitions were also regular features of the show. Another memorable regular feature in the 1960s and 1970s was Mexican cliff diving. The lone national television broadcast of the Continental Football League was a Wide World of Sports broadcast of the 1966 championship game; ABC paid the league $500 for a rights fee, a minuscule sum by professional football standards.

Wide World of Sports was the first American television program to air coverage of – among events – Wimbledon (1961), the Indianapolis 500 (highlights starting in 1961; a longer-form version in 1965), the NCAA Men's Basketball Championship (1962), the Daytona 500 (1962), the U.S. Figure Skating Championships (1962), the Monaco Grand Prix (1962), the Little League World Series (1961), The British Open Golf Tournament (1961), the X-Games (1994) and the Grey Cup (1962).

== 1960s ==
=== 1961 ===
Day	Event
April 29	The first edition of WWOS; Penn Relays from Franklin Field in Philadelphia; Drake Relays from Des Moines, Iowa.
May 6	Oklahoma vs Syracuse football game
May 13	PBA World Championship from Paramus, New Jersey
May 20	FA Cup Soccer Final from London.
May 27	Indianapolis 500 Time Trials.
June 3	World Championship tennis from Mexico City
June 10	Canada Cup Golf Championship
June 17	Le Mans Grand Prix
June 24 & July 1	National AAU Track & Field Championships.
July 8	Firecracker 250 stock car race, Masters Water-Skiing Tournament
July 15	National Gymnastics Championships
July 22	USA-USSR Track & Field Meet in Moscow.
July 29	Japanese All-Star baseball
August 5	Frontier Days rodeo from Cheyenne
August 12	Women's AAU Swimming and Diving Championships from Philadelphia.
August 19	Arnold Palmer vs. Gary Player golf match
August 26	Men's AAU Swimming and Diving Championships.
September 2	World Water Ski Championships
September 9	American Football League Opening Game: San Diego at Dallas

=== 1962 ===
Day	Event
January 7	AFL All-Star Game
January 14	World Barrel Jumping Championships
January 21	Water-Skiing championships from Acapulco
January 28	Oregon Invitational Indoor Track Meet
February 4	National Ski Jumping Championships
February 11	Los Angeles Invitational from the Los Angeles Sports Arena, Jim Beatty sets indoor mile record of 3:58.9, becoming the first man in history to run a sub-4:00 mile indoors.
February 18	Bob-sledding championships from Garmisch-Partenkirchen, Germany, and men's finals in surfing.
February 25	First coverage of the NASCAR 500 Stock Car Championship from Daytona Beach, Florida
March 4 and 11	World Skiing Games from Chamonix, France
March 25	NCAA Basketball Championship: Cincinnati – Ohio State from Louisville.
April 1	World Figure Skating Championships for the first time from Prague, Czechoslovakia.
April 14	Grand National Steeplechase from Aintree.
June 10	Grand Prix of Monaco.
July 1	Masters Water Ski Tournament
July 15	British Open from Troon, Scotland.
September 15 & 22	America's Cup from Newport, R.I.

=== 1963 ===
Day	Event
January 19	Jim Beatty receives the first Wide World of Sports Athlete of the Year Award.
February 2	World Bobsled Championships from Innsbruck, Austria.
March 16	New England Invitational Dog Sled Race.
March 24	Men's Indoor National AAU Swimming & Diving Championships, Yale University, New Haven, Conn
March 30	Holmenkollen Ski Jumping Championship from Oslo, Norway.
May 11	Pan American Games from São Paulo, Brazil.
May 18	Trout Fishing Expedition from Argentina.
June 9	Grand Prix of Monaco.
July 6	First Wide World of Sports broadcast of Wimbledon.
August 17	USA-USSR Track & Field Meet.
August 24	The first broadcast of the Little League World Series from Williamsport, Pa.
September 22	1963 Italian Grand Prix, Jim Clark won the Italian Grand Prix and his first title
December 28	Davis Cup final between the United States and Australia from Adelaide, Australia.

=== 1964 ===
Day	Event
January 4	The World Barrel Jumping Championship from Grossinger, New York and the Orange Bowl Regatta from Miami, Florida
January 11	The International Ski Jumping Championship from Innsbruck, Austria and the International Surfing Championships from Makaha Beach in Hawaii
January 18	Peggy Fleming wins the first of five consecutive national titles at the age of 15 at the U.S. Figure Skating Championships in Cleveland, Ohio.
January 25	World Cyclo Ball Championship from Basel, Switzerland.
February 1	Championship Tarpon Fishing from Big Pine Key, Florida and National Ice Boat Racing from Green Lake, Wisconsin
February 8	The finals of the Fort Worth Rodeo
February 15	The New York Athletic Club indoor track meet
April 11	Challenger Cassius Clay, soon to adopt the Muslim name of Muhammad Ali, knocks out champion Sonny Liston in the seventh round in Miami Beach, Florida
May 16	A group of climbers, three Frenchmen and one Englishman, climb the northwest tower of the Eiffel Tower.
May 30	U.S. Olympic Boxing Trials.
June 27	Interview with Jim Bunning after his perfect game against the New York Mets.
July 11	British Open from St. Andrews.
July 25	Vera Čáslavska wins the all-around in a USA-Czechoslovakia dual meet.
August 15	U.S. National Swimming Championships in Los Altos, California
August 22	All-American Soap Box Derby broadcast from Akron, Ohio.
August 29	Little League World Series.
September 6	1964 Italian Grand Prix, John Surtees won the Italian Grand Prix from Bruce McLaren
September 26	Oklahoma Live Rattlesnake Hunt.
November 21	National 100 in Sacramento.

=== 1965 ===
Day	Event	Commentators	Reporters
March 13	International Toboggan Championship, better known as the Cresta Run, from St. Moritz, Switzerland.		
March 20	American Internationals features the first appearance by Jean-Claude Killy on WWOS.		
March 27	Live coverage of the 1965 12 Hours of Sebring	Charlie Brockman; Phil Hill	Chris Economaki; Les Keiter
April 10	In addition to the U.S. National Men's Swimming and Diving Championships, the show featured Robert F. Kennedy's ascent of Mt. Kennedy in Canada, to place the family flag atop the mountain named in honor of his brother, and a segment on the Houston Astrodome with Roger Maris trying to hit the roof of the stadium.		
April 17	NCAA Wrestling Championships.		
May 29	The rematch between Muhammad Ali and Sonny Liston from Lewiston, Maine.		
May 30	Grand Prix of Monaco.	Jim McKay; Phil Hill	
June 5	First coverage of the Indianapolis 500 on Wide World of Sports after covering the time trials the four previous years.	Charlie Brockman; Rodger Ward	
June 19	Live coverage via satellite of the 1965 24 Hours of Le Mans	Jim McKay; Phil Hill	Chris Economaki
July 24	Coverage of the Matterhorn Climb from Zermatt, Switzerland.		
August 1	USA-USSR Track & Field Meet, live from the Soviet Union.		
August 7	1965 German Grand Prix; Jim Clark showed everyone by winning the race and the drivers championship.		
September 11	Southern 500 stock car race.	Jim McKay; Rodger Ward	

=== 1966 ===
Day	Event		
January 1	Horse racing on Ice from St. Moritz becomes the first Wide World of Sports segment in color.		
February 26	European Cup basketball from Milan, Italy.		
April 2	Muhammad Ali defeats George Chuvalo in a 15-round decision to retain his World Heavyweight Championship in Toronto, Canada. 1966 12 Hours of Sebring		
April 9	AAU Indoor Swimming & Diving Championships.		
May 7	Willie Mays hits his 512th home run, breaking the all-time National League record.		
May 21	Muhammad Ali retains his World Heavyweight Championship title with a sixth-round TKO of Henry Cooper in London.		
June 18	Live coverage of Le Mans Grand Prix	Charlie Brockman; Phil Hill	Chris Economaki
July 30	Jim Ryun sets his first world mile record in Berkeley at the age of 19, breaking the previous mark by 2.3 seconds.		
September 10	Muhammad Ali defeats Karl Mildenberger in a heavyweight title defense, live from Frankfurt, West Germany with a 12th-round TKO.		
October 8	International Figure Skating Revue in Berlin.		
November 26	Muhammad Ali defends his world heavyweight title for the sixth time in 1966 on Wide World of Sports against Cleveland Williams.		
December 24	World Alpine Ski Championships from Portillo, Chile.		
December 31	Grand Prix of America.		

=== 1967 ===
Day	Events	Commentary	Reporters
January 28	Joie Chitwood's Auto Thrill Show from N.Y.		
February 11	Muhammad Ali unifies his World Heavyweight Championship against Ernie Terrell in Houston, Texas.		
March 4	World Figure Skating Championships in Vienna, Austria.		
March 11	Interview with Muhammad Ali and Wilt Chamberlain.		
March 25	Evel Knievel debuts on Wide World of Sports by clearing 15 cars as a filler act during motorcycle races in Gardena, California		
April 8	AAU Indoor Championships in Dallas.		
April 22	London to Brighton Antique Car Run.		
May 10	Grand Prix of Monaco Denny Hulme won a tragic race in which Lorenzo Bandini died. This was first color broadcast of the Monaco race.	Jim McKay; Phil Hill	
May 20	Mickey Mantle hits his 500th home run.		
May 27	English Rugby League Cup Final.		
June 3	British yachtsman Sir Francis Chichester completes his 28,500-mile around the world trip.		
June 10	A. J. Foyt wins the Indianapolis 500.	Jim McKay; Rodger Ward	Chris Economaki
June 24	National AAU Track & Field Championships in Bakersfield, California. Jim Ryun set a world record in the Mile run, 3:51.1 which lasted for eight years. The mark remained the American record until the Dream Mile in 1981, also on Wide World of Sports.		
July 1	A. J. Foyt and Dan Gurney win the Le Mans 24-Hour Grand Prix of Endurance.	Jim McKay; Phil Hill	Chris Economaki
July 29 & August 5	Pan American Games from Winnipeg, Manitoba, Canada.		

=== 1968 ===
Day	Event
January 27	Wide World of Sports' first journey to the village of Kitzbühel for alpine ski racing.
March 2 & 9	World Figure Skating Championships from Geneva.
March 9	International Cliff Diving Championships from Acapulco.
March 30	Jean-Claude Killy is featured in races from Rossland, British Columbia.
June 8	Pre-empted by Senator Robert Kennedy's Funeral.
June 15	Indianapolis 500.
June 29	Old Man of Hoy Rock Climb in Scotland.
September 7	U.S. Men's Olympic Swimming Trials.
September 14 & 21	U.S. Olympic Men's Track & Field Trials from Echo Summit, California.
November 9	Grand Prix of Mexico.

=== 1969 ===
Day	Event
January 4	Hula Bowl in Hawaii
January 11	Mexican 1000 Cross Country Road Racing Championships.
February 8	U.S. Figure Skating Championships in Seattle.
March 1	World Figure Skating Championships in Colorado Springs, Colo.
March 29	NCAA Swimming Championships.
May 3	Game 6 of the NBA Finals between the Los Angeles Lakers and the Boston Celtics.
June 7	Indianapolis 500.
June 28	World Heavyweight Championship fight between Joe Frazier and Jerry Quarry, won by Frazier in the seventh round, plus Olympic champion George Foreman's first professional fight against Don Waldheim
July 26	Vince Lombardi's first day of training camp with the Washington Redskins.
August 23	Little League World Series.
October 18	Lew Alcindor makes his pro debut with the Milwaukee Bucks.

== 1970s ==
=== 1970 ===
Day	Event
January 3	Howard Cosell interviews Curt Flood about the Major League Baseball Reserve Clause.
January 17	World Wristwrestling Championships from Petaluma, California
February 21	Joe Frazier knocks out Jimmy Ellis in the fifth round for the vacant World Heavyweight Championship from New York City.
February 28	1970 Daytona 500
March 14	World Figure Skating Championships in Ljubljana, Yugoslavia.
March 21	International Ski Flying Championship from Oberstdorf. On his third jump, Vinko Bogataj tumbled down the jump and became forever more the "agony of defeat".
March 28	Report on Buddy Baker breaking the world closed-course speed record of over 200 mph at Talladega Superspeedway. Phoenix 150 – Live coverage of the race in segments. Florida Derby – Live coverage of three races.
April 18	1970 Gwyn Staley 400 – Live Coverage of the latter stages of the race.
May 2	Dan Gable loses his final match in collegiate competition to Larry Owings of Washington at the NCAA Championships. It was the only loss of his collegiate career.
May 9	1970 Rebel 400 – Live Coverage of the latter stages of the race.
May 10	1970 Monaco Grand Prix
June 6	1970 Indianapolis 500
June 13	World Invitational High Diving Championship in Montreal, Canada; LeMans 24-Hour Grand Prix of Endurance from Le Mans, France.
July 4	1970 Firecracker 400
July 25	1970 Nashville 420 – Live Coverage of the latter stages of the race.
October 31	In Atlanta, Muhammad Ali defeats Jerry Quarry in the third round, in his first fight in three years.
November 14	World Gymnastics Championships in Ljubljana, Yugoslavia.
November 21	Joe Frazier knocks out Bob Foster in the second round of their World Heavyweight Championship fight in Detroit.
December 26	World Cup Soccer final.

=== 1971 ===
Day	Event
January 23	Tyler Palmer records the first-ever World Cup victory in Europe in alpine skiing for the United States in St. Moritz.
February 13	USA-USSR gymnastics meet from University Park, Pa.
February 20	World Weightlifting Championships in Columbus, Ohio.
February 20	Daytona 500.
March 13	Analysis of the World Heavyweight Championship fight between Muhammad Ali and Joe Frazier with Muhammad Ali. Plus a report on Mario Andretti's victory in the Grand Prix of South Africa.
April 10	Bobby Isaac wins the 1971 Greenville 200 at Greenville-Pickens Speedway in South Carolina in the first ever live flag-to-flag television coverage of a NASCAR race.
April 17	The U.S. Table Tennis Team, following its historic trip inside the People's Republic of China, appears on Wide World of Sports live via satellite from Tokyo with its own "home movies" of their trip.
June 5	Grand Prix of Monaco.
August 28	Coverage of the USA–Cuba volleyball match from Havana marks the first time an American television network sports department covers a sports event in Cuba since Premier Fidel Castro came to power in 1959.

=== 1972 ===
Day	Event
January 22	U.S. Figure Skating Championships.
January 29	Jim Ryun faces 1968 Olympic Games rival Kip Keino in an indoor mile run in Los Angeles.
February 12	International Bikini Sports Competition from Rosarito Beach, Mexico.
February 26	President Richard Nixon and Premier Zhou Enlai attend the Chinese Gymnastics Exhibition.
February 26	A. J. Foyt becomes the first man to win the Indianapolis 500, 24 Hours of Le Mans and the Daytona 500.
April 1	Mark Spitz finishes his collegiate career at Indiana with victories in the 100- and 200-yard butterflies.
April 15	USA-People's Republic of China Table Tennis competition from Detroit.
June 3	Steve Prefontaine wins the third of four consecutive NCAA titles in the 5000 meters on his home track of Hayward Field in Eugene.
July 8, 15 & 22	World Chess Championships between Bobby Fischer and Boris Spassky from Reykjavík, Iceland.
August 19	U.S. Olympic Swimming Trials features Mark Spitz taking a critical step towards the Olympics.
September 5 & 6	The Munich massacre killed 11 Israelis, 5 terrorists and 1 police officer.
September 23	Muhammad Ali ends the career of former world heavyweight champion Floyd Patterson with a seventh-round knockout in New York City.
November 25	Muhammad Ali vs. Bob Foster fight, the World Ski Flying Championships and a report on Olga Korbut.

=== 1973 ===
Day	Event
January 13	The Harlem Globetrotters make their debut on Wide World of Sports.
January 27	World Heavyweight Championship fight between Joe Frazier and George Foreman from Kingston, Jamaica.
March 3	World Figure Skating Championships in Bratislava, Czechoslovakia.
March 24	Olga Korbut and the USSR Gymnastics Team visit New York City for a performance in Madison Square Garden.
March 31	Ken Norton wins a 12-round decision against Muhammad Ali in their heavyweight fight from San Diego, California.
May 26	USA-China gymnastics meet in Madison Square Garden.
June 16	Monaco Grand Prix; Jackie Stewart win equals Jim Clark's all-time record.
August 4	Dutch Grand Prix; Jackie Stewart wins a tragic race which Roger Williamson was burned to death. Stewart's win broke Jim Clark's all-time record.
August 11	German Grand Prix; Jackie Stewart wins his 27th and final Grand Prix victory.
September 15	Muhammad Ali wins his rematch with Ken Norton rematch in 12 rounds.
November 10	Triple Crown winner Secretariat's final race from Toronto, Ontario.
November 10	Evel Knievel jumps over 50 smashed cars in the Coliseum in Los Angeles.

=== 1974 ===
Day	Event
January 6	The Harlem Globetrotters in London.
January 26	Muhammad Ali and Joe Frazier scuffle during the telecast as they watch tape of their first fight in 1971.
February 9	U.S. Figure Skating Championships
February 17	Evel Knievel jumps 11 Mack trucks in Highland Falls, Texas. The show, which also included the National Finals Rodeo.
March 2	Muhammad Ali defeats Joe Frazier in their second fight in New York City.
March 16	Roberto Durán knocks out Esteban De Jesús in the 11th round to retain his World Lightweight championship from Panama City, Panama.
March 17	World Figure Skating Championships from Munich.
March 31	George Foreman scores a second-round TKO of Ken Norton in a World Heavyweight Championship fight.
April 7	Oxford-Cambridge Regatta.
May 26	1974 Monaco Grand Prix
August 31	Evel Knievel's daredevil motorcycle jump in Toronto and Philippe Petit's high wire walk from New York City.
September 14	Evel Knievel attempts to jump the Snake River Canyon in Twin Falls, Idaho in a machine called a skycycle in front of 33,000 fans. The parachute opened prematurely and Evel crashed into the canyon wall and had to be pulled out of the water.
September 21	Wide World of Sports returns to Havana, Cuba for the World Boxing Championships, which featured Teófilo Stevenson.
October 6	1974 United States Grand Prix: Emerson Fittipaldi won the F1 championship and was interviewed by Jackie Stewart but it was a tragic race when Helmut Koinigg died.

=== 1975 ===
Day	Event
January 5	Muhammad Ali knocks out George Foreman in the eighth round to reclaim the World Heavyweight title from Kinshasa, Zaire.
January 19	Philippe Petit high wire walks between the two towers of the cathedral in Laon, France.
March 29	Muhammad Ali scores a 15th-round TKO of Chuck Wepner in their World Heavyweight Championship fight.
May 25	1975 Monaco Grand Prix.
May 31	Evel Knievel's attempt to jump 140 feet over 13 double-deck buses in Wembley Stadium in London ends in failure when he's thrown off his bike on the landing ramp and has the motorcycle land on top of him.
June 28 & August 9	Nadia Comăneci wins the all-around and three of four individual apparatus finals at the European Women's Gymnastics Championships in Skien, Norway.
July 26	Coverage of the North American Continental Boxing Championships.
July 26	First Wide World of Sports coverage of the Tour de France.
August 16	Coverage of John Walker's world mile record of 3:49.4 in Gothenburg, Sweden, making him the first to break the 3:50 barrier.
September 13	World Heavyweight Championship fight between Muhammad Ali and Joe Bugner from Kuala Lumpur, Malaysia.
October 4	National Drag Racing Championships
October 25	Evel Knievel jumps for the first time since his crash in Wembley Stadium and clears 14 Greyhound buses. The show, from Kings Island in Kings Mills, Ohio, ranks as the highest rated show in the history of Wide World of Sports.

=== 1976 ===
Day	Event
January 1	Olga Korbut and the USSR Gymnasts Team visit Disneyland.
January 11	Wide World of Sports telecasts tape of Muhammad Ali defeating Joe Frazier in the "Thriller in Manila" heavyweight title fight.
January 25	The Harlem Globetrotters play at the Attica Correctional Facility in New York.
February 29	USA-Romania gymnastics featuring Nadia Comăneci.
March 7	World Figure Skating Championships in Gothenburg, Sweden.
March 21	Dorothy Hamill parade in Greenwich, Conn.
March 28	American Cup Gymnastics Championships.
May 22	Dorothy Hamill's last amateur performance.
May 30	1976 Monaco Grand Prix
June 26	U.S. Olympic Track and Field Trials from Eugene, Oregon
October 2	Exclusive Sports Illustrated still photographs of the Muhammad Ali-Ken Norton heavyweight fight and interviews with Ken Norton, Joe Frazier and George Foreman.
October 30	Evel Knievel's final jump on Wide World of Sports is over seven Greyhound buses in the Kingdome in Seattle. Mario Andretti wins the Japanese Grand Prix but James Hunt finishes third and crowned world champion by one point over Niki Lauda.

=== 1977 ===
Day	Event
January 2	Interview with Muhammad Ali.
January 22	Profile of 16-year-old apprentice jockey Steve Cauthen.
January 23	The USA-People's Republic of China gymnastics meet from Peking.
February 5	U.S. Figure Skating Championships in Hartford, Conn.
February 12	A special gymnastics competition from South Bend, Ind. features Olga Korbut and Nellie Kim and the USSR gymnastics team. That marked Olga's final competitive appearance on Wide World of Sports.
February 19	Coverage of the Mr. Universe contest.
February 20	Chinese Acrobats of Taiwan. International Tooggan (Cresta) Championships from San Moritz
March 5	World Figure Skating Championships in Tokyo, Japan.
May 7	Seattle Slew, who would go on to become the first Triple Crown winner in 29 years, won the Flamingo Stakes (March 26) and the Wood Memorial (April 23) on his way to the Kentucky Derby title.
May 14	Sugar Ray Leonard defeats Willie Rodriguez in the second fight of his professional career.
May 22	1977 Monaco Grand Prix
July 2	USA-USSR Track and Field Meet from Sochi, USSR.
July 23	Arthur Ashe's report on Apartheid and sports in South Africa.
September 3	USA-East Germany Swimming and Diving Meet.
October 1	Pelé's farewell game between the club he started his career with, the Santos, and the club he finished his career with, the New York Cosmos.
October 29	The ascent of mountain climber George Willig to the top of Eldorado Canyon in Eldorado Springs, Colorado

=== 1978 ===
Day	Event
January 21	Olympic gold medalist Nadia Comăneci performs at Madison Square Garden.
February 4 & 5	World Alpine Ski Championships from Garmisch, West Germany.
February 12	USA-Cuba Amateur boxing marks the first live telecast from Cuba since Castro came to power in 1959.
February 25	Great Pool Shootout: a US$15,000 match between Minnesota Fats and Willie Mosconi at the Waldorf Astoria Hotel in New York City.
March 11	World Figure Skating Championships in Ottawa, Ontario.
March 12	Affirmed's first race as a 3-year-old.
March 18	Jimmy Bryan 150 live from Avondale.
April 1	Olga Korbut's retirement ceremonies in Moscow.
April 2	Alydar's victory in the Florida Derby.
April 22	George Willig's climb of Angel's Landing in Zion National Park almost ends a bit early when he falls on the way up, but he was able to complete the climb.
April 23	Gabriel 200 live from Trenton. George Willig's climb of Angel's Landing in Zion National Park almost ends a bit early when he falls on the way up, but he was able to complete the climb.
May 7	1978 Monaco Grand Prix
July 8	USA-USSR Track and Field Meet from Berkeley.
August 26 & September 2	World Swimming Championships from West Berlin.
September 16	Gould Grand Prix Live from Brooklyn, Michigan. Grand Prix of Italy in Monza Mario Andretti won the Championship sadly his teammate and rival Ronnie Peterson died in the first chicane pileup .
October 1	Daily Express Indy Silverstone
October 28	World All-Around Gymnastics Championships.

=== 1979 ===
Day	Event
January 13	World Gymnastics Championships.
January 14	The fifth highest rated show in the history of Wide World of Sports, featuring the Harlem Globetrotters.
February 4	Alexis Argüello vs. Alfredo Escalera for the WBC Super Featherweight title. Argüello retained his title with a 13th-round knockout.
February 10	Spectacular Bid's first race as a 3-year-old in the Hutcheson Stakes.
March 4	American Olympic medal hopeful Phil Mahre breaks his leg during a World Cup giant slalom in Lake Placid.
March 17	World Figure Skating Championships in Vienna, Austria.
March 18	World Ski Flying Championships from Planica, Yugoslavia.
April 28	George Willig's Devils Tower climb in Wyoming: a free climb of Devils Tower's 700-foot face.
May 13	World Table Tennis Championships in Pyongyang, North Korea.
May 27	1979 Monaco Grand Prix
June 9	At the World Cup in Tokyo, Nadia Comăneci scores two perfect 10.0s en route to the all-around title.
December 15	World All-Around Gymnastics Championships.

== 1980s ==
=== 1980 ===
Day	Event
January 12	Hahnenkamm downhill in Kitzbühel.
February 9	In the final tune-up for the Americans prior to the Olympic Games, the United States hockey team is crushed 10–3 by the Soviet Union. The show also included Shirley Muldowney's first victory in the Winternationals.
February 17	World Gymnastics Championships from Fort Worth, Texas. The same show includes the World Frisbee Championships.
February 24	Olympic Games awards ceremony for the United States hockey team following its 4–2 victory over Finland.
March 23	The first telecast on Wide World of Sports the Endurance (now called the Ironman) Triathlon World Championship from Oahu.
May 17	Preakness Stakes.
May 18	1980 Monaco Grand Prix
May 24	Women's volleyball from Peking between the United States, China and Japan.
May 31	George Willig climbs Castleton Tower in Utah.
July 19	Sugar Ray Leonard vs. Roberto Durán fight for the WBC Welterweight Championship.
August 16	U.S. National Swimming Championships.
September 27	In his second bid for the WBA/WBC Middleweight championship, Marvelous Marvin Hagler scores a third-round TKO of Alan Minter in a fight marred by a crowd riot.
December 27	U.S. Figure Skaters in China: A Special Performance.

=== 1981 ===
Day	Event
January 17	The Harlem Globetrotters Go Hollywood.
February 7 & 8	U.S. Figure Skating Championships.
March 7	World Figure Skating Championships in Hartford, Conn.
March 8	Nadia Comăneci and the Romanian gymnastics team performs at Madison Square Garden.
March 28	Report on Phil Mahre winning the overall World Cup title from Borovetz, Bulgaria.
April 5	NCAA Championships in Austin close the door on Rowdy Gaines' career with American records in the 100- and 200-yard freestyles before he announces his retirement.
April 18	Wood Memorial.
July 11	Dream Mile from Oslo.
July 11	USA-USSR Track and Field Meet from Leningrad.
August 29	Report on week of mile world records: Steve Ovett in West Germany and Sebastian Coe in Belgium. Ovett lowered the mark to 3:48.40, then Coe lowered it to 3:47.33.
September 5	Salvador Sánchez retains his WBC Featherweight Championship with a victory over Wilfredo Gómez.
October 17	Sugar Ray Leonard scores a 14th-round TKO of Thomas Hearns in a WBC/WBA Welterweight Championship fight.

=== 1982 ===
Day	Event
January 16	The Harlem Globetrotters at Walt Disney World.
February 6 & 7	World Alpine Ski Championships.
February 6	Brian Boitano makes his debut on Wide World of Sports.
February 14	Special ice skating performance by Peggy Fleming from Lake Tahoe.
February 21	Ironman triathlon race leader Julie Moss collapses just 440 yards from the finish of the marathon run. She struggled to her feet and wobbled to within 100 yards of the finish where she collapsed again. She started to crawl, but was passed by Kathleen McCartney only 10 yards from the finish line. Moss and McCartney appear in the WWOS studios the following week to discuss the finish.
March 14	World Figure Skating Championships.
June 26	Bislett Games in Oslo.
July 11	1982 FIFA World Cup Final from Estadio Santiago Bernabéu, Madrid, Spain marks the first time the match was telecast live on an American television network.
August 21	U.S. Platform Diving Championships.
August 27	Little League World Series.
November 27	Teófilo Stevenson fights Tyrell Biggs from Reno, Nev.
December 11	Rafael Limón loses his WBC Super Featherweight Championship to Bobby Chacon in a 15-round decision, while Wilfredo Gómez retained his WBC Super Bantamweight title against Lupe Pinto.

=== 1983 ===
Day	Event
January 22	The Harlem Globetrotters return to New York City.
February 27	Dave Scott wins his second Ironman Triathlon World Championship in Hawaii. During that same show, Shirley Muldowney, wins her second title at the Winternational Drag Racing Championships in Pomona.
March 12	Mary Lou Retton makes her first appearance on Wide World of Sports at the American Cup.
April 17 & 23	The Great American Bike Race from Santa Monica, California to New York City.
May 15	1983 Monaco Grand Prix
June 25	U.S. Outdoor Track and Field Championships in Indianapolis.
July 2	The National Sports Festival, now known as the Olympic Festival, in Colorado Springs
August 6	U.S. Swimming Championships.
August 20	The International Special Olympics from Baton Rouge, La. It becomes the first sports show to win a Christopher Award.
September 24	Report on the America's Cup.
November 5	World Gymnastics Championships from Budapest, Hungary.

=== 1984 ===
Day	Event
January 7	The Harlem Globetrotters in Hong Kong.
January 21	The men's and ladies' finals at the U.S. Figure Skating Championships in Salt Lake City.
January 21	Franz Klammer records his fourth victory on the famed Hahnenkamm in Kitzbühel, Austria.
February 18	The USA-Cuba amateur boxing matches from Reno.
February 19 & 25	Race Across America.
March 17	World Gymnastics Championships in Budapest.
March 24	Mark Breland attempts to win his fifth New York Golden Gloves title.
March 31	Swale wins the Florida Derby.
May 5 & 12	The American Cup provides the American gymnasts with their final major international competition prior to the Olympic Games.
May 26	Farewell ice skating performances by Scott Hamilton and Torvill and Dean.
June 3	1984 Monaco Grand Prix.
July 7	Firecracker 400 Stock Car Race from Daytona Beach.
July 21	Final performance by Nadia Comăneci from Bucharest, Romania.
September 8 & 22	The World Cycling Championships from Barcelona, Spain.

=== 1985 ===
Day	Event
January 5	Live coverage of Mark Breland's second professional fight against Marlon Palmer in Atlantic City, N.J.
January 12	Hahnenkamm Downhill in Kitzbühel.
January 20	Second professional fights of Pernell Whitaker (vs Danny Avery), Evander Holyfield (vs Eric Winbush) and Meldrick Taylor (vs Dwight Pratchett), live, from Atlantic City.
February 3	Brian Boitano wins the first of four consecutive national titles at the U.S. Figure Skating Championships in Kansas City. In the same show, Pirmin Zurbriggen wins the downhill at the World Alpine Ski Championships in Bormio, Italy.
February 10	World Alpine Ski Championships in Bormio, Italy.
February 16	The Harlem Globetrotters in New Orleans.
April 6	Matt Biondi sets his first individual American records in the 100- and 200-yard freestyles at the NCAA Championships in Austin, Texas.
April 20	The second professional fight of Olympic gold medalist Tyrell Biggs.
May 18	UCLA Invitational Track and Field Meet.
May 19	1985 Monaco Grand Prix.
June 8	Barry McGuigan defeats Eusebio Pedroza to claim the WBA Welterweight title in London.
July 27	Wide World of Sports coverage, via satellite, of the Dream Mile from Oslo, Norway.
August 24	Microminiature camera in the mask of a home plate umpire was introduced during Wide World of Sports live coverage of the Little League World Series from Williamsport, Pa.
September 28	Barry McGuigan defends his WBA Welterweight title against Bernard Taylor in Belfast, Northern Ireland.

=== 1986 ===
Day	Event
January 11	The Harlem Globetrotters visit Kansas City.
January 18	World Gymnastics Championships in Montreal, Quebec.
February 8	U.S. Figure Skating Championships in Uniondale, N.Y.
February 15	Barry McGuigan defends his WBA Welterweight title against Danilo Cabreira in Dublin, Ireland.
March 8	Daniela Silivaş wins the gold medal in the balance beam at the World Championships in Montreal, Quebec.
March 15	Report on the comeback of Shirley Muldowney.
March 15	NCAA Wrestling Championships.
March 29	In a delayed broadcast, "Marvelous" Marvin Hagler knocks out John "The Beast" Mugabi in the 11th-round of their World Middleweight Championship.
April 6	Santa Anita Derby.
May 24	Grand Prix of Monaco.
June 28	Irish Derby in Kildare.
July 5	Dream Mile.
July 12	Evander Holyfield wins his first world title with a 15-round decision against Dwight Muhammad Qawi for the WBA Junior Heavyweight crown live from Atlanta.
July 26	Mike Tyson destroys Marvis Frazier with a first-round knockout in their live heavyweight fight from Glenn Falls, N.Y. In the same show, Barry McGuigan loses his WBA Welterweight crown in a 15-round decision to Steve Cruz in Las Vegas.
August 30	Men's World Cup Gymnastics Championships from Beijing, China.

=== 1987 ===
Day	Event
January 10	The last live telecast of the Harlem Globetrotters from Kansas City.
January 17	Ironman Triathlon.
January 31	World Alpine Ski Championships.
February 1 & 7	Report on America's Cup yacht races from Fremantle, Australia.
February 7	U.S. Figure Skating Championships in Tacoma, Washington
February 28	Women's World Cup individual finals from Beijing.
March 1	Race Across America.
March 21	Iowa State ends Iowa's nine-year run as team champion at the NCAA Wrestling Championships, while John Smith wins his first NCAA title.
March 22	Mountain Man Winter Triathlon from Avon and Beaver Creak, Colo.
March 29	The first broadcast on Wide World of Sports of the Iditarod Trail Sled Dog Race.
April 11	Pablo Morales concludes his collegiate swimming career with an NCAA record 11 individual titles and Matt Biondi ends his by setting American and NCAA records in the 50, 100 and 200 yard freestyles at the NCAA Championships in Austin, Texas.
May 16	Western States Endurance Race from Squaw Valley to Auburn, California
May 31	1987 Monaco Grand Prix.
June 27	U.S. Outdoor Track and Field Championships in San Jose, California
August 1	Greg Louganis wins the 3-meter and platform at the U.S. Diving Championships in Bartlesville, Okla., while Janet Evans makes her WWOS debut by winning four events at the U.S. Nationals in Clovis, California
August 15	International Special Olympics from Notre Dame, Indiana

=== 1988 ===
Day	Event
January 2	The Harlem Globetrotters journey to West Berlin.
January 23	Ironman Triathlon.
January 30	World Gymnastics Championships from Rotterdam.
March 19	Romanian Aurelia Dobre upsets teammate Daniela Silivaş and Soviet Elena Shoushounova to win the all-around title at the World Gymnastics Championships.
March 26	The battle for the World Cup overall title between Pirmin Zurbriggen and Alberto Tomba is decided in the final races of the year in Saalbach, Austria, with Zurbriggen winning his second straight overall title.
May 7	The Kentucky Derby becomes a fixture on Wide World of Sports and witness a piece of history as Winning Colors became only the third filly to win horse racing's first leg in the triple crown.
May 15	1988 Monaco Grand Prix.
May 21	Preakness Stakes.
June 11	Belmont Stakes.
July 2	Dream Mile in Oslo.
July 16	In an exclusive interview with Wide World of Sports, owner-trainer Louee Russel announces the retirement of Preakness and Belmont winner Risen Star.
July 16 & 23	U.S. Olympic Track and Field Trials.
August 6 & 20	U.S. Olympic Gymnastics Trials.
August 20	Weltklasse Meet.

=== 1989 ===
Day	Event
January 28	The Harlem Globetrotters from Sydney, Australia.
February 4	World Alpine Ski Championships in Vail, Colo.
February 11	U.S. Figure Skating Championships in Baltimore.
March 4	Virgil Hill–Bobby Czyz fight for the WBA Light Heavyweight Championship in Bismarck, North Dakota.
April 8	Santa Anita Derby.
April 1	Evander Holyfield vs. Michael Dokes heavyweight fight and a live studio interview with Holyfield.
April 15	"The Hell of the North": Paris–Roubaix.
May 6	Kentucky Derby.
May 7	Monaco Grand Prix This was last Monaco GP that was broadcast as a traditional episode of Wide World of Sports. ABC would broadcast later Monaco Grands Prix, including at least one under the WWOS title, however it was not the same program.
May 20	Preakness Stakes.
June 10	Belmont Stakes.
June 24	Dennis Andries–Jeff Harding for the WBC Light Heavyweight titles.
July 1–22	Tour de France.
August 26	Little League World Series

== 1990s ==
=== 1990 ===
Day	Event
January 13	The Harlem Globetrotters visit Paradise Island in the Bahamas.
January 27	The men's and ladies' figure skating competition from the World Challenge of Champions in Moscow.
February 3	Bill Shoemaker has one final race at Santa Anita.
February 24	Ironman Triathlon World Championship.
March 3	Same day coverage of the finish of the Trans-Antarctica Expedition from Mirny Station.
March 17	Susan Butcher wins her fourth Iditarod Trail Sled Dog Race.
March 24	Tom Jager shatters the world record for the 50-meter freestyle in a head-to-head battle with Matt Biondi at the U.S. Spring Championships.
March 24	World Gymnastics Championships.
March 31	Meldrick Taylor fights Julio César Chávez for the WBC/IBF Junior Welterweight/Super Lightweight titles.
April 21	Paris–Roubaix.
May 5	Kentucky Derby.
May 12	12-year-old Chinese star Fu Mingxia wins the U.S. International Diving Championships.
July 21	Tour de France.
August 4	Kim Zmeskal wins the all-around at the USA-USSR Gymnastics Meet.

=== 1991 ===
Day	Event
January 19	Men's World Cup Downhill from Wengen is canceled after Gernot Reinstadler of Austria falls during a qualifying run and later dies from internal injuries. Meanwhile, the U.S. Ski Team withdraws from the World Cup circuit due to the Gulf War.
January 26	World champion Svetlana Boginskaya is upset by teammate Tatiana Lisenko in the all-around at the World Cup Gymnastics Championships. Meanwhile, the World Challenge of Champions feature 1984 Olympic Games gold medalists Torvill and Dean,
February 2	The Harlem Globetrotters from Disney MGM Studios in Orlando. Hosted by Jim Valvano, with a special guest appearance by Miss Piggy. Plus, a replay of Whitney Houston singing the National Anthem at Super Bowl XXV. And an interview with quarterback Todd Marinovich after he is suspended from USC football team due to drugs and declares himself eligible for the NFL draft.
February 16	U.S. Figure Skating Championships in Minneapolis. Plus, a feature on Nancy Kerrigan and her legally blind mother Brenda.
March 2	Riddick Bowe versus Tyrell Biggs.
March 16	Rick Swenson wins his record fifth Iditarod Trail Sled Dog Race.
April 13	Tonya Harding performs a triple Axel in her exhibition performance at the U.S. Figure Skating Championships. Plus, Mark Spitz begins his very public comeback to competitive swimming with a spot on the 1992 Olympic team as his goal.
April 27	Mark Spitz meets Matt Biondi in another 50-meter butterfly match race. Biondi wins, but Spitz finishes closer to Biondi than he did to Tom Jager the week before.
April 29	Wide World of Sports' 30th anniversary show with hosts Jim McKay and Frank Gifford.
May 4	Kentucky Derby.
June 1	Mike Tyson scores a TKO of Razor Ruddock in a heavyweight fight, taped on March 18.
June 8	Belmont Stakes.
July 13	As the International Olympic Committee lifts its ban prohibiting South Africa from competing in the Olympics, WWOS features U.S. javelin thrower Tom Petranoff, who was banned by U.S. track officials from worldwide competition for having competed in South Africa in violation of the international sports boycott. Petranoff talks about his relocation to South Africa and his desire to compete for his new country in the Olympics.
August 10	ABC strikes a deal with the U.S. Treasury Department and obtains the exclusive rights to televise the Cuban hosted Pan American Games. The telecast features over 20 hours of comprehensive coverage and a rare look inside Cuba. The highlight of the trip is an ABC WWOS exclusive interview, conducted by Jim McKay with Fidel Castro.

=== 1992 ===
Day	Event
February 1	A special report on Mike Tyson's trial and conviction of rape.
February 29	Kim Zmeskal becomes the first American to win the women's all-around title at the World Championships.
March 14	The pairs figure skating team of Ekaterina Gordeeva and Sergei Grinkov earn six perfect 6.0s for artistic impression to win the World Challenge of Champions.
April 4	An up close and personal look at Bill Shoemaker, one year after a car accident left him paralyzed. Meanwhile, A.P. Indy wins the Santa Anita Derby and Belmont Stakes (on June 6) on Wide World. Those wins would propel him to Horse of the Year honors.
April 11	Jim McKay talks with Arthur Ashe about his battle with AIDS.
May 2	Kentucky Derby.
July 4	Jim McKay reports on Sarajevo, eight years after the 1984 Winter Olympics.
July – August	WWOS cameras follow Dick and Rick Hoyt as they bike across the country. The father and son team begin their trip in Santa Monica, California and end it in Boston.
August 1	1992 AFC-NFC Hall of Fame Game.
August 29	Little League World Series.

=== 1993 ===
Day	Event
January 6	As South Central Los Angeles is in the midst of rebuilding from the riots, WWOS orchestrates a roundtable discussion with gang members at Crenshaw Senior High School.
January 16	WWOS debuts a new series about athletes living on the edge and expanding the horizons of sport, with a feature on Extreme Skiing.
January 23	U.S. Figure Skating Championships.
January 30	Nancy Kerrigan skates an exhibition performance to "The Lord's Prayer".
February 13	World Alpine Skiing Championships and a tribute to Arthur Ashe, who died of complications from AIDS.
March 6	Riddick Bowe defeats Evander Holyfield in their fight from Las Vegas. Plus, Wide World of Sports for Kids makes its debut, with "The Great Alaska Sled Dog Race", a show on the Iditarod sled dog race, from Anchorage to Nome, Alaska.
March 20	1992 Olympic silver medalist Paul Wylie defeats 1988 Olympic gold medalist Brian Boitano for the first time in his professional skating career at the DuraSoft Colors World Challenge of Champions.
April 3	Santa Anita Derby.
April 10	WWOS broadcasts the first-ever World Winter Games (Special Olympics) from Austria.
April 24	World Gymnastics Championships.
May 1	Kentucky Derby.
May 15	Preakness Stakes.
May 22	A retrospective show which features the top 10 elements of WWOS (1961–present). Viewers voted through USA Today for their favorite shows, including A. J. Foyt and the '67 Indy 500, Muhammad Ali and appearances by the Harlem Globetrotters.
June 5	Belmont Stakes.
July 31	1993 AFC-NFC Hall of Fame Game.
August 21	World Track and Field Championships.
August 21	Travers Stakes.
August 28	At the Little League World Series, Maria Sansone, at 12-years of age, becomes the youngest network sports announcer when she covers the LLWS for WWOS.

=== 1994 ===
Day	Event
January 6, 8, 15, 29, and February 5	WWOS begins its 34th season with a new host, Julie Moran, from the U.S. Figure Skating Championships in Detroit. The entire event is overshadowed by the attack on reigning national champion, Nancy Kerrigan, at a practice rink. WWOS correspondents report on the story as it unfolds with exclusive interviews with Kerrigan and they examine Tonya Harding's role in the attack as it comes into question.
January 22	WWOS debuts a joint venture with Sports Illustrated TV's From the Pages of Sports Illustrated with a feature on Archie Manning's son Peyton.
January 29	WWOS debuts its series of features leading up to the 1994 World Cup of soccer, with Jim McKay as host.
January 29	WWOS debuts its WWOS for Kids show, with a repeat telecast of "The Great Alaskan Sled Dog Race." On Feb. 12, "Kids on Ice – A Skating Adventure!" takes a closer look at one young skater's road to the U.S. Junior National Championships. On June 11, "A day at the Races", host Maria Sansone offers a behind the scenes look at horse racing.
April 2	Two events return to WWOS after long hiatuses: from Planica, Slovenia the World Ski Flying Championships and from Silver Springs, Florida, the World High Diving Championships.
April 9, May 21, June 11 and August 20	WWOS tracks the recovery and grueling rehabilitation process undertaken by Jeff Lukas, who was severely injured by thoroughbred race horse Tabasco Cat.
April 23	World Gymnastics Championships.
May 7	WWOS debuts the Cable Cam at the 120th Kentucky Derby. This innovative camera is suspended from a cable in the infield of the track and is able to follow the progress of the horses on the backstretch at speeds of up to 35 mph.
May 14	Feature on the figure skating pairs team of Paul Martini and Barbara Underhill. One of Underhill's twins recently drowned in the family pool. They dedicate their performance at the Durasoft Colors World Challenge of Champions to her child.
July–August	ABC devotes more than 17 hours of comprehensive weekend coverage of the third Goodwill Games from St. Petersburg, Russia.
August 13	On day two of the Major League Baseball strike, Al Michaels moderates a panel discussion from Los Angeles, with Los Angeles Dodgers' player representative Brett Butler, Sports Illustrated Editor-at-Large Steve Wulf in New York and Peter Angelos, principal owner of the Baltimore Orioles in Maryland.
August 20	Al Michaels talks with Bud Selig, acting commissioner of Major League Baseball on day 9 of the 1994–95 Major League Baseball strike. Meanwhile, Holy Bull wins the Travers Stakes.
August 27	A three-hour rain delay forces WWOS to go off the air on many ABC affiliates before the Little League World Series World Championship Game can be completed. The West Coast sees the remainder of the game live from Williamsport, Pa.

=== 1995 ===
Day	Event
January 21	Al Unser Jr. is named WWOS Athlete of the Year after dominating the Indy car circuit with eight victories, including a second Indy 500.
January 28	Julie Moran hosts WWOS from "The NFL Experience" at Joe Robbie Stadium, site of Super Bowl XXIX. Also, Bob Beattie reports on the cancellation of the World Alpine Ski Championships, due to lack of snow, for the first time since the event's inception in 1931. WWOS had planned extensive coverage beginning Feb. 4.
February 11	Richard Callaghan becomes the first coach since 1950 to train the men's and ladies national champions when Todd Eldredge and Nicole Bobek win at the U.S. Figure Skating Championships. The Ladies' event airs live in prime time on ABC.
February 18	Renée Roca and Gorsha Sur defeat Elizabeth Punsalan and Jerod Swallow for the U.S. Ice Dance title. Punsalan and Swallow also admit in an exclusive ABC interview that, in '94, they lobbied Congress to not grant Sur, a native Russian, U.S. citizenship, so that they could represent the U.S. at the '94 Olympics.
February 18	Picabo Street wins her third, of what would be a U.S.-record five downhills in a row. By season's end she would become the first American ever to win the World Cup Downhill title.
February 25	Bonnie Blair wins her third World Sprint Speedskating championship in her final event on U.S. ice. Also, four-time Olympic gold medalist Johann Olav Koss makes his television commentating debut on ABC and interviews fellow Lillehammer gold medalist Dan Jansen.
March 4	World Freestyle Skiing Championships.
March 11	Florida Derby.
March 18	As Nadia Comăneci returns to Romania for the first time since her 1989 defection, WWOS details her brilliant career.
May 6	Kentucky Derby.
May 28	Indianapolis 500.
June 10	At the Belmont Stakes, D. Wayne Lukas becomes the first trainer in history to lead two different horses to all three Triple Crown titles in one season.
June 24	World Mountain Bike Champions.
July	Tour de France.
July 8	During an appearance at the Special Olympic World Games, Monica Seles announces she will return to pro tennis in a comeback after she was stabbed by a fan in 1993.
July 22	Mike Tyson retrospective: one month before his return to the ring.
July 29	The latest expansion franchises, Jacksonville Jaguars and Carolina Panthers compete in the 1995 AFC-NFC Hall of Fame Game during the preseason.
August 5	Brickyard 400
August 5, 6, 12 & 13	World Track and Field Championships.

=== 1996 ===
Day	Event
January 20	U.S. Figure Skating Championships.
February 27	European Figure Skating Championships.
February 17	Tatyana Lebedeva, a 22-year-old Russian skier, collides with Harold Shownower, a former U.S. Ski Team coach and FIS official, while training for the women's downhill at the World Alpine Skiing Championships in Sierra Nevada, Spain. Lebedeva catches air off a bump and when she comes back to the ground, Shownower had mistakenly skied onto the course and right into her path. Both suffered fractured legs and were airlifted off the mountain.
February 24 and March 2	Alberto Tomba, the three-time Olympic gold medalist from Italy, ends a decade of frustration at the World Alpine Skiing Championships by winning two gold medals.
March 2	Christine Witty becomes the women's champion at the 27th World Sprint Speed Skating Championships. Meanwhile, three-time and reigning World Sprint Champion Bonnie Blair makes her network commentating debut.
March 21 and 23	The World Figure Skating Championships live from Edmonton, Alberta, Canada. Three-time U.S. champion Todd Eldredge wins his first world championship, while the newest U.S. champion, Rudy Galindo, earns the bronze. On the afternoon of March 23, WWOS featured taped coverage of the ladies' short program and the unsuccessful comeback of former world champion Midori Ito to the amateur ranks. That evening, WWOS provided live coverage of Michelle Kwan's first world championship.
May 4	Kentucky Derby.
May 18	Preakness Stakes.
May 26	Indianapolis 500.
June 8	Belmont Stakes.
June 15	WWOS road racing analyst Marty Liquori jumps from the lead car of the Advil Mini-marathon to stop a spectator from harassing and running alongside eventual winner Tegla Loroupe. Liquori's linebacker move occurs less than a minute from the finish line in Central Park. Plus, former Soviet star Svetlana Boguinskaya, now competing for Belarus, makes her comeback to the international scene by placing second in the all-around at the European Women's Gymnastics Championships.
June 29, July 6 & 13	Tour de France.
August 3	Brickyard 400
September 23	The first U.S. women's gymnastics team to win the Olympic team gold medal—including WWOS stars Shannon Miller, Dominique Moceanu and Dominique Dawes—star in the Tour of Olympic Gymnastics Champions. The show airs in prime time and leads into Monday Night Football.

=== 1997 ===
Day	Event
January 11	National figure skating champion Rudy Galindo wins his first professional title at the Nutrasweet World Challenge of Champions in Innsbruck.
January 25 & February 1	European Figure Skating Championships.
February 1	The Winter "X Games" features snowboarding and mountain biking on snow in its Wide World debut. The Summer "X Games" premiere with skysurfing, street luge, and bike stunts on the June 21, 1997 Wide World from San Diego.
February 15 & 16	Fourteen-year-old Tara Lipinski becomes the youngest U.S. figure skating champion in history by upsetting the reigning national and world champion Michelle Kwan. Also in Nashville, World Champion Todd Eldredge wins his fourth national title.
March 20 & 22	World Figure Skating Championships. Fourteen-year-old Tara Lipinski becomes the youngest World figure skating champion in history by upsetting the reigning national and world champion Michelle Kwan.
April 19	Wide World airs network television's first women's professional boxing match. Former kickboxer Yvonne Trevino wins the WIBF Superflyweight championship live from Las Vegas in a first-round TKO over Brenda Rouse.
May 3	At the 123rd Kentucky Derby, Silver Charm beats Captain Bodgit by a head. Also, Bodgit jockey Alex Solis wears the Derby's first "jockeycam." The 19-ounce device was also used during Bodgit's Wood Memorial win on April 12, but rain/mud obscured the view.
May 17	Preakness Stakes.
May 25–27	Indianapolis 500.
June 7	Belmont Stakes.
August 23	Little League World Series.

== Sources ==
- Highlights
  - Wide World of Sports Highlights -- 1960s
  - Wide World of Sports Highlights -- 1970s
  - Wide World of Sports Highlights -- 1980s
  - Wide World of Sports Highlights -- 1990s
- Classic Wide World of Sports on TV.com
- Episode list for ABC's Wide World of Sports (1961)
- Wide World of Sports broadcasts
