= Mark Belling =

American conservative talk radio host

- Born: Mark Belling; July 4, 1956 (age 70); Kaukauna, Wisconsin
- Presenting career
- Show: The Mark Belling Late Afternoon Show
- Station: 1130 WISN (AM)
- Time slot: 3:00 PM - 6:00 PM CT
- Style: conservative talk radio
- Website: http://www.belling.com

Mark Belling (born July 4, 1956) is an American former conservative talk radio host for 1130 WISN in Milwaukee, Wisconsin. He is also a local newspaper columnist, former television host, and was a frequent guest host for Rush Limbaugh in the early 2000s. Belling retired from radio at the end of 2024 and has agreed to launch a semiweekly podcast on WISN parent company's iHeartRadio network in 2025.

A native of Wisconsin's Fox Valley, Belling is an alumnus of the University of Wisconsin–La Crosse.

== Radio ==
Belling has been with WISN and its various parent companies since March 1989. Before joining WISN he was news and program director of WTDY in Madison, Wisconsin, where he began his talk radio career. Belling also served as a radio news director in Springfield, Illinois; St. Joseph, Michigan; Benton Harbor, Michigan; and Oshkosh, Wisconsin.

From 1989 to 2024 Belling hosted a three-hour weekday radio program, The Mark Belling Late Afternoon Show. He discussed a wide variety of topics on his program, including sports, music, Milwaukee area politics, Wisconsin politics, and national issues. Being right wing politically, he has been known to frequently criticize local and national Republicans for straying from conservative principles. He has been criticized for his anti-Semitic statements and derogatory sexist language but remained popular among local conservative groups.

== Other media ==
In addition to his daily three-hour radio program, Belling was a guest-host for Rush Limbaugh's national radio program. When doing so, WISN usually broadcast this program twice rather than have someone fill in for Belling.

Belling writes a weekly op-ed column for the Waukesha Freeman. It usually covers local politics or scandals but occasionally remarks on national headlines and even sports.

Belling previously hosted a Sunday-morning television panel, Belling and Company, on WISN-TV (Channel 12) until 2000 when it moved to WDJT (Channel 58). The television program was discontinued in 2007, reportedly due to editorial conflicts between Belling and the management of WDJT owner Weigel Broadcasting.

== Awards ==
Belling is a 2001 Marconi award recipient for best medium-market radio personality. He chose not to attend the award ceremony. In 2001, Belling was named one of the Top 100 Heavy Talkers—the most influential radio talkers in America—by Talkers Magazine, an industry publication.

== Personal ==
Belling is involved with horse race ownership and has co-owned several over the years including 1997 Kentucky Derby entrant Captain Bodgit and 2012 Kentucky Derby entrant Went The Day Well.
