= Free House (horse) =

American-bred Thoroughbred racehorse

- Sire: Smokester
- Grandsire: Never Tabled
- Dam: Fountain Lake
- Damsire: Vigors
- Sex: Stallion
- Foaled: March 22, 1994
- Country: United States
- Colour: Gray
- Breeder: John Toffan & Trudy McCaffery
- Owner: John Toffan & Trudy McCaffery
- Trainer: J. Paco Gonzalez
- Record: 22: 9-5-3
- Earnings: $3,178,971

Major wins
- Norfolk Stakes (1996); San Felipe Stakes (1997); Santa Anita Derby (1997); Swaps Stakes (1997); Bel Air Handicap (1998); Pacific Classic Stakes (1998); Santa Anita Handicap (1999); San Antonio Handicap (1999) American Classic Race results: Kentucky Derby 3rd (1997) Preakness Stakes 2nd (1997) Belmont Stakes 3rd (1997)

Awards
- California Horse of the Year (1997, 1998)
- Last updated on June 17, 2007

Free House (March 22, 1994 – July 19, 2004) was an American Thoroughbred racehorse that Blood-Horse Publications called one of the best California-bred horses of all time.

== Background ==
Free House was a gray horse bred and raced by John Toffan & Trudy McCaffery. He was the best horse sired by Smokester who won two of his four races before being retired to stud.

== Racing career ==
In 1997 Free House was the dominant three-year-old in California racing, winning the San Felipe Stakes and the most important Grade I Santa Anita Derby, both times defeating Silver Charm.

In the Kentucky Derby, the first leg of the U.S. Triple Crown series, bettors sent Free House off as a more than 10:1 sixth choice behind favorites Captain Bodgit, the Florida Derby and Wood Memorial Stakes winner, and Silver Charm, the second choice. Free House started the Derby on the outside in post position thirteen. The gray colt raced at or near the lead until the final furlong when Silver Charm and Captain Bodgit caught him, and he finished third.

In the Preakness Stakes, Free House beat third-place finisher Captain Bodgit and fourth-place Touch Gold but in a head-to-head stretch drive finished second by less than a head to Silver Charm. In the Belmont Stakes, by the time the horses reached the top of the stretch, Silver Charm and Free House were once again racing head-to-head but Touch Gold came on to win, denying Silver Charm the Triple Crown with Free House finishing third.

After the Triple Crown series, Free House finished third to Touch Gold in the Haskell Invitational Handicap at Monmouth Park. On his return to racing in California, he won the 1997 Swaps Stakes over Deputy Commander. In 1998, as well as a victory in the Grade III Bel Air Handicap, Free House beat Gentlemen and Touch Gold to win the Grade I Pacific Classic Stakes. Back on the track as a five-year-old in 1999, he won the San Antonio Handicap, then later in the year scored the biggest win of his career in the Santa Anita Handicap, defeating archrival Silver Charm.

== Stud record ==
After his retirement from racing Free House stood at stud at Vessels Stallion Farm in Bonsall, California. On July 19, 2004, he was euthanized following an accident that fractured his skull. In his brief stallion career, he led California's first-crop list in 2003 by progeny earnings and notably sired multiple stakes winner House of Fortune.

== Pedigree ==
Pedigree of Free House (USA), gray stallion, 1994
Sire Smokester (USA) 1988	Never Tabled (USA); 1977	Never Bend	Nasrullah
Sire Smokester (USA) 1988	Never Tabled (USA); 1977	Never Bend	Lalun
Sire Smokester (USA) 1988	Never Tabled (USA); 1977	Table Flirt	Round Table
Sire Smokester (USA) 1988	Never Tabled (USA); 1977	Table Flirt	Gigi
Sire Smokester (USA) 1988	Small World (USA); 1982	Transworld	Prince John
Sire Smokester (USA) 1988	Small World (USA); 1982	Transworld	Hornpipe
Sire Smokester (USA) 1988	Small World (USA); 1982	Swoon Bread	Swoon's Son
Sire Smokester (USA) 1988	Small World (USA); 1982	Swoon Bread	Lawdy Claudy
Dam Fountain Lake (USA) 1988	Vigors (USA); 1973	Grey Dawn	Herbager
Dam Fountain Lake (USA) 1988	Vigors (USA); 1973	Grey Dawn	Polamia
Dam Fountain Lake (USA) 1988	Vigors (USA); 1973	Relifordie	El Relicario
Dam Fountain Lake (USA) 1988	Vigors (USA); 1973	Relifordie	Crafordie
Dam Fountain Lake (USA) 1988	Hotsie Totsie (USA); 1977	Icecapade	Nearctic
Dam Fountain Lake (USA) 1988	Hotsie Totsie (USA); 1977	Icecapade	Shenanigans
Dam Fountain Lake (USA) 1988	Hotsie Totsie (USA); 1977	Justaguest	Groton
Dam Fountain Lake (USA) 1988	Hotsie Totsie (USA); 1977	Justaguest	Guest Shot (Family 8-g)
