= Old Friends Equine =

Thoroughbred racehorse retirement facility

Coordinates: 38°10′45.7″N 84°35′45.8″W

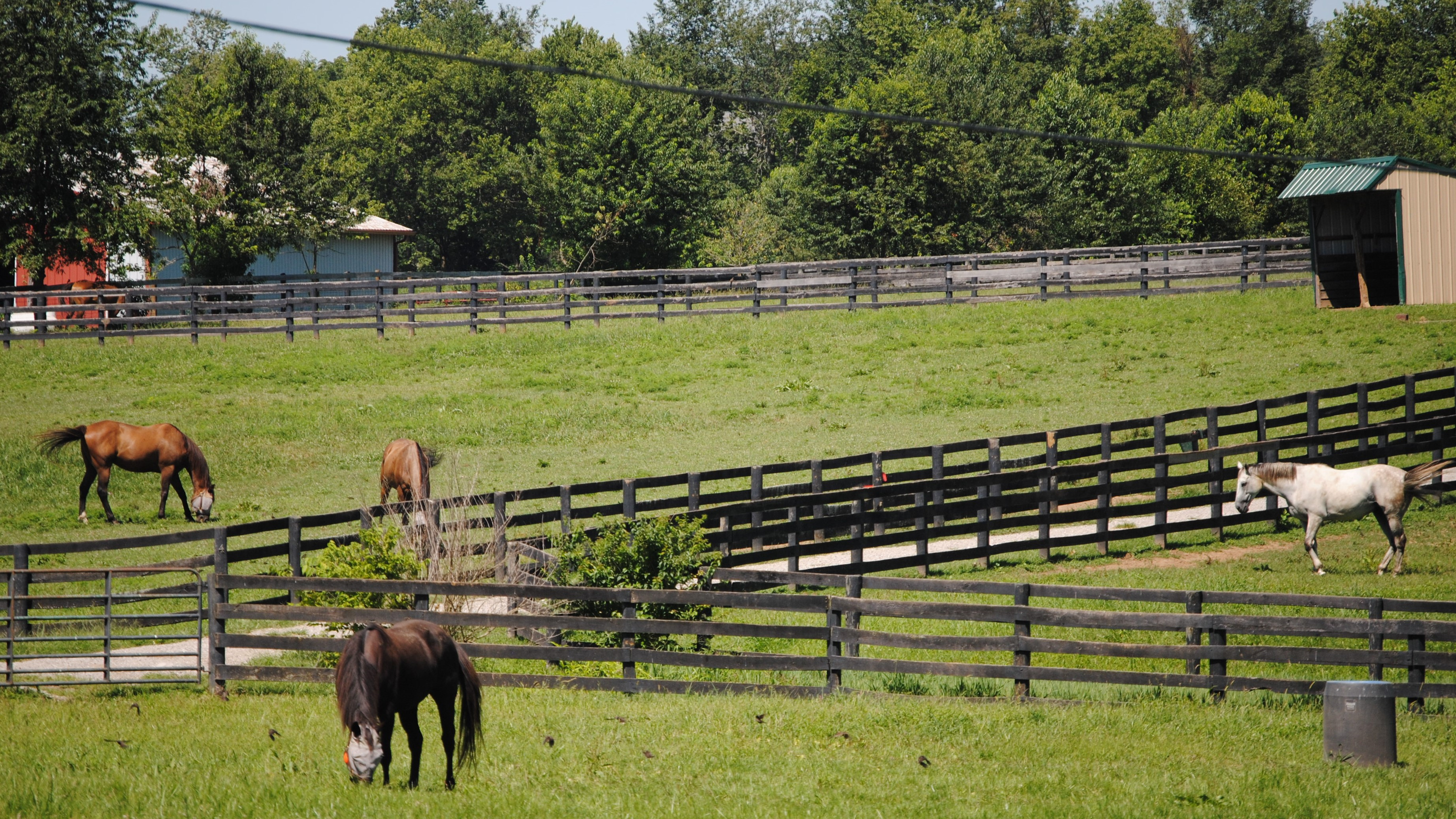
Horses at Old Friends Equine

Old Friends is a nonprofit 501(c)(3) equine retirement facility in Georgetown, Kentucky, accredited by the Thoroughbred Aftercare Alliance (TAA). The organization started with one leased paddock and two horses, but it now owns 136 acres, Dreamchase Farm, with additional leased pasturage. It is the only Thoroughbred retirement facility in the United States that accepts stallions on a regular basis. Old Friends is currently home to over 140 retired Thoroughbred athletes.

== Background ==
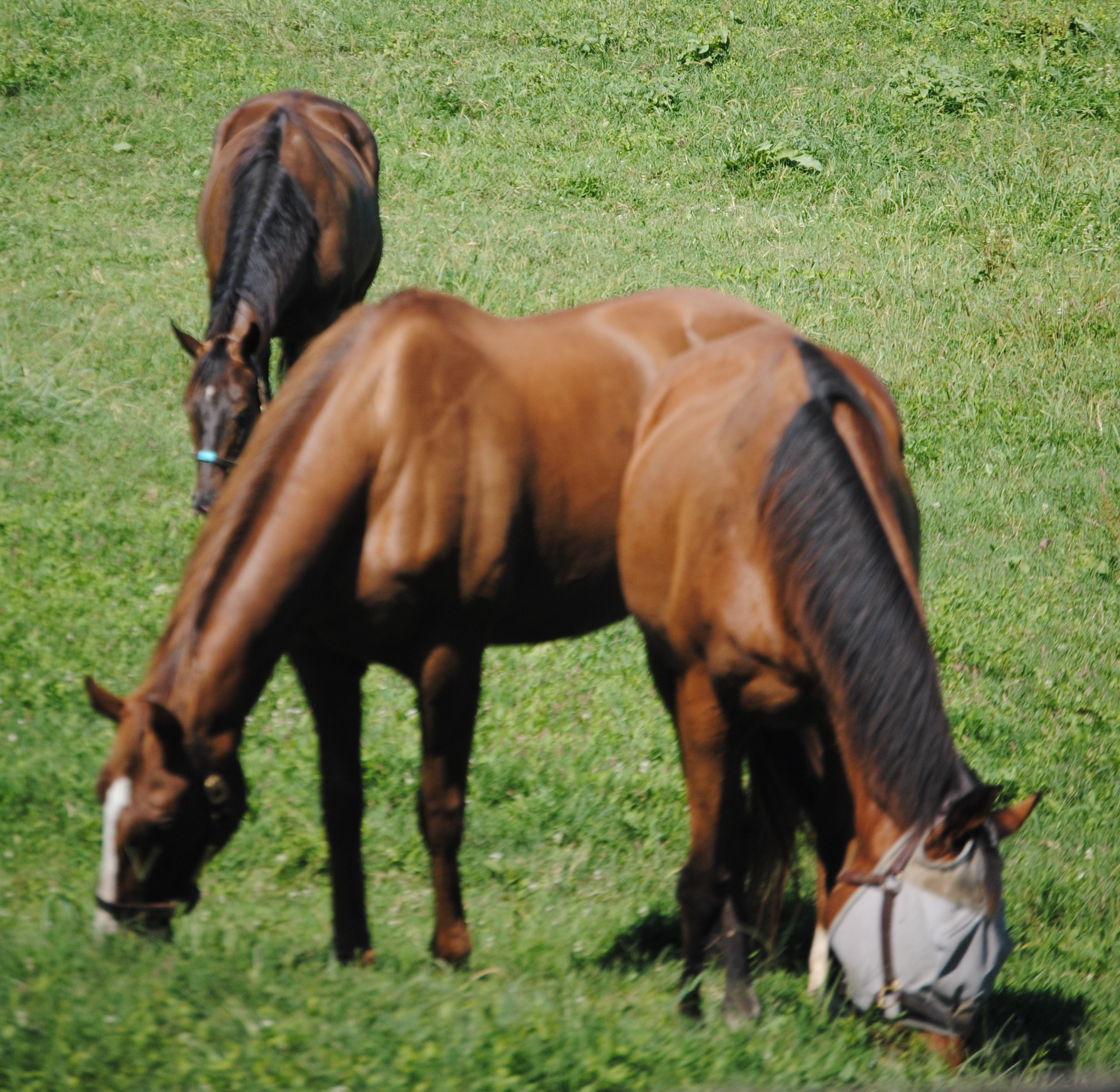
Geldings share pastures at Old Friends, bonding together

The facility was created in 2003 by former The Boston Globe movie critic Michael Blowen, spurred by the death of 1986 Kentucky Derby winner Ferdinand in 2002. The presence of high-profile horses helps raise money, allowing after-care for more low-profile horses.

In 2009, Joann and Mark Pepper's farm in Greenfield Center, New York, became a satellite operation of Old Friends Equine known as Old Friends at Cabin Creek: The Bobby Frankel Division, named for U.S. Racing Hall of Fame trainer Bobby Frankel, who died in 2009.

In 2015, Old Friends announced a partnership with Kentucky Downs, with the cooperation and assistance of Simpson County Tourism. Located on the Kentucky-Tennessee border, this satellite facility can house up to 10 retired Thoroughbreds and features daily tours and a gift shop. Residents currently include Canadian Horse of the Year Thornfield, Ball Four, Rumor Has It, Hussonfirst, Lusty Latin, and Sgt. Bert.

In January 2015, Old Friends was selected to receive a special Eclipse Award honoring extraordinary service or contributions to the Thoroughbred industry.

In January 2016, a fire destroyed the organization's hospital/quarantine barn. Fortunately, no horses or people were harmed. Plans are underway to rebuild a new fire-safe barn, aided by donations and fundraising activities.

Horses are kept "turned out" in their pasture as much as possible, with run-in sheds available in case of bad weather. Geldings typically share a paddock with one or two others, forming tight bonds. Stallions are more territorial and are thus kept in separate pastures. They do interact with each other though, often by racing down their fences. Visitors are allowed to touch and feed most of the retirees.

As of July 2026, the board of directors consists of John Nicholson (president and CEO), Robert Fulmer (chairman), Pat Riley (treasurer), Cynthia Grisolia (secretary), Jill Baffert, Susan Chu, Suzanne Mundy, Dr. Bryan Waldridge, Peggy Gdovka, Clark Nyberg, Mark Simon, Ron Wallace, Kerry Cauthen, Corey Johnsen, Bev Passerello, Robert Skinner, Diane White, and Michael Blowen. Besides being the founder, Blowen was also the president prior to stepping down at the end of 2023.

== Notable residents ==
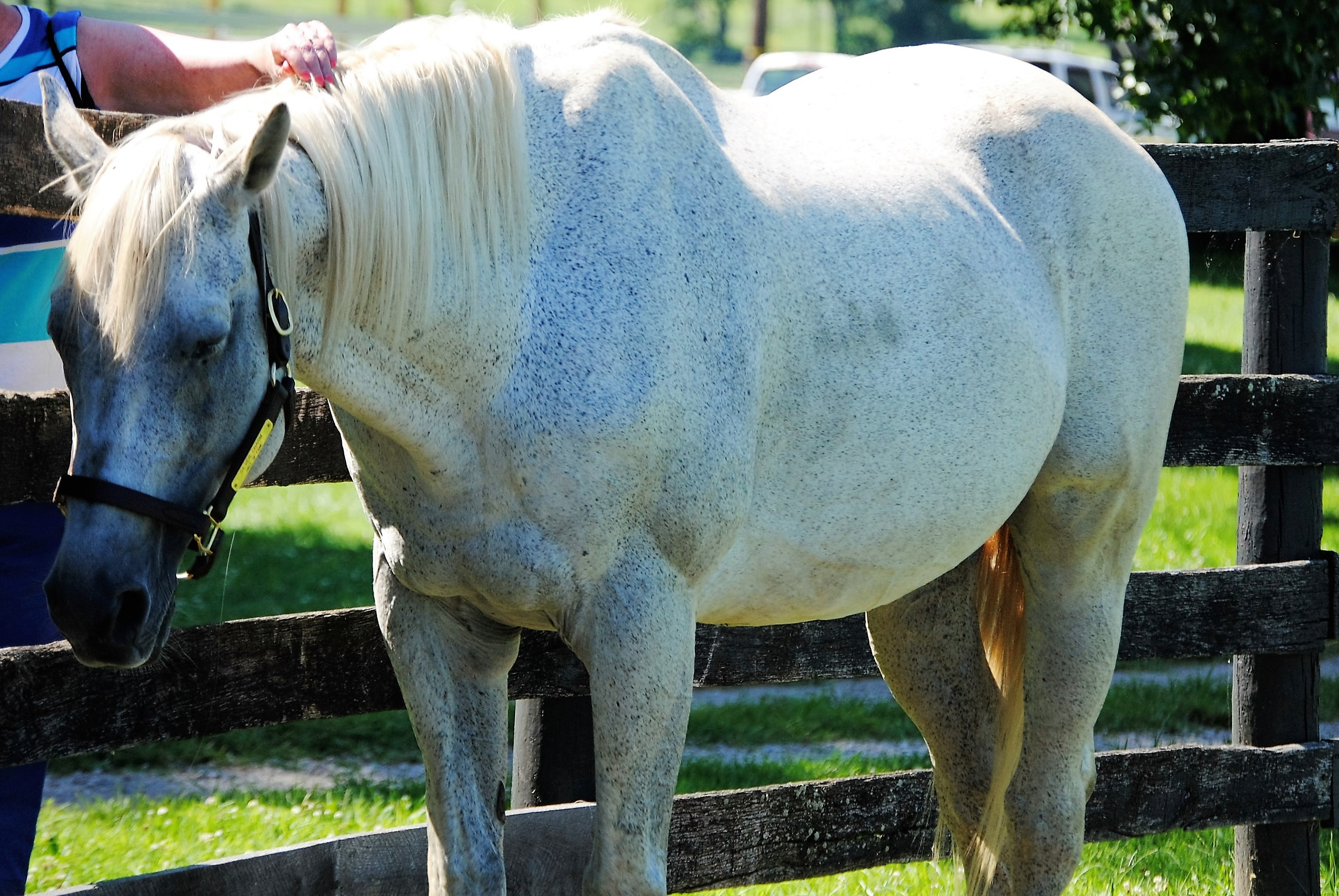
Silver Charm enjoying his retirement at Old Friends

Residents at the main farm in Kentucky range from Classic winners to claimers. They include:

- Big Brown (stallion, born 2005) – Winner of the 2008 Kentucky Derby and Preakness Stakes. Retired to Old Friends in 2024.
- Birdstone (stallion, born 2001) – Winner of the 2004 Belmont Stakes. Retired to Old Friends in 2020.
- Bird Town (mare, born 2000) – Winner of the 2003 Kentucky Oaks and Acorn Stakes. Retired to Old Friends in 2025.
- Game On Dude (gelding, born 2007) – The only three-time winner of the Santa Anita Handicap (2011, 2013, 2014) and winner of over $6 million. Retired to Old Friends in 2014.
- I'll Have Another (stallion, born 2009) – Winner of the 2012 Kentucky Derby and Preakness Stakes. Retired to Old Friends in 2024.
- Lava Man (gelding, born 2001) – Winner of the 2005, 2006, and 2007 Hollywood Gold Cup. Hall of Fame inductee. Retired to Old Friends in 2022.

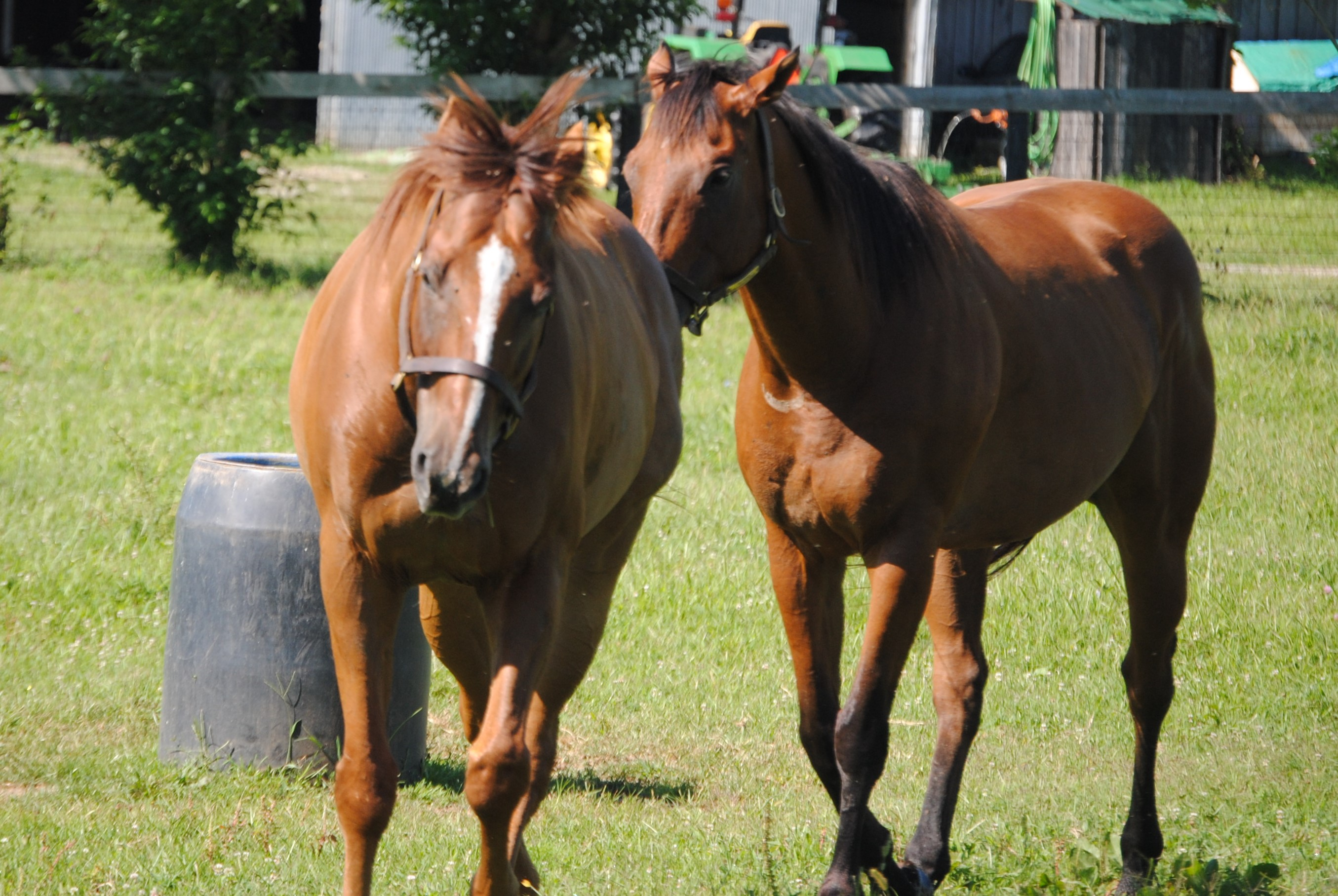
Rapid Redux with Rail Trip

- Little Mike (gelding, born 2007) – Winner of the 2012 Breeders' Cup Turf. Retired to Old Friends in 2016.
- Rail Trip (gelding, born 2005) – Winner of the 2009 Hollywood Gold Cup and over $1.5 million. Retired to Old Friends in 2014.
- Rapid Redux (gelding, born 2006) – Set a modern North American record by winning 22 consecutive races, winner of the Secretariat Vox Populi Award. Retired to Old Friends in 2012.
- Ruler on Ice (gelding, born 2008) – Winner of the 2011 Belmont Stakes. Retired to Old Friends in 2022.
- Silver Charm (stallion, born 1994) – Winner of the 1997 Kentucky Derby, Preakness Stakes and 1998 Dubai World Cup. Hall of Fame inductee. Retired to Old Friends in 2014 after standing in Japan.
- Stormy Liberal (gelding, born 2012) – Winner of the 2017 and 2018 Breeders' Cup Turf Sprint. Retired to Old Friends in 2019.
- Stone Legacy (mare, born 2006) – 2009 Kentucky Oaks runner-up. Retired to Old Friends in 2025.

=== Notable residents in New York ===
- King Congie (gelding, born 2008) – Stakes winner who contested the 2011 Preakness Stakes, he was rescued from an auction by Rosemary Farms, a horse rescue operation in 2016. He was returned to a previous owner, who then donated him to Old Friends in 2016.
- This Hard Land (gelding, born 2008) – Seven-time winner in 49 starts who was named after a song by Bruce Springsteen. Retired to Old Friends in 2016.

=== Notable residents at Kentucky Downs ===
- Ball Four (gelding, born 2001) – Winner of the 2006 Kentucky Cup Classic, set two track records. Retired to Old Friends in 2011.
- Good Lord (gelding, born 2007) – 9-time stakes winner with over 80 starts, earnings of $803,305. Retired to Old Friends in 2016.
- Sgt. Bert (gelding, born 2001) – Two time winner of the Woodford Stakes (2005, 2006), setting a track record. Retired to Old Friends in 2009.

== Deceased Old Friends ==
Former residents of Old Friends include:

- Affirmed Success (gelding, born 1994) – Winner of 1998 Forego Handicap and Vosburgh Stakes, 1999 Cigar Mile Handicap, 2002 Carter Handicap, retired to Old Friends in 2007 after a stint at the Kentucky Horse Park. Euthanized in 2022 due to chronic hoof infections.
- Amazombie (gelding, born 2006) – Winner of 2011 Breeders' Cup Sprint, Eclipse Award for Champion Sprinter. Euthanized in 2023 due to a fractured ankle.
- Awad (stallion, born 1990) – Winner of 1993 Secretariat Stakes and 1995 Arlington Million. Died in 2011.
- Alphabet Soup (stallion, born 2001) – Winner of the 1996 Breeders' Cup Classic. Retired to Old Friends in 2015 after standing at Adena Springs. Euthanized in 2022 due to chronic kidney disease.
- A. P. Slew (gelding, born 1999) – Great-great-grandson of Hall of Fame filly Silver Spoon. Euthanized in 2014 due to complications from colic surgery.
- Appygolucky (gelding, born 1997) – King of the Claimers at Beulah Park, holds track record for a mile at the now-defunct Ohio racetrack. Euthanized in 2009 due to spinal condition.
- Ballindaggin (stallion, born 1985) – Winner of 1988 Molson Export Challenge. Euthanized on July 22, 2008.
- Black Tie Affair (stallion, born 1986) – Winner of 1991 Breeders' Cup Classic and Horse of the Year. Euthanized in 2010 due to laminitis.
- Bonnie's Poker (mare, born 1982) – Dam of Hall of Fame Kentucky Derby and Preakness winner, Silver Charm. Died at age 28 in 2010.
- Bonapaw (gelding, born 1996) – Millionaire winner of the 2002 Vosburgh Stakes that made over 40 starts. Was euthanized in 2017 due to complications caused by neurological disease.
- Bull Inthe Heather (stallion, born 1990) – Winner of 1993 Florida Derby, a son of Ferdinand. Euthanized in 2014 due to ongoing physical infirmities.
- Catlaunch (gelding, born 2001) – Started over 100 times, earning over $1 million at smaller tracks in Ohio and the midwest. Euthanized in May 2018 due to chronic neurologic disease.
- Charismatic (stallion, born 1996) – Winner of 1999 Lexington Stakes, Kentucky Derby and Preakness Stakes. Died at age 21 in 2017 after a freak stall accident, shortly after arriving at Old Friends from Japan, where he had been standing stallion duties.
- Creator (stallion, born 1986) – Winner of 1990 Prix Ganay. In 2004, he was one of the first stallions (with Ogygian and Sunshine Forever) returned by Old Friends from overseas for retirement. Euthanized on February 28, 2015, after complications from colic.
- Commentator (gelding, born 2001) – Two time Whitney Handicap winner and New York Horse of the Year (2007, 2008). Euthanized in June 2025 due to complications from Potomac horse fever.
- Crusader Sword (stallion, born 1985) – Winner of 1997 Hopeful Stakes and Saratoga Special Stakes. A leading sire in New York, he sired 16 stakes winners and over $17.8 million in progeny earnings. He died in May 2010 due to infirmities of old age.

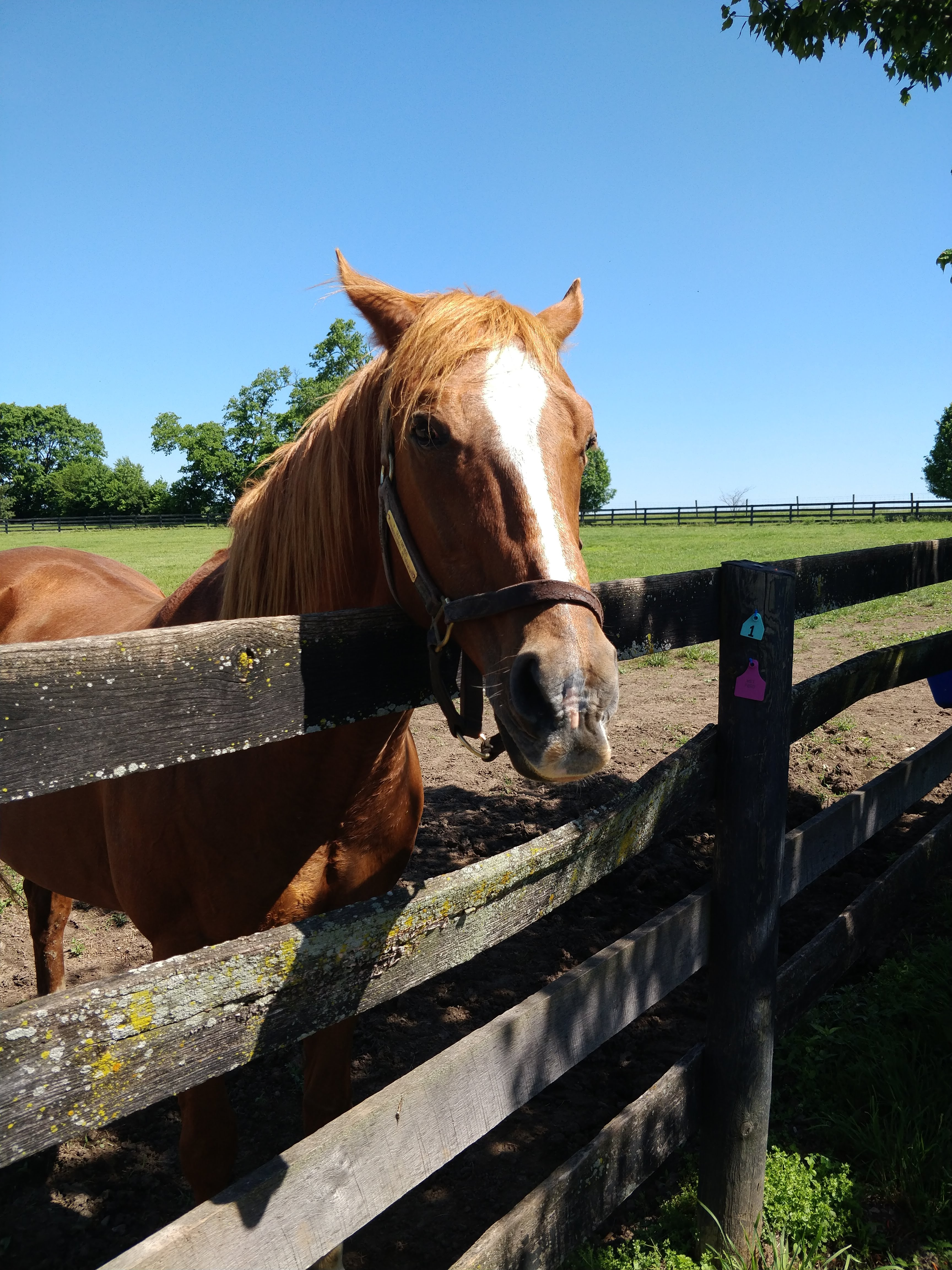
Genuine Reward at age 25

Charismatic's grave at Old Friends

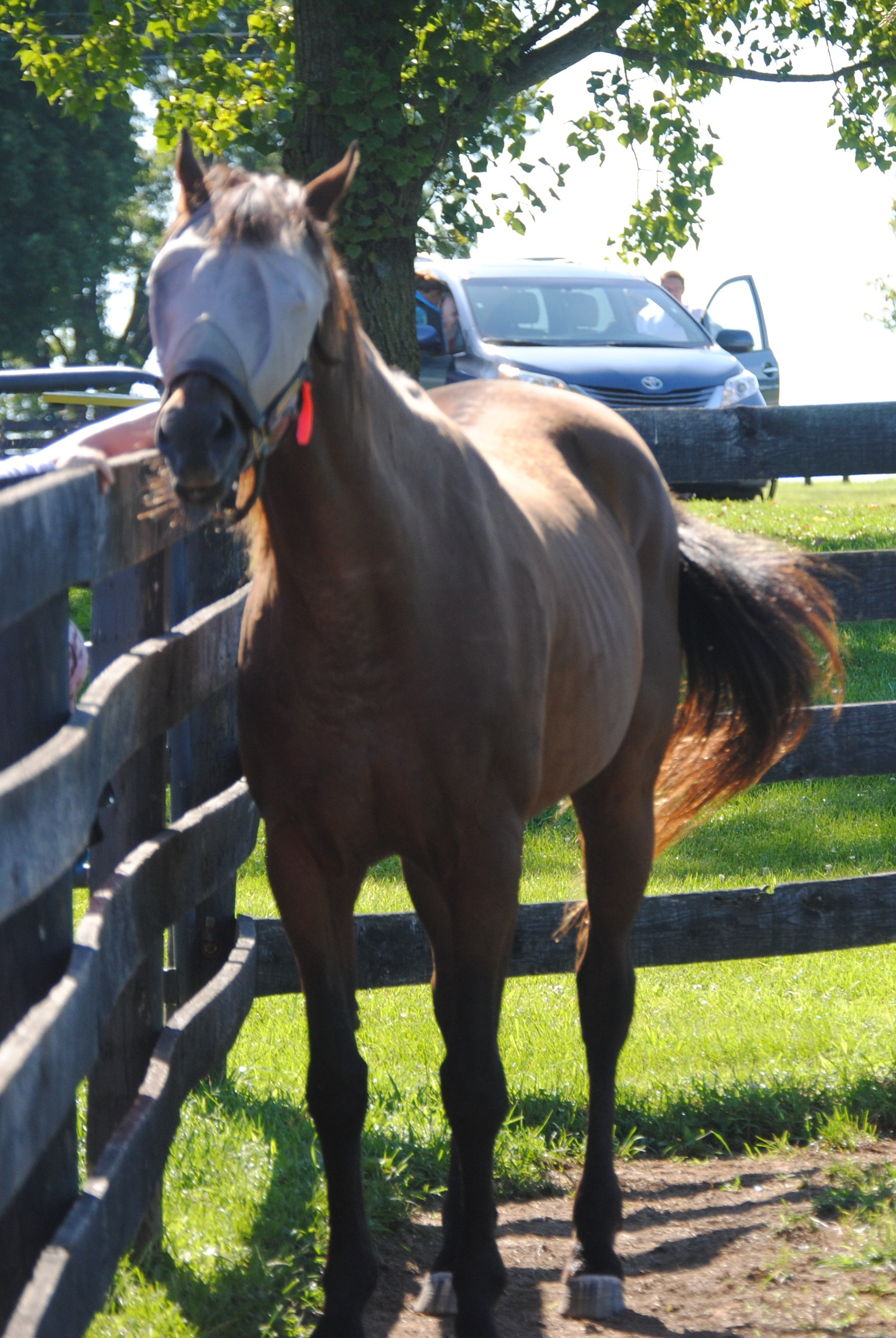
Gulch at age 31

- Diamond Stripes (gelding, born 2003) – Winner of the 2008 Godolpin Mile at Meydan and two other graded stakes. Euthanized at age 14 due to complications from sinus cancer.
- Eldaafer (gelding, born 2005) – Winner of 2010 Breeders' Cup Marathon. Retired to Old Friends in 2014 with his goats, Yahoo and Google. Died in 2026.
- Fortunate Prospect (stallion, born 1991) – Winner of 1984 San Vincente Stakes, sire of 537 winners. Died at age 31 in 2012.
- Genuine Reward (stallion, born 1993) – One of only two living foals produced by Kentucky Derby winning filly Genuine Risk, he never raced. He was serving as a sire of polo ponies before being relocated to Old Friends in 2015. Euthanized in 2018.
- Gulch (stallion, born 1984) – Eclipse Champion / Breeders' Cup-winning sprinter and sire of Kentucky Derby winner Thunder Gulch. Died at age 32 on January 17, 2016.
- Halo America (mare, born 1990) – Multiple graded stakes winning mare, dam of stakes winners Quick Temper and Marino Marini, and granddam of 2017 Preakness Stakes winner Cloud Computing. Euthanized at age 26 due to declining health.
- Hidden Lake (mare, born 1993) – 1997 Eclipse Champion Older Mare, retired to Old Friends in 2009. Euthanized September 29, 2016 due to the infirmities of old age.
- I'm Charismatic (gelding, born 2001) – Son of Kentucky Derby and Preakness winner Charismatic, he raced 92 times with limited success, dropping to the lowest claiming ranks. Purchased in 2012 for retirement to Old Friends. Died in 2018 due to chronic arthritis.
- Kiri's Clown (stallion, born 1989) – Winner of 1995 Sword Dancer Invitational, track record holder for 1 1/2 miles at Saratoga. Retired from stud in 2006, died in 2014 due to complications from colic surgery.
- Key Contender (stallion, born 1988) – Winner of 1995 Suburban Handicap with over 50 starts. Sired stakes winner Weathered. Died in July 2012 due to colic.
- Little Silver Charm (?) – Miniature horse and Old Friends' official "spokeshorse". One of the few non-Thoroughbred horses at Dream Chase Farm. "Author" of A Charmed Life as told to Diane White, published in 2016, the story of life at Old Friends.
- Ogygian (stallion, born 1983) – Winner of 1985 Belmont Futurity, 1986 Riva Ridge Stakes, 1986 Dwyer Stakes and 1986 Jerome Handicap. Ogygian was euthanized at the age of 32 due to colic complications. At the time of his death, he was the oldest resident at Old Friends.
- Popcorn Deelites (gelding, born 1998) – Low level claimer turned animal actor, performed the title role in the 2003 film Seabiscuit, joined Old Friends in 2005 and died in 2022.
- Precisionist (stallion, born 1981) – Winner 1985 Breeders' Cup Sprint, Eclipse Award for Champion Sprinter, Hall of Fame inductee. Euthanized in 2006 due to cancerous tumors.
- Prized (stallion, born 1986) – Winner of 1989 Breeders' Cup Turf in his first start on a grass course. Died in 2014 at age 28.
- Sarava (stallion, born 1999) – Winner of 2002 Belmont Stakes in the biggest upset in the race's history. Retired from stud in 2012.
- Special Ring (gelding, born 1997) – Winner of 2003 and 2004 Grade 1 Eddie Read Handicap, joined Old Friends in 2005. Died in 2025 after complications from colic.
- Sun King (stallion, born 2002) – Multiple graded stakes winning son of Charismatic, joined Old Friends in 2017 after being pensioned from stallion duty, shortly after his sire's passing. Euthanized in 2023 due to inoperable cancer.
- Sunshine Forever (stallion, born 1985) – Winner of 1988 Budweiser International, Turf Classic, and Man o' War Stakes, Champion Turf Horse. Died January 7, 2014.
- Ruhlmann (stallion, born 1985) – Winner of 1990 Santa Anita Handicap. Died December 24, 2008.
- The Wicked North (stallion, born 1989) – Won three Grade 1 races, 1994 Eclipse Award winner for Champion Older Horse. Euthanized March 2011.
- Thornfield (gelding, born 1994) – Winner of the 1999 Canadian International, 1999 Canadian Horse of the Year. Died in 2023 due to a paddock accident.
- Thunder Rumble (stallion, born 1989) – The first New York-bred horse in 125 years to win the Travers Stakes. Died of complications from colic in January 2015 at age 26.
- Tinners Way (stallion, born 1990) – Two time winner of the Pacific Classic, Secretariat's last born son. Euthanized at age 27 after battling a severe neurological disease.
- Touch Gold (stallion, born 1994) – Winner of the 1997 Belmont Stakes, in which he ended Silver Charm's bid for the U.S. Triple Crown. Retired to Old Friends in 2015 after standing at Adena Springs. Euthanized on November 13, 2025, at Rood & Riddle Equine Hospital in Kentucky at the age of 31, after developing a chronic condition in the months leading up to his passing.
- Tour of the Cat (gelding, born 1998) – Won multiple graded stakes and over $1.1 million, before descending through the claiming ranks. Claimed in 2009 in order to retire to Old Friends. Died in May 2018 due to a diaphragmatic hernia.
- Wallenda (stallion, born 1990) – Winner of 1993 Grade 1 Super Derby and a son of Gulch. Euthanized in 2016 after a lifelong battle with chronic pain caused by a bad hoof.
- War Emblem (stallion until 2015, gelding thereafter, born 1999) – Winner of the 2002 Kentucky Derby and Preakness. Stood in Japan where he was a notoriously shy breeder. Brought back to Old Friends in 2015 where it proved necessary to geld him to comply with USDA regulations. Died in March 2020 at age 21.
- Williamstown (stallion, born 1990) – Former mile record holder at Belmont. He was euthanized February 25, 2015 due to complications from equine protozoal myeloencephalitis.
- Will's Way (stallion, born 1993) – Winner of 1996 Travers Stakes.
- Winning Dubai (gelding, born 2009) – A Puerto Rican runner who was retired and sent stateside after Hurricane Maria, along with several other horses. The son of E Dubai made over 90 starts, winning 22 times and earning over $105,984. Died in 2021.
- Winston (gelding, born 1993) – miniature horse, former resident Thoroughbred companion at the Kentucky Derby Museum. Retired to Old Friends and died on May 2, 2018, just before his 25th birthday, due to an abdominal infection.
- Zippy Chippy (gelding, born 1991) – modern American record holder for the most losses—"racing's most lovable loser"

The following horses were re-interred at Old Friends when their original graves were threatened:

- Glacial Princess (mare, born 1981) – Two-time Ohio Horse of the Year (1985, 1986) who broke down during the 1987 Ballerina Stakes; re-interred after resting place Beulah Park was scheduled for development. The Glacial Princess Stakes is run at Mahoning Valley in her honor.
- Noor (stallion, born 1945) – Hall of Fame Champion re-interred from the former Loma Rica Ranch after planned development due to an effort headed by Charlotte Farmer.
- Skip Away (stallion, born 1993) – Hall of Fame Champion, 1998 Horse of the Year was re-interred from the former burial place at Hopewell Farm. The farm was sold at auction.
- Springsteel (gelding) – "Iron Horse" gelding with a race record of 76: 20-15-9 and earnings of $39,340, five time stakes winner and track record setter, euthanized after breaking down after a race at Rockingham Park, where he was buried. After the defunct racetrack was set for development, noted photographer Barbara Livingston and Michael Blowen arranged for the transfer of his headstone.

== Old Friends Stakes at Kentucky Downs ==
In 2015, Kentucky Downs introduced the Old Friends Stakes. A black-type turf stakes run in September, the race is held on the "Old Friends Day" race card, a day dedicated to the facility and thoroughbred aftercare. Along with their share of the $150,000 purse, the winner is guaranteed a place at Old Friends upon retirement.

The inaugural running in 2015 was won by 50–1 shot Kalamos, a son of Empire Maker who had previously won a Gr.III race in Europe.

The second running in 2016 was won by Flatlined, a son of Flatter who would go on to become a graded stakes winner.

The third running in 2017 was won by Sir Dudley Digges, a son of Gio Ponti who most notably took the 2016 Queen's Plate in an upset. The win was his first since the Queen's Plate.

== See also ==
- List of racehorses
