= 1997 Preakness Stakes =

122nd running of the Preakness Stakes

122nd Preakness Stakes
- The Preakness Stakes
- "The Middle Jewel of the Triple Crown" "The Run for the Black-Eyed Susans"
- Location: Pimlico Race Course, Baltimore, Maryland, United States
- Date: May 17, 1997
- Winning horse: Silver Charm
- Jockey: Gary Stevens
- Trainer: Bob Baffert
- Conditions: Fast
- Surface: Dirt

The 1997 Preakness Stakes was the 122nd running of the Preakness Stakes thoroughbred horse race. The race took place on May 17, 1997, and was televised in the United States on the ABC television network. Silver Charm, who was jockeyed by Gary Stevens, won the race by a head over both runner-up Free House and Captain Bodgit. Approximate post time was 5:29 p.m. Eastern Time. The race was run over a fast track in a final time of 1:54-4/5. The Maryland Jockey Club reported total attendance of 102,118, this is recorded as second highest on the list of American thoroughbred racing top attended events for North America in 1997.

== Payout ==
The 122nd Preakness Stakes Payout Schedule

Program Number	Horse Name	Win	Place	Show
6	Silver Charm	$8.20	$4.00	$2.60
3	Free House	-	$3.60	$2.60
8	Captain Bodgit	-	-	$2.40

$2 Exacta: (6–3) paid $22.40

$2 Trifecta: (6–3–8) paid $38.20

== The full chart ==
Finish Position	Margin (lengths)	Post Position	Horse name	Jockey	Trainer	Owner	Post Time Odds	Purse Earnings
1st	0	6	Silver Charm	Gary Stevens	Bob Baffert	Robert B. Lewis	3.10-1	$650,000
2nd	Head	4	Free House	Kent Desormeaux	J. Paco Gonzalez	Trudy McCaffery	2.40-1	$200,000
3rd	Head	9	Captain Bodgit	Alex Solis	Gary Capuano	Team Valor	2.10-1 favorite	$100,000
4th	1 1/2	5	Touch Gold	Chris McCarron	David Hofmans	Stonerside Stable	4.60-1	$50,000
5th	7 3/4	8	Frisk Me Now	Edwin L. King, Jr.	Robert J. Durso	Carol R. Dender	29.60-1	
6th	9	7	Concerto	Mike E. Smith	John J. Tammaro III	Kinsman Stable	9.00-1	
7th	20	3	Hoxie	José A. Santos	Alfredo Callejas	Robert Perez	68.10-1	
8th	22 3/4	2	Wild Tempest	Joe Bravo	Nicholas P. Zito	William J. Condren	61.30-1	
9th	36 3/4	10	Cryp Too	C. C. Lopez	Allen Borosh	Lauri Hegarty	54.30-1	
10th	37	1	Jack At the Bank	Herb McCauley	Alfredo Callejas	Robert Perez	68.10-1	

- Winning Breeder: Mary L. Wootton; (FL)
- Final Time: 1:54 4/5
- Track Condition: Fast
- Total Attendance: 102,118

== See also ==
- 1997 Kentucky Derby
