= 1997 Belmont Stakes =

American horse race

129th Belmont Stakes
- Belmont Stakes
- Grade I stakes race
- Location: Belmont Park; Elmont, New York, U.S.
- Date: June 7, 1997
- Winning horse: Touch Gold
- Winning time: 2:28.82
- Final odds: 2.65 (to 1)
- Jockey: Chris McCarron
- Trainer: Patrick B. Byrne
- Owner: Stronach Stables and Stonerside Stable
- Conditions: Fast
- Surface: Dirt
- Attendance: 20,000

The 1997 Belmont Stakes was the 129th running of the Belmont Stakes at Belmont Park in Elmont, New York held on June 7, 1997. With a field of seven horses, Touch Gold won by a quarter of a length in front of a crowd of 20,000 spectators. Silver Charm, winner of the Kentucky Derby and Preakness Stakes, had a chance to win the Triple Crown of Thoroughbred Racing by winning this race, but was unsuccessful.

== Results ==
Finish	Post Position	Program Number	Horse	Jockey	Owner	Trainer	Final Odds (to 1)	Stakes
1	1	1	Touch Gold	Chris McCarron	Stronach Stables and Stonerside Stable	Patrick B. Byrne	2	$432,600
2	2	2	Silver Charm	Gary Stevens	Robert B. Lewis and Beverly J. Lewis	Bob Baffert	1	$144,200
3	6	5	Free House	Kent Desormeaux	Trudy McCaffery and John A. Toffan	J. Paco Gonzalez	4	$79,310
4	3	3	Crypto Star	Pat Day	Darryl and Evelyn Yates	Larry A. Kelly	4	$43,260
5	7	6	Irish Silence	John Velazquez	Jami C. Poole	Jami C. Poole	34	$21,630
6	4	1a	Wild Rush	Jerry Bailey	Stronach Stables	Patrick B. Byrne	2	
7	5	4	Mr. Energizer	Manuel Ortega	Ezequiel M. Rolon	Dale T. Clark	45	

Times: 1/4 mile: :23.74, 1/2 mile: :49.22, 3/4mile: 1:13.81, 1 mile: 1:38.80, Final: 2:28.82

=== Payout schedule ===
Program	Horse	Win	Place	Show
1	Touch Gold	$7.30	$3.30	$2.60
2	Silver Charm	–	$3.00	$2.40
5	Free House	–	–	$2.70

== See also ==
- 1997 Kentucky Derby
- 1997 Preakness Stakes
