= 1997 Cheltenham Gold Cup =

1997 horse race

The 1997 Cheltenham Gold Cup was a horse race which took place at Cheltenham on Thursday 13 March 1997. It was the 70th running of the Cheltenham Gold Cup, and it was won by Mr Mulligan. The winner was ridden by Tony McCoy and trained by Noel Chance. The pre-race favourite Imperial Call pulled-up before fence 18.

McCoy's victory completed a big-race double, as he had also ridden the winner of the Champion Hurdle two days earlier.

== Race details ==
- Sponsor: Tote
- Winner's prize money: £134,810.00
- Going: Good
- Number of runners: 14
- Winner's time: 6m 35.5s

== Full result ==
	*	Horse	Age	Jockey	Trainer ^{†}	SP
1		Mr Mulligan	9	Tony McCoy	Noel Chance	20/1
2	9	Barton Bank	11	David Walsh	David Nicholson	33/1
3	½	Dorans Pride	8	Shane Broderick	Michael Hourigan (IRE)	10/1
4	6	Go Ballistic	8	Tony Dobbin	John O'Shea	50/1
5	3	Challenger du Luc	7	Chris Maude	Martin Pipe	16/1
6	16	One Man	9	Richard Dunwoody	Gordon W. Richards	7/1
7	16	Coome Hill	8	Jamie Osborne	Walter Dennis	15/2
8	7	Cyborgo	7	Charlie Swan	Martin Pipe	12/1
PU	Fence 21	Banjo	7	David Bridgwater	David Nicholson	33/1
Fell	Fence 21	Danoli	9	Tommy Treacy	Tom Foley (IRE)	7/1
PU	Fence 21	Dublin Flyer	11	Brendan Powell	Tim Forster	8/1
PU	Fence 21	Nathen Lad	8	Rodney Farrant	Jenny Pitman	20/1
PU	Fence 18	Imperial Call	8	Conor O'Dwyer	Fergie Sutherland (IRE)	4/1 fav
Fell	Fence 13	Unguided Missile	9	Norman Williamson	Gordon W. Richards	16/1

* The distances between the horses are shown in lengths or shorter. PU = pulled-up.
† Trainers are based in Great Britain unless indicated.

== Winner's details ==
Further details of the winner, Mr Mulligan:

- Foaled: 25 April 1988 in Ireland
- Sire: Torus; Dam: Miss Manhattan (Bally Joy)
- Owner: Michael and Geraldine Worcester
- Breeder: James Rowley
