= Touch Gold =

American-bred Thoroughbred racehorse

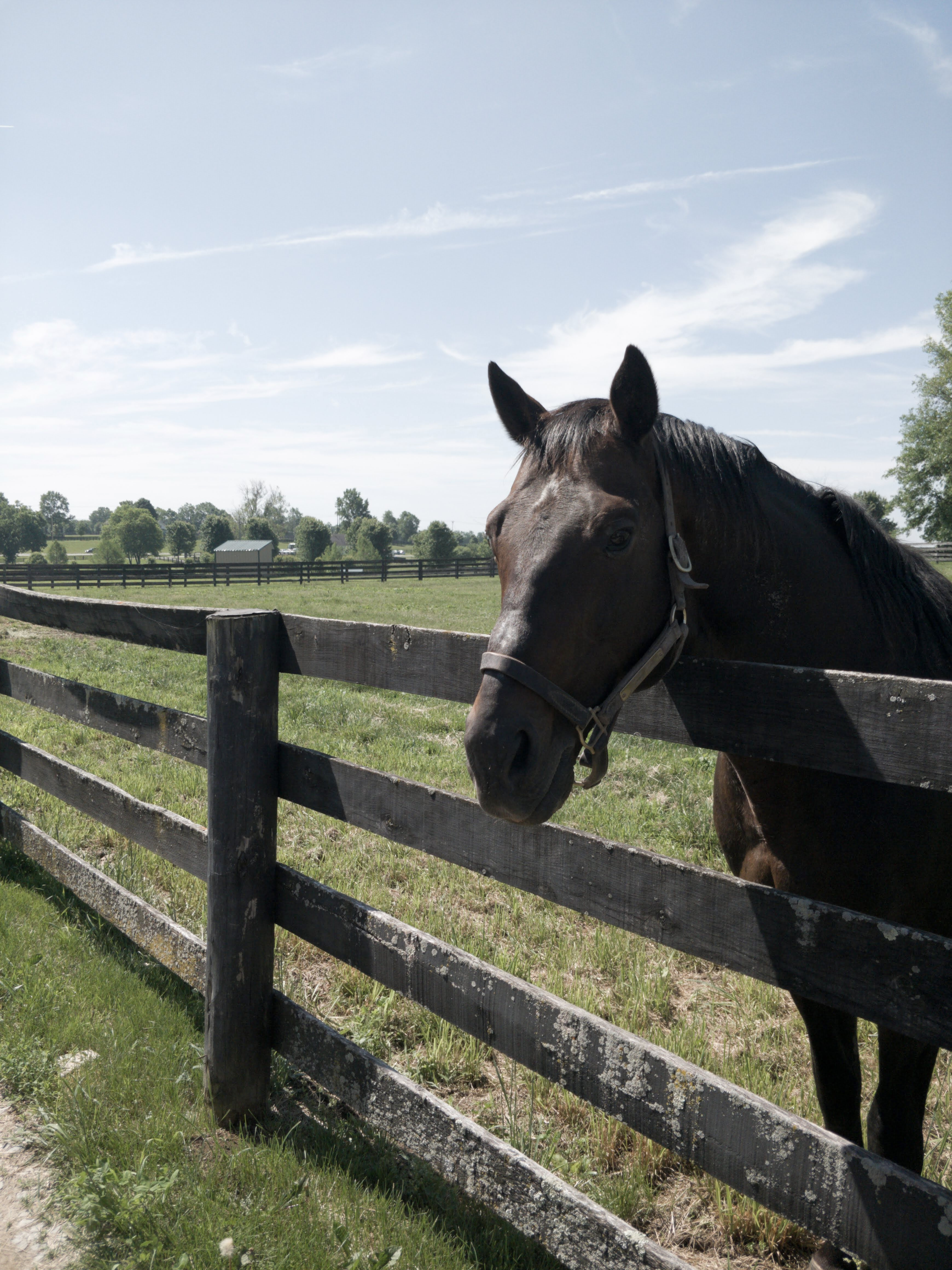
- Touch Gold at Old Friends in 2018
- Sire: Deputy Minister
- Grandsire: Vice Regent
- Dam: Passing Mood
- Damsire: Buckpasser
- Sex: Stallion
- Foaled: May 26, 1994
- Died: November 13, 2025 (aged 31)
- Country: United States
- Colour: Bay
- Breeder: Holtsinger Inc., Hill 'n' Dale Farms, Star Stable
- Owner: Stonerside Stable & Frank Stronach
- Trainer: Daniel J. Vella; David Hofmans (at age 3)
- Record: 15: 6-3-1
- Earnings: $1,179,907

Major wins
- Lexington Stakes (1997); Haskell Invitational Handicap (1997) Triple Crown race wins: Belmont Stakes (1997)

Touch Gold (May 26, 1994 – November 13, 2025) was an American Thoroughbred racehorse best known as the winner of the Belmont Stakes, in which he ended Silver Charm's bid for the U.S. Triple Crown.

== Background ==
Sired by Canadian Horse Racing Hall of Fame inductee Deputy Minister, Touch Gold was out of the mare Passing Mood, a daughter of U.S. Racing Hall of Fame inductee Buckpasser. A late foal born at the end of May, he was purchased by Frank Stronach for $375,000 at the July 1995 Keeneland select yearling sale. He was sent into training with Daniel J. Vella at Woodbine Racetrack in Toronto, Ontario, Canada.

== Racing career ==
=== 1996: two-year-old season ===
After Touch Gold won a 6-furlong maiden race, his best 1996 stakes results were a third in the Grey Stakes and a second in the Swynford Stakes.

=== 1997: three-year-old season ===
==== Early season ====
Sent to race in the United States under new trainer David Hofmans, Touch Gold won a 6-furlong allowance race at Santa Anita Park, then at Keeneland Race Course won April's Lexington Stakes, in which he defeated top three-year-old Smoke Glacken by 8½ lengths.

Not entered in the Kentucky Derby, Touch Gold competed in the second leg of the U.S. Triple Crown series, the Preakness Stakes. At the start of the race, the colt stumbled but rallied to challenge the leaders until he tired in the homestretch to finish fourth behind Silver Charm. He came out of the Preakness with a sore left front hoof but recovered enough to enter the Belmont Stakes three weeks later.

==== 1997 Belmont Stakes ====
Going into the 1997 Belmont Stakes, Silver Charm was favored to become the first Triple Crown winner since Affirmed in 1978. His main opposition was expected to come from the entry of Touch Gold and Wild Rush, stretch-running Crypto Star, and Free House who had finished third in the Derby and second in the Preakness. In the Belmont, Touch Gold held a slim lead early but relinquished it at the halfway mark. Coming into the top of the stretch, he was fourth, blocked behind a wall of horses running three-wide. Jockey Chris McCarron swung Touch Gold to the far outside, where he rallied to win over Silver Charm by three-quarters of a length.

==== After Belmont ====
After his 1997 Belmont Stakes win, Touch Gold was sent to rest in California in order to allow his sore hoof time to heal. He eventually returned to win that year's Grade I Haskell Invitational Handicap at Monmouth Park but in the fall's Breeders' Cup Classic, he finished ninth and last. At age four in 1998, he raced four times, only going back to the track at the end of June when he won a one-mile allowance race at Churchill Downs in a time of 1:34, one fifth of a second off the track record. His next best result came in October when he finished second in the Fayette Stakes. In the Breeders' Cup Classic, he finished eighth in a ten-horse field.

== Stud career ==
Owned by a syndicate that includes Frank Stronach, Touch Gold stood at stud at Adena Springs in Midway, Kentucky. He sired four Grade I winners in his first two crops. In 2006, his son Royal Challenger won the Breeders' Stakes, the third leg of the Canadian Triple Crown, and Seek Gold won the Grade I Stephen Foster Handicap.

Touch Gold was pensioned from stud duty in 2015 and was sent to Old Friends Equine in Kentucky, where he resided along with his son, Seek Gold.

== Death ==
Touch Gold died on November 13, 2025, at Rood & Riddle Equine Hospital in Kentucky at the age of 31, after developing a chronic condition in the months leading up to his death. Old Friends founder Michael Blowen said he was glad that Touch Gold was at Rood & Riddle where they could give him a "peaceful goodbye." He added: "I've never been around a tougher living thing in my life than that horse."
