= Silver Charm =

American-bred Thoroughbred racehorse

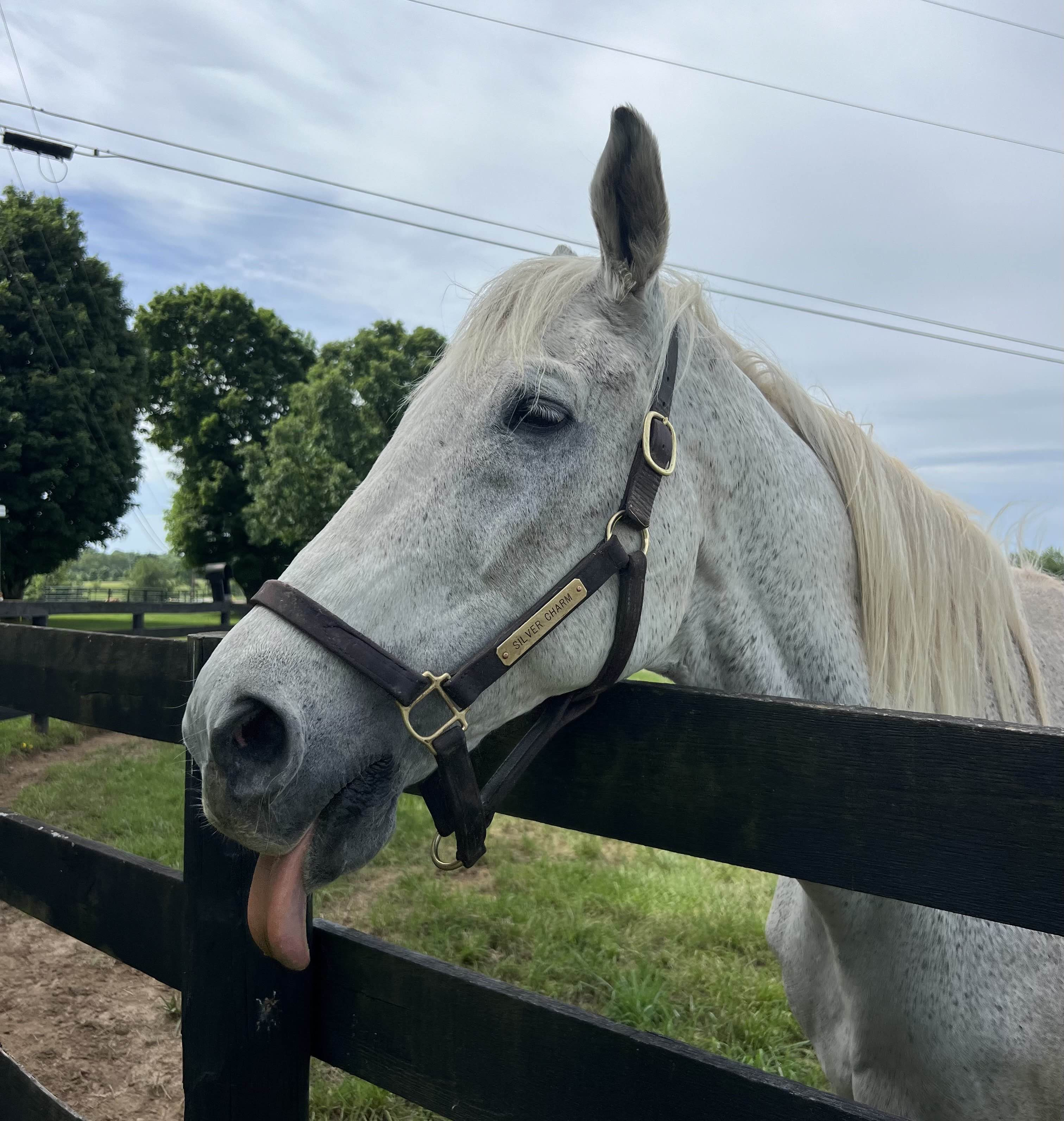
- Sire: Silver Buck
- Grandsire: Buckpasser
- Dam: Bonnie's Poker
- Damsire: Poker
- Sex: Stallion
- Foaled: February 22, 1994 (age 32)
- Country: USA
- Color: Gray
- Breeder: Mary Lou Wootton
- Owner: Bob & Beverly Lewis
- Trainer: Bob Baffert
- Record: 24: 12-7-2
- Earnings: $6,944,369

Major wins
- Del Mar Futurity (1996); San Vicente Stakes (1997); San Fernando Stakes (1998); Clark Handicap (1998); Dubai World Cup (1998); Kentucky Cup Classic Handicap (1998); San Pasqual Handicap (1999); Goodwood Stakes (1998); Strub Stakes (1998); American Triple Crown Race wins: Kentucky Derby (1997); Preakness Stakes (1997)

Awards
- United States Champion 3-Year-Old Colt (1997)

Honours
- United States' Racing Hall of Fame (2007) #63 - Top 100 U.S. Racehorses of the 20th Century

Silver Charm (foaled February 22, 1994) is a champion American Thoroughbred racehorse who won the 1997 Kentucky Derby and Preakness Stakes and 1998 Dubai World Cup (of all of which he is the oldest surviving winner). He stood at stud in the United States and Japan, and is now retired at Old Friends Farm in Kentucky.

Upon the death of Hansel, Silver Charm became the oldest living winner of the Preakness Stakes; upon the death of Grindstone, he also became the oldest living winner of the Kentucky Derby; the last surviving Derby winner born in the 20th century; and, upon the 2022 death of 1996 Belmont Stakes winner Editor's Note, Silver Charm became the oldest living winner of an American Triple Crown race.

== Background and early career ==
Silver Charm was foaled in Florida on February 22, 1994, at Silverleaf Farm, out of the mare Bonnie's Poker and sired by Silver Buck, who was a son of Buckpasser. He was a gray colt with a blaze and was bred by Mary Lou Wootton. As a two-year-old Silver Charm was purchased by trainer Bob Baffert for $85,000, and then resold to Beverly and Robert Lewis, who kept him in training with Baffert. Silver Charm's first win was as a two-year-old, in the Del Mar Futurity. Silver Charm entered the 1997 Kentucky Derby with Gary Stevens as his jockey. Silver Charm drew the sixth post position out of a field of 13, and broke well at the starting gate. He came out between other horses going into the backstretch and took the lead with less than a furlong to go. He won the Derby, finishing a head in front of Captain Bodgit. It was Baffert's second time entering the Kentucky Derby or any American classic race; his horse Cavonnier had come in second the year before. Silver Charm won the Preakness Stakes in the same manner, pulling ahead of Captain Bodgit and Free House just before the wire.

Silver Charm lost the third jewel of the Triple Crown by placing second in the 1997 Belmont Stakes to Touch Gold; he lost by three quarters of a length. He was the winner of the 1997 Eclipse Award for Outstanding Three-Year-Old Male Horse. He closed out his sophomore season with a runner-up finish in the Malibu Stakes.

== Later racing career ==
At age 4, Silver Charm won the 1998 Dubai World Cup, San Fernando Stakes, Strub Stakes, Kentucky Cup Classic Handicap, Goodwood Handicap (now called the Awesome Again Stakes), and the Clark Handicap. He also finished second in both the Stephen Foster Handicap and Breeders' Cup Classic.

At age 5, Silver Charm won the 1999 San Pasqual Handicap and placed third in both the Donn Handicap and Santa Anita Handicap. He also competed in the 1999 Dubai World Cup, finishing sixth. After his fourth-place finish in the Stephen Foster Handicap, Silver Charm was retired.

== Stud career ==
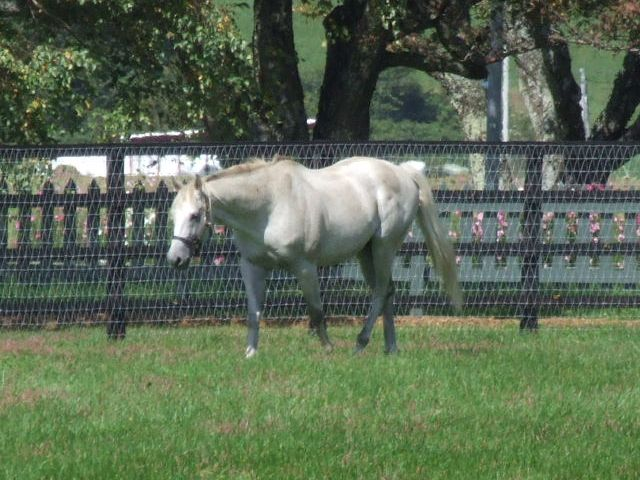
Silver Charm in Japan (2006)

Following the end of his race career, Silver Charm was retired to Three Chimneys Farm in Kentucky for an initial stud fee of $25,000. He stood stud in North America for five seasons, siring five crops of foals. In 2004 he was purchased by the Japanese Breeders Association, and was sent to stud in Japan. He stood at the Shizunai Stallion Station in December 2004. In 2008, he stood at the Shichinohe Stallion Station and in 2009, at the Iburi Stallion Station.

Silver Charm's North American progeny features 15 stakes winners, most notably multiple graded stakes winners Preachinatthebar and Miss Isella. Silver Charm was not particularly successful in Japan, of 149 foals of racing age, he has been represented by one stakes-placed runner (in Korea). Overall, however, Silver Charm's progeny have made $2 million and won more than 1,000 races.

== Honors ==
In the Blood-Horse magazine List of the Top 100 Racehorses of the 20th Century, Silver Charm was ranked #63.

In 2007, Silver Charm was inducted into the United States Racing Hall of Fame.

== Retirement ==
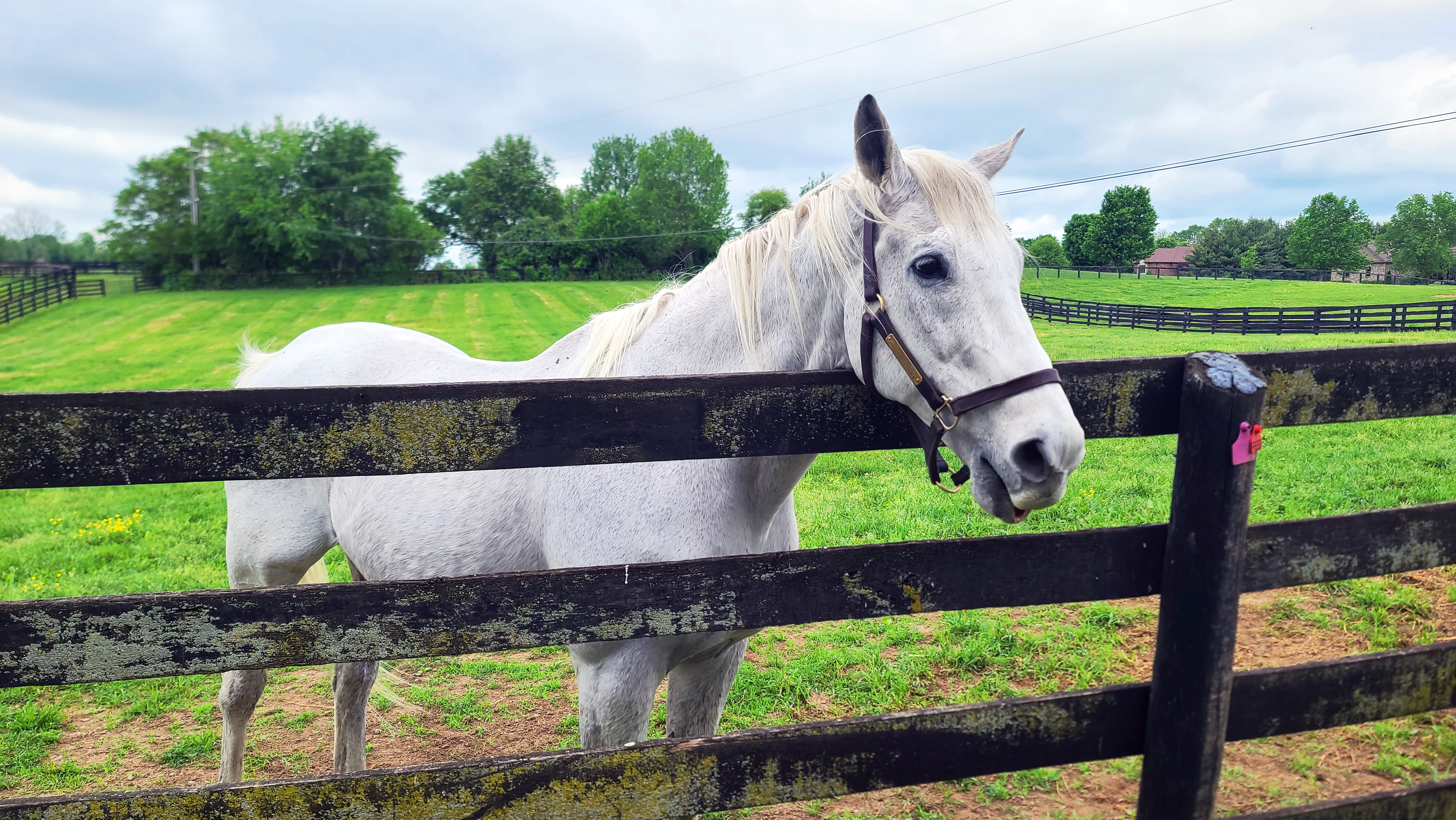
Silver Charm at the Old Friends Equine annual fundraiser, the day after the Kentucky Derby - May 5, 2024

Silver Charm went to Japan to the Shizunai Stallion Station in 2004, with a so-called "buy-back clause" included in his sales contract. Since the slaughterhouse death of Kentucky Derby winner Ferdinand, the New York Owners and Breeder's Association has begun asking for a small voluntary per-race charge called the "Ferdinand Fee". These monies are intended for the Bluegrass Charities and the Thoroughbred Charities of America to help fund racehorse rescue and retirement groups and keep horses from slaughter when their breeding or racing careers are over. This has led racehorse owners to include buy-back clauses within their stallion contracts.

On October 29, 2014, it was announced jointly by Three Chimneys Farm and Old Friends Farm that Silver Charm would return from Japan and be retired permanently at Old Friends Equine, a horse retirement facility, in Georgetown, Kentucky. Beverly Lewis and her son Steve paid to bring Silver Charm back to Kentucky, where he remains at Old Friends and can be visited by the public.

== Pedigree ==
Pedigree of Silver Charm
Sire Silver Buck gray 1978	Buckpasser bay 1963	Tom Fool bay 1949	Menow
Sire Silver Buck gray 1978	Buckpasser bay 1963	Tom Fool bay 1949	Gaga
Sire Silver Buck gray 1978	Buckpasser bay 1963	Busanda black 's 1947	War Admiral
Sire Silver Buck gray 1978	Buckpasser bay 1963	Busanda black 's 1947	Businesslike
Sire Silver Buck gray 1978	Silver True gray 1964	Hail To Reason brown 1958	Turn-To
Sire Silver Buck gray 1978	Silver True gray 1964	Hail To Reason brown 1958	Nothirdchance
Sire Silver Buck gray 1978	Silver True gray 1964	Silver Fog gray 1944	Mahmoud
Sire Silver Buck gray 1978	Silver True gray 1964	Silver Fog gray 1944	Equilette
Dam Bonnie's Poker dark brown 1982	Poker bay 1963	Round Table bay 1954	Princequillo
Dam Bonnie's Poker dark brown 1982	Poker bay 1963	Round Table bay 1954	Knights Daughter
Dam Bonnie's Poker dark brown 1982	Poker bay 1963	Glamour bay 1953	Nasrullah
Dam Bonnie's Poker dark brown 1982	Poker bay 1963	Glamour bay 1953	Striking
Dam Bonnie's Poker dark brown 1982	What A Surprise bay 1968	Wise Margin bay 1950	Market Wise
Dam Bonnie's Poker dark brown 1982	What A Surprise bay 1968	Wise Margin bay 1950	One Ripple
Dam Bonnie's Poker dark brown 1982	What A Surprise bay 1968	Militant Miss brown 1951	Faultless
Dam Bonnie's Poker dark brown 1982	What A Surprise bay 1968	Militant Miss brown 1951	Miss Militant
