= 1997 Kentucky Derby =

Horse race

123rd Kentucky Derby
- Kentucky Derby
- Location: Churchill Downs
- Date: May 3, 1997
- Winning horse: Silver Charm
- Jockey: Gary Stevens
- Trainer: Bob Baffert
- Owner: Bob & Beverly Lewis
- Conditions: Fast
- Surface: Dirt
- Attendance: 141,981

The 1997 Kentucky Derby was the 123rd running of the Kentucky Derby. The race took place on May 3, 1997, and was won by Silver Charm, ridden by Gary Stevens. There were 141,981 in attendance.

== Payout ==
The 123rd Kentucky Derby Payout Schedule

Program Number	Horse Name	Win	Place	Show
6	Silver Charm	$ 10.00	$4.80	$4.20
5	Captain Bodgit	-	$4.80	$3.80
12	Free House	-	-	$5.80

- $2 Exacta: (6-5) Paid $31.00
- $2 Trifecta: (6-5-12) Paid $205.40
- $1 Superfecta: (6-5-12-8) Paid $350.00

== Full results ==
Finished	Program Number	Horse	Jockey	Trainer	Owner	Time / behind
1st	6	Silver Charm	Gary Stevens	Bob Baffert	Bob & Beverly Lewis	2:02.44
2nd	5	Captain Bodgit	Alex Solis	Gary A. Capuano	Team Valor	
3rd	12	Free House	David Flores	J. Paco Gonzalez	John Toffan & Trudy McCaffery	
4th	8	Pulpit	Shane Sellers	Frank L. Brothers	Claiborne Farm	
5th	2	Crypto Star	Pat Day	Wayne M. Catalano	Evelyn & Darrell Yates	
6th	3	Phantom on Tour	Jerry D. Bailey	Lynn S. Whiting	W. Cal Partee	
7th	1	Jack Flash	Craig Perret	Nick Zito	Dogwood Stable	
8th	9	Hello	Mike Smith	Ronald McAnally	Sandee & Al Kirkwood	
9th	4	Concerto	Carlos H. Marquez Jr.	John J. Tammaro, III	Kinsman Stable	
10th	7	Celtic Warrior	Francisco Torres	Danny Hutt	Hutt, Quackenbush & Shaffrick	
11th	11	Crimson Classic	Robby Albarado	Forrest Kaelin	John W. Clay	
12th	1A	Shammy Davis	Willie Martinez	Nick Zito	Fox Hill Farm	
13th	10	Deeds Not Words	Corey Nakatani	D. Wayne Lukas	Michael Tabor & Susan Magnier	
