= Captain Bodgit =

American-bred Thoroughbred racehorse

- Sire: Saint Ballado
- Grandsire: Halo
- Dam: Answering Echo
- Damsire: Greek Answer
- Sex: Stallion
- Foaled: 1994
- Country: United States
- Color: Bay
- Breeder: Edward Wiest
- Owner: Team Valor Stable
- Trainer: Gary Capuano
- Record: 12: 7-1-4
- Earnings: $1,014,849

Major wins
- Laurel Futurity Stakes (1996); Dover Stakes (1996); Bimelech Stakes (1996); Florida Derby (1997); Wood Memorial Stakes (1997)
- Last updated on September 7, 2009

Captain Bodgit (foaled in 1994) is a millionaire American Thoroughbred racehorse who is a multiple stakes winner, including the Grade 1 Florida Derby and Grade 2 Wood Memorial. He is best known for his "flying" closing finishes in the first two legs of the U.S. Triple Crown races in 1997. Out of the mare Answering Echo, he was sired by Saint Ballado.

== Two-year-old season ==
Captain Bodgit was a highly regarded two-year-old colt training in Maryland who won the prestigious Laurel Futurity, a graded stakes race, after winning both the Dover Stakes at Delaware Park and Bimelech Stakes at Laurel Park. Then he shipped to Florida for the winter and spring. In Florida, Captain Bodgit finished third in his first start in the grade three Holy Bull Stakes. After that performance, he was bought by the syndicate Team Valor.

== Three-year-old season ==
After Team Valor purchased Captain Bodgit, they kept him in the barn of Maryland trainer Gary Capuano. He raced in the grade two Fountain of Youth Stakes and finished third. In his second start for Team Valor, Captain Bodgit upset then-unbeaten champion Pulpit and multiple graded stakes winner Frisk Me Now in the grade one $1,000,000 Florida Derby at Gulfstream Park. Shipped north to Aqueduct Racetrack in New York, New York, he won the grade two $750,000 Wood Memorial Stakes.

Captain Bodgit was post-time favorite for both the Kentucky Derby and the Preakness Stakes. He began the Derby by rating far back the way under jockey Alex Solis, as he had done in previous races. Then he commenced his rally midway on the turn and closed rapidly on the leaders under intense whip urging, but lost by a head to dual classic winner Silver Charm after a prolonged stretch duel. It was nearly five lengths back to third-place finisher Free House, who had won the Santa Anita Derby, with Blue Grass Stakes winner Pulpit in fourth.

Thousands of fans bet him to reverse the placings with Silver Charm in the Preakness, making him the post time favorite again. All three top finishers in the Derby hit the wire together in the closest three-way finish in the Preakness in 85 years. Captain Bodgit ran out of room and lost to Silver Charm by a neck. He closed an enormous amount of ground in the final 100 yards in a fixture voted the "race of the decade" in a fan poll conducted by The Blood-Horse. Captain Bodgit never made the Belmont, as he sustained a minor injury in the Preakness Stakes and was retired.

== Retirement ==
Captain Bodgit entered stud in 1998 at Margaux Farm in Midway, Kentucky, and stood there his first four seasons for a fee of $10,000. He was the sire of nine graded stakes winners, including multiple graded winner Winward Passage. He is the sire of 13 stakes winners of $100,000 or more to date and produced 42 individual winners from 89 starters in his time at Margaux. In 2003, he was sold and transferred to Questroyal Stud near New Hampton, New York, for four more years at a stud fee of $5,000. His total progeny earnings are over $7 million. In 2009, he was sold and transferred to Highfield Stock Farm in Okotoks, Alberta, Canada, and is standing there with a stud fee of $2,000.
