= 1968 European Figure Skating Championships =

Figure skating competition

1968 European Championships
- Type: ISU Championship
- Date: January 23 – 27
- Season: 1967-68
- Location: Västerås, Sweden
- Venue: ABB Arena

Champions
- Men's singles: (Austria) Emmerich Danzer
- Ladies' singles: (Czechoslovakia) Hana Mašková
- Pairs: (Soviet Union) Lyudmila Belousova / Oleg Protopopov
- Ice dance: (United Kingdom) Diane Towler / Bernard Ford
- Previous: 1967 European Championships
- Next: 1969 European Championships

The 1968 European Figure Skating Championships were held in Västerås, Sweden from January 23 to 27. Elite senior-level figure skaters from European ISU member nations competed for the title of European Champion in the disciplines of men's singles, ladies' singles, pair skating, and ice dancing.

== Results ==
=== Men ===
Rank	Name	Places
1	(Austria) Emmerich Danzer	
2	(Austria) Wolfgang Schwarz	
3	(Czechoslovakia) Ondrej Nepela	
4	(France) Patrick Péra	
5	(Soviet Union) Sergey Chetverukhin	
6	(West Germany) Peter Krick	
7	(Czechoslovakia) Marian Filc	
8	(East Germany) Günter Zöller	
9	(France) Philippe Pélissier	
10	(Soviet Union) Vladimir Kurenbin	
11	(Italy) Giordano Abbondati	
12	(Soviet Union) Sergey Volkov	
13	(United Kingdom) Michael Williams	
14	(West Germany) Jürgen Eberwein	
15	(Austria) Günter Anderl	
16	(France) Jacques Mrozek	
17	(Poland) Zdzisław Pieńkowski	
18	(Hungary) Zoltán Horváth	
19	(Switzerland) Daniel Höner	
20	(Sweden) Thomas Callerud	
21	(East Germany) Jan Hoffmann	
22	(Netherlands) Arnoud Hendriks	
23	(Norway) Erik Skjold	

=== Ladies ===
Rank	Name	Places
1	(Czechoslovakia) Hana Mašková	
2	(East Germany) Gabriele Seyfert	
3	(Austria) Beatrix Schuba	
4	(Hungary) Zsuzsa Almássy	33
5	(United Kingdom) Sally-Anne Stapleford	
6	(Soviet Union) Yelena Shcheglova	
7	(Austria) Elisabeth Nestler	
8	(West Germany) Monika Feldmann	
9	(United Kingdom) Patricia Dodd	
10	(West Germany) Petra Ruhrmann	
11	(Austria) Elisabeth Mikula	
12	(Soviet Union) Galina Grzhibovskaya	
13	(Czechoslovakia) Marie Víchová	
14	(East Germany) Martina Clausner	
15	(Switzerland) Charlotte Walter	
16	(United Kingdom) Frances Waghorn	
17	(East Germany) Sonja Morgenstern	
18	(Italy) Rita Trapanese	
19	(France) Sylvaine Duban	
20	(Netherlands) Anneke Heijdt	
21	(Romania) Elena Mois	
22	(Norway) Tone Øien	
23	(Sweden) Eva Hermansson	
24	(Denmark) Jette Vad	
25	(Socialist Federal Republic of Yugoslavia) Dunja Vujčić	

=== Pairs ===
Rank	Name	Places
1	(Soviet Union) Lyudmila Belousova / Oleg Protopopov	
2	(Soviet Union) Tamara Moskvina / Aleksey Mishin	
3	(East Germany) Heidemarie Steiner / Heinz-Ulrich Walther	
4	(West Germany) Margot Glockshuber / Wolfgang Danne	
5	(Soviet Union) Irina Rodnina / Aleksey Ulanov	
6	(West Germany) Gudrun Hauss / Walter Häfner	
7	(East Germany) Irene Müller / Hans-Georg Dallmer	
8	(Czechoslovakia) Liana Drahová / Peter Bartosiewicz	
9	(West Germany) Marianne Streifler / Herbert Wiesinger	
10	(East Germany) Brigitte Weise / Michael Brychy	
11	(Czechoslovakia) Bohunka Šrámková / Jan Šrámek	
12	(Austria) Evelyne Schneider / Wilhelm Bietak	
13	(United Kingdom) Linda Bernard / Raymond Wilson	
14	(Switzerland) Mónika Szabó / Péter Szabó	
15	(Poland) Janina Poremska / Piotr Szczypa	
16	(Switzerland) Edith Sperl / Heinz Wirz	
17	(Socialist Federal Republic of Yugoslavia) Barbka Senk / Mitja Sketa	
18	(France) Fabienne Etlensperger / Jean-Roland Racle	
19	(Poland) Grażyna Osmańska / Adam Brodecki	
20	(Norway) Bjerke Magnussen / Erik Grünert	

=== Ice dance ===
Rank	Name	Places
1	(United Kingdom) Diane Towler / Bernard Ford	
2	(United Kingdom) Yvonne Suddick / Malcolm Cannon	
3	(United Kingdom) Janet Sawbridge / Jon Lane	
4	(Soviet Union) Irina Grishkova / Viktor Ryzhkin	
5	(Soviet Union) Lyudmila Pakhomova / Aleksandr Gorshkov	
6	(West Germany) Angelika Buck / Erich Buck	
7	(East Germany) Annerose Baier / Eberhard Rüger	
8	(Hungary) Edit Mató / Károly Csanádi	
9	(Czechoslovakia) Milena Tůmová / Josef Pešek	
10	(Czechoslovakia) Dana Novotná / Jaromír Holan	
11	(Italy) Susanna Carpani / Sergio Pirelli	
12	(Hungary) Ilona Berecz / István Sugár	
13	(France) Claude Couste / Jean-Pierre Noullet	
14	(France) Pascale Aynes / Pascal Germe	
15	(East Germany) Steffi Böhme / Bernd Egert	
16	(Poland) Teresa Weyna / Piotr Bojańczyk	
17	(West Germany) Edeltraud Rotty / Joachim Iglowstein	
