= 1969 World Figure Skating Championships =

Annual figure skating competition held in 1969

- Type: ISU Championship
- Date: February 25 – March 2
- Season: 1968–69
- Location: (United States) Colorado Springs, Colorado, USA
- Venue: Broadmoor World Arena

Champions
- Men's singles: (United States) Timothy Wood
- Ladies' singles: (East Germany) Gabriele Seyfert
- Pairs: (Soviet Union) Irina Rodnina / Aleksey Ulanov
- Ice dance: (United Kingdom) Diane Towler / Bernard Ford
- Previous: 1968 World Championships
- Next: 1970 World Championships

The 1969 World Figure Skating Championships were held in Colorado Springs, Colorado, USA from February 25 to March 2. At the event, sanctioned by the International Skating Union, medals were awarded in men's singles, ladies' singles, pair skating, and ice dance. The event was held at the former Broadmoor World Arena.

The singles champions included Tim Wood of the United States and Gabriele Seyfert of East Germany.

== Medal table ==
* Host nation (United States)

Rank	Nation	Gold	Silver	Bronze	Total
1	Soviet Union	1	2	1	4
2	United States*	1	0	1	2
3	East Germany	1	0	0	1
3	Great Britain	1	0	0	1
5	Austria	0	1	0	1
5	Czechoslovakia	0	1	0	1
7	France	0	0	1	1
7	Hungary	0	0	1	1
Totals (8 entries)		4	4	4	12

== Results ==
=== Men ===
Rank	Name	CP	FP	Points	Places
1	(United States) Timothy Wood	1	1	2894.5	9
2	(Czechoslovakia) Ondrej Nepela	2	6	2703.3	22
3	(France) Patrick Péra	3	5	2684.6	27
4	(United States) Gary Visconti	4	4	2622.4	41
5	(United States) John Petkevich	7	2	2623.4	45
6	(Canada) Jay Humphry	5	3	2652.1	47
7	(East Germany) Günter Zöller	6	10	2544.9	68
8	(Soviet Union) Sergey Chetverukhin	8	9	2531.6	72
9	(Czechoslovakia) Marian Filc	9	7	2497.9	83
10	(Canada) David McGillivray	13	8	2482.7	87
11	(Soviet Union) Yuriy Ovchinnikov	12	11	2434.8	97
12	(France) Philippe Pélissier	11	13	2405.9	106
13	(Japan) Tsuguhiko Kodzuka	14	14	2355.6	122
14	(France) Jacques Mrozek	16	12		123
15	(Austria) Günter Anderl	15	16	2319.1	134
16	(West Germany) Reinhard Ketterer	17	15	2278.4	142
17	(West Germany) Klaus Grimmelt	18	17	2222.0	152
WD	(United Kingdom) Haig Oundjian	10			DNF

- Referee: (Czechoslovakia) Josef Dědič
- Assistant Referee: (Canada) Donald Gilchrist

Judges:

- (France) Jeanine Donnier-Blanc
- (Czechoslovakia) Milan Duchoň
- (West Germany) Wilhelm Kahle
- (Canada) Dorothy Leamen
- (Soviet Union) Konstantin Likharev
- (Austria) Walter Malek
- (United Kingdom) Mollie Phillips
- (Switzerland) Rolf J. Steinmann (substitute)
- (East Germany) Helga Wiecki
- (United States) Benjamin T. Wright

=== Ladies ===
Rank	Name	CP	FP	Points	Places
1	(East Germany) Gabriele Seyfert	2	1	2795.5	9
2	(Austria) Beatrix Schuba	1	6	2709.4	24
3	(Hungary) Zsuzsa Almássy	3	4	2704.6	27
4	(United States) Julie Holmes	4	2	2696.2	33
5	(United States) Janet Lynn	5	5	2663.4	44
6	(Canada) Linda Carbonetto	9	3	2616.0	53
7	(Austria) Elisabeth Nestler	6	7	2572.8	62
8	(United Kingdom) Patricia Dodd	7	14	2495.1	87
9	(West Germany) Eileen Zillmer	8	12	2487.8	89
10	(Soviet Union) Yelena Shcheglova	12	8	2492.3	91
11	(Japan) Kazumi Yamashita	13	10	2472.1	96
12	(Austria) Elisabeth Mikula	10	11	2471.8	102
13	(Italy) Rita Trapanese	11	13	2461.2	105
14	(Soviet Union) Galina Grzhibovskaya	16	9	2400.6	127
15	(Switzerland) Charlotte Walter	14	15	2379.0	131
16	(Japan) Keiko Miyagawa	17	16	2266.8	144
17	(Australia) Janet Schwarz	18	17	2108.1	153
WD	(East Germany) Sonja Morgenstern	15			DNF

- Referee: (Hungary) Elemér Terták
- Assistant Referee: (Italy) Sonia Bianchetti

Judges:

- (Italy) Michele Beltrami
- (Canada) Donald B. Cruikshank
- (West Germany) Hans Fuchs
- (Austria) Ludwig Gassner
- (East Germany) Walburga Grimm
- (Hungary) Henrik Hajós
- (Czechoslovakia) Dagmar Řeháková
- (United States) Ardelle Sanderson
- (Switzerland) Rolf J. Steinmann (substitute)
- (Japan) Kinuko Ueno

=== Pairs ===
Rank	Name	SP	FP	Points	Places
1	(Soviet Union) Irina Rodnina / Aleksey Ulanov	1	1	421.1	9
2	(Soviet Union) Tamara Moskvina / Aleksey Mishin	3	2	410.9	23
3	(Soviet Union) Lyudmila Belousova / Oleg Protopopov	2	3	410.5	26
4	(United States) Cynthia Kauffman / Ronald Kauffman	4	5	405.0	36
5	(East Germany) Heidemarie Steiner / Heinz-Ulrich Walther	5	6	400.0	46
6	(United States) Alicia Starbuck / Kenneth Shelley	7	4	398.7	50
7	(West Germany) Gudrun Hauss / Walter Häfner	6	7	388.6	63
8	(United States) Melissa Militano / Mark Militano	10	8	374.1	75
9	(West Germany) Brunhilde Baßler / Eberhard Rausch	8	9	362.8	82
10	(Canada) Anna Forder / Richard Stephens	9	10	363.5	90
11	(France) Monique Szabo / Pierre Szabo	11	11	357.5	94
12	(United Kingdom) Linda Bernard / Raymond Wilson	13	12	344.2	109
13	(Austria) Evelyne Schneider / Wilhelm Bietak	14	13		116
WD	(Czechoslovakia) Liana Drahová / Peter Bartosiewicz	12			DNF

- Referee: (Switzerland) Karl Enderlin
- Assistant Referee: (United States) Henry M. Beatty

Judges:

- (West Germany) Hans Fuchs
- (Austria) Ludwig Gassner
- (France) Monique Georgelin
- (East Germany) Walburga Grimm
- (Canada) Dorothy Leamen
- (Soviet Union) Nonna Nestogina
- (United Kingdom) Mollie Phillips
- (Czechoslovakia) Emil Skákala
- (Switzerland) Rolf J. Steinmann (substitute)
- (United States) Benjamin T. Wright

=== Ice dance ===
Rank	Name	CD	FD	Points	Places
1	(United Kingdom) Diane Towler / Bernard Ford	1	1	259.8	7
2	(Soviet Union) Lyudmila Pakhomova / Aleksandr Gorshkov	2	2	252.0	16
3	(United States) Judy Schwomeyer / James Sladky	3	3	250.7	24
4	(United Kingdom) Janet Sawbridge / Jon Lane	4	4	246.9	27
5	(West Germany) Angelika Buck / Erich Buck	5	5	244.6	32
6	(East Germany) Annerose Baier / Eberhard Rüger	6	6	234.5	45
7	(United Kingdom) Susan Getty / Roy Bradshaw	7	7	232.3	51
8	(Czechoslovakia) Dana Holanová / Jaromír Holan	8	8	225.8	63
9	(United States) Debbie Gerken / Raymond Tiedemann	9	13	224.0	67.5
10	(United States) Joan Bitterman / Brad Hislop	10	10	220.9	72.5
11	(Canada) Donna Taylor / Bruce Lennie	11	9	223.8	74.5
12	(Canada) Mary Church / Tom Falls	13	12	218.2	84.5
13	(Hungary) Ilona Berecz / István Sugár	12	14	214.1	88
14	(Soviet Union) Tetyana Voytyuk / Vyacheslav Zhyhalyn	14	11	217.9	83
15	(West Germany) Edeltraud Rotty / Joachim Iglowstein	15	15	201.7	105

- Referee: (United Kingdom) Lawrence Demmy
- Assistant Referee: (United States) H. Kendall Kelley

Judges:

- (Czechoslovakia) Milan Duchoň
- (United States) Mabel Graham
- (Hungary) Henrik Hajós
- (United Kingdom) Robert S. Hudson
- (Canada) Barbara Lane
- (Austria) Walter Malek
- (West Germany) Eugen Romminger
