= 1969 European Figure Skating Championships =

Figure skating competition

1969 European Championships
- Type: ISU Championship
- Season: 1968-69
- Location: Garmisch-Partenkirchen, West Germany
- Venue: Olympia-Eissport-Zentrum

Champions
- Men's singles: (Czechoslovakia) Ondrej Nepela
- Ladies' singles: (East Germany) Gabriele Seyfert
- Pairs: (Soviet Union) Irina Rodnina / Aleksey Ulanov
- Ice dance: (United Kingdom) Diane Towler / Bernard Ford
- Previous: 1968 European Championships
- Next: 1970 European Championships

The 1969 European Figure Skating Championships were held at the Olympia-Eisstadion in Garmisch-Partenkirchen, West Germany. Elite senior-level figure skaters from European ISU member nations competed for the title of European Champion in the disciplines of men's singles, ladies' singles, pair skating, and ice dancing.

== Results ==
=== Men ===
Rank	Name	Places
1	(Czechoslovakia) Ondrej Nepela	
2	(France) Patrick Péra	
3	(Soviet Union) Sergey Chetverukhin	
4	(East Germany) Günter Zöller	
5	(France) Philippe Pélissier	
6	(United Kingdom) Haig Oundjian	
7	(Soviet Union) Sergey Volkov	
8	(Czechoslovakia) Marian Filc	
9	(Soviet Union) Yuriy Ovchinnikov	
10	(France) Jacques Mrozek	
11	(Austria) Günter Anderl	
12	(West Germany) Reinhard Ketterer	
13	(West Germany) Klaus Grimmelt	
14	(Austria) Josef Schneider	
15	(Switzerland) Daniel Höner	
16	(East Germany) Jan Hoffmann	
17	(Poland) Zdzisław Pieńkowski	
18	(Czechoslovakia) Petr Starec	
19	(Hungary) Zoltán Horváth	
20	(Sweden) Thomas Callerud	
21	(Netherlands) Arnoud Hendriks	
22	(Romania) György Fazekas	
23	(Finland) Ragnar Wikström	

=== Ladies ===
Rank	Name	Places
1	(East Germany) Gabriele Seyfert	
2	(Czechoslovakia) Hana Mašková	
3	(Austria) Beatrix Schuba	
4	(Hungary) Zsuzsa Almássy	36
5	(Austria) Elisabeth Nestler	
6	(Soviet Union) Yelena Shcheglova	
7	(Austria) Elisabeth Mikula	
8	(Italy) Rita Trapanese	
9	(United Kingdom) Patricia Dodd	
10	(West Germany) Eileen Zillmer	
11	(Switzerland) Charlotte Walter	
12	(East Germany) Sonja Morgenstern	
13	(Czechoslovakia) Ľudmila Bezáková	
14	(Soviet Union) Galina Grzhibovskaya	
15	(Czechoslovakia) Eleonora Barická	
16	(West Germany) Renate Zehnpfennig	
17	(United Kingdom) Frances Waghorn	
18	(East Germany) Christine Errath	
19	(Hungary) Zsófia Wagner	
20	(Sweden) Britt Elfving	
21	(Hungary) Zsuzsa Homolya	
22	(Poland) Mirosława Nowak	
23	(Romania) Elena Mois	

=== Pairs ===
Rank	Name	Places
1	(Soviet Union) Irina Rodnina / Aleksey Ulanov	
2	(Soviet Union) Lyudmila Belousova / Oleg Protopopov	
3	(Soviet Union) Tamara Moskvina / Aleksey Mishin	
4	(East Germany) Heidemarie Steiner / Heinz-Ulrich Walther	
5	(West Germany) Gudrun Hauss / Walter Häfner	
6	(West Germany) Marianne Streifler / Herbert Wiesinger	
7	(East Germany) Manuela Groß / Uwe Kagelmann	
8	(Poland) Janina Poremska / Piotr Szczypa	
9	(France) Monique Szabo / Pierre Szabo	
10	(Austria) Evelyne Schneider / Wilhelm Bietak	
11	(United Kingdom) Linda Bernard / Raymond Wilson	
12	(Czechoslovakia) Dana Fialová / Josef Tůma	

=== Ice dance ===
Rank	Name	Places
1	(United Kingdom) Diane Towler / Bernard Ford	
2	(United Kingdom) Janet Sawbridge / Jon Lane	
3	(Soviet Union) Lyudmila Pakhomova / Aleksandr Gorshkov	
4	(West Germany) Angelika Buck / Erich Buck	
5	(East Germany) Annerose Baier / Eberhard Rüger	
6	(United Kingdom) Susan Getty / Roy Bradshaw	
7	(Czechoslovakia) Dana Holanová / Jaromír Holan	
8	(Hungary) Ilona Berecz / István Sugár	
9	(Czechoslovakia) Milena Tůmová / Josef Pešek	
10	(Soviet Union) Tetyana Voytyuk / Vyacheslav Zhyhalyn	
11	(Soviet Union) Yelena Zharkova / Gennadiy Karponosov	
12	(Hungary) Edit Mató / Károly Csanádi	
13	(West Germany) Edeltraud Rotty / Joachim Iglowstein	
14	Eliane Vachon-France / Jean-Pierre Noullet	
15	(Poland) Teresa Weyna / Piotr Bojańczyk	
16	(Austria) Elfriede Rupp / Walter Leschetizky	
17	(Switzerland) Christiane Dällenbach / Léo Barblan	
