= 1970 World Figure Skating Championships =

Annual figure skating competition held in 1970

- Type: ISU Championship
- Date: 3 March – 8 March
- Season: 1969–70
- Location: (Socialist Federal Republic of Yugoslavia) Ljubljana, Slovenia, Yugoslavia
- Venue: Hala Tivoli

Champions
- Men's singles: (United States) Tim Wood
- Ladies' singles: (East Germany) Gabriele Seyfert
- Pairs: (Soviet Union) Irina Rodnina / Aleksey Ulanov
- Ice dance: (Soviet Union) Lyudmila Pakhomova / Aleksandr Gorshkov
- Previous: 1969 World Championships
- Next: 1971 World Championships

The 1970 World Figure Skating Championships were held at the Hala Tivoli in Ljubljana, SR Slovenia, SFR Yugoslavia from 3 to 8 March. At the event, sanctioned by the International Skating Union, medals were awarded in men's singles, ladies' singles, pair skating, and ice dance.

Irina Rodnina and Alexei Ulanov of Russia defended their title in pairs figure skating.

== Medal table ==
* Host nation (Yugoslavia)

Rank	Nation	Gold	Silver	Bronze	Total
1	Soviet Union	2	1	0	3
2	United States	1	1	1	3
3	East Germany	1	0	2	3
4	Austria	0	1	0	1
4	Czechoslovakia	0	1	0	1
6	West Germany	0	0	1	1
Totals (6 entries)		4	4	4	12

== Results ==
=== Men ===
Rank	Name	CP	FP	Points	Places
1	(United States) Timothy Wood	2	1	2779.3	12
2	(Czechoslovakia) Ondrej Nepela	1	3	2757.6	15
3	(East Germany) Günter Zöller	3	5	2702.0	32
4	(France) Patrick Péra	4	6	2682.8	39
5	(United States) John Petkevich	5	2	2672.2	41
6	(Soviet Union) Sergey Chetverukhin	6	4	2645.1	50
7	(Soviet Union) Sergey Volkov	7	10	2556.2	68
8	(United States) Kenneth Shelley	8	9	2534.0	77
9	(United Kingdom) Haig Oundjian	10	7	2527.3	78
10	(East Germany) Jan Hoffmann	11	11	2469.7	94
11	(Canada) David McGillivray	12	8		101
12	(Austria) Günter Anderl	9	14		100
13	(Canada) Toller Cranston	15	12		114
14	(Czechoslovakia) Zdeněk Pazdírek	14	17		133
15	(France) Jacques Mrozek	16	13		137.5
16	(Hungary) László Vajda	17	15		141.5
17	(West Germany) Klaus Grimmelt	18	16		149
18	(Czechoslovakia) Jozef Žídek	19	18		160
19	(France) Didier Gailhaguet	20	19		170
20	(Japan) Yutaka Higuchi	21	20		178
21	(Socialist Federal Republic of Yugoslavia) Zoran Matas	22	21		189
WD	(Switzerland) Daniel Höner	13			DNF

- Referee: (Hungary) Elemér Terták
- Assistant Referee: (Italy) Sonia Bianchetti

Judges:

- (Soviet Union) Tatyana Danilenko
- (France) Jeanine Donnier-Blanc
- (Czechoslovakia) Milan Duchón
- (West Germany) Hans Fuchs (substitute)
- (United States) Mabel Graham
- (Hungary) Márta Mesterházi-Nagy, Mrs. Léces Hungarian names#Married names
- (United Kingdom) Mollie Phillips
- (East Germany) Helga Wiecki
- (Canada) Audrey Williams
- (Austria) Franz Wojtanowskyj

=== Ladies ===
Rank	Name	CP	FP	Points	Places
1	(East Germany) Gabriele Seyfert	2	1	2808.7	9
2	(Austria) Beatrix Schuba	1	7	2729.0	21
3	(United States) Julie Holmes	3	5	2660.7	38
4	(Canada) Karen Magnussen	7	3	2672.8	38
5	(Hungary) Zsuzsa Almássy	5	4	2659.1	42
6	(United States) Janet Lynn	8	2	2671.4	43
7	(United States) Dawn Glab	6	10	2572.4	67
8	(Italy) Rita Trapanese	9	6	2556.9	73
9	(United Kingdom) Patricia Dodd	8	12	2533.3	80
10	(Canada) Cathy Irwin	13	8	2497.9	96
11	(East Germany) Sonja Morgenstern	14	9	2467.7	100
12	(Soviet Union) Yelena Shcheglova	11	12	2470.8	101
13	(Switzerland) Charlotte Walter	12	16		126
14	(Soviet Union) Yelena Aleksandrova	16	11	2398.5	127
15	(West Germany) Eileen Zillmer	10	17		129
16	(Japan) Kazumi Yamashita	17	15		146
17	(Czechoslovakia) Ľudmila Bezáková	18	14		151
18	(United Kingdom) Frances Waghorn	15	19		152
19	(East Germany) Simone Gräfe	19	20	2225.1	173
20	(West Germany) Judith Beyer	20	18		178
21	(Austria) Wilfriede Reiter	21	21		189

- Referee: (Hungary) Elemér Terták
- Assistant Referee: (Italy) Sonia Bianchetti

Judges:

- (United Kingdom) Pamela Davis
- (East Germany) Walburga Grimm
- (Austria) Franz Heinlein
- (West Germany) Wilhelm Kahle
- (Hungary) Ferenc Kertész
- (Canada) Ralph McCreath
- (United States) Yvonne S. McGowan
- (Soviet Union) Nonna Nestogina Картавенко, Нонна Алексеевна
- (Switzerland) René Schlageter
- (Italy) Giorgio Siniscalco (substitute)

=== Pairs ===
Rank	Name	SP	FP	Points	Places
1	(Soviet Union) Irina Rodnina / Aleksey Ulanov	1	1	418.6	11
2	(Soviet Union) Lyudmila Smirnova / Andrey Suraykin	2	2	416.5	16
3	(East Germany) Heidemarie Walther / Heinz-Ulrich Walther	3	3	410.2	27
4	(Soviet Union) Galina Karelina / Georgiy Proskurin	4	4	405.4	36.5
5	(United States) Alicia Starbuck / Kenneth Shelley	5	5	401.2	46.5
6	(West Germany) Almut Lehmann / Herbert Wiesinger	6	6	394.4	53
7	(East Germany) Manuela Groß / Uwe Kagelmann	7	7	388.1	64
8	(United States) Melissa Militano / Mark Militano	10	8	377.5	75
9	(West Germany) Brunhilde Baßler / Eberhard Rausch	8	9	378.0	78
10	(Poland) Janina Poremska / Piotr Szczypa	11	10	357.1	102
11	(France) Monique Szabo / Pierre Szabo	13	11		101
12	(Czechoslovakia) Dana Fialová / Josef Tůma	9	12		111
13	(Austria) Evelyne Schneider / Wilhelm Bietak	15	13		119
14	(Canada) Sandra Bezic / Val Bezic	14	14		120
15	(Canada) Mary Petrie / Robert McAvoy	12	15		121
16	(Japan) Kotoe Nagasawa / Hiroshi Nagakubo	16	16		143
17	(Socialist Federal Republic of Yugoslavia) Helena Gazvoda / Silvo Švejger	17	17		153

- Referee: (Switzerland) Karl Enderlin
- Assistant Referee: (Austria) Walter Malek

Judges:

- (France) Liliane Caffin-Madaule
- (Czechoslovakia) Milan Duchón (substitute)
- (West Germany) Hans Fuchs
- (Austria) Ludwig Gassner
- (East Germany) Carla Listing
- (Canada) Ralph McCreath
- (United States) Yvonne S. McGowan
- (Japan) Kikuko Minami
- (Soviet Union) Nonna Nestogina
- (Poland) Maria Zuchowicz

=== Ice dance ===
Rank	Name	CD	FD	Points	Places
1	(Soviet Union) Lyudmila Pakhomova / Aleksandr Gorshkov	2	1	511.4	14
2	(United States) Judy Schwomeyer / James Sladky	1	2	511.3	15
3	(West Germany) Angelika Buck / Erich Buck	3	3	503.2	25
4	(Soviet Union) Tetyana Voytyuk / Vyacheslav Zhyhalyn	5	4	488.6	40
5	(United Kingdom) Susan Getty / Roy Bradshaw	4	5	485.0	43
6	(East Germany) Annerose Baier / Eberhard Rüger	7	6	473.4	59
7	(United Kingdom) Janet Sawbridge / Peter Dalby	6	8	477.2	60
8	(Soviet Union) Yelena Zharkova / Gennadiy Karponosov	8	7	468.4	74
9	(United States) Debbie Ganson / Brad Hislop	9	9	459.8	80.5
10	(United States) Anne Millier / Harvey Millier	11	10	450.3	94
11	(Czechoslovakia) Diana Skotnická / Martin Skotnický	12	11		100
12	(Hungary) Ilona Berecz / István Sugár	10	14		108.5
13	(Poland) Teresa Weyna / Piotr Bojańczyk	13	13		116
14	(Canada) Mary Church / David Sutton	14	12		120
15	(Czechoslovakia) Světlana Marinovová / Miloš Buršík	15	15		136
16	(France) Anne-Claude Wolfers / Roland Mars	16	16		144
17	(Austria) Brigitte Scheijbal / Kurt Jaschek	17	17		149
18	(West Germany) Angelika Wiesner / Hans-Jürgen Wiesner	18	18		161

- Referee: (United Kingdom) Lawrence Demmy
- Assistant Referee: (Czechoslovakia) Emil Skákala

Judges:

- (Canada) George J. Blundun
- (United States) Mabel Graham
- (Hungary) Henrik Hajós
- (Czechoslovakia) Miroslav Hasenöhrl
- (Soviet Union) Igor Kabanov Кабанов, Игорь Александрович
- (East Germany) Carla Listing
- (France) Jacqueline Meudec
- (United Kingdom) Mollie Phillips
- (West Germany) Eugen Romminger
- (Poland) Maria Zuchowicz (substitute)
