= 1971 European Figure Skating Championships =

Figure skating competition

1971 European Championships
- Type: ISU Championship
- Date: February 2 – 7
- Season: 1970-71
- Location: Zürich, Switzerland
- Venue: Hallenstadion

Champions
- Men's singles: (Czechoslovakia) Ondrej Nepela
- Ladies' singles: (Austria) Beatrix Schuba
- Pairs: (Soviet Union) Irina Rodnina / Aleksey Ulanov
- Ice dance: (Soviet Union) Lyudmila Pakhomova / Aleksandr Gorshkov
- Previous: 1970 European Championships
- Next: 1972 European Championships

The 1971 European Figure Skating Championships was a senior-level international competition held at the Hallenstadion in Zürich, Switzerland on February 2–7. Elite senior-level figure skaters from European ISU member nations competed for the title of European Champion in the disciplines of men's singles, ladies' singles, pair skating, and ice dancing.

The pair skating event demonstrated the dominance of the Soviet Union in this discipline. Irina Rodnina and Aleksey Ulanov took the title in spite of a fall by Ulanov on a double Axel, a side-by-side jump not being attempted by any other team.

The ice dance competition was a contrast between the British and Russian styles of dance. British-trained Angelika and Erich Buck narrowly lost a 5–4 decision to Lyudmila Pakhomova and Aleksandr Gorshkov, who as usual were criticized for their unequal balance of skills.

Ondrej Nepela ran away with the men's title following the withdrawal of his two top challengers, Patrick Péra and Günter Zöller, due to injuries. Nepela's victory was more the result of his strong showing in the compulsory figures than for his rather undistinguished free skating. The free skating portion of the competition was won by Haig Oundjian, who landed triple toe loop and triple salchow jumps and moved up from 6th after the figures to take the bronze medal. In the CF finished second Sergey Chetverukhin, behind Nepela and in the FS finished second Nepela behind Oundjian.

The ladies event was likewise decided by the compulsory figures as Beatrix Schuba dominated that part of the competition. The free skating was won by Sonja Morgenstern, who landed a triple salchow jump in her program—at that time it was very rare for women to attempt triple jumps. Morgenstern had placed a distant 8th in the figures. Schuba was heavily criticized for the poor quality of her free skating, which included a fall on a relatively simple double loop as well as a definite underrotation on her double Axel.

== Results ==
=== Men ===
Rank	Name	Places
1	(Czechoslovakia) Ondrej Nepela	
2	(Soviet Union) Sergey Chetverukhin	
3	(United Kingdom) Haig Oundjian	
4	(East Germany) Jan Hoffmann	
5	(Soviet Union) Yuriy Ovchinnikov	
6	(Soviet Union) Sergey Volkov	
7	(United Kingdom) John Curry	
8	(Austria) Günter Anderl	
9	(France) Jacques Mrozek	
10	(France) Didier Gailhaguet	
11	(Switzerland) Daniel Höner	
12	(Czechoslovakia) Jozef Žídek	
13	(West Germany) Klaus Grimmelt	
14	(Austria) Josef Schneider	
15	(Hungary) László Vajda	
16	(Italy) Stefano Bargauan	
17	(Sweden) Thomas Callerud	
18	(Romania) György Fazekas	
19	(Finland) Pekka Leskinen	
20	(Switzerland) Bernard Bauer	
21	(Socialist Federal Republic of Yugoslavia) Zoran Matas	
22	(Czechoslovakia) Zdeněk Pazdírek	

=== Ladies ===
Rank	Name	Places
1	(Austria) Beatrix Schuba	
2	(Hungary) Zsuzsa Almássy	22
3	(Italy) Rita Trapanese	
4	(East Germany) Sonja Morgenstern	
5	(Switzerland) Charlotte Walter	
6	(United Kingdom) Patricia Dodd	
7	(East Germany) Christine Errath	
8	(Soviet Union) Yelena Aleksandrova	
9	(West Germany) Eileen Zillmer	
10	(Czechoslovakia) Ľudmila Bezáková	
11	(United Kingdom) Jean Scott	
12	(Soviet Union) Marina Titova	
13	(West Germany) Judith Beyer	
14	(Czechoslovakia) Liana Drahová	
15	(Sweden) Anita Johansson	
16	(Italy) Cinzia Frosio	
17	(Romania) Beatrice Huștiu	
18	(Austria) Sonja Balun	
19	(Netherlands) Dianne de Leeuw	
20	(France) Marie-Claude Bierre	
21	(Denmark) Kirsten Frikke	
22	(Socialist Federal Republic of Yugoslavia) Helena Gazvoda	

=== Pairs ===
Rank	Name	Places
1	(Soviet Union) Irina Rodnina / Aleksey Ulanov	
2	(Soviet Union) Lyudmila Smirnova / Andrey Suraykin	
3	(Soviet Union) Galina Karelina / Georgiy Proskurin	
4	(East Germany) Manuela Groß / Uwe Kagelmann	
5	(West Germany) Almut Lehmann / Herbert Wiesinger	
6	(East Germany) Marlies Radunsky / Rolf Österreich	
7	(West Germany) Brunhilde Baßler / Eberhard Rausch	
8	(Poland) Grażyna Osmańska / Adam Brodecki	
9	(United Kingdom) Linda Connolly / Colin Taylforth	
10	(France) Florence Cahn / Jean-Roland Racle	
11	(Czechoslovakia) Dana Fialová / Josef Tůma	
12	(Switzerland) Karin Künzle / Christian Künzle	
13	(Poland) Teresa Skrzek / Piotr Szczypa	
14	(Austria) Evelyne Schneider / Wilhelm Bietak	
15	(Socialist Federal Republic of Yugoslavia) Helena Gazvoda / Silvo Švejger	

=== Ice dance ===
Rank	Name	Places
1	(Soviet Union) Lyudmila Pakhomova / Aleksandr Gorshkov	
2	(West Germany) Angelika Buck / Erich Buck	
3	(United Kingdom) Susan Getty / Roy Bradshaw	
4	(Soviet Union) Tetyana Voytyuk / Vyacheslav Zhyhalyn	
5	(United Kingdom) Janet Sawbridge / Peter Dalby	
6	(Soviet Union) Yelena Zharkova / Gennadiy Karponosov	
7	(United Kingdom) Hilary Green / Glynn Watts	
8	(Czechoslovakia) Diana Skotnická / Martin Skotnický	
9	(Poland) Teresa Weyna / Piotr Bojańczyk	
10	(Hungary) Ilona Berecz / István Sugár	
11	(France) Anne-Claude Wolfers / Roland Mars	
12	(Italy) Matilde Ciccia / Lamberto Ceserani	
13	(West Germany) Astrid Kopp / Axel Kopp	
14	(Hungary) Krisztina Regőczy / András Sallay	
15	(Switzerland) Tatiana Grossen / Alessandro Grossen	
16	(West Germany) Sylvia Fuchs / Michael Fuchs	
17	(Poland) Ewa Kołodziej / Tadeusz Góra	
18	(France) Brigitte Ydrault / Pascal Germe	
19	(Austria) Agnes Arco / Adrian Perco	
20	(Denmark) Vivi Poulsen / Kurt Poulsen	

== Sources ==
- "Europeans", Skating magazine, Apr 1971
