= 1970 European Figure Skating Championships =

Figure skating competition

1970 European Championships
- Type: ISU Championship
- Date: February 4 – 8
- Season: 1969-70
- Location: Leningrad, Russia, Soviet Union
- Venue: Jubilee Sports Complex

Champions
- Men's singles: (Czechoslovakia) Ondrej Nepela
- Ladies' singles: (East Germany) Gabriele Seyfert
- Pairs: (Soviet Union) Irina Rodnina / Aleksey Ulanov
- Ice dance: (Soviet Union) Lyudmila Pakhomova / Aleksandr Gorshkov
- Previous: 1969 European Championships
- Next: 1971 European Championships

The 1970 European Figure Skating Championships was a senior-level international competition held at the Jubilee Sports Complex in Leningrad, Soviet Union from February 4 to 8, 1970. Elite senior-level figure skaters from European ISU member nations competed for the title of European Champion in the disciplines of men's singles, ladies' singles, pair skating, and ice dancing.

== Results ==
=== Men ===
Rank	Name	Places
1	(Czechoslovakia) Ondrej Nepela	
2	(France) Patrick Péra	
3	(East Germany) Günter Zöller	
4	(Soviet Union) Sergey Chetverukhin	
5	(Soviet Union) Sergey Volkov	
6	(United Kingdom) Haig Oundjian	
7	(Soviet Union) Yuriy Ovchinnikov	
8	(Austria) Günter Anderl	
9	(East Germany) Jan Hoffmann	
10	(Switzerland) Daniel Höner	
11	(France) Jacques Mrozek	
12	(United Kingdom) John Curry	
13	(East Germany) Ralf Richter	
14	(West Germany) Klaus Grimmelt	
15	(Czechoslovakia) Zdeněk Pazdírek	
16	(Czechoslovakia) Jozef Žídek	
17	(Hungary) László Vajda	
18	(Italy) Stefano Bargauan	
19	(France) Didier Gailhaguet	
20	(Sweden) Thomas Callerud	
21	(Poland) Piotr Roszko	
22	(Romania) György Fazekas	
23	(Socialist Federal Republic of Yugoslavia) Zoran Matas	

=== Ladies ===
Rank	Name	Places
1	(East Germany) Gabriele Seyfert	
2	(Austria) Beatrix Schuba	
3	(Hungary) Zsuzsa Almássy	23
4	(Italy) Rita Trapanese	
5	(Austria) Elisabeth Nestler	
6	(United Kingdom) Patricia Dodd	
7	(Soviet Union) Yelena Aleksandrova	
8	(Czechoslovakia) Ľudmila Bezáková	
9	(East Germany) Sonja Morgenstern	
10	(West Germany) Eileen Zillmer	
11	(Switzerland) Charlotte Walter	
12	(Soviet Union) Alla Korneva	
13	(United Kingdom) Frances Waghorn	
14	(Czechoslovakia) Liana Drahová	
15	(East Germany) Simone Gräfe	
16	(Italy) Cinzia Frosio	
17	(Netherlands) Lia Does	
18	(West Germany) Marion von Cetto	
19	(Hungary) Zsófia Wagner	
20	(Poland) Mirosława Nowak	
21	(Sweden) Anita Johansson	
22	(Romania) Beatrice Huștiu	
WD	(France) Joëlle Cartaux	DNS

=== Pairs ===
Rank	Name	Places
1	(Soviet Union) Irina Rodnina / Aleksey Ulanov	
2	(Soviet Union) Lyudmila Smirnova / Andrey Suraykin	
3	(East Germany) Heidemarie Walther / Heinz-Ulrich Walther	
4	(Soviet Union) Galina Karelina / Georgiy Proskurin	
5	(West Germany) Almut Lehmann / Herbert Wiesinger	
6	(East Germany) Annette Kansy / Axel Salzmann	
7	(East Germany) Manuela Groß / Uwe Kagelmann	
8	(West Germany) Brunhilde Baßler / Eberhard Rausch	
9	(Poland) Janina Poremska / Piotr Szczypa	
10	(Czechoslovakia) Dana Fialová / Josef Tůma	
11	(France) Monique Szabo / Pierre Szabo	
12	(Poland) Grażyna Osmańska / Adam Brodecki	
13	(Austria) Evelyne Schneider / Wilhelm Bietak	
14	(Switzerland) Karin Künzle / Christian Künzle	
15	(Hungary) Éva Farkas / Tamas Korpás	

=== Ice dance ===
Rank	Name	Places
1	(Soviet Union) Lyudmila Pakhomova / Aleksandr Gorshkov	
2	(West Germany) Angelika Buck / Erich Buck	
3	(Soviet Union) Tetyana Voytyuk / Vyacheslav Zhyhalyn	
4	(East Germany) Annerose Baier / Eberhard Rüger	
5	(United Kingdom) Susan Getty / Roy Bradshaw	
6	(Soviet Union) Yelena Zharkova / Gennadiy Karponosov	
7	(United Kingdom) Hilary Green / Glynn Watts	
8	(Hungary) Ilona Berecz / István Sugár	
9	(Poland) Teresa Weyna / Piotr Bojańczyk	
10	(France) Elisabeth Bugiel / Michel Bouttier	
11	(Italy) Matilde Ciccia / Lamberto Ceserani	
12	(West Germany) Astrid Kopp / Axel Kopp	
13	(Hungary) Krisztina Regőczy / András Sallay	
14	(Czechoslovakia) Světlana Marinovová / Miloš Buršík	
15	(Czechoslovakia) Eva Sklenská / Jan Gřešek	
16	(Switzerland) Tatiana Grossen / Alessandro Grossen	
