= 1973 World Figure Skating Championships =

Annual figure skating competition held in 1973

- Type: ISU Championship
- Date: February 26 – March 3
- Season: 1972–73
- Location: Bratislava, Slovakia, Czechoslovakia
- Venue: Zimni Stadion Bratislava

Champions
- Men's singles: (Czechoslovakia) Ondrej Nepela
- Ladies' singles: (Canada) Karen Magnussen
- Pairs: (Soviet Union) Irina Rodnina / Aleksandr Zaytsev
- Ice dance: (Soviet Union) Lyudmila Pakhomova / Aleksandr Gorshkov
- Previous: 1972 World Championships
- Next: 1974 World Championships

The 1973 World Figure Skating Championships were held from February 26 to March 3 in Bratislava, Czechoslovakia, sanctioned by the International Skating Union. Medals were awarded in men's singles, ladies' singles, pair skating, and ice dance. It was the last year in which solid gold medals were awarded in figure skating.

The opening ceremony was held at the Philharmonic of Bratislava. The Chairman of the organising committee was Miroslav Červenka. In the ladies' single skating withdrew before the opening ceremony Sonja Balun from Austria and Zsuzsa Homolya from Hungary.

Irina Rodnina won her first World title with her new partner, Aleksandr Zaytsev after her previous partner, Aleksey Ulanov, chose to skate with Lyudmila Smirnova. Rodnina/Zaitsev's music stopped during their short program, possibly due to a Czech worker acting in retaliation for the suppression of the Prague Spring.

== Medal table ==
* Host nation (Czechoslovakia)

Rank	Nation	Gold	Silver	Bronze	Total
1	Soviet Union	2	2	0	4
2	Canada	1	0	0	1
2	Czechoslovakia*	1	0	0	1
4	United States	0	1	0	1
4	West Germany	0	1	0	1
6	East Germany	0	0	3	3
7	Great Britain	0	0	1	1
Totals (7 entries)		4	4	4	12

== Results ==
=== Men ===
Rank	Name	CP	SP	FP	Points	Places
1	(Czechoslovakia) Ondrej Nepela	1	2	2	355.66	10
2	(Soviet Union) Sergey Chetverukhin	2	3	1	348.91	17
3	(East Germany) Jan Hoffmann	3	7	6	340.55	35
4	(United Kingdom) John Curry	4	8	7	338.43	39
5	(Canada) Toller Cranston	6	1	5	336.50	54
6	(Soviet Union) Yuriy Ovchinnikov	8	5	3	334.01	54
7	(United States) Gordon McKellen	5	4	8	330.84	61
8	(Canada) Ronald Shaver	12	6	4	330.58	62
9	(France) Jacques Mrozek	9	10	11	320.01	91
10	(Czechoslovakia) Zdeněk Pazdírek	10	12	9	319.43	95
11	(Switzerland) Daniel Höner	7	11	12	319.08	97
12	(United States) Robert Bradshaw	13	9	10	316.62	103
13	(Hungary) László Vajda	11	14	13	314.77	112
14	(Japan) Minoru Sano	14	13	14	308.37	130
15	(West Germany) Erich Reifschneider	15	15	16	303.72	144
16	(Soviet Union) Igor Lisovskiy	18	17	17	302.24	147
17	(East Germany) Bernd Wunderlich	20	18	15	300.38	148
18	(Czechoslovakia) Miroslav Šoška	17	16	18	299.99	151
19	(Canada) Robert Rubens	19	19	19	295.16	168
20	(Austria) Günther Hilgarth	16	20	21	275.29	187
21	(Poland) Jacek Tascher	23	23	20	273.30	191
22	(Italy) Rolando Bragaglia	22	21	22	270.19	193
23	(Romania) György Fazekas	21	24	24	262.23	205
24	(Socialist Federal Republic of Yugoslavia) Silvo Švejger	24	22	23	255.29	214

- Referee: (Italy) Sonia Bianchetti
- Assistant Referee: (Czechoslovakia) Miroslav Hasenöhrl

Judges:

- (Soviet Union) Boris Lvov-Anokhin Львов-Анохин, Борис Александрович
- (Italy) Luciana Brasa
- (East Germany) Walburga Grimm
- (Canada) Dorothy Leamen
- (United States) Ramona McIntyre
- (Romania) Irina Minculescu
- (Japan) Kazuo Ōhashi
- (Czechoslovakia) Dagmar Řeháková
- (Switzerland) Jürg Wilhelm (substitute)
- (United Kingdom) Geoffrey Yates

=== Ladies ===
Rank	Name	CP	SP	FP	Points	Places
1	(Canada) Karen Magnussen	1	1	2	356.39	9
2	(United States) Janet Lynn	2	12	1	347.85	18
3	(East Germany) Christine Errath	5	2	5	340.90	31
4	(United States) Dorothy Hamill	8	3	4	337.93	35
5	(United Kingdom) Jean Scott	4	10	11	332.10	47
6	(Switzerland) Karin Iten	3	14	14	329.08	60
7	(Czechoslovakia) Liana Drahová	9	9	6	327.53	69
8	(East Germany) Sonja Morgenstern	10	5	7	326.53	76
9	(United States) Juli McKinstry	12	7	9	323.26	78
10	(Canada) Lynn Nightingale	15	4	3	325.61	91
11	(United Kingdom) Maria McLean	7	11	13	322.68	96
12	(Canada) Cathy Irwin	11	13	10	320.95	108
13	(West Germany) Gerti Schanderl	14	6	8	319.69	114
14	(East Germany) Anett Pötzsch	13	8	12	316.21	123
15	(Netherlands) Dianne de Leeuw	6	15	16	316.11	125
16	(Soviet Union) Marina Sanaya	23	16	15	296.67	149
17	(Japan) Emi Watanabe	18	23	17	294.35	154
18	(France) Marie-Claude Bierre	16	18	22	288.34	171
19	(Italy) Cinzia Frosio	19	19	19	287.45	175
20	(Sweden) Lise-Lotte Öberg	21	17	18	285.55	177
21	(Australia) Sharon Burley	20	20	21	286.58	178
22	(Finland) Hannele Koskinen	27	22	20	275.77	201
23	(Poland) Grażyna Dudek	26	21	23	276.57	204
24	(Socialist Federal Republic of Yugoslavia) Helena Gazvoda	25	26	24	268.04	220
25	(South Korea) Chang Myung-su	17	28	27	264.92	227
26	(Norway) Bente Tverran	24	27	26	261.03	231
27	(Hungary) Ágnes Erős	28	24	25	262.58	235
WD	(Austria) Susanne Altura	22	25			DNF

- Referee: (Czechoslovakia) Josef Dědič
- Assistant Referee: (Austria) Oskar Madl

Judges:

- (Switzerland) Jakob Biedermann
- (Netherlands) Elsbeth Bon
- (Australia) Sydney R. Croll (substitute)
- (Austria) Ludwig Gassner
- (Hungary) Márta Mesterházi-Nagy, Mrs. Léces Hungarian names#Married names
- (United Kingdom) Vera Lynfield
- (Canada) Joan Maclagan
- (Finland) Inkeri Soininen
- (East Germany) Helga Wiecki
- (United States) Mary Wright

=== Pairs ===
Rank	Name	SP	FP	Points	Places
1	(Soviet Union) Irina Rodnina / Aleksandr Zaytsev	1	1	423.9	9
2	(Soviet Union) Lyudmila Smirnova / Aleksey Ulanov	2	2	416.2	18
3	(East Germany) Manuela Groß / Uwe Kagelmann	3	3	409.2	29
4	(West Germany) Almut Lehmann / Herbert Wiesinger	6	5	402.9	43
5	(East Germany) Romy Kermer / Rolf Österreich	4	4	401.3	46
6	(Canada) Sandra Bezic / Val Bezic	7	6	399.8	51
7	(Soviet Union) Irina Chernyayeva / Vasiliy Blagov	5	7	398.3	56
8	(United States) Melissa Militano / Mark Militano	8	8	390.7	73
9	(Canada) Marian Murray / Glenn Moore	9	9	386.0	80
10	(Switzerland) Karin Künzle / Christian Künzle	11	10	373.9	92
11	(Czechoslovakia) Ilona Urbanová / Aleš Zach	10	11	369.4	106
12	(West Germany) Corinna Halke / Eberhard Rausch	12	12	366.6	108
13	(United States) Gale Fuhrman / Joel Fuhrman	15	13	360.9	120
14	(France) Florence Cahn / Jean-Roland Racle	13	14	362.0	121
15	(Austria) Ursula Nemec / Michael Nemec	16	15	346.0	135
16	(Poland) Teresa Skrzek / Piotr Szczypa	14	16	350.4	137

- Referee: (Switzerland) Karl Enderlin
- Assistant Referee: (Canada) Donald Gilchrist

Judges:

- (France) Monique Georgelin (substitute)
- (East Germany) Walburga Grimm
- (Austria) Walter Hüttner
- (Poland) Władysław Kołodziej
- (Canada) Alice Pinos
- (Soviet Union) Valentin Piseyev
- (United States) Edith M. Shoemaker
- (Czechoslovakia) Erich Soukup
- (West Germany) Willi Wernz
- (Switzerland) Jürg Wilhelm

=== Ice dance ===
Rank	Name	CD	FD	Points	Places
1	(Soviet Union) Lyudmila Pakhomova / Aleksandr Gorshkov	1	1	524.20	9
2	(West Germany) Angelika Buck / Erich Buck	2	2	514.55	18
3	(United Kingdom) Hilary Green / Glynn Watts	3	3	499.05	29
4	(United Kingdom) Janet Sawbridge / Peter Dalby	4	6	493.25	38
5	(Soviet Union) Tetyana Voytyuk / Vyacheslav Zhyhalyn	5	4	488.30	43
6	(United States) Mary Campbell / Johnny Johns	6	7	479.30	60
7	(Soviet Union) Irina Moiseyeva / Andrey Minenkov	7	5	475.80	63.5
8	(Czechoslovakia) Diana Skotnická / Martin Skotnický	8	8	470.85	72.5
9	(Canada) Louise Soper / Barry Soper	9	9	471.00	73
10	(United States) Anne Millier / Harvey Millier	10	11	459.15	93
11	(Italy) Matilde Ciccia / Lamberto Ceserani	12	10	452.10	100
12	(United Kingdom) Rosalind Druce / David Barker	11	13	448.70	107
13	(Hungary) Krisztina Regőczy / András Sallay	13	12	442.70	115
14	(Poland) Halina Gordon / Wojciech Bańkowski	14	15	425.80	130
15	(Canada) Barbara Berezowski / David Porter	15	14	426.35	131
16	(France) Anne-Claude Wolfers / Roland Mars	16	16	408.80	146
17	(West Germany) Christina Henke / Udo Dönsdorf	17	17	402.00	151
18	(Austria) Brigitte Scheijbal / Walter Leschetizky	18	18	393.65	160

- Referee: (West Germany) Hermann Schiechtl
- Assistant Referee: (United Kingdom) Lawrence Demmy

Judges:

- (Soviet Union) Irina Absalyamova
- (Italy) Cia Benacchi-Bordogna (substitute)
- (Canada) Frances Gunn
- (France) Lysiane Lauret
- (Czechoslovakia) Helena Pachlová
- (United Kingdom) Mollie Phillips
- (Hungary) Elek Riedl
- (West Germany) Eugen Romminger
- (United States) Edith M. Shoemaker
- (Poland) Maria Zuchowicz
