= 1973 European Figure Skating Championships =

Figure skating competition

1973 European Championships
- Type: ISU Championship
- Date: February 6 – 11
- Season: 1972-73
- Location: Cologne, West Germany
- Venue: Kölner Eissporthalle

Champions
- Men's singles: (Czechoslovakia) Ondrej Nepela
- Ladies' singles: (East Germany) Christine Errath
- Pairs: (Soviet Union) Irina Rodnina / Aleksandr Zaytsev
- Ice dance: (Soviet Union) Lyudmila Pakhomova / Aleksandr Gorshkov
- Previous: 1972 European Championships
- Next: 1974 European Championships

The 1973 European Figure Skating Championships was a senior-level international competition held in Cologne, West Germany from February 6 to 11, 1973. Elite senior-level figure skaters from European ISU member nations competed for the title of European Champion in the disciplines of men's singles, ladies' singles, pair skating, and ice dancing.

== Results ==
=== Men ===
Rank	Name	CP	SP	FS	Points	Places
1	(Czechoslovakia) Ondrej Nepela	1	2	4	347.65	12
2	(Soviet Union) Sergey Chetverukhin	4	1	3	341.54	20
3	(East Germany) Jan Hoffmann	3	3	2	344.24	22
4	(United Kingdom) John Curry			5		
5	(Soviet Union) Sergey Volkov	2		6		
6	(Soviet Union) Yuriy Ovchinnikov			1		
7	(Hungary) László Vajda					
8	(France) Jacques Mrozek					
9	(Switzerland) Daniel Höner					
10	(Czechoslovakia) Zdeněk Pazdírek					
11	(Czechoslovakia) František Pechar					
12	(West Germany) Erich Reifschneider					
13	(Austria) Günther Hilgarth					
14	(United Kingdom) Michael Fish					
15	(United Kingdom) Robin Cousins	18	14	13		
16	(Poland) Jacek Tascher					
17	(Italy) Rolando Bragaglia					
18	(Romania) György Fazekas					
19	(Netherlands) Rob Ouwerkerk					
20	(Socialist Federal Republic of Yugoslavia) Silvo Švejger					

=== Ladies ===
Rank	Name	Places
1	(East Germany) Christine Errath	
2	(United Kingdom) Jean Scott	
3	(Switzerland) Karin Iten	
4	(Czechoslovakia) Liana Drahová	
5	(West Germany) Gerti Schanderl	
6	(Netherlands) Dianne de Leeuw	
7	(United Kingdom) Maria McLean	
8	(East Germany) Anett Pötzsch	
9	(Italy) Cinzia Frosio	
10	(Austria) Sonja Balun	
11	(Soviet Union) Marina Sanaya	
12	(France) Marie-Claude Bierre	
13	(Austria) Susanne Altura	
14	(Soviet Union) Tatyana Oleneva	
15	(Sweden) Lise-Lotte Öberg	
16	(Socialist Federal Republic of Yugoslavia) Helena Gazvoda	
17	(Italy) Manuela Bertelè	
18	(Finland) Tarja Näsi	
19	(Netherlands) Sophie Verlaan	
20	(Poland) Urszula Zielińska	
21	(Hungary) Ágnes Erős	
22	(Denmark) Hanne Jensen	
WD	(Switzerland) Donna Walter	DNS

=== Pairs ===
Rank	Name	Places
1	(Soviet Union) Irina Rodnina / Aleksandr Zaytsev	
2	(Soviet Union) Lyudmila Smirnova / Aleksey Ulanov	
3	(West Germany) Almut Lehmann / Herbert Wiesinger	
4	(East Germany) Manuela Groß / Uwe Kagelmann	
5	(Soviet Union) Irina Chernyayeva / Vasiliy Blagov	
6	(East Germany) Romy Kermer / Rolf Österreich	
7	(Switzerland) Karin Künzle / Christian Künzle	
8	(France) Florence Cahn / Jean-Roland Racle	
9	(Austria) Ursula Nemec / Michael Nemec	
10	(Poland) Teresa Skrzek / Piotr Szczypa	
11	(West Germany) Corinna Halke / Eberhard Rausch	
12	(Czechoslovakia) Ilona Urbanová / Aleš Zach	

=== Ice dance ===
Rank	Name	Places
1	(Soviet Union) Lyudmila Pakhomova / Aleksandr Gorshkov	
2	(West Germany) Angelika Buck / Erich Buck	
3	(United Kingdom) Hilary Green / Glynn Watts	
4	(United Kingdom) Janet Sawbridge / Peter Dalby	
5	(Soviet Union) Tetyana Voytyuk / Vyacheslav Zhyhalyn	
6	(Czechoslovakia) Diana Skotnická / Martin Skotnický	
7	(Soviet Union) Irina Moiseyeva / Andrey Minenkov	
8	(Italy) Matilde Ciccia / Lamberto Ceserani	
9	(United Kingdom) Rosalind Druce / David Barker	
10	(Hungary) Krisztina Regőczy / András Sallay	
11	(France) Anne-Claude Wolfers / Roland Mars	
12	(Poland) Teresa Weyna / Piotr Bojańczyk	
13	(West Germany) Sylvia Fuchs / Michael Fuchs	
14	(West Germany) Astrid Kopp / Axel Kopp	
15	(Poland) Ewa Kołodziej / Tadeusz Góra	
16	(Switzerland) Gerda Bühler / Mathis Bächi	
17	(France) Claude Couste / Eric Couste	
