= Tamara Moskvina =

Russian pair skating coach (born 1941)

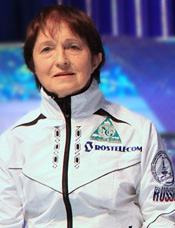
- Moskvina in 2009

Personal information
- Full name: Tamara Nikolayevna Moskvina
- Other names: Tamara Nikolayevna Bratus
- Born: 26 June 1941 (age 85) Leningrad, Russian SFSR, Soviet Union
- Height: 4 ft 10 in (147 cm)

Figure skating career
- Country: Soviet Union
- Began skating: 1951
- Retired: 1969
Medal record
Representing Soviet Union
Figure skating: Pairs
World Championships
Silver medal – second place	1969 Colorado Springs	Pairs
European Championships
Silver medal – second place	1968 Västerås	Pairs
Bronze medal – third place	1969 Garmisch-Partenkirchen	Pairs

Tamara Nikolayevna Moskvina (Russian: Тамара Николаевна Москвина, née Bratus, Братусь; born 26 June 1941) is a Soviet and Russian pair skating coach and former competitive skater. Competing in pairs with Alexei Mishin, she became the 1969 World silver medalist and Soviet national champion.

As a singles skater, she was a five-time (1962–1966) Soviet national champion. She later became a successful coach, leading at least one pair to an Olympic medal in six consecutive Winter Olympics from 1984 to 2002 and twice coaching the gold and silver medal-winning pairs, in 1992 and 1998. Married to Igor Moskvin, Moskvina is based in Saint Petersburg, Russia.

== Early life ==
Tamara Nikolayevna Bratus was born 26 June 1941 in Leningrad (now Saint Petersburg), the daughter of Serafima and Nikolay Bratus. She had two sisters. During the Siege of Leningrad in World War II, her family evacuated to a small village in the Ural Mountains where her mother had relatives. Moskvina grew to only 4 feet 10 inches (1.47 m) due to childhood malnutrition during the war years. The family returned to Leningrad in 1948. Her father, from Kyiv, died suddenly at the age of 47.

== Career ==
=== As a skater ===
Moskvina began skating in Leningrad at the age of 10, after her father obtained used skates for his daughters. Ivan Bogoyavlensky was her first coach. She practiced at the Iskra and Dinamo rinks, the latter of which was on a tennis court. Igor Moskvin became her coach in 1957. She moved to an ice rink on Vasilyevsky Island which opened in 1958 after conversion from an abandoned church.

Moskvina became the Soviet national ladies' champion for the first time in 1962 and would win the title four more times. Her best finish at an international competition in singles was 14th at the 1965 European Championships. Moskvina may have been the first to perform what is now called a Biellmann spin. She was inspired after seeing a gymnastics competition and began attempting it on the ice. She included the spin at the 1960 European Championships.

At Moskvin's suggestion, she decided to try pair skating. As he later explained, the leading women's coach in those years was Tatyana Tolmachova, who worked in Moscow and led a group of girls of the same age as Moskvina. Tatyana's husband, Alexander Tolmachev, headed the Figure Skating Federation of Moscow, so Moskvina, who did not train under Tolmachova, had little chance to stay in the team. Her first partner was Alexander Gavrilov, with whom she won the 1965 Soviet national title. He retired at the end of the season.

Later in 1965, Moskvina teamed up with Alexei Mishin, whom she had trained alongside when they were both singles skaters. They won bronze at the 1966 Winter Universiade and were sent to their first European and World Championships in 1967. Yubileyny Sports Palace became their training site after its opening in 1967.

Moskvina/Mishin won silver at the 1968 European Championships. The following season, they defeated both the two-time Olympic gold medallists, Ludmila Belousova/Oleg Protopopov, and the future champions, Irina Rodnina/Alexei Ulanov, to win the Soviet national title. Moskvina/Mishin took bronze at the 1969 European Championships and then silver at the 1969 World Championships. Moskvina decided to retire from competition in 1969 to start a family.

=== As a coach ===
Moskvina became interested in a coaching career during her competitive years. She earned her doctorate in educational psychology from the Leningrad Academy of Physical Culture.

Moskvina has coached at the Yubileyny Sports Palace in Saint Petersburg, Russia, for almost her entire career. She was one of the first Soviet coaches to collaborate with the skating world outside the Soviet Union and its satellites. She contributed a report on the 1970 European Championships to Skating Magazine, an American publication, which at that time required clearance through the central news agency in the Soviet Union. She co-authored the International Skating Union's judging handbook for pair skating in 1984. During the 1990s, Yubileyny suffered from poor-quality ice and other problems, resulting in limited training time even for top skaters.

In 1998, Moskvina and her students spent some time at the Stamford Twin Rinks in Stamford, Connecticut. In 1999, Moskvina moved to Hackensack, New Jersey's Ice House and spent several years coaching there. In 2001–2002, she returned to Yubileyny where she continues to coach. Since 2017 she has been working at the Ice Arena skating rink in St. Petersburg

In the 2026–27 season, Moskvina is coaching the following pairs:

- Anastasia Mishina / Aleksandr Galliamov (since 2020) – 2022 two-time Olympic bronze medalists, 2021 World champions, 2022, 2024 y 2025 Russian champions, 2021 Rostelecom Cup and NHK Trophy champions.

Moskvina coached the following pairs:

- Irina Vorobieva/Alexander Vlassov – 1977 World & European silver medalists, 1976 World & European bronze medalists.
- Irina Vorobieva/Igor Lisovsky – 1981 World and European champions. She coached Vorobieva from age ten.
- Elena Valova/Oleg Vasiliev – 1984 Olympic champions, 1988 Olympic silver medalists, and 1983, 1985, & 1988 World champions. She first worked with Vasiliev when he was twelve.
- Natalia Mishkutenok/Artur Dmitriev – 1992 Olympic champions, 1994 Olympic silver medalists, and 1991 & 1992 World champions.
- Elena Bechke/Denis Petrov – 1992 Olympic silver medalists, 1989 World bronze medalists, two-time European silver medalists.
- Oksana Kazakova/Artur Dmitriev – 1998 Olympic champions and 1996 European champions.
- Elena Berezhnaya/Anton Sikharulidze – 2002 Olympic champions, 1998 Olympic silver medalists, and 1998 & 1999 World champions.
- Yuko Kawaguchi/Alexander Markuntsov – 2001 World Junior silver medalist.
- Kyoko Ina/John Zimmerman – Three-time U.S. champions and 2002 World bronze medalists.
- Julia Obertas/Sergei Slavnov – 2005 European silver medalists.
- Yuko Kavaguti/Alexander Smirnov – 2009 & 2010 World bronze medalists, 2010 & 2015 European champions, 2008, 2009 & 2010 Russian national champions.
- Alisa Efimova/Alexander Korovin – 2019 Universiade champions, 2018 Skate America silver medalists.
- Yasmina Kadyrova / Ivan Balchenko – 2021 Rostelecom Cup bronze medalists.
- Aleksandra Boikova / Dmitrii Kozlovskii – 2021 World bronze medalists, 2020 European champions, 2020, 2023 Russian champions and 2019, 2021, 2022 prize-winners, 2019 European bronze medalists, 2019 Skate Canada and Rostelecom Cup champions, 2021 Internationaux de France champions.
- Yasmina Kadyrova / Valerii Kolesov – Three-time Russian Grand Prix stages prize-winners.

Moskvina coached some pairs in collaboration with her husband, Igor Moskvin (Kyoko Ina/John Zimmerman), and some with former students Artur Dmitriev and Oksana Kazakova. Her pairs have worked with various choreographers, including Alexander Matveev, Tatiana Druchinina (until 2011), Valeri Pecherski, Igor Bobrin, and Peter Tchernyshev. Former student Oleg Vasiliev coached Tatiana Totmianina/Maxim Marinin to an Olympic gold medal after Moskvina sent them to him.

During her own skating career, both in singles and in pairs, Moskvina was known for including unusual flexibility moves in her programs. She has passed this on in the choreography for the various pair teams she has coached, inventing many unique pair skating elements in which the man and woman, although performing different movements, still work together as a unit. This style of choreography is sometimes referred to as "opposition choreography," as opposed to shadow or mirror skating, when the two partners perform similar movements in unison together.

In 2011, Moskvina said she planned to retire after the 2014 Olympics but would continue to advise pairs in addition to writing a book on her coaching experiences. But she continued to work as a coach. In 2021, Moskvina said about similar plans after the 2022 Olympics, but continues to coach skaters in the 2022–23 season.

==== Tamara Moskvina Figure Skating Club ====
In March 2017, the Tamara Moskvina Figure Skating Club opened in St. Petersburg. Moskvina is the head of the club and the pair skating coach. In the club there are coaches of pair and single skating Artur Minchuk, Oleg Vasiliev, Veronika Daineko, Alexander Ustinov, Dmitri Khromin, choreographers Alexander Stepin, Nikolai Moroshkin, figure skaters Anastasia Mishina/Aleksandr Galliamov (since 2020), Aleksandra Boikova/Dmitrii Kozlovskii, Petr Gumennik and others. Since 2019, Moskvina has been a consultant to Petr Gumennik. In 2020, Oleg Vasiliev left the Moskvina club. He became the head coach of the Belarusian national team. Alexander Stepin died on February 11, 2021. Since 2021, the choreographer of the Mariinsky Theatre Dmitry Pimonov has been working with figure skaters of the Moskvina club, for example, Petr Gumennik.

According to the coach Veronika Daineko, Moskvina comes to trainings of the single skating group. She gives advice on programs, choreography, presentation. After the Russian championship 2022, Petr Gumennik said that Moskvina works with him and the pair skaters.

== Personal life ==
Tamara Nikolayevna Bratus married Igor Moskvin in 1964. Moskvin died on November 10, 2020. They have two daughters, Olga Igorevna Moskvina (born 12 April 1970), a linguist, and Anna Igorevna Moskvina (born 14 June 1974), an economist who graduated from Columbia University (NYC).

== Competitive highlights ==
=== Pair skating with Mishin ===
International
Event	1965–66	1966–67	1967–68	1968–69
Winter Olympics			5th	
World Championships		6th	4th	2nd
European Championships		6th	2nd	3rd
Prize of Moscow News		1st		1st
Winter Universiade	3rd			
National
Soviet Championships	3rd	2nd	2nd	1st

=== Pair skating with Gavrilov ===
National
Event	1965
Soviet Championships	1st

=== Single skating ===
International
Event	1959	1960	1961	1962	1963	1964	1965	1966
European Championships		27th		19th	20th		14th	
National
Soviet Championships	9th	2nd	2nd	1st	1st	1st	1st	1st

== Awards ==
Moskvina was inducted into the World Figure Skating Hall of Fame in 2005.

- Order of Merit for the Fatherland, 3rd class (27 February 1998) - for outstanding athletic achievement at the XVIII Olympic Winter Games in 1998
- Order of the Red Banner of Labour (1984)
- Order of Friendship of Peoples (1988)
- Honoured Artist of the RSFSR (22 April 1994) - for services in the development of physical culture and sports and the great personal contribution to the preparation and conduct of XVII Winter Olympic Games in 1994
- Honoured Worker of Physical Culture of the Russian Federation (2002)
- Honoured Master of Sports of the USSR (1969)
- Honoured coach of the USSR
- Honoured Coach of Russia
- Gratitude of the President of the Russian Federation (5 May 2003) - for the successful preparation of athletes and high achievements in sports at the Games XIX Olympic Games in Salt Lake City
- Honorary citizen of St. Petersburg
- Best in sports in St. Petersburg (St. Petersburg Government, 2 February 2010)
- Honorary Diploma from the Legislative Assembly of Saint Petersburg (2002)
