= Raymond Wilson =

Raymond Wilson may refer to:

- Raymond Wilson (physicist) (1928–2018), who developed the concept of active optics
- Raymond Wilson (figure skater) (1944–?), British Olympic figure skater

== See also ==
- Ray Wilson (disambiguation)
