= Bietak =

Bietak is a surname. Notable people with the surname include:

- Manfred Bietak (born 1940), Austrian archaeologist and professor
- Wilhelm Bietak (born 1947), Austrian pair skater and skating event producer
