= Alexei Mishin =

Russian figure skating coach and former pair skater

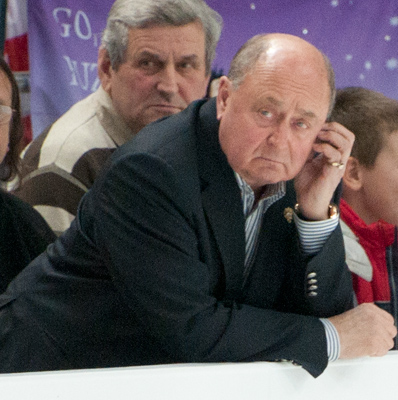
- Mishin in 2011

Personal information
- Full name: Alexei Nikolayevich Mishin
- Born: 8 March 1941 (age 85) Sevastopol, Russian SFSR, Soviet Union

Figure skating career
- Country: Soviet Union
- Began skating: 1956
- Retired: 1969
Medal record
Representing Soviet Union
Pairs' Figure skating
World Championships
Silver medal – second place	1969 Colorado Springs	Pairs
European Championships
Bronze medal – third place	1969 Garmisch-Partenkirchen	Pairs
Silver medal – second place	1968 Västerås	Pairs

Alexei Nikolayevich Mishin (Russian: Алексей Николаевич Мишин; born 8 March 1941) is a Russian figure skating coach and former pair skater. With partner Tamara Moskvina, he is the 1969 World silver medalist and Soviet national champion.

Mishin is based in Saint Petersburg at Yubileyny Sports Palace. His former students include Olympic champions Alexei Urmanov, Alexei Yagudin, and Evgeni Plushenko. Mishin also runs summer seminars. Among the skaters who have attended those are Stéphane Lambiel and Sarah Meier. He has written several books on the biomechanics of figure skating.

== Early years ==
Born in Sevastopol, Mishin spent his childhood in Tbilisi and later moved to Leningrad with his family. He was interested in mechanics from an early age. He started skating relatively late, at age 15, after his parents brought him to the rink. His father skated with him to get him interested in the activity. Mishin was first coached by Nina Lepninskaya, a pupil of Nikolai Panin, and later by Maya Belenkaya.

== Competitive career ==
Mishin competed in singles within the Soviet Union and won the bronze medal at the 1964 Soviet Championships. In 1966, he took up pair skating as an experiment, teaming up with his first and only partner, Tamara Moskvina. They were coached by Igor Moskvin. Together they won the 1969 Soviet Championships, defeating both the two-time Olympic champions Ludmila Belousova and Oleg Protopopov, and the future champions Irina Rodnina and Alexei Ulanov. They went on to win silver at the 1969 World Championships. At the European Championships, they won silver in 1968 and bronze in 1969. Moskvina took time off to have a baby and they decided to retire to concentrate on their coaching careers, with Mishin focusing on coaching singles while Moskvina focused on pairs. Mishin was 28 when he retired from competition and he said he was glad to start coaching when he was young.

He later stated:

"Tamara Moskvina and I were famous in the USSR: people recognized us in the shops, we could buy a car... But from the very start I looked forward to training other people and never regretted becoming a coach."

== Coaching career ==
Mishin graduated from university with a degree in mechanics and his dissertation focused on the mechanical base of figure skating technique. He started with coaching junior ladies to success at national and international competitions, but later switched to men's singles. He rapidly became a well-known coach, due to his training methods that made the skaters learn jumps very quickly. He has written several books on the biomechanics of figure skating and jumps which have been published in Russia, Germany, China, Japan and several other countries.

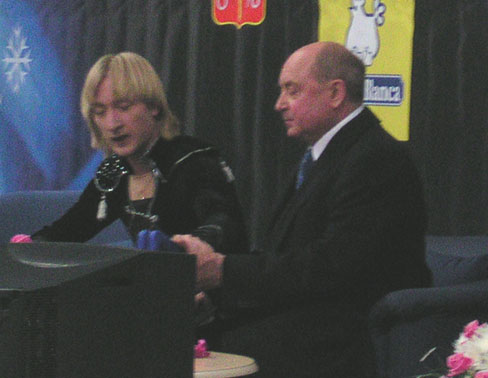
Mishin with pupil Evgeni Plushenko in 2004

Mishin prefers to work with men's single skaters. The most successful students are Alexei Urmanov the 1994 Winter Olympics champion, Alexei Yagudin the 2002 Winter Olympics champion, a four-time World Champion (1998, 1999, 2000, 2002), and Evgeni Plushenko the 2006 Winter Olympics champion, 2014 Winter Olympics gold medalist, two-time Olympic silver medalist, and three-time World champion. Plushenko came to Mishin without his parents when he was eleven years old. Then Mishin became Plushenko's father figure, both on and off the ice. Since that time, they have been working together for nearly twenty years.

Plushenko later described Mishin as "Professor Higgins", a character from George Bernard Shaw's play Pygmalion:

"Mishin was like a second father, like Professor Higgins. He taught me how to behave in public. In which hand should I hold the knife, and fork. He pulled me out of the dirt, put me on my feet, and made me into a person."

On the subject of female students, Mishin said in 2009, "better one man of average talent than two super-talented ladies" because "compared with women, men are more sporty and talented and able to learn artistic elements faster" but women are "delicate material".

"Coaching women is dangerous – there's always probability that the story of (mythology) Pygmalion will recur periodically. My wife was a mere pupil at first. See, what has eventually happened?"

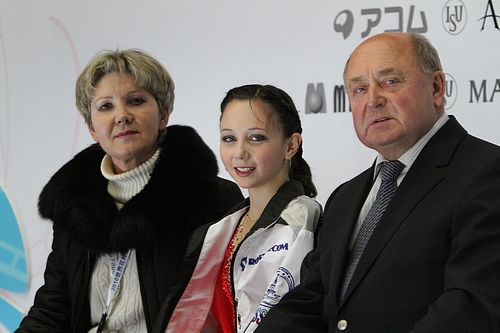
Mishin with pupil Elizaveta Tuktamysheva in 2010

Nevertheless, one of his current students is ladies' single skater Elizaveta Tuktamysheva, the 2021 World Silver Medalist, the 2015 World champion, the 2015 European champion, the 2014–15 Grand Prix Final champion and the 2013 Russian national champion. On the junior level, she is the 2012 Youth Olympics champion, 2011 World Junior silver medalist, and 2010–11 JGP Final silver medalist.

His students include: Evgeni Semenenko and Gleb Lutfullin

His notable former students include Yuri Ovchinnikov, Vitali Egorov, Anna Antonova, Tatiana Oleneva, Oleg Tataurov, Ruslan Novoseltsev, Elena Sokolova, Ksenia Doronina, Tatiana Basova, Andrei Lutai, Sergei Dobrin, Katarina Gerboldt, Artur Gachinski, Maria Stavitskaya, Artur Dmitriev Jr., Petr Gumennik, Elizaveta Nugumanova, Alisa Fedichkina, Alexander Petrov, Sofia Samodurova, Anastasiia Guliakova, Maria Dmitrieva, Mikhail Kolyada, Andrei Lazukin and Sofia Muravieva.

Mishin is a professor at the Lesgaft School of Sports Science and Physical Education and gives seminars all over the world. He is taking part in the development of a figure skating device which measures the number of revolutions in jumps when attached to the skater's body. According to Mishin, this device has already been patented.

Mishin is based at Saint Petersburg's Yubileyny Sports Palace for most of the season but has annual summer training camps in various locations, such as Jaca (Spain), Tartu (Estonia), Courchevel (France) and Pinzolo (Italy). Mishin is surrounded by many talented choreographers such as Lori Nichol, David Wilson, Jeffrey Buttle, Emanuel Sandhu or Benoit Richaud.

== Personal life ==
Mishin is married to Tatiana Mishina (née Oleneva), a former figure skater. They coach together and separately. They have two sons, Andrei Alexeevich Mishin, born in 1977, and Nikolai Alexeevich Mishin, born in 1983.

== Competitive highlights ==
=== Pairs with Tamara Moskvina ===
International
Event	1965–66	1966–67	1967–68	1968–69
Winter Olympics			5th	
World Championships		6th	4th	2nd
European Championships		6th	2nd	3rd
Prize of Moscow News		1st		1st
Winter Universiade	3rd			
National
Soviet Championships	3rd	2nd	2nd	1st

=== Men's singles ===
National
Event	1964
Soviet Championships	3rd

== Orders and rewards ==
- Order of Friendship of Peoples (1994)
- Meritorious Worker of Physical Education of Russian Federation (2002)
- Honoured Master of Sports of the USSR
- Honoured Coach of Sports of the USSR
- Honoured Coach of Sports of Russian Federation
- Commendation of the President of Russia (2002)
- Honorary title "Best in Saint Petersburg's Sports" (2006)

== Publications ==
- Mishin, Alexei (1976). Figure skating jumps (in Russian). Moscow: Fizkultura i sport. p. 104.
- Mishin, Alexei (1979). School in figure skating (in Russian). Moscow: Fizkultura i sport. p. 175.
- Mishin, Alexei (1981). Biomechanics of figure skaters' moves (in Russian). Moscow: Fizkultura i sport. p. 144.
- Mishin, Alexei, ed. (1985). Figure skating: A study manual for sports colleges (in Russian). Moscow: Fizkultura i sport. p. 271.
