= 1972 European Figure Skating Championships =

Figure skating competition

1972 European Championships
- Type: ISU Championship
- Season: 1971-72
- Location: Gothenburg, Sweden
- Venue: Scandinavium

Champions
- Men's singles: (Czechoslovakia) Ondrej Nepela
- Ladies' singles: (Austria) Beatrix Schuba
- Pairs: (Soviet Union) Irina Rodnina / Aleksey Ulanov
- Ice dance: (West Germany) Angelika Buck / Erich Buck
- Previous: 1971 European Championships
- Next: 1973 European Championships

The 1972 European Figure Skating Championships was a senior-level international competition held at the Scandinavium in Gothenburg, Sweden from 11 to 15 January. Elite senior-level figure skaters from European ISU member nations competed for the title of European Champion in the disciplines of men's singles, ladies' singles, pair skating, and ice dancing.

== Overview ==
The 1970 European bronze medalist, Günter Zöller, arrived in Gothenburg with the East German team but withdrew before the start of the event after going to the West German embassy to defect.

In the men's event, the top three after the compulsory figures held their placements for the medals. Ondrej Nepela completed triple salchow and toe loop jumps and finished first in the CF and the FS too. Sergey Chetverukhin finished second in CF and 3rd in FS, who skated with powerful, and elegance but fell on a triple salchow attempt. Patrick Péra won the bronze medal with no triples at all after he finished 3rd in the CF and 4th in the FS.. Yuriy Ovchinnikov placed second in the free skating but was unable to move up to the podium after placing 7th in the CF.

The ladies' title was again won by defending champion Beatrix Schuba, who built up such an overwhelming lead in the compulsory figures that she won by a huge margin despite placing 5th in the free skating. Afterwards a German newspaper mocked her as the "Champion Without a Double Axel". Rita Trapanese took the silver medal, while Sonja Morgenstern moved up to bronze medal position after winning the free skating with a performance for which she received a 6.0 mark for artistic impression.

In the pairs event, Irina Rodnina / Aleksey Ulanov also successfully defended their title in spite of some small mistakes. Lyudmila Smirnova / Andrey Suraykin won the silver with a performance that was considered more artistic, if less difficult, than that of the winners. The third-place team, Manuela Groß / Uwe Kagelmann, included two thrown double axels in their free skating, which at that time was one of the most difficult elements attempted by pair skaters, and unusual enough to draw comment. As Gross was only 14 years old at this time while her partner Kagelmann was a tall grown man of 21, they were one of the first of what later became known as "one-and-a-half" or "flea-and-gorilla" pair teams.

The dance event was the only discipline in which the title changed hands, as Angelika and Erich Buck unseated the defending champions Lyudmila Pakhomova / Aleksandr Gorshkov. The bronze medal went to the veteran British competitor Janet Sawbridge, now skating with Peter Dalby. It was Sawbridge's sixth medal at the European championships, achieved with three different partners.

== Results ==
=== Men ===
Rank	Name	Places
1	(Czechoslovakia) Ondrej Nepela	
2	(Soviet Union) Sergey Chetverukhin	
3	(France) Patrick Péra	
4	(United Kingdom) Haig Oundjian	
5	(United Kingdom) John Curry	
6	(Soviet Union) Vladimir Kovalyov	
7	(Soviet Union) Yuriy Ovchinnikov	
8	(France) Didier Gailhaguet	
9	(Switzerland) Daniel Höner	
10	(Czechoslovakia) Zdeněk Pazdírek	
11	(East Germany) Bernd Wunderlich	
12	(Austria) Josef Schneider	
13	(Italy) Stefano Bargauan	
14	(Hungary) László Vajda	
15	(West Germany) Harald Kuhn	
16	(Austria) Günther Hilgarth	
17	(United Kingdom) Gordon Andison	
18	(Romania) György Fazekas	
19	(Finland) Pekka Leskinen	
20	(Czechoslovakia) Peter Augustovič	
21	(Sweden) Thomas Öberg	
22	(Socialist Federal Republic of Yugoslavia) Zoran Matas	
23	(Denmark) John Ferdinandsen	
WD	(East Germany) Günter Zöller	DNS

=== Ladies ===
Rank	Name	Places
1	(Austria) Beatrix Schuba	
2	(Italy) Rita Trapanese	
3	(East Germany) Sonja Morgenstern	
4	(Hungary) Zsuzsa Almássy	30
5	(East Germany) Christine Errath	
6	(Switzerland) Charlotte Walter	
7	(United Kingdom) Jean Scott	
8	(United Kingdom) Maria McLean	
9	(Netherlands) Dianne de Leeuw	
10	(Soviet Union) Yelena Aleksandrova	
11	(West Germany) Isabel de Navarre	
12	(Czechoslovakia) Liana Drahová	
13	(West Germany) Gerti Schanderl	
14	(Sweden) Anita Johansson	
15	(Switzerland) Karin Iten	
16	(Italy) Cinzia Frosio	
17	(Austria) Sonja Balun	
18	(Poland) Urszula Zielińska	
19	(Czechoslovakia) Hana Knapová	
20	(France) Marie-Claude Bierre	
21	(East Germany) Steffi Knoll	
22	(Austria) Iris Ebenwaldner	
23	(Soviet Union) Marina Sanaya	
24	(Switzerland) Donna Walter	
25	(Socialist Federal Republic of Yugoslavia) Helena Gazvoda	
26	(Italy) Manuela Bertelè	
27	(Norway) Liv Egelund	
28	(Denmark) Kirsten Frikke	

=== Pairs ===
Rank	Name	Places
1	(Soviet Union) Irina Rodnina / Aleksey Ulanov	
2	(Soviet Union) Lyudmila Smirnova / Andrey Suraykin	
3	(East Germany) Manuela Groß / Uwe Kagelmann	
4	(West Germany) Almut Lehmann / Herbert Wiesinger	
5	(East Germany) Annette Kansy / Axel Salzmann	
6	(Soviet Union) Irina Chernyayeva / Vasiliy Blagov	
7	(East Germany) Marlies Radunsky / Rolf Österreich	
8	(Poland) Grażyna Osmańska / Adam Brodecki	
9	(West Germany) Corinna Halke / Eberhard Rausch	
10	(United Kingdom) Linda Connolly / Colin Taylforth	
11	(France) Florence Cahn / Jean-Roland Racle	
12	(Poland) Teresa Skrzek / Piotr Szczypa	
13	(West Germany) Gabriele Cieplik / Reinhard Ketterer	
14	(Switzerland) Karin Künzle / Christian Künzle	
15	(Austria) Ursula Nemec / Michael Nemec	
16	(France) Pascale Kovelmann / Jean-Pierre Rondel	
17	(Czechoslovakia) Miroslava Sáblíková / Pavel Komárek	
18	(United Kingdom) Jayne Torvill / Michael Hutchinson	

=== Ice dance ===
Rank	Name	Places
1	(West Germany) Angelika Buck / Erich Buck	
2	(Soviet Union) Lyudmila Pakhomova / Aleksandr Gorshkov	
3	(United Kingdom) Janet Sawbridge / Peter Dalby	
4	(United Kingdom) Hilary Green / Glynn Watts	
5	(Soviet Union) Tetyana Voytyuk / Vyacheslav Zhyhalyn	
6	(Soviet Union) Yelena Zharkova / Gennadiy Karponosov	
7	(Czechoslovakia) Diana Skotnická / Martin Skotnický	
8	(United Kingdom) Rosalind Druce / David Barker	
9	(Poland) Teresa Weyna / Piotr Bojańczyk	
10	(France) Anne-Claude Wolfers / Roland Mars	
11	(Hungary) Krisztina Regőczy / András Sallay	
12	(Italy) Matilde Ciccia / Lamberto Ceserani	
13	(West Germany) Sylvia Fuchs / Michael Fuchs	
14	(Poland) Ewa Kołodziej / Tadeusz Góra	
15	(Austria) Brigitte Scheijbal / Walter Leschetizky	
16	(Switzerland) Silvia Bodmer / Beat Steib	
17	(West Germany) Astrid Kopp / Axel Kopp	
18	(Czechoslovakia) Světlana Marinovová / Miloš Buršík	
19	(Denmark) Vivi Poulsen / Kurt Poulsen	
