= Ray Wilson =

Ray Wilson may refer to:

== Sports ==
- Ray Wilson (baseball) (1870–1912), American Negro leagues baseball player
- Ray Wilson (basketball) (1932–2015), American basketball coach
- Ray Wilson (English footballer) (1934–2018), member of the England team that won the 1966 World Cup
- Ray Wilson (figure skater) (born 1944), British figure skater
- Ray Wilson (Australian rules footballer) (born 1945), former Australian rules footballer
- Ray Wilson (Scottish footballer) (born 1947), Scottish football full-back (West Bromwich Albion)
- Ray Wilson (speedway rider) (born 1947), English speedway rider
- Ray Wilson (American football) (born 1971), US American footballer

== Science ==
- Raymond Wilson (physicist) (1928–2018), English physicist and telescope optics designer

== Arts ==
- Ray Wilson (musician) (born 1968), vocalist and musician (Stiltskin, Genesis)
