= Ondrej Nepela =

Slovak figure skater (1951–1989)

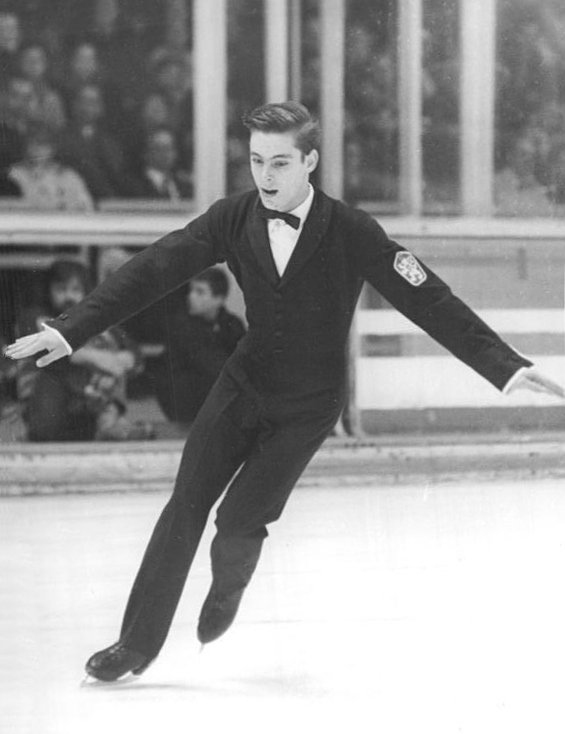
- Nepela in 1972

Personal information
- Born: 22 January 1951 Bratislava, Czechoslovakia
- Died: 2 February 1989 (aged 38) Mannheim, West Germany

Figure skating career
- Country: Czechoslovakia
- Skating club: Slovan Bratislava
- Began skating: 1958
- Retired: 1973
Medal record
Representing Czechoslovakia
Men's Figure skating
Olympic Games
Gold medal – first place	1972 Sapporo	Men's singles
World Championships
Gold medal – first place	1973 Bratislava	Men's singles
Gold medal – first place	1972 Calgary	Men's singles
Gold medal – first place	1971 Lyon	Men's singles
Silver medal – second place	1970 Ljubljana	Men's singles
Silver medal – second place	1969 Colorado Springs	Men's singles
European Championships
Gold medal – first place	1973 Cologne	Men's singles
Gold medal – first place	1972 Gothenburg	Men's singles
Gold medal – first place	1971 Zürich	Men's singles
Gold medal – first place	1970 Leningrad	Men's singles
Gold medal – first place	1969 Garmisch-Partenkirchen	Men's singles
Bronze medal – third place	1968 Västerås	Men's singles
Bronze medal – third place	1967 Ljubljana	Men's singles
Bronze medal – third place	1966 Bratislava	Men's singles

Ondrej Nepela (22 January 1951 – 2 February 1989) was a Slovak figure skater who represented Czechoslovakia. He was the 1972 Olympic champion, a three-time World champion (1971–1973), and a five-time European champion (1969–1973). Later in his career, he performed professionally and became a coach.

== Early life ==
Nepela was born on 22 January 1951 in Bratislava, Czechoslovakia. His mother, a housewife and seamstress, and father, a chauffeur, were from central Slovakia.

== Career ==
Nepela became interested in skating after watching the 1958 European Championships on television — Karol Divín won the men's title for Czechoslovakia. In February 1958, his mother brought the seven-year-old to a Bratislava ice rink. After two weeks, she approached Hilda Múdra to complain that her son was being ignored by the instructors and Múdra agreed to teach him. She described him as a diligent and punctual student. Nepela trained at the Slovan Bratislava club.

=== Competitive career ===
At age 13, Nepela was assigned to his first major international event — the 1964 Winter Olympics. After placing 22nd in Innsbruck, Austria, he debuted at the World Championships and finished 17th.

In the 1965–66 season, Nepela stepped onto his first ISU Championship podium, winning bronze medal at the 1966 European Championships in Bratislava. He then reached the top ten at the 1966 World Championships in Davos, Switzerland. Over the next two seasons, Nepela won two more European bronze medals and placed eighth at his second Olympics, in Grenoble, France.

In the 1968–69 season, he won gold at the 1969 European Championships in Garmisch-Partenkirchen, West Germany, and stood on his first World podium as the silver medalist at the 1969 World Championships in Colorado Springs, Colorado. The following year, he defended his European title at the 1970 European Championships in Leningrad, Soviet Union, before winning another silver medal at the 1970 World Championships, held in Ljubljana, Yugoslavia.

In 1971, Nepela won his third European title in Zürich, Switzerland and then captured his first World title at the 1971 World Championships in Lyon, France. After becoming the European champion for the fourth consecutive year in Gothenburg (Sweden), Nepela traveled to Sapporo, Japan to compete at his third Olympics. Placing first in the compulsory figures and fourth in the free skate, he finished first overall ahead of the Soviet Union's Sergei Chetverukhin and won the gold medal at the 1972 Winter Olympics, became one of the youngest male figure skating Olympic champions.

Nepela wanted to retire from competition after the 1971–72 season, but agreed to continue one more year because the 1973 World Championships were to be held in Bratislava. After winning his third World title in his hometown, he ended his amateur career. Múdra was his coach throughout his career.

=== Professional career, coaching, and awards ===
From 1973 to 1986, Nepela toured as a soloist with Holiday on Ice. He then established himself as a coach in Germany, coaching Claudia Leistner to her European title in 1989.

In 1972, Nepela was awarded the title of Merited Master of Sport of the USSR. Since 1993, the Slovak Figure Skating Association has held a competition each autumn called the Ondrej Nepela Memorial. In December 2000, the Slovak Republic named him Slovak athlete of the 20th century. Múdra accepted the award on his behalf.

== Later years and personal life ==
In 1988, Nepela began to develop health problems and had two teeth removed. He died in Mannheim in February 1989, at the age of 38. The medical report from Mannheim hospital named cancer of the lymph nodes as the cause of death.

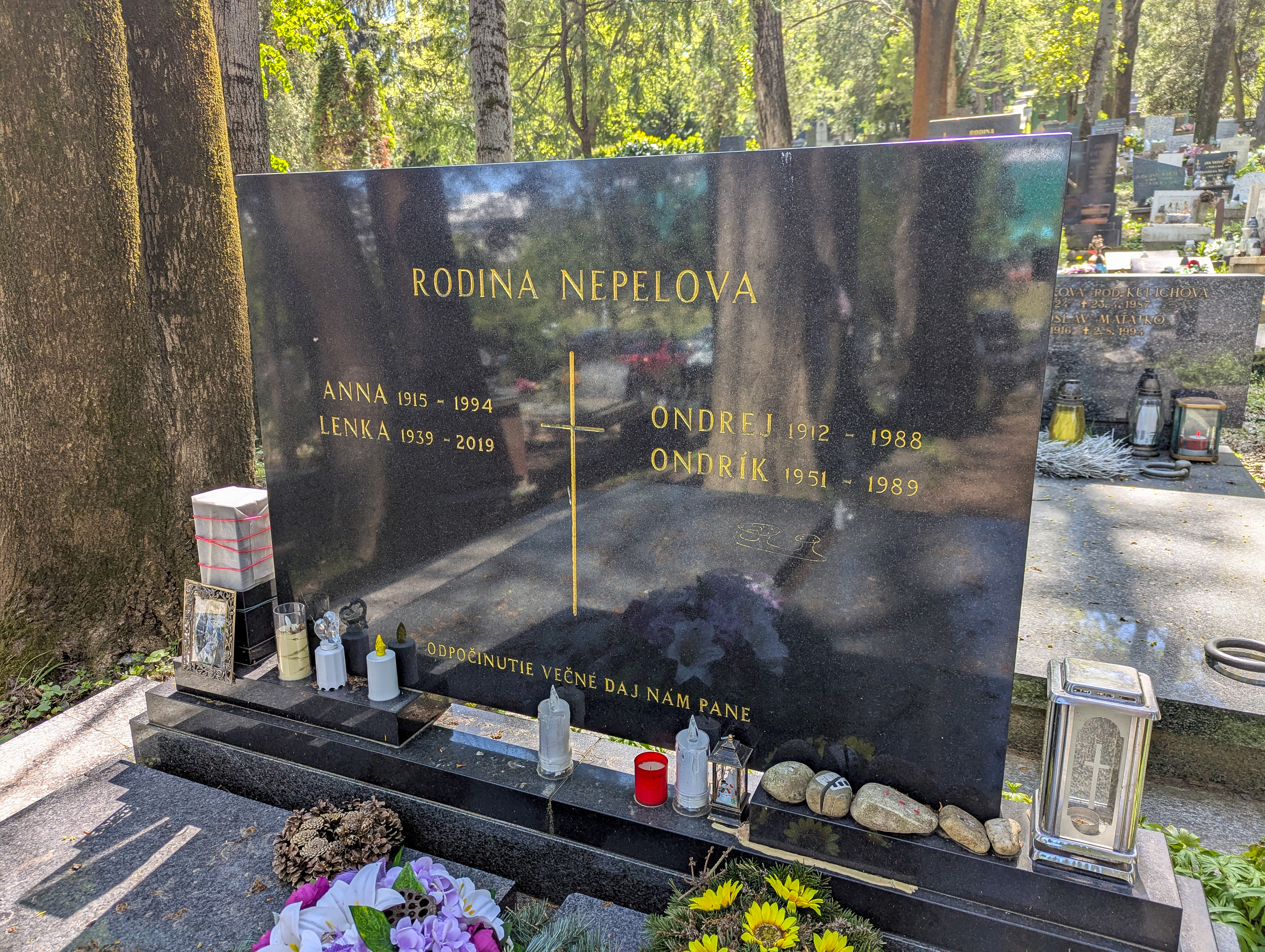
Grave of Nepela Family

== Legacy ==
Debuting in 1993, the Nepela Memorial is an annual figure skating competition held in Slovakia and named in his honor.

== Competitive Highlights ==
Competition placements since the 1963–64 season
Season	1963–64	1964–65	1965–66	1966–67	1967–68	1968–69	1969–70	1970–71	1971–72	1972–73
Winter Olympics	22nd				8th					
World Championships	17th	16th	8th	6th	6th	2nd	2nd	1st	1st	1st
European Championships		8th	3rd	3rd	3rd	1st	1st	1st	1st	1st
Czechoslovak Championships	2nd	1st	1st	1st	1st	1st		1st	1st	1st
Moscow News Trophy				1st						
Prague Skate		1st	2nd	1st	1st					
