= David Hickinbottom =

British figure skater

Figure skating career
- Country: Great Britain
Medal record
Representing Great Britain
Figure skating: Ice dancing
World Championships
Silver medal – second place	1965 Colorado Springs	Ice dancing
Bronze medal – third place	1964 Dortmund	Ice dancing
European Championships
Silver medal – second place	1964 Grenoble	Ice dancing
Silver medal – second place	1965 Moscow	Ice dancing
Bronze medal – third place	1963 Budapest	Ice dancing

David Hickinbottom is a British figure skater who competed in ice dance.

Partnered with Janet Sawbridge, he won bronze at the 1964 World Figure Skating Championships and silver at the 1965 World Figure Skating Championships.

== Competitive highlights ==
With Janet Sawbridge

International
Event	1963	1964	1965
World Championships	4th	3rd	2nd
European Championships	3rd	2nd	2nd
National
British Championships	2nd	1st	1st
