= Erich Reifschneider =

German figure skater

Personal information
- Born: 7 September 1957 (age 69) Bad Nauheim, Hesse, West Germany

Figure skating career
- Country: West Germany
- Retired: c. 1975

Erich Reifschneider (born 7 September 1957 in Bad Nauheim) is a former competitive figure skater who represented West Germany. He is the 1971 Nebelhorn Trophy champion and a three-time national champion (1973–75). He competed at five ISU Championships; his best result, 12th, came at the 1973 Europeans in Cologne and 1974 Europeans in Zagreb. He works as a doctor in Florstadt.

== Competitive highlights ==
Event	70–71	71–72	72–73	73–74	74–75
World Championships			15th	14th	
European Championships			12th	12th	13th
Nebelhorn Trophy		1st	3rd		
German Championships	2nd	2nd	1st	1st	1st
