= Chang Myung-su =

South Korean figure skater (born 1956)

Personal information
- Nationality: South Korean
- Born: 6 March 1956 (age 69)

Sport
- Sport: Figure skating

Chang Myung-su (born 6 March 1956) is a South Korean former figure skater. She competed in the ladies' singles event at the 1972 Winter Olympics.

Chang was taken by her coach Hong Yong-myeong to the 1967 World Championships. There was a controversy around whether Chang could perform due to her age, though the organizers eventually let Chang do a two-minute presentation.

== Palmarés ==
Evento	1972	1973	1974
Olympic Games	19th		
World Championships	18th	25th	20th
