= Angelika Buck =

German ice dancer

Personal information
- Born: 9 June 1950 (age 76) Ravensburg, West Germany

Figure skating career
- Country: West Germany
- Retired: 1973
Medal record
Figure skating
Ice dancing
Representing West Germany
Silver medal – second place	1973 Bratislava	Ice dancing
Silver medal – second place	1972 Calgary	Ice dancing
Silver medal – second place	1971 Lyon	Ice dancing
Bronze medal – third place	1970 Ljubljana	Ice dancing
European Championships
Silver medal – second place	1973 Cologne	Ice dancing
Gold medal – first place	1972 Gothenburg	Ice dancing
Silver medal – second place	1971 Zürich	Ice dancing
Silver medal – second place	1970 Leningrad	Ice dancing

Angelika Buck (born 9 June 1950) is a German former ice dancer who competed for West Germany. With her brother Erich Buck, she is the 1972 European champion, a four-time World medalist, and a six-time West German national champion.

== Career ==
Angelika and Erich Buck were coached by Betty Callaway in Oberstdorf. They represented West Germany and the ERV Ravensburg club.

The Buck siblings started their career by placing 13th at the 1966 European Championships, going on to come in 10th at the Worlds Championships in 1967. They came in sixth place at the 1968 European Championships, in fourth place at the 1969 Europeans, in eighth place at the 1968 Worlds and in fifth place at the 1969 Worlds.

They were the first Germans to capture the European ice dancing title. They did so at the 1972 European Championships in Gothenburg, upsetting Lyudmila Pakhomova / Alexander Gorshkov. They also won three silver medals at Europeans and four medals at the World Championships (three silver and one bronze). They took gold at the West German Championships six times.

The Buck siblings invented the "Ravensburger Waltz", which became one of the ISU's compulsory/pattern dances. They debuted it at the 1973 German Championships.

== Personal life ==
Angelika Buck studied at university in Munich. She is married and has two children.

== Results ==
International
Event	64–65	65–66	66–67	67–68	68–69	69–70	70–71	71–72	72–73
World Champ.			10th	8th	5th	3rd	2nd	2nd	2nd
European Champ.		13th		6th	4th	2nd	2nd	1st	2nd
Nebelhorn Trophy							1st	1st	
National
West Germany	4th	2nd	2nd	1st	1st	1st	1st	1st	1st
