= Ágnes Erős =

Hungarian figure skater

- Born: 22 October 1959 (age 65); Budapest, Hungary

Figure skating career
- Discipline: Singles

Ágnes Erős (born October 22, 1959 in Budapest) is a Hungarian former figure skater who won the Hungarian Figure Skating Championships multiple times. She was the national champion from 1973 to 1975 and again from 1977 to 1979. She also participated in Holiday on Ice in 1978.

== Results ==
Hungarian Figure Skating Championships
Year	Result
1973	1st
1974	1st
1975	1st
1976	
1977	1st
1978	1st
1979	1st

World Figure Skating Championships
Year	Result
1973	27th
