= Erich Buck =

German former ice dancer

Personal information
- Born: 5 January 1949 (age 77) Ravensburg, Allied-occupied Germany

Figure skating career
- Country: West Germany
- Retired: 1973
Medal record
Figure skating
Ice dancing
Representing West Germany
| Silver medal – second place | 1973 Bratislava | Ice dancing |
| Silver medal – second place | 1972 Calgary | Ice dancing |
| Silver medal – second place | 1971 Lyon | Ice dancing |
| Bronze medal – third place | 1970 Ljubljana | Ice dancing |
European Championships
| Silver medal – second place | 1973 Cologne | Ice dancing |
| Gold medal – first place | 1972 Gothenburg | Ice dancing |
| Silver medal – second place | 1971 Zürich | Ice dancing |
| Silver medal – second place | 1970 Leningrad | Ice dancing |

Erich Buck (born 5 January 1949) is a German former ice dancer who competed for West Germany. With his sister Angelika Buck, he is the 1972 European champion, a four-time World medalist, and a six-time West German national champion.

== Career ==
Angelika and Erich Buck were coached by Betty Callaway in Oberstdorf. They represented West Germany and the ERV Ravensburg club.

The Buck siblings started their career by placing 13th at the 1966 European Championships, going on to come in 10th at the Worlds Championships in 1967. They came in sixth place at the 1968 European Championships, in fourth place at the 1969 Europeans, in eighth place at the 1968 Worlds and in fifth place at the 1969 Worlds.

They were the first Germans to capture the European ice dancing title. They did so at the 1972 European Championships in Gothenburg, upsetting Lyudmila Pakhomova / Alexander Gorshkov. They also won three silver medals at Europeans and four medals at the World Championships (three silver and one bronze). They took gold at the West German Championships six times.

The Buck siblings invented the "Ravensburger Waltz", which became one of the ISU's compulsory/pattern dances. They debuted it at the 1973 German Championships.

== Personal life ==
Erich Buck studied managerial economics at university in Munich. He manages an insurance office in his hometown, Ravensburg. He is married and has two children.

== Results ==
International
| Event | 64–65 | 65–66 | 66–67 | 67–68 | 68–69 | 69–70 | 70–71 | 71–72 | 72–73 |
|---|---|---|---|---|---|---|---|---|---|
| World Champ. | | | 10th | 8th | 5th | 3rd | 2nd | 2nd | 2nd |
| European Champ. | | 13th | | 6th | 4th | 2nd | 2nd | 1st | 2nd |
| Nebelhorn Trophy | | | | | | | 1st | 1st | |
National
| West Germany | 4th | 2nd | 2nd | 1st | 1st | 1st | 1st | 1st | 1st |
