= Yubileyny Sports Palace =

Architectural structure

Jubilee Sports Palace
- Спортивный комплекс "Юбилейный"
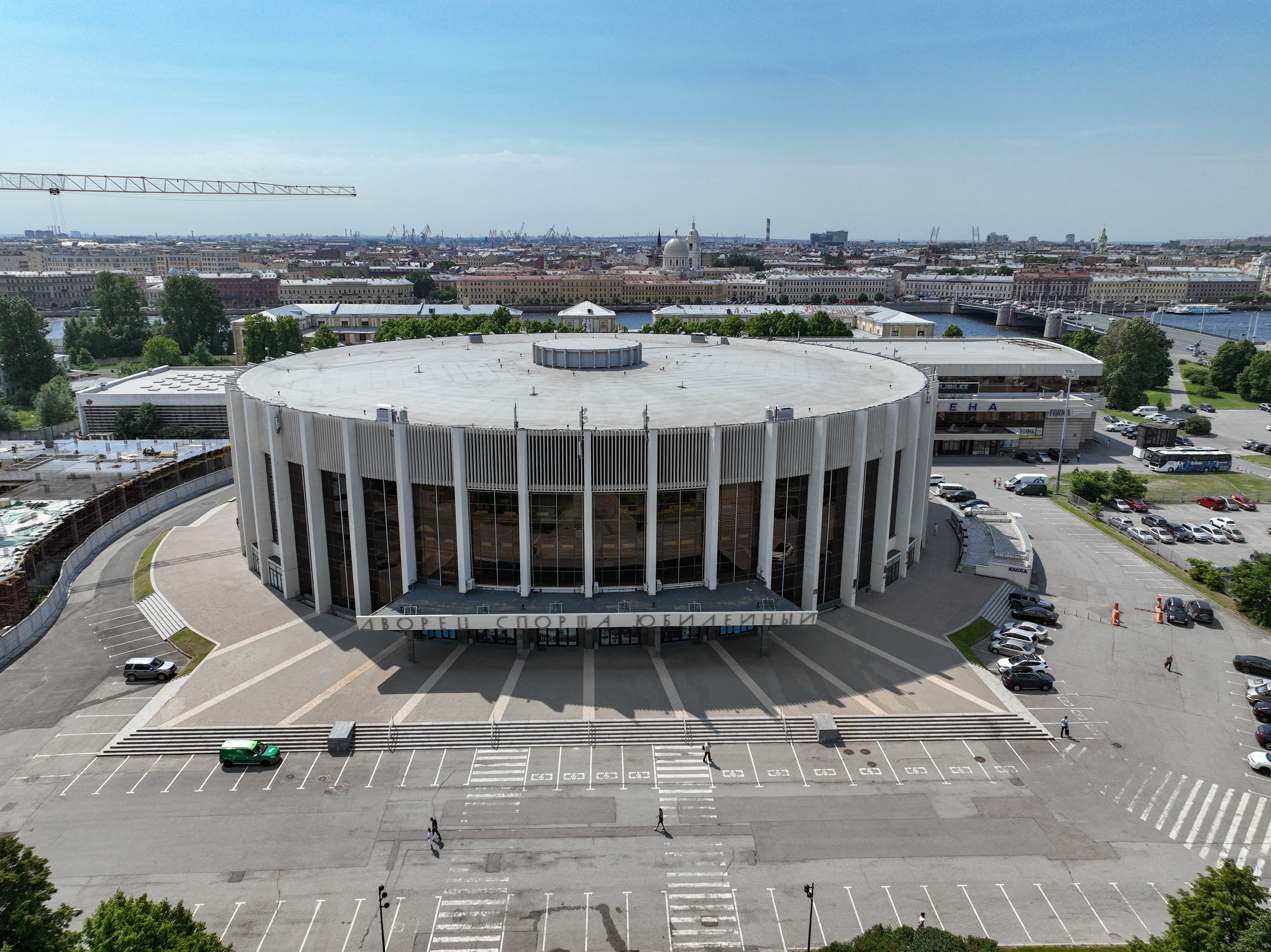
- Interactive map of Jubilee Sports Palace
- Location: St. Petersburg, Russia
- Coordinates: 59°57′01″N 30°17′31″E
- Capacity: Ice hockey: 7,000; Basketball: 7,044

Construction
- Built: 1965–1967
- Opened: 1967
- Renovated: 2007–2009, 2015–2016
- Expanded: 2008

Website
- www.yubi.ru

Yubileyny Sports Palace (Russian: спортивный комплекс «Юбилейный»; Sportivniy kompleks Yubileyniy), also translated as Jubilee Palace of Sports, is an indoor sports arena and concert complex that is located in St. Petersburg, Russia. It houses more than 7,000 seats for ice hockey and basketball.

The complex was completed in 1967, as a present from the Federation of Trade Unions, to the city of Saint Petersburg, on the 50th anniversary of Soviet power. The Palace hosts a wide variety of activities, including athletic training and competitions, conventions, festivals, and musical concerts.

== History ==
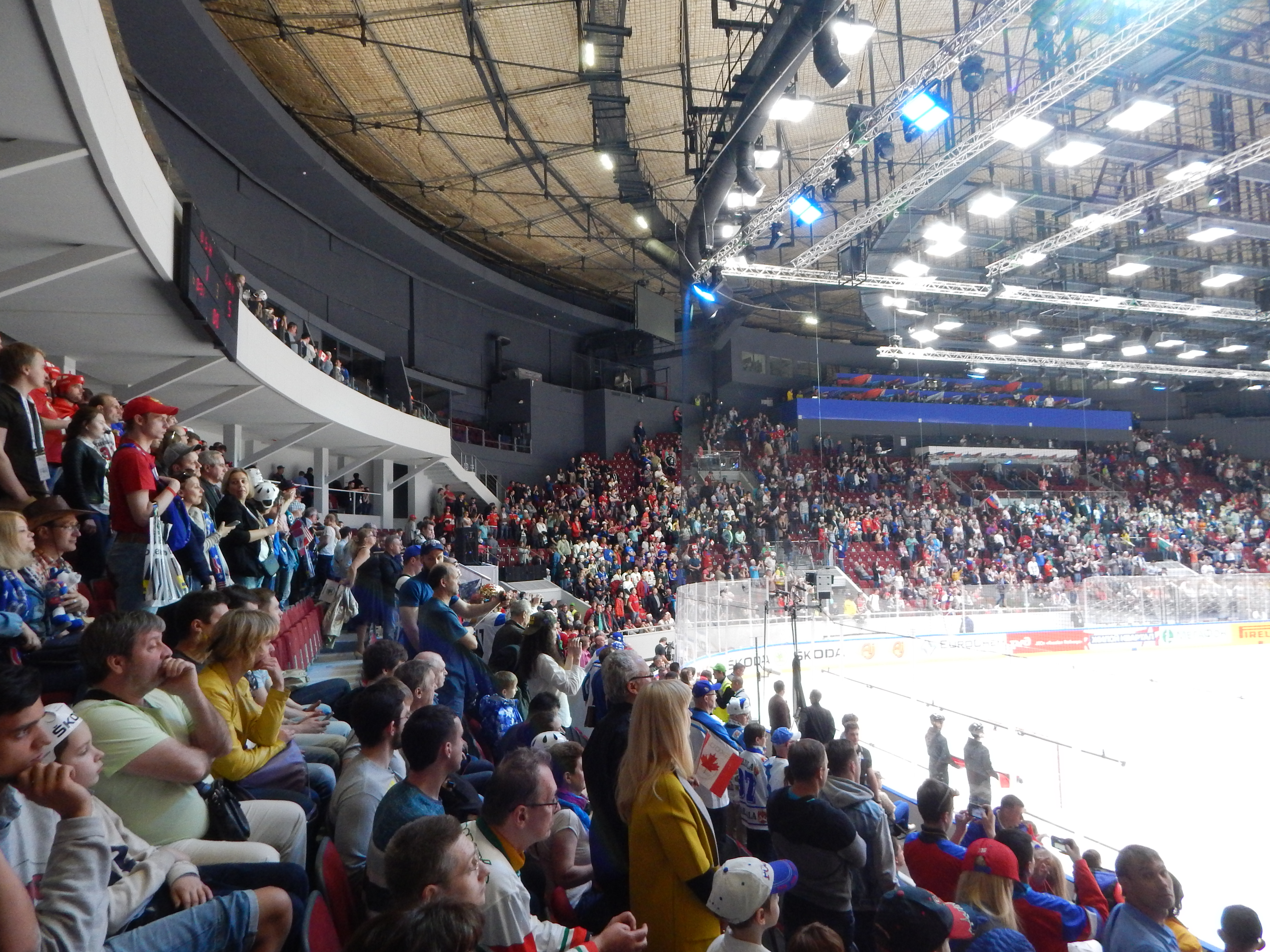
Tribunes 8 and 9 of the Yubileyny Sports Palace during the opening game of 2016 IIHF World Championship

Until the 1960s, the site (on the area of a channel that had been filled in at the beginning of the 20th century between Penkovy Buyan and the Petrograd Side) was occupied by a municipal plant nursery.

The complex was designed by engineer A. P. Morozov (also N. Zadvin, L. Moskalyova, G. Stolbova, I. Barinova, G. Minchenkova, A. Babchenok, N. Lapteva, and E. Kuzmina), and by architects G. P. Morozov, I. P. Suslikov, A. L. Levkhan'yan, and F. N. Yakovlev. The team was awarded the USSR State Prize in 1971 for this project — primarily for its innovative design. The building was the first in the USSR to feature a cable-stayed roof structure and was nominated both in the fields of science and technology. The 93-meter-wide roof span is supported without additional columns by a "bicycle wheel" type design: the roof rests on a system of steel cables stretched between an inner steel ring and an outer one fixed on pylons, forming a structure of intercrossing paraboloids.

To ensure that the construction could be completed by the 50th anniversary of the Revolution, a three-track railway line was laid around the future building to serve eight cranes working simultaneously. Forty‑eight supports were installed with standard cranes, while cranes used for cable installation were modified (their booms were extended and towers raised), which provided lower lifting capacity but greater reach. Before the cables were tensioned, the central ring was supported by a temporary steel tower. Glazing units were preassembled at the factory — a first in Leningrad's construction practice.

The central building of the complex is circular in plan, 94 m in diameter and 22 m high ("a wide and low cylinder"). Around the glass rotunda, pylons are evenly spaced and connected at the top by a wide band, resembling a traditional colonnade. The concrete facing panels are coated with liquid cement.

Upon opening, athletes praised the quality of the ice, which did not melt even with a full house of spectators. Visitors noted the comfortable temperature and good visibility, while television crews were satisfied with the lighting and broadcasting facilities.

For the 2000 Ice Hockey World Championship, the building underwent renovation. The rotunda was glazed with bronze-tinted glass, a second training rink and additional auxiliary facilities were built (thus the unfinished landscape concept was never realized and the surrounding space became overcrowded).

== Events ==
The complex includes a Large and a Small auxiliary building (the Small Arena and the Training Rink) and a Children's Rink — a total of four ice surfaces. The training building is rectangular, with sloping walls and a height of 8 m; both the main and training structures were built lower than originally planned, according to the decision of the city planning council.

Both the main and small arenas host sporting events, as well as theatrical performances, concerts, and exhibitions.

The complex also includes a public indoor skating rink, offering public skating sessions and various sports and dance classes.

From 4 to 8 February 1970, the palace hosted the European Figure Skating and Ice Dance Championships — the second such event held in Saint Petersburg (Leningrad); the first took place in 1908.

On 6 October 1991, during a concert at the Yubileyny Sports Palace, poet and composer Igor Talkov was killed. In 1992, a memorial plaque was installed at the palace entrance.

In 1 November 1997, it hosted M-1: World Championship 1997, the first major Mixed martial arts (at the time known as "mixfight") event in Russia. The event would be expanded into the M-1 Global promotion.

In 2008, all seats in the Main Arena were replaced, increasing capacity to 7,012 spectators.

In May 2016, the 80th Ice Hockey World Championship was held here.

From 23 to 29 October 2017, the venue hosted the EPICENTER Counter-Strike: Global Offensive esports tournament, won by team SK Gaming.

Russian Figure Skating Championships took place at the arena in December 2017 and December 2025.

The Yubileyny Sports Palace also hosts large-scale concerts. Over the years, performers such as Alena Apina and the rock bands Alisa, Pilot, and Korol i Shut (from 1999 to 2013) have appeared on its stage.

== Jubilee Sport Club ==
The Jubilee Sports Palace's ice rink is home to the Jubilee Sport Club, a training center for figure skating. It is also referred to as SDUSHOR St. Petersburg (Russian: СДЮШОР (Санкт-Петербург)).

During the 1990s, the rink often had poor-quality ice and other problems, resulting in limited training time, even for the 1994 Olympic champion, Alexei Urmanov.

== Citations ==
- Броновицкая, А. Ю.; Малинин, Н. С.; Пальмин, Ю. И. (2023). Ленинград: Архитектура советского модернизма 1955–1991. М: Музей современного искусства «Гараж». p. 344. ISBN 978-5-6045382-0-3.
- Вьюник В. А., Зеленский А. М., Нартов В. Т. Дворец Спорта Юбилейный. — Л.: Лениздат, 1970. — 32 с.
- Вьюник В. А. Волшебники ледяных катков: [Первенство Европы по фигурному катанию на коньках. Ленинград, Дворец Спорта «Юбилейный». Чемпионат Европы 4-8 февраля 1970 года]. — Л.: Лениздат, 1970. — 47 с.
- Тарновская М. З., Морозов А. П. Дворец Спорта Юбилейный (архитектура, конструкция, роль и значение). — Л.: Стройиздат, 1973. — 64 с.
- Осипов К. К., Бурлака А. П., Юбилей «Юбилейного»: 50 страниц истории. — СПб.: Пальмира, 2017. — 75 с.
