= Aleksandr Gorshkov (figure skater) =

Russian ice dancer (1946–2022)

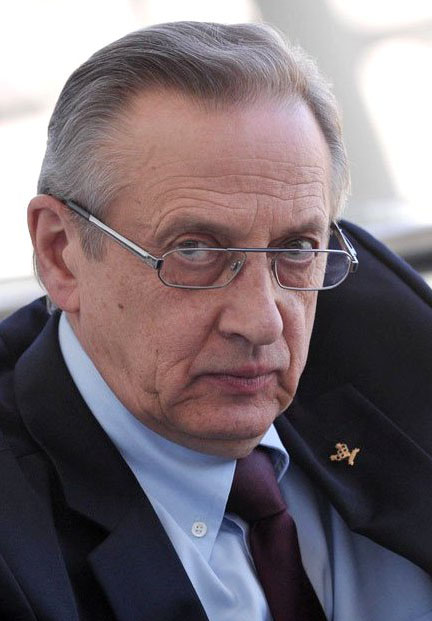
- Gorshkov in 2013

Personal information
- Full name: Aleksandr Georgievich Gorshkov
- Born: 8 October 1946 Moscow, Russian SFSR, Soviet Union
- Died: 17 November 2022 (aged 76) Moscow, Russia
- Height: 173 cm (5 ft 8 in)

Figure skating career
- Country: Soviet Union
- Retired: 1976
Medal record
Figure skating: Ice dancing
Representing Soviet Union
Winter Olympics
Gold medal – first place	1976 Innsbruck	Ice dancing
World Championships
Gold medal – first place	1976 Gothenburg	Ice dancing
Gold medal – first place	1974 Munich	Ice dancing
Gold medal – first place	1973 Bratislava	Ice dancing
Gold medal – first place	1972 Calgary	Ice dancing
Gold medal – first place	1971 Lyon	Ice dancing
Gold medal – first place	1970 Ljubljana	Ice dancing
Silver medal – second place	1969 Colorado Springs	Ice dancing
European Championships
Gold medal – first place	1976 Geneva	Ice dancing
Gold medal – first place	1975 Copenhagen	Ice dancing
Gold medal – first place	1974 Zagreb	Ice dancing
Gold medal – first place	1973 Cologne	Ice dancing
Silver medal – second place	1972 Gothenburg	Ice dancing
Gold medal – first place	1971 Zürich	Ice dancing
Gold medal – first place	1970 Leningrad	Ice dancing
Bronze medal – third place	1969 Garmisch-Partenkirchen	Ice dancing

Aleksandr Georgievich Gorshkov (Russian: Александр Георгиевич Горшков, 8 October 1946 – 17 November 2022) was a Russian ice dancer who competed internationally for the Soviet Union. With his wife Lyudmila Pakhomova, he was the 1976 Olympic champion.

They were also six-time World Champions (1970–74, 1976), as well as six-time European champions (1970–71, 1973–76), which makes them the most decorated athletes all-time at both events in the pair discipline.

Since 2010 and until his death, Gorshkov served as the president of the Figure Skating Federation of Russia (FFKKR).

== Life and career ==
Aleksandr Georgievich Gorshkov was born on 8 October 1946. He began skating at age six after his mother heard that the Sokolniki skating school was taking new students. He was moved to the weakest group after a year but his mother brought him to a stronger one when a new coach took over.

In 1966, while at CSKA Moscow, he received an invitation from Lyudmila Pakhomova to skate with her. Since he had much less experience, some experts were skeptical of her choice. Despite the initial experience gap, Gorshkov said that Pakhomova had a strong personality who was determined they would become champions.

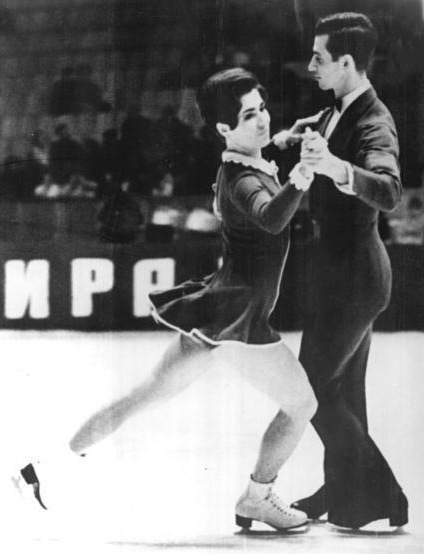
Pakhomova and Gorshkov in 1969

Pakhomova/Gorshkov began training in May 1966, under coach Elena Tchaikovskaia, and made their international debut in December of the same year. They competed for Dynamo. After teaming up, a personal relationship developed between the duo and Gorshkov proposed marriage; Pakhomova responded that they would marry only if they became World champions.

Pakhomova/Gorshkov performed in the ice dancing demonstration event at the 1968 Winter Olympics – the event determined if ice dancing would be added as an official Olympic sport and was successful. They won their first World title in 1970 and married later that year. The duo repeated as World champions in 1971, 1972, 1973, and 1974. In 1974, Pakhomova/Gorshkov and Tchaikovskaia created the Tango Romantica, which the ISU would later adopt as a compulsory dance.

Following the 1975 European Championships, Gorshkov began feeling ill and underwent a lung operation, with their coach Elena Tchaikovskaia donating blood. They flew to Colorado Springs, Colorado for the 1975 World Championships, unsure about their participation. During the first practice session, Gorshkov had trouble breathing and needed to be given oxygen – they withdrew from the event. In the Soviet Union, rumors circulated that Gorshkov had died on the flight to the United States and the chairman of the Soviet Sports Committee called him to check if he was still alive.

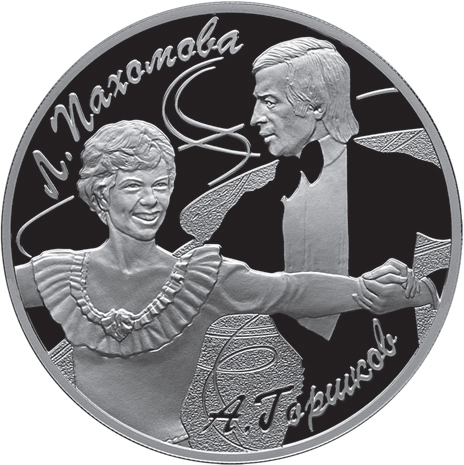
A 3-ruble Russian coin of 2010 commemorating Pakhomova and Gorshkov

Pakhomova/Gorshkov returned to competition the following season. Ice dancing debuted as an official Olympic sport at the 1976 Winter Olympics in Innsbruck, Austria, and Pakhomova/Gorshkov became the first Olympic champions in the discipline. They won their sixth World title in 1976 in Goteburg, Sweden. They retired from competition later that year. In 1977, they had a daughter, Yulia Gorshkova.

Pakhomova died of leukemia on 17 May 1986. Gorshkov and his late wife were inducted into the World Figure Skating Hall of Fame in 1988.

Gorshkov later served as the chairman of the International Skating Union's ice dance technical committee. At an election conference held in Novogorsk on 4 June 2010, he was unanimously elected president of the Figure Skating Federation of Russia. He was president of a Regional Public Charitable Foundation for the Arts and Sports named after Pakhomova.

Gorshkov later married Irina Ivanovna Gorshkova, with whom he has a stepson, Stanislav Belyaev.

On 17 November 2022, the director general of the Russian Figure Skating Federation, Alexander Kogan, announced that Gorshkov had died in Moscow that same day. He was 76.

== Results ==
(with Pakhomova)

International
Event	66–67	67–68	68–69	69–70	70–71	71–72	72–73	73–74	74–75	75–76
Olympics										1st
Worlds	13th	6th	2nd	1st	1st	1st	1st	1st		1st
Europeans	10th	5th	3rd	1st	1st	2nd	1st	1st	1st	1st
Moscow News				1st	1st	1st	1st		1st	1st
National
Soviet Champ.	2nd	2nd	1st	1st	1st		1st	1st	1st	
