= Linda Bernard =

British figure skater

Personal information
- Nationality: British
- Born: 7 December 1950 (age 74); Hampshire, England

Sport
- Sport: Figure skating

Linda Bernard (born 7 December 1950) is a British figure skater. She competed in the pairs event at the 1968 Winter Olympics.
