= Patrick Péra =

French figure skater

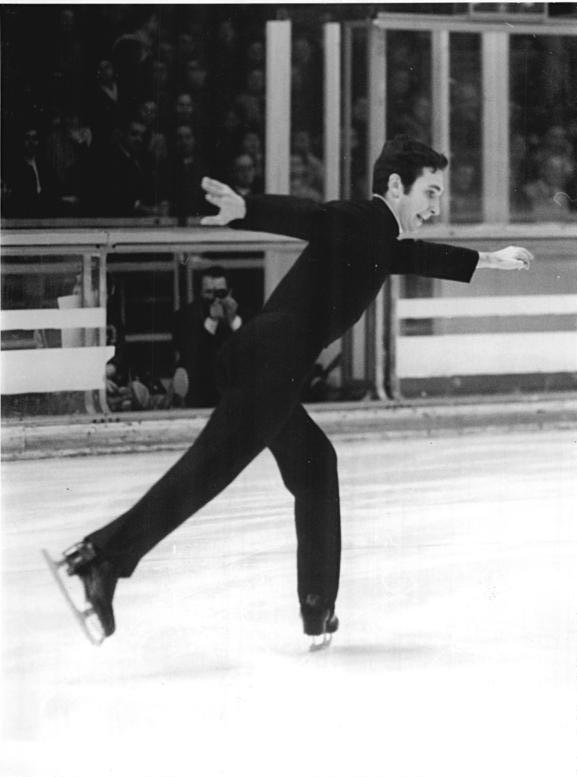
- Patrick Péra in Karl-Marx-Stadt on April 15, 1968

Personal information
- Full name: Patrick Péra
- Born: 17 January 1949 (age 77) Lyon
- Height: 1.76 m (5 ft 9 in)

Figure skating career
- Country: France
Medal record
Representing France
Men's Figure skating
Olympic Games
Bronze medal – third place	1972 Sapporo	Men's singles
Bronze medal – third place	1968 Grenoble	Men's singles
World Championships
Silver medal – second place	1971 Lyon	Men's singles
Bronze medal – third place	1969 Colorado Springs	Men's singles
Bronze medal – third place	1968 Geneva	Men's singles
European Championships
Bronze medal – third place	1972 Gothenburg	Men's singles
Silver medal – second place	1970 Leningrad	Men's singles
Silver medal – second place	1969 Garmisch-Partenkirchen	Men's singles

Olympic medal record

Men's figure skating

Representing France
Bronze medal – third place	1972 Sapporo	Singles
Bronze medal – third place	1968 Grenoble	Singles

Patrick Péra (born 17 January 1949 in Lyon) is a French figure skater. He won the bronze medal in men's singles in the 1968 Winter Olympics, became one of the youngest male figure skating Olympic medalists. He won the bronze medal again at the 1972 Winter Olympics.

== Competitive highlights ==
International
Event	1964	1965	1966	1967	1968	1969	1970	1971	1972
Olympics					3rd				3rd
Worlds	14th	15th	6th	7th	3rd	3rd	4th	2nd	
Europeans			4th	4th	4th	2nd	2nd		3rd
National
France		3rd	1st	1st	1st	1st	1st	1st	1st
