= Lyudmila Pakhomova =

Russian ice dancer (1946–1986)

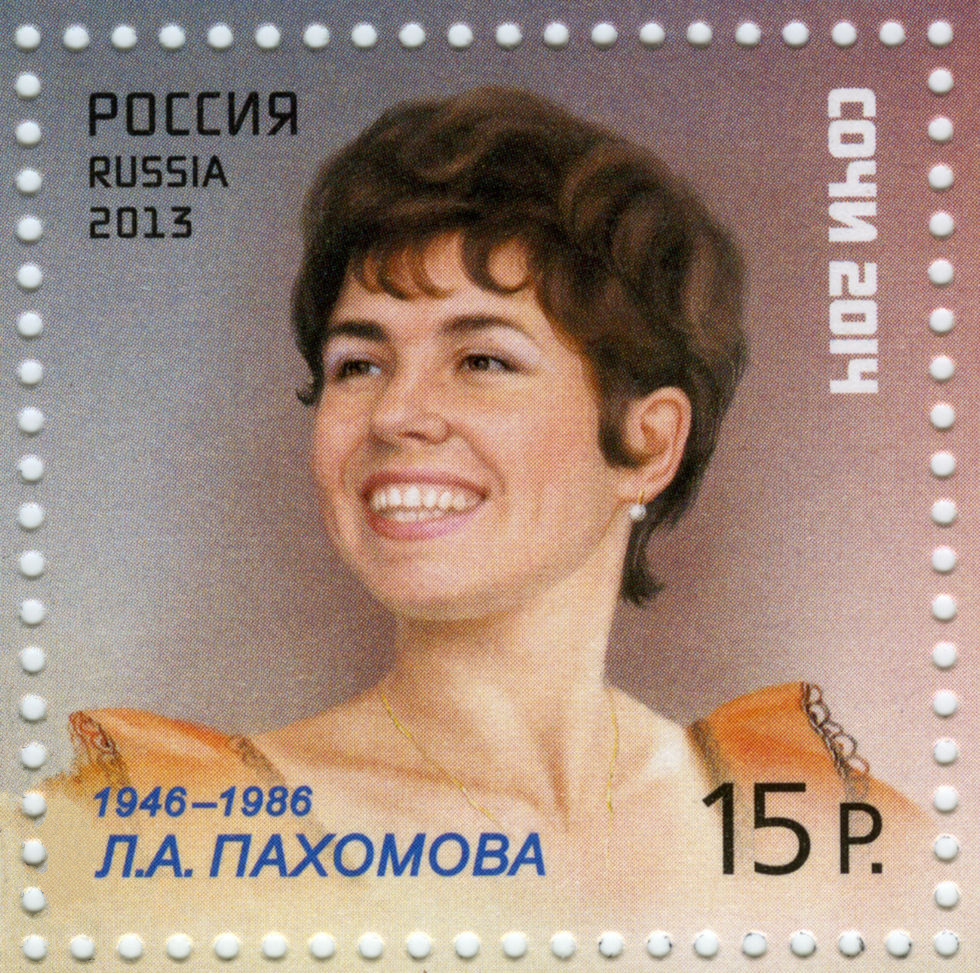
- Pakhomova on a 2013 Russian stamp from the "Sports Legends" series

Personal information
- Full name: Lyudmila Alekseyevna Pakhomova
- Born: 31 December 1946 Moscow, Russian SFSR, USSR (now Russia)
- Died: 17 May 1986 (aged 39) Moscow, Russian SFSR, USSR
- Height: 1.64 m (5 ft 5 in)

Figure skating career
- Country: Soviet Union
Medal record
Figure skating: Ice dancing
Representing Soviet Union
Winter Olympics
| Gold medal – first place | 1976 Innsbruck | Ice dancing |
World Championships
| Gold medal – first place | 1976 Gothenburg | Ice dancing |
| Gold medal – first place | 1974 Munich | Ice dancing |
| Gold medal – first place | 1973 Bratislava | Ice dancing |
| Gold medal – first place | 1972 Calgary | Ice dancing |
| Gold medal – first place | 1971 Lyon | Ice dancing |
| Gold medal – first place | 1970 Ljubljana | Ice dancing |
| Silver medal – second place | 1969 Colorado Springs | Ice dancing |
European Championships
| Gold medal – first place | 1976 Geneva | Ice dancing |
| Gold medal – first place | 1975 Copenhagen | Ice dancing |
| Gold medal – first place | 1974 Zagreb | Ice dancing |
| Gold medal – first place | 1973 Cologne | Ice dancing |
| Silver medal – second place | 1972 Gothenburg | Ice dancing |
| Gold medal – first place | 1971 Zürich | Ice dancing |
| Gold medal – first place | 1970 Leningrad | Ice dancing |
| Bronze medal – third place | 1969 Garmisch-Partenkirchen | Ice dancing |

Lyudmila Alekseyevna Pakhomova (Russian: Людмила Алексеевна Пахомова; 31 December 1946 – 17 May 1986) was a Russian ice dancer who competed for the Soviet Union. With her husband Aleksandr Gorshkov, she was the 1976 Olympic champion, one of the oldest female figure skating Olympic champions.

They are six-time World Champions (1970–1974, 1976), as well as six-time European champions (1970–1971, 1973–1976), which makes them the most decorated of all-time at both events in the pair discipline.

== Life and career ==
Pakhomova was the daughter of Alexei Pakhomov, an aviation general. She began figure skating at age seven, when her grandmother brought her to Children and Youth Sports School by the Young Pioneers Stadium in Moscow. Her first ice dancing partner was the nine-years-older Viktor Ryzhkin, formerly her coach, with whom she trained at CSKA Moscow under Stanislav Zhuk. They won three Soviet national titles and placed 10th at the 1966 World Championships. They were the first Soviet ice dancers to compete at Worlds.

After her partnership with Ryzhkin ended, Pakhomova invited Aleksandr Gorshkovto skate with her. He was only a couple of months older and also trained at CSKA Moscow. Since he had much less experience, some experts were skeptical of her choice. Despite the initial experience gap, Gorshkov said that Pakhomova was a strong personality who was determined they would become champions.

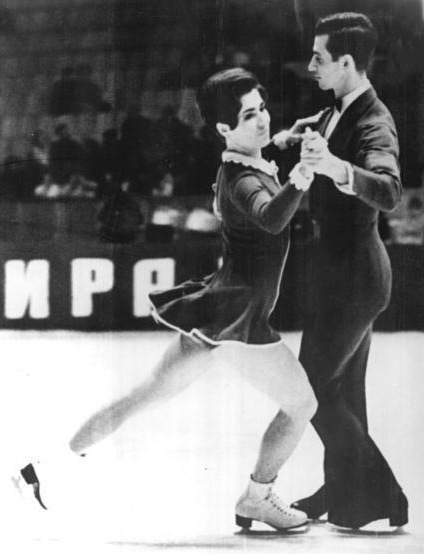
Pakhomova and Gorshkov in 1969

Pakhomova/Gorshkov began training in May 1966, under coach Elena Tchaikovskaia, and made their international debut in December of the same year. They competed for Dynamo. After teaming up, a personal relationship developed between the duo and Gorshkov proposed marriage; Pakhomova responded that they would marry only if they became World champions.

Pakhomova/Gorshkov performed in the ice dancing demonstration event at the 1968 Winter Olympics – the event determined if ice dancing would be added as an official Olympic sport and was successful. They won their first World title in 1970 and married later that year. The duo repeated as World champions in 1971, 1972, 1973, and 1974. In 1974, Pakhomova/Gorshkov and Tchaikovskaya created the Tango Romantica, which the ISU would later adopt as a compulsory dance.

Following the 1975 European Championships, Gorshkov began feeling ill and underwent a lung operation, with their coach Elena Tchaikovskaia donating blood. They flew to Colorado Springs, Colorado, U.S. for the 1975 World Championships, unsure about their participation. During the first practice session, Gorshkov had trouble breathing and needed to be given oxygen – they withdrew from the event. In the Soviet Union, rumors circulated that Gorshkov had died on the flight to the United States and the chairman of the Soviet Sports Committee called him to check if he was still alive.

Pakhomova/Gorshkov returned to competition the following season. Ice dancing debuted as an official Olympic sport at the 1976 Winter Olympics in Innsbruck, Austria, and Pakhomova/Gorshkov became the first Olympic champions in the discipline. They won their sixth World title in 1976 in Gothenburg, Sweden. They retired from competition later that year. In 1977, they had a daughter, Yulia Gorshkova.

Pakhomova began coaching at CSKA. Her students included 1980 and 1981 World Junior champions Elena Batanova / Alexei Soloviev and European medalists Natalia Annenko / Genrikh Sretenski. She coached Igor Shpilband for eight years (age 12 to 20). He and partner Tatiana Gladkova became the 1983 World Junior champions.

In late 1979, Pakhomova began having health problems which were eventually diagnosed as leukemia, but she continued to go out onto the ice even after her cancer made it very difficult. Her husband said she did not want to change anything in her life and it was not in her nature to give up. Pakhomova died at the age of 39 on 17 May 1986 and was interred in the Vagankovo Cemetery in Moscow.

A minor planet, 3231 Mila, discovered by Soviet astronomer Lyudmila Zhuravleva in 1972, is named after her. Pakhomova was posthumously inducted into the World Figure Skating Hall of Fame in 1988, along with Gorshkov.

== Programs ==
Pakhomova and Gorshkov's programs included:

- La cumparsita
- Tango Romantica
- Waltz from Masquerade by Aram Khachaturian
- 1985: Swan Lake by Pyotr Ilyich Tchaikovsky; Shine, Shine, My Star (Гори, Гори, Моя Звезда); Mexican dance
- Ozornye Chastushki (Озорные частушки) by Rodion Shchedrin
- Vdol po Piterskoy (Вдоль по Питерской)
- The Nightingale (Соловей) and Svetit Mesyats (Светит месяц) by Alexander Alyabyev
- Works by Edvard Grieg and Stanisław Moniuszko

== Results ==
=== With Gorshkov ===
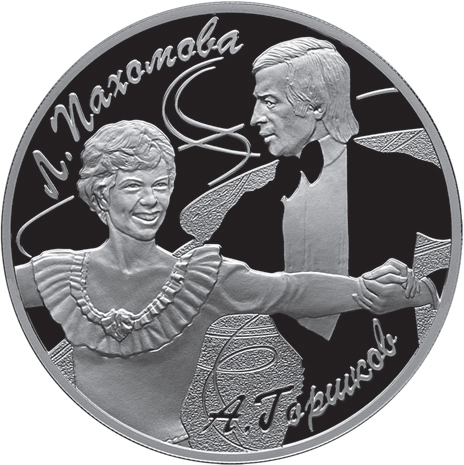
A 3-ruble Russian coin of 2010 commemorating Pakhomova and Gorshkov

International
| Event | 66–67 | 67–68 | 68–69 | 69–70 | 70–71 | 71–72 | 72–73 | 73–74 | 74–75 | 75–76 |
|---|---|---|---|---|---|---|---|---|---|---|
| Olympics | | | | | | | | | | 1st |
| Worlds | 13th | 6th | 2nd | 1st | 1st | 1st | 1st | 1st | | 1st |
| Europeans | 10th | 5th | 3rd | 1st | 1st | 2nd | 1st | 1st | 1st | 1st |
| Moscow News | | | | 1st | 1st | 1st | 1st | | 1st | 1st |
National
| Soviet Champ. | 2nd | 2nd | 1st | 1st | 1st | | 1st | 1st | 1st | |

=== With Ryzhkin ===
International
| Event | 1964 | 1965 | 1966 |
|---|---|---|---|
| World Championships | | | 10th |
| European Championships | | | 7th |
National
| Soviet Championships | 1st | 1st | 1st |
