= Ludwig Gassner =

Austrian luger

Medal record

Luge

European Championships
Bronze medal – third place	1962 Weissenbach	Men's doubles

Ludwig Gassner is an Austrian luger who competed in the early 1960s. He won a bronze medal in the men's doubles event at the 1962 FIL European Luge Championships in Weissenbach, Austria.
