= Elena Alexandrova =

Soviet figure skater

Yelena Alexandrova
Personal information
- Full name: Yelena Anatolyevna Alexandrova
- Born: 17 December 1950 (age 75) Leningrad, Russian SFSR, Soviet Union

Figure skating career
- Country: Soviet Union

Yelena Anatolyevna Alexandrova (Russian: Еле́на Анато́льевна Алекса́ндрова) (born 17 December 1950) is a former Soviet figure skater.

== Results ==
International
Event	1966–67	1967–68	1968–69	1969–70	1970–71	1971–72
World Championships				14th	11th	
European Championships				7th	8th	10th
Prize of Moscow News				2nd		
National
Soviet Championships	4th	3rd	3rd	1st	2nd	
