= Roy Bradshaw (figure skater) =

Figure skating career
- Country: Great Britain
Medal record
Representing Great Britain
Figure skating: Ice dance
European Championships
| Bronze medal – third place | 1971 Zurich | Ice dance |

Roy Bradshaw is a British figure skater who competed in ice dance.

With partner Susan Getty, he won bronze at the 1971 European Figure Skating Championships in Zurich, Switzerland.

== Competitive highlights ==
With Susan Getty

International
| Event | 1969 | 1970 | 1971 | 1972 | 1973 | 1974 |
|---|---|---|---|---|---|---|
| World Championships | 7th | 5th | 4th | | | |
| European Championships | | 5th | 3rd | | | |
National
| British Championships | 3rd | 1st | 1st | | 1st | 1st |
