= Susan Getty =

British figure skater

Figure skating career
- Country: Great Britain
Medal record
Representing Great Britain
Figure skating: Ice dance
European Championships
Bronze medal – third place	1971 Zurich	Ice dance

Susan Getty is a British figure skater who competed in ice dance.

With partner Roy Bradshaw, she won bronze at the 1971 European Figure Skating Championships in Zurich, Switzerland.

== Competitive highlights ==
With Roy Bradshaw

International
Event	1968	1969	1970	1971	1972	1973	1974
World Championships		7th	5th	4th			
European Championships			5th	3rd			
British Championships		3rd	1st	1st		1st	1st
Grand Prix Int. St. Gervais	2nd						
