= Thomas Callerud =

Swedish figure skater

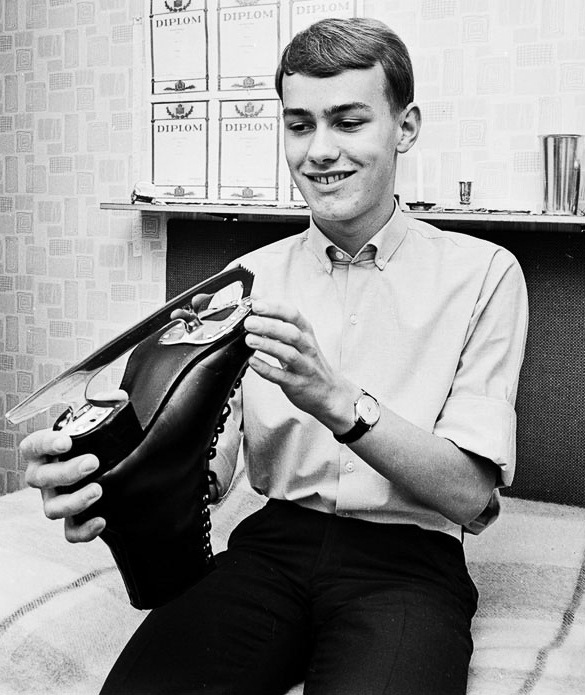

Personal information
- Full name: Nils Håkon Thomas Callerud
- Born: 15 February 1949 (age 77) Stockholm, Sweden
- Height: 1.82 m (5 ft 11 1/2 in)

Figure skating career
- Country: Sweden
- Retired: 1971

Nils Håkon Thomas Callerud (born 15 February 1949) is a Swedish former competitive figure skater. A three-time Nordic champion, he represented Sweden at the 1968 Winter Olympics in Grenoble and at four European Championships.

== Competitive highlights ==
International
Event	1966	1967	1968	1969	1970	1971
Winter Olympics			27th			
European Champ.			20th	20th	20th	17th
Nordics	3rd	2nd	2nd	1st	1st	1st
National
Swedish Champ.	3rd	2nd	1st	1st	1st	1st
