= Peter Dalby =

British figure skater

Figure skating career
- Country: Great Britain
Medal record
Representing Great Britain
Figure skating: Ice dancing
European Championships
| Bronze medal – third place | 1972 Gothenburg | Ice dancing |

Peter Dalby is a British figure skater who competed in ice dance.

Partnered with Janet Sawbridge, he won bronze at the 1972 European Figure Skating Championships.

== Competitive highlights ==
With Janet Sawbridge

International
| Event | 1971 | 1972 | 1973 | 1974 |
|---|---|---|---|---|
| World Championships | | 4th | 4th | 5th |
| European Championships | 5th | 3rd | 4th | 4th |
National
| British Championships | | 1st | 2nd | |
