= Ray Wilson (figure skater) =

British figure skater

Personal information
- Nationality: British
- Born: 22 May 1944 (age 81) London, England

Sport
- Sport: Figure skating

Ray Wilson (born 22 May 1944) is a British figure skater. He competed in the pairs event at the 1968 Winter Olympics.
