= Janet Sawbridge =

British figure skater (1947–2021)

Personal information
- Born: 1947 Birmingham, England, United Kingdom
- Died: 5 March 2021 (aged 73–74) United Kingdom

Figure skating career
- Country: Great Britain
- Partner: David Hickinbottom; Jon Lane; Peter Dalby
- Retired: c. 1975
Medal record
Representing Great Britain
Figure skating: Ice dancing
World Championships
Silver medal – second place	1965 Colorado Springs	Ice dancing
Bronze medal – third place	1964 Dortmund	Ice dancing
Bronze medal – third place	1968 Geneva	Ice dancing
European Championships
Silver medal – second place	1964 Grenoble	Ice dancing
Silver medal – second place	1965 Moscow	Ice dancing
Silver medal – second place	1969 Garmisch- Partenkirchen	Ice dancing
Bronze medal – third place	1963 Budapest	Ice dancing
Bronze medal – third place	1968 Västerås	Ice dancing
Bronze medal – third place	1972 Gothenburg	Ice dancing

Janet Anne Sawbridge MBE (1947 – 5 March 2021) was a British ice dancer and figure skating coach. Partnered with David Hickinbottom, she won bronze at the 1964 World Figure Skating Championships and silver at the 1965 World Figure Skating Championships. Partnered with Jon Lane, she won bronze at the 1968 World Figure Skating Championships. As a coach, she was known for pairing Jayne Torvill and Christopher Dean (Torvill and Dean).

== Competitive highlights ==
=== With David Hickinbottom ===
International
Event	1963	1964	1965
World Championships	4th	3rd	2nd
European Championships	3rd	2nd	2nd
National
British Championships	2nd	1st	1st

=== With Jon Lane ===
International
Event	1966	1967	1968	1969	1970	1971
World Championships	6th	4th	3rd	4th	7th	6th
European Championships	6th	4th	3rd	2nd		
National
British Championships	3rd	3rd	3rd	2nd		

=== With Peter Dalby ===
International
Event	1971	1972	1973	1974
World Championships		4th	4th	5th
European Championships	5th	3rd	4th	4th
National
British Championships		1st	2nd	
