= Evelyne Schneider =

Austrian pair skater

Personal information
- Full name: Evelyne Schneider
- Other names: Evelyne Scharf
- Born: 23 February 1950 (age 76) Waidhofen an der Ybbs, Austria
- Height: 1.68 m (5 ft 6 in)

Figure skating career
- Country: Austria
- Retired: 1970s

Evelyne Schneider (married name: Rossoukhi; born 23 February 1950 in Waidhofen an der Ybbs, Lower Austria) is an Austrian former pair skater. With partner Wilhelm Bietak, she represented Austria at the 1968 Winter Olympics, where they placed 15th.

== Competitive highlights ==
=== With Bietak ===
International
Event	1967	1968	1969
Winter Olympics		15th	
World Championships	12th		13th
European Championships	13th	12th	10th
National
Austrian Championships	1st	1st	1st

=== With Dedovich ===
International
Event	1966
European Championships	15th
