= Wilhelm Bietak =

Austrian figure skater

Personal information
- Other names: Willy Bietak
- Born: 23 May 1947 (age 79) Vöcklabruck, Austria
- Height: 183 cm (6.00 ft)

Figure skating career
- Country: Austria
- Retired: 1970s

Wilhelm "Willy" Bietak (born 23 May 1947) is an Austrian pair skater and skating event producer. During his career, he competed internationally with partners Evelyne Schneider and Gerlinde Schönbauer, appearing at two Winter Olympics. He was inducted into the World Figure Skating Hall of Fame in 2009.

== Personal life ==
Bietak was born on 23 May 1947 in Vöcklabruck, Upper Austria. He is the son of Austrian figure skater Ilse Hornung.

== Career ==
With Gerlinde Schönbauer, he represented Austria at the 1964 Winter Olympics, where they placed 12th. Their partnership ended in 1966.

He then teamed up with Evelyne Schneider. They represented Austria at the 1968 Winter Olympics, where they placed 15th.

Following his retirement from competitive skating, he founded Willy Bietak Productions, a production company headquartered in Santa Monica, California. The company produces skating events and temporary ice rinks for events.

He was inducted into the World Figure Skating Hall of Fame in 2009.

== Competitive highlights ==
=== With Schneider ===
International
Event	1967	1968	1969	1970	1971
Winter Olympics		15th			
World Championships	12th		13th	13th	WD
European Championships	13th	12th	10th	13th	14th
Winter Universiade				3rd	
National
Austrian Championships	1st	1st	1st	1st	1st

=== With Schönbauer ===
International
Event	1963	1964	1965	1966
Winter Olympics		12th		
World Championships		11th	10th	
European Championships	14th	9th	9th	11th
National
Austrian Championships	1st	1st	1st	1st
