= 1971 World Figure Skating Championships =

Annual figure skating competition held in 1971

- Type: ISU Championship
- Date: February 23 – 28
- Season: 1970–71
- Location: Lyon, France
- Venue: Palais des Sports de Gerland

Champions
- Men's singles: (Czechoslovakia) Ondrej Nepela
- Ladies' singles: (Austria) Beatrix Schuba
- Pairs: (Soviet Union) Irina Rodnina / Aleksey Ulanov
- Ice dance: (Soviet Union) Lyudmila Pakhomova / Aleksandr Gorshkov
- Previous: 1970 World Championships
- Next: 1972 World Championships

The 1971 World Figure Skating Championships were held in Lyon, France, from February 23 to 28. At the event, sanctioned by the International Skating Union, medals were awarded in men's singles, ladies' singles, pair skating, and ice dance.

== Medal table ==
* Host nation (France)

Rank	Nation	Gold	Silver	Bronze	Total
1	Soviet Union	2	1	1	4
2	Austria	1	0	0	1
2	Czechoslovakia	1	0	0	1
4	United States	0	1	2	3
5	France*	0	1	0	1
5	West Germany	0	1	0	1
7	Canada	0	0	1	1
Totals (7 entries)		4	4	4	12

== Results ==
=== Men ===
Rank	Name	CP	FP	Points	Placings
1	(Czechoslovakia) Ondrej Nepela	1	1	2737.5	12
2	(France) Patrick Péra	2	3	2706.7	18
3	(Soviet Union) Sergey Chetverukhin	3	8	2629.3	34
4	(East Germany) Jan Hoffmann	4	2	2632.7	34
5	(United States) John Petkevich	5	4	2598.9	44
6	(United Kingdom) Haig Oundjian	6	7	2551.0	58
7	(Soviet Union) Yuriy Ovchinnikov	7	9	2529.6	66
8	(United States) Kenneth Shelley	9	5	2540.7	70
9	(United States) Gordon McKellen	11	10	2498.4	89
10	(France) Didier Gailhaguet	10	11	2502.1	89
11	(Canada) Toller Cranston	15	6		90
12	(Austria) Günter Anderl	8	14		115
13	(France) Jacques Mrozek	14	11		116
14	(United Kingdom) John Curry	13	13		117
15	(Switzerland) Daniel Höner	12	16		137
16	(Czechoslovakia) Jozef Žídek	18	15		148
17	(Czechoslovakia) Zdeněk Pazdírek	17	19		155
18	(Italy) Stefano Bargauan	16	18		157.5
19	(West Germany) Klaus Grimmelt	21	17		167.5
20	(Japan) Yutaka Higuchi	19	20		180
21	(Romania) György Fazekas	20	21		186

- Referee: (Hungary) Elemér Terták
- Assistant Referee: (Canada) Donald Gilchrist

Judges:

- (Italy) Michele Beltrami
- (Romania) Vera Curceac
- (Soviet Union) Tatyana Danilenko
- (Czechoslovakia) Milan Duchón
- (United States) Norman E. Fuller
- (France) Monique Georgelin
- (Japan) Kinuko Ueno
- (East Germany) Helga Wiecki
- (United Kingdom) Geoffrey Yates

=== Ladies ===
The results of the women's free skate caused an uproar in the arena and were one step towards the demise of compulsory figures. Janet Lynn skated a clean free skate that was well-loved by the crowd, and she placed first in that segment with scores ranging from 5.8 to 6.0; however, due to her scores in the compulsory figures segment of the competition, which were not aired on television, she could not advance to a medal position despite her performance. Coverage on the Wide World of Sports showed Lynn looking at the medalist stand. The crowd in the arena booed; Pierre Brunet, a well-known coach, approached Lynn and told her to take a bow to appease the spectators, a move she later regretted as distracting from the medalists: "I have not been in touch with Karen or Trixi, but I've apologized to Julie for that because it was wrong for me to do that. I was a young girl; I should have had better judgment and said no, but my superiors told me that's what I needed to do."

Rank	Name	CP	FP	Points	Placings
1	(Austria) Beatrix Schuba	1	7	2763.0	10
2	(United States) Julie Holmes	2	5	2697.3	24.5
3	(Canada) Karen Magnussen	4	2	2697.7	27
4	(United States) Janet Lynn	5	1	2680.0	34
5	(Italy) Rita Trapanese	3	8	2623.6	47.5
6	(East Germany) Sonja Morgenstern	9	3	2606.6	52
7	(Hungary) Zsuzsa Almássy	6	4	2599.9	57
8	(Switzerland) Charlotte Walter	8	14	2480.7	83
9	(East Germany) Christine Errath	13	6	2493.5	86
10	(United States) Suna Murray	14	9	2475.0	91
11	(Soviet Union) Yelena Aleksandrova	10	13	2450.5	100
12	(United Kingdom) Patricia Dodd	7	16		103
13	(Japan) Kazumi Yamashita	12	11		116
14	(Czechoslovakia) Ľudmila Bezáková	11	15		122
15	(United Kingdom) Jean Scott	15	10		132
16	(Canada) Diane Hall	19	12		132
17	(Sweden) Anita Johansson	16	18		145
18	(West Germany) Judith Beyer	20	17		159
19	(Canada) Ruth Hutchinson	17	20		168
20	(Austria) Sonja Balun	22	19		177
21	(France) Joëlle Cartaux	18	22		188
22	(Italy) Cinzia Frosio	21	21		197

- Referee: (Czechoslovakia) Josef Dědič
- Assistant Referee: (Italy) Sonia Bianchetti

Judges:

- (West Germany) Eva von Gamm
- (Austria) Ludwig Gassner
- (Canada) Barbara Graham
- (East Germany) Walburga Grimm
- (Hungary) Éva György
- (Soviet Union) Nonna Nestogina
- (Sweden) Elof Niklasson
- (Italy) Giorgio Siniscalco
- (United States) Mary Wright

=== Pairs ===
Rank	Name	SP	FP	Points	Placings
1	(Soviet Union) Irina Rodnina / Aleksey Ulanov	2	1	419.4	11
2	(Soviet Union) Lyudmila Smirnova / Andrey Suraykin	1	2	418.9	17
3	(United States) Alicia Starbuck / Kenneth Shelley	3	3	410.3	29
4	(East Germany) Manuela Groß / Uwe Kagelmann	4	4	404.1	37
5	(West Germany) Almut Lehmann / Herbert Wiesinger	5	5	399.7	48
6	(United States) Melissa Militano / Mark Militano	6	6	394.9	56
7	(East Germany) Annette Kansy / Axel Salzmann	8	7	392.3	62
8	(Soviet Union) Galina Karelina / Georgiy Proskurin	6	8	387.9	76
9	(Canada) Sandra Bezic / Val Bezic	9	9	384.1	80
10	(Poland) Grażyna Osmańska / Adam Brodecki	11	10	381.0	88
11	(United States) Barbara Brown / Doug Berndt	12	11		98
12	(West Germany) Brunhilde Baßler / Eberhard Rausch	10	12		104
13	(United Kingdom) Linda Connolly / Colin Taylforth	13	13		118
14	(France) Florence Cahn / Jean-Roland Racle	14	14		121
15	(Japan) Kotoe Nagasawa / Hiroshi Nagakubo	17	15		137
16	(Switzerland) Karin Künzle / Christian Künzle	18	16		146
17	(Poland) Teresa Skrzek / Piotr Szczypa	16	17		149
WD	(Austria) Evelyne Schneider / Wilhelm Bietak	15			DNF

- Referee: (Switzerland) Karl Enderlin
- Assistant Referee: (France) Néri Valdes

Judges:

- (United Kingdom) Pamela Davis
- (United States) Norman E. Fuller
- (West Germany) Eva von Gamm
- (Austria) Edwin Kucharz
- (East Germany) Carla Listing
- (Soviet Union) Nonna Nestogina
- (France) Monique Petis
- (Switzerland) Jürg Wilhelm
- (Poland) Maria Zuchowicz

=== Ice dance ===
Rank	Name	CD	FD	Points	Placings
1	(Soviet Union) Lyudmila Pakhomova / Aleksandr Gorshkov	1	1	515.8	16
2	(West Germany) Angelika Buck / Erich Buck	3	2	512.7	20
3	(United States) Judy Schwomeyer / James Sladky	2	3	514.5	21
4	(United Kingdom) Susan Getty / Roy Bradshaw	4	4	502.9	33
5	(Soviet Union) Tetyana Voytyuk / Vyacheslav Zhyhalyn	5	5	490.1	47
6	(United Kingdom) Janet Sawbridge / Peter Dalby	6	7	484.4	58
7	(United Kingdom) Hilary Green / Glynn Watts	10	8	473.3	71
8	(Soviet Union) Yelena Zharkova / Gennadiy Karponosov	7	6	475.3	71
9	(United States) Anne Millier / Harvey Millier	9	10	467.5	80
10	(United States) Mary Campbell / Johnny Johns	8	9	466.5	88
11	(Canada) Louise Lind / Barry Soper	11	11		103
12	(Czechoslovakia) Diana Skotnická / Martin Skotnický	13	12		109.5
13	(France) Anne-Claude Wolfers / Roland Mars	12	13		113
14	(Poland) Teresa Weyna / Piotr Bojańczyk	14	14		117.5
15	(Hungary) Ilona Berecz / István Sugár	15	16		134
16	(Italy) Matilde Ciccia / Lamberto Ceserani	16	15		142
17	(Switzerland) Tatiana Grossen / Alessandro Grossen	17	17		157
18	(West Germany) Astrid Kopp / Axel Kopp	18	18		158
19	(West Germany) Angelika Wiesner / Hans-Jürgen Wiesner	19	20		174
20	(Austria) Brigitte Scheijbal / Kurt Jaschek	20	19		177

- Referee: (Czechoslovakia) Emil Skákala
- Assistant Referee: (France) Henri Meudec

Judges:

- (Canada) George J. Blundun
- (Soviet Union) Igor Kabanov
- (Hungary) Klára Kozári
- (France) Lysiane Lauret
- (United Kingdom) George Marsh
- (Czechoslovakia) Dagmar Řeháková
- (West Germany) Erika Schiechtl
- (United States) Mary Wright
- (Poland) Maria Zuchowicz
