= Figure skating at the 1972 Winter Olympics =

Figure skating at the XI Winter Olympics
- Type: Olympic Games
- Venue: Makomanai Skating Rink; Mikaho Indoor Skating Rink

Champions
- Men's singles: (Czechoslovakia) Ondrej Nepela
- Ladies' singles: (Austria) Beatrix Schuba
- Pairs: (Soviet Union) Irina Rodnina / Alexei Ulanov
- Previous: 1968 Winter Olympics
- Next: 1976 Winter Olympics

The figure skating events at the 1972 Winter Olympics were held at the Makomanai Skating Rink and the Mikaho Indoor Skating Rink.

The results of both the men's and ladies' singles events were dominated by placements in the compulsory figures, which at the time were nominally worth 50% of the total score but in fact weighted more heavily than the free skating due to being judged using a wider range of marks.

In the men's event, Ondrej Nepela, the winner of the compulsory figures segment, took the gold in spite of placing only 4th in the free skating after falling on his triple loop jump. The free skating winner was Sergei Chetverukhin, who skated one of his best performances at this event to take the silver medal. Patrick Péra, second in the figures, had a poor free skating in which he fell on a triple salchow jump early in his program and then made other mistakes. Nonetheless, the weight given to figures allowed him to take the bronze medal ahead of John Misha Petkevich, Kenneth Shelley, and Toller Cranston, who all skated dynamic programs with at least one cleanly landed triple jump apiece.

The effect of the figures was even more pronounced in the ladies' competition, where gold medal winner Beatrix Schuba placed only 7th in the free skating, performing most of the double jumps, however no double axel or double loop. The free skating was won by Janet Lynn, who received a perfect mark of 6.0 despite falling on a flying sit spin. Lynn's skating captivated the Japanese audience, especially when she got up smiling from her fall. Lynn took the bronze while Karen Magnussen, second in the free skating with a strong performance, took the silver. The third place skater in the free skating, Sonja Morgenstern, included a triple salchow in her program, which at this time was very rare for a female skater. She placed 6th overall.

The pairs competition was a tight battle between the two top Russian teams. Irina Rodnina / Alexei Ulanov did not skate their best, with Ulanov missing his required double salchow jump in the short program and Rodnina making an error in the jump combination at the beginning of their free skating. They eventually won a 6–3 decision over their teammates Liudmila Smirnova / Andrei Suraikin. The bronze medal team of Manuela Groß / Uwe Kagelmann made no major errors and received the highest technical merit marks from some of the judges for their program. Their elements included a throw double axel which at this time was rarely attempted.

== Medal table ==
Rank	Nation	Gold	Silver	Bronze	Total
1	Soviet Union	1	2	0	3
2	Austria	1	0	0	1
2	Czechoslovakia	1	0	0	1
4	Canada	0	1	0	1
5	East Germany	0	0	1	1
5	France	0	0	1	1
5	United States	0	0	1	1
Totals (7 entries)		3	3	3	9

=== Participating NOCs ===
Eighteen nations participated in figure skating at the 1972 Games.

- Austria
- Canada
- Czechoslovakia
- East Germany
- France
- Great Britain
- Hungary
- Italy
- Japan
- Netherlands
- Poland
- Romania
- South Korea
- Soviet Union
- Sweden
- Switzerland
- United States
- West Germany

== Results ==
=== Men ===
Rank	Name	Nation	CF	FS	Points	Places
1	Ondrej Nepela	Czechoslovakia	1	4	2739.1	9
2	Sergei Chetverukhin	Soviet Union	3	1	2672.4	20
3	Patrick Péra	France	2	8	2653.1	28
4	Kenneth Shelley	United States	5	3	2596.0	43
5	John Misha Petkevich	United States	6	2	2591.5	47
6	Jan Hoffmann	East Germany	4	10	2567.6	55
7	Haig Oundjian	Great Britain	9	7	2538.8	65
8	Vladimir Kovalev	Soviet Union	7	11	2521.6	80
9	Toller Cranston	Canada	12	5	2517.2	80.5
10	John Curry	Great Britain	8	12	2512.2	85
11	Gordon McKellen	United States	10	9	2511.0	89
12	Yuri Ovchinnikov	Soviet Union	15	6	2477.5	104.5
13	Didier Gailhaguet	France	11	13	2440.9	114
14	Jacques Mrozek	France	13	14	2401.3	126
15	Günter Anderl	Austria	14	16	2313.6	138
16	Yutaka Higuchi	Japan	16	15	2309.7	140
17	Gheorghe Fazekas	Romania	17	17	2094.0	153

Referee:

- Sonia Bianchetti

Assistant Referee:

- Masao Hasegawa

Judges:

- (France) Monique Georgelin
- (East Germany) Helga von Wiecki
- (Canada) Donald B. Cruikshank
- (United Kingdom) Mollie Phillips
- (Austria) Walter Malek
- (Czechoslovakia) Emil Skákala
- (Japan) Goro Ishimaru
- (United States) Dora May Coy
- (Soviet Union) Tatiana Danilenko
- (Poland) Maria Zuchowicz (substitute)

=== Ladies ===
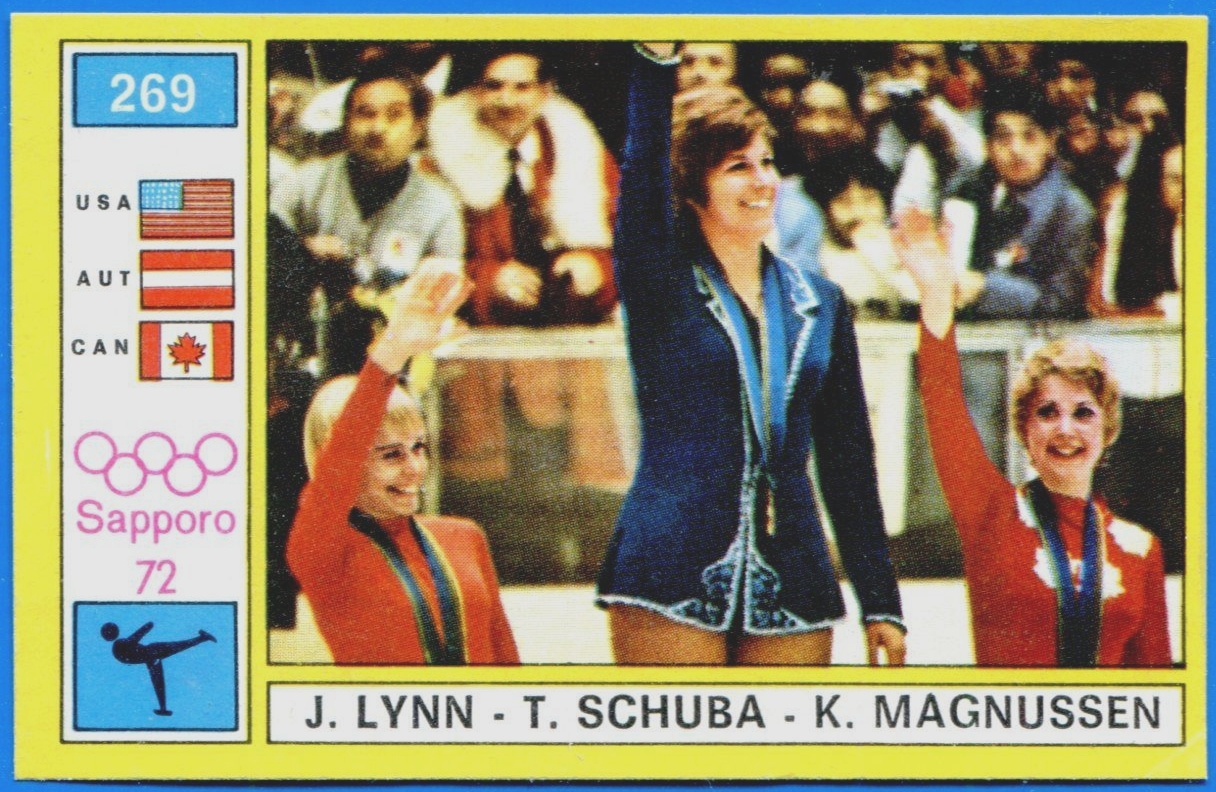

In the ladies' event, American skater Janet Lynn won not only a bronze medal, but also tremendous popularity among Japanese audiences because of her artistic free program, as to make appearance on the cover of "Olympic Winter Games, Sapporo 1972" photo books published in Japan, and even on Japanese TV commercials later.

Rank	Name	Nation	CF	FS	Points	Places
1	Beatrix Schuba	Austria	1	7	2751.5	9
2	Karen Magnussen	Canada	3	2	2673.2	23
3	Janet Lynn	United States	4	1	2663.1	27
4	Julie Lynn Holmes	United States	2	8	2627.0	39
5	Zsuzsa Almássy	Hungary	5	4	2592.4	47
6	Sonja Morgenstern	East Germany	8	3	2579.4	53
7	Rita Trapanese	Italy	6	6	2574.8	55
8	Christine Errath	East Germany	11	5	2489.3	78
9	Charlotte Walter	Switzerland	7	13	2467.3	86
10	Kazumi Yamashita	Japan	10	10	2449.9	93
11	Jean Scott	Great Britain	9	11	2436.8	101
12	Suna Murray	United States	13	9	2426.2	102
13	Catherine Irwin	Canada	12	12	2383.4	116
14	Isabel de Navarre	West Germany	16	14	2340.0	128
15	Anita Johansson	Sweden	14	15	2349.3	131
16	Dianne de Leeuw	Netherlands	15	16	2298.7	143
17	Sonja Balun	Austria	17	17	2260.6	148
18	Marina Sanaya	Soviet Union	19	18	2198.6	160
19	Chang Myung-su	South Korea	18	19	2117.0	171

Referee:

- Karl Enderlin

Assistant Referee:

- Kinuka Ueno

Judges:

- (Italy) Michele Beltrami
- (Soviet Union) Valentin Piseev
- (East Germany) Walburga Grimm
- (Sweden) Ingegärd Lago
- (Austria) Han Kutschera
- (Canada) Joan MacLagan
- (United States) Marcella Willis
- (Japan) Ryuchi Obitani
- (Hungary) Klára Kozári
- (United Kingdom) Pamela Davis (substitute)

=== Pairs ===
Rank	Name	Nation	SP	FS	Points	Places
1	Irina Rodnina / Alexei Ulanov	Soviet Union	1	1	420.4	12
2	Liudmila Smirnova / Andrei Suraikin	Soviet Union	2	2	419.4	15
3	Manuela Groß / Uwe Kagelmann	East Germany	3	3	411.8	29
4	JoJo Starbuck / Kenneth Shelley	United States	4	4	406.8	35
5	Almut Lehmann / Herbert Wiesinger	West Germany	5	6	399.8	52
6	Irina Cherniaeva / Vasili Blagov	Soviet Union	6	5	399.1	52
7	Melissa Militano / Mark Militano	United States	8	7	393.0	65.5
8	Annette Kansy / Axel Salzmann	East Germany	7	8	392.6	68
9	Sandra Bezic / Val Bezic	Canada	9	9	384.9	84
10	Corinna Halke / Eberhard Rausch	West Germany	10	10	381.1	87
11	Grazyna Kostrzewinska / Adam Brodecki	Poland	11	11	377.8	95.5
12	Barbara Brown / Douglas Berndt	United States	12	13	366.9	114
13	Florence Cahn / Jean Roland Racle	France	13	12	364.5	116
14	Linda Connolly / Colin Taylforth	Great Britain	14	14	360.6	126
15	Mary Petrie / John Hubbell	Canada	15	15	358.5	129
16	Kotoe Nagasawa / Hiroshi Nagakubo	Japan	16	16	345.5	144

Referee:

- Elemér Terták

Assistant Referee:

- Donald H. Gilchrist

Judges:

- (Soviet Union) Valentin Piseev
- (Canada) Joan MacLagan
- (East Germany) Walburga Grimm
- (Italy) Maria Zuchowicz
- (United States) Marcella Willis
- (Japan) Kikuko Minami
- (United Kingdom) Pamela Davis
- (West Germany) Erika Schiechtl
- (France) Monique Georgelin
- (Austria) Walter Malek (substitute)
