= 1972 World Figure Skating Championships =

Annual figure skating competition held in 1972

- Type: ISU Championship
- Date: March 7 – 11
- Season: 1971–72
- Location: Calgary, Alberta, Canada
- Venue: Stampede Corral

Champions
- Men's singles: (Czechoslovakia) Ondrej Nepela
- Ladies' singles: (Austria) Beatrix Schuba
- Pairs: (Soviet Union) Irina Rodnina / Aleksey Ulanov
- Ice dance: (Soviet Union) Lyudmila Pakhomova / Aleksandr Gorshkov
- Previous: 1971 World Championships
- Next: 1973 World Championships

The 1972 World Figure Skating Championships were held at the Stampede Corral in Calgary, Canada from March 7 to 11. At the event, sanctioned by the International Skating Union, medals were awarded in men's singles, ladies' singles, pair skating, and ice dance.

A day before the start of the competition, Irina Rodnina / Aleksey Ulanov had an accident on a lift; Rodnina was hospitalized with a concussion and an intracranial hematoma but went on to compete and win the gold medal. It was Rodnina/Ulanov's final competition together. Ulanov would team up with the silver medalist, Lyudmila Smirnova.

== Medal table ==
* Host nation (Canada)

Rank	Nation	Gold	Silver	Bronze	Total
1	Soviet Union	2	2	1	5
2	Austria	1	0	0	1
2	Czechoslovakia	1	0	0	1
4	Canada*	0	1	0	1
4	West Germany	0	1	0	1
6	United States	0	0	3	3
Totals (6 entries)		4	4	4	12

== Results ==
=== Men ===
Rank	Name	CF	FS	Points	Places
1	(Czechoslovakia) Ondrej Nepela	1	3	2722.8	9
2	(Soviet Union) Sergey Chetverukhin	2	2	2673.8	19
3	(Soviet Union) Vladimir Kovalyov	3	5	2607.5	34
4	(United States) John Petkevich	5	4	2585.5	39
5	(Canada) Toller Cranston	9	1	2566.1	45
6	(East Germany) Jan Hoffmann	4	9	2559.7	59
7	(United States) Kenneth Shelley	7	6	2538.7	67
8	(United States) Gordon McKellen	10	8	2528.3	69
9	(United Kingdom) John Curry	6	7	2534.8	70
10	(Soviet Union) Sergey Volkov	8	10	2499.0	86
11	(France) Jacques Mrozek	11	11	2448.8	100
12	(Czechoslovakia) Zdeněk Pazdírek	14	12		116
13	(France) Didier Gailhauguet	12	13		116
14	(Austria) Josef Schneider	13	15		128
15	(Japan) Yutaka Higuchi	16	14		136
16	(Czechoslovakia) Jozef Žídek	17	16		141
17	(Italy) Stefano Bargauan	15	17		144
18	(West Germany) Harald Kuhn	19	18		166
19	(Finland) Pekka Leskinen	18	19		167
WD	(United Kingdom) Haig Oundjian				DNS

- Referee: (Canada) Donald Gilchrist
- Assistant Referee: (Italy) Sonia Bianchetti

Judges:

- (Czechoslovakia) Gerhardt Bubník
- (United States) Dorothy Burkholder
- (Soviet Union) Tatyana Danilenko
- (Japan) Masao Hasegawa
- (Austria) Franz Heinlein
- (Canada) William Lewis
- (France) Monique Petis
- (United Kingdom) Mollie Phillips
- (East Germany) Helga Wiecki
- (West Germany) János Zsigmondy (substitute)

=== Ladies ===
Rank	Name	CF	FS	Points	Places
1	(Austria) Beatrix Schuba	1	9	2778.5	13
2	(Canada) Karen Magnussen	2	2	2745.2	16
3	(United States) Janet Lynn	3	1	2713.0	25
4	(Hungary) Zsuzsa Almássy	4	6	2643.3	37
5	(East Germany) Sonja Morgenstern	6	3	2581.1	52
6	(United Kingdom) Jean Scott	5	10	2555.1	57
7	(United States) Dorothy Hamill	8	5	2548.3	62
8	(United States) Suna Murray	7	7	2517.5	74
9	(Canada) Cathy Irwin	9	8	2499.9	79
10	(East Germany) Christine Errath	11	4	2519.9	81
11	(Czechoslovakia) Ľudmila Bezáková	10	13	2426.9	102
12	(Switzerland) Karin Iten	12	16	2387.8	118
13	(West Germany) Gerti Schanderl	15	11	2385.3	119
14	(Italy) Cinzia Frosio	13	12	2380.1	120
15	(Canada) Darya Prichun	14	14	2370.9	127
16	(France) Marie-Claude Bierre	17	15	2319.9	146
17	(Netherlands) Dianne de Leeuw	16	19	2296.6	151
18	(South Korea) Chang Myung-su	18	18	2221.6	169
19	(Australia) Sharon Burley	19	21	2195.8	175
20	(Japan) Shūko Takeyama	20	20	2193.3	178
21	(Soviet Union) Marina Sanaya	21	17	2189.3	178

- Referee: (Czechoslovakia) Josef Dědič
- Assistant Referee: (Hungary) Elemér Terták

Judges:

- (Hungary) Zoltán Balázs
- (France) Jeanine Donnier-Blanc
- (Czechoslovakia) Milan Duchón (substitute)
- (Canada) Suzanne Francis
- (Austria) Ludwig Gassner
- (East Germany) Walburga Grimm
- (West Germany) Wilhelm Kahle
- (United States) Ramona McIntyre
- (Italy) Giovanni de Mori
- (Switzerland) René Schlageter

=== Pairs ===
Rank	Name	SP		FS		Points	Places
1	(Soviet Union) Irina Rodnina / Aleksey Ulanov	1	106.2	1	315.6	421.8	9
2	(Soviet Union) Lyudmila Smirnova / Andrey Suraykin	2	104.4	3	312.3	416.7	21.5
3	(United States) Alicia Starbuck / Kenneth Shelley	5	99.6	2	312.6	412.2	28.5
4	(East Germany) Manuela Groß / Uwe Kagelmann	3	102.0	4	307.8	409.8	38
5	(West Germany) Almut Lehmann / Herbert Wiesinger	4	100.9	5	306.9	407.8	42
6	(Soviet Union) Irina Chernyayeva / Vasiliy Blagov	6	99.5	6	304.5	404.0	55
7	(East Germany) Annette Kansy / Axel Salzmann	8	98.2	7	300.9	399.1	68
8	(Canada) Sandra Bezic / Val Bezic	7	98.3	8	301.2	399.5	70
9	(United States) Melissa Militano / Mark Militano	9	96.6	9	298.5	395.1	76
10	(West Germany) Corinna Halke / Eberhard Rausch	11	94.8	10	268.9	363.7	95
11	(Canada) Mary Petrie / John Hubbell	13	92.7	11	285.0	377.7	102
12	(Poland) Grażyna Osmańska / Adam Brodecki	10	96.5	12	284.1	380.6	106
13	(West Germany) Gabriele Cieplik / Reinhard Ketterer	12	94.4	13	280.8	375.2	114
14	(United States) Barbara Brown / Douglas Berndt	14	90.9	14	278.4	369.3	123
15	(United Kingdom) Linda Connolly / Colin Taylforth	15	90.5	15	272.4	362.9	132

- Referee: (Switzerland) Karl Enderlin
- Assistant Referee: (United States) Henry M. Beatty

Judges:

- (Netherlands) Elsbeth Bon
- (United Kingdom) Pamela Davis
- (Canada) Suzanne Francis
- (East Germany) Walburga Grimm
- (Soviet Union) Valentin Piseyev
- (United States) Ardelle Sanderson
- (Switzerland) René Schlageter (substitute)
- (Finland) Inkeri Soininen
- (Poland) Maria Zuchowicz
- (West Germany) János Zsigmondy

=== Ice dance ===
Rank	Name	CD		FD		Points	Places
1	(Soviet Union) Lyudmila Pakhomova / Aleksandr Gorshkov	1	251.9	1	262.7	514.6	14
2	(West Germany) Angelika Buck / Erich Buck	2	250.7	2	261.3	512.0	17
3	(United States) Judy Schwomeyer / James Sladky	3	248.7	3	260.0	508.7	24
4	(United Kingdom) Janet Sawbridge / Peter Dalby	4	242.0	4	255.0	495.0	38
5	(Soviet Union) Tetyana Voytyuk / Vyacheslav Zhyhalyn	5	234.9	5	250.8	485.7	46
6	(United Kingdom) Hilary Green / Glynn Watts	6	233.3	6	250.9	484.2	50
7	(United States) Anne Millier / Harvey Millier	7	221.9	7	244.9	466.8	67
8	(Soviet Union) Yelena Zharkova / Gennadiy Karponosov	8	219.1	8	242.3	461.4	75
9	(Canada) Louise Lind / Barry Soper	9	217.9	9	241.0	458.9	80
10	(United States) Mary Campbell / Johnny Johns	10	216.1	10	237.2	453.3	91
11	(Czechoslovakia) Diana Skotnická / Martin Skotnický	11	212.6	11	234.8	447.4	99
12	(France) Anne-Claude Wolfers / Roland Mars	12	209.5	13	226.7	436.2	108
13	(Poland) Teresa Weyna / Piotr Bojańczyk	13	208.0	12	226.7	434.7	110
14	(West Germany) Sylvia Fuchs / Michael Fuchs	14	197.7	14	215.5	413.2	126
15	(West Germany) Astrid Kopp / Axel Kopp	15	195.3	15	208.2	403.5	135
16	(Japan) Keiko Achiwa / Yasuyuki Noto	16	182.3	16	195.8	378.1	144

- Referee: (United Kingdom) Lawrence Demmy
- Assistant Referee: (Canada) George J. Blundun

Judges:

- (Hungary) Zoltán Balázs
- (United Kingdom) Pamela Davis
- (Czechoslovakia) Milan Duchón
- (Soviet Union) Igor Kabanov
- (France) Claude Lambert
- (Canada) Audrey Moore
- (West Germany) Eugen Romminger
- (United States) Benjamin T. Wright
- (Poland) Maria Zuchowicz

== Sources ==
- The Calgary Gerald (Calgary, Alberta, March 8, 9, 10, 11, 13, 1972)
