= Demise and revival of compulsory figures =

In international figure skating

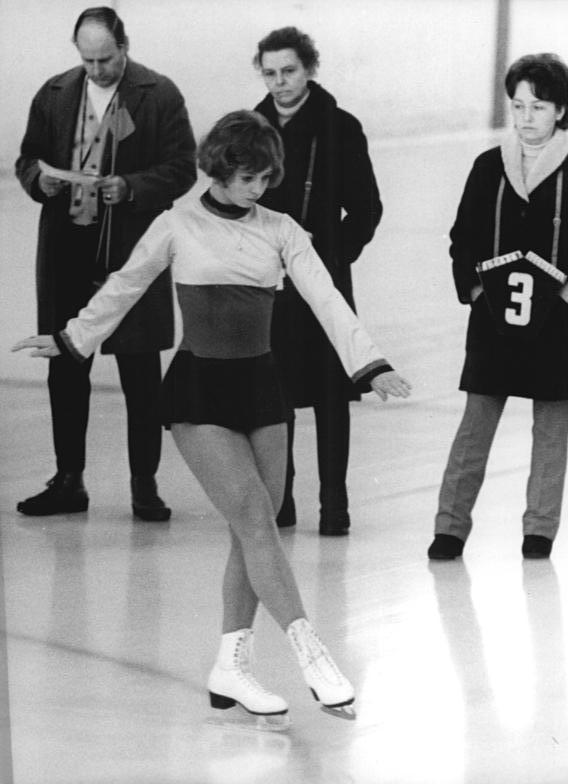
Sonja Morgenstern from Germany skates a compulsory figure, 1971

The demise and revival of compulsory figures occurred, respectively, in 1990, when the International Skating Union (ISU) removed compulsory figures from international single skating competitions, and beginning in 2015, when the first competition focusing entirely on figures took place. Compulsory figures, which is defined as the "circular patterns which skaters trace on the ice to demonstrate skill in placing clean turns evenly on round circles", dominated figure skating for the first 50 years of the sport, although they progressively declined in importance. Skaters would train for hours to learn and execute them well, and competing and judging figures would often take up to eight hours during competitions.

Judging scandals and the broadcasts of figure skating on television have been cited as the reason for the decline of figures. The U.S. was the last country to include figures in its competitions until 1999. The elimination of figures resulted in an increase of focus on the free skating segment and in the domination of younger girls in the sport. Most skaters stopped training with figures, although many coaches continued to teach figures and skaters continued to practice them because figures taught basic skating skills and gave skaters an advantage in developing alignment, core strength, body control, and discipline.

A revival of compulsory figures began in 2015, when the first World Figure Championship (renamed to the World Figure and Fancy Skating Championships in 2017) occurred in Lake Placid, New York. By 2023, nine championships had taken place. Judging was done blind, after the skaters left the ice, and without the judges knowing which competitor completed which figure. The championships were postponed in 2020 due to the COVID-19 pandemic, although workshops and seminars were conducted online. Karen Courtland Kelly, 1994 Olympian and figures expert, who founded the World Figure Sport Society (WFSS) and organized its figures championships, was credited with revitalizing figures. By 2020, the championship and the revitalization of figures were supported by many skaters, including U.S. Olympian Debi Thomas, who competed at the 2023 Championships.

== Demise of compulsory figures ==
Compulsory figures (or school figures) were formerly a segment of figure skating, and gave the sport its name. They are the "circular patterns which skaters trace on the ice to demonstrate skill in placing clean turns evenly on round circles". Until 1967, compulsory figures made up 60 percent of the total score at most competitions around the world. These figures continued to dominate the sport, although they steadily declined in importance, until the International Skating Union (ISU) voted to discontinue them as a part of competitions in 1990. Learning and training in compulsory figures instilled discipline and control; some in the figure skating community considered them necessary to teach skaters basic skills. Skaters would train for hours to learn and execute them well, and competing and judging figures would often take up to eight hours during competitions.

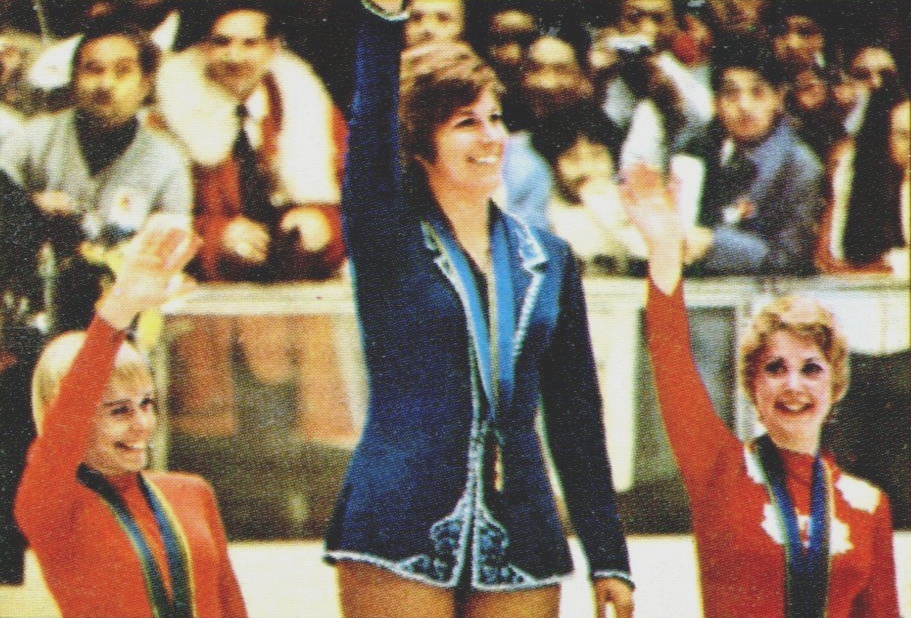
Trixie Schuba (center, at the 1972 Olympics), who excelled at compulsory figures

The number of figures skaters were required to trace in competition was first lowered from twelve to six in 1946. Compulsory figures began to be progressively devalued in 1967 when the values of both compulsory figures and free skating were changed to 50 percent. In 1973, the number of figures was decreased again from six to three, and their overall weight was decreased to 30 percent, to make room for the introduction of the short program. In 1977, the pool of possible figures from which those used in a competition were drawn decreased to six, while the number skaters competed remained at three.

Author James R. Hines states that the decrease in the importance of compulsory figures was due to "the unbalanced skating" of women skaters such as Beatrix "Trixi" Schuba of Austria, whom Hines called "the last great practitioner of compulsory figures". Schuba won several medals in the late 1960s and early 1970s based upon the strength of her figures, despite her lower results in free skating. As Hines states, "she could not be defeated under a scoring system that gave preference to figures". Before Schuba, discrepancies between a skater's ability in the figures and the free skating rarely attracted much notice; during her career, however, she defeated skaters such as Janet Lynn, who were more skilled in free skating, which viewers often found confusing. At the 1971 World Championships, for example, Schuba was 7th in the free skate and won the gold medal, while Lynn was first in the free skate but only fifth in the figures, which meant that mathematically she could not win a medal despite scores ranging from 5.8 to 6.0 for her free skate. The crowd booed the results at the victory ceremony.

Hines also credited television coverage of figure skating, which helped to increase the popularity of the sport, with the eventual demise of compulsory figures. Television audiences were not exposed to the compulsory figures segments of competitions, so they did not understand why the results contradicted what they saw in free skating segments. Sports writer Sandra Loosemore agreed, stating that television was "the driving force" for the rule changes regarding figures in 1968 and the years following. Figures were not televised because they were not exciting enough, so viewers "found it incomprehensible that competitions could be won by skaters who had built up huge leads in the figures portion of the event but gave mediocre performances in the part of the competition shown on TV". They were also difficult to capture on camera; while pieces on them were created for the 1980, 1984, and 1988 Olympics, capturing figures required camera operators to shoot from above, and the tracings were not always visible, especially on white ice.

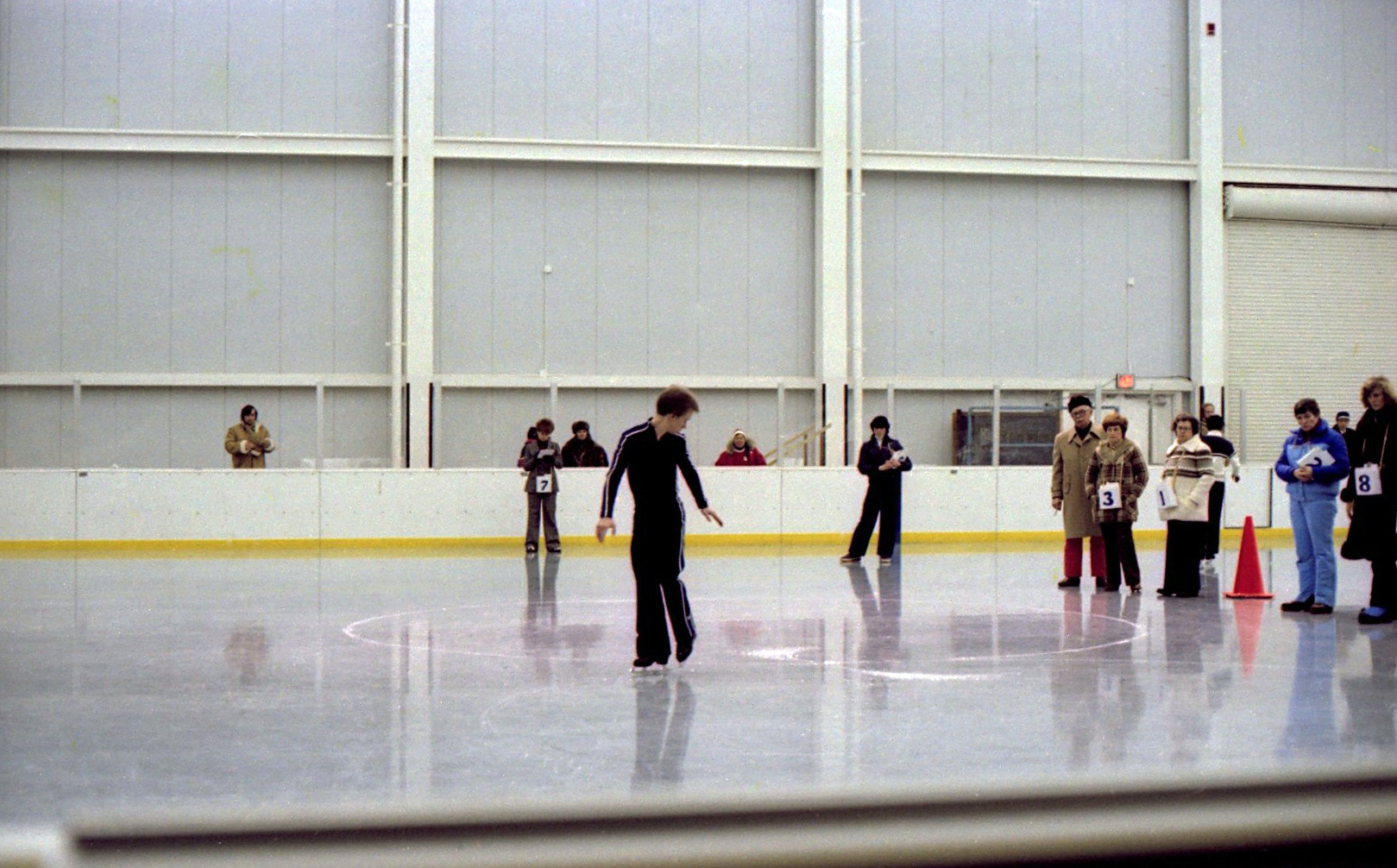
Scott Hamilton competing in compulsory figures at the 1980 Olympics

Loosemore attributed the decrease in the importance of figures to a "lack of public accountability" from the judges of international competitions and other discrepancies in judging, which Loosemore called "dirty judging". She speculated that television coverage of the sport, which brought more attention to how it was judged, was also responsible, and "since figures competitions weren't televised, fans could not be certain that the judges were on the level".

Loosemore also speculated that "the relative scarcity of rinks and practice ice for figures in Europe as compared to North America" ultimately made the difference in the removal of figures from competitions. Author Ellyn Kestnbaum agreed, stating that the elimination of figures was motivated by finances, with countries with an affluent middle class or government-supported training for athletes having more of a competitive advantage over less affluent and smaller countries with fewer ice rinks and resources to spend the time necessary to train for proficiency in figures. In 1991, Kashio Takizawa, then-president of the Japan Skating Federation, noted that Japanese skaters struggled with figures because there were few rinks in the country and skaters rarely had ice clean enough to see their tracings to practice on. By the late 1970s and into the 1980s, there were discussions about eliminating them from international competitions.

In 1988, the ISU voted to remove compulsory figures from international single skating competitions, for both men and women, starting in the 1990–1991 season. Louise Radnofsky of The Wall Street Journal called the decision "a crowd-pleasing change".

Of 31 voting national associations, only the U.S., Canada, Britain, and New Zealand voted against the decision. The last two seasons that compulsory figures were competed at an international competition were in 1989 and 1990; only two figures were skated, and they were worth only 20 percent of the competitors' overall scores. Željka Čižmešija from Yugoslavia skated the last compulsory figure in international competition, at the World Championships in Halifax, Nova Scotia, on 7 March 1990.

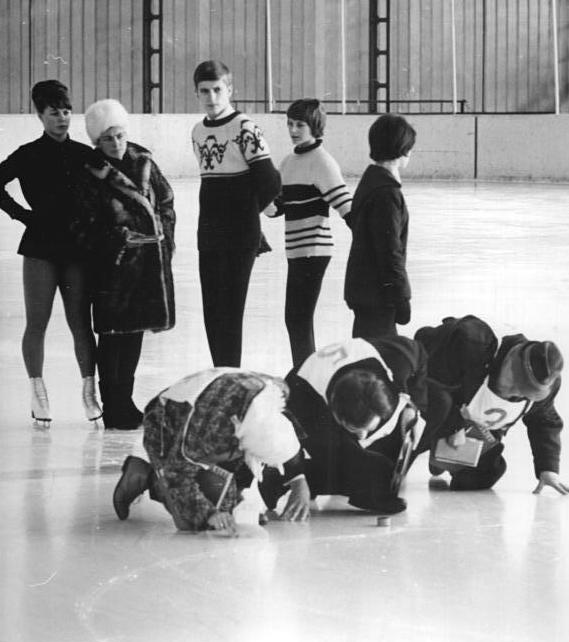
Compulsory figures judging (Berlin, Germany, in 1964)

The U.S. created a separate track for figures instead of immediately eliminating them as most other countries did, and was the last skating federation to include figures at its national championships, at the 1999 U.S. Figure Skating Championships. Its governing council, due to dwindling participation in figures since the ISU ended them in international competitions, finally voted to end them, even at the lower levels of its competitions and for their proficiency tests, in the summer of 1997. Canada also voted to end figures for their proficiency tests in 1997. According to Loosemore, the U.S.' decision to replace the remaining figure proficiency test requirements for competition eligibility in the mid-1990s with moves in the field to test skating proficiency "killed figures as a separate competition discipline". Sports writer Randy Harvey of the Los Angeles Times predicted that the free skate would become the focus in international competitions. Hines, quoting Italian coach Carlo Fassi, predicted in 2006 that the elimination of figures would result in younger girls dominating the sport, a statement Hines called "prophetic".

According to Loosemore, after figures were no longer required, most skaters stopped doing them, resulting in rinks cutting back on the amount of time they offered to skaters who wanted to continue to practice them and a reduction in the number of judges capable of scoring them. Despite the apparent demise of compulsory figures from figure skating, coaches continued to teach figures and skaters continued to practice them because figures gave skaters an advantage in developing alignment, core strength, body control, and discipline. Proponents stated that figures taught basic skating skills, insisting that if skaters did not become proficient in figures, they would not be able to perform well-done free skating programs. American champion and figure skating writer John Misha Petkevich disagrees, stating that the skills needed for proficiency in figures were different than what was needed for free skating, and that the turns and edges learned in figures could be learned in free skating as easily and efficiently.

== Modern revival of figures ==
Louise Radnofsky of the Wall Street Journal, who considered the removal of figures "obvious", also called the movement to revive them "surprising". Brian Boitano, who competed at the 1988 Olympics, the last to include figures, called them "the ultimate competitive exercise" and expressed doubt that they would be televised again, but admitted that if they were, it would be for a niche audience, like for curling. Olympian Debi Thomas, however, stated in 2024 that improvements in technology provided ways to present figures in more accessible ways. In 2015, the first World Figure Championships occurred in Lake Placid, New York, with 14 women and five men competing. They were judged by Olympic medalists and other Olympic skaters, including 1972 Olympic champion Trixi Schuba from Austria, 1972 Olympic bronze medalist Janet Lynn from the U.S., two-time world champion Tim Wood from the U.S., two-time world medalist Julie Lynn Holmes from the U.S., 1962 world champion Donald Jackson from Canada, 1969 Canadian national champion Linda Carbonetto Villella, three-time American pair skating champion JoJo Starbuck, 1963 American champion Tommy Litz, and U.S. Junior national medalist and coach Slavka Kohout Button.

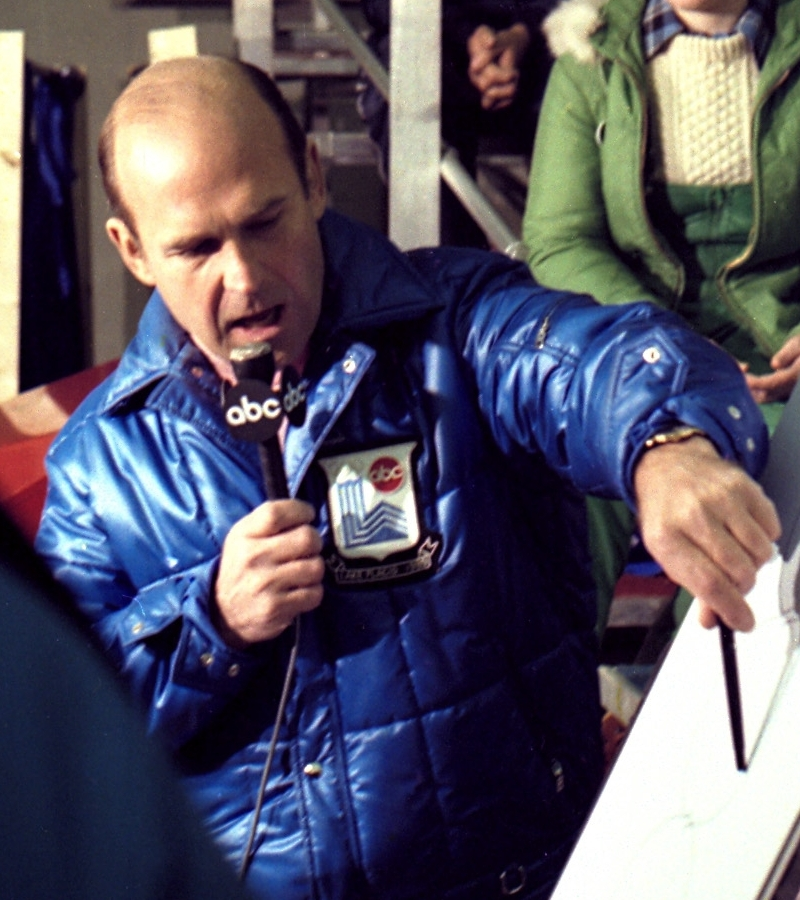
Dick Button (here in 1980), a supporter of the revival of figures

Christie Sausa of the Lake Placid News reported that the 2015 Championships were organized into two rounds, each occurring a day apart. Each round consisted of four complex figures that the skaters had to complete within a time limit ranging from two-and-a-half minutes to four minutes. They were also required to complete six tracings on each foot. Assistant referees were the only ones who observed skaters as they completed their figures and tracings for errors such as falls or foot touch downs. Penalties were recorded before the judging, which was done blind, after the skaters left the ice and without the judges knowing which competitor executed which figure.

The audience was required to remain silent; as Sausa stated, "the repetition of the moves coupled with the peaceful environment made the figures relaxing to watch, yet somehow thrilling at the same time". The competitors skated on black ice, the original color of outdoor ice rinks, before skating moved indoors and surfaces were painted white beneath the ice. According to U.S. Figure Skating, black ice allows spectators and judges to better analyze the figures skaters made.

In the men's competition, Richard Swenning came in first place, American Shepherd Clark came in second place, and Stephen Thompson came in third place. Thompson came from Belgium to watch the championships and decided to compete the day before the event because he was eligible to participate. After a tie for first place in the women's competition, Jill Ahlbrecht and Sandy Lenx-Jackson had to complete an additional tie-breaking figure, and Ahlbrecht won the event.

The 2015 Championships also included workshops teaching skaters how to complete figures. It was endorsed by the Ice Skating Institute. Also in 2015, the World Figure Sport Society (WFSS), the organizing committee for the sport, and WFSS' Skating Hall of Fame was formed; Dick Button attended the Hall of Fame induction ceremony and also commentated for the competition's live stream. In 2016, the Championships were held in Toronto, Ontario, and were held in Vail, Colorado, in 2017, 2018, and 2019. In 2020, the event was postponed due to the COVID-19 pandemic and was held in Plattsburgh, New York in 2021. In 2017, the championships were renamed the World Figure and Fancy Skating Championships (WFFSC), after the book written by George A. Meager, a professional figure skating champion, in 1895.

In 2020, the Lake Placid News reported that figures was the least affected by the COVID-19 pandemic because the WFSS conducted online seminars taught by 1994 Olympian and figures expert, Karen Courtland Kelly, who was the first female Olympian to teach figures and fancy skating, and World Fancy Skating champion Sarah Jo Damron-Brown. Kelly, who founded WFSS and organized its figures championships, has been credited with revitalizing figures. Kelly, who compared revitalizing figures to preserving a language because the "knowledge was literally going extinct", also commentated live-streamed broadcasts of the competitions. The Press-Republican, a local newspaper in Plattsburgh, reported the 2021 competition's unofficial results: Heather Zarisky of the U.S. came in first place in the women's event, and Shepard Clark, also from the U.S., won the men's event. Zarisky's total was 57 points, while Anne Bennett came in second place with 110 points, and Meghan Germain came in third place with 137 points. Clark's total was 50 points; Marc Fenczak came in second place with 96 points, and Matthew Snyder came in third place with 159 points. Zarisky joked later on that figures was "the safest sport in terms of social distancing because we are separated by our quadrants".

By 2020, the event had gotten support from skaters like Dick Button, Janet Lynn, Dorothy Hamill, and Trixi Schuba, and the WFS began hosting workshops for skaters and coaches. At the end of 2020, the Swedish Cross-cut figure was skated for the first time in 100 years at one of WFS' workshops and was confirmed by Paul Wylie, the 1992 U.S. Olympic silver medalist and a director of the Olympic Regional Development Authority. The Lake Placid News also reported that younger skaters were inspired to learn and skate figures, who used them to recover from and prevent injuries, train off-ice during the pandemic, and improve their skating skills. In 2023, the ninth fancy skating championships were held in Lake Placid; skaters from over 20 countries competed. U.S. Olympian Debi Thomas, who said that it was "not like riding a bike at all", competed, marking the first time in 35 years that she had skated figures and 12 years she had done any skating. Clark, who had competed in all nine competitions held and who had won six world championships in fancy skating by 2023, encouraged Thomas to return to skating figures in order to bring more attention to the sport and to prevent its extinction. Thomas finished in second place among eight women competing.

== Works cited ==
- Hines, James R. (2006). Figure Skating: A History. Urbana, Illinois: University of Chicago Press. ISBN 0-252-07286-3.
- Kestnbaum, Ellyn (2003). Culture on Ice: Figure Skating and Cultural Meaning. Middletown, Connecticut: Wesleyan University Press. ISBN 978-0819566416.
- Petkevich, John Misha (1988). Sports Illustrated Figure Skating: Championship Techniques (1st ed.). New York: Sports Illustrated. ISBN 978-1-4616-6440-6. OCLC 815289537.
