= Kennedy Memorial Winter Games =

1970 international multi-sport event

The Kennedy Memorial Winter Games were an international multi-sport competition event held in Lake Placid, New York, from January 9 to March 15, 1970. The Games were held as a tribute to John F. Kennedy and his brother Robert F. Kennedy. President Kennedy had been an advocate of physical fitness and in 1963 urged the development of programs to allow American youth to participate in international sports competitions. The program included competition in figure skating, bobsled, luge, ski jumping, cross-country skiing, and ice hockey.

== Games ==
1. 1970 Kennedy Memorial Winter Games

== Sports ==
The program included competition in figure skating, bobsled, luge, ski jumping, cross-country skiing, and ice hockey.

1. figure skating
2. bobsled
3. luge
4. ski jumping
5. cross-country skiing
6. ice hockey

== Figure skating ==
The figure skating events took place March 13-15, and included competitions in ladies' and men's single skating and pair skating with entrants from 10 countries. This was the first international invitational senior figure skating competition held in the United States, predating the first Skate America competition which was held in 1979.

=== Men's results ===
Rank	Name	Nation	CP	FP	Placings
1	John Baldwin, Sr.	United States	1	1	7
2	Gordon McKellen	United States	3	3	20
3	Stefano Bargauan	Italy	2	4	32
4	Ron Shaver	Canada	10	2	31
5	Reinhard Ketterer	West Germany	4	6	40
6	Jacques Mrozek	France	7	7	41
7	Josef Schneider	Austria	5	9	48
8	Jozef Žídek	Czechoslovakia	6	5	45
9	John Curry	United Kingdom	8	8	54
10	Paul Bonenfant	Canada	9	10	69
11	Yutaka Higuchi	Japan	11	11	75

=== Ladies' results ===
Rank	Name	Nation	CP	FP	Placings
1	Joanne Darakjy	United States	4	2	15
2	Mary McCaffrey	Canada	1	3	16
3	Jennie Walsh	United States	6	1	17
4	Kazumi Yamashita	Japan	2	4	25
5	Jean Scott	United Kingdom	5	5	34
6	Karen Grobba	Canada	7	6	45
7	Ľudmila Bezáková	Czechoslovakia	8	7	48
8	Cinzia Frosio	Italy	9	8	52
9	Marion von Cetto	West Germany	10	9	63
WDR	Charlotte Walter	Switzerland	3		

=== Pairs results ===
Rank	Name	Nation	SP	FP	Placings
1	Brunhilde Bassler / Eberhard Rausch	West Germany	1	1	7
2	Dana Fialova / Josef Tuma	Czechoslovakia	2	3	19
3	Evelyne Scharf / Wilhelm Bietak	Austria	3	2	24
4	Barbara Brown / Doug Berndt	United States	5	4	24
5	Mona Szabo / Pierre Szabo	France	4	5	32
6	Kathy Normile / Gregory Taylor	United States	6	7	46
7	Karin Künzle / Christian Künzle	Switzerland	7	6	45
8	Marion Murray / Glenn Moore	Canada	8	8	55
WDR	Kotoe Nagasawa / Hiroshi Nagakubo	Japan	9		
