= Toller Cranston =

Canadian figure skater and painter

Toller Cranston CM
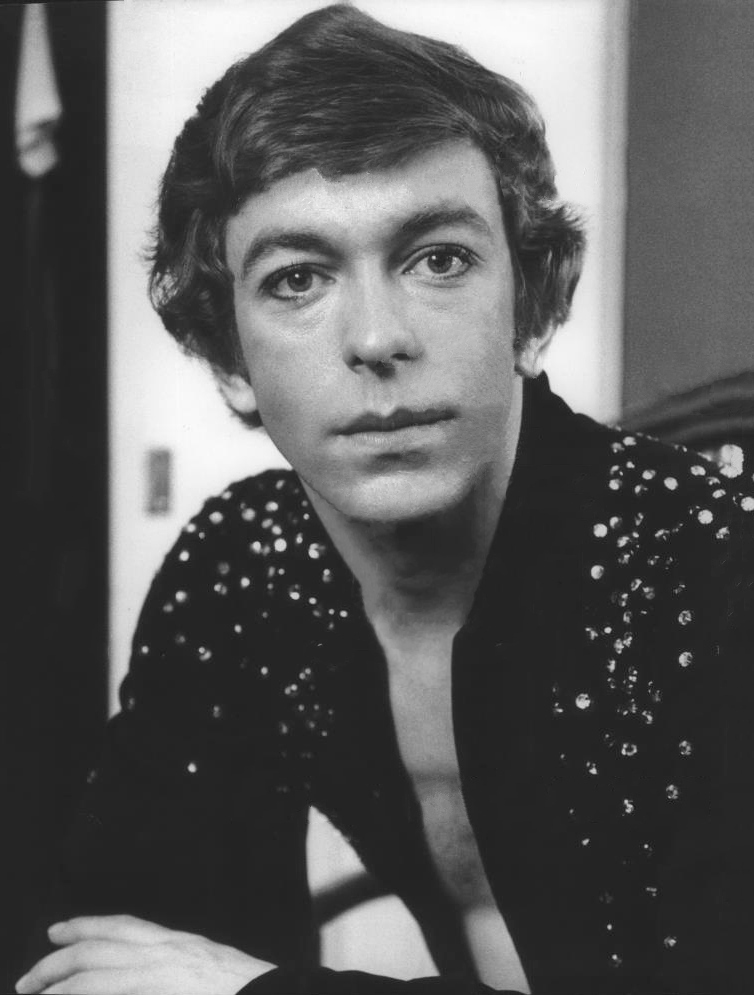
- Cranston in 1977

Personal information
- Full name: Toller Shalitoe Montague Cranston
- Born: April 20, 1949 Hamilton, Ontario, Canada
- Died: January 24, 2015 (aged 65) San Miguel de Allende, Mexico
- Home town: Kirkland Lake, Ontario, Canada
- Height: 172 cm (5 ft 8 in)

Figure skating career
- Country: Canada
- Skating club: TCS & CC
Medal record
Representing Canada
Figure skating
Olympic Games
Bronze medal – third place	1976 Innsbruck	Singles
World Championships
Bronze medal – third place	1974 Munich	Singles
North American Championships
Silver medal – second place	1971 Peterborough	Singles

Toller Shalitoe Montague Cranston CM (April 20, 1949 – January 24, 2015) was a Canadian figure skater and painter. He won the 1971–1976 Canadian national championships, the 1974 World bronze medal and the 1976 Olympic bronze medal. Despite never winning at the World Figure Skating Championships due to his poor compulsory figures, he won the small medal for free skating at the 1972 and 1974 championships. Cranston is credited by many with having brought a new level of artistry to men's figure skating.

== Personal life ==
Cranston was born in Hamilton, Ontario, in 1949 and grew up in Kirkland Lake. When he was 11, his family moved to suburban Montreal. Growing up, Cranston had an uneasy relationship with his family, especially his mother, who was a painter and who he said had a domineering and self-centred personality. He later compared his childhood to "being in jail"; in school he had the habit of asking provocative questions that made his teachers think he was being disruptive. After high school, Cranston attended the École des beaux-arts de Montréal. By his third year, he became restless with his studies. One of his teachers suggested that there was nothing more he could learn at the school, so Cranston set out at that point to establish himself as a professional artist.

In 1976, he teamed up with personal manager Elva Oglanby to write his first book, Toller, a mixture of autobiography, sketches, poems, paintings, humour and tongue-in-cheek observations. It reached number two in the Canadian non-fiction charts. Cranston co-wrote the autobiographical Zero Tollerance (1997) with Martha Lowder Kimball, and a second volume, When Hell Freezes Over: Should I Bring My Skates? (2000), also with Kimball. Though he described a sexual tryst between himself and Ondrej Nepela in the second book as well as affairs with women, in his books he presents himself as having lived without forming strong romantic or emotional attachments.

== Artistic career ==
After leaving the Ecole des Beaux Arts, Cranston became self-supporting as an artist, making enough money to cover his skating expenses. He held his first exhibition at his coach Ellen Burka's home in the spring of 1969. In November 1971, he had another successful one-man show in Toronto, the result of almost a year's work. Thereafter, he continued to have gallery and museum displays, with over 250 exhibitions around the world.

== Skating career ==
=== Amateur career ===
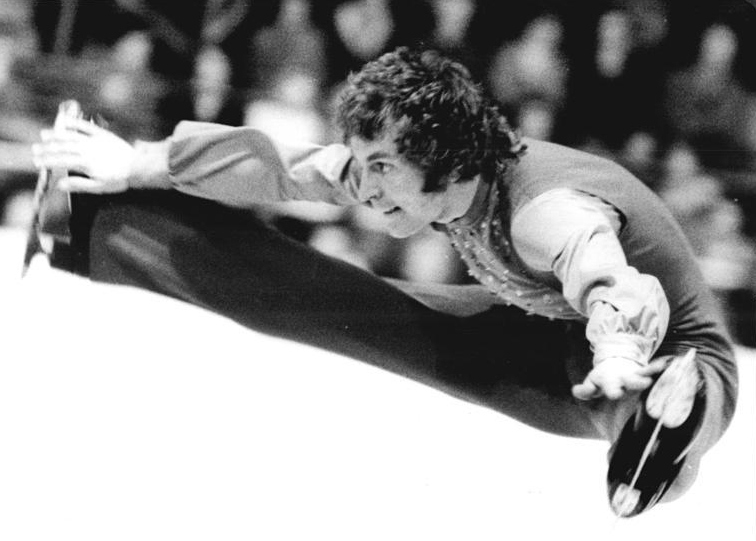
Cranston performs a split jump at the 1974 World Figure Skating Championships

After an initial failed experience with ballet lessons, Cranston started skating at the age of 7, when his parents bought him hockey skates. He experimented on his own with trying to dance on the ice, and was only later told that what he was doing was called "figure skating". His mother was reluctant to allow him to pursue the sport seriously, but at the age of 11, he met Eva Vasak, who was impressed by his talent and offered to coach him for free. Vasak coached him for the next eight years.

When Cranston was 13, he developed Osgood–Schlatter disease and was initially told that he would never skate again. After eight weeks in a cast, he resumed training, and won the 1964 Canadian Junior Championship the next month. In the next few years, however, Cranston met with little success at the senior level. As he was dividing his attention with art school at this time, his physical conditioning was poor and he struggled to make it through his programs, which at that time were 5 minutes for senior men.

After failing to make the Canadian team for the 1968 Winter Olympics, Cranston struggled with motivation and lack of training discipline. His career turned a corner in the following season when he began to work with coach Ellen Burka in Toronto. Burka required him to do complete run-throughs of his entire program and his results began to improve: third at the Canadian championships in 1969, and second in 1970.

Cranston often came in first in his free skating programs, but his low placements in compulsory figures limited his overall scores and placements. As figure skating historian James R. Hines put it, Cranston was weak in compulsory figures, but his strength was the free skate. He was a clockwise spinner and jumper. He quickly gained a reputation as the most innovative and exciting artistic skater of his time, one of the first to emphasize use of the whole body to express the music as well as to execute skating moves in best form, to lie down while sliding down the ice and to wear elaborate costumes. He was particularly known for the quality and inventiveness of his spins, which were widely copied by other skaters. The quality of his precision landings and inventive choreography was topped by his combination jumps that included triple revolution jumps. Soon reports from competitions of this period began to mention younger skaters who had become "Tollerized" by attempting to copy Cranston's style, which was characterized by contrasting very stretched positions with a high free leg with more angular, bent-leg positions, and the incorporation of elements such as running toe steps and high kicks in step sequences. Many of his original spins included many changes of positions that seemed to defy gravity. His Russian split jump was "over split" which brought his skates up to shoulder height instead of waist height.

As figure skating writer and historian Ellyn Kestnbaum put it, Cranston brought his artist's eye to the sport, as well as "a flexible body" and elaborate costumes and gestures. He made popular moves held in "unexpected angles", including sideways toepick runs, the broken-leg sit spin, stag jumps, and his own variation on the back camel spin. He used choreography to create, with his arms and other body parts, specific shapes that demonstrated artistry. He also used his natural flexibility to "craft unusual extreme body shapes employing both curved and angular lines". Kestnbaum states that Cranston's movements were counter to the classical movements of traditional figure skating movements and the movements of many of his contemporaries, including John Curry from Great Britain. Cranston's movements inspired male skaters of the time into the 1980s, especially in North America and the Soviet Union, even if they were not done with his flexibility and gracefulness. Hines stated that Cranston was "perhaps the most avant garde skater in the history of the sport, one who judges did not always understand or appreciate". Hines added that as a result, Cranston was not remembered for his competitive record "but rather for what he brought to the sport".

Even during his competitive career, Cranston had talked about his goal in skating being to create what he called "theatre on ice", or skating as a form of dance expression, rather than winning medals. He explained that the purpose of perfecting the technical aspects of the sport was to allow the body to express the music or emotion. Cranston called himself "the last true amateur", a reference to the state sponsorship that many of his European competitors enjoyed and the corporate sponsorship of skaters such as John Curry. As Hines put it, Cranston was "never a conventional skater but rather a bold modernist who employed angular body movements in a dramatic and highly interpretative style".

Cranston won his first national title in 1971 with a performance that included triple Salchow and loop jumps, and received a standing ovation from the audience. He also won the silver medal at the 1971 North American Championships, the last time the event was held. It was in the 1972 season that he truly established his reputation in the sport. At the 1972 Canadian championships, his marks included four 6.0s for artistic impression and six 5.9s for technical merit. At this time the artistic impression mark was supposed to be based on the quality of the jumps, landings and spins, and the choreography to the music. Cranston skated poor compulsory figures at the 1972 Winter Olympics, but turned in a strong program to finish fifth place in the free skating. At the 1972 World Figure Skating Championships, he won the free skating medal with another superb performance, again landing triple loop and Salchow jumps and receiving a thunderous standing ovation as well as a perfect 6.0 mark for artistic impression. He won the bronze medal at the 1974 World Figure Skating Championships, coming in first place in both the short program and in the free skate, but coming in eighth place in figures. Toller Cranston was the 1976 Olympic bronze medalist, coming in first place in the short program, second place in the free skate, and seventh place in compulsory figures.

=== Professional career ===
After the 1976 competitive season, Cranston began a long career in professional figure skating. Following up on his earlier-stated goal of developing "theatre on ice", Cranston performed and starred in the Broadway show, "The Ice Show", at New York's Palace Theatre. The show ran for six weeks and was extended for another four weeks. It also featured Gordon McKellen, Colleen O'Connor and James Millns, and several other former elite champion skaters including (during its run) Ken Shelly and Jo Jo Starbuck. The ice show was broadcast as a special on ABC's Wide World of Sports recorded in the arena in Montreal, Canada. He later toured in Europe with Holiday on Ice, and in 1983 appeared in a short-lived production at Radio City Music Hall in New York City with Peggy Fleming and Robin Cousins.

In the late 1970s and early 1980s, Cranston made a series of skating specials for CBC television. The best of these was "Strawberry Ice" (1982), a fantasy that also featured Peggy Fleming, Sandra and Val Bezic, Allen Schramm, and Sarah Kawahara, with imaginative costumes designed by Frances Dafoe. The production won a variety of awards, including an ACTRA Award and was redistributed in 67 countries. Cranston's other TV specials included "Dream Weaver" (1979) and "Magic Planet" (1983).

During this period, Cranston was a regular on the Canadian variety TV show Stars on Ice, and appeared in the similar NBC series The Big Show in 1980.

His other television credits included a cameo appearance in an ice ballet production of "The Snow Queen" (1982), starring John Curry and Janet Lynn. In 1983, he portrayed the character of Tybalt in "Romeo and Juliet on Ice", a production starring Brian Pockar and Dorothy Hamill as the title characters. He appeared in Joni Mitchell's concert film "Shadows and Light". He made a non-skating acting appearance in the 1983 short film "I Am a Hotel", a music video featuring songs by Leonard Cohen. He is also on the back cover of Joni Mitchell's album "Hejira".

Throughout the 1980s, he was a regular competitor at the World Professional Figure Skating Championships and other made-for-TV pro skating events. In 1986, he was one of the cast members of the original IMG-produced American Stars on Ice tour (no relation to the earlier Canadian TV series of the same name), and appeared with the show for the next several years.

Cranston was also a commentator on CBC television for figure skating events. However, in 1991, the CBC fired him, citing concerns from the Canadian Figure Skating Association that his often brutally frank and opinionated commentary was denigrating to Canadian skaters. Cranston filed a lawsuit against the CBC that was eventually resolved in his favour.

In the summer of 1990, Cranston agreed to coach American skater Christopher Bowman, who moved into Cranston's home in Toronto. The influence of the notoriously unstable Bowman on Cranston's life was disastrous; Cranston later wrote, "... drug dealers buzzed the front doorbell morning, noon, and night. Prostitutes invaded my house from the street. Christopher sometimes announced that he was going out for a carton of milk and didn't return for three days." Having lost the ability to tolerate Bowman's behaviour any longer Cranston finally threw him out in the fall of 1991. Meanwhile, Cranston had become so depressed that he was unable to paint, and started taking drugs as well. At this time, he began to make changes in his lifestyle: He sold his Toronto house, which was cluttered with art he had collected over the years, and bought a house in San Miguel de Allende, Mexico.

Cranston continued to perform in Canada with Stars on Ice and IMG's smaller-city tour, Skate the Nation, for the next few years. However, in the fall of 1994, he broke his leg while practicing for a holiday show in Vail, Colorado. Although he made a few skating appearances afterwards, in 1997, he decided to retire from professional skating before (as he described it) he became a parody of himself.

=== Results ===
International
Event	1962–63	1963–64	1967–68	1968–69	1969–70	1970–71	1971–72	1972–73	1973–74	1974–75	1975–76
Winter Olympics							9th				3rd
World Championships					13th	11th	5th	5th	3rd	4th	4th
North American Championships				6th		2nd					
Skate Canada International									1st		1st
St. Gervais					3rd						
National
Canadian Championships	3rd J.	1st J.	4th	3rd	2nd	1st	1st	1st	1st	1st	1st
J. = Junior level

=== Retirement ===
For retirement, Cranston took residence in San Miguel de Allende, Mexico, a UNESCO World Heritage Site, where his large and opulently decorated home and studio, as well as his painting became his main artistic forms of expression. Cranston's work often incorporated themes related to skating.

In 2010, Cranston returned to skating for a short time as a guest judge for Battle of the Blades, a figure skating reality competition show on CBC Television. In 2013, he was appointed as the Official Artist of Skate Canada and produced the signature poster for the 2013 ISU World Figure Skating Championships in London, Ontario.

=== Death ===
Cranston was found dead at his residence from an apparent heart attack on the morning of January 24, 2015, aged 65. Skate Canada paid tribute to him with a moment of silence at the Canadian Figure Skating Championships in Kingston, Ontario.

Cranston died with an outdated will, leaving his three siblings to fight over Cranston's estate. His sister, Phillippa Baran, was subsequently sued by her two surviving brothers, Goldie and Guy Cranston for, among other things, fraud. In 2021, the matter was settled, with the court finding that there had been no impropriety on Baran's part.

=== Legacy ===
Cranston was inducted into the Canadian Olympic Hall of Fame in 1976, the Ontario Sports Hall of Fame in 1996, the Canadian Figure Skating Hall of Fame in 1997, Canada's Sports Hall of Fame in 1997, and Canada's Walk of Fame in 2003. He was made a Member of the Order of Canada in 1977, and received a Special Olympic Order from the Canadian Olympic Association in 1995. He was inducted into the World Figure Skating Hall of Fame in 2004.

== Works cited ==
- Kestnbaum, Ellyn (2003). Culture on Ice: Figure Skating and Cultural Meaning. Middletown, Connecticut: Wesleyan University Press. ISBN 0819566411.
