= Kotoe =

- Gender: Female

Origin
- Origin: Japanese
- Meaning: Different meanings depending on the kanji used

Kotoe (written: 琴絵 or 琴枝) is a feminine Japanese given name. Notable people with the name include:

- Kotoe Inoue (井上 琴絵; born 1990), Japanese volleyball player
- Kotoe Nagasawa (長沢 琴枝; born 1950), Japanese figure skater and coach
