= Shepherd Clark =

American figure skater

Personal information
- Full name: Shepherd Walton Clark
- Born: March 1, 1971 (age 55) Atlanta, Georgia, U.S.
- Height: 5 ft 10 in (1.78 m)

Figure skating career
- Country: United States
- Discipline: Men's singles
- Coach: Slavka Button, Diane Agle
- Skating club: SC of Boston
- Began skating: 1974
Medal record
World Junior Championships
Silver medal – second place	1989 Sarajevo	Men's singles

Shepherd Walton Clark (born March 1, 1971) is an American competitive figure skater and is the reigning World Figure & Fancy Skating Champion as of April 2025, having won the last 9 consecutive world championships.

== WFS World Figure Skating Records ==
In October 2025, World Figure Sport (WFS) held The 11th World Figure & Fancy Skating Championships on black ice in Lake Placid, New York. Clark defended his title in The 1932 Olympic Arena and became the first in history to win nine consecutive World Figure & Fancy Skating Championships. In 2024, He won the event with all first place ordinals from all of the judges on all of the segments of the competition, which is the first time in World Figure Sport history for men or ladies.

In 2024, Mr. Clark also won the Creative Figure portion of the event for a second time in a row, which is a segment of the event in which the ladies and the men compete with each other, yet the totals are separated when they're calculated in either the men's or the ladies event. Shepherd Clark is undefeated in The Creative Figure event, having won the event in both 2023 and in 2024. Shepherd Clark with nine golds and two silvers, and Jill Albrecht, with three golds and one bronze, are the two most decorated figure skaters in the Men and Ladies events, in World Figure Sport history.

Clark has a total of fifteen World Figure Sport World Championships medals, nine gold (2017 - 2024) and two silver medals (2015 and 2016) overall, and two additional World Fancy Skating golds won in 2017 and 2018, and two 2023 / 2024 Special Figure Gold making him the most decorated skater in World Figure Sport’s history. He is also the only skater to compete in all eleven World Figure & Fancy Skating Championships, 2015–2025. Clark is the only man to defend a World Figure title, and to achieve the dual Figure & Fancy title, and the first to defend the dual titles in World Figure Sport’s history.

In Fancy Skating, edge quality, positions, artistry, musicality, and originality (which includes flying and spinning), are valued highly in comparison to the numbers of rotations of skating jumps in other systems. Clark's dual title of "World Figure & Fancy Skating Champion", comes from George A. Meagher's 1895 publication, "Figures and Fancy Skating".

Clark had gone from his early years struggling with his figures, to being recognized many years later as "The King of Figures" (2023 Lake Placid Legacy Sites Article Image Shepherd Clark "The King of Figures With Dorothy Hamill) and as a World Champion Skating Artist. In 2021, Clark scored perfect World Class 6 marks from all of the judges on his Left Forward Inside Eight Figure, making him the first skater, man or woman, to achieve a perfect score on a figure. In 2021, he also won all 16 of the segments of the competition, a unique feat that no man, or woman, had achieved in World Figure Sport’s history. In 2024, Clark repeated winning all segments of the 2024 World Figure & Fancy Skating Championships and is the most decorated champion in World Figure Sport’s Skating Hall of Fame. In 2019, Clark earned the highest score in World Figure Sport history, the highest, "World Class 6", essentially a perfect mark in World Figure Sport.

In August 2015, Richard Swenning won the gold and Clark won the silver medal in men's figures at the inaugural World Figure Championship (and now the World Figure & Fancy Skating Championships) in Lake Placid, New York. In December 2016, Canadian Gary Beacom won the gold and Clark won the silver medal in men's figures at the World Figure Championship (and now the World Figure & Fancy Skating Championships on black ice) in Toronto, Ontario.

Clark proceeded to win the gold medal in 2017, 2018, 2019, 2020, 2021, 2022, 2023, 2024, and 2025. In 2017, the gold medal was presented to him by Dorothy Hamill, the 1976 US National, Olympic, and World Champion. In 2017, Clark was presented the World Figure & Fancy Skating Championships’ Trophy by Lorna Brown in memory of John Curry, 1976 Olympic Champion. The iconic trophy was original designed in Jaca, Spain and was formerly presented to the World Professional Skating Champion, Lorna Brown, whose professional skating partner was John Curry. Clark was coached by Carlo and Christa Fassi, as were Dorothy Hamill and John Curry. Clark is also the 2017 World Fancy Skating Champion, which is a blend of figure composition and artistic free skating. His gold medal was presented by Barbara Wagner, the 1960 Olympic Pairs Figure Skating Champion. In 2019, Shepherd Clark's gold medal was presented by Donald Jackson, of Canada, a World Champion and the first skater to land the Triple Lutz jump.

In 2020, Clark was awarded World Figure Sport’s Maribel Vinson Lifetime Achievement Award, for his accomplishments in figure skating, including having performed and competed the greatest number and types of figures in world competition than anyone in skating's history.

His figure scores set a record for the highest ever in 2019, achieving seven "World Class 6" scores at the 2019 Championships in Vail. is record scoring final figure of the 2019 World Figure Championships, "Eight Eights", is on the cover of the World Figure Sport’s Skating Exam Catalog published in 2020, along with an image of the 2019 World Figure Championship’s Men's event podium. Also in 2020, World Figure Sport inaugurated the Suzanne Shelley Clark Memorial Trophy, in memory of Clark's recently deceased mother, who is known to have supported her son over a lifetime. This award is presented occasionally to extraordinary people in the world of figure skating art.

In 2023, Clark became the first winner of the “Fine Art of Skating” Competition at World Figure & Fancy Skating Championships’ Creative Fancy Figure event, where the men and ladies’ were evaluated together (by a sequestered judging panel) and solely upon their “Fine Art of Skating’s Creative Fancy Figure” that was etched into the black ice. Debi Thomas of the United States placed second, famed for "The Battle of The Carmens" and for winning the final two figures competed at The Olympics Games, which was in 1988, at The Calgary Olympics. In 2023 Clark and Thomas trained together, promoting the World Figure Sport Society and the World Figure & Fancy Skating Championships via the media.

== ISU Figure Skating Titles ==
In the International Skating Union (ISU) figure skating events, Clark won the 1989 World Junior silver medal, the 1989 Nebelhorn Trophy champion, the 1994 Nations Cup silver medalist, and the 1996 Finlandia Trophy champion. He was the first skater to land the triple lutz / triple loop combination in competition. As well as being a successful figure skater, he is also a jeweled art designer and jewel historian.

Shepherd Clark and Debi Thomas are the only two skaters in the world to have achieved a medals in both an International Skating Union (ISU) World Championships’ level event, and a World Figure Sport (WFS) World Figure & Fancy Skating Championships’ level event. Clark won medals at these two events: as the 1989 World Junior Championships silver medalist, and at the 2015-2023 World Figure and Fancy Skating Championships, where Clark won two silvers and nine gold medals, for a total of a record eleven medals. In September 2024, Mr. Clark's autograph realized $1,525 at auction.

Clark was coached by, and worked with, many of the world's most famous figure skating coaches, such as Carlo Fassi, Don Laws, Frank Carroll, Trixi Schuba, Tim Wood, Gary Visconti, Lynn Gagliotti, Mary Scotvold, Slavka Button and Diane Agle in Boston, Massachusetts. In December 1987, at the age of sixteen, he placed 4th at the ISU 1988 World Junior Figure Skating Championships, and he won the silver medal at the 1989 Junior Worlds the following year. He won silver at the 1994 Nations Cup, placing second to Elvis Stojko, who was the reigning ISU World Figure Skating Champion.

He was the 1998 US Olympic Team Alternate (reserve skater). In 1999, Clark placed 6th at the first Four Continents Championships in Halifax, Nova Scotia.

== Personal life ==
Clark is an artist of jewel design and of jeweled art objects, and also a jewel historian. He is an entrepreneur in various industries, and known for working with charities and ministries. He is also known to be a cat lover; he has used cats in his promotional media. In 2025, article in Skating Magazine citing Shepherd Clark's achievements as "Monumental". Nicole Bobek's 2025 biography BOBEK "The Wild One" references Shepherd Clark as a childhood friend of Bobek, stating "as if he (Shepherd) stepped out of a classical painting and into the spotlight". In 2026 Mr. Clark published "Shepherd, The Jeweled Journey, The Other Miracle On Ice" as an art exhibition book, presenting a testimony about his faith and living in the miraculous.

== Programs ==
Season	Short program	Free skating
1998–99		Death and Transfiguration; Rosenkavalier by Richard Strauss

== Competitive highlights ==
GP: Champions Series / Grand Prix

WFS Events	2015	2016	2017	2018	2019	2020	2021	2022	2023	2024					
World Figure Championship	2nd	2nd	1st	1st											
World Fancy Skating Championship			1st	1st											
World Figure & Fancy Skating Championships					1st	1st	1st	1st	1st	1st					
Fine Art of Skating - Creative Fancy Figure Competition									1st	1st					
International
ISU Events	87–88	88–89	89–90	90–91	91–92	92–93	93–94	94–95	95–96	96–97	97–98	98–99	99–00	01–02	02-03
Four Continents												6th			
GP NHK Trophy									6th						
GP Skate America												9th			
GP Sparkassen												11th			
Finlandia Trophy										1st					
Nations Cup								2nd							
Nebelhorn Trophy			1st					2nd					10th		
Piruetten				2nd						WD					
Schäfer Memorial					2nd										
St. Gervais			2nd												
International: Junior
Junior Worlds	4th	2nd													
National
U.S. Champ.	4th J	1st J	7th	7th	9th	5th	6th		6th	10th	4th	5th	WD	11th	WD (17)
