= Judy Sladky =

American actress and former competitive ice dancer

Judy Schwomeyer
Personal information
- Full name: Judith Kay Schwomeyer
- Other names: Judy Sladky
- Born: November 14, 1950 (age 75) Indianapolis, Indiana

Figure skating career
- Country: United States
- Partner: James Sladky
- Skating club: WC of Indianapolis
Medal record
Figure skating: Ice dancing
Representing the United States
World Championships
Bronze medal – third place	1972 Calgary	Ice dancing
Bronze medal – third place	1971 Lyon	Ice dancing
Silver medal – second place	1970 Ljubljana	Ice dancing
Bronze medal – third place	1969 Colorado Springs	Ice dancing
North American Championships
Gold medal – first place	1971 Peterborough	Ice dancing
Silver medal – second place	1969 Oakland	Ice dancing
Bronze medal – third place	1967 Montreal	Ice dancing

Judith Kay Schwomeyer (married name Sladky; born November 14, 1950) is an American actress and former competitive ice dancer. With her skating partner and then-husband, Jim Sladky, she became a four-time World medalist (silver in 1970; bronze in 1969, 1971, 1972) and five-time U.S. national champion (1968–1972).

== Personal life ==
Judith Kay Schwomeyer was born on November 14, 1950. She graduated from Shortridge High School in Indianapolis. She is the daughter of Herb Schwomeyer, a Butler University coach and administrator, and sister of Sandy Lamb, an ice dancing coach.

She was married to Jim Sladky from 1971 to 1990. She later married Blake Norton.

== Career ==
=== Skating ===
Schwomeyer/Sladky won five national titles, from 1968 to 1972. They finished on the podium at four World Championships, winning silver in 1970 and bronze in 1969, 1971, and 1972).

They were coached by Ron Ludington. Together with Ludington, Schwomeyer/Sladky created the Yankee Polka compulsory dance. They first performed it as a competitive program in 1969. Following their retirement from competitive skating, the duo skated professionally.

They were inducted into the United States Figure Skating Hall of Fame in 1991.

=== Acting ===
Schwomeyer has worked as an actress. She is the Muppeteer of Alice Snuffleupagus in Sesame Street and portrayed Snoopy in Jingle All the Way.

== Competition results ==
International
Event	1966	1967	1968	1969	1970	1971	1972
World Championships		8th	4th	3rd	2nd	3rd	3rd
North American Champ.		3rd		2nd		1st	
National
U.S. Championships	6th	3rd	1st	1st	1st	1st	1st
