= Julie Lynn Holmes =

American figure skater

Personal information
- Born: March 23, 1951 (age 75) North Hollywood, California, U.S.
- Height: 5 ft 4 in (1.63 m)

Figure skating career
- Country: United States
- Retired: 1972
Medal record
Ladies' figure skating
Representing the United States
World Championships
Silver medal – second place	1971 Lyon	Ladies' singles
Bronze medal – third place	1970 Ljubljana	Ladies' singles

Julie Lynn Holmes (born March 23, 1951, in North Hollywood, California) is an American former figure skater. She won one silver medal and one bronze medal at the World Figure Skating Championships and competed in the 1972 Winter Olympics.

She was coached initially by Nancy Rush and then by Carlo Fassi. She skated generally in the shadows of fellow American Janet Lynn, although Holmes had considerably better luck on the world stage than at her own country's championships. She was known for her skill at performing compulsory figures. She generally was beaten by both Karen Magnussen and Janet Lynn in free skating portions, but placed over both in compulsory figure portions, which sometimes allowed her to defeat them. She generally beat Trixi Schuba handily in free skating portions but was behind in compulsory figure portions, and always too far behind to be able to defeat Trixi despite her weaker free skating. Gabriele Seyfert regularly placed above her in both compulsory figure and free skating portions while still competing up until 1970. Despite never defeating Lynn at the U.S. Championships, and thus never winning a U.S. National title, she beat her and Karen Magnussen to win bronze at the 1970 World Championships and silver in 1971. At the 1972 Winter Olympics, she was well positioned to win silver due to a strong lead (apart from Schuba who she trailed by a near insurmountable margin) after figures, but a rare disastrous long program where she placed only 8th and fell a couple times dropped her to 4th behind Trixi Schuba, Karen Magnussen, and Janet Lynn, off the podium.

She was criticized by some for copying too closely the exact style of Peggy Fleming, perhaps in part due to being coached by the same person- Carlo Fassi.

Holmes retired from competitive skating after the Olympics and toured with Ice Capades. She also skated on the Donny & Marie television series. She currently works as a part-time skating coach.

== Results ==
Event	1965	1966	1967	1968	1969	1970	1971	1972
Winter Olympic Games								4th
World Championships					4th	3rd	2nd	
U.S. Championships	1st N.	5th J	1st J	6th	2nd	2nd	2nd	2nd
