= Karen Magnussen =

Canadian figure skater

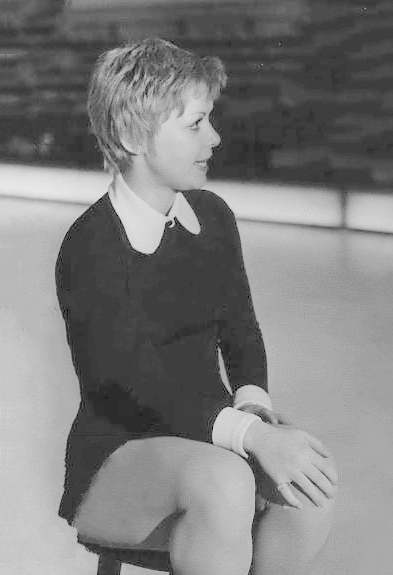
- Magnussen in 1974

Personal information
- Full name: Karen Diane Magnussen-Cella
- Born: April 4, 1952 (age 74) Vancouver, British Columbia, Canada
- Height: 160 cm (5 ft 3 in)

Figure skating career
- Country: Canada
- Skating club: North Shore Winter Club
- Retired: 1977
Medal record
Representing Canada
Figure skating: Ladies' singles
Winter Olympics
Silver medal – second place	1972 Sapporo	Singles
World Championships
Gold medal – first place	1973 Bratislava	Singles
Silver medal – second place	1972 Calgary	Singles
Bronze medal – third place	1971 Lyon	Singles
North American Championships
Gold medal – first place	1971 Peterborough	Singles
Silver medal – second place	1969 Oakland	Singles

Karen Diane Magnussen, OC (born April 4, 1952) is a Canadian former competitive figure skater. She is the 1972 Olympic silver medallist and 1973 World champion. She was Canada's Female Athlete of the Year in 1971 and 1972, and was made an Officer of the Order of Canada in 1973.

== Personal life ==
Karen Magnussen was born on April 4, 1952, in Vancouver, British Columbia. She grew up in a middle-class family to a Swedish mother and a Norwegian father. She has two sisters, Lori, three years younger, and Judy, six years younger.

Magnussen studied kinesiology at Simon Fraser University. In 1978, she married Tony Cella, the lead singer of a band. They lived in his hometown, Boston, for eleven years and then moved to Vancouver. They have two sons and a daughter.

== Competitive career ==
After being introduced to the ice at age six and a half when her mother, a recreational skater, brought her to a general skating session, Magnussen then kept asking for more opportunities to skate. Recalling lessons on pebbly curling ice at the Kerrisdale Arena, she commented, "The ice was anything but perfect, but I think that made you tough." Her first coach was Hellmut May. Linda Brauckmann became her coach in 1965.

Magnussen's career at the elite level of skating began when she won the Canadian national junior title in 1965. Moving up to the senior level the next year, she became known for her strong free skating ability, and was even compared to then-reigning world champion Petra Burka. Her march upwards in the rankings continued as she qualified to compete at the World Championships for the first time in 1967 and won her first Canadian title in 1968. She was sent to the 1968 Winter Olympics in Grenoble, France, and placed seventh.

In 1969, Magnussen lost her Canadian title to Linda Carbonetto. She was diagnosed with stress fractures in both legs in February 1969, spent three months in a wheelchair, and returned to the ice in mid-May. Magnussen was granted free early morning ice time at Vancouver's Pacific Coliseum before the hockey players arrived. Though she watched the 1969 World Championships from a wheelchair, she said, "I was planning for next year's competition. I never considered giving up; I always knew that I'd be back." She won the Canadian Championships four more times, from 1970 to 1973. At the World Championships, she won a bronze medal in 1971 and then silver in 1972.

Like her American contemporary Janet Lynn, Magnussen was stronger in free skating than compulsory figures. In the early 1970s, both were competing against the Austrian skater Trixi Schuba, who excelled at figures and often built a huge early lead under a scoring system which heavily valued those skills. Schuba's strength in figures allowed her to win the gold at the 1972 Winter Olympics despite placing seventh in the free skating segment, while Lynn and Magnussen (first and second in the free skating) took bronze and silver, respectively. Since most audiences found compulsory figures unexciting, the International Skating Union reduced their value and introduced the short program in the 1972–73 season. Combined with Schuba's retirement after the Olympic season, this development encouraged both Magnussen and Lynn to stay in competition another year.

At the 1973 World Figure Skating Championships, the first under the new judging system, Magnussen produced a strong short program that included a double Axel. Meanwhile, Lynn fell twice in that portion of the competition. Although Lynn came back to win the free skating segment, her problems in the short cost her the title. The CTV Television Network, the Canadian broadcaster covering the championships, was concerned that Magnussen's free skate would be completed before the network went live at 3:30 p.m. Eastern Time, because the event was running several minutes early. The championship's official's refused CTV's request to delay the competition until 3:30 p.m. So, the Canadians convinced the Zamboni driver to take an unusually long 17-minute shift to resurface the ice. In the final year in which solid gold medals were awarded in figure skating, Magnussen added a gold to complete her World medal collection.

== Later life ==
Magnussen retired from competition and turned professional, saying in October 1973, "I'm glad my folks don't have to worry now about paying my bills. They gave up so much for my lessons, and they never said one thing about it, for which I love them so much. I can help them out now, and help my two younger sisters." She performed with Ice Capades for four years.

Magnussen coached for eleven years in Boston before returning to the North Shore Winter Club in North Vancouver, British Columbia. In addition to teaching figure skaters, she has also worked with hockey players to improve edges, power, balance, and stops and starts.

Despite the elimination of figures by the ISU, Magnussen considers it beneficial to learn them in some form, saying in 2009, "Instead of doing figures on a patch of ice we do it in a more free form, but we still have to get skaters back to basics." The Karen Magnussen Community Recreation Centre in North Vancouver is named after her. To assist young skaters, Magnussen established the Karen Magnussen Foundation. Magnussen was the last Canadian woman to win the World title until Kaetlyn Osmond in 2018, 45 years later.

On November 28, 2011, an ammonia leak occurred at the North Shore Winter Club where Magnussen was working; she said it caused her breathing problems, hampered her ability to speak, impaired her vision, and left her chronically fatigued. Following the incident and treatment with the powerful steroid prednisone, she gained 60 pounds and developed rheumatoid arthritis, temporal arteritis (swelling of blood vessels to the head), and central sensitivity syndrome (affecting the interaction between the brain and vocal cords). WorkSafeBC inspectors cited the club for twelve health and safety violations. Interviewed by CBC in December 2013, Magnussen said compensation benefits ceased when WorkSafeBC realized her disability was permanent. As of 2015, she continued to suffer serious health problems and may not enter a rink due to the risk from fumes. The Connaught Skating Club organized a benefit show for Magnussen in March 2015.

== Results ==
Event	1965	1966	1967	1968	1969	1970	1971	1972	1973
Winter Olympics				7th				2nd	
World Championships			12th	7th		4th	3rd	2nd	1st
North American Champ.			4th		2nd		1st		
Canadian Champ.	1st J.	4th	2nd	1st	2nd	1st	1st	1st	1st
