= Jim Sladky =

American ice dancer

Personal information
- Full name: James Sladky
- Born: March 16, 1947 Bridgeport, Connecticut
- Died: November 9, 2017 (aged 70)

Figure skating career
- Country: United States
- Partner: Judy Schwomeyer
- Coach: Ron Ludington
- Skating club: Genesee FSC
Medal record
Figure skating: Ice dancing
Representing the United States
World Championships
Bronze medal – third place	1972 Calgary	Ice dancing
Bronze medal – third place	1971 Lyon	Ice dancing
Silver medal – second place	1970 Ljubljana	Ice dancing
Bronze medal – third place	1969 Colorado Springs	Ice dancing
North American Championships
Gold medal – first place	1971 Peterborough	Ice dancing
Silver medal – second place	1969 Oakland	Ice dancing
Bronze medal – third place	1967 Montreal	Ice dancing

James Sladky (March 16, 1947 – November 9, 2017) was an American competitive ice dancer. With his skating partner, Judy Schwomeyer, he became a four-time World medalist (silver in 1970; bronze in 1969, 1971, 1972) and five-time U.S. national champion (1968–1972).

== Personal life ==
James Sladky was born on March 16, 1947. He was married to Judy Schwomeyer from 1971 to 1990. He later married Fay Kelley from 1996 to 2017. He worked as a hotel engineer in Hartford, Connecticut.

== Career ==
Schwomeyer/Sladky won five national titles, from 1968 to 1972. They finished on the podium at four World Championships, (winning silver in 1970 and bronze in 1969, 1971, and 1972).

They were coached by Ron Ludington. Together with Ludington, Schwomeyer/Sladky created the Yankee Polka compulsory dance. They first performed it as a competitive program in 1969. Following their retirement from competitive skating, the duo skated professionally.

They were inducted into the United States Figure Skating Hall of Fame in 1991.

== Results ==
(with Judy Schwomeyer)

International
Event	1966	1967	1968	1969	1970	1971	1972
World Championships		8th	4th	3rd	2nd	3rd	3rd
North American Champ.		3rd		2nd		1st	
National
U.S. Championships	6th	3rd	1st	1st	1st	1st	1st
