= Brunhilde Baßler =

German pair skater

Personal information
- Other names: Brunhilde Bassler; Bruni Skotnicky

Figure skating career
- Country: West Germany
- Partner: Eberhard Rausch
- Skating club: Mannheimer ERC e.V.
- Retired: c. 1971

Brunhilde "Bruni" Baßler (Bassler), married surname: Skotnicky, is a former pair skater who represented West Germany. In 1970, she and her skating partner, Eberhard Rausch, won gold at the Kennedy Memorial Winter Games and West German Championships. The pair finished in the top ten at four ISU Championships — 1969 Worlds in Colorado Springs, Colorado, United States; 1970 Europeans in Leningrad, Soviet Union; 1970 Worlds in Ljubljana, Yugoslavia; and 1971 Europeans in Zürich, Switzerland. Their partnership ended in 1971.

Baßler also competed in roller skating. During her competitive career, she was a member of Mannheimer ERC e.V. After retiring from competition, she became a skating coach based in Oberstdorf. She married Slovak ice dancer Martin Skotnický.

== Competitive highlights ==
With Eberhard Rausch

International
Event	66–67	67–68	68–69	69–70	70–71
World Championships			9th	9th	12th
European Championships				8th	7th
Kennedy Memorial Winter Games				1st	
National
West German Championships	3rd		3rd	1st	2nd
