= Charlotte Walter =

Swiss figure skater

Personal information
- Born: 8 October 1951 (age 74) Aarau, Switzerland
- Height: 1.67 m (5 ft 5 1/2 in)

Figure skating career
- Country: Switzerland
- Skating club: EC Zürich
- Retired: c. 1972

Charlotte Walter (born 8 October 1951 in Aarau) is a Swiss former figure skater who competed in ladies' singles. She won the gold medal at the Swiss Figure Skating Championships for five straight years, from 1968 to 1972. She finished in the top ten at three ISU Championships — 1971 Europeans in Zurich, Switzerland; 1971 Worlds in Lyon, France; and 1972 Europeans in Gothenburg, Sweden. She placed 22nd at the 1968 Winter Olympics in Grenoble and 9th at the 1972 Winter Olympics in Sapporo.

== Competitive highlights ==
International
Event	65–66	66–67	67–68	68–69	69–70	70–71	71–72
Winter Olympics			22nd				9th
World Champ.		20th	16th	15th	13th	8th	
European Champ.			15th	11th	11th	5th	6th
Kennedy Memorial					WD		
Prague Skate	9th	6th					
Richmond Trophy							C
National
Swiss Champ.			1st	1st	1st	1st	1st
C = Competed, final result unknown. WD = Withdrew
