= Ruth Hutchinson =

Canadian figure skater

Ruth Hutchinson is a Canadian former figure skater.

== Results ==
Event	1971	1972
World Championships	19th	
Canadian Championships	2nd	2nd
