= Slavka Kohout =

American figure skating coach (1932–2024)

Slavka Kohout Button (December 14, 1932 – March 17, 2024) was an American figure skating coach and former competitor, best known for coaching five-time U.S. Champion Janet Lynn throughout her entire competitive career.

== Early life ==
Kohout was born in Chicago to Czech parents. Her first coach was her father, a successful florist, who learned to skate from a book. Her mother was an artist.

== Career ==
As a skater, Kohout was twice the Midwestern sectional senior ladies champion, and she won the bronze medal in the 1950 U.S. junior ladies championships. After turning professional, she was manager and head coach at the Wagon Wheel Ice Palace in Rockton, Illinois for 17 years. During that period, the Wagon Wheel rink—part of a larger resort complex—was one of the top figure skating training centers in the United States. Kohout coached not only Lynn but also 3-time U.S. champion Gordon McKellen, several other international competitors, and other skaters who have gone on to become prominent coaches or skating judges, such as Shepherd Clark, The 2017, 2018, 2019 World Figure & Fancy Skating Champion of World Figure Sport / "WFS", at which Kohout was an official, an honoree, and a 2015 World Figure Sport Hall of Fame inductee in Lake Placid, NY.

Slavka Kohout was inducted into the United States Figure Skating Hall of Fame in 2002.

== Personal life ==
Kohout left Wagon Wheel when she married Dick Button in 1973. They had children Emily and Edward together, but subsequently divorced. In later years, Kohout continued to coach in the New York City area.
