= World Figure Sport Society =

The World Figure Sport Society (WFSS) is a not-for-profit organization dedicated to the revival of Figures and Fancy Skating and not just compulsory figures (or school figures), which were formerly a segment of figure skating and gave the sport its name. Figures are the "circular patterns which skaters trace on the ice to demonstrate skill in placing clean turns evenly on round circles". For approximately the first 50 years of figure skating as a sport, until 1947, compulsory figures made up 60 percent of the total score at most competitions around the world. These figures continued to dominate the sport, although they steadily declined in importance, until the International Skating Union (ISU) voted to discontinue them as a part of competitions in 1990.

The WFSS, dedicated to the revival of figures and fancy skating, was created in 2015 by 1994 Olympian and figures expert, Karen Courtland Kelly. Its operations are based in Lake Placid, New York. Also in 2015, WFSS' Skating Hall of Fame was formed and the first World Figure Championship on black ice was held and renamed the World Figure and Fancy Skating Championships, or WFFSC, after the literary skating masterpiece that was written in 1895 by George A. Meagher (the "Champion Figure Skater of the World" starting in 1891).

In 2015, Olympic champion and commentator Dick Button attended and he was the first inducted into World Figure Sport's Skating Hall of Fame and also commentated for the World Figure Championship's live stream. Simultaneously WFSS hosted the Figure Festival (on the same world championship's black ice), an event that allowed skaters to practice figures and learn the art of skating from experts. According to the WFSS, the festival was open for all ages and skating levels; coaches from all disciplines conducted workshops for participants, both on and off the ice. In 2023, the festival was free of charge, open to the public, and included art and historical exhibits, performances, and workshops and tutoring sessions for all ages, skating levels, and disabilities.

Kelly, who was the first female Olympian to teach figures and fancy skating and who conducted online workshops about figures, organized and commentated live-streamed broadcasts of the world championships. As of 2019, Kelly was the president of WFSS. By 2023, nine WFFSC on black ice had been held.

== Works cited ==
- Meagher, George A. (1895). Figure and Fancy Skating. London: Bliss, Sands, and Foster.
- Hines, James R. (2006). Figure Skating: A History. Urbana, Illinois: University of Illinois Press. ISBN 978-0-252-07286-4.
