= Gheorghe Fazekas =

Romanian figure skater

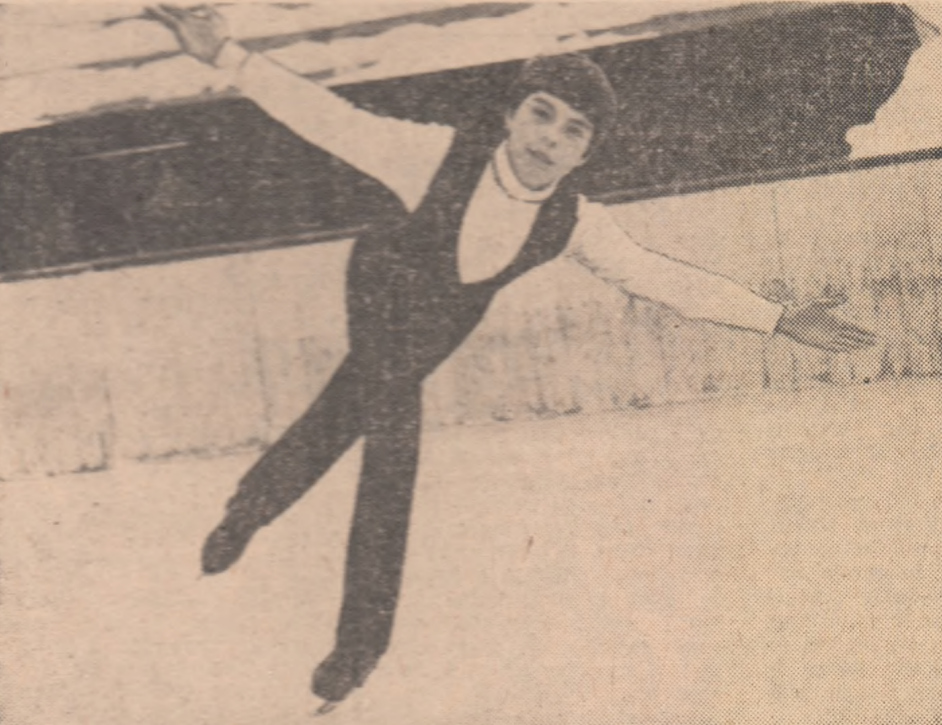

Personal information
- Other names: György Fazekas
- Born: 2 January 1958 (age 68) Odorheiu Secuiesc, Romania

Figure skating career
- Country: Romania
- Retired: c. 1974

Gheorghe (or György) Fazekas (born 2 January 1958) is an ethnically Hungarian, but Romanian former figure skater. He represented Romania at the 1972 Winter Olympics in Sapporo, Japan. He also competed at multiple World and European Championships.

== Competitive highlights ==
Event	68–69	69–70	70–71	71–72	72–73	73–74
Winter Olympics				17th		
World Championships			21st		23rd	24th
European Championships	22nd	22nd	18th	18th	18th	23rd
Nebelhorn Trophy			2nd			
Prague Skate			8th			
Romanian Championships	1st	1st	1st	1st	1st	
