= Stefano Bargauan =

Italian figure skater

Personal information
- Born: c. 1954
- Died: June 2013

Figure skating career
- Country: Italy
- Partner: Letizia Ghirardelli
- Retired: 1970s

Stefano Bargauan (c. 1954 – June 2013) was an Italian figure skater. Competing in men's singles, he was the 1971 Prague Skate champion, 1970 Kennedy Memorial Winter Games bronze medalist, and Italian national champion. He also competed in ice dancing with Letizia Ghirardelli.

His siblings, Michele and Willy, also competed in figure skating. The family worked in television broadcasting.

== Competitive highlights ==
International
Event	1966–67	1967–68	1968–69	1969–70	1970–71	1971–72	1972–73	1973-74
World Champ.					18th	17th		
European Champ.				18th	16th	13th		
Golden Spin of Zagreb			3rd					
Kennedy Memorial				3rd				
Prague Skate	10th				3rd	1st		
National
Italian Champ.	2nd		1st	1st	1st	1st	1st	2nd
