= Melissa Militano =

American figure skater (1955–2024)

Personal information
- Full name: Melissa Mary Militano
- Other names: Melissa Mary Warkmeister
- Born: April 26, 1955 Rockville Centre, New York, U.S.
- Died: July 16, 2024 (aged 69) Las Vegas, Nevada, U.S.
- Height: 5 ft 0 in (152 cm)

Figure skating career
- Country: United States
- Skating club: SC of New York
- Retired: 1975
Medal record
Pairs' Figure skating
Representing United States
North American Championships
Silver medal – second place	1971 Peterborough	Pairs

Melissa Mary Militano (later Warkmeister; April 26, 1955 – July 16, 2024) was an American competitive figure skater who competed as a single skater and pair skater. As a pair skater, she won the U.S. Figure Skating Championships three times, in 1973 with her brother Mark Militano and in 1974 and 1975 with Johnny Johns. Their coaches included Peter Dunfield and Ron Ludington.

== Biography ==
Melissa and Mark Militano represented the United States at the 1972 Winter Olympics where they placed 7th.

Militano was also a talented singles skater. At the 1970 United States Figure Skating Championships, she became one of the first female skaters to successfully perform a triple toe loop jump in competition, in a performance that won her the bronze medal in the junior ladies division. At the 1971 U.S. Figure Skating Championships, she won the junior ladies title, again landing a clean triple toe loop. She later gave up competing in singles skating to focus on pairs.

Militano and Johns retired from competitive skating in 1975 and toured with Ice Capades. After her marriage in 1979, she had little involvement with skating for many years, but later worked as a part-time coach in Las Vegas, Nevada. She died there after a brief battle with lymphoma on July 16, 2024, at the age of 69.

== Competitive highlights ==
=== Ladies' singles ===
National
Event	1970	1971	1972
U.S. Championships	3rd J	1st J	8th
J = Junior level

=== Pairs with Johnny Johns ===
International
Event	1974	1975
World Championships	8th	6th
National
U.S. Championships	1st	1st

=== Pairs with Mark Militano ===
International
Event	1969	1970	1971	1972	1973
Winter Olympics				7th	
World Championships	8th	8th	6th	9th	8th
North American Champ.	4th		2nd		
National
U.S. Championships	3rd	2nd	2nd	2nd	1st
