= Cinzia Frosio =

Italian figure skater

Figure skating career
- Country: Italy
- Coach: Carlo Fassi; Helmut Seibt; Inge Regner-Seibt
- Skating club: A.S.G.A. Como

Cinzia Frosio is an Italian former competitive figure skater. She is a two-time (1973, 1974) Italian national champion and competed at nine ISU Championships, finishing in the top ten at the 1973 Europeans in Cologne.

Frosio was a member of Associazione Sportivi Ghiaccio Ambrosiana (A.S.G.A) in Como. Her coaches included Helmut Seibt and Inge Regner-Seibt. By January 1973, when she won her first senior national title, she had moved from Italy to Denver, Colorado to train under Carlo Fassi. In October of the same year, she competed at the inaugural Skate Canada International.

== Competitive highlights ==
Event	68–69	69–70	70–71	71–72	72–73	73–74
World Championships			22nd	14th	19th	17th
European Championships		16th	16th	16th	9th	11th
Kennedy Memorial		8th				
Prague Skate			6th			
Prize of Moscow News				4th		
Italian Championships	2nd		2nd		1st	1st
