= Linda Carbonetto =

Canadian figure skater

Personal information
- Other names: Linda Villella; Linda Engel
- Born: April 12, 1949 (age 77) New York City, US
- Height: 1.59 m (5 ft 3 in)

Figure skating career
- Country: Canada
- Skating club: Toronto Cricket, Skating and Curling Club; Blenheim FSC
- Retired: 1969
Medal record
Representing Canada
Figure skating: Ladies' singles
North American Championships
Bronze medal – third place	1969 Oakland	Ladies' singles

Linda Carbonetto, married names: Engel, Villella (born April 12, 1949) is a Canadian former competitive figure skater. She is the 1969 Canadian national champion and competed at the 1968 Winter Olympics. She was born in New York City and raised in Ontario.

Carbonetto turned professional in 1970 and toured professionally with Ice Capades. She serves as the School Director for the Miami City Ballet. Her second husband is Edward Villella. She was also married to Peter Engel for a time.

== Competitive highlights ==
International
Event	1965	1966	1967	1968	1969
Winter Olympics				13th	
World Championships				13th	6th
North American Champ.					3rd
National
Canadian Champ.	3rd J.			2nd	1st
J. = Junior level
