= Kenneth Shelley =

American figure skater

Personal information
- Full name: Kenneth Gene Shelley
- Born: October 4, 1951 (age 74) Downey, California, U.S.

Figure skating career
- Country: United States
- Skating club: Arctic Blades FSC
Medal record
Representing United States
Men's singles Figure skating
North American Championships
Bronze medal – third place	1971 Peterborough	Men's singles
Pairs' Figure skating
World Championships
Bronze medal – third place	1972 Calgary	Pairs
Bronze medal – third place	1971 Lyon	Pairs
North American Championships
Gold medal – first place	1971 Peterborough	Pairs
Silver medal – second place	1969 Oakland	Pairs

Kenneth Gene Shelley (born October 4, 1951) is an American figure skater who competed in both singles and pairs. As a single skater, he won the 1972 United States Figure Skating Championships and placed 4th at the 1972 Winter Olympics. His highest placement at the World Figure Skating Championships was a single skater was 7th, in 1972. As a pair skater, he competed with JoJo Starbuck, with whom he is a three-time National Champion. Starbuck and Shelley competed in two Olympic Games, placing 13th in 1968 and 4th in 1972, and won two bronze medals at the World Figure Skating Championships. When they made the 1968 Olympic team, they were the youngest athletes the United States had ever sent to the Olympics.

Shelley was from Downey, California. He was first paired with Starbuck for a show in 1959, when they were very small children. They started training seriously with coach John Nicks at the Arctic Blades FSC in 1961. In their first year of senior competitions, when they were both 16 years old, they qualified to compete at the 1968 Winter Olympics. Both Starbuck and Shelley attended Downey High School, where they performed off-ice lifts with the cheerleading squad and Long Beach State College.

In the summer of 1969, Shelley had a serious off-ice accident, crashing through a glass patio door at a party. He had surgery to repair two severed tendons and spent five weeks in a cast.

After retiring from competitive skating, Starbuck and Shelley skated in the Ice Capades and competed professionally. Shelley was inducted into the U.S. Figure Skating Hall of Fame in 1994.

== Results ==
=== Men's singles ===
Event	1968	1970	1971	1972
Winter Olympics				4th
World Championships		8th	8th	7th
North American Championships			3rd	
U.S. Championships	1st J	3rd	2nd	1st

=== Pairs ===
(with JoJo Starbuck)

Event	1967	1968	1969	1970	1971	1972
Winter Olympic Games		13th				4th
World Championships		11th	6th	5th	3rd	3rd
North American Championships			2nd		1st	
U.S. Championships	1st J.	3rd	2nd	1st	1st	1st
