= Anita Johansson (figure skater) =

Swedish figure skater (born 1954)

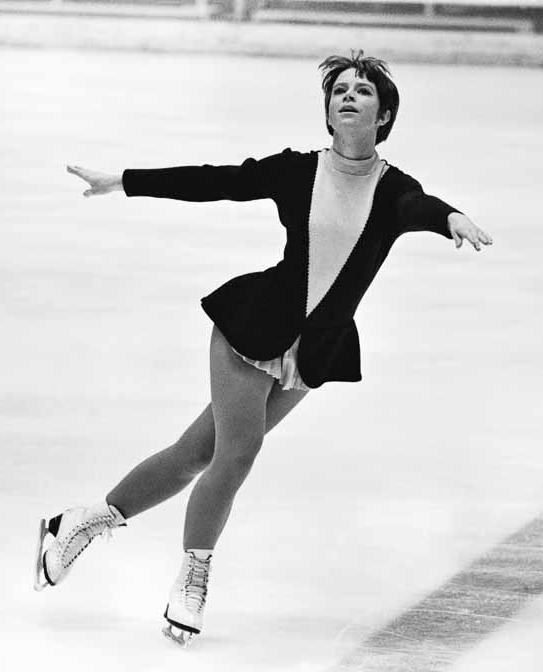
- Johansson at the 1972 Olympics

Personal information
- Full name: Bodil Anita Johansson
- Born: 19 August 1954 (age 71) Malmö, Sweden

Figure skating career
- Country: Sweden
- Skating club: Malmö Figure Skating Club

Bodil Anita Johansson, later surname Jacobson (born 19 August 1954) is a former Swedish figure skater from Malmö. She competed at the 1972 Winter Olympics.

== Results ==
International
Event	1969–70	1970–71	1971–72
Winter Olympics			15th
World Championships		17th	
European Championships	21st	15th	14th
Nordic Championships	1st	2nd	
Blue Swords		5th	2nd
National
Swedish Championships	1st	1st	1st
