= Hiroshi Nagakubo =

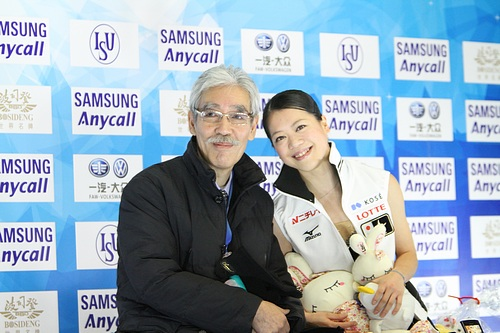
- Nagakubo alongside Akiko Suzuki, 2010.

Personal information
- Born: December 14, 1946 (age 79) Yamanashi Prefecture, Japan
- Height: 1.80 m (5 ft 11 in)

Figure skating career
- Country: Japan
- Partner: Kotoe Nagasawa
- Skating club: Nippon University
- Retired: 1972

Hiroshi Nagakubo

Japanese name
- Kanji: 長久保裕
- Kana: ながくぼ ひろし
Transcriptions
- Romanization: Nagakubo Hiroshi

Hiroshi Nagakubo (長久 保裕, Nagakubo Hiroshi; born December 14, 1946) is a Japanese former figure skating coach and pair skater. With his skating partner, Kotoe Nagasawa, he became a five-time (1967–1971) Japanese national champion and competed at the 1972 Winter Olympics, placing 16th.

After retiring from competition, Nagakubo became a coach at the Howa Sports Land Skating Club in the Aichi Prefecture. He ceased coaching on September 3, 2017, due to family circumstances. During his career, his students included:

- Shizuka Arakawa
- Ryuju Hino
- Takeshi Honda
- Rika Hongo
- Haruka Imai
- Yura Matsuda
- Rin Nitaya
- Akiko Suzuki. He coached Suzuki from the early 2000s until her retirement in 2014.
- Sota Yamamoto
- Yuhana Yokoi

== Competitive highlights ==
with Kotoe Nagasawa

International
Event	67–68	68–69	69–70	70–71	71–72
Winter Olympics					16th
World Championships			16th	15th	
National
Japan Championships	1st	1st	1st	1st	1st
