= Trixi Schuba =

Austrian figure skater (born 1951)

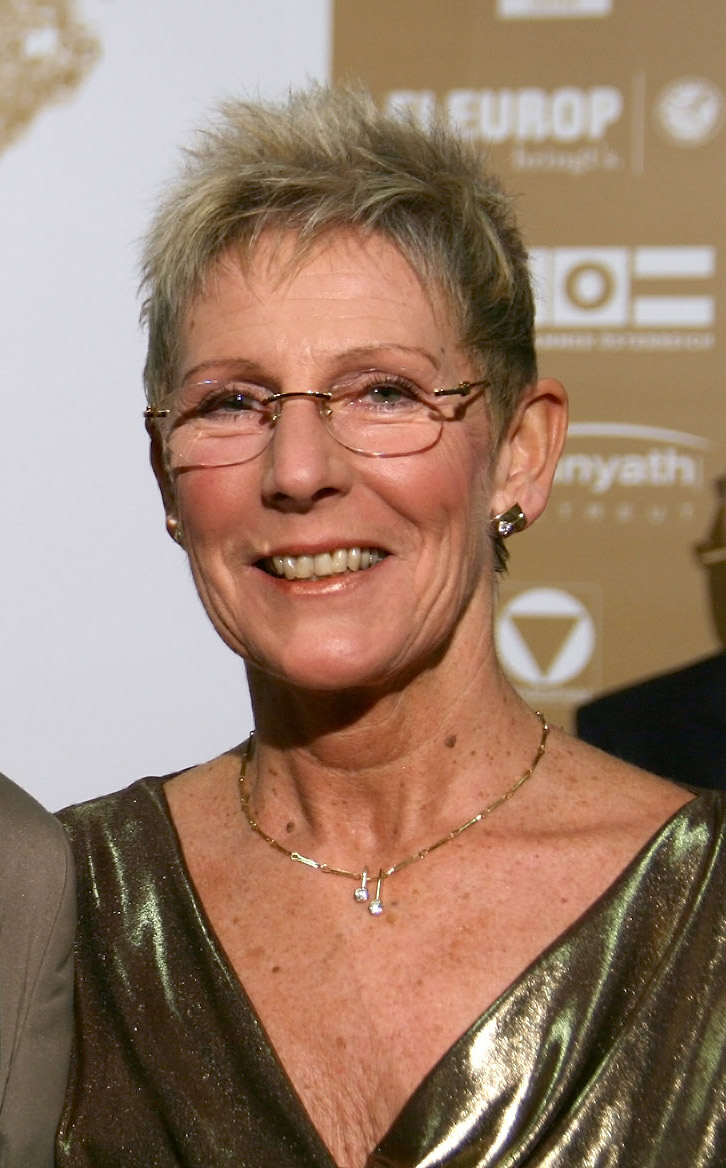
- Beatrix Schuba in 2011

Personal information
- Born: 15 April 1951 (age 75) Vienna
- Height: 5 ft 7 in (170 cm)

Figure skating career
- Country: Austria
- Skating club: Wien
- Retired: 1973
Medal record
Ladies' Figure skating
Representing Austria
Olympic Games
Gold medal – first place	1972 Sapporo	Ladies' singles
World Championships
Gold medal – first place	1972 Calgary	Ladies' singles
Gold medal – first place	1971 Lyon	Ladies' singles
Silver medal – second place	1970 Ljubljana	Ladies' singles
Silver medal – second place	1969 Colorado Springs	Ladies' singles
European Championships
Gold medal – first place	1972 Gothenburg	Ladies' singles
Gold medal – first place	1971 Zürich	Ladies' singles
Silver medal – second place	1970 Leningrad	Ladies' singles
Bronze medal – third place	1969 Garmisch-Partenkirchen	Ladies' singles
Bronze medal – third place	1968 Västerås	Ladies' singles

Beatrix "Trixi" Schuba (born 15 April 1951) is an Austrian former competitive figure skater who competed in women's singles. She is a six-time Austrian national champion (1967–1972), a two-time European champion (1971 and 1972), a two-time World champion (1971 and 1972), and 1972 Olympic champion.

She was noted for her skill in compulsory figures.

== Early life ==
Schuba was born in Vienna. After her father died when she was thirteen, she went to trade school and eventually took over the bookkeeping of her family's lumber business in Vienna; mornings were given to skating and afternoons to work.

== Competitive career ==
Schuba's interest in figure skating began as a young child in 1955 when she happened to see an American competition on the television bought by her parents to watch performances of the Vienna State Opera and the Burgtheater. She was coached by Helmut Seibt from 1955 to 1962, and then by Leopold Linhart.

Her first major success was winning the women's singles portion of the Austrian Championships at the age of sixteen in 1967; she would go on to defend her title five straight times. Schuba steadily improved throughout the end of the 1960s and the early 1970s, placing in the top five several times and eventually taking first twice each at the European Championships and the World Championships in 1971 and 1972.

Schuba's greatest success came in 1972 at the Winter Olympics at Sapporo, when she won the gold medal. She is the first Austrian woman since Herma Szabo in 1924 to win gold and is the most recent. Schuba, the dominant compulsory figures skater, placed first in the figures, and Janet Lynn of the United States, the top free skater, placed first after the free skate. As the scoring system used at the time placed more weight on figures, Schuba won the gold medal and Lynn won the bronze behind silver medalist Karen Magnussen of Canada.

The International Skating Union, the governing body of the sport, would decrease the weight given to the figures portion over the ensuing years before finally eliminating it in 1990. Scuba, considered one of the best compulsory figure skaters ever, was also considered weak in free skating.

After winning gold at Sapporo, Schuba did the same the next month at the World Championships, successfully defending against silver medalist Magnussen and bronze medalist Lynn. At the end of the year, sportswriters named her Athlete of the Year for 1972.

== Later career ==
Retiring from amateur skating, Schuba appeared over the succeeding six years in the professional shows Ice Follies and Holiday on Ice, after which she began a career in the insurance industry. At her workplace, because she spoke English well, she worked with United Nations diplomats based in Vienna. She retired in 2015. In 2026, it was reported she had stopped skating several years earlier because of the danger of falling.

In addition to her career in insurance, Schuba is involved in various sports organizations in Austria. She is a former president of the Austrian Ice Skating Association, the first woman to hold that position, and she sat on the board of the Austrian Olympic Committee from 2004 to 2009. Schuba has served as president of the International Panathlon Club Wien since 2007, on the board of the Austrian Paralympic Committee since 2009, and as vice president of the Graz Skating Association since 2010.

== Results ==
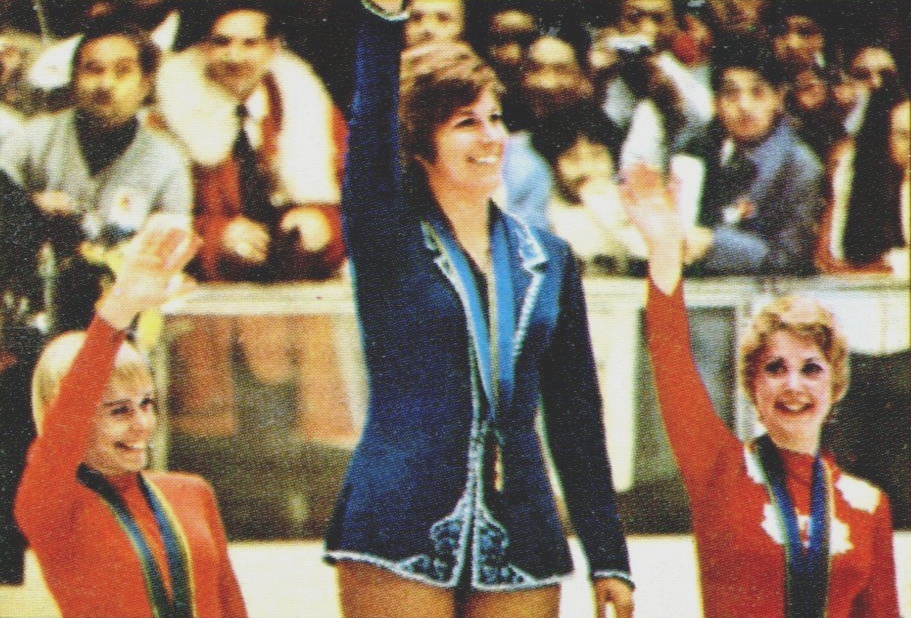
Schuba (center) at the 1972 Winter Olympics

International
Event	1967	1968	1969	1970	1971	1972
Winter Olympics		5th				1st
World Championships	9th	4th	2nd	2nd	1st	1st
European Championships	5th	3rd	3rd	2nd	1st	1st
Richmond Trophy		2nd				
National
Austrian Championships	1st	1st	1st	1st	1st	1st
