= Axel Salzmann =

German pair skater

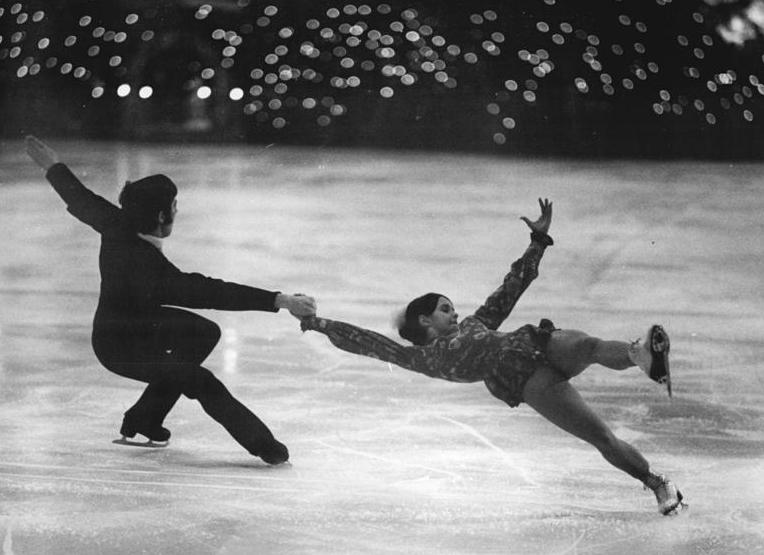
- Annette Kansy and Salzmann, 1970

Personal information
- Born: 30 September 1950 (age 75) Chemnitz, Sachsen, East Germany
- Height: 5 ft 10 in (178 cm)

Figure skating career
- Country: East Germany

Axel Salzmann (born 30 September 1950) was a German pair skater.

Competing with partner Annette Kansy, Salzmann competed at the 1972 Winter Olympics. They twice won the silver medal at the East German Figure Skating Championships.

== Results ==
Pairs with Kansy

International
| Event | 1969–70 | 1970–71 | 1971–72 |
|---|---|---|---|
| Winter Olympics | | | 8th |
| World Championships | | 7th | 7th |
| European Championships | 6th | | 5th |
| Prize of Moscow News | | 8th | |
National
| East German Champ. | 3rd | 2nd | 2nd |
