= JoJo Starbuck =

American figure skater

Personal information
- Other names: Alicia Starbuck
- Born: February 14, 1951 (age 75) Birmingham, Alabama, U.S.

Figure skating career
- Country: United States
- Skating club: Arctic Blades FSC
Medal record
Representing United States
Pairs' Figure skating
World Championships
Bronze medal – third place	1972 Calgary	Pairs
Bronze medal – third place	1971 Lyon	Pairs
North American Championships
Gold medal – first place	1971 Peterborough	Pairs
Silver medal – second place	1969 Oakland	Pairs

Alicia "JoJo" Starbuck (born February 14, 1951, Birmingham, Alabama), is an American figure skater. With partner Kenneth Shelley, she is a three-time United States pair skating champion (1970–72) and two-time Olympian (1968, 1972).

== Early life and youth career ==
Starbuck was raised in Downey, California and attended Cerritos College, along with Kenneth Shelley. She was first paired with Shelley for a show in 1959, when they were small children. They started training with coach John Nicks at the Arctic Blades FSC in 1961.

== Championship career ==
In their first year of senior competitions, at age 16, they qualified to compete at the 1968 Winter Olympics. Both Starbuck and Shelley attended Downey High School, where they performed off-ice lifts with the cheerleading squad, and Long Beach State College.

Like Shelley, Starbuck was a skilled singles skater. While Shelley went on to win the national title in singles as well as pairs in 1972, Starbuck retired from singles competition in 1968.

Success would be found in pairs. Shelley and Starbuck became three-time United States pair skating champions (1970–72) and two-time Olympians (1968, 1972). In the first Olympics they finished 13th, in the second 4th.

== Later career ==
After turning professional, Starbuck made occasional appearances skating singles in addition to continuing to skate pairs with Shelley. She partnered John Curry in the "Tango Tango" number from his show Ice Dancing.

Starbuck performed for a short time with the Ice Capades. From 1976 to 1983, she was married to football quarterback Terry Bradshaw. She was Bradshaw's second wife. During this time she also became well known as the face of Cup of Noodles, introducing millions of Americans for the first time to ramen.

Starbuck currently is affiliated with the Rink at Rockefeller Plaza a position she has had since the 1990s.

She had a minor career as an actress, performing in New York Stories (1989), The Cutting Edge (1992), and the TV movie Beauty and the Beast: A Concert on Ice (1996).

She continues to coach and choreograph. Starbuck lives in Madison, New Jersey, where she teaches at the Essex Skating Club of New Jersey.

== Results ==
(pairs with Kenneth Shelley)

Event	1967	1968	1969	1970	1971	1972
Winter Olympic Games		13th				4th
World Championships		11th	6th	5th	3rd	3rd
North American Championships			2nd		1st	
U.S. Championships	1st J.	3rd	2nd	1st	1st	1st
