= Kotoe Nagasawa =

Personal information
- Born: June 11, 1950 (age 76) Shizuoka Prefecture, Japan
- Height: 1.54 m (5 ft 1/2 in)

Figure skating career
- Country: Japan
- Partner: Hiroshi Nagakubo
- Skating club: Nippon University
- Retired: 1972

Kotoe Nagasawa

Japanese name
- Kanji: 長沢琴枝
- Kana: ながさわ ことえ
Transcriptions
- Romanization: Nagasawa Kotoe

Kotoe Nagasawa (長沢 琴枝, Nagasawa Kotoe; born June 11, 1950 in Shizuoka Prefecture) is a Japanese figure skating coach and former competitive pair skater. With her skating partner, Hiroshi Nagakubo, she became a five-time (1967–1971) Japanese national champion and competed at the 1972 Winter Olympics, placing 16th.

After retiring from competition, Nagasawa became a skating coach in Japan.

== Competitive highlights ==
(with Nagakubo)

International
Event	67–68	68–69	69–70	70–71	71–72
Winter Olympics					16th
World Championships			16th	15th	
National
Japan Championships	1st	1st	1st	1st	1st
