= Annette Kansy =

German figure skater

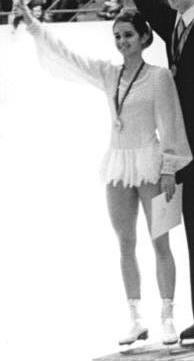
- Annette Kansy in 1971

Personal information
- Born: 13 June 1955 (age 71) Dresden, Sachsen, East Germany
- Height: 5 ft 0 in (152 cm)

Figure skating career
- Country: East Germany

Annette Kansy (born 13 June 1955) is a former East German pair skater.

Competing with partner Axel Salzmann, Kansy competed at the 1972 Winter Olympics. They twice won the silver medal at the East German Figure Skating Championships.

== Results ==
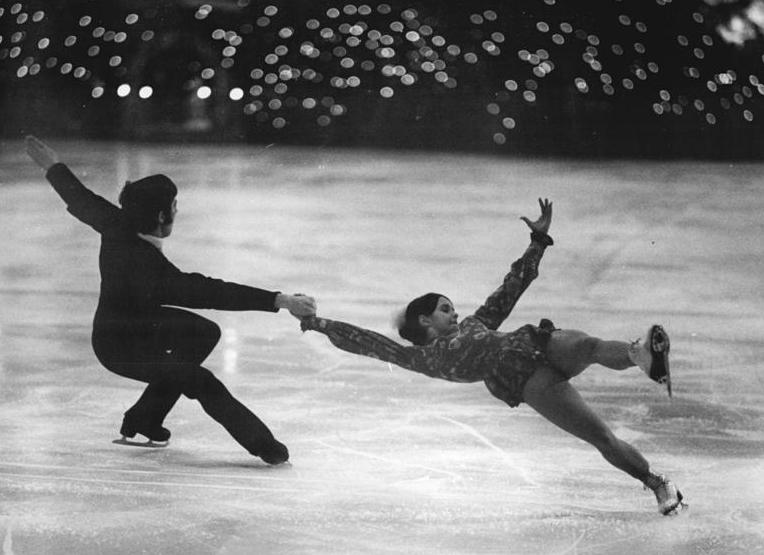
Kansy and Axel Salzmann, 1970

Pairs with Salzmann

International
Event	1969–70	1970–71	1971–72
Winter Olympics			8th
World Championships		7th	7th
European Championships	6th		5th
Prize of Moscow News		8th	
National
East German Champ.	3rd	2nd	2nd
