= Almut Lehmann =

German pair skater (born 1953)

Almut Lehmann (married name: Peyper) (born 10 June 1953 in Stuttgart) is a German former pair skater who competed for West Germany.

With partner Herbert Wiesinger, she is a three-time German national champion and 1973 European bronze medalist. They placed 5th at the 1972 Winter Olympics. They represented the club SC Rießersee.

Following her retirement from competitive skating, she skated professionally with the Ice Capades.

== Competitive highlights ==
with Wiesinger

International
Event	1969–70	1970–71	1971–72	1972–73
Winter Olympics			5th	
World Championships	6th	5th	5th	4th
European Champ.	5th	5th	4th	3rd
Nebelhorn Trophy		1st		
Prize of Moscow News		5th		
National
West German Champ.	2nd	1st	1st	1st
