= Val Bezic =

Canadian pair skater

Personal information
- Full name: Val Nicholas Bezic
- Born: December 8, 1952 (age 73) Toronto, Ontario, Canada
- Height: 185 cm (6 ft 1 in)

Figure skating career
- Country: Canada
- Skating club: TCS & CC
Medal record
Representing Canada
Pairs' Figure skating
North American Championships
Bronze medal – third place	1971 Peterborough	Pairs

Val Nicholas Bezic (born December 8, 1952) is a Canadian pair skater. With his sister Sandra Bezic, he won the Canadian Figure Skating Championships from 1970–1974 and placed ninth at the 1972 Winter Olympics. They were a five-time national champion in pairs and came in fifth place at the 1974 Worlds Championships. He is of Croatian descent.

== Results ==
Pair skating with Sandra Bezic

International
Event	68–69	69–70	70–71	71–72	72–73	73–74
Winter Olympics				9th		
World Championships		14th	9th	8th	6th	5th
North American Champ.	5th		3rd			
International St. Gervais			1st			
National
Canadian Champ.	3rd	1st	1st	1st	1st	1st
Canadian Junior Champ.	2nd					

== Literature ==
- Eterovich, Adam S. Croatia at the Olympics, 1890s-1980s (!?!). // CROWN – Croatian World Network, [Bach, Nenad N. (ed.)], ISSN 1847-3911, 08/3/2004, Retrieved 2010-02-17
