= Doug Berndt =

American figure skater

Douglas Brian Berndt (born September 10, 1949, in Denver, Colorado; died February 2, 1995, in Denver) was an American figure skater. He competed in pairs with partner Barbara Brown. The duo twice won the bronze medal at the U.S. Figure Skating Championships and competed in the 1972 Winter Olympics.

Following his skating career, Berndt was a flight attendant with United Airlines.

== Results ==
(pairs with Barbara Brown)

Event	1970	1971	1972
Winter Olympic Games			12th
World Championships		11th	14th
U.S. Championships	1st J.	3rd	3rd

(Men's singles)

Event	1969	1970
U.S. Championships	2nd J.	11th
