= Barbara Brown (figure skater) =

American figure skater

Barbara Marie Brown (born July 21, 1953 in Denver, Colorado) is an American former figure skater. She competed in pairs with partner Doug Berndt. The duo twice won the bronze medal at the U.S. Figure Skating Championships and competed in the 1972 Winter Olympics.

== Results ==
(pairs with Doug Berndt)

Event	1970	1971	1972
Winter Olympic Games			12th
World Championships		11th	14th
U.S. Championships	1st J.	3rd	3rd
