= 1998 Trophée Lalique =

- Type: Grand Prix
- Date: 20 – 22 November
- Season: 1998–99
- Location: Paris
- Venue: Palais Omnisports de Paris-Bercy

Champions
- Men's singles: (Russia) Alexei Yagudin
- Ladies' singles: (Russia) Maria Butyrskaya
- Pairs: (France) Sarah Abitbol / Stéphane Bernadis
- Ice dance: (France) Marina Anissina / Gwendal Peizerat
- Previous: 1997 Trophée Lalique
- Next: 1999 Trophée Lalique
- Previous GP: 1998 Sparkassen Cup on Ice
- Next GP: 1998 Cup of Russia

The 1998 Trophée Lalique was the fourth event of six in the 1998–99 ISU Grand Prix of Figure Skating, a senior-level international invitational competition series. It was held at the Palais Omnisports de Paris-Bercy in Paris on 20–22 November. Medals were awarded in the disciplines of men's singles, ladies' singles, pair skating, and ice dancing. Skaters earned points toward qualifying for the 1998–99 Grand Prix Final.

== Results ==
=== Men ===
Rank	Name	Nation	TFP	SP	FS
1	Alexei Yagudin	Russia	2.0	2	1
2	Michael Weiss	United States	2.5	1	2
3	Emmanuel Sandhu	Canada	5.5	5	3
4	Dmitry Dmitrenko	Ukraine	5.5	3	4
5	Laurent Tobel	France	8.0	4	6
6	Andrejs Vlascenko	Germany	9.0	8	5
7	Roman Skornyakov	Uzbekistan	11.0	6	8
8	Sven Meyer	Germany	11.5	9	7
9	Thierry Cerez	France	12.5	7	9
10	Makoto Okazaki	Japan	15.5	11	10
11	Angelo Dolfini	Italy	16.0	10	11

=== Ladies ===
Rank	Name	Nation	TFP	SP	FS
1	Maria Butyrskaya	Russia	2.5	3	1
2	Nicole Bobek	United States	2.5	1	2
3	Vanessa Gusmeroli	France	5.0	4	3
4	Elena Liashenko	Ukraine	5.0	2	4
5	Laëtitia Hubert	France	7.5	5	5
6	Diána Póth	Hungary	9.0	6	6
7	Mojca Kopač	Slovenia	11.0	8	7
8	Andrea Diewald	Germany	11.5	7	8
9	Tara Ferguson	Canada	13.5	9	9

=== Pairs ===
Rank	Name	Nation	TFP	SP	FS
1	Sarah Abitbol / Stéphane Bernadis	France	1.5	1	1
2	Kyoko Ina / John Zimmerman	United States	4.0	4	2
3	Marina Eltsova / Andrei Bushkov	Russia	4.0	2	3
4	Kristy Sargeant / Kris Wirtz	Canada	5.5	3	4
5	Tatiana Totmianina / Maxim Marinin	Russia	7.5	5	5
6	Valerie Saurette / Jean-Sebastien Fecteau	Canada	9.0	6	6
7	Oľga Beständigová / Jozef Beständig	Slovakia	10.5	7	7

=== Ice dancing ===
Rank	Name	Nation	TFP	CD	OD	FD
1	Marina Anissina / Gwendal Peizerat	France	2.0	1	1	1
2	Barbara Fusar-Poli / Maurizio Margaglio	Italy	4.0	2	2	2
3	Margarita Drobiazko / Povilas Vanagas	Lithuania	6.0	3	3	3
4	Anna Semenovich / Vladimir Fedorov	Russia	8.6	4	5	4
5	Galit Chait / Sergey Sakhnovsky	Israel	10.2	7	4	5
6	Marie France Dubreuil / Patrice Lauzon	Canada	12.6	6	7	6
7	Isabelle Delobel / Olivier Schoenfelder	France	12.6	5	6	7
8	Eliane Hugentobler / Daniel Hugentobler	Switzerland	17.4	10	9	8
9	Magali Sauri / Olivier Chapuis	France	18.0	8	8	10
10	Debbie Kogel / Oleg Fediukov	United States	18.6	9	10	9
