= 1998 Skate Canada International =

- Type: Grand Prix
- Date: November 5 – 8
- Season: 1998–99
- Location: Kamloops, British Columbia

Champions
- Men's singles: (Russia) Evgeni Plushenko
- Ladies' singles: (Ukraine) Elena Liashenko
- Pairs: (China) Shen Xue / Zhao Hongbo
- Ice dance: (Canada) Shae-Lynn Bourne / Victor Kraatz
- Previous: 1997 Skate Canada International
- Next: 1999 Skate Canada International
- Previous Grand Prix: 1998 Skate America
- Next Grand Prix: 1998 Sparkassen Cup on Ice

The 1998 Skate Canada International was the second event of six in the 1998–99 ISU Grand Prix of Figure Skating, a senior-level international invitational competition series. It was held in Kamloops, British Columbia on November 5–8. Medals were awarded in the disciplines of men's singles, ladies' singles, pair skating, and ice dancing. Skaters earned points toward qualifying for the 1998–99 Grand Prix Final.

== Results ==
=== Men ===
Rank	Name	Nation	TFP	SP	FS
1	Evgeni Plushenko	Russia	2.0	2	1
2	Elvis Stojko	Canada	2.5	1	2
3	Szabolcs Vidrai	Hungary	5.5	5	3
4	Ivan Dinev	Bulgaria	8.0	6	5
5	Takeshi Honda	Japan	8.5	9	4
6	Evgeny Pliuta	Ukraine	8.5	3	7
7	Jayson Dénommée	Canada	9.5	7	6
8	Jeff Langdon	Canada	11.0	4	9
9	Michael Hopfes	Germany	12.0	8	8
10	Markus Leminen	Finland	15.5	11	10
11	Daniel Hollander	United States	16.0	10	11

=== Ladies ===
Rank	Name	Nation	TFP	SP	FS
1	Elena Liashenko	Ukraine	2.0	2	1
2	Fumie Suguri	Japan	2.5	1	2
3	Irina Slutskaya	Russia	4.5	3	3
4	Laëtitia Hubert	France	6.5	5	4
5	Amber Corwin	United States	9.0	8	5
6	Alisa Drei	Finland	10.0	6	7
7	Diána Póth	Hungary	10.0	4	8
8	Yulia Vorobieva	Azerbaijan	10.5	9	6
9	Zuzana Paurova	Slovakia	12.5	7	9
10	Keyla Ohs	Canada	15.0	10	10
11	Zoe Jones	United Kingdom	16.5	11	11

=== Pairs ===
Rank	Name	Nation	TFP	SP	FS
1	Shen Xue / Zhao Hongbo	China	1.5	1	1
2	Maria Petrova / Alexei Tikhonov	Russia	3.5	3	2
3	Jamie Salé / David Pelletier	Canada	4.0	2	3
4	Kristy Sargeant / Kris Wirtz	Canada	6.0	4	4
5	Marie-Claude Savard-Gagnon / Luc Bradet	Canada	7.5	5	5
6	Kateřina Beránková / Otto Dlabola	Czech Republic	9.0	6	6
7	Heather Allebach / Matthew Evers	United States	10.5	7	7
8	Marsha Pouliaschenko / Andrew Seabrook	United Kingdom	12.0	8	8

=== Ice dancing ===
Rank	Name	Nation	TFP	CD	OD	FD
1	Shae-Lynn Bourne / Victor Kraatz	Canada	2.0	1	1	1
2	Margarita Drobiazko / Povilas Vanagas	Lithuania	4.0	2	2	2
3	Sylwia Nowak / Sebastian Kolasiński	Poland	6.0	3	3	3
4	Elena Grushina / Ruslan Goncharov	Ukraine	8.0	4	4	4
5	Albena Denkova / Maxim Staviyski	Bulgaria	10.0	5	5	5
6	Olga Sharutenko / Dmitri Naumkin	Russia	13.0	7	7	6
7	Isabelle Delobel / Olivier Schoenfelder	France	13.0	6	6	7
8	Debbie Koegei / Oleg Fediukov	United States	16.0	8	8	8
9	Megan Wing / Aaron Lowe	Canada	18.0	9	9	9
10	Kornélia Bárány / András Rosnik	Hungary	21.0	11	11	10
11	Charlotte Clements / Gary Shortland	United Kingdom	21.0	10	10	11
12	Nozomi Watanabe / Akiyuki Kido	Japan	24.0	12	12	12
