= 1999 Skate Canada International =

- Type: Grand Prix
- Date: November 4 – 7
- Season: 1999–2000
- Location: Saint John, New Brunswick
- Venue: Harbour Station

Champions
- Men's singles: (Russia) Alexei Yagudin
- Ladies' singles: (United States) Michelle Kwan
- Pairs: (Russia) Elena Berezhnaya / Anton Sikharulidze
- Ice dance: (Lithuania) Margarita Drobiazko / Povilas Vanagas
- Previous: 1998 Skate Canada International
- Next: 2000 Skate Canada International
- Previous Grand Prix: 1999 Skate America
- Next Grand Prix: 1999 Sparkassen Cup on Ice

The 1999 Skate Canada International was second event of six in the 1999–2000 ISU Grand Prix of Figure Skating, a senior-level international invitational competition series. It was held at the Harbour Station in Saint John, New Brunswick on November 4–7. Medals were awarded in the disciplines of men's singles, ladies' singles, pair skating, and ice dancing. Skaters earned points toward qualifying for the 1999–2000 Grand Prix Final.

== Results ==
=== Men ===
Rank	Name	Nation	TFP	SP	FS
1	Alexei Yagudin	Russia	1.5	1	1
2	Elvis Stojko	Canada	4.0	2	3
3	Takeshi Honda	Japan	4.5	5	2
4	Todd Eldredge	United States	6.0	4	4
5	Li Chenjiang	China	7.5	3	6
6	Laurent Tobel	France	8.0	6	5
7	Ben Ferreira	Canada	10.5	7	7
8	Patrick Meier	Switzerland	12.5	9	8
9	Dmitry Dmitrenko	Ukraine	13.0	8	9
10	Silvio Smalun	Germany	15.0	10	10
11	Neil Wilson	United Kingdom	16.5	11	11
12	Frédéric Dambier	France	18.0	12	12

=== Ladies ===
Rank	Name	Nation	TFP	SP	FS
1	Michelle Kwan	United States	1.5	1	1
2	Julia Soldatova	Russia	3.5	3	2
3	Jennifer Robinson	Canada	4.0	2	3
4	Amber Corwin	United States	7.5	7	4
5	Silvia Fontana	Italy	7.5	5	5
6	Júlia Sebestyén	Hungary	8.0	4	6
7	Anna Rechnio	Poland	10.0	6	7
8	Michelle Currie	Canada	12.0	8	8

=== Pairs ===
Rank	Name	Nation	TFP	SP	FS
1	Elena Berezhnaya / Anton Sikharulidze	Russia	1.5	1	1
2	Kyoko Ina / John Zimmerman	United States	4.0	4	2
3	Kristy Sargeant / Kris Wirtz	Canada	4.0	2	3
4	Pang Qing / Tong Jian	China	5.5	3	4
5	Yulia Obertas / Dmitry Palamarchuk	Ukraine	7.5	5	5
6	Valerie Saurette / Jean-Sébastien Fecteau	Canada	9.0	6	6
7	Jacinthe Larivière / Lenny Faustino	Canada	11.0	8	7
8	Tiffany Stiegler / Johnnie Stiegler	United States	11.5	7	8

=== Ice dancing ===
Rank	Name	Nation	TFP	CD	OD	FD
1	Margarita Drobiazko / Povilas Vanagas	Lithuania	2.0	1	1	1
2	Elena Grushina / Ruslan Goncharov	Ukraine	4.0	2	2	2
3	Isabelle Delobel / Olivier Schoenfelder	France	6.0	3	3	3
4	Marie-France Dubreuil / Patrice Lauzon	Canada	8.0	4	4	4
5	Megan Wing / Aaron Lowe	Canada	10.0	5	5	5
6	Debbie Koegel / Oleg Fediukov	United States	12.0	6	6	6
7	Zhang Wina / Cao Xianming	China	14.0	7	7	7
8	Kornélia Bárány / András Rosnik	Hungary	16.4	9	8	8
9	Véronique Delobel / Olivier Chapius	France	17.6	8	9	9
