= 1997 Skate Canada International =

- Type: Champions Series
- Date: November 6 – 9
- Season: 1997–98
- Location: Halifax, Nova Scotia

Champions
- Men's singles: (Canada) Elvis Stojko
- Ladies' singles: (United States) Michelle Kwan
- Pairs: (Russia) Oksana Kazakova / Artur Dmitriev
- Ice dance: (Canada) Shae-Lynn Bourne / Victor Kraatz
- Previous: 1996 Skate Canada International
- Next: 1998 Skate Canada International
- Previous Grand Prix: 1997 Nations Cup
- Next Grand Prix: 1997 Trophée Lalique

The 1997 Skate Canada International was the third event of six in the 1997–98 ISU Champions Series, a senior-level international invitational competition series. It was held in Halifax, Nova Scotia on November 6–9. Medals were awarded in the disciplines of men's singles, ladies' singles, pair skating, and ice dancing. Skaters earned points toward qualifying for the 1997–98 Champions Series Final.

== Results ==
=== Men ===
Rank	Name	Nation	TFP	SP	FS
1	Elvis Stojko	Canada	1.5	1	1
2	Ilia Kulik	Russia	3.0	2	2
3	Michael Tyllesen	Denmark	4.5	3	3
4	Yamato Tamura	Japan	7.0	4	5
5	Laurent Tobel	France	9.0	10	4
6	Cornel Gheorghe	Romania	10.0	8	6
7	Daniel Hollander	United States	10.0	6	7
8	Jeffery Langdon	Canada	10.5	5	8
9	Neil Wilson	United Kingdom	12.5	7	9
10	Ravi Walia	Canada	14.5	9	10
11	Sven Meyer	Germany	17.0	12	11
12	Markus Leminen	Finland	17.5	11	12

=== Ladies ===
Rank	Name	Nation	TFP	SP	FS
1	Michelle Kwan	United States	1.5	1	1
2	Maria Butyrskaya	Russia	3.0	2	2
3	Surya Bonaly	France	4.5	3	3
4	Szusanna Szwed	Poland	6.0	4	4
5	Nicole Bobek	United States	9.0	6	6
6	Olga Markova	Russia	9.5	5	7
7	Vanessa Gusmeroli	France	10.5	11	5
8	Julia Lautowa	Austria	12.0	8	8
9	Rena Inoue	Japan	12.5	7	9
10	Alisa Drei	Finland	14.5	9	10
11	Brandi-Lee Rousseau	Canada	17.0	12	11
12	Keyla Ohs	Canada	17.0	10	12

=== Pairs ===
Rank	Name	Nation	TFP	SP	FS
1	Oksana Kazakova / Artur Dmitriev	Russia	1.5	1	1
2	Marina Khaltourina / Andrei Krioukov	Kazakhstan	3.5	3	2
3	Sarah Abitbol / Stéphane Bernadis	France	4.0	4	2
4	Dorota Zagórska / Mariusz Siudek	Poland	6.5	5	4
5	Kristy Sargeant / Kris Wirtz	Canada	7.0	2	6
6	Michelle Menzies / Jean-Michel Bombardier	Canada	8.0	6	5
7	Shelby Lyons / Brian Wells	United States	10.5	7	7
8	Danielle McGrath / Stephen Carr	Australia	12.0	8	8
9	Samantha Marchant / Chad Hawse	Canada	13.5	9	9
10	Lesley Rogers / Michael Aldred	United Kingdom	15.0	10	10

=== Ice dancing ===
Rank	Name	Nation	TFP	CD	OD	FD
1	Shae-Lynn Bourne / Victor Kraatz	Canada	2.0	1	1	1
2	Elizabeth Punsalan / Jerod Swallow	United States	4.4	3	2	2
3	Irina Lobacheva / Ilia Averbukh	Russia	5.6	2	3	3
4	Margarita Drobiazko / Povilas Vanagas	Lithuania	8.0	4	4	4
5	Chantal Lefebvre / Michel Brunet	Canada	11.0	6	6	5
6	Elizaveta Stekolnikova / Dmitri Kazarlyga	Kazakhstan	12.0	5	5	7
7	Dominique Deniaud / Martial Jaffredo	France	13.0	7	7	6
8	Albena Denkova / Maxim Staviyski	Bulgaria	17.0	8	8	8
9	Naomi Lang / Peter Tchernyshev	United States	19.0	9	9	10
10	Nozomi Watanabe / Akiyuki Kido	Japan	20.0	11	11	9
WD	Angelika Führing / Bruno Ellinger	Austria		10	10	
