= 1998 Sparkassen Cup on Ice =

- Type: Grand Prix
- Date: November 12 – 15
- Season: 1998–99
- Location: Gelsenkirchen

Champions
- Men's singles: (Russia) Alexei Yagudin
- Ladies' singles: (Russia) Elena Sokolova
- Pairs: (Russia) Maria Petrova / Alexei Tikhonov
- Ice dance: (Russia) Anjelika Krylova / Oleg Ovsyannikov
- Previous: 1997 Nations Cup
- Next: 1999 Sparkassen Cup on Ice
- Previous GP: 1998 Skate Canada International
- Next GP: 1998 Trophée Lalique

The 1998 Sparkassen Cup on Ice was the third event of six in the 1998–99 ISU Grand Prix of Figure Skating, a senior-level international invitational competition series. It was held in Gelsenkirchen on November 12–15. Medals were awarded in the disciplines of men's singles, ladies' singles, pair skating, and ice dancing. Skaters earned points toward qualifying for the 1998–99 Grand Prix Final.

== Results ==
=== Men ===
Rank	Name	Nation	TFP	SP	FS	GPF Qualification Points
1	Alexei Yagudin	Russia	1.5	1	1	12
2	Alexander Abt	Russia	3.0	2	2	9
3	Andrejs Vlascenko	Germany	4.5	3	3	7
4	Noaki Shigematsu	Japan	7.0	6	4	5
5	Thierry Cerez	France	7.0	4	5	4
6	Jean-Francois Hebert	Canada	9.5	5	7	3
7	Sven Meyer	Germany	10.0	8	6	2
8	Robert Grzegorczyk	Poland	11.5	7	8	1
9	Patrick Schmit	Luxembourg	13.5	9	9	-
10	Jeff Langdon	Canada	15.0	10	10	-
11	Shepherd Clark	United States	16.5	11	11	-

=== Ladies ===
Rank	Name	Nation	TFP	SP	FS	GPF Qualification Points
1	Elena Sokolova	Russia	1.5	1	1	12
2	Yulia Lavrenchuk	Ukraine	3.5	3	2	9
3	Maria Butyrskaya	Russia	4.0	2	3	Non-scoring event
4	Anna Rechnio	Poland	6.0	4	4	5
5	Jennifer Robinson	Canada	8.0	6	5	4
6	Brittney McConn	United States	9.5	7	6	3
7	Hanae Yokoya	Japan	9.5	5	7	2
8	Eva-Maria Fitze	Germany	12.0	8	8	1
9	Franziska Guenther	Germany	13.5	9	9	-

=== Pairs ===
Rank	Name	Nation	TFP	SP	FS	GPF Qualification Points
1	Maria Petrova / Alexei Tikhonov	Russia	1.5	1	1	12
2	Peggy Schwarz / Mirko Mueller	Germany	3.0	2	2	9
3	Tiffany Stiegler / Johnnie Stiegler	United States	5.0	4	3	7
4	Kateřina Beránková / Otto Dlabola	Czech Republic	5.5	3	4	5
5	Valerie Saurette / Jean-Sébastien Fecteau	Canada	7.5	5	5	4
6	Mariana Kautz / Norman Jeschke	Germany	9.0	6	6	3

=== Ice dancing ===
Rank	Name	Nation	TFP	CD	OD	FD	GPF Qualification Points
1	Anjelika Krylova / Oleg Ovsyannikov	Russia	2.0	1	1	1	12
2	Shae-Lynn Bourne / Victor Kraatz	Canada	4.0	2	2	2	9
3	Kati Winkler / René Lohse	Germany	6.0	3	3	3	7
4	Elena Grushina / Ruslan Goncharov	Ukraine	8.0	4	4	4	5
5	Galit Chait / Sergey Sakhnovsky	Israel	10.4	6	5	5	4
6	Albena Denkova / Maxim Staviyski	Bulgaria	11.6	5	6	6	3
7	Olga Sharutenko / Dmitri Naumkin	Russia	14.0	7	7	7	2
8	Marie-France Dubreuil / Patrice Lauzon	Canada	16.0	8	8	8	1
9	Dominique Deniaud / Martial Jaffredo	France	19.0	9	9	10	-
10	Stephanie Rauer / Thomas Rauer	Germany	19.4	11	10	9	-
WD	Zuzana Merzova / Tomas Morbacher	Slovakia		10	11		
