= Sherry Ball =

Canadian pair skater (born 1974)

Personal information
- Born: February 15, 1974 (age 52) St. Thomas, Ontario
- Height: 5 ft 3 in (160 cm)

Figure skating career
- Country: Canada

Sherry Ball (born February 15, 1974) is a Canadian former pair skater who also competed in women's singles. With partner Kris Wirtz, she won the bronze medal at the 1992 Canadian Figure Skating Championships and competed in the Winter Olympics that year.

== Career ==
Ball began skating as a toddler. She competed in both pairs skating and women's singles.

In 1988, she and her sister moved to Montreal to train, followed by their mother the next year. That season, she competed at the Blue Swords Cup with Chris Bourne; the pair had not yet competed in Canada but won the silver medal.

Ball competed at the 1990 World Junior Championships, held in late 1989, as a pair skater with Sean Rice, where they placed 5th. After a fall on a throw jump, she tore ligaments in her knee. A few months later, she won the 1990 Canadian National Championships novice title. She said she had given up pairs because she had been frequently injured.

In 1991, however, she competed in pairs with Paul Wirtz at the Canadian Championships. The pair placed 7th in the senior competition. In singles, she won the bronze medal in the junior division.

That August, Ball won the bronze medal in singles at the Grand Prix International St. Gervais; she and Wirtz placed 4th together. The week after, she and Wirtz won the Nebelhorn Trophy.

At the 1992 Canadian Championships, Ball won the women's junior bronze medal. She then went on to unexpectedly win a bronze medal in the pairs competition with Wirtz. They were sent to the 1992 Winter Olympics, where they placed 12th. Ball noted that "We weren't even expecting to be here," as the pair had been hoping to compete at a later Olympics. They went on to compete at the 1992 World Championships, where they finished in 10th place.

In the fall of 1992, Ball and Wirtz were assigned to Skate Canada International. However, they withdrew after Wirtz injured his ankle. Just two weeks later, it was announced that the pair had split and that Wirtz would train with Kristy Sargeant; one explanation given was that at 5 ft 3 in (1.60 m), and possibly still growing at 17, Ball might have become too tall for Wirtz. Ball said, "It was more a coaching problem than between Kris and I," as their coach, Paul Wirtz (the brother of Kris) wanted to make changes that Ball disagreed with. She said the split was "not a friendly goodbye".

Ball competed in singles skating at the 1993 World Junior Championships, held in December 1992, and she finished in 13th place. In February 1993, she placed 6th at the Canadian Championships.

In October 1993, Ball competed at Skate America and placed 9th.

Ball now works as a coach. She has said she wants to provide high-level coaching for smaller communities like her hometown so that skaters do not feel the need to move away from home at a young age. In addition, she is involved in charities that provide physical education to children with disabilities.

== Personal life ==
Ball's parents were synchronized skaters who competed on the same team. Her sister, Stacey Ball, was also a competitive skater.

== Results ==
=== Pairs with Wirtz ===
International
Event	1991–92
Winter Olympics	12th
World Championships	10th
Nebelhorn Trophy	1st
National
Canadian Championships	3rd

=== Women's singles ===
International: Junior
Event	1990–91	1991–92	1992–93
World Junior Championships			13th
National
Canadian Championships	3rd J	5th	6th
J = Junior
