= Hugentobler =

Hugentobler is a surname. Notable people with the surname include:

- Daniel Hugentobler (born 1979), Swiss ice dancer
- Eliane Hugentobler (born 1981), Swiss ice dancer
