= 1999–2000 Grand Prix of Figure Skating Final =

1999–2000 Grand Prix Final
- Type: Grand Prix
- Date: January 13 – 16, 2000
- Season: 1999–2000
- Location: Lyon, France
- Venue: Palais des Sports de Gerland

Champions
- Men's singles: (Russia) Evgeni Plushenko
- Ladies' singles: (Russia) Irina Slutskaya
- Pairs: (China) Shen Xue / Zhao Hongbo
- Ice dance: (France) Marina Anissina / Gwendal Peizerat
- Previous: 1998–99 Grand Prix Final
- Next: 2000–01 Grand Prix Final
- Previous GP: 1999 NHK Trophy

The 1999–2000 Grand Prix of Figure Skating Final was held in Lyon, France, from January 13 to 16, 2000. It was the culmination of the 1999–2000 Grand Prix Series. Skaters qualified for the event by accumulating points throughout the season. The events of the series were the 1999 Skate America, the 1999 Skate Canada International, the 1999 Sparkassen Cup on Ice, the 1999 Trophée Lalique, the 1999 Cup of Russia, and the 1999 NHK Trophy. The top six skaters in the disciplines of men's singles, ladies' singles, pair skating, and ice dancing met at the final to crown the Grand Prix Final Champion.

The format of the event differed from other years. Singles and pair skaters competed in the short program and the free skating, and ice dancers competed in the original dance and the free dance. The top four finishers in each discipline were split in groups of two and then competed head-to-head in different free skating finals.

== Results ==
=== Men ===
Rank	Name	Nation	TFP	SP	FS	F1	F2
1	Evgeni Plushenko	Russia	1.5	1	1		1
2	Elvis Stojko	Canada	3.0	2	2		2
3	Timothy Goebel	United States	6.5	5	4	1	
4	Alexander Abt	Russia	5.0	4	3	2	
5	Guo Zhengxin	China	6.5	3	5		
6	Vincent Restencourt	France	9.0	6	6		
WD	Alexei Yagudin	Russia					

=== Ladies ===
Rank	Name	Nation	TFP	SP	FS	F1	F2
1	Irina Slutskaya	Russia	3.0	2	2		1
2	Michelle Kwan	United States	1.5	1	1		2
3	Maria Butyrskaya	Russia	4.5	3	3	1	
4	Julia Soldatova	Russia	7.0	6	4	2	
5	Elena Liashenko	Ukraine	7.0	4	5		
6	Viktoria Volchkova	Russia	8.5	5	6		

=== Pairs ===
Rank	Name	Nation	TFP	SP	FS	F1	F2
1	Shen Xue / Zhao Hongbo	China	1.5	1	1		1
2	Sarah Abitbol / Stéphane Bernadis	France	4.0	4	2		2
3	Elena Berezhnaya / Anton Sikharulidze	Russia	6.0	2	5	1	
4	Maria Petrova / Alexei Tikhonov	Russia	4.5	3	3	2	
5	Jamie Salé / David Pelletier	Canada	6.5	5	4		

=== Ice dancing ===
Rank	Name	Nation	TFP	OD	FD	F1	F2
1	Marina Anissina / Gwendal Peizerat	France	1.0	1	1		1
2	Barbara Fusar-Poli / Maurizio Margaglio	Italy	2.0	2	2		2
3	Margarita Drobiazko / Povilas Vanagas	Lithuania	4.0	4	4	1	
4	Irina Lobacheva / Ilia Averbukh	Russia	3.0	3	3	2	
5	Shae-Lynn Bourne / Victor Kraatz	Canada	5.0	5	5		
