= Debbie Koegel =

American ice dancer

Personal information
- Born: February 28, 1977 (age 49) Norristown, Pennsylvania, U.S.
- Height: 5 ft 6 in (1.68 m)

Figure skating career
- Country: United States
- Skating club: Ice Works FSC
- Began skating: 1988
- Retired: 2001

Debbie Koegel (born February 28, 1977) is an American former competitive ice dancer. With Oleg Fediukov, she is the 1998 Nebelhorn Trophy silver medalist and a two-time (1999–2000) U.S. national bronze medalist.

== Personal life ==
Koegel was born on February 28, 1977, in Norristown, Pennsylvania. She attended Schuylkill Grade School. She and Oleg Fediukov are married and have three sons – Anton, born on October 20, 2002; Alec, born on August 1, 2004; and Luka Sergei, born on September 23, 2008.

== Career ==
Koegel began skating at age eleven at a rink near King of Prussia, Pennsylvania. She placed 6th with Hayes-Alan Knorr at the 1993 U.S. Championships and 15th with Michael Sklutovsky at the 1996 U.S. Championships.

=== Partnership with Fediukov ===
Koegel teamed up with Fediukov in 1996. They finished sixth with him at the 1997 U.S. Championships. Koegel/Fediukov withdrew from the 1997 Karl Schäfer Memorial after the compulsory dances; a Swiss skater sliced Koegel's left biceps in a practice accident on October 16, 1997. The duo returned to the ice in December, training at the New England Figure Skating Club in Marlboro, Massachusetts. A month later, they placed sixth at the 1998 U.S. Championships.

After winning the silver medal at the 1998 Nebelhorn Trophy, Koegel/Fediukov debuted on the Grand Prix series, placing 8th at the 1998 Skate Canada International and tenth at the 1998 Trophée Lalique. They were awarded the bronze medal at the 1999 U.S. Championships. They were coached by Uschi Keszler and Robbie Kane at Ice Works FSC in Aston, Pennsylvania.

The following season, Koegel/Fediukov again received two Grand Prix invitations; they placed sixth at the 1999 Skate Canada International but had to withdraw from the 1999 Cup of Russia due to a visa problem. The duo repeated as national bronze medalists at the 2000 U.S. Championships. They withdrew from the 2001 U.S. Championships due to a knee injury that Fediukov incurred in the compulsory dance. After Koegel sustained a shoulder injury, the two decided to retire from competition.

=== Post-competitive career ===
Koegel became a real estate agent and part-time skating coach. She has coached in Pennsylvania and other locations.

== Programs ==
(with Fediukov)

Season	Short dance	Free dance
1998–99		Anatevka (from Fiddler on the Roof)

== Competitive highlights ==
GP: Grand Prix

=== With Sklutovsky ===
National
Event	1996
U.S. Championships	15th

=== With Fediukov ===
International
Event	96–97	97–98	98–99	99–00	00–01
Four Continents			5th		
GP Cup of Russia				WD	
GP NHK Trophy					7th
GP Skate Canada			8th	6th	
GP Trophée Lalique			10th		
Finlandia Trophy		4th			
Nebelhorn Trophy			2nd		
Schäfer Memorial		WD			
National
U.S. Champ.	6th	6th	3rd	3rd	WD
WD: Withdrew
