= 1997 Nations Cup =

- Type: Champions Series
- Date: October 30 – November 2
- Season: 1997–98
- Location: Gelsenkirchen

Champions
- Men's singles: (Canada) Elvis Stojko
- Ladies' singles: (Germany) Tanja Szewczenko
- Pairs: (Germany) Mandy Wötzel / Ingo Steuer
- Ice dance: (Russia) Anjelika Krylova / Oleg Ovsiannikov
- Previous: 1996 Nations Cup
- Next: 1998 Sparkassen Cup on Ice
- Previous GP: 1997 Skate America
- Next GP: 1997 Skate Canada International

The 1997 Nations Cup was the second event of six in the 1997–98 ISU Champions Series, a senior-level international invitational competition series. It was held in Gelsenkirchen on October 30 – November 2. Medals were awarded in the disciplines of men's singles, ladies' singles, pair skating, and ice dancing. Skaters earned points toward qualifying for the 1997–98 Champions Series Final.

== Results ==
=== Men ===
Rank	Name	Nation	TFP	SP	FS
1	Elvis Stojko	Canada	1.5	1	1
2	Igor Pashkevich	Azerbaijan	4.0	2	2
3	Alexander Abt	Russia	5.5	5	3
4	Philippe Candeloro	France	7.0	6	4
5	Michael Weiss	United States	7.0	4	5
6	Dmitri Dmitrenko	Ukraine	7.5	3	6
7	Andrejs Vlascenko	Germany	11.0	8	7
8	Szabolcs Vidrai	Hungary	12.5	7	9
9	Steven Cousins	United Kingdom	13.0	10	8
10	Michael Hopfes	Germany	14.5	9	10
11	Sven Meyer	Germany	16.5	11	11

=== Ladies ===
Rank	Name	Nation	TFP	SP	FS
1	Tanja Szewczenko	Germany	1.5	1	1
2	Irina Slutskaya	Russia	4.5	5	2
3	Elena Liashenko	Ukraine	4.5	3	3
4	Szusanna Szwed	Poland	5.0	2	4
5	Krisztina Czakó	Hungary	7.0	4	5
6	Julia Vorobieva	Azerbaijan	9.0	6	6
7	Shizuka Arakawa	Japan	11.0	8	7
8	Eva-Maria Fitze	Germany	13.0	10	8
9	Jennifer Robinson	Canada	13.5	9	9
10	Sydne Vogel	United States	14.5	7	11
11	Laëtitia Hubert	France	15.5	11	10

=== Pairs ===
Rank	Name	Nation	TFP	SP	FS
1	Mandy Wötzel / Ingo Steuer	Germany	1.5	1	1
2	Elena Berezhnaya / Anton Sikharulidze	Russia	3.0	2	2
3	Evgenia Filonenko / Igor Marchenko	Ukraine	5.0	4	3
4	Peggy Schwarz / Mirko Müller	Germany	5.5	3	4
5	Marie-Claude Savard-Gagnon / Luc Bradet	Canada	8.0	6	5
6	Maria Petrova / Teimuraz Pulin	Russia	9.0	5	6
WD	Line Haddad / Sylvain Privé	France		7	

=== Ice dancing ===
Rank	Name	Nation	TFP	CD	OD	FD
1	Anjelika Krylova / Oleg Ovsiannikov	Russia	2.0	1	1	1
2	Marina Anissina / Gwendal Peizerat	France	4.0	2	2	2
3	Irina Romanova / Igor Yaroshenko	Ukraine	6.0	3	3	3
4	Tatiana Navka / Nikolai Morozov	Belarus	8.6	4	5	4
5	Kati Winkler / René Lohse	Germany	9.4	5	4	5
6	Diane Gerencser / Pasquale Camerlengo	Italy	12.0	6	6	6
7	Galit Chait / Sergei Sakhanovsky	Israel	14.0	7	7	7
8	Chantal Lefebvre / Michel Brunet	Canada	16.0	8	8	8
9	Eve Chalom / Mathew Gates	United States	18.0	9	9	9
10	Aya Kawai / Hiroshi Tanaka	Japan	20.6	10	11	10
11	Stephanie Rauer / Thomas Rauer	Germany	21.4	11	10	11
