= Oleg Fediukov =

American ice dancer

Personal information
- Native name: Олег Федюков
- Born: October 20, 1972 (age 54) Moscow, Russian SFSR, Soviet Union
- Height: 5 ft 11 in (1.80 m)

Figure skating career
- Country: United States
- Skating club: Ice Works FSC
- Began skating: 1977
- Retired: 2001

Oleg Fediukov (Russian: Олег Федюков; born October 20, 1972) is an American former competitive ice dancer. With Debbie Koegel, he is the 1998 Nebelhorn Trophy silver medalist and a two-time (1999–2000) U.S. national bronze medalist.

== Personal life ==
Fediukov was born on October 20, 1972, in Moscow. He moved to the United States on September 2, 1992. He became a U.S. citizen on January 19, 2000. He and Debbie Koegel are married and have three sons – Anton, born on October 20, 2002; Alec, born c. 2004; and Luka Sergei, born on September 23, 2008.

== Career ==
=== Early career ===
Competing with Ekaterina Proskurina for the Soviet Union, Fediukov won the silver medal at the 1991 Grand Prix International St. Gervais. After moving to the United States, he skated one season with Julieanna Sacchetti, with whom he won the novice bronze medal at the 1993 U.S. Championships. He then competed for three seasons with Laura Gayton. Gayton/Fediukov won the 1994 U.S. national junior title and moved up to the senior level the following season. They placed eighth at the 1996 U.S. Championships.

=== Partnership with Koegel ===
Fediukov teamed up with Debbie Koegel in 1996. They finished sixth at the 1997 U.S. Championships. Koegel/Fediukov withdrew from the 1997 Karl Schäfer Memorial after the compulsory dances; a Swiss skater sliced Koegel's left biceps in a practice accident on October 16, 1997. The duo returned to the ice in December, training at the New England Figure Skating Club in Marlboro, Massachusetts. A month later, they placed sixth at the 1998 U.S. Championships.

After winning the silver medal at the 1998 Nebelhorn Trophy, Koegel/Fediukov debuted on the Grand Prix series, placing 8th at the 1998 Skate Canada International and tenth at the 1998 Trophée Lalique. They were awarded the bronze medal at the 1999 U.S. Championships. They were coached by Uschi Keszler and Robbie Kane at Ice Works FSC in Aston, Pennsylvania.

The following season, Koegel/Fediukov again received two Grand Prix invitations; they placed sixth at the 1999 Skate Canada International but had to withdraw from the 1999 Cup of Russia due to a visa problem. The duo repeated as national bronze medalists at the 2000 U.S. Championships. They withdrew from the 2001 U.S. Championships due to a knee injury that Fediukov incurred in the compulsory dance. After Koegel sustained a shoulder injury, the two decided to retire from competition.

== Programs ==
(with Koegel)

Season	Short dance	Free dance
1998–99		Anatevka (from Fiddler on the Roof)

== Competitive highlights ==
GP: Grand Prix

=== With Proskurina for the Soviet Union ===
International
Event	1991–92
International St. Gervais	2nd

=== For the United States ===
==== With Sacchetti ====
National
Event	1993
U.S. Championships	3rd N.
N. = Novice level

==== With Gayton ====
National
Event	1994	1995	1996
U.S. Championships	1st J.	10th	8th
J. = Junior level

==== With Koegel ====
International
Event	96–97	97–98	98–99	99–00	00–01
Four Continents			5th		
GP Cup of Russia				WD	
GP NHK Trophy					7th
GP Skate Canada			8th	6th	
GP Trophée Lalique			10th		
Finlandia Trophy		4th			
Nebelhorn Trophy			2nd		
Schäfer Memorial		WD			
National
U.S. Champ.	6th	6th	3rd	3rd	WD
WD: Withdrew
