= Christel Borghi =

Swiss figure skater

Personal information
- Full name: Christel Borghi

Figure skating career
- Country: Switzerland
- Discipline: Women's singles

Medal record
Swiss Championships
Gold medal – first place	1999 Lausanne	Singles
Bronze medal – third place	1998 Schaffhausen	Singles

Christel Borghi is a Swiss figure skater. She is the 1999 Swiss national champion. She placed 25th at the 1999 European Figure Skating Championships.

Borghi is an ISU Technical Specialist for Switzerland Among the competitions for which she has served as technical specialist are the 2008 ISU JGP Madrid Cup.

== Results ==
Event	1998	1999
European Championships		25th
Swiss Championships	3rd	1st
