= 1998 Swiss Figure Skating Championships =

Figure skating competition

The Swiss Figure Skating Championships (officially named German: Schweizermeisterschaften Elite Kunstlaufen und Eistanzen and French: Championnats Suisses Elite Patinage Artistique et Danse sur Glace) were held in Schaffhausen from December 19-20, 1997. Medals were awarded in several disciplines including men's singles, ladies' singles, and ice dancing.

== Senior results ==
=== Men ===
| Rank | Name | TFP | SP | FS |
|---|---|---|---|---|
| 1 | Patrick Meier | 1.5 | 1 | 1 |
| 2 | Oscar Peter | 3.0 | 2 | 2 |
| 3 | Nicolas Binz | 4.5 | 3 | 3 |

=== Ladies ===
| Rank | Name | TFP | SP | FS |
|---|---|---|---|---|
| 1 | Anina Fivian | 2.0 | 2 | 1 |
| 2 | Lucinda Ruh | 2.5 | 1 | 2 |
| 3 | Christel Borghi | 4.5 | 3 | 3 |
| 4 | Melania Albea | 6.5 | 5 | 4 |
| 5 | Berrak Destanli | 7.0 | 4 | 5 |
| 6 | Janine Bur | 9.0 | 6 | 6 |
| 7 | Nicole Skoda | 10.5 | 7 | 7 |
| 8 | Martine Adank | 12.0 | 8 | 8 |
| 9 | Sylvia Moor | 15.5 | 13 | 9 |
| 10 | Anita Odermatt | 16.0 | 12 | 10 |
| 11 | Simone Walthard | 16.0 | 10 | 11 |
| 12 | Nicole Burkhard | 16.5 | 9 | 12 |
| 13 | Vania Spescha | 18.5 | 11 | 13 |
| 14 | Claudia Zimmermann | 21.5 | 15 | 14 |

=== Ice dancing ===
| Rank | Name | TFP | CD1 | CD2 | OD | FD |
|---|---|---|---|---|---|---|
| 1 | Eliane Hugentobler / Daniel Hugentobler | 2.0 | 1 | 1 | 1 | 1 |
