= Uschi Keszler's Pennies-in-Action Cancer Research Fund =

US nonprofit organization

Uschi Keszler's Pennies in Action Cancer Research Fund, is a 501(c)(3) non-profit foundation that supports research for breast cancer curative programs, including preventative vaccines and other biological therapies that do not damage the immune system.

== History ==
In 2008, Olympic figure skater and breast cancer survivor, Uschi Keszler, founded Pennies in Action. The Pennies in Action fund supports vaccine treatment of cancer instead of chemotherapy. It has consequently targeted as its initial project the breast cancer vaccine research of surgeon and researcher in endocrinology and oncology Brian Czerniecki, M.D., Ph.D. on the staff of the Abramson Cancer Center of the Hospital of the University of Pennsylvania. Czerniecki has had success in clinical trials and a history of gaining patents on inventions that increase antigens against cancer.

== Research ==
Czerniecki’s research, supported in part by American Cancer Society and National Institute of Health grants, has shown the safety and efficacy of delivering mature, peptide-pulsed dendritic cell vaccines in a variety of ways. His research also has discovered alternate sentinel lymph node mapping possibilities and opportunities to avoid axillary dissection. He has discovered that immunohistochemical analysis improves the sensitivity of this procedure. Currently the Rena Rowan Breast Center of the Abramson Cancer Center is seeking eligible patients to continue clinical trials of Czerneicki’s alternative approach which focuses on the body's immune system and uses the patient’s own cells to develop a vaccine that will attack the cancer cells to prevent the development of invasive breast cancer.
