= Paul Wirtz =

Canadian figure skating coach

Paul Wirtz (May 3, 1958 - April 6, 2006) was a Canadian figure skating coach. Originally from Marathon, Ontario, he was the brother of Kris Wirtz and the uncle of Sean Wirtz.

A coach of pairs skaters, athletes he worked with included Valérie Marcoux, Craig Buntin, Nicholas Young, Elizabeth Putnam, Sean Wirtz, Kristy Sargeant, Kris Wirtz, Dylan Moscovitch, Tanith Belbin and Eric Radford.

He died on April 6, 2006, at age 47 from non-Hodgkin's lymphoma. At the 2014 Winter Olympics in Sochi, Russia and the 2014 World Championships, Radford and Meagan Duhamel performed to a piece of music "Tribute" that Radford had personally composed as a tribute to Wirtz.

Wirtz was openly gay. When Radford came out as gay in 2014, he credited Wirtz as an important influence on his acceptance of his own sexuality: "Paul was the first gay person I ever saw in real life. The gay people on TV were always very flamboyant, and until I met Paul I didn't realize you could be gay and just be normal. He was the first person I saw who was like that, gay and just normal. He made me realize I didn't have to be afraid of it."
