= Sven Meyer (figure skater) =

German figure skater

Personal information
- Born: 15 July 1977 East Berlin, East Germany
- Died: 6 May 1999 (aged 21) Berlin, Germany
- Height: 1.78 m (5 ft 10 in)

Figure skating career
- Country: Germany
- Coach: Viola Striegler; Heinz Linder
- Skating club: Berliner TSC
- Began skating: 1982

Sven Meyer (15 July 1977 – 6 May 1999) was a German figure skater. He was the 1998 Karl Schäfer Memorial bronze medalist and 1998 German national champion.

== Career ==
Meyer began skating at age four. During his career, he trained in Berlin and represented Berliner TSC. Viola Striegler coached him for over ten years.

Meyer began the 1997–98 season with a 12th-place result at the Karl Schäfer Memorial, an Olympic qualifying event held in October 1997. He then appeared at two Champions Series (Grand Prix) assignments, placing 11th both at the 1997 Nations Cup and 1997 Skate Canada International. After winning gold at the German Championships, ahead of Andrejs Vlascenko, he was sent to two ISU Championships, reaching the free skate at both events. He finished 19th at the 1998 Europeans in Milan, after placing 18th in both segments, and 23rd at the 1998 Worlds in Minneapolis after placing 10th in his qualifying group, 24th in the short program, and 22nd in the free skate.

Competing in the 1998–99 Grand Prix series, Meyer finished 7th at the 1998 Sparkassen Cup on Ice and 8th at the 1998 Trophée Lalique. He won bronze at the 1998 Karl Schäfer Memorial and placed fifth at the 1999 German Championships.

== Personal life ==
Meyer was born on 15 July 1977 in Berlin.

He trained as a police officer as a member of the Berlin Police Sports Group.

He became engaged to German figure skater Mariana Kautz in Oberstdorf on 13 April 1999, the three-year anniversary of their relationship.

On 6 May 1999, Meyer was found dead in his apartment in Prenzlauer Berg, having shot himself with his service weapon.

== Programs ==
Season	Short program	Free skating
1998–1999		Das Boot by Klaus Doldinger

== Competitive highlights ==
International
Event	92–93	93–94	94–95	95–96	96–97	97–98	98–99
Worlds						23rd	
Europeans						19th	
GP Lalique							8th
GP Skate Canada						11th	
GP Nations Cup /Sparkassen						11th	7th
Schäfer Memorial					8th	12th	3rd
Nebelhorn Trophy		29th	15th				
International: Junior
Blue Swords		16th J.	6th J.	14th J.	13th J.		
Grand Prize SNP		7th J.					
National
German Champ.	9th J.	13th	12th	7th	7th	1st	5th
