= 1999 Swiss Figure Skating Championships =

Figure skating competition

The 1999 Swiss Figure Skating Championships (German: Schweizermeisterschaften Elite Kunstlaufen und Eistanzen and French: Championnats Suisses Elite Patinage Artistique et Danse sur Glace) were held in Lausanne from January 8 through 10th, 1999. Medals were awarded in the disciplines of men's singles, ladies' singles, and ice dancing.

== Senior results ==
=== Men ===
Rank	Name	TFP	SP	FS
1	Patrick Meier	1.5	1	1
2	Oscar Peter	3.0	2	2

=== Ladies ===
Rank	Name	TFP	SP	FS
1	Christel Borghi	3.0	2	2
2	Sarah Meier	3.5	5	1
3	Anina Fivian	4.5	1	4
4	Lucinda Ruh	5.0	4	3
5	Berrak Destanli	7.5	3	6
6	Melania Albea	9.0	8	5
7	Martine Adank	10.5	7	7
8	Nicole Skoda	12.0	6	9
9	Simone Walthard	13.0	10	8
10	Rebekka Rindisbacher	14.5	9	10
11	Sylvia Moor	17.0	12	11
12	Nicole Burkhard	17.5	11	12

=== Ice dancing ===
Rank	Name	TFP	CD1	CD2	OD	FD
1	Eliane Hugentobler / Daniel Hugentobler	2.0	1	1	1	1
