= Véronique Delobel =

French ice dancer

Personal information
- Born: 17 June 1978 (age 48) Clermont-Ferrand, Puy-de-Dôme, France

Figure skating career
- Country: France

Véronique Delobel (born 17 June 1978) is a French former competitive ice dancer. With Olivier Chapuis, she is the 2000 Ondrej Nepela Memorial champion and competed on the senior Grand Prix series. She later competed briefly with Michael Zenezini.

She is the twin sister of Isabelle Delobel.

== Results ==
=== With Zenezini ===
Event	2002
French Championships	4th

=== With Chapuis ===
International
Event	1999–2000	2000–2001
GP Skate America		8th
GP Skate Canada	9th	
Golden Spin of Zagreb		5th
Karl Schäfer Memorial	4th	
Ondrej Nepela Memorial		1st
Winter Universiade		8th
National
French Championships	4th	6th
GP = Grand Prix

=== With Marcel Taberlet ===
International
Event	1996–1997
Blue Swords	6th J.
Trophy of the Polish FSA	4th J.
J. = Junior level
