= Magali Sauri =

French ice dancer

Personal information
- Born: 26 September 1977 (age 48) Montpellier, France
- Height: 1.68 m (5 ft 6 in)

Figure skating career
- Country: France
- Began skating: 1981
- Retired: 2002

Magali Sauri (born 26 September 1977) is a French former ice dancer. With Nicolas Salicis, she placed fifth at the 1997 World Junior Championships. After their partnership ended, she competed for two seasons with Olivier Chapuis. In 1999, Sauri teamed up with Russia's Michail Stifunin. Representing France, they skated together for three seasons and won the silver medal at the 2000 Nebelhorn Trophy. Sauri/Stifunin were coached by Lydie Bontemps in Lyon.

== Programs ==
(with Stifunin)

Season	Original dance	Free dance
2001–02	Concierto de Aranjuez by Joaquín Rodrigo; La cumparsita by Gerardo Matos Rodríguez	Moulin Rouge!; Diamonds Are a Girl's Best Friend performed by Marilyn Monroe; Moulin Rouge!
2000–01	Foxtrot: The Best of Ballroom; Quickstep: The Best of Ballroom	Notre-Dame de Paris by Riccardo Cocciante, Luc Plamondon; Tu vas me détruire; Les sans-papiers; Sleepy Hollow by the Siegel–Schwall Band

== Results ==
GP: Grand Prix

=== With Stifunin ===
International
Event	1999–00	2000–01	2001–02
World Champ.		18th	
GP Cup of Russia			6th
GP Skate America			7th
GP Sparkassen Cup		7th	
Golden Spin	5th		
Nebelhorn Trophy		2nd	
National
French Champ.	5th	4th	

=== With Chapuis ===
International
Event	1997–98	1998–99
GP Trophée Lalique		9th
Basler Cup	3rd	
Czech Skate	2nd	
National
French Championships	5th	6th

=== With Salicis ===
International
Event	1993–94	1994–95	1995–96	1996–97
World Junior Champ.			6th	5th
Autumn Trophy				3rd J
Blue Swords	3rd J			
PFSA Trophy		1st J		
J: Junior level
