= Isabelle Delobel =

French ice dancer (born 1978)

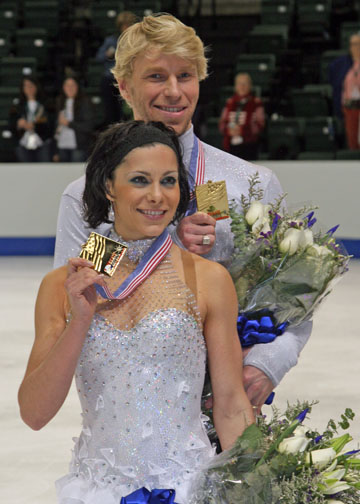
- Delobel and Schoenfelder at the 2008 Skate America.

Personal information
- Born: 17 June 1978 (age 48)
- Height: 1.63 m (5 ft 4 in)

Figure skating career
- Country: France
- Partner: Olivier Schoenfelder
- Skating club: CSG Lyon
- Began skating: 1984
- Retired: February 2010
| Event | Gold medal – first place | Silver medal – second place | Bronze medal – third place |
| World Championships | 1 | 0 | 0 |
| European Championships | 1 | 1 | 1 |
| Grand Prix Final | 1 | 0 | 1 |
| French Championships | 6 | 2 | 1 |
| World Junior Championships | 0 | 1 | 0 |
Medal list
World Championships
| Gold medal – first place | 2008 Gothenburg | Ice dance |
European Championships
| Gold medal – first place | 2007 Warsaw | Ice dance |
| Silver medal – second place | 2008 Zagreb | Ice dance |
| Bronze medal – third place | 2005 Turin | Ice dance |
Grand Prix Final
| Gold medal – first place | 2008–09 Goyang | Ice dance |
| Bronze medal – third place | 2007–08 Turin | Ice dance |
French Championships
| Gold medal – first place | 2003 Asnières | Ice dance |
| Gold medal – first place | 2004 Briançon | Ice dance |
| Gold medal – first place | 2005 Rennes | Ice dance |
| Gold medal – first place | 2006 Besançon | Ice dance |
| Gold medal – first place | 2007 Orléans | Ice dance |
| Gold medal – first place | 2008 Megève | Ice dance |
| Silver medal – second place | 2000 Courchevel | Ice dance |
| Silver medal – second place | 2001 Briançon | Ice dance |
| Bronze medal – third place | 1999 Lyon | Ice dance |
World Junior Championships
| Silver medal – second place | 1996 Brisbane | Ice dance |

Isabelle Delobel (born 17 June 1978) is a French former competitive ice dancer. With partner Olivier Schoenfelder, she is the 2008 World champion, the 2007 European champion, and the 2008 Grand Prix Final champion.

Delobel and Schoenfelder retired from competitive skating following the 2010 Winter Olympics, having skated together for two decades.

== Career ==
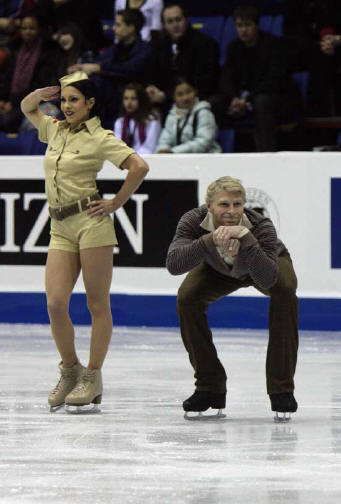
Isabelle Delobel and Olivier Schoenfelder at the 2008–09 Grand Prix Final

Delobel was born on 17 June 1978 in Clermont-Ferrand. She began skating at age six and began ice dancing after only a year in singles. She skated with her brother, Laurent, for three years. She later moved to train in Lyon.

Delobel and Schoenfelder were paired together in 1990 by coach Lydie Bontemps on the suggestion of Irina Moiseeva and Andrei Minenkov. They won a silver medal at 1996 Junior Worlds before turning senior prior to the 1996–97 season. They won their first Grand Prix medal at the 1999 Skate Canada. Early in their career, they were coached by Muriel Boucher-Zazoui in Lyon, France. Tatiana Tarasova and Nikolai Morozov were their choreographers from 1998 to 2002 and their coaches from 2000 to 2002 in Newington, Connecticut. While practising a lift at French Nationals in December 2001, Delobel tore an abdominal muscle, keeping her off the ice for six weeks and forcing the team to miss the European Championships. Feeling more comfortable in France, Delobel and Schoenfelder decided to return to Lyon and Boucher-Zazoui after the 2001–2002 season.

They won their first national championship in the 2002–2003 season. Delobel and Schoenfelder worked with choreographer Pasquale Camerlengo for the 2005–2006 season.

Delobel and Schoenfelder often finished just outside the medals at major events, including a 4th place at the 2006 Olympics, less than two points behind the bronze medalists. The following season, they won their only European title but were unable to win a medal at Worlds.

Delobel and Schoenfelder did not repeat as European champions the following year, finishing second. They then went on to win the 2008 World Championships. They were first in both the compulsory and original dance portions of the event, and second in the free dance. They considered retiring but decided to continue competing.

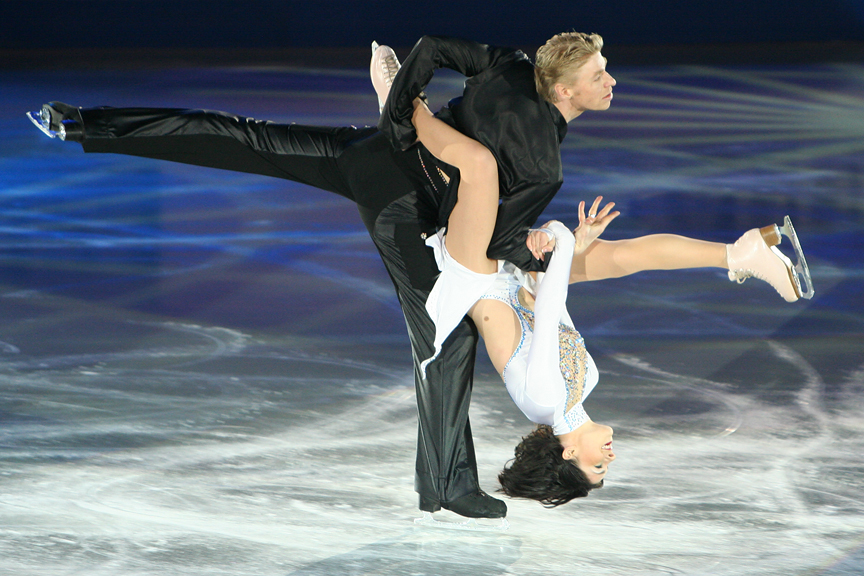
Delobel and Schoenfelder perform a lift during exhibitions at the 2007 European Championships.

They began the 2008–09 season with wins in all three Grand Prix appearances – Skate America, Trophée Eric Bompard, and the Grand Prix Final. During their gala exhibition performance at the Grand Prix Final in December 2009, Delobel suffered a shoulder injury and underwent surgery on 5 January 2009, causing them to miss the remainder of the season.

Delobel became pregnant during the injury layoff. She and Schoenfelder trained cautiously, with Marie-France Dubreuil substituting for Delobel in lifts. Dubreuil, along with Patrice Lauzon, also choreographed their final free dance. Occasional falls caused Delobel to leave the ice in late July.

Delobel's son was born in October and she returned to the ice toward the end of the month, beginning three-a-day sessions and intense physical training in November. They also skipped French Nationals and the European Championships in order to spend more time on training. The two returned in time for the Vancouver Olympics, competing just four-and-a-half months after she had given birth and announcing it would be their final competition. They finished sixth and retired from competitive skating. They continue to skate together in shows.

== Personal life ==
Delobel's twin sister, Véronique Delobel, also competed in the French national championships and internationally.

Delobel married Ludovic Roux, a bronze medalist at the 1998 Olympics in team Nordic combined, in June 2009, and their son, Loïc, was born on 2 October 2009.

== Programs ==
(with Schoenfelder)

| Season | Original dance | Free dance | Exhibition |
|---|---|---|---|
| 2010–2012 | | | Gladiator by Hans Zimmer; The Great Gig in the Sky by Pink Floyd; Uninvited by Alanis Morissette; My Immortal by Evanescence |
| 2009–2010 | French waltz: La Complainte de la Butte; French cancan: Gaîté Parisienne by Jacques Offenbach | La quête by Jacques Brel and Karl Hugo choreo. by Marie-France Dubreuil, Patrice Lauzon, and O. Biollet | |
| 2008–2009 | Boogie Woogie Bugle Boy by The Andrews Sisters choreo. by Frederic Veron | The Great Gig in the Sky by Pink Floyd choreo. by Marie-France Dubreuil, Patrice Lauzon | My Immortal by Evanescence |
| 2007–2008 | Breton Gavotte:Replique by Djal | The Piano by Michael Nyman | Turn Around by Bonnie Tyler; Come What May by Ewan McGregor, Nicole Kidman; Pour aller plus haut by Tina Arena |
| 2006–2007 | Tango Volver by Maxime Rodriguez | The Untouchables (film) by Ennio Morricone arranged by Maxime Rodriguez | Diego, libre dans sa tête by Johnny Hallyday |
| 2005–2006 | Mambo: Para Pongo by Pérez Prado; Rhumba: Havana; Mambo: Para Pongo by Pérez Prado choreo. by Pasquale Camerlengo | Le Vol de la Colombe (from Carnival in Venice) by Jacques Azaleig choreo. by Pasquale Camerlengo | Diego, libre dans sa tête by Johnny Hallyday |
| 2004–2005 | Charleston: Yes Sir, That's My Baby; Slow foxtrot: C'est si bon; Charleston: Yes Sir, That's My Baby choreo. by Pasquale Camerlengo | Frida by Elliot Goldenthal choreo. by Pasquale Camerlengo | Gladiator by Hans Zimmer |
| 2003–2004 | Love Bug by Hugh Grant; Cry me a river by Justin Timberlake; Love Bug by Hugh Grant choreo. by Pasquale Camerlengo | Merlin by Maxime Rodriguez choreo. by Romain Haguenauer | Le Magicien by Maxime Rodriguez choreo. by Isabelle Delobel, Olivier Schoenfelder; Eternita by Emma Shapplin choreo. by Isabelle Delobel, Olivier Schoenfelder; Tango choreo. by Isabelle Delobel, Olivier Schoenfelder |
| 2002–2003 | Waltz: Tausend und eine Nacht by Johann Strauss II; Polka choreo. by Pasquale Camerlengo | Mythodea by Vangelis choreo. by Margarita Drobiazko, Povilas Vanagas | Le Magicien by Maxime Rodriguez choreo. by Isabelle Delobel, Olivier Schoenfelder; Eternita by Emma Shapplin choreo. by Isabelle Delobel, Olivier Schoenfelder; Vole by Celine Dion choreo. by Isabelle Delobel, Olivier Schoenfelder |
| 2001–2002 | Flamenco; Paso doble; Flamenco choreo. by Nikolai Morozov, Tatiana Tarasova | Vivre pour le meilleur by Johnny Hallyday choreo. by Nikolai Morozov, Tatiana Tarasova; Songs from the Victorious City by Anne Dudley, Jaz Coleman choreo. by Nikolai Morozov, Tatiana Tarasova | Vivre pour le meilleur by Johnny Hallyday choreo. by Nikolai Morozov, Tatiana Tarasova |
| 2000–2001 | Unforgettable by Nat King Cole; Jumpin' Jack by Big Bad Voodoo Daddy choreo. by Isabelle Delobel, Pasquale Camerlengo | Vivre pour le meilleur by Johnny Hallyday choreo. by Nikolai Morozov, Tatiana Tarasova | The Fifth Element by Éric Serra choreo. by Isabelle Delobel, Pasquale Camerlengo; Vivre pour le meilleur by Johnny Hallyday choreo. by Nikolai Morozov, Tatiana Tarasova |
| 1999–2000 | Love Potion #9 by Hansel Martinez; My All by Mariah Carey; De Donde say choreo. by Patrick Ribas | Avant et Après la pluie; Quinquette; Steppe by René Aubry choreo. by Nikolai Morozov, Tatiana Tarasova | The Fifth Element by Éric Serra choreo. by Isabelle Delobel, Pasquale Camerlengo; Vedi, Maria by Emma Shapplin |
| 1998–1999 | Nocturne by Sodane choreo. by Patrick Ribas | Night on Bald Mountain by Modest Mussorgsky; Adagio by Yanni choreo. by Isabelle Delobel, Olivier Schoenfelder, and Christelle Morelet | |
| 1997–1998 | Blue Suede Shoes by Elvis Presley choreo. by Patrick Ribas | James Bond choreo. by Ecole Rosella Hightowes | |
| 1996–1997 | Tango choreo. by Tatiana Tarasova | West Side Story by Leonard Bernstein choreo. by Tatiana Tarasova | |
| 1995–1996 | | | |
| 1994–1995 | | Quiero Saber; Amor Amor | |

== Competitive highlights ==
(with Schoenfelder)

Results
International
| Event | 1994–95 | 1995–96 | 1996–97 | 1997–98 | 1998–99 | 1999–00 | 2000–01 | 2001–02 | 2002–03 | 2003–04 | 2004–05 | 2005–06 | 2006–07 | 2007–08 | 2008–09 | 2009–10 |
|---|---|---|---|---|---|---|---|---|---|---|---|---|---|---|---|---|
| Olympics | | | | | | | | 16th | | | | 4th | | | | 6th |
| Worlds | | | | 18th | 14th | 11th | 13th | 12th | 9th | 6th | 4th | 5th | 4th | 1st | | |
| Europeans | | | | 15th | 12th | 9th | 10th | | 7th | 4th | 3rd | 4th | 1st | 2nd | | |
| Grand Prix Final | | | | | | | | | | 5th | 6th | 6th | 4th | 3rd | 1st | |
| GP Cup of China | | | | | | | | | | 3rd | | | | | | |
| GP Cup of Russia | | | | | | | | | | | | | 3rd | | | |
| GP Lalique/Bompard | | | 6th | 7th | 7th | 7th | 5th | 5th | 2nd | 3rd | 3rd | 2nd | 2nd | 1st | 1st | |
| GP NHK Trophy | | | | 7th | | | | | 4th | | 3rd | | | 1st | | |
| GP Skate America | | | | | | | | | | 3rd | | 2nd | | | 1st | |
| GP Skate Canada | | | | | 7th | 3rd | | 5th | | | 4th | | | | | |
| GP Sparkassen | | | | | | | 5th | | | | | | | | | |
| Bofrost Cup | | | | | | | | | | | 2nd | | | | | |
| Nebelhorn | | | 3rd | | | | | | | | | | | | | |
| Ondrej Nepela | | | | | | | | | | | | | | 1st | | |
| Lysianne Lauret | | | 4th | | | | | | | | | | | | | |
International: Junior
| Junior Worlds | 4th | 2nd | | | | | | | | | | | | | | |
| Odesa Trophy | | 2nd | | | | | | | | | | | | | | |
| Autumn Trophy | | 1st | 4th | | | | | | | | | | | | | |
| Ukraine Trophy | 2nd | | | | | | | | | | | | | | | |
| EYOF | 1st | | | | | | | | | | | | | | | |
National
| French Champ. | 3rd J. | 1st J. | 4th | 4th | 3rd | 2nd | 2nd | | 1st | 1st | 1st | 1st | 1st | 1st | | |
| Master's | | | | | | | 1st | 1st | 1st | | | | | 1st | | |
GP = Grand Prix (Champions Series 1995–1997); J. = Junior level
