= Olivier Schoenfelder =

French ice dancer

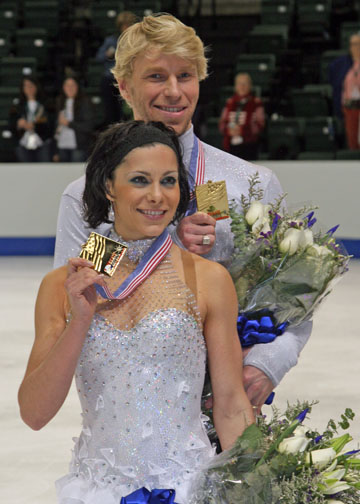
- Delobel and Schoenfelder at the 2008 Skate America.

Personal information
- Born: 30 November 1977 (age 48) Belfort, France
- Height: 1.84 m (6 ft 1/2 in)

Figure skating career
- Country: France
- Partner: Isabelle Delobel
- Skating club: CSG Lyon
- Began skating: 1984
- Retired: February 2010
Event	Gold medal – first place	Silver medal – second place	Bronze medal – third place
World Championships	1	0	0
European Championships	1	1	1
Grand Prix Final	1	0	1
French Championships	6	2	1
World Junior Championships	0	1	0
Medal list
World Championships
Gold medal – first place	2008 Gothenburg	Ice dance
European Championships
Gold medal – first place	2007 Warsaw	Ice dance
Silver medal – second place	2008 Zagreb	Ice dance
Bronze medal – third place	2005 Turin	Ice dance
Grand Prix Final
Gold medal – first place	2008–09 Goyang	Ice dance
Bronze medal – third place	2007–08 Turin	Ice dance
French Championships
Gold medal – first place	2003 Asnières	Ice dance
Gold medal – first place	2004 Briançon	Ice dance
Gold medal – first place	2005 Rennes	Ice dance
Gold medal – first place	2006 Besançon	Ice dance
Gold medal – first place	2007 Orléans	Ice dance
Gold medal – first place	2008 Megève	Ice dance
Silver medal – second place	2000 Courchevel	Ice dance
Silver medal – second place	2001 Briançon	Ice dance
Bronze medal – third place	1999 Lyon	Ice dance
World Junior Championships
Silver medal – second place	1996 Brisbane	Ice dance

Olivier Schoenfelder (born 30 November 1977) is a French retired ice dancer and coach. With partner Isabelle Delobel, he is the 2008 World champion, the 2007 European and the 2008 Grand Prix Final champion.

== Career ==
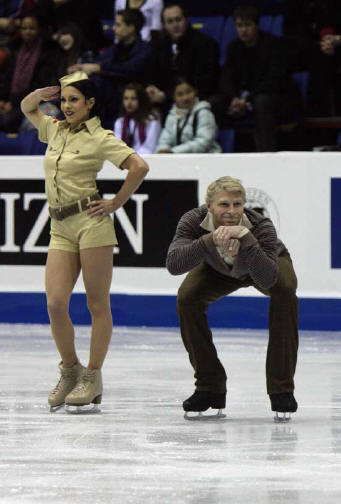
Isabelle Delobel and Olivier Schoenfelder at the 2008-09 Grand Prix Final

Schoenfelder began skating after seeing Isabelle and Paul Duchesnay at an ice show and switched to ice dancing after only six months in singles.

Delobel and Schoenfelder were paired together in 1990 by coach Lydie Bontemps on the suggestion of Irina Moiseeva and Andrei Minenkov. They won a silver medal at 1996 Junior Worlds before moving up to the senior ranks prior to the 1996–97 season. They won their first Grand Prix medal at the 1999 Skate Canada. Early in their career, they were coached by Muriel Boucher-Zazoui in Lyon, France. Tatiana Tarasova and Nikolai Morozov were their choreographers from 1998 to 2002 and their coaches from 2000 to 2002 in Newington, Connecticut. While practising a lift at French Nationals in December 2001, Delobel tore an abdominal muscle, keeping her off the ice for six weeks and forcing the team to miss the European Championships. Feeling more comfortable in France, Delobel and Schoenfelder decided to return to Lyon and Boucher-Zazoui after the 2001–2002 season.

They won their first national championship in the 2002–03 season. Delobel and Schoenfelder worked with choreographer Pasquale Camerlengo for the 2005–06 season.

Delobel and Schoenfelder often finished just off the podium at major events, including a 4th place at the 2006 Olympics, less than two points behind the bronze medalists. The following season, they won their only European title but were unable to win a medal at Worlds.

Delobel and Schoenfelder did not repeat as European champions the following year, finishing second. They then went on to win the 2008 World Championships. They were first in both the compulsory and original dance portions of the event, and second in the free dance. They considered retiring but decided to continue competing.

They began the 2008–09 season with wins in all three Grand Prix appearances – Skate America, Trophée Eric Bompard, and the Grand Prix Final. During their gala exhibition performance at the Grand Prix Final in December 2009, Delobel suffered a shoulder injury and underwent surgery on 5 January 2009, causing them to miss the remainder of the season.

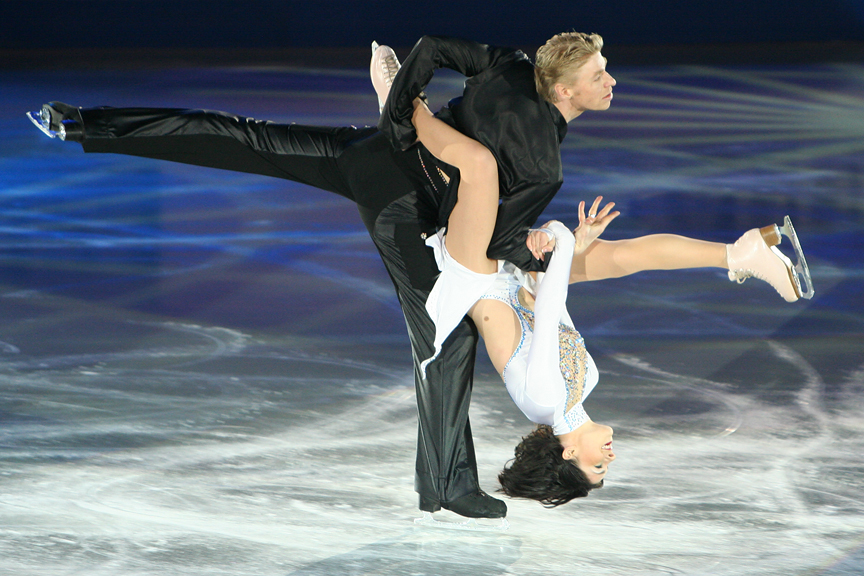
Delobel and Schoenfelder perform a lift during exhibitions at the 2007 European Championships.

Delobel became pregnant during the injury layoff. She and Schoenfelder trained cautiously, with Marie-France Dubreuil substituting for Delobel in lifts. Dubreuil, along with Patrice Lauzon, also choreographed their final free dance. Occasional falls caused Delobel to leave the ice in late July.

Delobel's son was born in October and she returned to the ice toward the end of the month, beginning three-a-day sessions and intense physical training in November. They also skipped French Nationals and the European Championships in order to spend more time on training. The two returned in time for the Vancouver Olympics, competing just four-and-a-half months after she had given birth and announcing it would be their final competition. They finished sixth and retired from competitive skating. They continue to skate together in shows.

Schoenfelder now coaches in Lyon. Among others, he coaches Lucie Myslivečková / Neil Brown and Louise Walden / Owen Edwards.

== Personal life ==
Schoenfelder studied ballet before taking up skating, as his mother is a ballet instructor. Schoenfelder studied journalism and has done some television commentating.

In May 2005, he married Isabelle Pécheur. They have a son together, Gabriel, born on 26 October 2006.

== Programs ==
(with Delobel)

Season	Original dance	Free dance	Exhibition
2010–2012			Gladiator by Hans Zimmer; The Great Gig in the Sky by Pink Floyd; Uninvited by Alanis Morissette; My Immortal by Evanescence
2009–2010	French waltz: La Complainte de la Butte; French cancan: Gaîté Parisienne by Jacques Offenbach	La quête by Jacques Brel and Karl Hugo choreo. by Marie-France Dubreuil, Patrice Lauzon, and O. Biollet	
2008–2009	Boogie Woogie Bugle Boy by The Andrews Sisters choreo. by Frederic Veron	The Great Gig in the Sky by Pink Floyd choreo. by Marie-France Dubreuil, Patrice Lauzon	My Immortal by Evanescence
2007–2008	Breton Gavotte: Replique by Djal	The Piano by Michael Nyman	Turn Around by Bonnie Tyler; Come What May by Ewan McGregor, Nicole Kidman; Pour aller plus haut by Tina Arena
2006–2007	Tango Volver by Maxime Rodriguez	The Untouchables (film) by Ennio Morricone arranged by Maxime Rodriguez	Diego, libre dans sa tête by Johnny Hallyday
2005–2006	Mambo: Para Pongo by Pérez Prado; Rhumba: Havana; Mambo: Para Pongo by Pérez Prado choreo. by Pasquale Camerlengo	Le Vol de la Colombe (from Carnival in Venice) by Jacques Azaleig choreo. by Pasquale Camerlengo	Diego, libre dans sa tête by Johnny Hallyday
2004–2005	Charleston: Yes Sir, That's My Baby; Slow foxtrot: C'est si bon; Charleston: Yes Sir, That's My Baby choreo. by Pasquale Camerlengo	Frida by Elliot Goldenthal choreo. by Pasquale Camerlengo	Gladiator by Hans Zimmer
2003–2004	Love Bug by Hugh Grant; Cry me a river by Justin Timberlake; Love Bug by Hugh Grant choreo. by Pasquale Camerlengo	Merlin by Maxime Rodriguez choreo. by Romain Haguenauer	Le Magicien by Maxime Rodriguez choreo. by Isabelle Delobel, Olivier Schoenfelder; Eternita by Emma Shapplin choreo. by Isabelle Delobel, Olivier Schoenfelder; Tango choreo. by Isabelle Delobel, Olivier Schoenfelder
2002–2003	Waltz: Tausend und eine Nacht by Johann Strauss II; Polka choreo. by Pasquale Camerlengo	Mythodea by Vangelis choreo. by Margarita Drobiazko, Povilas Vanagas	Le Magicien by Maxime Rodriguez choreo. by Isabelle Delobel, Olivier Schoenfelder; Eternita by Emma Shapplin choreo. by Isabelle Delobel, Olivier Schoenfelder; Vole by Celine Dion choreo. by Isabelle Delobel, Olivier Schoenfelder
2001–2002	Flamenco; Paso doble; Flamenco choreo. by Nikolai Morozov, Tatiana Tarasova	Vivre pour le meilleur by Johnny Hallyday choreo. by Nikolai Morozov, Tatiana Tarasova; Songs from the Victorious City by Anne Dudley, Jaz Coleman choreo. by Nikolai Morozov, Tatiana Tarasova	Vivre pour le meilleur by Johnny Hallyday choreo. by Nikolai Morozov, Tatiana Tarasova
2000–2001	Unforgettable by Nat King Cole; Jumpin' Jack by Big Bad Voodoo Daddy choreo. by Isabelle Delobel, Pasquale Camerlengo	Vivre pour le meilleur by Johnny Hallyday choreo. by Nikolai Morozov, Tatiana Tarasova	The Fifth Element by Éric Serra choreo. by Isabelle Delobel, Pasquale Camerlengo; Vivre pour le meilleur by Johnny Hallyday choreo. by Nikolai Morozov, Tatiana Tarasova
1999–2000	Love Potion #9 by Hansel Martinez; My All by Mariah Carey; De Donde say choreo. by Patrick Ribas	Avant et Après la pluie; Quinquette; Steppe by René Aubry choreo. by Nikolai Morozov, Tatiana Tarasova	The Fifth Element by Éric Serra choreo. by Isabelle Delobel, Pasquale Camerlengo; Vedi, Maria by Emma Shapplin
1998–1999	Nocturne by Sodane choreo. by Patrick Ribas	Night on Bald Mountain by Modest Mussorgsky; Adagio by Yanni choreo. by Isabelle Delobel, Olivier Schoenfelder, and Christelle Morelet	
1997–1998	Blue Suede Shoes by Elvis Presley choreo. by Patrick Ribas	James Bond choreo. by Ecole Rosella Hightowes	
1996–1997	Tango choreo. by Tatiana Tarasova	West Side Story by Leonard Bernstein choreo. by Tatiana Tarasova	
1995–1996			
1994–1995		Quiero Saber; Amor Amor	

== Competitive highlights ==
(with Delobel)

Results
International
Event	1994–95	1995–96	1996–97	1997–98	1998–99	1999–00	2000–01	2001–02	2002–03	2003–04	2004–05	2005–06	2006–07	2007–08	2008–09	2009–10
Olympics								16th				4th				6th
Worlds				18th	14th	11th	13th	12th	9th	6th	4th	5th	4th	1st		
Europeans				15th	12th	9th	10th		7th	4th	3rd	4th	1st	2nd		
Grand Prix Final										5th	6th	6th	4th	3rd	1st	
GP Cup of China										3rd						
GP Cup of Russia													3rd			
GP Lalique/Bompard			6th	7th	7th	7th	5th	5th	2nd	3rd	3rd	2nd	2nd	1st	1st	
GP NHK Trophy				7th					4th		3rd			1st		
GP Skate America										3rd		2nd			1st	
GP Skate Canada					7th	3rd		5th			4th					
GP Sparkassen							5th									
Bofrost Cup											2nd					
Nebelhorn			3rd													
Ondrej Nepela														1st		
Lysianne Lauret			4th													
International: Junior
Junior Worlds	4th	2nd														
Odesa Trophy		2nd														
Autumn Trophy		1st	4th													
Ukraine Trophy	2nd															
EYOF	1st															
National
French Champ.	3rd J.	1st J.	4th	4th	3rd	2nd	2nd		1st	1st	1st	1st	1st	1st		
Master's							1st	1st	1st					1st		
GP = Grand Prix (Champions Series 1995–1997); J. = Junior level
