= Andrejs Vlaščenko =

Figure skater

Personal information
- Born: 15 June 1974 (age 52) Weimar, East Germany
- Height: 1.83 m (6 ft 0 in)

Figure skating career
- Country: Germany (1994–2004); Latvia (1991–94)
- Discipline: Men's singles
- Began skating: 1980
- Retired: 2004

Medal record
Representing Latvia
Latvian Championships
Gold medal – first place	1992 Riga	Singles
Gold medal – first place	1994 Riga	Singles
Representing Germany
German Championships
Gold medal – first place	1995 Oberstdorf	Singles
Gold medal – first place	1996 Berlin	Singles
Gold medal – first place	1997 Oberstdorf	Singles
Gold medal – first place	1999 Oberstdorf	Singles
Silver medal – second place	1998 Berlin	Singles
Silver medal – second place	2001 Oberstdorf	Singles
Silver medal – second place	2002 Berlin	Singles
Silver medal – second place	2004 Berlin	Singles
Bronze medal – third place	2003 Oberstdorf	Singles

Andrejs Vlaščenko (Russian: Андрей Влащенко; born 15 June 1974) is a figure skater who represented Latvia (1992–94) and Germany (1994–2004). Competing for Germany, he won two Grand Prix medals – bronze at both the 2001 Trophee Lalique and at the 1998 Sparkassen Cup on Ice – and became a four-time German national champion. In 1998, he placed fourth at the European Championships in Milan and fifth at the World Championships in Minneapolis.

== Personal life ==
Vlaščenko was born on 15 June 1974 in Weimar, East Germany while his father was stationed there in the Soviet army. His family later returned to the Soviet Union and he grew up in Latvia. He moved to Germany in 1994.

== Career ==
=== Early career ===
Vlaščenko began skating in 1980.

The first national championships held after Latvia's independence took place in Riga in April 1992. Vlaščenko won the men's event after his only competitor, Konstantin Kostin, withdrew from the competition.

Controversy arose after the 1993 Latvian Championships when Vlaščenko, who had finished in second place, allegedly refused his silver medal and threw away his diploma. He claimed he gave the medal to his brother, while his coach threw out the diploma. Tatjana Strautmane, president of the Latvian Skating Association, annulled his second-place finish, while the full association's presidium later voted to suspend Vlaščenko for the rest of the season.

Scandal followed Vlaščenko during his tenure on the Latvian national team. When members of the team met to sign their contracts with the skating federation in June 1993, Vlaščenko failed to appear. The skating federation soon received a letter from the German Ice Skating Union asking that Vlaščenko be released to allow him to compete for Germany. In 1994, it was discovered that Vlaščenko had applied for German citizenship, having been receiving financial assistance from the German skating federation, even while still representing Latvia in international competition, including at the 1994 Winter Olympics.

At the Winter Olympics, Vlaščenko placed 21st in the short program, 20th in the free skate, and 21st overall.

His last competition for Latvia was at the 1994 World Championships; he ranked 5th in his qualifying group, 11th in the short, 10th in the free, and 11th overall.

He was coached by Anta Medne and Andžela Šurupova.

=== Move to Germany ===
Vlascenko decided to skate for Germany after moving there in 1994. He initially represented EV Füssen.

In the 1995–96 season, he began appearing in the newly created ISU Champions Series (later known as the Grand Prix series) and won his second consecutive German national title. He was sent to the 1996 European Championships in Sofia, Bulgaria, but withdrew after placing first in his qualifying group. At the 1996 World Championships in Edmonton, Alberta, Canada, he ranked fourth in his qualifying group, 11th in the short program, eighth in the free skate, and eighth overall. The following season, he finished sixth at the 1997 European Championships in Paris after placing third in the short and sixth in the free. He had the same final result at the 1997 World Championships in Lausanne after placing fourth in qualifying, 10th in the short, and 5th in the free.

In the 1997–98 season, Vlascenko finished second to Sven Meyer at the German Championships but went on to achieve his best ISU Championship results. Ranked fourth in the short and fifth in the free, he finished fourth overall at the European Championships in January 1998 in Milan, Italy. In April, he finished fifth at the 1998 World Championships in Minneapolis, USA (7th in qualifying, 6th in the short, and 5th in the free).

In November 1998, Vlascenko won his first Grand Prix medal, bronze at the Sparkassen Cup on Ice. After placing 6th at the 1998 Trophée Lalique and 4th at the 1998 NHK Trophy, he qualified for the Grand Prix Final and went on to win his fourth German national title. In January 1999, he placed fourth (second in his qualifying group, sixth in the short, and fourth in the free) at the European Championships in Prague, Czech Republic. In March, he placed sixth at the Grand Prix Final in Saint Petersburg, Russia, and then 9th at the 1999 World Championships in Helsinki, Finland.

Vlascenko was 7th at the 2000 European Championships in Vienna, Austria, and 16th at the 1999 World Championships in Nice, France. He changed coaches in the summer of 2000, leaving Surupova to join Steffie Ruttkies in Munich. He placed 6th at the 2001 European Championships in Bratislava, Slovakia.

In the 2001–02 season, Vlascenko began representing Münchner Eislaufverein and continued with Ruttkies as his coach. After winning his second Grand Prix medal, bronze at the 2001 Trophée Lalique, he finished 8th at the 2002 European Championships in Lausanne, Switzerland, and 10th at the 2002 World Championships in Nagano, Japan.

Alexander Vedenin became his coach, working with him in Munich, in the 2002–03 season. Vlascenko took bronze at the German Championships and finished 17th at the 2003 World Championships in Washington, D.C. after placing 11th in qualifying, 21st in the short, and 12th in the free. Vedenin remained his coach the following season. Vlascenko ended his career in February 2004 at the European Championships in Budapest, where he placed 7th.

== Programs ==
Season	Short program	Free skating
2003–04	Moscow Nights (Russian folk song) arranged and performed by the Scorpions	The Circus Princess by Emmerich Kálmán
2002–03	Variations on a Theme by Paganini by Sergei Rachmaninoff	The Count of Monte Cristo by Ed Shearmur
2001–02	Variations on a Theme by Paganini by Sergei Rachmaninoff	Blues in Rock by W. Sintchuk
2000–01	Tango Music by Henry Tourgue	Notre-Dame de Paris by Riccardo Cocciante

== Results ==
=== Single skating (for Latvia) ===
Competition placements at junior/senior level
Season	1991–92	1992–93	1993–94
Winter Olympics			21st
World Championships			11th
Latvian Championships	1st	2nd (Note: Andrejs Vlaščenko's second-place finish was annulled by the president of the Latvian Skating Association for unsportsmanlike conduct.)	1st
Nebelhorn Trophy		12th	
Piruetten			13th
World Junior Championships		8th J	

=== Single skating (for Germany) ===
Event	94–95	95–96	96–97	97–98	98–99	99–00	00–01	01–02	02–03	03–04
World Championships		8th	6th	5th	9th	16th		10th	17th	
European Championships		WD	6th	4th	4th	7th	6th	8th		7th
Grand Prix Final					6th					
GP Cup of China										10th
GP Cup of Russia						4th			4th	
GP Trophée Lalique					6th			3rd		
GP Nations Cup		5th	7th	7th	3rd	6th			7th	
GP NHK Trophy				7th	4th		6th			
GP Skate America		5th								4th
GP Skate Canada		10th	8th				7th			
Cup of Russia		9th								
Finlandia Trophy									1st	
Schäfer Memorial						2nd				
German Championships	1st	1st	1st	2nd	1st		2nd	2nd	3rd	2nd
