= Patrick Meier (figure skater) =

Swiss figure skater

Personal information
- Born: 15 March 1976 (age 50) Winterthur, Switzerland
- Height: 1.70 m (5 ft 7 in)

Figure skating career
- Country: Switzerland
- Coach: Christina Persico
- Skating club: Winterthurer Schlittschuh Club
- Began skating: 1982
- Retired: 2004

Medal record
Swiss Championships
| Gold medal – first place | 1992 Monthey | Singles |
| Gold medal – first place | 1994 Neuchâtel | Singles |
| Gold medal – first place | 1996 Lugano | Singles |
| Gold medal – first place | 1997 Grindelwald | Singles |
| Gold medal – first place | 1998 Schaffhausen | Singles |
| Gold medal – first place | 1999 Lausanne | Singles |
| Gold medal – first place | 2000 Lugano | Singles |
| Silver medal – second place | 2001 Geneva | Singles |
| Silver medal – second place | 2004 Neuchâtel | Singles |
| Bronze medal – third place | 2003 Zug | Singles |

Patrick Meier (born 15 March 1976 in Winterthur) is a Swiss former competitive figure skater. He is the 1995 Karl Schäfer Memorial silver medalist and a seven-time Swiss national champion.

Meier began skating at the age of six. He represented Switzerland at the European Figure Skating Championships, the World Figure Skating Championships, and the 1998 Winter Olympics, where he placed 22nd. Meier became the first Swiss skater to perform a triple Axel in competition, at the 1995 Karl Schäfer Memorial. He studied law at the University of Zürich.

== Programs ==
| Season | Short program | Free skating |
|---|---|---|
| 2003–2004 | Turtle Shoes; Another Night in Tunesia by Bobby McFerrin; So Flute by St. Germain | Pauvre Juliette; Night Run by René Aubry; Eye of the Tiger (from The Rocky Story) |
| 2001–2002 | Kudos by Trio Toykeat | To See More; Farewell; To See More by Zbigniew Preisner |
| 2000–2001 | Desafina (They challenge) by Joaquin Cortes, Gypsy Pasion Band | To See More; Farewell |

== Results ==
International
| Event | 90–91 | 91-92 | 92–93 | 93–94 | 94–95 | 95–96 | 96–97 | 97–98 | 98–99 | 99–00 | 00–01 | 01–02 | 02–03 | 03–04 |
|---|---|---|---|---|---|---|---|---|---|---|---|---|---|---|
| Olympics | | | | | | | | 22nd | | | | | | |
| Worlds | | 34th | | | | 25th | 24th | 20th | 22nd | 22nd | 16th | | | 31st |
| Europeans | | 19th | | 31st | 18th | 13th | 17th | 12th | 10th | 31st | | 24th | | 20th |
| Crystal Skate | | | | | | | | | | | | | 3rd | |
| Karl Schäfer | | | | | | 2nd | | 6th | | | | | | |
| Nebelhorn | | | | | | | | 15th | | | | | | |
| Piruetten | | | 17th | 18th | | | | | | | | | | |
National
| Swiss | 3rd | 1st | 3rd | 1st | 2nd | 1st | 1st | 1st | 1st | 1st | 2nd | | 3rd | 2nd |
