= Tausend und eine Nacht =

Waltz composed by Johann Strauss II

Tausend und eine Nacht (Thousand and One Nights), Op. 346, is a waltz composed by Johann Strauss II in 1871. The waltz's melodies were drawn from his first operetta, Indigo und die vierzig Räuber (Indigo and the Forty Thieves). It was his first attempt at ensuring that the more memorable melodies from the stage works would survive obscurity by finding new life as a new orchestral work, a practice which he would retain in future stage works. Such a move would also benefit sheet music publishers who can sell the piano editions of the new works to the public who can readily identify individual music pieces.

The waltz incorporated the more popular numbers from the operetta, with the melody "Ja, so singt man" comprising the entire first waltz section. The second section was contributed from the act 2 bacchanal "Lasst frei nun erschallen das Lied aus der Brust".

== Composition ==
Introduction.

The waltz's dreamy introduction is played by a sonorous clarinet evoking a distinctive Arabian feel. The first waltz is robust and energetic, with a trio section of comparatively less-rigorous character. The second waltz is a swirling passage in C major, in a high-spirited fashion. The third waltz is considerably gentler, with a fierce, exciting coda. The first waltz theme makes a hesitant entry again, accelerating into its breathless and brilliant conclusion, with repeated chords, with a strong drumroll and brass flourish.
