= Uschi Keszler =

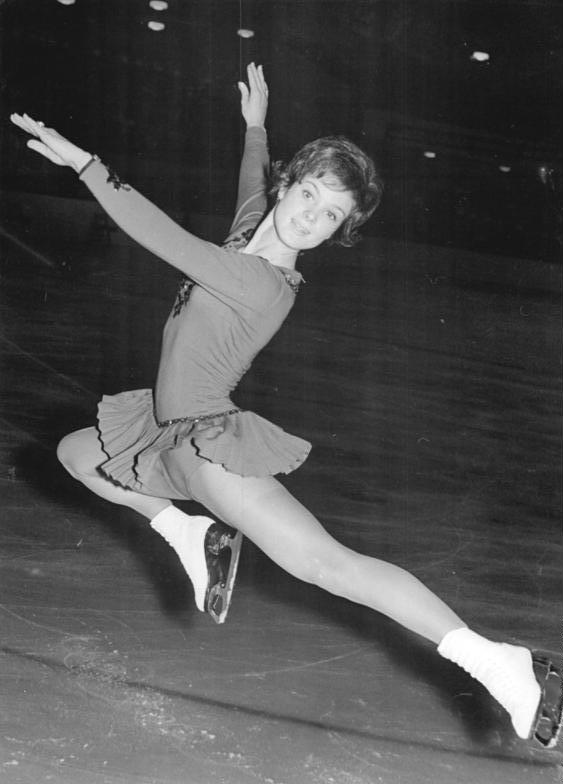
- Keszler in 1963

Personal information
- Other names: Ursula Keszler
- Born: August 13, 1948 (age 78) Mannheim, Baden-Württemberg, Germany
- Height: 1.61 m (5 ft 3 1/2 in)

Figure skating career
- Country: West Germany
- Retired: 1966

Ursula "Uschi" Keszler (born August 13, 1948) is a figure skating coach and choreographer and a former competitor for West Germany.

== Career ==
Uschi Keszler qualified to represent the United Team of Germany at the 1964 Winter Olympics in Innsbruck and finished 24th. The following season, she became the West German national champion and placed 11th at the 1965 European Championships.

In the 1965–66 season, Keszler won gold at the Richmond Trophy and the national silver medal. In January 1966, Keszler placed eighth at the European Championships and then 11th at the 1966 World Championships in late February. After the retirement of pairs skaters Marika Kilius and Hans-Jürgen Bäumler in 1964, the German Ice Skating Union was under pressure to produce more champion pairs. In April 1966, it was reported that Keszler and a fellow single skater, Ralph Borghard, had trained together to compete in pairs. Borghard had recently escaped from East Germany during the world championships in Davos. Six weeks after Borghard's escape, during which the two had practiced lifts, Keszler's parents and fiancé objected to the pairing. Ultimately, she never returned to competition.

Keszler spent eight months in hospital after contracting tuberculosis and was advised by her doctors not to return to competition. She began working as a coach and choreographer in the United States. Keszler is known primarily for her work with Canadian skaters Brian Orser, Elvis Stojko, and Shae-Lynn Bourne / Victor Kraatz. Keszler invented the term "hydroblading" to refer to skating on deep edges low to the ice, and using it as a training technique. In 1997, she became a co-owner of the Ice Works rink in Aston, Pennsylvania.

== Personal life ==
Keszler was born in Mannheim and settled in the United States. She married Aram Boornazian, with whom she has a son, Marc. A survivor of breast and uterine cancer, she founded Uschi Keszler's Pennies-in-Action Cancer Research Fund.

== Competitive highlights ==
International
Event	1962–63	1963–64	1964–65	1965–66
Winter Olympics		24th		
World Champ.		15th		11th
European Champ.			11th	8th
Richmond Trophy				1st
Prague Skate				3rd
National
West Germany	6th	2nd	1st	2nd
