= Olivier Chapuis =

French retired competitive ice dancer

- Born: 10 January 1975 (age 50)

Figure skating career
- Country: France

Olivier Chapuis (born 10 January 1975) is a French retired competitive ice dancer. With dance partner Véronique Delobel, he competed internationally for France, winning medals at the 2000 Ondrej Nepela Memorial and competing on the ISU Grand Prix of Figure Skating. Before teaming up with Delobel, he competed internationally with partners Magali Sauri and Anne Chaigneau.

== Results ==
GP: Grand Prix

=== With Delobel ===
International
Event	1999–2000	2000–2001
GP Skate America		8th
GP Skate Canada	9th	
Golden Spin of Zagreb		5th
Karl Schäfer Memorial	4th	
Ondrej Nepela Memorial		1st
Winter Universiade		8th
National
French Championships	4th	6th

=== With Sauri ===
International
Event	1997–98	1998–99
GP Trophée Lalique		9th
Basler Cup	3rd	
Josef Dedic Memorial	2nd	
National
French Championships	5th	6th

=== With Chaigneau ===
International
Event	1994–95	1995–96	1996–97
Karl Schäfer Memorial			3rd
Lysiane Lauret Challenge			9th
Ondrej Nepela Memorial		3rd	
PFSA Trophy			5th
National
French Championships	10th		7th
