= Maxime Rodriguez =

French composer

Maxime Rodriguez, born 1975 (age 49–50) in Colombes, France, is a French composer. Many of his works, such as Esperanza, Child of Nazareth, and Tango Volver, D'Artagnan, Coeur Brave, L'enfant pur, have been used for figure skating programs and rhythmic gymnastics routines.

He made compositions and musical productions for international figure skaters such as Philippe Candeloro, Sarah Abitbol / Stephane Bernadis, Stanick Jeannette, Marina Anissina / Gwendal Peizerat, Johnny Weir, Isabelle Delobel / Olivier Schoenfelder, Stephane Lambiel, Brian Joubert and many others. His first CD : "Synphonie sur Glace" Edited by EMI Music in 2000.

He also made original soundtrack for film documentaries diffused on Canal+, Sport+ and France Television. He is musical director, composer and singer in professional ice skating shows in Japan, France and Europe.
