= 1998–99 Grand Prix of Figure Skating Final =

Figure skating competition

1998–99 Grand Prix Final
- Type: Grand Prix
- Date: March 5 – 7, 1999
- Season: 1998–99
- Location: Saint Petersburg, Russia
- Venue: Sports and Concert Complex

Champions
- Men's singles: (Russia) Alexei Yagudin
- Ladies' singles: (Uzbekistan) Tatiana Malinina
- Pairs: (China) Shen Xue / Zhao Hongbo
- Ice dance: (Russia) Anjelika Krylova / Oleg Ovsyannikov
- Previous: 1997–98 Champions Series Final
- Next: 1999–2000 Grand Prix Final
- Previous GP: 1998 NHK Trophy

The 1998–99 Grand Prix of Figure Skating Final was an elite figure skating competition held in Saint Petersburg, Russia from March 5 through 7, 1999. Medals were awarded in men's singles, ladies' singles, pair skating, and ice dancing.

The Grand Prix Final was the culminating event of the ISU Grand Prix of Figure Skating series, which consisted of Skate America, Skate Canada International, Sparkassen Cup on Ice, Trophée Lalique, Cup of Russia, and NHK Trophy competitions. The top six skaters from each discipline competed in the final.

== Results ==
=== Men ===
Rank	Name	Nation	TFP	SP	FS
1	Alexei Yagudin	Russia	1.5	1	1
2	Alexei Urmanov	Russia	3.5	3	2
3	Evgeni Plushenko	Russia	4.0	2	3
4	Michael Weiss	United States	6.5	5	4
5	Alexander Abt	Russia	7.0	4	5
6	Andrejs Vlascenko	Germany	9.0	6	6

=== Ladies ===
Rank	Name	Nation	TFP	SP	FS
1	Tatiana Malinina	Uzbekistan	1.5	1	1
2	Maria Butyrskaya	Russia	3.0	2	2
3	Irina Slutskaya	Russia	4.5	3	3
4	Elena Sokolova	Russia	6.0	4	4
5	Fumie Suguri	Japan	8.0	6	5
6	Elena Liashenko	Ukraine	8.5	5	6

=== Pairs ===
Rank	Name	Nation	TFP	SP	FS
1	Shen Xue / Zhao Hongbo	China	1.5	1	1
2	Elena Berezhnaya / Anton Sikharulidze	Russia	3.0	2	2
3	Maria Petrova / Alexei Tikhonov	Russia	5.5	5	3
4	Sarah Abitbol / Stéphane Bernadis	France	5.5	3	4
5	Kyoko Ina / John Zimmerman	United States	7.0	4	5

=== Ice dancing ===
Rank	Name	Nation	TFP	CD	OD	FD
1	Anjelika Krylova / Oleg Ovsyannikov	Russia	2.0	1	1	1
2	Marina Anissina / Gwendal Peizerat	France	4.0	2	2	2
3	Irina Lobacheva / Ilia Averbukh	Russia	6.0	3	3	3
4	Margarita Drobiazko / Povilas Vanagas	Lithuania	9.0	5	5	4
5	Barbara Fusar-Poli / Maurizio Margaglio	Italy	9.0	4	4	5
