= Eliane Hugentobler =

Swiss ice dancer

Personal information
- Born: 30 September 1981 (age 45)
- Height: 1.59 m (5 ft 2 1/2 in)

Figure skating career
- Country: Switzerland
- Discipline: Ice dance
- Partner: Daniel Hugentobler
- Skating club: EC Frauenfeld

Medal record
Swiss Championships
Gold medal – first place	1998 Schaffhausen	Ice dance
Gold medal – first place	1999 Lausanne	Ice dance
Gold medal – first place	2000 Lugano	Ice dance
Gold medal – first place	2001 Geneva	Ice dance
Gold medal – first place	2002 Zurich	Ice dance

Eliane Hugentobler (born 30 September 1981 in Zürich) is a Swiss ice dancer. With brother Daniel Hugentobler, she is the 1998-2002 Swiss national champion. They competed at the 2002 Winter Olympics, where they placed 14th. The Hugentoblers were coached by Natalia Linichuk and Gennadi Karponosov.

== Programs ==
Season	Original dance	Free dance
2001–2002	Waltz by Johann Strauss; Polka by Carl Michael Ziehrer	Cats (musical) by Andrew Lloyd Webber
2000–2001	Foxtrot: C'est toi; Quickstep: Elle dit non, non, non	West Side Story by Leonard Bernstein

== Results ==
(ice dance with Daniel Hugentobler)

Results
International
Event	1993–94	1994–95	1995–96	1996–97	1997–98	1998–99	1999–00	2000–01	2001–02
Olympics									14th
Worlds					26th	18th	14th	15th	
Europeans					22nd	15th	13th	13th	9th
GP Skate Canada									5th
GP Sparkassen Cup								8th	
GP Trophée Lalique						8th	9th	6th	
Golden Spin									2nd
Karl Schäfer					13th				
Skate Israel						7th			
International: Junior
Junior Worlds		23rd	18th	10th					
EYOF				3rd J.					
National
Swiss Champ.	1st J.	1st J.	1st J.	1st J.	1st	1st	1st	1st	1st
GP = Grand Prix; J. = Junior level
