= Margarita Drobiazko =

Lithuanian ice dancer

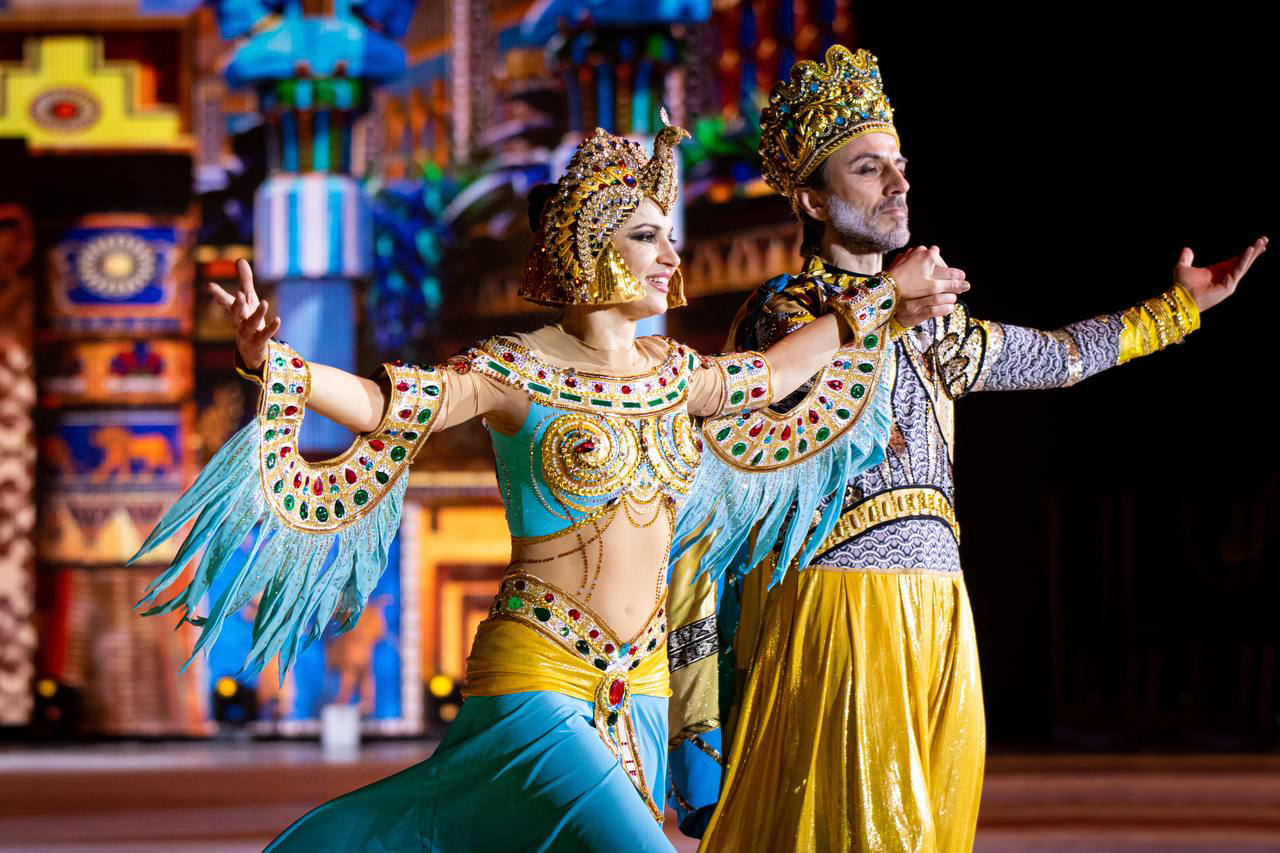
- Drobiazko and Povilas Vanagas in 2024

Personal information
- Born: 21 December 1971 (age 54) Moscow, Russian SFSR, Soviet Union
- Height: 1.70 m (5 ft 7 in)

Figure skating career
- Country: Lithuania
- Partner: Povilas Vanagas
- Skating club: Sports School Baltu Ainiai
- Began skating: 1977
- Retired: 2002, 2006
Medal record
Figure skating
Ice dancing
Representing Lithuania
World Championships
Bronze medal – third place	2000 Nice	Ice dancing
European Championships
Bronze medal – third place	2006 Lyon	Ice dancing
Bronze medal – third place	2000 Vienna	Ice dancing
Grand Prix Final
Bronze medal – third place	2001–2002 Kitchener	Ice dancing
Bronze medal – third place	2000–2001 Tokyo	Ice dancing
Bronze medal – third place	1999–2000 Lyon	Ice dancing

Margarita Aleksandrovna Drobiazko (Russian: Маргарита Александровна Дробязко; born 21 December 1971) is a Russian retired ice dancer. She began competing for Lithuania in 1992 when she teamed up with Povilas Vanagas. With Vanagas, she is the 2000 World bronze medalist, a three-time Grand Prix Final bronze medalist, a two-time European bronze medalist (2000, 2006), the 1999 Skate Canada champion, and competed in five Winter Olympics, finishing as high as 5th.

== Career ==
Drobiazko began skating at age six – she became interested after seeing children learning to skate at an outdoor rink. She convinced her mother, who wanted her to become a ballerina, to let her try skating. At age 12, she took up ice dancing and was coached first by Natalia Linichuk and then Natalia Dubova. She initially competed with Oleg Granionov for Russia.

Drobiazko was paired with Lithuanian skater Povilas Vanagas by Tatiana Tarasova in Moscow. After the breakup of the Soviet Union, they decided to represent Lithuania. Vanagas said, "It was difficult at the beginning because there was a lot of friction between Russia and Lithuania. Since Rita is Russian, it caused many problems." They moved to Kaunas, Lithuania and began training with Elena Maslennikova. In 1995, they began working also in England with Betty Callaway, Jayne Torvill, and Christopher Dean.

In 1999, Drobiazko and Vanagas began spending time with Elena Tchaikovskaia in Moscow, while continuing to work with Maslennikova in Kaunas. They were also coached by Lilija Vanagiene and Anatoliy Petukhov. Drobiazko and Vanagas retired from competition following the 2001–2002 Olympic season, but returned to competition in 2005 to compete at their fifth Olympics. In preparation for the 2005–2006 season, they worked with Maslennikova, Rostislav Sinicyn, Igor Shpilband, Marina Zueva, Gintaras Svistunavicius, and David Liu, in the United States, Germany, Russia, and Lithuania. Drobiazko and Vanagas became the first and only figure skaters to compete at five Olympics. They retired again in 2006 following the World Championships.

Their choreographers included Elena Maslennikova, Jayne Torvill and Christopher Dean, Elena Tchaikovskaia, Tatiana Pomerantseva, Elena Kholina, Yuri Puzakov, Vasily Kleimenov, and Gintaras Svistunavicius.

=== Television ===
She appeared in the 1-7 seasons of ice show contest Ice Age.

== Personal life ==
Drobiazko was born in Moscow, but lived in Magadan, the Russian far north-east, until the age of six. Since the Olympics require citizenship of the country represented, Drobiazko obtained Lithuanian citizenship in 1993. She has been married to Vanagas since June 2000.

In the summer of 2022, during the Russian invasion of Ukraine, Drobiazko played a role in a ballet Swan Lake on ice with Vanagas in Sochi that was organized by former Olympic champion Tatiana Navka. On 10 August 2022, Lithuania's president Gitanas Nausėda signed a decree stripping off the Order of the Lithuanian Grand Duke Gediminas from both skaters.

On 15 September 2023, Lithuania's president Gitanas Nausėda signed a decree stripping Margarita Drobiazko of her Lithuanian citizenship due to her "public support for the Russian Federation during the 2022 Russian invasion of Ukraine".

== Programs ==
(with Povilas Vanagas)

Season	Original dance	Free dance	Exhibition
2006–present			Saudades do Brasil em Portugal by Carminho; Moonlight Sonata by Ludwig van Beethoven; In the Mood For Love (Yumeji's Theme) by Shigeru Umebayashi; Valse Triste by Jean Sibelius; Exogenesis, part 2 by Muse; Moon River by Henry Mancini; Je Suis Malade by Dalida; Belyi Kon ("White Horse") by Alexander Malinin; Yeah by Usher; Let Me Fall by Josh Groban; Malaguena by Ernesto Lecuona; Hey You by Pink Floyd; The Matrix Revolutions by Don Davis
2005–2006	Latin: La Playa by Miriam Jurado; Banca Banca by E-Type	The Phantom of the Opera by Andrew Lloyd Webber: The Point of No Return	Pirates of the Caribbean by Klaus Badelt: The Black Pearl; Will And Elizabeth; Moonlight Serenade; He's a Pirate
2002–2005			The Shadows of the Storm by Maxime Rodriguez; Poeta en la Mar by Vicente Amigo; My Baby by LeAnn Rimes; Possession by Ayman & Hisham
2001–2002	Spanish: Paso Doble Karida by S. Millington, T. Mercer Wilo Rose Light Symphony Orchestra; Flamenco Tacon by Cuadro Flamenco	Quelques Cris by Johnny Hallyday	Sang Pour Sang by Johnny Hallyday
2000–2001	Quickstep and Charleston: Yes Sir, That's My Baby by Briquet, Kahn & Donaldson; Dancing Fool by Gary Wilmot	Spente Le Stelle by Emma Shapplin; Tango medley: Tanguera by Sexteto Mayor; Tus Ojos de Cielo by Lisandro Adrover	"The Thread of Ariadna": Adagio (var. 1990) by Eleni Karaindrou
1999–2000	Latin: Historia de un Amor by Carlos Almaran; Ritmo de Bom Bom by Jubaba	Spente Le Stelle by Emma Shapplin	Torquay (From Dusk Till Dawn) by George Tomsco, The Leftovers
1998–1999	Waltz: Valse Triste by Jean Sibelius	Sunrise at Alcatraz by Deep Forest	Torquay (From Dusk Till Dawn) by George Tomsco, The Leftovers
1997–1998	Jive: Great Balls of Fire by Jerry Lee Lewis	Songs from the Victorious City by Anne Dudley, Jaz Coleman: Habebe; Endless Festival	
1996–1997	Tango: La cumparsita by Gerardo Matos Rodríguez performed by Orchestra Tango Cafe	Jazz medley: Mick's Blessings by The Style Council; Moanin' by The Jazz Messengers; Watermelon Man by Mongo Santamaría; Dropping Bombs on the White House by The Style Council	Bram Stoker's Dracula: The Brides by Wojciech Kilar
1995–1996	Paso Doble: España Cani	Wild at Heart by Angelo Badalamenti	Bram Stoker's Dracula: The Brides by Wojciech Kilar
1994–1995	Quickstep: Sing, Sing, Sing by Louis Prima	Stepping Out; Soapdish; Vamos A Bailar by Gipsy Kings	Fantasia by Wolfgang Amadeus Mozart; I Put a Spell on You by Screamin' Jay Hawkins
1993–1994	Rhumba: Besame Mucho	Happy Feet by Christopher Gunning; La Vie en Rose by Louis Armstrong, Édith Piaf	
1992–1993	Waltz	Tango by Astor Piazzolla	
1991–1992	Polka	Romeo and Juliet by Sergei Prokofiev	

== Competitive highlights ==
(ice dance with Povilas Vanagas)

Results
International
Event	1991–92	1992–93	1993–94	1994–95	1995–96	1996–97	1997–98	1998–99	1999–00	2000–01	2001–02	2004–05	2005–06
Winter Olympics	16th		12th				8th				5th		7th
World Championships	17th	13th	9th	12th	8th	10th	8th	6th	3rd	5th	4th		4th
European Championships	15th	11th	11th	11th	6th	8th	6th	5th	3rd	4th	4th		3rd
Grand Prix Final								4th	3rd	3rd	3rd		
GP Nations/Sparkassen				2nd	5th	5th				2nd			
GP NHK Trophy				6th	5th	4th		2nd	3rd	2nd	2nd		
GP Skate America										2nd	3rd		
GP Skate Canada				2nd	8th	4th	4th	2nd	1st				
GP Troph. France/Lalique				4th				3rd	3rd		3rd		
Karl Schäfer Memorial													1st
Nebelhorn Trophy		2nd	3rd										2nd
Skate Israel					1st	1st							
Piruetten		5th											
Winter Universiade		2nd											
National
Lithuanian Champ.	1st	1st	1st	1st	1st	1st	1st	1st	1st	1st	1st	1st	1st
Events marked GP became part of the Champions Series in 1995, renamed Grand Prix in 1998.
