= Shae-Lynn Bourne =

Canadian ice dancer and choreographer (born 1976)

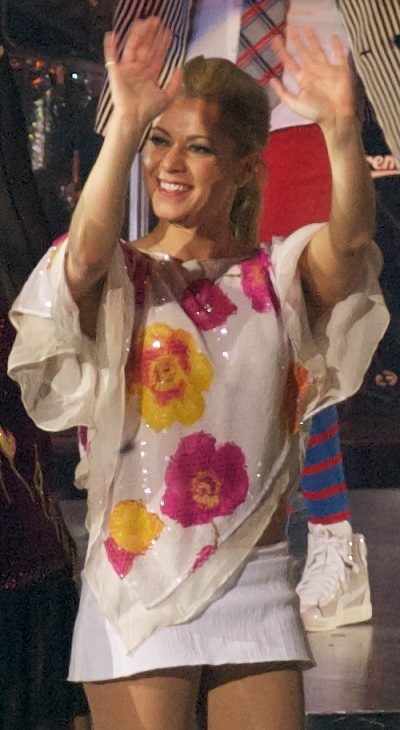
- Shae-Lynn Bourne in 2010

Personal information
- Born: January 24, 1976 (age 50) Chatham, Ontario, Canada
- Height: 1.63 m (5 ft 4 in)

Figure skating career
- Country: Canada
- Skating club: CPA Brossard; Granite Club
Medal record
Figure skating: Ice dancing
Representing Canada
World Championships
Gold medal – first place	2003 Washington, D.C.	Ice dancing
Silver medal – second place	2002 Nagano	Ice dancing
Bronze medal – third place	1999 Helsinki	Ice dancing
Bronze medal – third place	1998 Minneapolis	Ice dancing
Bronze medal – third place	1997 Lausanne	Ice dancing
Bronze medal – third place	1996 Edmonton	Ice dancing
Four Continents Championships
Gold medal – first place	2003 Beijing	Ice dancing
Gold medal – first place	2001 Salt Lake City	Ice dancing
Gold medal – first place	1999 Halifax	Ice dancing
Grand Prix Final
Gold medal – first place	2001–2002 Kitchener	Ice dancing
Silver medal – second place	1998–1999 St. Petersburg	Ice dancing
Gold medal – first place	1997–1998 Colorado Springs	Ice dancing

Shae-Lynn Bourne MSC (born January 24, 1976) is a Canadian ice dancer and choreographer. In 2003, she and partner Victor Kraatz became the first North American ice dancers to win a World Championship. They competed at three Winter Olympic Games, placing 10th at the 1994 Winter Olympics, 4th at the 1998 Winter Olympics, and 4th at the 2002 Winter Olympics.

Since retiring from competitive skating, she has become a renowned choreographer, choreographing programs for Olympic champions Yuzuru Hanyu and Nathan Chen, and World Champions including Evgenia Medvedeva and Ilia Malinin. During the 2020, 2023, and 2025 ISU Skating Awards, Shae-Lynn was named Best Choreographer.

== Personal life ==
Bourne was born on January 24, 1976, in Chatham, Ontario. She has an older brother, Chris, a younger sister, Calea and younger brother Sean. She married her skating coach Nikolai Morozov on August 12, 2005, but the marriage was short-lived, and they divorced in July 2007. She is currently married to Bohdan Turok with whom she has a son, Kai, born in June 2012. She worked as a coach and a choreographer at the Granite Club in Toronto, then moved to the Carolina Ice Palace in Charleston, South Carolina in 2019.

== Career ==
Bourne began skating in 1983. Early in her career, she competed in pair skating with partner Andrew Bertleff. She stated that she enjoyed pairs "but I was dropped a lot, there were a lot of head injuries, and I finally said, 'No more, I'm not going to last much longer if I kept doing this.'"

=== Partnership with Kraatz ===
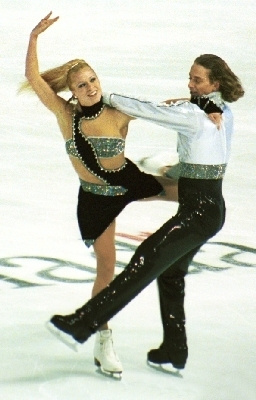
Shae-Lynn Bourne with Victor Kraatz

Interested in switching to ice dance, Bourne traveled to Boucherville, Quebec in 1991 after a coach, Paul Wirtz, suggested that she try out with Victor Kraatz. Although at first Kraatz did not see himself with Bourne, they skated together for a week and a week after she returned to Ontario he asked to form a partnership.

During their career, Bourne and Kraatz were coached at various times by Tatiana Tarasova, Natalia Dubova, Uschi Keszler, Marina Klimova and Sergei Ponomarenko, and Nikolai Morozov.

According to figure skating writer and historian Ellyn Kestnbaum, their performance emphasized the athleticism of ice dance instead of the traditional ballroom style approach.

In 1993, Bourne and Kraatz came in 14th place at the World Championships. A year later, at the 1994 Winter Olympics, they came in "a respectable" 10th place. In 1995, they came in fourth place at Worlds.

For the 1996—1997 season, "in response to suggestions that they increase the complexity and danciness of their free skate", they used music from the 1956 movie High Society, in which they used a mostly athletic and non-narrative approach with mostly quickstep and swing rhythms that emphasized the soft knees they were known for. Kestnbaum also stated, "Only their costumes and the occasional reliance on traditional dance holds suggested any gendered identity for each partner". Their choice of rhythms allowed them to continue to emphasize their technique and athleticism while following the sport's rules and guidelines, but without depending upon "the erotic narratives attached to other ballroom rhythms". As a result, both partners were able to present themselves as athletes capable of executing positions and able to support each other's weight, while following the ice dance traditions of "male-female couplehood". in this way, along with their choice of dance holds, rhythms, and costumes, they were able to establish their performance within the sport's ballroom dance traditions.

For the 1997–98 season, their free dance was modeled after Riverdance, with footwork instruction provided by Riverdance lead dancer Colin Dunne. Bourne and Kraatz became known for their deep edges and soft knees. They were credited with perfecting and popularizing the hydroblading technique. The program included a great amount of up-and-down hops in place on their toes and side-by-side footwork. They won the Grand Prix Finals in 1997. At the 1998 Winter Olympics, they came in fourth place.

In 1999, they won the gold medal at Four Continents. In 2000, Bourne and Kraatz choreographed their own free dance program; it was first season vocal music was allowed in ice dance, so their music was set to vocal selections by Harry Connick, Jr. They missed the 2000 Four Continents and 2000 World Championships due to Bourne's knee surgery. In spring 2000, they changed coaches, moving to Tatiana Tarasova and Nikolai Morozov in Newington, Connecticut. They returned to competition in 2001, and came in first place at Four Continents and fourth place at Worlds.

Bourne and Kraatz withdrew from their 2002 Grand Prix events due to Bourne's injury. They won their tenth Canadian national title and their third Four Continents title. They competed at the Olympics for the third time in 2002 and came in fourth place. They also won the gold medal at the Grand Prix Finals and came in second place at Worlds that year. Bourne and Kraatz went on to win the gold medal at the 2003 Four Continents and become the first World champions in ice dance from North America, winning gold at the 2003 World Championships in Washington, D.C. They retired from competition at the end of the season.

On October 21, 2003, they announced the end of their partnership; while Bourne enjoyed show skating, Kraatz said he wanted "to experiment with other things and follow up on other dreams that I have". In January 2007, they were inducted into the Skate Canada Hall of Fame. In 2022 Bourne was inducted into the Chatham-Kent Cultural Hall of Fame in recognition of her contributions to the art of dance.

=== Ice shows ===
Bourne has skated solo in shows and tours around the world, such as Stars on Ice, Champions on Ice in North America and Japan, Art on Ice in Switzerland, the 2009 Ice All Stars and the 2010 Festa on Ice, held in Seoul, South Korea, and in Yuzuru Hanyu Notte Stellata, a commemoration event of the 2011 Tōhoku earthquake and tsunami led by two-time Olympic champion Yuzuru Hanyu. She has also competed on figure skating reality shows like Battle of the Blades (paired with former NHL star player Claude Lemieux, finished second overall) on CBC and Thin Ice on ABC (paired with American pair skater John Zimmerman, finished second overall).

=== Coach and choreographer ===
Bourne formerly coached Kaitlyn Weaver / Andrew Poje, and Cathy Reed / Chris Reed. She has choreographed programs for:

- (United States) Jeremy Abbott
- (Japan) Yuna Aoki
- (United States) Mariah Bell
- (Czech Republic) Michal Březina
- (South Korea) Jun-hwan Cha
- (Canada) Kate Charbonneau
- (Canada) Alaine Chartrand
- (United States) Nathan Chen
- (China) Chen Yudong
- (Canada) Vaughn Chipeur
- (Canada) Wesley Chiu
- (South Africa) Michaela Du Toit
- (United States) Sarah Everhardt
- (Canada) Stephen Gogolev
- (Russia) Petr Gumennik
- (Japan) Yuzuru Hanyu
- (Japan) Wakaba Higuchi
- (Japan) Marin Honda
- (Japan) Rika Hongo
- (China) Jin Boyang
- (Japan) Yuma Kagiyama
- (Switzerland) Livia Kaiser
- (Japan) Rika Kihira
- (South Korea) Kim Chae-yeon
- (United States) Alexa Knierim / Brandon Frazier
- (Japan) Misato Komatsubara / Tim Koleto
- (Finland) Kiira Korpi
- (Russia) Alena Kostornaia
- (Canada) Annabelle Langlois / Cody Hay
- (South Korea) Lee Hae-in
- (Hong Kong) Yi Christy Leung
- (United States) Ilia Malinin
- (United States) Katie McBeath / Daniil Parkman
- (Russia) Evgenia Medvedeva
- (Japan) Kao Miura
- (Japan) Riku Miura / Ryuichi Kihara
- (Mexico) Andrea Montesinos Cantú
- (Canada) Nicolas Nadeau
- (Japan) Yuka Nagai
- (Canada) Alexandra Najarro
- (Japan) Rio Nakata
- (Japan) Kosho Oshima
- (Canada) Kaetlyn Osmond
- (China) Pang Qing / Tong Jian
- (Estonia) Niina Petrõkina
- (United States) Camden Pulkinen
- (Russia) Elena Radionova
- (Canada) Kevin Reynolds
- (Italy) Matteo Rizzo
- (Canada) Joannie Rochette
- (Canada) Andrei Rogozine
- (Japan) Kaori Sakamoto
- (Kazakhstan) Sofia Samodelkina
- (Canada) Julianne Séguin / Charlie Bilodeau
- (Kazakhstan) Mikhail Shaidorov
- (Canada) Hetty Shi
- (Japan) Koshiro Shimada
- (Japan) Mao Shimada
- (South Korea) Shin Ji-a
- (Japan) Rion Sumiyoshi
- (Japan) Akiko Suzuki
- (Japan) Daisuke Takahashi
- (United States) Lindsay Thorngren
- (Japan) Kazuki Tomono
- (United States) Andrew Torgashev
- (Russia) Elizaveta Tuktamysheva
- (Japan) Shoma Uno
- (Latvia) Deniss Vasiljevs
- (United States) Ashley Wagner
- (Japan) Rinka Watanabe
- (South Korea) You Young
- (Canada) Kara Yun

Show choreography

- (Japan) Shizuka Arakawa
- (Canada) Kurt Browning
- (United States) Sasha Cohen
- (Russia) Ekaterina Gordeeva
- (South Korea) Yuna Kim
- (Kazakhstan) Denis Ten

== Advocacy ==
Bourne has used her celebrity to speak out against child abuse. She and Kraatz skated in numerous charity shows such as "Dreams On Ice". Bourne was the honorary chairperson for the "Every Life Counts" campaign for Chatham-Kent. Bourne and Kraatz received the Canadian Governor General's Meritorious Service Crosses for speaking out about unfair judging practices.

== Programs ==
(with Kraatz)

Season	Original dance	Free dance
2002–2003	Waltz: Frühlingsstimmen, op. 410 (Voices of Spring); Polka: Unter Donner und Blitz, op. 324 (Amidst Thunder and Lightning) by Johann Strauss II	Adagio of the 21st Century by Remo Giazotto, Tomaso Albinoni performed by Sarah Brightman, original music composition and music arrangement by Alexander Goldstein
2001–2002	Flamenco: Girlfight by Theodore Shapiro; Tango: Cell Block Tango (from Chicago) by Bob Fosse	Billie Jean; In the Closet; Smile; Wanna Be Startin' Somethin'; Don't Stop Til You Get Enough by Michael Jackson
2000–2001	Quickstep: Jumpin' Jack by Big Bad Voodoo Daddy; Foxtrot: Hey Big Spender (from Sweet Charity) performed by Shirley Bassey; Quickstep: Jumpin' Jack by Big Bad Voodoo Daddy	March With Me by Vangelis performed by Montserrat Caballé
1999–2000	Latin combination: You Are My Home _{by Diane Warren; performed by Chayanne & Vanessa Williams}; The Cup of Life; _{by Desmond Child & Draco Rosa;} _{performed by Ricky Martin}	It Had to be You _{by Gus Khan;} _{performed by Harry Connick Jr.}; Come By Me _{by Harry Connick Jr.}
1998–1999	Waltz: Seachrán Charn Tsiail; by Clannad	Meet Her at the Love Parade; by Da Hool
1997–1998	Jive: Greased lightnin'; (from Grease soundtrack)	Riverdance (soundtrack)
1996–1997	Tango	Overture (from High Society) _{by Cole Porter}; Willow Weep for Me _{by Ann Ronell}; Opus No. 1 _{by Sy Oliver}
1995–1996	Paso Doble: España Cañí	Papa Was a Rollin' Stone _{by Norman Whitfield & Barrett Strong} _{covered by George Michael}; Killer _{by Adamski & Seal} _{covered by George Michael}; Harlem Nocturne _{by Earle Hagen}; War _{by Norman Whitfield & Barrett Strong} _{covered by Frankie Goes to Hollywood}; Relax _{by Peter Gill, Holly Johnson, Brian Nash, & Mark O'Toole} _{performed by Frankie Goes to Hollywood}
1994–1995	Quickstep: Goody Goody	Beautiful Girl _{by Günter Noris}; Sing, Sing, Sing _{by Louis Prima}
1993–1994	Rhumba: Johnny Guitar _{by Peggy Lee}	Raposchol; Devotchka Nadya _{by traditional} Kalinka; by Igor Tuhmanov

== Results ==
(with Kraatz)

GP: Part of Champions Series from 1995–96 season, renamed Grand Prix series in 1998–99

International
Event	92–93	93–94	94–95	95–96	96–97	97–98	98–99	99–00	00–01	01–02	02–03
Olympics		10th				4th				4th	
Worlds	14th	6th	4th	3rd	3rd	3rd	3rd		4th	2nd	1st
Four Continents							1st		1st		1st
GP Final				4th	1st	2nd		5th		1st	
GP Cup of Russia								2nd			
GP Lalique										2nd	
GP Nations/Spark.		5th			2nd		2nd	1st	3rd		
GP NHK Trophy				2nd		2nd					
GP Skate America									3rd		
GP Skate Canada	6th	3rd	1st	1st	1st	1st	1st			1st	
Nebelhorn Trophy	1st										
National
Canadian Champ.	1st	1st	1st	1st	1st	1st	1st		1st	1st	1st
WD: Withdrew
