= Kris Wirtz =

Canadian pair skater (born 1969)

Personal information
- Born: December 12, 1969 (age 56) Marathon, Ontario, Canada
- Height: 1.70 m (5 ft 7 in)

Figure skating career
- Country: Canada
- Retired: 2003
Medal record
Pairs' Figure skating
Representing Canada
Four Continents Championships
Silver medal – second place	1999 Halifax	Pairs

Kris Wirtz (born December 12, 1969) is a Canadian former pair skater. With Kristy Sargeant, he is the 1999 Four Continents silver medallist, the 1994 Skate Canada International champion, and a two-time Canadian national champion. The pair competed at two Winter Olympics.

== Career ==
Early in his career, Wirtz competed at the Canadian Championships in singles, ice dance, and fours, as well as pairs. He competed with Sherry Ball at the 1992 Winter Olympics in Albertville. Later in 1992, he teamed up with Kristy Sargeant.

Sargeant/Wirtz made their debut at the 1993 Canadian Championships and finished fifth. The following season, they won the national silver medal and were assigned to the 1994 Winter Olympics in Lillehammer, where they placed tenth. They then finished 11th at the 1994 World Championships.

In the 1994–95 season, Sergeant/Wirtz won gold at the 1994 Skate Canada International, having placed seventh a year earlier, but dipped to fifth at the Canadian Championships. The next season, they reached the national podium again and finished seventh at their second Worlds. The pair would appear at a total of seven World Championships during their career, placing as high as sixth (1997, 1999).

In 1998, Sargeant/Wirtz won their first national title and were sent to the 1998 Winter Olympics in Nagano. They had a very disappointing Olympics, placing 12th after many problems, but came back and were the only pair in the entire event to skate two clean programs at the 1998 World Championships, and were robbed of at least the silver medal, placing a disgraceful seventh. The pair became national champions for the second time in 1999, where they had been widely expected to lose to the rising stars Jamie Sale and David Pelletier, who had posted better results on the grand prix circuit. They had their best chance ever to medal at worlds that year, placing fourth after the short program, but two minor mistakes in the long dropped them to sixth, while the Polish bronze medallists had two major errors which would have left the door wide open for them had they skated cleanly.

Thereafter they were soundly passed by Sale and Pelletier as the top Canadian team, and never seriously factored on the world or international stage ever again. They surprised many by retiring after the 2001 season, when still solidly entrenched as Canada's number 2 team they were virtual locks for a spot on the 3 team 2002 Olympic team. They returned to competition for the 2002–2003 season, ending their amateur careers withdrawing prior to the long program at the 2003 Canadians with injury.

Wirtz was the Canadian team captain for five years. They work as coaches at the Kitchener-Waterloo Skating Club in Waterloo, Ontario, Canada.

== Personal life ==
Wirtz is from Marathon, Ontario. His brother was Paul Wirtz, a figure-skating coach deceased April 6, 2006, and his nephew is pair skater Sean Wirtz.

Wirtz married Kristy Sargeant in 1999 and their first child together was born in 2002. On January 3, 2010, the Olympic torch relay passed through Marathon, Ontario. Wirtz's father, Gunter Wirtz, carried the Olympic torch in a procession through the local hockey arena.

== Competitive highlights ==
=== With Ball ===
International
Event	1991–92
Winter Olympics	12th
World Championships	10th
Nebelhorn Trophy	1st
National
Canadian Championships	3rd

=== With Sargeant ===
International
Event	1992–93	1993–94	1994–95	1995–96	1996–97	1997–98	1998–99	1999–00	2000–01	2001–02	2002–03
Olympics		10th				12th					
Worlds		11th		7th	6th	7th	6th	10th	8th		
Four Continents							2nd	4th	7th		
GP Cup of Russia									5th		
GP Nations Cup/ Sparkassen			4th		4th				4th		WD
GP Skate America				6th			2nd				
GP Skate Canada		7th	1st		4th	5th	4th	3rd			
GP Trophée de France/Lalique				6th			4th	5th			
National
Canadians	5th	2nd	5th	2nd	2nd	1st	1st	2nd	2nd		
GP = Became part of Champions Series in 1995–96 season, renamed Grand Prix in 1998–99 season WD = Withdrew

=== Men's singles ===
National
Event	1988–89
Canadian Championships	2nd J
