= Kristy Sargeant =

Canadian pair skater (born 1974)

Personal information
- Born: January 24, 1974 (age 52) Red Deer, Alberta, Canada
- Height: 1.52 m (5 ft 0 in)

Figure skating career
- Country: Canada
- Partner: Kris Wirtz; Colin Epp (until 1992)
- Retired: 2003
Medal record
Representing Canada
Pairs' Figure skating
Four Continents Championships
Silver medal – second place	1999 Halifax	Pairs

Kristy Lee Sargeant-Wirtz (born January 24, 1974) is a Canadian former pair skater. With Kris Wirtz, she is the 1999 Four Continents silver medallist, the 1994 Skate Canada International champion, and a two-time Canadian national champion. The pair competed at two Winter Olympics.

== Career ==
Sargeant competed with Colin Epp early in her career. In 1992, she teamed up with Kris Wirtz.

Sargeant/Wirtz made their debut at the 1993 Canadian Championships and finished fifth. The following season, they won the national silver medal and were assigned to the 1994 Winter Olympics in Lillehammer, where they placed tenth. They then finished 11th at the 1994 World Championships.

In the 1994–95 season, Sergeant/Wirtz won gold at the 1994 Skate Canada International, having placed seventh a year earlier, but dipped to fifth at the Canadian Championships. The next season, they reached the national podium again and finished seventh at their second Worlds. The pair would appear at a total of seven World Championships during their career, placing as high as sixth (1997, 1999).

In 1998, Sargeant/Wirtz won their first national title and were sent to the 1998 Winter Olympics in Nagano. They placed 12th in their second Olympic appearance. The pair became national champions for the second time in 1999.

Sargeant/Wirtz announced their retirement from competition in 2001. They work as coaches at the Kitchener-Waterloo Skating Club , based in Waterloo, Ontario, Canada.

== Personal life ==
Sargeant gave birth to her and Jason Turner's daughter, Triston, in 1992. She married Kris Wirtz in 1999 and their daughter, Briana, was born in May 2002. Sargeant-Wirtz is the sister of Lisa Sargeant, the 1990 Canadian ladies champion.

== Results ==
(with Kris Wirtz)

International
Event	1992–93	1993–94	1994–95	1995–96	1996–97	1997–98	1998–99	1999–00	2000–01	2001–02	2002–03
Olympics		10th				12th					
Worlds		11th		7th	6th	7th	6th	10th	8th		
Four Continents							2nd	4th	7th		
GP Cup of Russia									5th		
GP Nations Cup/ Sparkassen			4th		4th				4th		WD
GP Skate America				6th			2nd				
GP Skate Canada		7th	1st		4th	5th	4th	3rd			
GP Trophée de France/Lalique				6th			4th	5th			
National
Canadians	5th	2nd	5th	2nd	2nd	1st	1st	2nd	2nd		
GP = Became part of Champions Series in 1995–96 season, renamed Grand Prix in 1998–99 season WD = Withdrew
