= 1997 Skate America =

- Type: Champions Series
- Date: October 23 – 25
- Season: 1997–98
- Location: Detroit, Michigan
- Host: U.S. Figure Skating
- Venue: Joe Louis Arena

Champions
- Men's singles: (United States) Todd Eldredge
- Ladies' singles: (United States) Michelle Kwan
- Pairs: (Russia) Marina Eltsova / Andrey Bushkov
- Ice dance: (United States) Elizabeth Punsalan / Jerod Swallow
- Previous: 1996 Skate America
- Next: 1998 Skate America
- Next Grand Prix: 1997 Nations Cup

The 1997 Skate America was the first event of six in the 1997–98 ISU Champions Series, a senior-level international invitational competition series. It was held at the Joe Louis Arena in Detroit, Michigan on October 23–25. Medals were awarded in the disciplines of men's singles, ladies' singles, pair skating, and ice dancing. Skaters earned points toward qualifying for the 1997–98 Champions Series Final. The compulsory dance was the Golden Waltz.

== Results ==
=== Men ===
Rank	Name	Nation	TFP	SP	FS
1	Todd Eldredge	United States	1.5	1	1
2	Evgeni Plushenko	Russia	3.0	2	2
3	Alexander Abt	Russia	5.0	4	3
4	Scott Davis	United States	6.5	5	4
5	Viacheslav Zagorodniuk	Ukraine	8.5	3	7
6	Evgeny Pliuta	Ukraine	10.5	11	5
7	Takeshi Honda	Japan	10.5	9	6
8	Jayson Dénommée	Canada	11.0	6	8
9	Michael Chack	United States	14.0	10	9
10	Jens ter Laak	Germany	14.5	7	11
11	Gabriel Monnier	France	16.0	12	10
12	Stanick Jeannette	France	16.0	8	12

=== Ladies ===
Rank	Name	Nation	TFP	SP	FS
1	Michelle Kwan	United States	1.5	1	1
2	Tara Lipinski	United States	3.0	2	2
3	Elena Sokolova	Russia	6.0	6	3
4	Angela Nikodinov	United States	6.0	4	4
5	Yulia Lavrenchuk	Ukraine	6.5	3	5
6	Julia Lautowa	Austria	8.5	5	6
7	Yuka Kanazawa	Japan	11.0	8	7
8	Fanny Cagnard	France	13.0	10	8
9	Angela Derochie	Canada	13.5	9	9
10	Tony Bombardieri	Italy	13.5	7	10
11	Franziska Guenther	Germany	16.5	11	11

=== Pairs ===
Rank	Name	Nation	TFP	SP	FS
1	Marina Eltsova / Andrey Bushkov	Russia	1.5	1	1
2	Kyoko Ina / Jason Dungjen	United States	3.5	3	2
3	Evgenia Shishkova / Vadim Naumov	Russia	4.0	2	3
4	Michelle Menzies / Jean-Michel Bombardier	Canada	6.5	5	4
5	Mariana Khalturina / Andrey Kroukov	Kazakhstan	8.0	4	6
6	Danielle Hartsell / Steven Hartsell	United States	8.5	7	5
7	Shelby Lyons / Brian Wells	United States	10.0	6	7
8	Oľga Beständigová / Josev Bestandig	Slovakia	12.0	8	8

=== Ice dancing ===
Rank	Name	Nation	TFP	CD	OD	FD
1	Elizabeth Punsalan / Jerod Swallow	United States	2.0	1	1	1
2	Barbara Fusar-Poli / Maurizio Margaglio	Italy	4.0	2	2	2
3	Anna Semenovich / Vladimir Fedorov	Russia	7.0	4	4	3
4	Kateřina Mrázová / Martin Šimeček	Czech Republic	7.0	3	3	4
5	Dominique Deniaud / Martial Jaffredo	France	10.6	5	6	5
6	Naomi Lang / Peter Tchernyshev	United States	11.4	6	5	6
7	Megan Wing / Aaron Lowe	Canada	14.0	7	7	7
8	Šárka Vondrková / Lukáš Král	Czech Republic	16.0	8	8	8
