= 1999 Skate America =

- Type: Grand Prix
- Date: October 27 – 31
- Season: 1999–2000
- Location: Colorado Springs, Colorado
- Host: U.S. Figure Skating
- Venue: World Arena

Champions
- Men's singles: (Russia) Alexei Yagudin
- Ladies' singles: (United States) Michelle Kwan
- Pairs: (Canada) Jamie Salé / David Pelletier
- Ice dance: (Italy) Barbara Fusar-Poli / Maurizio Margaglio
- Previous: 1998 Skate America
- Next: 2000 Skate America
- Next Grand Prix: 1999 Skate Canada International

The 1999 Skate America was the first event of six in the 1999–2000 ISU Grand Prix of Figure Skating, a senior-level international invitational competition series. It was held at the World Arena in Colorado Springs, Colorado on October 27–31. Medals were awarded in the disciplines of men's singles, ladies' singles, pair skating, and ice dancing. Skaters earned points toward qualifying for the 1999–2000 Grand Prix Final. The compulsory dance was the Viennese Waltz.

== Results ==
=== Men ===
Timothy Goebel made history by becoming the first person to land three quadruple jumps in one program. In the men's free skating, he landed a quad salchow, a quad toe loop in combination, and a quad toe loop as a solo jump.

Rank	Name	Nation	TFP	SP	FS
1	Alexei Yagudin	Russia	1.5	1	1
2	Timothy Goebel	United States	3.5	3	2
3	Elvis Stojko	Canada	5.0	4	3
4	Michael Weiss	United States	5.0	2	4
5	Matthew Savoie	United States	7.5	5	5
6	Alexander Abt	Russia	9.5	7	6
7	Anthony Liu	Australia	10.0	6	7
8	Stanick Jeannette	France	12.5	9	8
9	Michael Hopfes	Germany	15.0	12	9
10	Thierry Cerez	France	15.5	11	10
11	Yosuke Takeuchi	Japan	16.0	10	11
12	Szabolcs Vidrai	Hungary	16.0	8	12

=== Ladies ===
Rank	Name	Nation	TFP	SP	FS
1	Michelle Kwan	United States	1.5	1	1
2	Julia Soldatova	Russia	4.0	4	2
3	Elena Sokolova	Russia	4.5	3	3
4	Sarah Hughes	United States	5.0	2	4
5	Júlia Sebestyén	Hungary	9.0	8	5
6	Alisa Drei	Finland	9.0	6	6
7	Angela Nikodinov	United States	9.5	5	7
8	Yuka Kanazawa	Japan	12.5	9	8
9	Julia Lautowa	Austria	13.5	7	10
10	Nadine Gosselin	Canada	14.0	10	9
11	Dorothee Derroitte	Belgium	16.5	11	11

=== Pairs ===
Rank	Name	Nation	TFP	SP	FS
1	Jamie Salé / David Pelletier	Canada	1.5	1	1
2	Sarah Abitbol / Stéphane Bernadis	France	3.5	3	2
3	Elena Berezhnaya / Anton Sikharulidze	Russia	5.0	4	3
4	Peggy Schwarz / Mirko Müller	Germany	5.0	2	4
5	Kyoko Ina / John Zimmerman	United States	7.5	5	5
6	Tiffany Scott / Philip Dulebohn	United States	9.5	7	6
7	Tatiana Totmianina / Maxim Marinin	Russia	11.0	8	7
8	Danielle Hartsell / Steve Hartsell	United States	11.0	6	8

=== Ice dancing ===
Rank	Name	Nation	TFP	CD	OD	FD
1	Barbara Fusar-Poli / Maurizio Margaglio	Italy	3.0	2	2	1
2	Irina Lobacheva / Ilia Averbukh	Russia	3.0	1	1	2
3	Naomi Lang / Peter Tchernyshev	United States	6.4	4	3	3
4	Kati Winkler / René Lohse	Germany	7.6	3	4	4
5	Jamie Silverstein / Justin Pekarek	United States	10.0	5	5	5
6	Josée Piché / Pascal Denis	Canada	12.0	6	6	6
7	Kornélia Bárány / András Rosnik	Hungary	14.0	7	7	7
8	Nozomi Watanabe / Akiyuki Kido	Japan	16.0	8	8	8
