= 1998 Skate America =

- Type: Grand Prix
- Date: October 29 – November 1
- Season: 1998–99
- Location: Detroit, Michigan
- Host: U.S. Figure Skating
- Venue: Joe Louis Arena

Champions
- Men's singles: (Russia) Alexei Yagudin
- Ladies' singles: (Russia) Maria Butyrskaya
- Pairs: (Russia) Elena Berezhnaya / Anton Sikharulidze
- Ice dance: (France) Marina Anissina / Gwendal Peizerat
- Previous: 1997 Skate America
- Next: 1999 Skate America
- Next GP: 1998 Skate Canada International

The 1998 Skate America was the first event of six in the 1998–99 ISU Grand Prix of Figure Skating, a senior-level international invitational competition series. It was held at the Joe Louis Arena in Detroit, Michigan on October 29 – November 1. Medals were awarded in the disciplines of men's singles, ladies' singles, pair skating, and ice dancing. Skaters earned points toward qualifying for the 1998–99 Grand Prix Final.

== Results ==
=== Men ===
| Rank | Name | Nation | TFP | SP | FS |
|---|---|---|---|---|---|
| 1 | Alexei Yagudin | Russia | 1.5 | 1 | 1 |
| 2 | Michael Weiss | United States | 3.5 | 3 | 2 |
| 3 | Alexei Urmanov | Russia | 5.0 | 4 | 3 |
| 4 | Elvis Stojko | Canada | 5.0 | 2 | 4 |
| 5 | Derrick Delmore | United States | 7.5 | 5 | 5 |
| 6 | Laurent Tobel | France | 9.0 | 6 | 6 |
| 7 | Michael Hopfes | Germany | 11.0 | 8 | 7 |
| 8 | Yamato Tamura | Japan | 11.5 | 7 | 8 |
| 9 | Shepherd Clark | United States | 14.5 | 9 | 10 |
| 10 | Jean-Francois Hebert | Canada | 15.0 | 12 | 9 |
| 11 | Frédéric Dambier | France | 16.0 | 10 | 11 |
| 12 | Yourii Litvinov | Kazakhstan | 17.5 | 11 | 12 |

=== Ladies ===
| Rank | Name | Nation | TFP | SP | FS |
|---|---|---|---|---|---|
| 1 | Maria Butyrskaya | Russia | 1.5 | 1 | 1 |
| 2 | Elena Sokolova | Russia | 3.5 | 3 | 2 |
| 3 | Angela Nikodinov | United States | 4.0 | 2 | 3 |
| 4 | Nicole Bobek | United States | 6.0 | 4 | 4 |
| 5 | Tatijana Malinina | Uzbekistan | 7.5 | 5 | 5 |
| 6 | Anna Rechnio | Poland | 9.0 | 6 | 6 |
| 7 | Brittney McConn | United States | 10.5 | 7 | 7 |
| 8 | Jennifer Robinson | Canada | 12.0 | 8 | 8 |
| 9 | Shizuka Arakawa | Japan | 14.5 | 10 | 9 |
| 10 | Silvia Fontana | Italy | 14.5 | 9 | 10 |

=== Pairs ===
| Rank | Name | Nation | TFP | SP | FS |
|---|---|---|---|---|---|
| 1 | Elena Berezhnaya / Anton Sikharulidze | Russia | 1.5 | 1 | 1 |
| 2 | Kristy Sargeant / Kris Wirtz | Canada | 3.0 | 2 | 2 |
| 3 | Victoria Maksuta / Vladislav Zhovnirsky | Russia | 5.0 | 4 | 3 |
| 4 | Danielle Hartsell / Steve Hartsell | United States | 5.5 | 3 | 4 |
| 5 | Kyoko Ina / John Zimmerman | United States | 8.5 | 7 | 5 |
| 6 | Sarah Abitbol / Stéphane Bernadis | France | 8.5 | 5 | 6 |
| 7 | Mariana Khalturina / Andrei Kroukov | Kazakhstan | 10.0 | 6 | 7 |
| 8 | Tiffany Stiegler / Johnnie Stiegler | United States | 12.0 | 8 | 8 |

=== Ice dancing ===
| Rank | Name | Nation | TFP | CD | OD | FD |
|---|---|---|---|---|---|---|
| 1 | Marina Anissina / Gwendal Peizerat | France | 2.0 | 1 | 1 | 1 |
| 2 | Irina Lobacheva / Ilia Averbukh | Russia | 4.0 | 2 | 2 | 2 |
| 3 | Barbara Fusar-Poli / Maurizio Margaglio | Italy | 6.0 | 3 | 3 | 3 |
| 4 | Anna Semenovich / Vladimir Fedorov | Russia | 8.0 | 4 | 4 | 4 |
| 5 | Naomi Lang / Peter Tchernyshev | United States | 10.6 | 5 | 6 | 5 |
| 6 | Chantal Lefebvre / Michel Brunet | Canada | 11.4 | 6 | 5 | 6 |
| 7 | Eve Chalom / Mathew Gates | United States | 14.0 | 7 | 7 | 7 |
| 8 | Angelika Fuhring / Bruno Ellinger | Austria | 16.0 | 8 | 8 | 8 |
| 9 | Rie Arikawa / Kenji Miyamoto | Japan | 18.0 | 9 | 9 | 9 |
