= 2000 Skate America =

- Type: Grand Prix
- Date: October 26 – 29
- Season: 2000–01
- Location: Colorado Springs, Colorado
- Host: U.S. Figure Skating
- Venue: World Arena

Champions
- Men's singles: (United States) Timothy Goebel
- Ladies' singles: (United States) Michelle Kwan
- Pairs: (Canada) Jamie Salé / David Pelletier
- Ice dance: (Italy) Barbara Fusar-Poli / Maurizio Margaglio
- Previous: 1999 Skate America
- Next: 2001 Skate America
- Next Grand Prix: 2000 Skate Canada International

The 2000 Skate America was the first event of six in the 2000–01 ISU Grand Prix of Figure Skating, a senior-level international invitational competition series. It was held at the World Arena in Colorado Springs, Colorado on October 26–29. Medals were awarded in the disciplines of men's singles, ladies' singles, pair skating, and ice dancing. Skaters earned points toward qualifying for the 2000–01 Grand Prix Final. The compulsory dance was the Westminster Waltz.

== Results ==
=== Men ===
Guo Zhengxin was assigned to Skate America but did not compete.

Rank	Name	Nation	TFP	SP	FS
1	Timothy Goebel	United States	2.0	2	1
2	Alexei Yagudin	Russia	2.5	1	2
3	Todd Eldredge	United States	5.5	5	3
4	Emanuel Sandhu	Canada	5.5	3	4
5	Alexander Abt	Russia	8.0	6	5
6	Vincent Restencourt	France	9.0	4	7
7	Roman Serov	Russia	9.5	7	6
8	Trifun Zivanovic	United States	12.0	8	8
9	Yamato Tamura	Japan	14.0	10	9
10	Silvio Smalun	Germany	14.5	9	10
11	André Kaden	Germany	16.5	11	11

=== Ladies ===
Rank	Name	Nation	TFP	SP	FS
1	Michelle Kwan	United States	1.5	1	1
2	Sarah Hughes	United States	3.0	2	2
3	Elena Sokolova	Russia	4.5	3	3
4	Viktoria Volchkova	Russia	6.0	4	4
5	Angela Nikodinov	United States	6.5	7	6
6	Michelle Currie	Canada	9.5	5	7
7	Sabina Wojtala	Poland	10.0	10	5
8	Sun Siyin	China	12.0	6	9
9	Chisato Shiina	Japan	12.15	9	8
10	Caroline Gülke	Germany	14.0	8	10
11	Arisa Yamazaki	Japan	16.5	11	11

=== Pairs ===
Rank	Name	Nation	TFP	SP	FS
1	Jamie Salé / David Pelletier	Canada	2.0	2	1
2	Shen Xue / Zhao Hongbo	China	2.5	1	2
3	Tatiana Totmianina / Maxim Marinin	Russia	4.5	3	3
4	Kyoko Ina / John Zimmerman	United States	6.5	5	4
5	Tiffany Scott / Philip Dulebohn	United States	7.0	4	5
6	Jacinthe Larivière / Lenny Faustino	Canada	9.0	6	6
7	Jessica Miller / Jeffrey Weiss	United States	10.5	7	7
WD	Mariana Kautz / Norman Jeschke	Germany		8	

=== Ice dancing ===
Rank	Name	Nation	TFP	CD	OD	FD
1	Barbara Fusar-Poli / Maurizio Margaglio	Italy	2.0	1	1	1
2	Margarita Drobiazko / Povilas Vanagas	Lithuania	4.8	4	2	2
3	Shae-Lynn Bourne / Victor Kraatz	Canada	6.2	2	4	3
4	Galit Chait / Sergey Sakhnovsky	Israel	7.8	5	3	4
5	Naomi Lang / Peter Tchernyshev	United States	9.2	3	5	5
6	Beata Handra / Charles Sinek	United States	13.0	7	7	6
7	Alia Ouabdelsselam / Benjamin Delmas	France	14.0	6	6	8
8	Véronique Delobel / Olivier Chapuis	France	15.0	8	8	7
9	Anastasia Grebenkina / Vitaly Novikov	Russia	18.0	9	9	9
10	Nakako Tsuzuki / Rinat Farkhoutdinov	Japan	20.0	10	10	10
11	Nina Ulanova / Alexander Pavlov	Russia	22.0	11	11	11
