= 2001 Skate America =

- Type: Grand Prix
- Date: October 24 – 28
- Season: 2001–02
- Location: Colorado Springs, Colorado
- Host: U.S. Figure Skating
- Venue: World Arena

Champions
- Men's singles: (United States) Timothy Goebel
- Ladies' singles: (United States) Michelle Kwan
- Pairs: (Canada) Jamie Salé / David Pelletier
- Ice dance: (Canada) Shae Lynne Bourne / Victor Kraatz
- Previous: 2000 Skate America
- Next: 2002 Skate America
- Next GP: 2001 Skate Canada International

The 2001 Skate America was the first event of six in the 2001–02 ISU Grand Prix of Figure Skating, a senior-level international invitational competition series. It was held at the World Arena in Colorado Springs, Colorado on October 24–28. Medals were awarded in the disciplines of men's singles, ladies' singles, pair skating, and ice dancing. Skaters earned points toward qualifying for the 2001–02 Grand Prix Final.

== Results ==
=== Men ===
Rank	Name	Nation	TFP	SP	FS
1	Timothy Goebel	United States	1.5	1	1
2	Takeshi Honda	Japan	3.5	3	2
3	Alexander Abt	Russia	4.0	2	3
4	Michael Weiss	United States	7.5	7	4
5	Ilia Klimkin	Russia	7.5	5	5
6	Matt Savoie	United States	9.0	4	7
7	Li Chengjiang	China	10.0	8	6
8	Ben Ferreira	Canada	11.0	6	8
9	Brian Joubert	France	14.0	10	9
10	Silvio Smalun	Germany	15.5	9	11
11	Fedor Andreev	Canada	16.0	12	10
12	Kensuke Nakaniwa	Japan	17.5	11	12

=== Ladies ===
Rank	Name	Nation	TFP	SP	FS
1	Michelle Kwan	United States	1.5	1	1
2	Sarah Hughes	United States	3.0	2	2
3	Viktoria Volchkova	Russia	4.5	3	3
4	Shizuka Arakawa	Japan	7.0	6	4
5	Sasha Cohen	United States	7.0	4	5
6	Júlia Sebestyén	Hungary	8.5	5	6
7	Jennifer Robinson	Canada	10.5	7	7
8	Mikkeline Kierkgaard	Denmark	13.0	8	9
9	Utako Wakamatsu	Japan	13.5	11	8
10	Elena Sokolova	Russia	14.5	9	10
11	Vanessa Giunchi	Italy	16.0	10	11

=== Pairs ===
Rank	Name	Nation	TFP	SP	FS
1	Jamie Salé / David Pelletier	Canada	1.5	1	1
2	Kyoko Ina / John Zimmerman	United States	3.0	2	2
3	Tatiana Totmianina / Maxim Marinin	Russia	4.5	3	3
4	Julia Obertas / Alexei Sokolov	Russia	6.5	5	4
5	Danielle Hartsell / Steve Hartsell	United States	8.0	6	5
6	Yuko Kawaguchi / Alexander Markuntsov	Japan	10.0	8	6
7	Valerie Saurette / Jean Sebastien Fecteau	Canada	10.0	4	8
8	Laura Handy / Jonathon Hunt	United States	10.5	7	7
9	Natalya Ponomareva / Evgeni Sviridov	Uzbekistan	13.5	9	9

=== Ice dancing ===
Rank	Name	Nation	TFP	CD	OD	FD
1	Shae Lynne Bourne / Victor Kraatz	Canada	2.0	1	1	1
2	Galit Chait / Sergei Sakhnovsky	Israel	5.0	3	3	2
3	Margarita Drobiazko / Povilas Vanagas	Lithuania	5.0	2	2	3
4	Tatiana Navka / Roman Kostomarov	Russia	8.0	4	4	4
5	Tanith Belbin / Benjamin Agosto	United States	10.0	5	5	5
6	Megan Wing / Aaron Lowe	Canada	12.4	7	6	6
7	Magali Sauri / Michael Stifunin	France	13.6	6	7	7
8	Jessica Joseph / Brandon Forsyth	United States	16.0	8	8	8
9	Jill Vernekohl / Dmitri Kurakin	Germany	18.0	9	9	9
10	Nakako Tsuzuki / Rinat Farkhoutdinov	Japan	20.0	10	10	10
