= Hartsell =

Hartsell is a surname. Notable people with the surname include:

- Danielle Hartsell (born 1980), American pair skater
- Fletcher L. Hartsell Jr. (born 1947), American politician
- Harry Hartsell (1890–1955), American football, basketball and baseball player, coach and athletics administrator
- Mark Hartsell (born 1973), American football player
- Steve Hartsell (born 1978), American pair skater
