= 2002 Skate America =

- Type: Grand Prix
- Date: October 23 – 27
- Season: 2002–03
- Location: Spokane, Washington
- Venue: Spokane Arena

Champions
- Men's singles: (France) Brian Joubert
- Ladies' singles: (United States) Michelle Kwan
- Pairs: (Russia) Tatiana Totmianina / Maxim Marinin
- Ice dance: (Ukraine) Elena Grushina / Ruslan Goncharov
- Previous: 2001 Skate America
- Next: 2003 Skate America
- Next GP: 2002 Skate Canada International

The 2002 Skate America was the first event of six in the 2002–03 ISU Grand Prix of Figure Skating, a senior-level international invitational competition series. It was held at the Spokane Arena in Spokane, Washington on October 23–27. Medals were awarded in the disciplines of men's singles, ladies' singles, pair skating, and ice dancing. Skaters earned points toward qualifying for the 2002–03 Grand Prix Final. The compulsory dance was the Austrian Waltz.

== Results ==
=== Men ===
Reigning Olympic champion Alexei Yagudin withdrew with injury after the short program in what became the final competition of his amateur career. Brian Joubert went on to win the event for his first international title.

Rank	Name	Nation	TFP	SP	FS
1	Brian Joubert	France	2.0	2	1
2	Alexander Abt	Russia	3.5	3	2
3	Matthew Savoie	United States	6.0	6	3
4	Zhang Min	China	6.0	4	4
5	Michael Weiss	United States	8.5	5	6
6	Emanuel Sandhu	Canada	9.5	9	5
7	Vakhtang Murvanidze	Georgia	12.0	10	7
8	Derrick Delmore	United States	12.0	8	8
9	Sergei Davydov	Belarus	12.5	7	9
10	Kensuke Nakaniwa	Japan	15.5	11	10
WD	Alexei Yagudin	Russia		1	

=== Ladies ===
Yukari Nakano and Ludmila Nelidina both landed a triple Axel in their free skating, together becoming the first female skaters to perform the jump in international competition since Midori Ito landed it at the 1992 Winter Olympics. Nakano landed it first and Nelidina, who skated after her, also performed it successfully.

Rank	Name	Nation	TFP	SP	FS
1	Michelle Kwan	United States	1.5	1	1
2	Ann Patrice McDonough	United States	5.0	6	2
3	Elena Liashenko	Ukraine	5.0	4	3
4	Jennifer Kirk	United States	6.0	2	5
5	Ludmila Nelidina	Russia	6.5	5	4
6	Viktoria Volchkova	Russia	8.5	3	7
7	Yukari Nakano	Japan	10.0	8	6
8	Júlia Sebestyén	Hungary	12.5	7	9
9	Miriam Manzano	Australia	13.0	10	8
10	Annie Bellemare	Canada	14.5	9	10
11	Zuzana Babiaková	Slovakia	17.0	12	11
12	Elina Kettunen	Finland	17.5	11	12

=== Pairs ===
Rank	Name	Nation	TFP	SP	FS
1	Tatiana Totmianina / Maxim Marinin	Russia	1.5	1	1
2	Anabelle Langlois / Patrice Archetto	Canada	3.5	3	2
3	Pang Qing / Tong Jian	China	4.0	2	3
4	Zhang Dan / Zhang Hao	China	6.0	4	4
5	Yuko Kawaguchi / Alexander Markuntsov	Japan	7.5	5	5
6	Tiffany Scott / Philip Dulebohn	United States	9.0	6	6
7	Kathryn Orscher / Garrett Lucash	United States	10.5	7	7
8	Tatiana Chuvaeva / Dmitri Palamarchuk	Ukraine	12.0	8	8
9	Kristen Roth / Michael McPherson	United States	13.5	9	9

=== Ice dancing ===
Rank	Name	Nation	TFP	CD	OD	FD
1	Elena Grushina / Ruslan Goncharov	Ukraine	2.0	1	1	1
2	Tatiana Navka / Roman Kostomarov	Russia	4.0	2	2	2
3	Tanith Belbin / Benjamin Agosto	United States	6.0	3	3	3
4	Galit Chait / Sergei Sakhnovski	Israel	8.0	4	4	4
5	Melissa Gregory / Denis Petukhov	United States	10.0	5	5	5
6	Kristin Fraser / Igor Lukanin	Azerbaijan	12.0	6	6	6
7	Emilie Nussear / Mathew Gates	United States	14.0	7	7	7
8	Nozomi Watanabe / Akiyuki Kido	Japan	16.0	8	8	8
9	Josée Piché / Pascal Denis	Canada	18.0	9	9	9
