= Broadmoor World Arena (1998) =

Arena in Colorado Springs

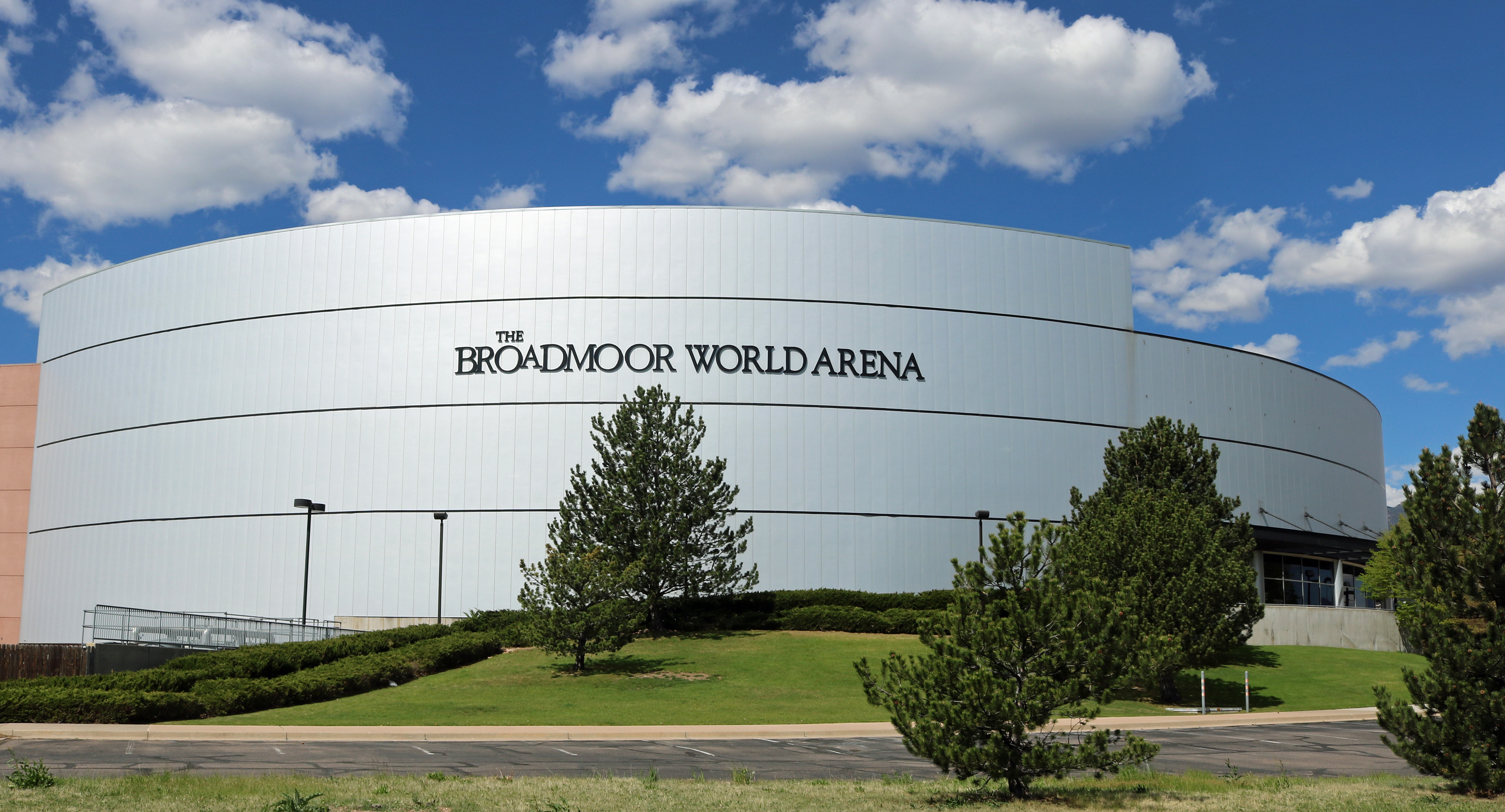
- The east side of the arena's exterior.
- Interactive map of Broadmoor World Arena
- Former names: Colorado Springs World Arena (1998–2014)
- Address: 3185 Venetucci Boulevard
- Location: Colorado Springs, Colorado, U.S.
- Coordinates: 38°47′18″N 104°47′39″W
- Owner: CSWA
- Operator: AEG / ASM Global
- Capacity: 7,750 (hockey); 8,099 (basketball); 9,000 (concert)
- Surface: 200' x 100' (hockey)

Construction
- Groundbreaking: June 1, 1996
- Opened: January 16, 1998
- Cost: $58.8 million (entire complex) ($116 million in 2025 dollars)
- Architects: HOK Sport; James W. Nakai and Associates
- Structural engineer: Walter P. Moore
- Services engineers: M–E Engineers, Inc.
- General contractor: GE Johnson Construction Company

Tenants
- Broadmoor Skating Club; Colorado College Tigers (NCAA) (1998–2021); Colorado Gold Kings (WCHL) (1998–2002)

Website
- broadmoorworldarena.com

The Broadmoor World Arena (originally known as the Colorado Springs World Arena) in Colorado Springs, Colorado, United States, is an 8,000 seat multi-purpose arena and entertainment venue. The arena opened in 1998. In addition to the main arena, the adjacent Ice Hall contains two practice rinks, one NHL-sized and one Olympic-sized.

The facility is home to world-class concerts and events, the Broadmoor Skating Club (BSC), numerous elite figure skaters, and the Colorado Gold Speedskating Club. It was home to the US National Short Track Speedskating Team until the summer of 2007 when the team moved to Utah Olympic Oval. The World Arena also manages the Pikes Peak Center, a performing arts center located in downtown Colorado Springs.

The building serves as a replacement for the original Broadmoor World Arena, which opened in 1938. Demolished in 1994, it was the former home of the BSC and Colorado College hockey programs and site of the first ten NCAA hockey championships.

== History ==
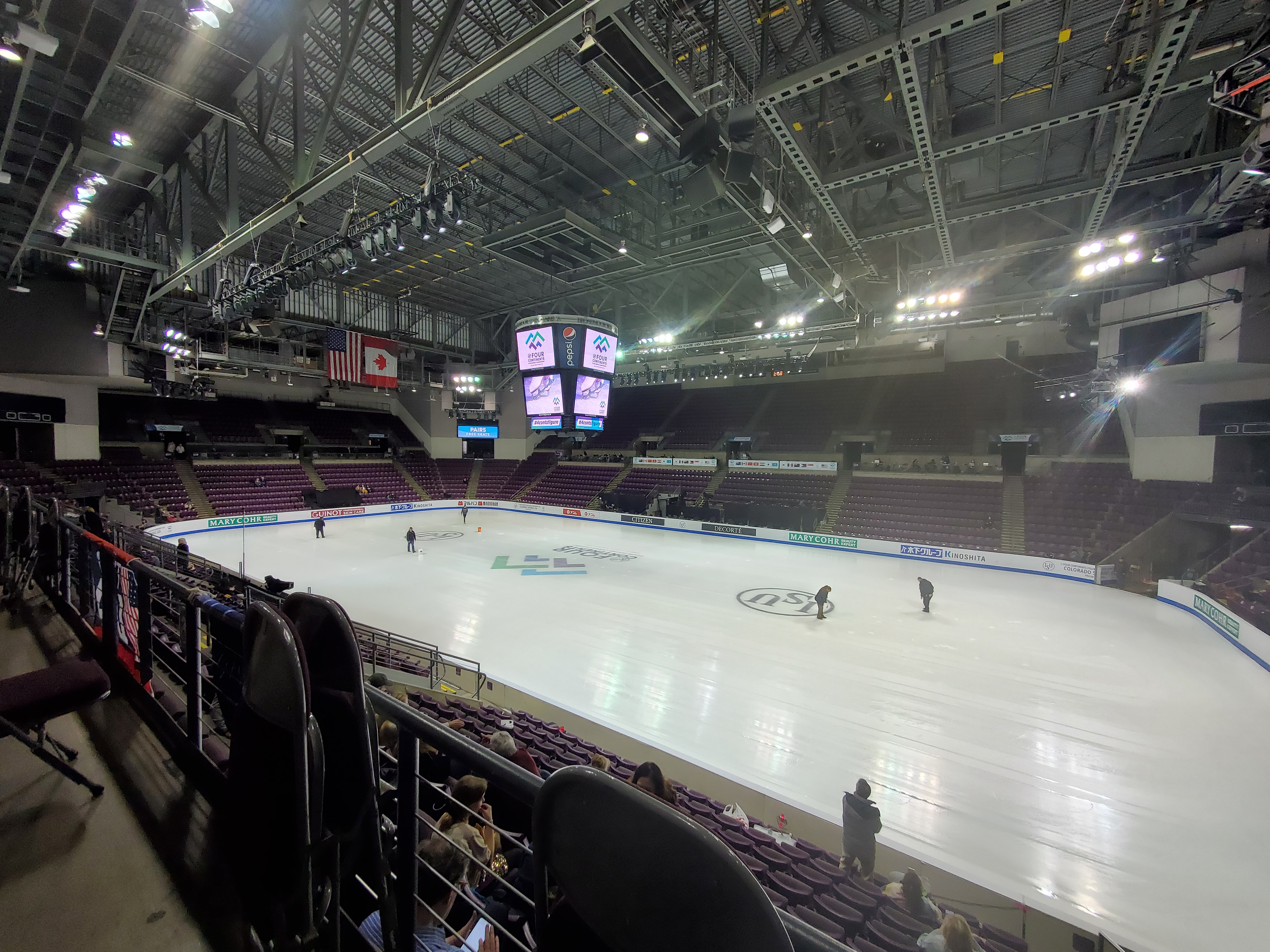
Interior in 2023

It was originally named the Colorado Springs World Arena. However, in April 2014, after an agreement with the Anschutz Entertainment Group, owners of The Broadmoor resort, it was formally renamed the Broadmoor World Arena.

The arena hosted the 1999, 2000, and 2001 editions of Skate America.

From 2001 to 2005, the PBR, which at the time was headquartered in Colorado Springs, hosted a Bud Light Cup (now the Unleash the Beast Series) event at this venue. After 2005, the PBR's headquarters relocated to Pueblo, Colorado, thus halting the production of this event. However, this event was brought back to the World Arena in 2014 after a 9-year hiatus (though the PBR is still headquartered in Pueblo).

Prior to the opening of Ed Robson Arena in 2021, the arena hosted the Colorado College Tigers men's ice hockey team of the NCHC.
