= Aleksandr Pavlov =

Aleksandr Pavlov may refer to:

- Aleksandr Pavlov (wrestler) (born 1973), Belarusian wrestler
- Aleksandr Pavlov (politician), Kazakhstani politician, deputy leader in Nur Otan
- Aleksandr Pavlov (speedway rider), Soviet speedway racer
- Alexander Pavlov (figure skater) (born 1977), Australian figure skater
- Alyaksandr Pawlaw (born 1984), Belarusian international footballer
