= 1996 Skate America =

- Type: Champions Series
- Date: October 31 – November 3
- Season: 1996–97
- Location: Springfield, Massachusetts
- Host: U.S. Figure Skating
- Venue: Springfield Civic Center

Champions
- Men's singles: (United States) Todd Eldredge
- Ladies' singles: (United States) Michelle Kwan
- Pairs: (Russia) Oksana Kazakova / Artur Dmitriev
- Ice dance: (Russia) Anjelika Krylova / Oleg Ovsiannikov
- Previous: 1995 Skate America
- Next: 1997 Skate America
- Next GP: 1996 Skate Canada International

The 1996 Skate America was the first event of six in the 1996–97 ISU Champions Series, a senior-level international invitational competition series. It was held at the Springfield Civic Center in Springfield, Massachusetts on October 31 – November 3. Medals were awarded in the disciplines of men's singles, ladies' singles, pair skating, and ice dancing. Skaters earned points towards qualifying for the 1996–97 Champions Series Final.

== Results ==
=== Men ===
Rank	Name	Nation	TFP	SP	FS
1	Todd Eldredge	United States	1.5	1	1
2	Alexei Urmanov	Russia	3.0	2	2
3	Alexei Yagudin	Russia	6.0	6	3
4	Viacheslav Zagorodniuk	Ukraine	6.0	4	4
5	Éric Millot	France	7.5	5	5
6	Takeshi Honda	Japan	7.5	3	6
7	Scott Davis	United States	11.0	8	7
8	Cornel Gheorghe	Romania	13.0	10	8
9	Dan Hollander	United States	13.5	7	10
10	Michael Hopfes	Germany	15.0	12	9
11	Stanick Jeannette	France	15.5	9	11
12	Jeffrey Langdon	Canada	17.5	11	12

=== Ladies ===
Rank	Name	Nation	TFP	SP	FS
1	Michelle Kwan	United States	1.5	1	1
2	Tonia Kwiatkowski	United States	3.0	2	2
3	Sydne Vogel	United States	4.5	3	3
4	Julia Lautowa	Austria	6.5	5	4
5	Hanae Yokoya	Japan	8.0	4	6
6	Elena Sokolova	Russia	9.5	9	5
7	Vanessa Gusmeroli	France	11.0	8	7
8	Lenka Kulovaná	Czech Republic	12.0	6	9
9	Szusanna Szwed	Poland	13.0	10	8
10	Maria Butyrskaya	Russia	13.5	7	10
11	Fanny Cagnard	France	17.0	12	11
12	Jennifer Robinson	Canada	17.5	11	12

=== Pairs ===
Rank	Name	Nation	TFP	SP	FS
1	Oksana Kazakova / Artur Dmitriev	Russia	2.0	2	1
2	Shelby Lyons / Brian Wells	United States	2.5	1	2
3	Stephanie Stiegler / John Zimmerman	United States	5.0	4	3
4	Marina Khaltourina / Andrei Krioukov	Kazakhstan	5.5	3	4
5	Silvia Dimitrov / Rico Rex	Germany	7.5	5	5
6	Sara Ward / Lance Travis	United States	9.5	7	6
7	Marie-Claude Savard-Gagnon / Luc Bradet	Canada	10.0	6	7

=== Ice dancing ===
Rank	Name	Nation	TFP	CD	OD	FD
1	Anjelika Krylova / Oleg Ovsiannikov	Russia	2.0	1	1	1
2	Irina Lobacheva / Ilia Averbukh	Russia	4.0	2	2	2
3	Sophie Moniotte / Pascal Lavanchy	France	6.0	3	3	3
4	Elizabeth Punsalan / Jerod Swallow	United States	9.0	5	5	4
5	Irina Romanova / Igor Yaroshenko	Ukraine	9.0	4	4	5
6	Kati Winkler / René Lohse	Germany	12.0	6	6	6
7	Kateřina Mrázová / Martin Šimeček	Czech Republic	14.0	7	7	7
8	Megan Wing / Aaron Lowe	Canada	16.4	9	8	8
9	Kate Robinson / Peter Breen	United States	19.2	12	9	9
10	Barbara Piton / Alexandre Piton	France	20.6	10	11	10
11	Amy Webster / Ron Kravette	United States	21.4	11	10	11
WD	Elizaveta Stekolnikova / Dmitri Kazarlyga	Kazakhstan		8		
