= Victoria Maksyuta =

Russian-Ukrainian figure skater (born 1981)

Viktoriya Maksyuta
Personal information
- Native name: Вікторія Олександрівна Максюта
- Full name: Viktoriya Oleksandrivna Maksyuta
- Other names: Victoria Maxiuta/Maksiuta
- Born: 15 November 1981 (age 44) Kyiv, Ukrainian SSR, Soviet Union
- Height: 1.58 m (5 ft 2 in)

Figure skating career
- Country: Ukraine; Russia
- Skating club: Dynamo Kyiv
- Began skating: 1984
- Retired: 2002
Medal record
Representing Russia
Figure skating: Pairs
Winter Universiade
Gold medal – first place	1999 Žilina	Pairs
World Junior Championships
Gold medal – first place	1996 Brisbane	Pairs
Bronze medal – third place	1997 Seoul	Pairs
Bronze medal – third place	1998 Saint John	Pairs
Bronze medal – third place	1999 Zagreb	Pairs
Junior Grand Prix Final
Silver medal – second place	1997–98 Lausanne	Pairs
Bronze medal – third place	1998–99 Detroit	Pairs

Viktoriya Oleksandrivna Maksyuta or Victoria Maxiuta (Ukrainian: Вікторія Олександрівна Максюта; born 15 November 1981) is a former pair skater. Competing with Vladislav Zhovnirski for Russia, she became the 1996 World Junior champion, 1997 Ondrej Nepela Memorial champion, 1998 Skate America bronze medalist, and 1999 Winter Universiade champion. She later represented Russia and Ukraine with Vitali Dubina.

== Career ==
=== Partnership with Zhovnirski ===
Maxiuta began appearing internationally with Vladislav Zhovnirski in 1993, representing Russia. They were awarded gold at the 1996 World Junior Championships, held from November to December 1995 in Brisbane, Australia.

The pair's first senior international medal, gold, came at the Ondrej Nepela Memorial in September 1996. Maxiuta/Zhovnirski went on to take bronze at the 1997 World Junior Championships, held in November 1996 in Seoul, South Korea; bronze at the 1998 World Junior Championships in December 1997 in Saint John, New Brunswick, Canada; and silver at the 1997–98 Junior Series Final in March 1998 in Lausanne, Switzerland.

Maxiuta/Zhovnirski began the 1998–99 season with gold medals at both of their Junior Grand Prix assignments – in Sofia, Bulgaria, and Chemnitz, Germany – before winning bronze at a senior Grand Prix event, the 1998 Skate America. In November 1998, the pair stepped onto the World Junior Championship podium for the fourth consecutive year, taking bronze in Zagreb, Croatia. In January 1999, they outscored Pang Qing / Tong Jian for gold at the Winter Universiade in Žilina, Slovakia. In March, they took bronze at the Junior Grand Prix Final in Detroit. The pair was coached by Nina Mozer.

=== Partnership with Dubina ===
In the 1999–2000 season, Maxiuta competed with Vitali Dubina for Russia. They were awarded gold at the 1999 Ondrej Nepela Memorial and bronze at the 1999 Golden Spin of Zagreb before placing sixth at the 2000 Russian Championships.

Deciding to switch to Ukraine, the pair won two consecutive silver medals at the Ukrainian Championships and competed at two Grand Prix events, placing 8th at the 2001 Sparkassen Cup on Ice and 6th at the 2001 Cup of Russia. They were coached by Dmitri Shkidchenko in Kyiv.

== Programs ==
With Dubina

Season	Short program	Free skating
2001–02	Love Story by Francis Lai	Polovtsian Dances (from Prince Igor) by Alexander Borodin performed by the London Orchestra

== Competitive highlights ==
GP: Grand Prix; JGP: Junior Grand Prix

=== With Dubina for Ukraine and Russia ===
International
Event	1999–00 (RUS)	2000–01 (UKR)	2001–02 (UKR)
GP Cup of Russia			6th
GP Sparkassen Cup			8th
Golden Spin	3rd		
Nebelhorn Trophy			7th
Nepela Memorial	1st		
Tallinn Cup	2nd		
National
Ukrainian Champ.		2nd	2nd
Russian Champ.	6th		

=== With Zhovnirski for Russia ===
International
Event	93–94	95–96	96–97	97–98	98–99
GP Skate America					3rd
Nebelhorn Trophy		9th		WD	
Nepela Memorial			1st		
Winter Universiade					1st
International: Junior
Junior Worlds		1st	3rd	3rd	3rd
JGP Final				2nd	3rd
JGP Bulgaria					1st
JGP Germany					1st
JGP Hungary				3rd	
JGP Slovakia				1st	
Blue Swords		3rd J	2nd		
St. Gervais			2nd		
Ukrainian Souvenir	6th J				
National
Russian Champ.		8th	7th		6th
WD: Withdrew
