= Alexander Pavlov (figure skater) =

Russian ice dancer

Personal information
- Born: 22 December 1977 (age 48) Kuybyshev
- Height: 1.76 m (5 ft 9 1/2 in)

Figure skating career
- Country: Australia; Russia
- Began skating: 1982

Alexander Pavlov (born 22 December 1977) is a Russian ice dancer. He competed with his twin sister, Elena, until 1999, and then skated with Nina Ulanova for two years, representing Russia. He later skated for Australia with Danika Bourne, competing at two Four Continents Championships. He is the brother-in-law of Alexander Abt.

== Competitive highlights ==
=== With Bourne ===
International
Event	2002–2003	2003–2004	2004–2005
Four Continents		13th	17th
Nebelhorn Trophy			7th
Ondrej Nepela Memorial			4th
Karl Schäfer Memorial		11th	
National
Australian Championships	2nd	2nd	2nd

=== With Ulanova ===
International
Event	1999–2000	2000–2001
GP Skate America		11th
Nebelhorn Trophy		10th
Tallinn Cup	2nd	
National
Russian Championships	4th	
GP = Grand Prix

=== With Pavlova ===
International
Event	1996–1997	1997–1998	1998–1999
Junior Worlds	11th		
Junior Series, Germany		5th	
Int. St. Gervais	7th		
Polish FSA Trophy	5th J.		
National
Russian Championships			8th
J. = Junior level
