= Vladimir Fedorov =

Russian ice dancer

Personal information
- Full name: Vladimir Anatolyevich Fedorov
- Other names: Vladimir Fyodorov
- Born: 22 April 1971 (age 55) Moscow, Russian SFSR, Soviet Union
- Height: 1.85 m (6 ft 1 in)

Figure skating career
- Country: Russia
- Retired: 1998
Medal record
Figure skating: Ice dancing
Representing Russia
World Championships
| Bronze medal – third place | 1993 Prague | Ice dancing |

Vladimir Anatolyevich Fedorov or Fyodorov (Russian: Владимир Анатольевич Фёдоров, born 22 April 1971) is a Russian former competitive ice dancer. He is the 1993 World bronze medalist with Anjelika Krylova. He is now married and lives in the USA in Washington. He coaches at SnoKing Ice Arena in Snoqualmie, WA.

== Career ==
Fedorov originally competed for the Soviet Union with partner Liudmila Berezova. They won the silver medal at the 1989 World Junior Championships.

When that partnership ended, he teamed up with Anjelika Krylova. They took the bronze medal at the 1993 World Championships. They competed at the 1994 Winter Olympics and placed 6th. Their partnership ended following that season.

Fedorov teamed up with Anna Semenovich in 1995. They won the Finlandia Trophy twice and competed on the Grand Prix of Figure Skating. The highlight of their partnership was competing at the 1998 World Championships, where they placed 15th.

Fedorov retired after that and began working as a coach. He has worked with Melinda Wang.

He has also worked with Isabelle Inthisone

== Results ==
GP = Part of Champions Series from 1995; renamed Grand Prix in 1998

=== With Semenovich ===
International
| Event | 1995–96 | 1996–97 | 1997–98 | 1998–99 |
|---|---|---|---|---|
| World Championships | | | 15th | |
| GP Cup of Russia | | | 4th | |
| GP NHK Trophy | 3rd | 7th | | |
| GP Skate America | | | 3rd | 4th |
| GP Skate Canada | | 6th | | |
| GP Trophée Lalique | | | | 4th |
| Finlandia Trophy | | 1st | 1st | |
| Centennial On Ice | 6th | | | |
| Lysiane Lauret Challenge | | 2nd | | |
| Autumn Trophy | | 3rd | | |
National
| Russian Championships | | | 3rd | 4th |

=== With Krylova ===
International
| Event | 1991–92 | 1992–93 | 1993–94 |
|---|---|---|---|
| Winter Olympics | | | 6th |
| World Championships | | 3rd | WD |
| European Championships | | 4th | 6th |
| International de Paris | 1st | | |
| Nations Cup | | 1st | |
| NHK Trophy | | 2nd | |
National
| Russian Championships | | 1st | 1st |
| Soviet Championships | 2nd | | |
WD = Withdrew

=== With Berezova ===
International
| Event | 1988–89 | 1989–90 |
|---|---|---|
| Karl Schäfer Memorial | | 1st |
International: Junior
| World Junior Championships | 2nd | |
