= Skate America =

International figure skating competition

- Status: Active
- Genre: Grand Prix competition
- Frequency: Annual
- Country: United States
- Inaugurated: 1979
- Previous event: 2026 Skate America
- Next event: 2027 Skate America
- Organizer: U.S. Figure Skating

Skate America is an annual figure skating competition sanctioned by the International Skating Union (ISU), organized and hosted by U.S. Figure Skating. The first Skate America was held in 1979 in Lake Placid, New York, as a test event for the 1980 Winter Olympics. When the ISU launched the Champions Series (later renamed the Grand Prix Series) in 1995, Skate America was one of the five qualifying events. It has been a Grand Prix event every year since.

Medals are awarded in men's singles, women's singles, pair skating, and ice dance. Skaters earn points based on their results at the qualifying competitions each season, and the top skaters or teams in each discipline are then invited to compete at the Grand Prix of Figure Skating Final. Todd Eldredge of the United States currently holds the record for the most wins in men's singles (with five), while Michelle Kwan, also of the United States, holds the record in women's singles (with seven). Marina Eltsova and Andrei Bushkov of Russia hold the record in pair skating (with five), while Tanith Belbin and Benjamin Agosto, and Madison Chock and Evan Bates, both of the United States, are tied for holding the most records in ice dance (with five each).

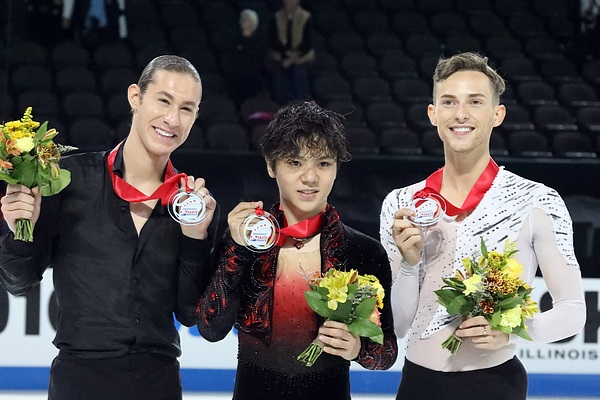
The gold, silver, and bronze medalists in the men's event in 2016: Shoma Uno of Japan (center), Jason Brown of the United States (left), and Adam Rippon of the United States (right)

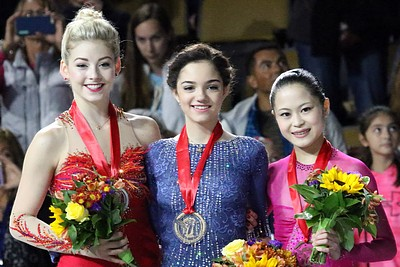
The gold, silver, and bronze medalists in the women's event in 2015: Evgenia Medvedeva of Russia (center), Gracie Gold of the United States (left), and Satoko Miyahara of Japan (right)

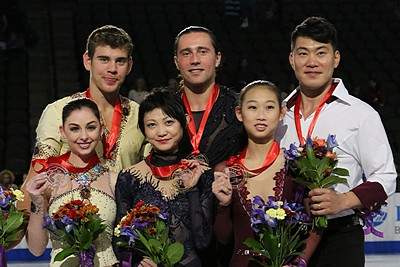
The gold, silver, and bronze medalists in the pairs event in 2014: Yuko Kavaguti and Alexander Smirnov of Russia (center), Haven Denney and Brandon Frazier of the United States (left), and Peng Cheng and Zhang Hao of China (right)

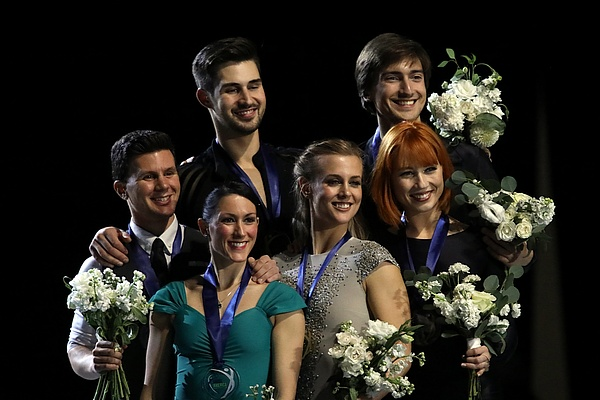
The gold, silver, and bronze medalists in the ice dance event in 2018: Madison Hubbell and Zachary Donohue of the United States (center), Charlène Guignard and Marco Fabbri of Italy (left), and Tiffany Zahorski and Jonathan Guerreiro of Russia (right)

== History ==
Between 1923 and 1971, the Canadian Figure Skating Association and the U.S. Figure Skating Association co-hosted the North American Figure Skating Championships. At this time, medal contenders at the World Figure Skating Championships and the Winter Olympics came from either Europe or North America. The North American Championships allowed Canadian and American skaters the opportunity to compete at a comparable event to the European Figure Skating Championships. The championships were held every other year, with Canada and the United States alternating as hosts, and only skaters from Canada and the United States were eligible to compete.

At a planning meeting held in April 1972 and attended by representatives from both the Canadian and American skating federations, the Canadian delegation announced Canada's plans to withdraw from the North American Championships. With one of the two participating nations out, this effectively marked the end of the championships. The U.S. delegation was unaware at the time that the Canadian Figure Skating Association was already in the planning stages of launching their own international skating competition: Skate Canada.

The first iteration of Skate America – then called the Norton Skate – was held at the Olympic Center Arena in 1979 in Lake Placid, New York, and was the test event for the 1980 Winter Olympics. Test events are held prior to the Olympics to test the readiness and infrastructure of the venues to be used. Scott Hamilton and Lisa-Marie Allen, both of the United States, won the inaugural men's and women's events, respectively. Sabine Baeß and Tassilo Thierbach of East Germany won the pairs event, and Krisztina Regőczy and András Sallay of Hungary won the ice dance event.

Beginning with the 1995–96 season, the International Skating Union (ISU) launched the Champions Series – later renamed the Grand Prix Series – which, at its inception, consisted of five qualifying competitions and the Champions Series Final. This allowed skaters the chance to perfect their programs earlier in the season, as well as compete against the skaters whom they would later encounter at the World Figure Skating Championships. This series also provided the viewing public with additional televised skating, which had been in demand. The five qualifying competitions during this inaugural season were the Nations Cup, the NHK Trophy, the Skate America, the Skate Canada, and the Trophée de France. Skaters earned points based on their results in their respective competitions and the top skaters or teams in each discipline were then invited to compete at the Champions Series Final.

Due to the ongoing COVID-19 pandemic, modifications were made to the structure of the 2020 Skate America. The competitors consisted only of skaters from the United States, skaters already training in the United States, and skaters assigned to the event for geographic reasons. On September 25, U.S. Figure Skating announced that Skate America would be held without spectators. Attendees at the competition remained in a bubble – that is, in a cluster made up exclusively of individuals who have been thoroughly tested and unlikely to spread infection, "quarantined from the population of the city of Las Vegas" – throughout the duration of the event.

== Medalists ==
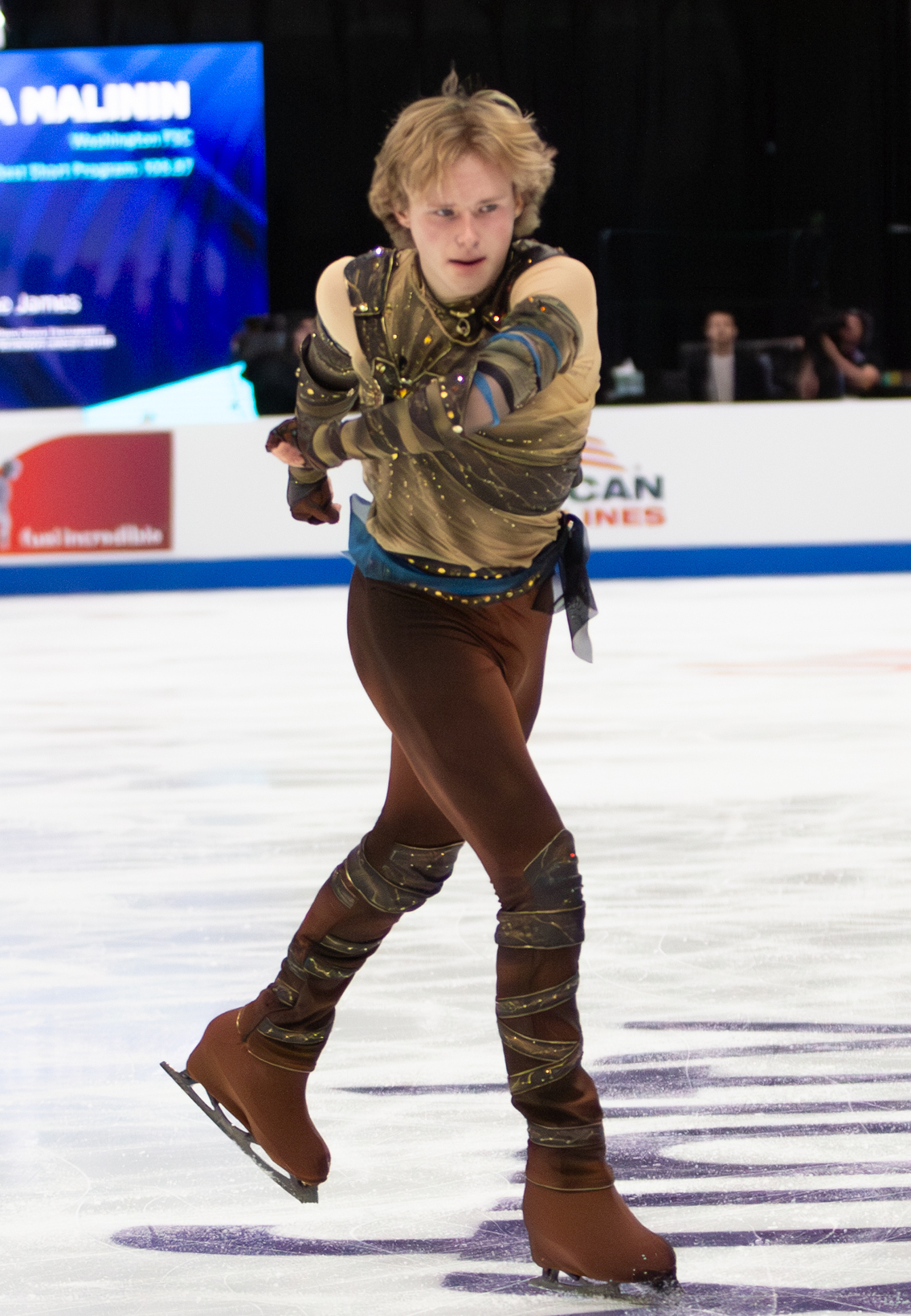
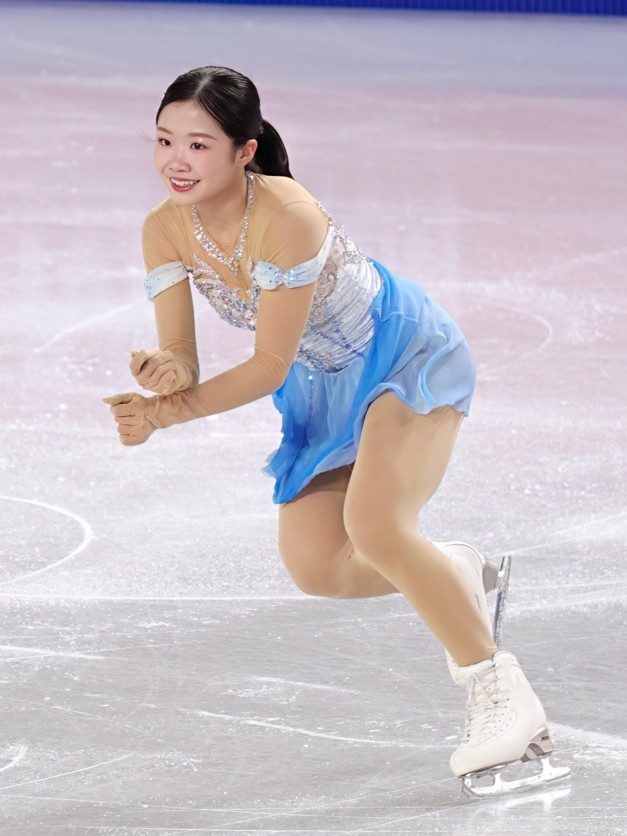
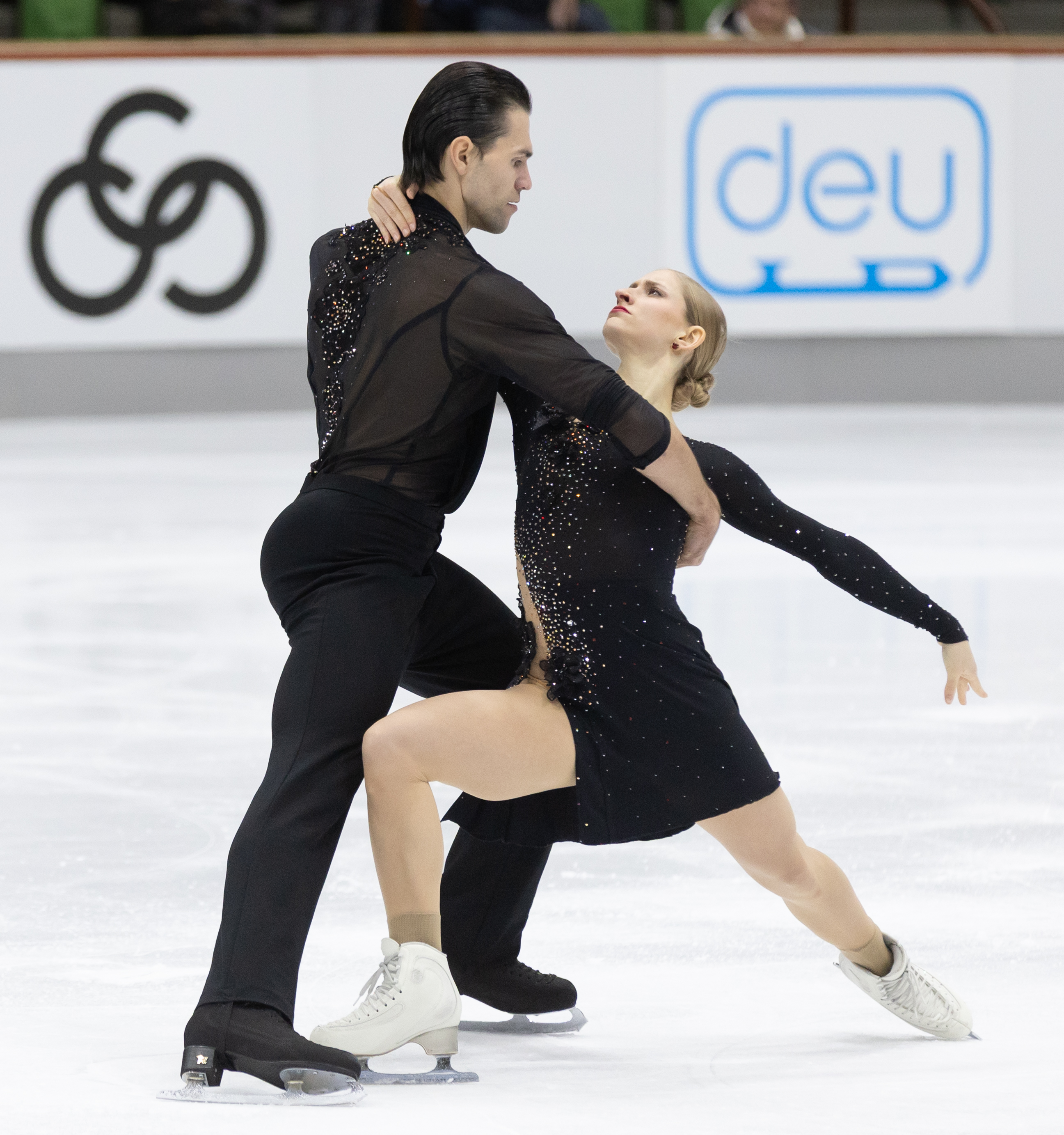
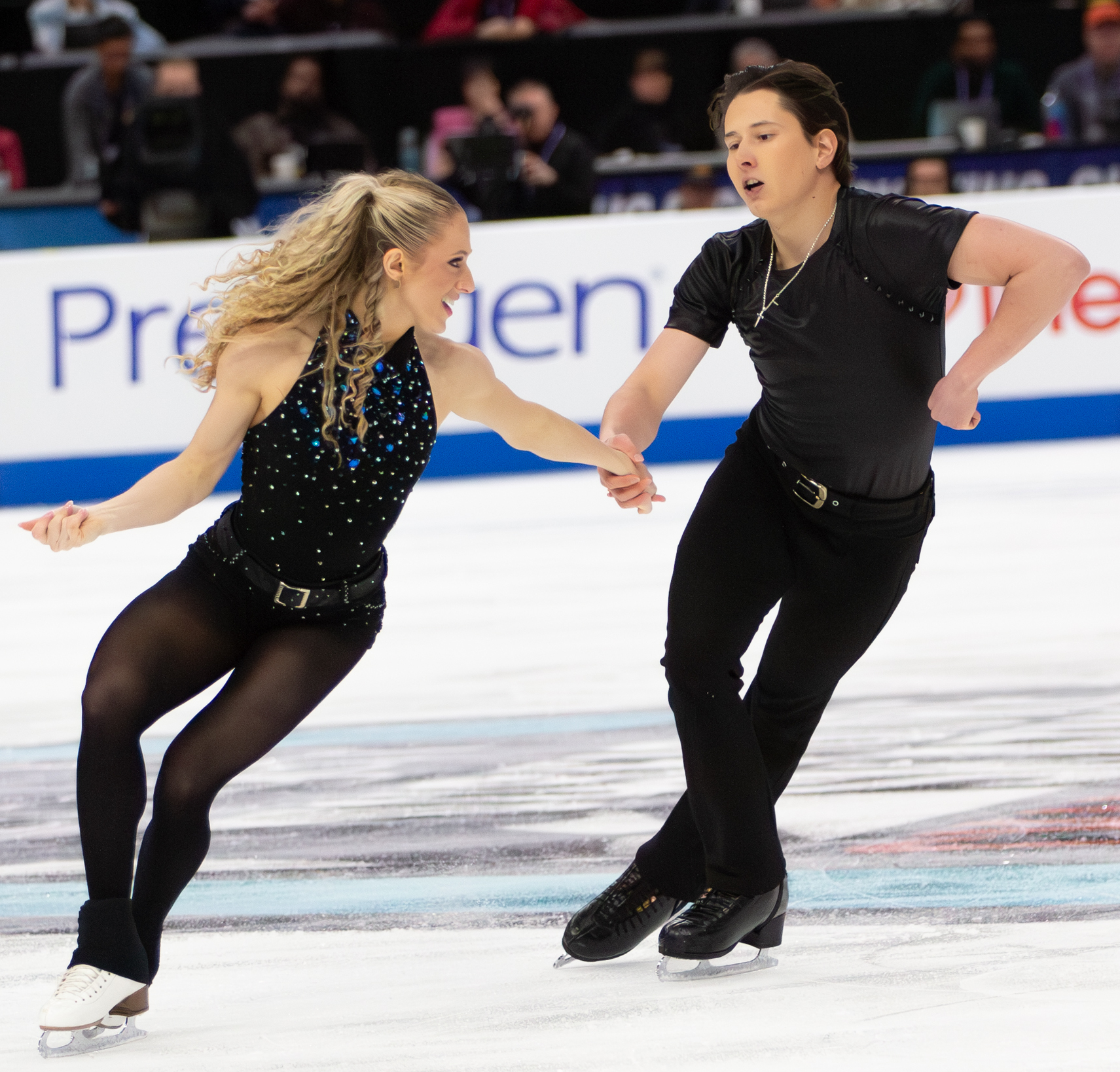
The reigning Skate America champions (from left to right): Ilia Malinin of the United States (men's singles); Ami Nakai of Japan (women's singles); Minerva Fabienne Hase and Nikita Volodin of Germany (pair skating); and Emilea Zingas and Vadym Kolesnik of the United States (ice dance)

=== Men's singles ===
Men's event medalists
| Year | Location | Gold | Silver | Bronze | Ref. |
|---|---|---|---|---|---|
| 1979 | Lake Placid, New York | (United States) Scott Hamilton | (United States) Scott Cramer | (East Germany) Jan Hoffmann | |
| 1980 | No competition held | | | | |
| 1981 | Lake Placid, New York | (United States) Scott Hamilton | (United States) Robert Wagenhoffer | (United States) Brian Boitano | |
| 1982 | Lake Placid, New York | (United States) Scott Hamilton | (West Germany) Heiko Fischer | (Czechoslovakia) Jozef Sabovčík | |
| 1983 | Rochester, New York | (United States) Brian Boitano | (West Germany) Rudi Cerne | (United States) Bobby Beauchamp | |
| 1984 | No competition held | | | | |
| 1985 | Saint Paul, Minnesota | (Czechoslovakia) Jozef Sabovčík | (United States) Brian Boitano | (Soviet Union) Viktor Petrenko | |
| 1986 | Portland, Maine | (United States) Brian Boitano | (Soviet Union) Viktor Petrenko | (United States) Daniel Doran | |
| 1987 | No competition held | | | | |
| 1988 | Portland, Maine | (United States) Christopher Bowman | (United States) Daniel Doran | (United States) Todd Eldredge | |
| 1989 | Indianapolis, Indiana | (United States) Christopher Bowman | (Soviet Union) Viktor Petrenko | (Canada) Kurt Browning | |
| 1990 | Buffalo, New York | (Soviet Union) Viktor Petrenko | (United States) Christopher Bowman | (United States) Todd Eldredge | |
| 1991 | Oakland, California | (United States) Christopher Bowman | (Czech Republic) Petr Barna | (United States) Todd Eldredge | |
| 1992 | Atlanta, Georgia | (United States) Todd Eldredge | (United States) Scott Davis | (United States) Mark Mitchell | |
| 1993 | Dallas, Texas | (Ukraine) Viktor Petrenko | (United States) Brian Boitano | (Russia) Alexei Urmanov | |
| 1994 | Pittsburgh, Pennsylvania | (United States) Todd Eldredge | (France) Philippe Candeloro | (France) Éric Millot | |
| 1995 | Detroit, Michigan | (United States) Todd Eldredge | (United States) Michael Weiss | (Russia) Alexander Abt | |
| 1996 | Springfield, Massachusetts | (United States) Todd Eldredge | (Russia) Alexei Urmanov | (Russia) Alexei Yagudin | |
| 1997 | Detroit, Michigan | (United States) Todd Eldredge | (Russia) Evgeni Plushenko | (Russia) Alexander Abt | |
| 1998 | Detroit, Michigan | (Russia) Alexei Yagudin | (United States) Michael Weiss | (Russia) Alexei Urmanov | |
| 1999 | Colorado Springs, Colorado | (Russia) Alexei Yagudin | (United States) Timothy Goebel | (Canada) Elvis Stojko | |
| 2000 | Colorado Springs, Colorado | (United States) Timothy Goebel | (Russia) Alexei Yagudin | (United States) Todd Eldredge | |
| 2001 | Colorado Springs, Colorado | (United States) Timothy Goebel | (Japan) Takeshi Honda | (Russia) Alexander Abt | |
| 2002 | Spokane, Washington | (France) Brian Joubert | (Russia) Alexander Abt | (United States) Matthew Savoie | |
| 2003 | Reading, Pennsylvania | (United States) Michael Weiss | (Japan) Takeshi Honda | (China) Zhang Min | |
| 2004 | Pittsburgh, Pennsylvania | (France) Brian Joubert | (United States) Ryan Jahnke | (United States) Michael Weiss | |
| 2005 | Atlantic City, New Jersey | (Japan) Daisuke Takahashi | (United States) Evan Lysacek | (France) Brian Joubert | |
| 2006 | Hartford, Connecticut | (Japan) Nobunari Oda | (United States) Evan Lysacek | (France) Alban Préaubert | |
| 2007 | Reading, Pennsylvania | (Japan) Daisuke Takahashi | (United States) Evan Lysacek | (Canada) Patrick Chan | |
| 2008 | Everett, Washington | (Japan) Takahiko Kozuka | (United States) Johnny Weir | (United States) Evan Lysacek | |
| 2009 | Lake Placid, New York | (United States) Evan Lysacek | (Canada) Shawn Sawyer | (United States) Ryan Bradley | |
| 2010 | Portland, Oregon | (Japan) Daisuke Takahashi | (Japan) Nobunari Oda | (United States) Armin Mahbanoozadeh | |
| 2011 | Ontario, California | (Czech Republic) Michal Březina | (Belgium) Kevin van der Perren | (Japan) Takahiko Kozuka | |
| 2012 | Kent, Washington | (Japan) Takahiko Kozuka | (Japan) Yuzuru Hanyu | (Japan) Tatsuki Machida | |
| 2013 | Detroit, Michigan | (Japan) Tatsuki Machida | (United States) Adam Rippon | (United States) Max Aaron | |
| 2014 | Chicago, Illinois | (Japan) Tatsuki Machida | (United States) Jason Brown | (Canada) Nam Nguyen | |
| 2015 | Milwaukee, Wisconsin | (United States) Max Aaron | (Japan) Shoma Uno | (United States) Jason Brown | |
| 2016 | Chicago, Illinois | (Japan) Shoma Uno | (United States) Jason Brown | (United States) Adam Rippon | |
| 2017 | Lake Placid, New York | (United States) Nathan Chen | (United States) Adam Rippon | (Russia) Sergei Voronov | |
| 2018 | Everett, Washington | (United States) Nathan Chen | (Czech Republic) Michal Březina | (Russia) Sergei Voronov | |
| 2019 | Las Vegas, Nevada | (United States) Nathan Chen | (United States) Jason Brown | (Russia) Dmitri Aliev | |
| 2020 | Las Vegas, Nevada | (United States) Nathan Chen | (United States) Vincent Zhou | (Canada) Keegan Messing | |
| 2021 | Las Vegas, Nevada | (United States) Vincent Zhou | (Japan) Shoma Uno | (United States) Nathan Chen | |
| 2022 | Norwood, Massachusetts | (United States) Ilia Malinin | (Japan) Kao Miura | (South Korea) Cha Jun-hwan | |
| 2023 | Allen, Texas | (United States) Ilia Malinin | (France) Kévin Aymoz | (Japan) Shun Sato | |
| 2024 | Allen, Texas | (United States) Ilia Malinin | (France) Kévin Aymoz | (Japan) Kao Miura | |
| 2025 | Lake Placid, New York | (France) Kévin Aymoz | (Kazakhstan) Mikhail Shaidorov | (Japan) Kazuki Tomono | |
| 2026 | Everett, Washington | (United States) Ilia Malinin | (Italy) Daniel Grassl | (Israel) Tamir Kuperman | |

=== Women's singles ===
Women's event medalists
| Year | Location | Gold | Silver | Bronze | Ref. |
|---|---|---|---|---|---|
| 1979 | Lake Placid, New York | (United States) Lisa-Marie Allen | (Italy) Susanna Driano | (United States) Sandy Lenz | |
| 1980 | No competition held | | | | |
| 1981 | Lake Placid, New York | (United States) Vikki de Vries | (United States) Elaine Zayak | (Austria) Claudia Kristofics-Binder | |
| 1982 | Lake Placid, New York | (United States) Rosalynn Sumners | (West Germany) Claudia Leistner | (Finland) Kristiina Wegelius | |
| 1983 | Rochester, New York | (United States) Tiffany Chin | (United States) Jill Frost | (United States) Kelly Webster | |
| 1984 | No competition held | | | | |
| 1985 | Saint Paul, Minnesota | (United States) Debi Thomas | (Canada) Tracey Wainman | (Belgium) Katrien Pauwels | |
| 1986 | Portland, Maine | (United States) Tiffany Chin | (United States) Tonya Harding | (France) Agnès Gosselin | |
| 1987 | No competition held | | | | |
| 1988 | Portland, Maine | (West Germany) Claudia Leistner | (Japan) Midori Ito | (United States) Kristi Yamaguchi | |
| 1989 | Indianapolis, Indiana | (United States) Tonya Harding | (United States) Jill Trenary | (East Germany) Simone Lang | |
| 1990 | Buffalo, New York | (United States) Kristi Yamaguchi | (Japan) Midori Ito | (United States) Tonia Kwiatkowski | |
| 1991 | Oakland, California | (United States) Tonya Harding | (United States) Kristi Yamaguchi | (France) Surya Bonaly | |
| 1992 | Atlanta, Georgia | (Japan) Yuka Sato | (United States) Nancy Kerrigan | (China) Chen Lu | |
| 1993 | Dallas, Texas | (Ukraine) Oksana Baiul | (France) Surya Bonaly | (United States) Tonya Harding | |
| 1994 | Pittsburgh, Pennsylvania | (France) Surya Bonaly | (United States) Michelle Kwan | (Russia) Irina Slutskaya | |
| 1995 | Detroit, Michigan | (United States) Michelle Kwan | (China) Chen Lu | (Russia) Irina Slutskaya | |
| 1996 | Springfield, Massachusetts | (United States) Michelle Kwan | (United States) Tonia Kwiatkowski | (United States) Sydne Vogel | |
| 1997 | Detroit, Michigan | (United States) Michelle Kwan | (United States) Tara Lipinski | (Russia) Elena Sokolova | |
| 1998 | Detroit, Michigan | (Russia) Maria Butyrskaya | (Russia) Elena Sokolova | (United States) Angela Nikodinov | |
| 1999 | Colorado Springs, Colorado | (United States) Michelle Kwan | (Russia) Julia Soldatova | (Russia) Elena Sokolova | |
| 2000 | Colorado Springs, Colorado | (United States) Michelle Kwan | (United States) Sarah Hughes | (Russia) Elena Sokolova | |
| 2001 | Colorado Springs, Colorado | (United States) Michelle Kwan | (United States) Sarah Hughes | (Russia) Viktoria Volchkova | |
| 2002 | Spokane, Washington | (United States) Michelle Kwan | (United States) Ann Patrice McDonough | (Ukraine) Elena Liashenko | |
| 2003 | Reading, Pennsylvania | (United States) Sasha Cohen | (United States) Jennifer Kirk | (Japan) Shizuka Arakawa | |
| 2004 | Pittsburgh, Pennsylvania | (United States) Angela Nikodinov | (Canada) Cynthia Phaneuf | (Japan) Miki Ando | |
| 2005 | Atlantic City, New Jersey | (Russia) Elena Sokolova | (United States) Alissa Czisny | (Japan) Yoshie Onda | |
| 2006 | Hartford, Connecticut | (Japan) Miki Ando | (United States) Kimmie Meissner | (Japan) Mao Asada | |
| 2007 | Reading, Pennsylvania | (United States) Kimmie Meissner | (Japan) Miki Ando | (United States) Caroline Zhang | |
| 2008 | Everett, Washington | (South Korea) Yuna Kim | (Japan) Yukari Nakano | (Japan) Miki Ando | |
| 2009 | Lake Placid, New York | (South Korea) Yuna Kim | (United States) Rachael Flatt | (Hungary) Júlia Sebestyén | |
| 2010 | Portland, Oregon | (Japan) Kanako Murakami | (United States) Rachael Flatt | (Italy) Carolina Kostner | |
| 2011 | Ontario, California | (United States) Alissa Czisny | (Italy) Carolina Kostner | (Sweden) Viktoria Helgesson | |
| 2012 | Kent, Washington | (United States) Ashley Wagner | (United States) Christina Gao | (Russia) Adelina Sotnikova | |
| 2013 | Detroit, Michigan | (Japan) Mao Asada | (United States) Ashley Wagner | (Russia) Elena Radionova | |
| 2014 | Chicago, Illinois | (Russia) Elena Radionova | (Russia) Elizaveta Tuktamysheva | (United States) Gracie Gold | |
| 2015 | Milwaukee, Wisconsin | (Russia) Evgenia Medvedeva | (United States) Gracie Gold | (Japan) Satoko Miyahara | |
| 2016 | Chicago, Illinois | (United States) Ashley Wagner | (United States) Mariah Bell | (Japan) Mai Mihara | |
| 2017 | Lake Placid, New York | (Japan) Satoko Miyahara | (Japan) Kaori Sakamoto | (United States) Bradie Tennell | |
| 2018 | Everett, Washington | (Japan) Satoko Miyahara | (Japan) Kaori Sakamoto | (Russia) Sofia Samodurova | |
| 2019 | Las Vegas, Nevada | (Russia) Anna Shcherbakova | (United States) Bradie Tennell | (Russia) Elizaveta Tuktamysheva | |
| 2020 | Las Vegas, Nevada | (United States) Mariah Bell | (United States) Bradie Tennell | (United States) Audrey Shin | |
| 2021 | Las Vegas, Nevada | (Russia) Alexandra Trusova | (Russia) Daria Usacheva | (South Korea) You Young | |
| 2022 | Norwood, Massachusetts | (Japan) Kaori Sakamoto | (United States) Isabeau Levito | (United States) Amber Glenn | |
| 2023 | Allen, Texas | (Belgium) Loena Hendrickx | (United States) Isabeau Levito | (Estonia) Niina Petrõkina | |
| 2024 | Allen, Texas | (Japan) Wakaba Higuchi | (Japan) Rinka Watanabe | (United States) Isabeau Levito | |
| 2025 | Lake Placid, New York | (United States) Alysa Liu | (Japan) Rinka Watanabe | (Georgia (country)) Anastasiia Gubanova | |
| 2026 | Everett, Washington | (Japan) Ami Nakai | (Individual Neutral Athletes) Alexandra Ignatova | (Japan) Rino Matsuike | |

=== Pairs ===
Pairs event medalists
| Year | Location | Gold | Silver | Bronze | Ref. |
|---|---|---|---|---|---|
| 1979 | Lake Placid, New York | (East Germany); Sabine Baeß; Tassilo Thierbach | (United States); Caitlin Carruthers; Peter Carruthers | (United States); Vicki Heasley; Robert Wagenhoffer | |
| 1980 | No competition held | | | | |
| 1981 | Lake Placid, New York | (Canada); Barbara Underhill; Paul Martini | (United States); Caitlin Carruthers; Peter Carruthers | (Soviet Union); Elena Valova; Oleg Vasiliev | |
| 1982 | Lake Placid, New York | (Soviet Union); Elena Valova; Oleg Vasiliev | (United States); Lea Ann Miller; William Fauver | (Soviet Union); Nelli Chervotkina; Viktor Teslia | |
| 1983 | Rochester, New York | (United States); Caitlin Carruthers; Peter Carruthers | (United States); Jill Watson; Burt Lancon | (Canada); Melinda Kunhegyi; Lyndon Johnston | |
| 1984 | No competition held | | | | |
| 1985 | Saint Paul, Minnesota | (United States); Jill Watson; Peter Oppegard | (Soviet Union); Elena Bechke; Valeri Kornienko | (United States); Gillian Wachsman; Todd Waggoner | |
| 1986 | Portland, Maine | (United States); Katy Keeley; Joseph Mero | (Canada); Denise Benning; Lyndon Johnston | (Soviet Union); Lyudmila Koblova; Andrei Kalitin | |
| 1987 | No competition held | | | | |
| 1988 | Portland, Maine | (Soviet Union); Natalia Mishkutenok; Artur Dmitriev | (Soviet Union); Marina Eltsova; Sergei Zaitsev | (United States); Natalie Seybold; Wayne Seybold | |
| 1989 | Indianapolis, Indiana | (Soviet Union); Natalia Mishkutenok; Artur Dmitriev | (United States); Kristi Yamaguchi; Rudy Galindo | (East Germany); Peggy Schwarz; Alexander König | |
| 1990 | Buffalo, New York | (Soviet Union); Marina Eltsova; Andrei Bushkov | (Czech Republic); Radka Kovaříková; René Novotný | (Germany); Mandy Wötzel; Axel Rauschenbach | |
| 1991 | Oakland, California | (United States); Calla Urbanski; Rocky Marval | (Soviet Union); Elena Nikonova; Nikolai Apter | (Germany); Peggy Schwarz; Alexander König | |
| 1992 | Atlanta, Georgia | (Russia); Marina Eltsova; Andrei Bushkov | (Czech Republic); Radka Kovaříková; René Novotný | (Russia); Evgenia Shishkova; Vadim Naumov | |
| 1993 | Dallas, Texas | (Russia); Evgenia Shishkova; Vadim Naumov | (United States); Kyoko Ina; Jason Dungjen | (United States); Karen Courtland; Todd Reynolds | |
| 1994 | Pittsburgh, Pennsylvania | (Russia); Marina Eltsova; Andrei Bushkov | (Russia); Evgenia Shishkova; Vadim Naumov | (Czech Republic); Radka Kovaříková; René Novotný | |
| 1995 | Detroit, Michigan | (Russia); Marina Eltsova; Andrei Bushkov | (United States); Jenni Meno; Todd Sand | (Latvia); Elena Berezhnaya; Oleg Shliakhov | |
| 1996 | Springfield, Massachusetts | (Russia); Oksana Kazakova; Artur Dmitriev | (United States); Shelby Lyons; Brian Wells | (United States); Stephanie Stiegler; John Zimmerman | |
| 1997 | Detroit, Michigan | (Russia); Marina Eltsova; Andrei Bushkov | (United States); Kyoko Ina; Jason Dungjen | (Russia); Evgenia Shishkova; Vadim Naumov | |
| 1998 | Detroit, Michigan | (Russia); Elena Berezhnaya; Anton Sikharulidze | (Canada); Kristy Wirtz; Kris Wirtz | (Russia); Viktoria Maxiuta; Vladislav Zhovnirski | |
| 1999 | Colorado Springs, Colorado | (Canada); Jamie Salé; David Pelletier | (France); Sarah Abitbol; Stéphane Bernadis | (Russia); Elena Berezhnaya; Anton Sikharulidze | |
| 2000 | Colorado Springs, Colorado | (Canada); Jamie Salé; David Pelletier | (China); Shen Xue; Zhao Hongbo | (Russia); Tatiana Totmianina; Maxim Marinin | |
| 2001 | Colorado Springs, Colorado | (Canada); Jamie Salé; David Pelletier | (United States); Kyoko Ina; John Zimmerman | (Russia); Tatiana Totmianina; Maxim Marinin | |
| 2002 | Spokane, Washington | (Russia); Tatiana Totmianina; Maxim Marinin | (Canada); Anabelle Langlois; Patrice Archetto | (China); Pang Qing; Tong Jian | |
| 2003 | Reading, Pennsylvania | (China); Pang Qing; Tong Jian | (Russia); Maria Petrova; Alexei Tikhonov | (China); Zhang Dan; Zhang Hao | |
| 2004 | Pittsburgh, Pennsylvania | (China); Zhang Dan; Zhang Hao | (Russia); Julia Obertas; Sergei Slavnov | (United States); Rena Inoue; John Baldwin | |
| 2005 | Atlantic City, New Jersey | (China); Zhang Dan; Zhang Hao | (United States); Rena Inoue; John Baldwin | (Russia); Julia Obertas; Sergei Slavnov | |
| 2006 | Hartford, Connecticut | (United States); Rena Inoue; John Baldwin | (Poland); Dorota Siudek; Mariusz Siudek | (United States); Naomi Nari Nam; Themistocles Leftheris | |
| 2007 | Reading, Pennsylvania | (Canada); Jessica Dubé; Bryce Davison | (China); Pang Qing; Tong Jian | (Russia); Vera Bazarova; Yuri Larionov | |
| 2008 | Everett, Washington | (Germany); Aljona Savchenko; Robin Szolkowy | (United States); Keauna McLaughlin; Rockne Brubaker | (Russia); Maria Mukhortova; Maxim Trankov | |
| 2009 | Lake Placid, New York | (China); Shen Xue; Zhao Hongbo | (Ukraine); Tatiana Volosozhar; Stanislav Morozov | (China); Zhang Dan; Zhang Hao | |
| 2010 | Portland, Oregon | (Germany); Aljona Savchenko; Robin Szolkowy | (Canada); Kirsten Moore-Towers; Dylan Moscovitch | (China); Sui Wenjing; Han Cong | |
| 2011 | Ontario, California | (Germany); Aljona Savchenko; Robin Szolkowy | (China); Zhang Dan; Zhang Hao | (Canada); Kirsten Moore-Towers; Dylan Moscovitch | |
| 2012 | Kent, Washington | (Russia); Tatiana Volosozhar; Maxim Trankov | (China); Pang Qing; Tong Jian | (United States); Caydee Denney; John Coughlin | |
| 2013 | Detroit, Michigan | (Russia); Tatiana Volosozhar; Maxim Trankov | (Canada); Kirsten Moore-Towers; Dylan Moscovitch | (Russia); Ksenia Stolbova; Fedor Klimov | |
| 2014 | Chicago, Illinois | (Russia); Yuko Kavaguti; Alexander Smirnov | (United States); Haven Denney; Brandon Frazier | (China); Peng Cheng; Zhang Hao | |
| 2015 | Milwaukee, Wisconsin | (China); Sui Wenjing; Han Cong | (United States); Alexa Scimeca; Chris Knierim | (Canada); Julianne Séguin; Charlie Bilodeau | |
| 2016 | Chicago, Illinois | (Canada); Julianne Séguin; Charlie Bilodeau | (United States); Haven Denney; Brandon Frazier | (Russia); Evgenia Tarasova; Vladimir Morozov | |
| 2017 | Lake Placid, New York | (Germany); Aljona Savchenko; Bruno Massot | (China); Yu Xiaoyu; Zhang Hao | (Canada); Meghan Duhamel; Eric Radford | |
| 2018 | Everett, Washington | (Russia); Evgenia Tarasova; Vladimir Morozov | (Russia); Alisa Efimova; Alexander Korovin | (United States); Ashley Cain; Timothy LeDuc | |
| 2019 | Las Vegas, Nevada | (China); Peng Cheng; Jin Yang | (Russia); Daria Pavliuchenko; Denis Khodykin | (United States); Haven Denney; Brandon Frazier | |
| 2020 | Las Vegas, Nevada | (United States); Alexa Scimeca Knierim; Brandon Frazier | (United States); Jessica Calalang; Brian Johnson | (United States); Audrey Lu; Misha Mitrofanov | |
| 2021 | Las Vegas, Nevada | (Russia); Evgenia Tarasova; Vladimir Morozov | (Japan); Riku Miura; Ryuichi Kihara | (Russia); Aleksandra Boikova; Dmitrii Kozlovskii | |
| 2022 | Norwood, Massachusetts | (United States); Alexa Knierim; Brandon Frazier | (Canada); Deanna Stellato-Dudek; Maxime Deschamps | (Canada); Kelly Ann Laurin; Loucas Éthier | |
| 2023 | Allen, Texas | (Germany); Annika Hocke; Robert Kunkel | (Canada); Lia Pereira; Trennt Michaud | (United States); Chelsea Liu; Balázs Nagy | |
| 2024 | Allen, Texas | (Japan); Riku Miura; Ryuichi Kihara | (United States); Ellie Kam; Daniel O'Shea | (United States); Alisa Efimova; Misha Mitrofanov | |
| 2025 | Lake Placid, New York | (Japan); Riku Miura; Ryuichi Kihara | (Georgia (country)); Anastasiia Metelkina; Luka Berulava | (Canada); Kelly Ann Laurin; Loucas Éthier | |
| 2026 | Everett, Washington | (Germany); Minerva Fabienne Hase; Nikita Volodin | (United States); Alisa Efimova; Misha Mitrofanov | (United States); Katie McBeath; Balázs Nagy | |

=== Ice dance ===
Ice dance event medalists
| Year | Location | Gold | Silver | Bronze | Ref. |
|---|---|---|---|---|---|
| 1979 | Lake Placid, New York | (Hungary); Krisztina Regőczy; András Sallay | (Soviet Union); Natalia Bestemianova; Andrei Bukin | (Canada); Lorna Wighton; John Dowding | |
| 1980 | No competition held | | | | |
| 1981 | Lake Placid, New York | (United States); Judy Blumberg; Michael Seibert | (Soviet Union); Elena Garanina; Igor Zavozin | (United Kingdom); Karen Barber; Nicky Slater | |
| 1982 | Lake Placid, New York | (United States); Elisa Spitz; Scott Gregory | (Soviet Union); Elena Garanina; Igor Zavozin | (Canada); Karyn Garossino; Rod Garossino | |
| 1983 | Rochester, New York | (United States); Elisa Spitz; Scott Gregory | (Canada); Kelly Johnson; John Thomas | (United Kingdom); Wendy Sessions; Stephen Williams | |
| 1984 | No competition held | | | | |
| 1985 | Saint Paul, Minnesota | (United States); Renée Roca; Donald Adair | (Soviet Union); Irina Zhuk; Oleg Petrov | (West Germany); Antonia Becherer; Ferdinand Becherer | |
| 1986 | Portland, Maine | (France); Isabelle Duchesnay; Paul Duchesnay | (United States); Suzanne Semanick; Scott Gregory | (Canada); Jo-Anne Borlase; Scott Chalmers | |
| 1987 | No competition held | | | | |
| 1988 | Portland, Maine | (United States); Susan Wynne; Joseph Druar | (Soviet Union); Svetlana Liapina; Gorsha Sur | (United States); Renée Roca; James Yorke | |
| 1989 | Indianapolis, Indiana | (Soviet Union); Maya Usova; Alexander Zhulin | (United States); April Sargent; Russ Witherby | (Canada); Jo-Anne Borlase; Martin Smith | |
| 1990 | Buffalo, New York | (Italy); Stefania Calegari; Pasquale Camerlengo | (France); Isabelle Sarech; Xavier Debernis | (Soviet Union); Ilona Melnichenko; Gennadi Kaskov | |
| 1991 | Oakland, California | (Soviet Union); Tatiana Navka; Samuel Gezalian | (Finland); Susanna Rahkamo; Petri Kokko | (France); Dominique Yvon; Frédéric Palluel | |
| 1992 | Atlanta, Georgia | (Russia); Maya Usova; Alexander Zhulin | (France); Sophie Moniotte; Pascal Lavanchy | (United States); Elizabeth Punsalan; Jerod Swallow | |
| 1993 | Dallas, Texas | (France); Sophie Moniotte; Pascal Lavanchy | (Czech Republic); Kateřina Mrázová; Martin Šimeček | (United States); Renée Roca; Gorsha Sur | |
| 1994 | Pittsburgh, Pennsylvania | (United States); Elizabeth Punsalan; Jerod Swallow | (France); Marina Anissina; Gwendal Peizerat | (Kazakhstan); Elizaveta Stekolnikova; Dmitri Kazarliga | |
| 1995 | Detroit, Michigan | (Russia); Oksana Grishuk; Evgeni Platov | (Russia); Anjelika Krylova; Oleg Ovsyannikov | (United States); Renée Roca; Gorsha Sur | |
| 1996 | Springfield, Massachusetts | (Russia); Anjelika Krylova; Oleg Ovsyannikov | (Russia); Irina Lobacheva; Ilia Averbukh | (France); Sophie Moniotte; Pascal Lavanchy | |
| 1997 | Detroit, Michigan | (United States); Elizabeth Punsalan; Jerod Swallow | (Italy); Barbara Fusar-Poli; Maurizio Margaglio | (Russia); Anna Semenovich; Vladimir Fedorov | |
| 1998 | Detroit, Michigan | (France); Marina Anissina; Gwendal Peizerat | (Russia); Irina Lobacheva; Ilia Averbukh | (Italy); Barbara Fusar-Poli; Maurizio Margaglio | |
| 1999 | Colorado Springs, Colorado | (Italy); Barbara Fusar-Poli; Maurizio Margaglio | (Russia); Irina Lobacheva; Ilia Averbukh | (United States); Naomi Lang; Peter Tchernyshev | |
| 2000 | Colorado Springs, Colorado | (Italy); Barbara Fusar-Poli; Maurizio Margaglio | (Lithuania); Margarita Drobiazko; Povilas Vanagas | (Canada); Shae-Lynn Bourne; Viktor Kraatz | |
| 2001 | Colorado Springs, Colorado | (Canada); Shae-Lynn Bourne; Victor Kraatz | (Israel); Galit Chait; Sergei Sakhnovski | (Lithuania); Margarita Drobiazko; Povilas Vanagas | |
| 2002 | Spokane, Washington | (Ukraine); Elena Grushina; Ruslan Goncharov | (Russia); Tatiana Navka; Roman Kostomarov | (United States); Tanith Belbin; Benjamin Agosto | |
| 2003 | Reading, Pennsylvania | (United States); Tanith Belbin; Benjamin Agosto | (Ukraine); Elena Grushina; Ruslan Goncharov | (France); Isabelle Delobel; Olivier Schoenfelder | |
| 2004 | Pittsburgh, Pennsylvania | (United States); Tanith Belbin; Benjamin Agosto | (Israel); Galit Chait; Sergei Sakhnovski | (Canada); Megan Wing; Aaron Lowe | |
| 2005 | Atlantic City, New Jersey | (United States); Tanith Belbin; Benjamin Agosto | (France); Isabelle Delobel; Olivier Schoenfelder | (Russia); Oksana Domnina; Maxim Shabalin | |
| 2006 | Hartford, Connecticut | (Bulgaria); Albena Denkova; Maxim Staviski | (United States); Melissa Gregory; Denis Petukhov | (France); Nathalie Péchalat; Fabian Bourzat | |
| 2007 | Reading, Pennsylvania | (United States); Tanith Belbin; Benjamin Agosto | (France); Nathalie Péchalat; Fabian Bourzat | (Italy); Federica Faiella; Massimo Scali | |
| 2008 | Everett, Washington | (France); Isabelle Delobel; Olivier Schoenfelder | (United States); Tanith Belbin; Benjamin Agosto | (United Kingdom); Sinead Kerr; John Kerr | |
| 2009 | Lake Placid, New York | (United States); Tanith Belbin; Benjamin Agosto | (Italy); Anna Cappellini; Luca Lanotte | (Israel); Alexandra Zaretsky; Roman Zaretsky | |
| 2010 | Portland, Oregon | (United States); Meryl Davis; Charlie White | (Canada); Vanessa Crone; Paul Poirier | (United States); Maia Shibutani; Alex Shibutani | |
| 2011 | Ontario, California | (United States); Meryl Davis; Charlie White | (France); Nathalie Péchalat; Fabian Bourzat | (Lithuania); Isabella Tobias; Deividas Stagniūnas | |
| 2012 | Kent, Washington | (United States); Meryl Davis; Charlie White | (Russia); Ekaterina Bobrova; Dmitri Soloviev | (Canada); Kaitlyn Weaver; Andrew Poje | |
| 2013 | Detroit, Michigan | (United States); Meryl Davis; Charlie White | (Italy); Anna Cappellini; Luca Lanotte | (United States); Maia Shibutani; Alex Shibutani | |
| 2014 | Chicago, Illinois | (United States); Madison Chock; Evan Bates | (United States); Maia Shibutani; Alex Shibutani | (Russia); Alexandra Stepanova; Ivan Bukin | |
| 2015 | Milwaukee, Wisconsin | (United States); Madison Chock; Evan Bates | (Russia); Victoria Sinitsina; Nikita Katsalapov | (Canada); Piper Gilles; Paul Poirier | |
| 2016 | Chicago, Illinois | (United States); Maia Shibutani; Alex Shibutani | (United States); Madison Hubbell; Zachary Donohue | (Russia); Ekaterina Bobrova; Dmitri Soloviev | |
| 2017 | Lake Placid, New York | (United States); Maia Shibutani; Alex Shibutani | (Italy); Anna Cappellini; Luca Lanotte | (Russia); Victoria Sinitsina; Nikita Katsalapov | |
| 2018 | Everett, Washington | (United States); Madison Hubbell; Zachary Donohue | (Italy); Charlène Guignard; Marco Fabbri | (Russia); Tiffany Zahorski; Jonathan Guerreiro | |
| 2019 | Las Vegas, Nevada | (United States); Madison Hubbell; Zachary Donohue | (Russia); Alexandra Stepanova; Ivan Bukin | (Canada); Laurence Fournier Beaudry; Nikolaj Sørensen | |
| 2020 | Las Vegas, Nevada | (United States); Madison Hubbell; Zachary Donohue | (United States); Kaitlin Hawayek; Jean-Luc Baker | (United States); Christina Carreira; Anthony Ponomarenko | |
| 2021 | Las Vegas, Nevada | (United States); Madison Hubbell; Zachary Donohue | (United States); Madison Chock; Evan Bates | (Canada); Laurence Fournier Beaudry; Nikolaj Sørensen | |
| 2022 | Norwood, Massachusetts | (United States); Madison Chock; Evan Bates | (United States); Kaitlin Hawayek; Jean-Luc Baker | (Canada); Marie-Jade Lauriault; Romain Le Gac | |
| 2023 | Allen, Texas | (United States); Madison Chock; Evan Bates | (Canada); Marjorie Lajoie; Zachary Lagha | (France); Evgeniia Lopareva; Geoffrey Brissaud | |
| 2024 | Allen, Texas | (United Kingdom); Lilah Fear; Lewis Gibson | (United States); Madison Chock; Evan Bates | (Spain); Olivia Smart; Tim Dieck | |
| 2025 | Lake Placid, New York | (United States); Madison Chock; Evan Bates | (Canada); Marjorie Lajoie; Zachary Lagha | (France); Evgeniia Lopareva; Geoffrey Brissaud | |
| 2026 | Everett, Washington | (United States); Emilea Zingas; Vadym Kolesnik | (France); Evgeniia Lopareva; Geoffrey Brissaud | (Czech Republic); Kateřina Mrázková; Daniel Mrázek | |

== Records ==
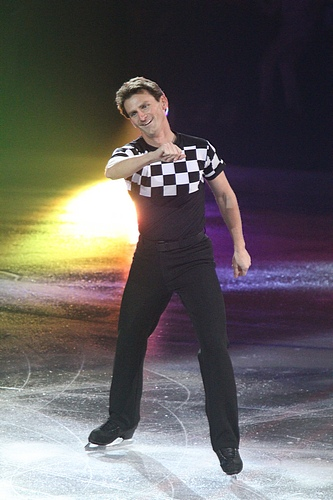
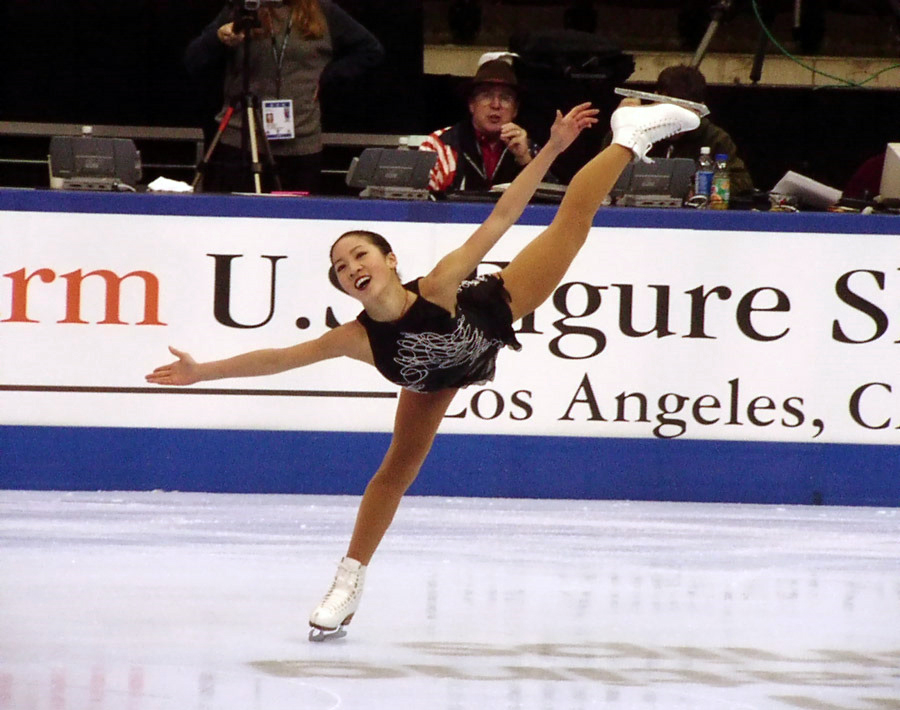
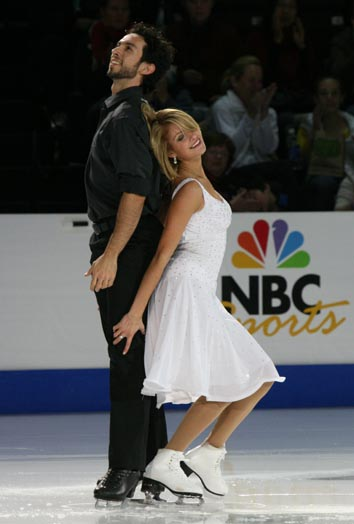
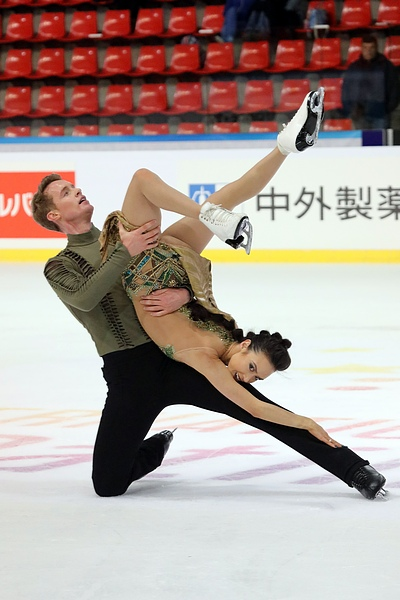
From left to right: Todd Eldredge of the United States won five Skate America titles in men's singles; Michelle Kwan of the United States won seven Skate America titles in women's singles; Tanith Belbin and Benjamin Agosto, and Madison Chock and Evan Bates, both of the United States, have each won five Skate America titles in ice dance.

Records
| Discipline | Most titles | | | |
| Discipline | Skater(s) | No. | Years | Ref. |
|---|---|---|---|---|
| Men's singles | (United States); Todd Eldredge | 5 | 1992; 1994–97 | |
| Women's singles | (United States); Michelle Kwan | 7 | 1995–97; 1999–2002 | |
| Pairs | (Soviet Union); (Russia); Marina Eltsova; Andrei Bushkov | 5 | 1990; 1992; 1994–95; 1997 | |
| Ice dance | (United States); Tanith Belbin; Benjamin Agosto | 5 | 2003–05; 2007; 2009 | |
| Ice dance | (United States); Madison Chock; Evan Bates | 5 | 2014–15; 2022–23; 2025 | |

== Cumulative medal count ==
=== Men's singles ===
Total number of Skate America medals in men's singles by nation
| Rank | Nation | Gold | Silver | Bronze | Total |
|---|---|---|---|---|---|
| 1 | United States | 27 | 21 | 17 | 65 |
| 2 | Japan | 9 | 7 | 5 | 21 |
| 3 | France | 3 | 3 | 3 | 9 |
| 4 | Russia | 2 | 4 | 9 | 15 |
| 5 | Soviet Union | 1 | 2 | 1 | 4 |
| 6 | Czechoslovakia | 1 | 1 | 1 | 3 |
| 7 | Czech Republic | 1 | 1 | 0 | 2 |
| 8 | Ukraine | 1 | 0 | 0 | 1 |
| 9 | West Germany | 0 | 2 | 0 | 2 |
| 10 | Canada | 0 | 1 | 5 | 6 |
| 11 | Belgium | 0 | 1 | 0 | 1 |
| 11 | Italy | 0 | 1 | 0 | 1 |
| 11 | Kazakhstan | 0 | 1 | 0 | 1 |
| 14 | China | 0 | 0 | 1 | 1 |
| 14 | East Germany | 0 | 0 | 1 | 1 |
| 14 | Israel | 0 | 0 | 1 | 1 |
| 14 | South Korea | 0 | 0 | 1 | 1 |
| Totals (17 entries) | | 45 | 45 | 45 | 135 |

=== Women's singles ===
Total number of Skate America medals in women's singles by nation
| Rank | Nation | Gold | Silver | Bronze | Total |
|---|---|---|---|---|---|
| 1 | United States | 24 | 25 | 13 | 62 |
| 2 | Japan | 9 | 8 | 8 | 25 |
| 3 | Russia | 6 | 4 | 10 | 20 |
| 4 | South Korea | 2 | 0 | 1 | 3 |
| 5 | France | 1 | 2 | 2 | 5 |
| 6 | West Germany | 1 | 1 | 0 | 2 |
| 7 | Belgium | 1 | 0 | 1 | 2 |
| 7 | Ukraine | 1 | 0 | 1 | 2 |
| 9 | Canada | 0 | 2 | 0 | 2 |
| 10 | China | 0 | 1 | 1 | 2 |
| 10 | Italy | 0 | 1 | 1 | 2 |
| 12 | Individual Neutral Athletes | 0 | 1 | 0 | 1 |
| 13 | Austria | 0 | 0 | 1 | 1 |
| 13 | East Germany | 0 | 0 | 1 | 1 |
| 13 | Estonia | 0 | 0 | 1 | 1 |
| 13 | Finland | 0 | 0 | 1 | 1 |
| 13 | Georgia | 0 | 0 | 1 | 1 |
| 13 | Hungary | 0 | 0 | 1 | 1 |
| 13 | Sweden | 0 | 0 | 1 | 1 |
| Totals (19 entries) | | 45 | 45 | 45 | 135 |

=== Pairs ===
Total number of Skate America medals in pairs by nation
| Rank | Nation | Gold | Silver | Bronze | Total |
|---|---|---|---|---|---|
| 1 | Russia | 13 | 5 | 12 | 30 |
| 2 | United States | 7 | 18 | 14 | 39 |
| 3 | Canada | 6 | 7 | 6 | 19 |
| 4 | China | 6 | 5 | 5 | 16 |
| 5 | Germany | 6 | 0 | 2 | 8 |
| 6 | Soviet Union | 4 | 3 | 3 | 10 |
| 7 | Japan | 2 | 1 | 0 | 3 |
| 8 | East Germany | 1 | 0 | 1 | 2 |
| 9 | Czech Republic | 0 | 2 | 1 | 3 |
| 10 | France | 0 | 1 | 0 | 1 |
| 10 | Georgia | 0 | 1 | 0 | 1 |
| 10 | Poland | 0 | 1 | 0 | 1 |
| 10 | Ukraine | 0 | 1 | 0 | 1 |
| 14 | Latvia | 0 | 0 | 1 | 1 |
| Totals (14 entries) | | 45 | 45 | 45 | 135 |

=== Ice dance ===
Total number of Skate America medals in ice dance by nation
| Rank | Nation | Gold | Silver | Bronze | Total |
|---|---|---|---|---|---|
| 1 | United States | 28 | 10 | 9 | 47 |
| 2 | Russia | 4 | 8 | 6 | 18 |
| 3 | France | 4 | 7 | 6 | 17 |
| 4 | Italy | 3 | 5 | 2 | 10 |
| 5 | Soviet Union | 2 | 5 | 1 | 8 |
| 6 | Canada | 1 | 4 | 11 | 16 |
| 7 | Ukraine | 1 | 1 | 0 | 2 |
| 8 | Great Britain | 1 | 0 | 3 | 4 |
| 9 | Hungary | 1 | 0 | 0 | 1 |
| 10 | Israel | 0 | 2 | 1 | 3 |
| 11 | Lithuania | 0 | 1 | 2 | 3 |
| 12 | Czech Republic | 0 | 1 | 1 | 2 |
| 13 | Finland | 0 | 1 | 0 | 1 |
| 14 | Kazakhstan | 0 | 0 | 1 | 1 |
| 14 | Spain | 0 | 0 | 1 | 1 |
| 14 | West Germany | 0 | 0 | 1 | 1 |
| Totals (16 entries) | | 45 | 45 | 45 | 135 |

=== Total medals ===
Total number of Skate America medals by nation
| Rank | Nation | Gold | Silver | Bronze | Total |
|---|---|---|---|---|---|
| 1 | United States | 86 | 74 | 53 | 213 |
| 2 | Russia | 25 | 21 | 37 | 83 |
| 3 | Japan | 20 | 16 | 13 | 49 |
| 4 | France | 8 | 13 | 11 | 32 |
| 5 | Canada | 7 | 14 | 22 | 43 |
| 6 | Soviet Union | 7 | 10 | 5 | 22 |
| 7 | China | 6 | 6 | 7 | 19 |
| 8 | Germany | 6 | 0 | 2 | 8 |
| 9 | Italy | 3 | 7 | 3 | 13 |
| 10 | Ukraine | 3 | 2 | 1 | 6 |
| 11 | South Korea | 2 | 0 | 2 | 4 |
| 12 | Czech Republic | 1 | 4 | 2 | 7 |
| 13 | West Germany | 1 | 3 | 1 | 5 |
| 14 | Belgium | 1 | 1 | 1 | 3 |
| 14 | Czechoslovakia | 1 | 1 | 1 | 3 |
| 16 | East Germany | 1 | 0 | 3 | 4 |
| 16 | Great Britain | 1 | 0 | 3 | 4 |
| 18 | Hungary | 1 | 0 | 1 | 2 |
| 19 | Israel | 0 | 2 | 2 | 4 |
| 20 | Lithuania | 0 | 1 | 2 | 3 |
| 21 | Finland | 0 | 1 | 1 | 2 |
| 21 | Georgia | 0 | 1 | 1 | 2 |
| 21 | Kazakhstan | 0 | 1 | 1 | 2 |
| 24 | Individual Neutral Athletes | 0 | 1 | 0 | 1 |
| 24 | Poland | 0 | 1 | 0 | 1 |
| 26 | Austria | 0 | 0 | 1 | 1 |
| 26 | Estonia | 0 | 0 | 1 | 1 |
| 26 | Latvia | 0 | 0 | 1 | 1 |
| 26 | Spain | 0 | 0 | 1 | 1 |
| 26 | Sweden | 0 | 0 | 1 | 1 |
| Totals (30 entries) | | 180 | 180 | 180 | 540 |
