= Naomi Lang =

American ice dancer

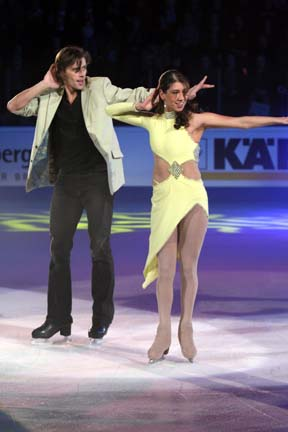
- Naomi Lang and Peter Tchernyshev. Nürnberg Gala 2007

Personal information
- Born: December 18, 1978 (age 47)
- Height: 5 ft 6 in (1.68 m)

Figure skating career
- Country: United States
- Partner: Peter Tchernyshev
- Skating club: Desert Ice Skating Club of Arizona
- Retired: February 2004
Medal record
Figure skating: Ice dancing
Representing the United States
Four Continents Championships
Bronze medal – third place	2003 Beijing	Ice dancing
Gold medal – first place	2002 Jeonju	Ice dancing
Silver medal – second place	2001 Salt Lake City	Ice dancing
Gold medal – first place	2000 Osaka	Ice dancing
Bronze medal – third place	1999 Halifax	Ice dancing

Naomi Lang (born December 18, 1978) is an American former competitive ice dancer. With skating partner Peter Tchernyshev, she is a two-time Four Continents champion (2000 and 2002), a five-time U.S. national champion (1999–2003), and competed at the 2002 Olympic Winter Games. Lang is the first Native American female athlete to participate in the Winter Olympics. She is an enrolled member of the Karuk Tribe of California.

== Personal life ==
Naomi Lang was born in Arcata, California, to Leslie Dixon and Jason Lang, a member of the Karuk tribe. She started to dance at the age of three and continued with ballet dancing to the age of 15, beginning her training at the Dancer's Studio in Eureka, California. She performed with the Grand Rapids (Michigan) Ballet Co. and studied ballet at the Interlochen Arts Academy where at the age of 12 she received an award for 'Outstanding Achievement in Ballet'. She graduated from Lake Placid High School in Lake Placid, New York, in 1997.

In 2004, Lang had a daughter with Ukrainian ice acrobat Vladimir Besedin. She married American ice dancer Mark Fitzgerald in August 2008 in Tarrytown, New York. They had two children before divorcing in 2016.

Lang later married Jeffrey Strong, and they have two children together. The family resides in Gilbert, Arizona.

== Skating career ==
Lang started skating when she was eight, after seeing Smurfs On Ice. She began competitive ice dance with John Lee, winning the 1995 U.S. Novice title and the 1996 U.S. Junior silver medal.

=== Partnership with Tchernyshev ===
Having noticed her at U.S. Nationals, Peter Tchernyshev wrote her a letter in mid-1996 asking for a tryout. They had a successful tryout in Lake Placid, New York, and trained there for nine months with Natalia Dubova; then, due to Lang's homesickness, they moved to Detroit and began training with Igor Shpilband and Elizabeth Coates.

Lang/Tchernyshev first won the U.S. national title in 1999. The following season, they took gold at the 2000 Four Continents Championships and placed 8th at the 2000 World Championships. They also performed with Champions on Ice.

In 2000, Lang/Tchernyshev moved to Hackensack, New Jersey, to train with Alexander Zhulin, who coached them until the end of the 2001–02 season. They missed their 2001 Grand Prix events because Tchernyshev had shin splints. Returning to competition, they won their fourth national title at the 2002 U.S. Championships and then won their second Four Continents title. They placed eleventh at the 2002 Winter Olympics and ninth at the 2002 World Championships.

In 2002–03, Lang/Tchernyshev were coached by Nikolai Morozov. After missing their 2002 Grand Prix events due to an injury to Lang, the duo won their fifth national title at the 2003 U.S. Championships, took bronze at the 2003 Four Continents, and placed 8th at the 2003 World Championships.

Lang/Tchernyshev did not appear internationally in the 2003–04 season. They intended to compete at the 2004 U.S. Championships but withdrew after Lang re-injured her Achilles tendon. They announced their competitive retirement in February 2004. The duo continued to skate together professionally and appeared in several U.S. ice shows, including many of the Disson skating shows televised on NBC and the Hallmark Channel. They also toured extensively in Europe and Russia, performing in Art on Ice, Kings on Ice with Evgeni Plushenko and composer and violinist Edvin Marton, and the Katarina Witt Farewell Tour. They performed at Jim Carrey's private Christmas party in Hollywood.

Lang works at The Ice Den Chandler/Scottsdale as the Manager of Ice Dance.

== Programs ==
(with Tchernyshev)

Season	Original dance	Free dance	Exhibition
2002–2003	Waltz by Dmitri Shostakovich; Polka by Bedřich Smetana	Still Loving You by Scorpions	
2001–2002	Carmen by Georges Bizet: March of the Toreadors; Habanera; March of the Toreadors	Parisian Walkways by Gary Moore	Fallin' by Alicia Keys
2000–2001	Fly Me to the Moon by Frank Sinatra; One Minute Tramp by C. Basie	Air on a G String by Johann Sebastian Bach; Storm (from The Four Seasons) by Antonio Vivaldi performed by Vanessa-Mae	Parisian Walkways; Still Got the Blues by Gary Moore
1999–2000	Oye Cómo Va by Carlos Santana	Anytime, Anywhere by Sarah Brightman	All I Ask of You by Andrew Lloyd Webber
1998–1999	Masquerade Waltz by Aram Khachaturian; Waltz of the Flowers by Pyotr Tchaikovsky	Adiós Nonino by Astor Piazzolla	Falling into You by Celine Dion
1997–1998	Good Golly, Miss Molly by Little Richard	Sobre El Arco Iris by Pérez Prado; Ran Kan Kan by Tito Puente; Sempre Nel Mio Cuor by Pérez Prado; Mambo Caliente by Arturo Sandoval	Good Golly, Miss Molly by Little Richard

== Results ==
(with Tchernyshev)

International
Event	1996–97	1997–98	1998–99	1999–00	2000–01	2001–02	2002–03	2003–04
Olympics						11th		
Worlds			10th	8th	9th	9th	8th	
Four Continents			3rd	1st	2nd	1st	3rd	
GP Cup of Russia			5th					
GP Lalique				5th				
GP Skate America		6th	5th	3rd	5th			
GP Skate Canada		9th						
Lysiane Lauret		2nd						
National
U.S. Champ.	5th	3rd	1st	1st	1st	1st	1st	WD
GP = Grand Prix; WD = Withdrew

(with Lee)

Event	1996
U.S. Championships	2nd J.
J. = Junior level

== See also ==
- Mabel Fairbanks
