= Steve Hartsell =

American pair skater

Personal information
- Born: January 6, 1978 (age 48) Ann Arbor, Michigan, United States
- Height: 5 ft 9 in (175 cm)

Figure skating career
- Country: United States
- Retired: 2004
Medal record
Representing United States
Pairs' Figure skating
Four Continents Championships
Bronze medal – third place	1999 Halifax	Pairs

Steve Hartsell (born January 6, 1978, Ann Arbor, Michigan) is an American former competitive pair skater. With sister Danielle Hartsell, he is the 1999 U.S. National Champion and the 1997 World Junior Champion. After his sister retired, he skated with Marcy Hinzmann and Kristen Roth.

== Results ==
Men's singles

Event	1996
U.S. Championships	12th N.

(with Danielle Hartsell)

Event	1995-96	1996-97	1997-98	1998-99	1999-00	2000-01	2001-02
World Championships				10th			
Four Continents Championships				3rd		9th	
U.S. Championships	8th	5th	3rd	1st		3rd	WD
Skate America			6th	4th	8th		5th
Skate Canada International							8th
Cup of Russia		9th					
NHK Trophy				4th	5th	6th	
Sparkassen Cup on Ice						7th	
Karl Schäfer Memorial			2nd	1st			
Nebelhorn Trophy	8th	1st					

=== With Marcy Hinzmann ===
Event	2003
U.S. Championships	9th

=== With Kristen Roth ===
Event	2004	2005
U.S. Championships	12th	WD
