= Danielle Hartsell =

American pair skater

Personal information
- Born: November 21, 1980 (age 45) Ann Arbor, Michigan, United States
- Height: 5 ft 2 in (157 cm)

Figure skating career
- Country: United States
- Retired: 2002
Medal record
Representing United States
Pairs' Figure skating
Four Continents Championships
Bronze medal – third place	1999 Halifax	Pairs

Danielle Hartsell (born November 21, 1980, in Ann Arbor, Michigan) is an American former competitive pair skater. With brother Steve Hartsell, she is the 1999 U.S. National Champion and 1997 World Junior Champion. She married Chris Minnis on September 20, 2003

== Programs ==
Season	Short program	Free skating
2001–2002	Broken Arrow - Stealth (soundtrack) by Hans Zimmer	The Tales of Beatrix Potter by John Lanchbery

== Results ==
Ladies' Singles

Event	1996
U.S. Championships	9th N.

(with Steve Hartsell)

Event	1995-96	1996-97	1997-98	1998-99	1999-00	2000-01	2001-02
World Championships				10th			
Four Continents Championships				3rd		9th	
U.S. Championships	8th	5th	3rd	1st		3rd	WD
Skate America			6th	4th	8th		5th
Skate Canada International							8th
Cup of Russia		9th					
NHK Trophy				4th	5th	6th	
Sparkassen Cup on Ice						7th	
Karl Schäfer Memorial			2nd	1st			
Nebelhorn Trophy	8th	1st					
