= John Zimmerman (figure skater) =

American figure skater

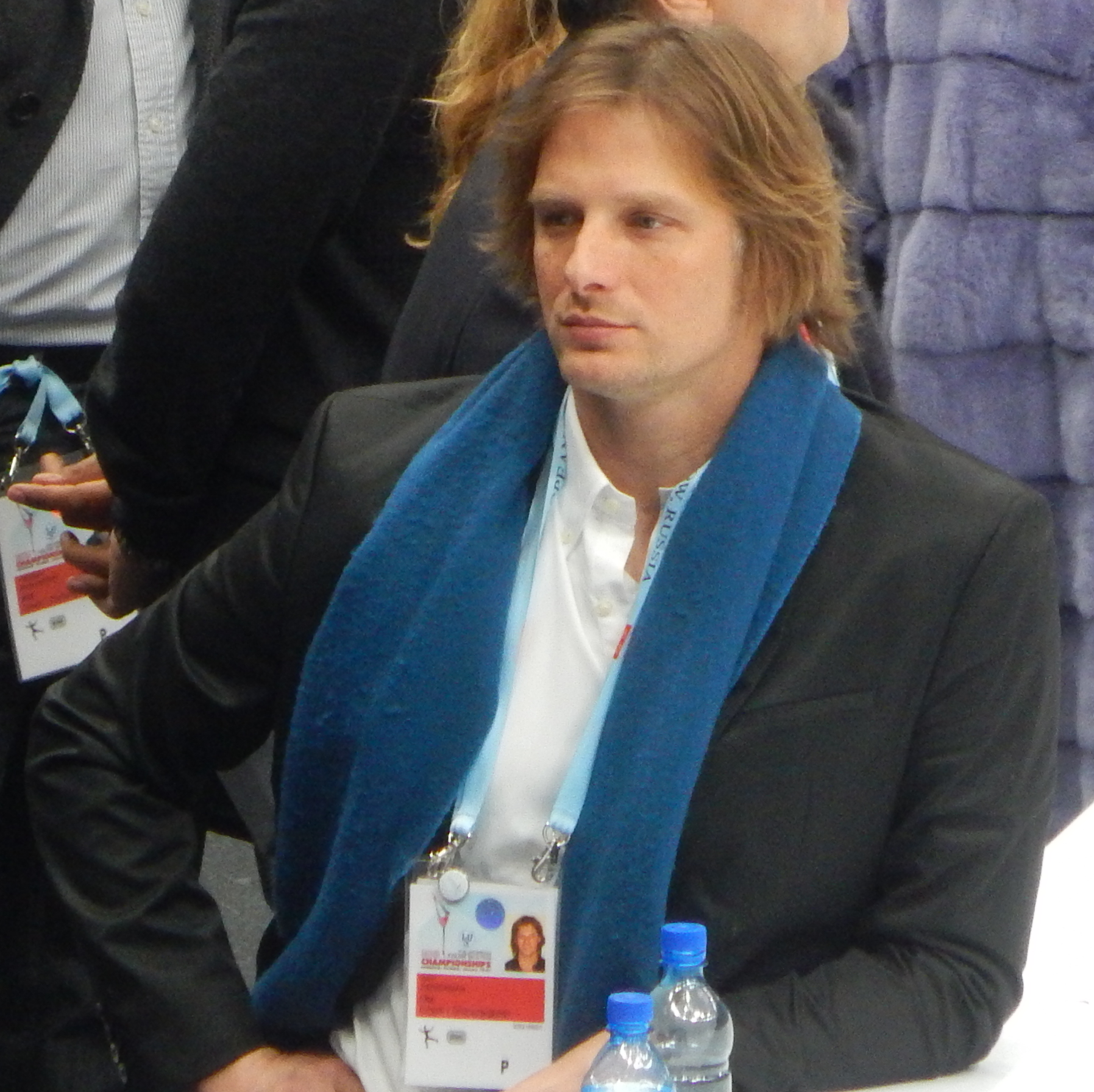
- Zimmerman in 2018

Personal information
- Full name: John Luther Zimmerman IV
- Born: November 26, 1973 (age 52) Birmingham, Alabama, U.S.
- Height: 6 ft 0 in (1.83 m)

Figure skating career
- Country: United States
- Partner: Kyoko Ina
- Skating club: Birmingham FSC
- Retired: 2002
Medal record
Figure skating: Pairs
Representing United States
World Championships
Bronze medal – third place	2002 Nagano	Pairs
Four Continents Championships
Bronze medal – third place	2001 Salt Lake City	Pairs
Silver medal – second place	2000 Osaka	Pairs

John Luther Zimmerman IV (born November 26, 1973) is an American professional pair skater and coach. With skating partner Kyoko Ina, he is the 2002 World bronze medalist and a three-time U.S. national champion. They also competed at the 2002 Olympics. Zimmerman was suspended by the United States Center for SafeSport in March 2021 for a two-year period.

== Personal life ==
Zimmerman was born in Birmingham, Alabama. He has two older sisters. He married Italian-American skater Silvia Fontana on August 28, 2003. They have two daughters, one born on April 2, 2012, at Northwest Medical Center in Coconut Creek, Florida, and another born on June 2, 2013.

== Career ==
Zimmerman started skating at age 3 at a mall. He briefly partnered with Brie Teaboldt for the 1994-95 season. Then he paired with Stephanie Stiegler from 1995 through 1998, and won the bronze medal at the 1997 U.S. Figure Skating Championships while being coached by Peter Oppegard. Their partnership ended in 1998 due to injuries.

Zimmerman teamed up with Kyoko Ina in 1998. Initially, they were coached by Peter Burrows and Mary Lynn Gelderman in Monsey, New York, and they also commuted to Stamford, Connecticut, to work with Tamara Moskvina. They later trained under Moskvina and Igor Moskvin in Hackensack, New Jersey.

Ina and Zimmerman won the bronze medal at the 2002 World Championships. In 2003, they turned professional and began skating on Stars on Ice.

Zimmerman competed in the January 2006 FOX television program "Skating with Celebrities", where he partnered with FOX broadcaster Jillian Barberie. They finished in second place.

Zimmerman was featured as Yahoo's special guest expert correspondent for figure skating at the 2006 Winter Olympics in Turin. He later competed in an ABC skating series "Thin Ice" (aired on March 19, 2010), paired with world champion Canadian ice dancer Shae-Lynn Bourne. They finished in second place, winning a total of $50,000. They skated to "Closer" by Ne-Yo and "Poker Face" by Lady Gaga.

Zimmerman worked as a coach at Panthers Ice Den in Coral Springs, Florida, with Silvia Fontana. They now coach at AdventHealth Center Ice in Wesley Chapel, Florida. He has coached Haven Denney / Brandon Frazier (from Autumn 2012 to February 2015 and since 2018 again) and Vanessa James / Morgan Cipres (from June 2016).

== Suspension ==
In December 2019, Zimmerman, Fontana, and fellow coach Vinny Dispenza, were accused in a United States Center for SafeSport investigation of covering up alleged sexual abuse committed by Ciprès via intimidation tactics. Zimmerman was suspended for two years and received one additional year of probation by SafeSport in March 2021 for abuse of process, emotional misconduct, and failure to report sexual abuse of a 13 year old he was coaching. He was barred from any skating events run by U.S. Figure Skating or the Olympic committee, and prohibited from attending any facility run by those groups.

== Programs ==
(with Ina)

Season	Short program	Free skating
2001–02	Shine On You Crazy Diamond by Roger Waters, Pink Floyd	Rhapsody on a Theme of Paganini by Sergei Rachmaninov
2000–01	Truman Show	Rhapsody on a Theme of Paganini by Sergei Rachmaninov

== Results ==
GP: Champions Series / Grand Prix

=== With Kyoko Ina ===
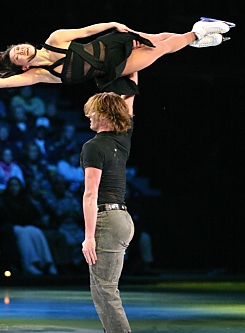
Ina and Zimmerman perform a "detroiter".

International
Event	1998–99	99–2000	2000–01	2001–02
Olympics				5th
Worlds	9th	7th	7th	3rd
Four Continents		2nd	3rd	
GP Final	5th			4th
GP Cup of Russia	3rd		4th	
GP Lalique	2nd	4th	3rd	2nd
GP Skate America	5th	5th	4th	2nd
GP Skate Canada		2nd		
GP Sparkassen				2nd
National
U.S. Champ.	2nd	1st	1st	1st

=== With Stephanie Stiegler ===
International
Event	1995–96	1996–97
World Championships		15th
GP Trophée Lalique		6th
GP Skate America		3rd
National
U.S. Championships	4th	3rd

=== With Brie Teaboldt ===
Event	1994–95
U.S. Championships	12th
