= Alexander Abt =

Russian figure skater and coach

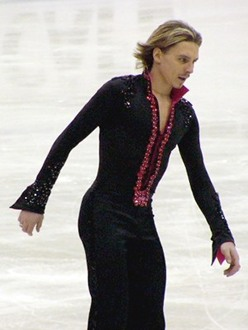
- Abt at the 2003 NHK Trophy

Personal information
- Full name: Alexander Viktorovich Abt
- Nickname: Sasha
- Born: October 22, 1976 (age 49) Moscow, Russia
- Height: 1.79 m (5 ft 10 in)

Figure skating career
- Country: Russia
- Discipline: Men's singles
- Began skating: 1982
- Retired: 2004

Medal record
European Championships
Silver medal – second place	2002 Lausanne	Singles
Bronze medal – third place	1998 Milan	Singles
Russian Championships
Gold medal – first place	2003 Kazan	Singles
Silver medal – second place	2002 Moscow	Singles
Bronze medal – third place	2000 Moscow	Singles
Bronze medal – third place	2001 Moscow	Singles
World Junior Championships
Silver medal – second place	1991 Budapest	Singles

Alexander "Sasha" Viktorovich Abt (Russian: Александр "Саша" Викторович Абт; born October 22, 1976) is a Russian figure skater and coach. He is a two-time European medalist and placed fifth at the 2002 Winter Olympics.

== Career ==
Abt's first experience with figure skating came at the age of six when his grandmother took him to a rink. Sergei Volkov coached him early on but he began suffering from cancer and sent Abt to be trained by Rafael Arutyunyan before he died. Soon after, Abt began to make a name for himself on the junior circuit and won the silver medal at the 1991 World Junior Championships.

Abt underwent surgery for a knee problem early in his career. Later, in the summer of 1996, he sustained a serious injury during an exhibition performance in Mexico – He crashed into the boards and cut into his right leg's quadriceps muscle with his left blade, keeping him in hospital for several weeks and off ice for six months. He was a late replacement at the 1997 European Championships, where he won the bronze medal.

Alexander placed fourth at the 1998 Russian Championships and was not named to the Olympic team. Later that year, he placed third at the European Championships, behind fellow countrymen Alexei Yagudin and Evgeni Plushenko and claimed the bronze medal. Abt underwent knee surgery in December 1998.

Abt had a sinus infection at the 2001 European Championships and underwent surgery in spring 2001 to remove a cyst from his sinuses. In June 2001, he moved to Lake Arrowhead, California, for training. Abt won the silver medal at the 2002 European Championships, and came in fifth at the 2002 Winter Olympics. Abt intended to retire following that season, but instead elected to continue competing. Having worked with Arutyunyan for eleven years, Abt decided to move to a new coach, Alexander Zhulin, in May 2002.

Abt won three Grand Prix medals, as well as his first (and only) Russian Championship in the 2002-03 season. He was forced to withdraw from the 2003 European Championships after injuring his landing ankle in practice a day before he was supposed to fly out, and took several months to recover. His last competition was the 2004 Russian Championships. He withdrew after placing fourth in the short program.

Abt retired from competition and participated in the Russian TV show Ice Age (2008). He played one of the main roles in a Russian soap opera about figure skating, My Hot Ice (2008–2009). Abt has skated in Japan for Prince Ice World and in Russia on the Ice Symphony tour. He coaches in New Jersey.

== Personal life ==
In April 1999, Abt married former ice dancer Elena Pavlova, who competed with her brother Alexander Pavlov. They have one son, Makar, born in March 2000. The family now resides in New Jersey, in the United States.

== Programs ==
Season	Short program	Free skating	Exhibition
2003–2004	Yablochko (Russian Sailor Dance from "The Red Poppy") by Reinhold Glière	Nyah from Mission Impossible 2 soundtrack by Hans Zimmer	
2002–2003	Yablochko (Russian Sailor Dance from "The Red Poppy") by Reinhold Glière	Bolero by Maurice Ravel	
2001–2002	Artsakh by Ara Gevorgyan	Piano Concerto No.2 Op.18 III. Allegro Scherzando by Sergei Rachmaninoff performed by the San Francisco Symphony Orchestra; Piano Concerto No.3 Op.30 III. Finale Alla Breve by Sergei Rachmaninoff performed by the London Philharmonic Orchestra	Wonderful World
2000–2001	Artsakh by Ara Gevorgyan	Gladiator by Hans Zimmer, Lisa Gerrard	

== Results ==
Results
International
Event	1990–91	1992–93	1993–94	1994–95	1995–96	1996–97	1997–98	1998–99	1999–00	2000–01	2001–02	2002–03	2003–04
Olympics											5th		
Worlds									6th	8th	4th		
Europeans							3rd		4th	4th	2nd	WD	
Grand Prix Final								5th	4th			4th	
GP Cup of Russia								3rd	2nd			3rd	6th
GP Nations Cup / Sparkassen / Bofrost							3rd	2nd		4th	4th	2nd	
GP NHK Trophy					8th								5th
GP Skate America					3rd		3rd		7th	5th	3rd	2nd	
Nebelhorn				3rd			3rd						
Winter Universiade						3rd							
International: Junior
Junior Worlds	2nd	7th	8th										
National
Russian Champ.			4th	4th	18th	7th	4th		3rd	3rd	2nd	1st	WD
Soviet Junior	1st												
GP = Grand Prix; WD = Withdrew
