= 1996 Skate Canada International =

- Type: Champions Series
- Date: November 7 – 10
- Season: 1996–97
- Location: Kitchener, Ontario

Champions
- Men's singles: (Canada) Elvis Stojko
- Ladies' singles: (Russia) Irina Slutskaya
- Pairs: (Germany) Mandy Wötzel / Ingo Steuer
- Ice dance: (Canada) Shae-Lynn Bourne / Victor Kraatz
- Previous: 1995 Skate Canada International
- Next: 1997 Skate Canada International
- Previous Grand Prix: 1996 Skate America
- Next Grand Prix: 1996 Trophée Lalique

The 1996 Skate Canada International was the second event of six in the 1996–97 ISU Champions Series, a senior-level international invitational competition series. It was held in Kitchener, Ontario on November 7–10. Medals were awarded in the disciplines of men's singles, ladies' singles, pair skating, and ice dancing. Skaters earned points toward qualifying for the 1996–97 Champions Series Final.

== Results ==
=== Men ===
Rank	Name	Nation	TFP	SP	FS
1	Elvis Stojko	Canada	1.5	1	1
2	Ilia Kulik	Russia	3.0	2	2
3	Scott Davis	United States	5.0	4	3
4	Steven Cousins	United Kingdom	7.0	6	4
5	Dmytro Dmytrenko	Ukraine	7.5	5	5
6	Michael Weiss	United States	7.5	3	6
7	Thierry Cerez	France	12.0	10	7
8	Andrei Vlachtchenko	Germany	12.0	8	8
9	Takeshi Honda	Japan	12.5	7	9
10	Cornel Gheorghe	Romania	14.5	9	10
11	Jayson Dénommée	Canada	16.5	11	11
12	Fabrizio Garattoni	Italy	18.0	12	12

=== Ladies ===
Rank	Name	Nation	TFP	SP	FS
1	Irina Slutskaya	Russia	1.5	1	1
2	Tara Lipinski	United States	3.5	3	2
3	Lucinda Ruh	Switzerland	5.0	4	3
4	Julia Vorobieva	Azerbaijan	7.0	2	6
5	Jennifer Robinson	Canada	7.5	5	5
6	Susan Humphreys	Canada	8.5	9	4
7	Silvia Fontana	Italy	11.0	8	7
8	Astrid Hochstetter	Germany	11.5	7	8
9	Elena Liashenko	Ukraine	12.0	6	9

=== Pairs ===
Rank	Name	Nation	TFP	SP	FS
1	Mandy Wötzel / Ingo Steuer	Germany	2.5	3	1
2	Marina Eltsova / Andrei Bushkov	Russia	2.5	1	2
3	Kyoko Ina / Jason Dungjen	United States	4.0	2	3
4	Kristy Sargeant / Kris Wirtz	Canada	6.0	4	4
5	Sarah Abitbol / Stéphane Bernadis	France	7.5	5	5
6	Jodeyne Higgins / Sean Rice	Canada	9.5	7	6
7	Michelle Menzies / Jean-Michel Bombardier	Canada	11.0	8	7
8	Lesley Rogers / Michael Aldred	United Kingdom	12.5	9	8
WD	Peggy Schwarz / Mirko Müller	Germany		6	

=== Ice dancing ===
Rank	Name	Nation	TFP	CD	OD	FD
1	Shae-Lynn Bourne / Victor Kraatz	Canada	2.0	1	1	1
2	Marina Anissina / Gwendal Peizerat	France	4.0	2	2	2
3	Barbara Fusar-Poli / Maurizio Margaglio	Italy	6.6	3	4	3
4	Margarita Drobiazko / Povilas Vanagas	Lithuania	7.4	4	3	4
5	Sylwia Nowak / Sebastian Kolasiński	Poland	10.0	5	5	5
6	Anna Semenovich / Vladimir Fedorov	Russia	12.0	6	6	6
7	Eve Chalom / Mathew Gates	United States	14.0	7	7	7
8	Chantal Lefebvre / Michel Brunet	Canada	17.0	9	9	8
9	Marika Humphreys / Philip Askew	United Kingdom	17.0	8	8	9
10	Kaho Koinuma / Tigran Arakelian	Armenia	20.0	10	10	10
