= 1995 Skate Canada International =

1995 Skate Skate Canada International
- Type: Champions Series
- Date: November 2 – 5
- Season: 1995–96
- Location: Saint John, New Brunswick

Champions
- Men's singles: (Russia) Alexei Urmanov
- Ladies' singles: (United States) Michelle Kwan
- Pairs: (Russia) Evgenia Shishkova / Vadim Naumov
- Ice dance: (Canada) Shae-Lynn Bourne / Victor Kraatz
- Previous: 1994 Skate Canada International
- Next: 1996 Skate Canada International
- Previous Grand Prix: 1995 Skate America
- Next Grand Prix: 1995 Trophée Lalique

The 1995 Skate Canada International was the second event of five in the 1995–96 ISU Champions Series, a senior-level international invitational competition series. It was held in Saint John, New Brunswick on November 2–5. Medals were awarded in the disciplines of men's singles, ladies' singles, pair skating, and ice dancing. Skaters earned points toward qualifying for the 1995–96 Champions Series Final.

== Results ==
=== Men ===
Rank	Name	Nation	TFP	SP	FS
1	Alexei Urmanov	Russia	1.5	1	1
2	Michael Shmerkin	Israel	4.5	3	3
3	Éric Millot	France	5.0	6	2
4	Scott Davis	United States	5.0	2	4
5	Steven Cousins	United Kingdom	7.0	4	5
6	Viacheslav Zagorodniuk	Ukraine	8.5	5	6
7	Dmitri Dmitrenko	Ukraine	10.5	7	7
8	Sébastien Britten	Canada	12.5	9	8
9	Cornel Gheorghe	Romania	14.0	10	9
10	Andrejs Vlascenko	Germany	14.0	8	10
11	Szabolcs Vidrai	Hungary	18.5	15	11
12	Thierry Cerez	France	18.5	13	12
13	Jean-Francois Hebert	Canada	19.0	12	13
14	Naoki Shigematsu	Japan	20.5	11	15
15	Markus Leminen	Finland	21.0	14	14

=== Ladies ===
Rank	Name	Nation	TFP	SP	FS
1	Michelle Kwan	United States	1.5	1	1
2	Hanae Yokoya	Japan	3.0	2	2
3	Josée Chouinard	Canada	4.5	3	3
4	Olga Markova	Russia	6.0	4	4
5	Susan Humphreys	Canada	8.0	6	5
6	Lucinda Ruh	Switzerland	9.5	5	7
7	Krisztina Czakó	Hungary	10.0	8	6
8	Elena Liashenko	Ukraine	11.5	7	8
9	Evelyn Großmann	Germany	14.0	10	9
10	Jennifer Robinson	Canada	14.5	9	10

=== Pairs ===
Rank	Name	Nation	TFP	SP	FS
1	Evgenia Shishkova / Vadim Naumov	Russia	1.5	1	1
2	Maria Petrova / Anton Sikharulidze	Russia	3.0	2	2
3	Jodeyne Higgins / Sean Rice	Canada	4.5	3	3
4	Shelby Lyons / Brian Wells	United States	6.5	5	4
5	Olena Bilousivska / Serhiy Potalov	Ukraine	7.0	4	5
6	Line Haddad / Sylvain Privé	France	9.5	7	6
7	Michelle Menzies / Jean-Michel Bombardier	Canada	10.0	6	7
8	Lesley Rogers / Michael Aldred	United Kingdom	12.0	8	8

=== Ice dancing ===
Rank	Name	Nation	TFP	CD1	CD2	OD	FD
1	Shae-Lynn Bourne / Victor Kraatz	Canada	2.0	1	1	1	1
2	Marina Anissina / Gwendal Peizerat	France	4.0	2	2	2	2
3	Irina Romanova / Igor Yaroshenko	Ukraine	6.0	3	3	3	3
4	Irina Lobacheva / Ilia Averbukh	Russia	8.0	4	4	4	4
5	Elizaveta Stekolnikova / Dmitri Kazarlyga	Kazakhstan	10.0	5	5	5	5
6	Kateřina Mrázová / Martin Šimeček	Czech Republic	12.0	6	6	6	6
7	Barbara Fusar-Poli / Maurizio Margaglio	Italy	15.0	8	8	8	7
8	Margarita Drobiazko / Povilas Vanagas	Lithuania	15.0	7	7	7	8
9	Kati Winkler / René Lohse	Germany	19.0	10	10	10	9
10	Megan Wing / Aaron Lowe	Canada	19.0	9	9	9	10
11	Agnes Jacquemard / Alexis Gayet	France	22.0	11	11	11	11
