= Stacey Ball =

Canadian pair skater (born 1973)

Personal information
- Born: November 25, 1973 (age 52) St. Thomas, Ontario, Canada
- Height: 163 cm (5 ft 4 in)

Figure skating career
- Country: Canada
- Discipline: Pair skating

Stacey Ball (born November 25, 1973) is a former Canadian pair skater who also competed in women's singles. With partner Jean-Michel Bombardier, she won the bronze medal at the 1991 Canadian Figure Skating Championships.

== Career ==
Ball began skating as a toddler and competed both in pairs and women's singles. She said of competing in both disciplines, "I like skating both, but I think I like pairs better because it's more exciting getting thrown." In 1988, she and her sister moved to Montreal to train, followed by their mother the next year.

As a pair skater, she skated first with Jeffrey Gavin, with whom she won the 1987 Canadian National Championships novice title. Next, she paired with Kris Wirtz; the two placed 8th at the 1988 Skate America and won silver in the junior competition at the 1989 Canadian National Championships. The partnership ended after Wirtz's brother, Paul Wirtz, had a disagreement over costumes with Balls's mother.

She next paired up with Jean-Michel Bombardier. They were assigned to the 1989 Skate America, where they finished 4th in the short program and 5th overall after the free skate. As a singles skater, Ball competed at the 1990 World Junior Championships, held at the end of 1989, where she placed 15th. At the Canadian Championships, the pair placed 5th, and competing in singles, Ball won the bronze medal in the junior division.

The next season, the pair competed at the Grand Prix de St. Gervais, where they placed second in the short program, then rose to win the competition. A week later, they won the Nebelhorn Trophy as well. At Skate America, they placed 5th. They won the bronze medal at the Canadian Championships; competing with Isabelle Brasseur and Lloyd Eisler, they won the four skating title. Ball and Bombadier were subsequently sent to the 1991 World Championships, where they finished in 8th place.

In October 1991, the pair were assigned Skate Canada International. Bombadier competed with an injured thumb on the hand he used to lift Ball. They placed 5th in the short program, then rose to unexpectedly win the event after the free skate, where they portrayed "two persons shipwrecked on an island". They next competed at the Lalique Trophy; after Bombadier fell twice, they finished in 5th.

Heading into Canadian Nationals, Ball expressed hope that she and Bombadier could win one of Canada's places at the upcoming 1992 Winter Olympics. However, she took three weeks off training due to catching pneumonia, and she and Bombadier again placed 5th. In the four skating competition, they won with the same teammates as the year before.

In April, it was announced that Bombadier had begun to practice with Michelle Menzies instead. Ball said she would focus on singles skating; however, she did not rejoin the national team.

Ball now works as a coach.

== Personal life ==
Ball's parents were synchronized skaters who competed on the same team. Her sister, Sherry Ball, was also a competitive skater.

== Results ==
=== Pairs with Bombadier ===
Competition placements between the 1989–1990 and 1991–1992 season
Season	1989–1990	1990–1991	1991–1992
World Championships		8th	
Skate America	5th	5th	
Skate Canada			1st
Lalique Trophy			5th
St. Gervais		1st	
Nebelhorn Trophy		1st	
Canadian Championships	5th	3rd	5th
