= Skate Canada International =

International figure skating competition

- Status: Active
- Genre: Grand Prix competition
- Frequency: Annual
- Country: Canada
- Inaugurated: 1973
- Previous event: 2026 Skate Canada International
- Next event: 2027 Skate Canada International
- Organizer: Skate Canada

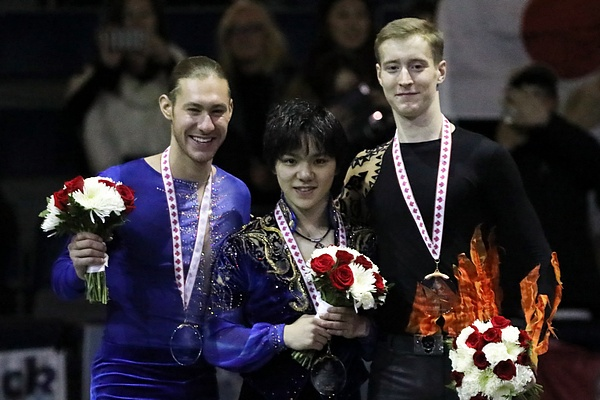
The gold, silver, and bronze medalists in the men's event in 2017: Shoma Uno of Japan (center), Jason Brown of the United States (left), and Alexander Samarin of Russia (right)

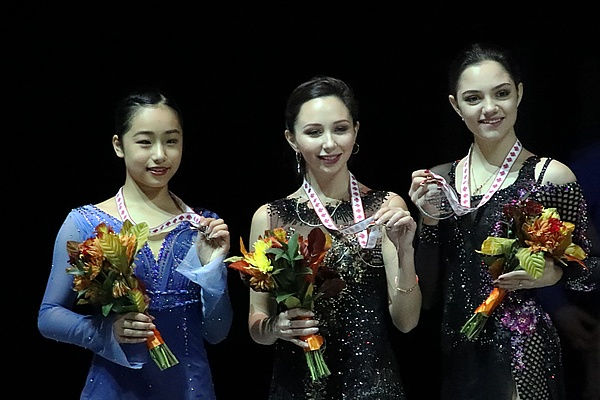
The gold, silver, and bronze medalists in the women's event in 2018: Elizaveta Tuktamysheva of Russia (center), Mako Yamashita of Japan (left), and Evgenia Medvedeva of Russia (right)

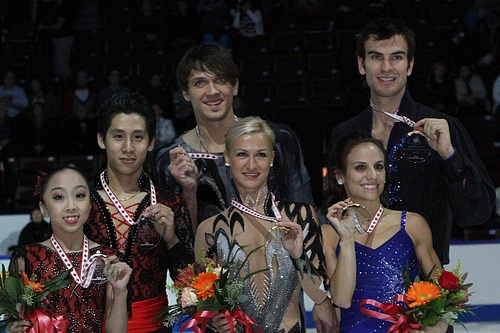
The gold, silver, and bronze medalists in the pairs event in 2011: Tatiana Volosozhar and Maxim Trankov of Russia (center), Sui Wenjing and Han Cong of China (left), and Meagan Duhamel and Eric Radford of Canada (right)

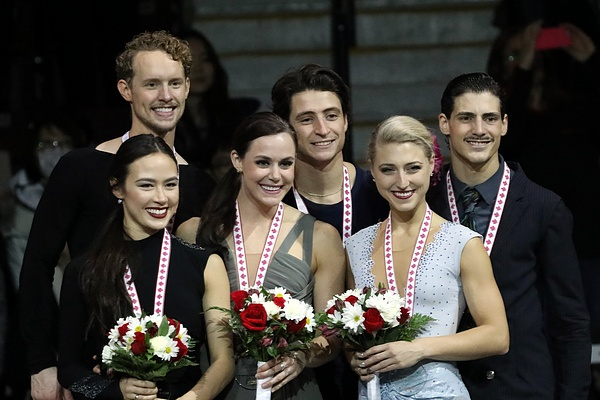
The gold, silver, and bronze medalists in the ice dance event in 2016: Tessa Virtue and Scott Moir of Canada (center), Madison Chock and Evan Bates of the United States (left), and Piper Gilles and Paul Poirier of Canada (right)

Skate Canada International (French: Les Internationaux Patinage Canada) is an annual figure skating competition sanctioned by the International Skating Union (ISU), organized and hosted by Skate Canada. The first Skate Canada competition was held in 1973 in Calgary, Alberta. When the ISU launched the Champions Series (later renamed the Grand Prix of Figure Skating) in 1995, Skate Canada International was one of the five qualifying events. It has been a Grand Prix event every year since, except for 2020, when the event was cancelled due to the COVID-19 pandemic.

Medals are awarded in men's singles, women's singles, pair skating, and ice dance. Skaters earn points based on their results at the qualifying competitions each season, and the top skaters or teams in each discipline are then invited to compete at the Grand Prix of Figure Skating Final. Patrick Chan of Canada currently holds the record for winning the most Skate Canada titles in men's singles (with six), while Michelle Kwan of the United States and Joannie Rochette of Canada are tied for winning the most titles in women's singles (with three each). Two teams are tied for winning the most titles in pair skating (with four each): Meagan Duhamel and Eric Radford of Canada, and Aljona Savchenko and Robin Szolkowy of Germany. Tessa Virtue and Scott Moir of Canada hold the record in ice dance (with seven).

== History ==
Between 1923 and 1971, the Canadian Figure Skating Association, which changed its name to Skate Canada in 2000, and the U.S. Figure Skating Association co-hosted the North American Figure Skating Championships. At this time, medal contenders at the World Figure Skating Championships and the Winter Olympics came from either Europe or North America. The North American Championships allowed Canadian and American skaters the opportunity to compete at a comparable event to the European Figure Skating Championships. The championships were held every other year, with Canada and the United States alternating as hosts, and only skaters from Canada and the United States were eligible to compete.

At a planning meeting held in April 1972, representatives from the Canadian Figure Skating Association announced their intention to withdraw from the North American Championships. With one of the two participating nations out, this effectively marked the end of the championships. The delegation from the U.S. Figure Skating Association was unaware at the time that the Canadian Figure Skating Association was already in the planning stages of launching its own international skating competition.

The first edition of the Skate Canada International, then simply called Skate Canada, was held in 1973 in Calgary, Alberta. Nine countries were invited to participate: Austria, Czechoslovakia, East Germany, France, Great Britain, Japan, the Soviet Union, the United States, and West Germany. Each nation could field one entry in each of three events – men's singles, women's singles, and ice dance – while Canada fielded three entries in each event. Toller Cranston and Lynn Nightingale, both of Canada, won the men's and women's events, respectively, while Hilary Green and Glyn Watts of Great Britain won the ice dance event.

Canada did not hold the competition in 1979 after reaching an agreement with the U.S. Figure Skating Association to accommodate the Olympic test event at Lake Placid, New York, in anticipation of the 1980 Winter Olympics. In 1987, Skate Canada hosted their own test event at the Olympic Saddledome in Calgary, site of the 1988 Winter Olympics.

Compulsory figures, which had been a required element of men's and women's single skating since the beginning, were retired after the 1988 competition. In 1989, Skate Canada unveiled three new events: men's artistic programs, women's artistic programs, and four skating. The artistic events – later rechristened "interpretive programs" – required each skater to present a program of 2 minutes 30 seconds with an emphasis on musical interpretation. No double Axels or triple-rotation jumps were permitted, and skaters had total latitude over their choice of music and costume, even allowing for vocal music, which was not allowed in regular competition at this time. Four skating was not simply two sets of pair skaters performing together; but rather, four individual skaters performing a single routine. This routine included solo jumps, spins, paired throw jumps, paired lifts, paired combination spins, death spirals – all with an exchange of partners – as well as four-person combination spins, lifts, and death spirals. None of these new events remained past 1994.

Beginning with the 1995–96 season, the International Skating Union (ISU) launched the Champions Series – later renamed the Grand Prix Series – which, at its inception, consisted of five qualifying competitions and the Champions Series Final. This allowed skaters the chance to perfect their programs earlier in the season, as well as compete against the skaters whom they would later encounter at the World Figure Skating Championships. This series also provided the viewing public with additional televised skating, which had been in demand. The five qualifying competitions during this inaugural season were the Nations Cup, the NHK Trophy, the Skate America, the Skate Canada, and the Trophée de France. Skaters earned points based on their results in their respective competitions and the top skaters or teams in each discipline were then invited to compete at the Champions Series Final. Skate Canada International has been a qualifying event of the Grand Prix Series every year since, except for 2020, when rising COVID-19 cases in Ontario forced its cancellation. The competition had been scheduled to take place in Ottawa with no audience present, but Skate Canada and city officials ultimately chose to cancel it.

== Medalists ==
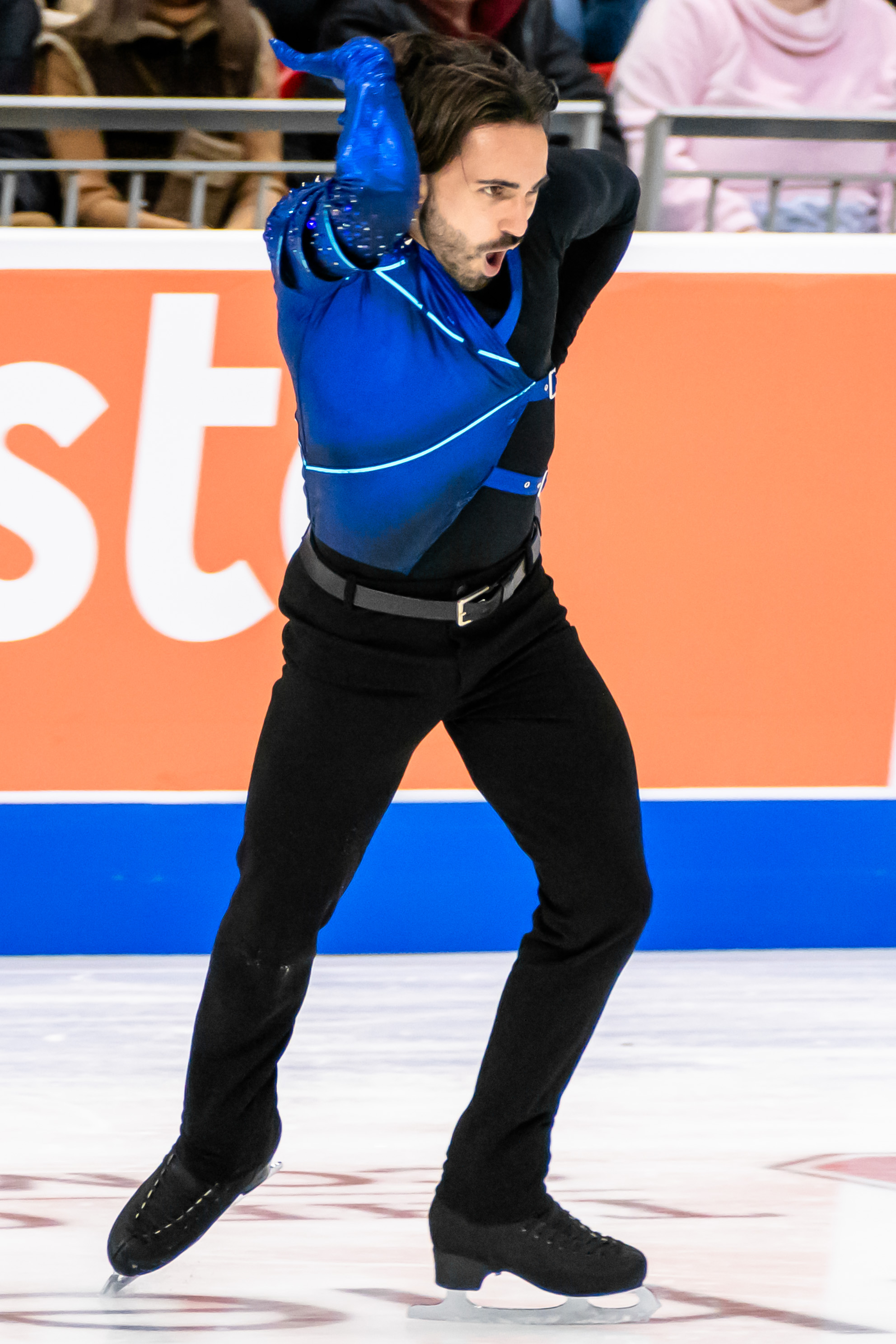
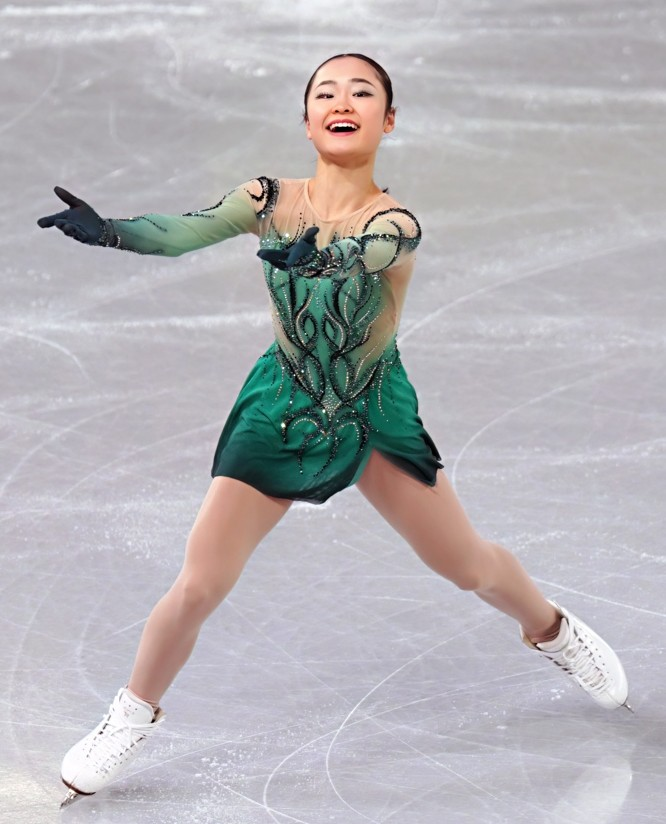
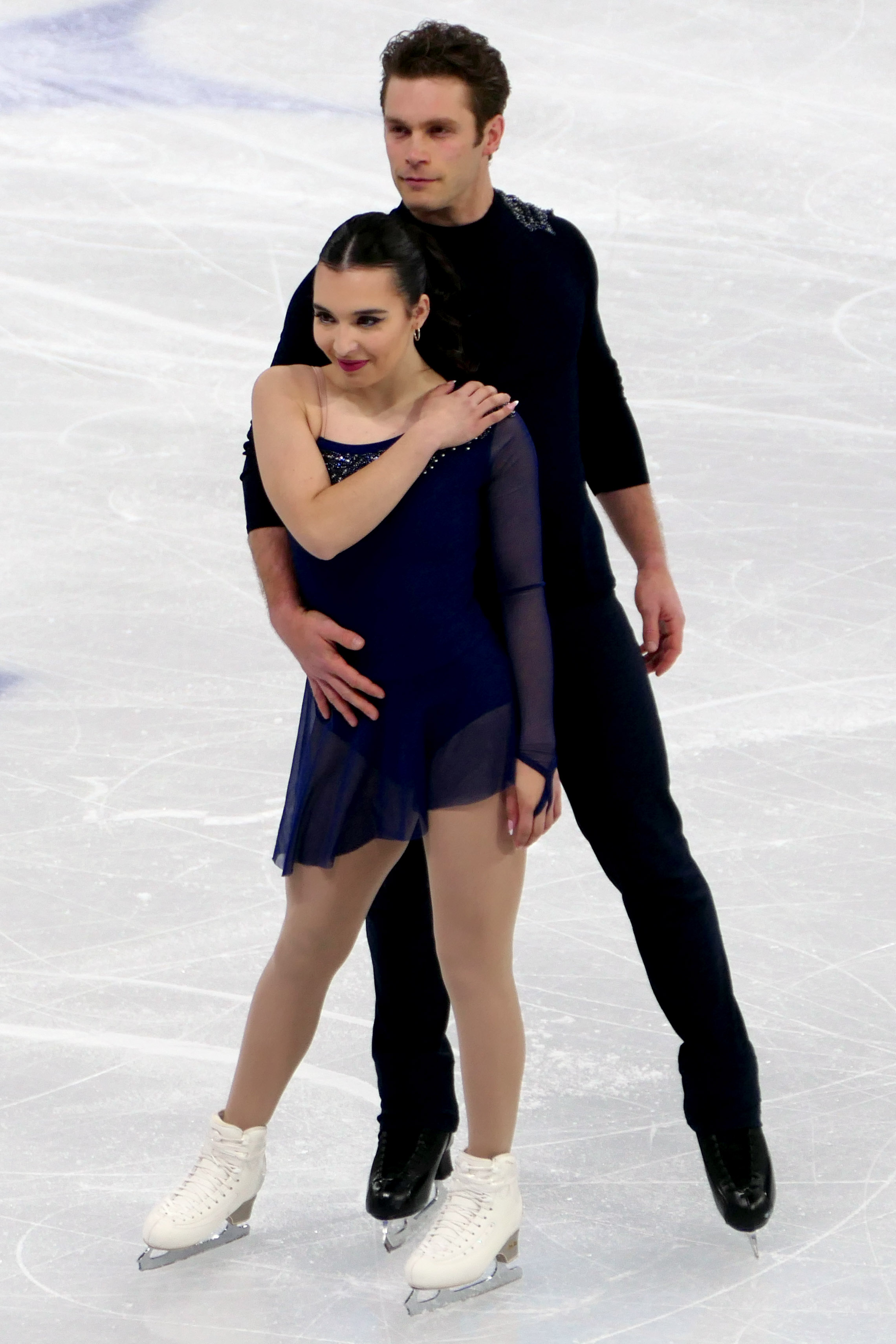
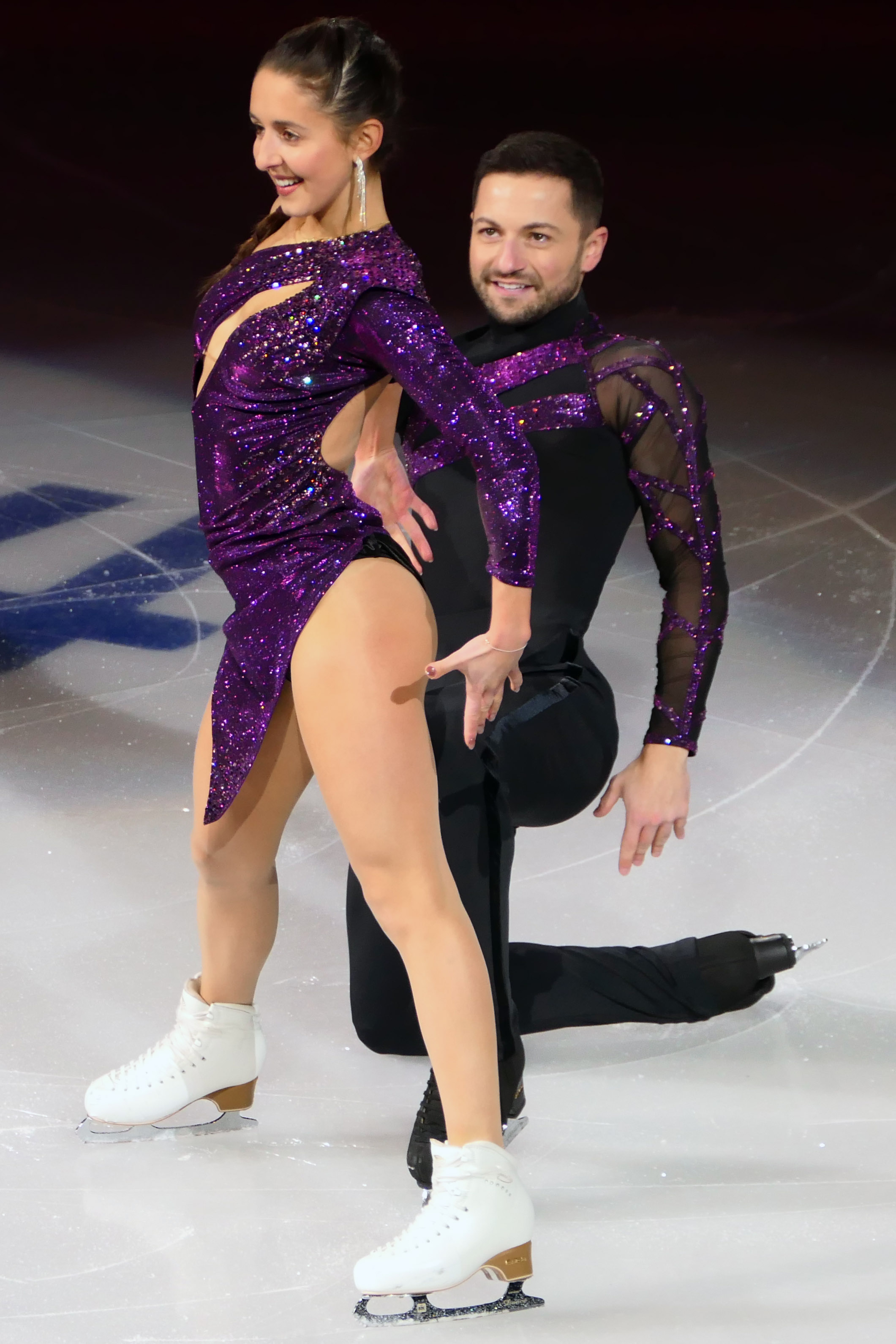
The reigning Skate Canada International champions (from left to right): Kévin Aymoz of France (men's singles); Mao Shimada of Japan (women's singles); Lia Pereira and Trennt Michaud of Canada (pair skating); and Lilah Fear and Lewis Gibson of Great Britain (ice dance)

=== Men's singles ===
Men's event medalists
Year	Location	Gold	Silver	Bronze	Ref.
1973	Calgary	(Canada) Toller Cranston	(Canada) Ron Shaver	(Japan) Minoru Sano	
1974	Kitchener	(Canada) Ron Shaver	(Japan) Minoru Sano	(United States) Charles Tickner	
1975	Edmonton	(Canada) Toller Cranston	(Canada) Ron Shaver	(United States) Terry Kubicka	
1976	Ottawa	(Canada) Ron Shaver	(United Kingdom) Robin Cousins	(United States) David Santee	
1977	Moncton	(United Kingdom) Robin Cousins	(United States) Charles Tickner	(United States) Scott Cramer	
1978	Vancouver	(Japan) Fumio Igarashi	(United States) Charles Tickner	(Canada) Brian Pockar	
1979	No competition held				
1980	Calgary	(United States) Scott Hamilton	(Canada) Brian Pockar	(United States) David Santee	
1981	Ottawa	(West Germany) Norbert Schramm	(Canada) Brian Orser	(Czechoslovakia) Jozef Sabovčík	
1982	Kitchener	(United States) Brian Boitano	(Canada) Brian Orser	(West Germany) Heiko Fischer	
1983	Halifax	(Canada) Brian Orser	(Poland) Grzegorz Filipowski	(Japan) Masaru Ogawa	
1984	Victoria	(Canada) Brian Orser	(Poland) Grzegorz Filipowski	(Japan) Masaru Ogawa	
1985	London	(Czechoslovakia) Jozef Sabovčík	(United States) Scott Williams	(Poland) Grzegorz Filipowski	
1986	Regina	(Soviet Union) Vitali Egorov	(United States) Christopher Bowman	(Poland) Grzegorz Filipowski	
1987	Calgary	(Canada) Brian Orser	(United States) Brian Boitano	(Soviet Union) Viktor Petrenko	
1988	Thunder Bay	(Canada) Kurt Browning	(Soviet Union) Viktor Petrenko	(United States) Angelo D'Agostino	
1989	Cornwall	(Czechoslovakia) Petr Barna	(United States) Paul Wylie	(West Germany) Daniel Weiss	
1990	Lethbridge	(Canada) Kurt Browning	(Poland) Grzegorz Filipowski	(United States) Mark Mitchell	
1991	London	(Canada) Elvis Stojko	(Soviet Union) Vasili Eremenko	(United States) Paul Wylie	
1992	Victoria	(Canada) Elvis Stojko	(United States) Scott Davis	(France) Éric Millot	
1993	Ottawa	(Canada) Kurt Browning	(United States) Mark Mitchell	(United Kingdom) Steven Cousins	
1994	Red Deer	(Canada) Elvis Stojko	(Israel) Michael Shmerkin	(Canada) Sébastien Britten	
1995	Saint John	(Russia) Alexei Urmanov	(Israel) Michael Shmerkin	(France) Éric Millot	
1996	Kitchener	(Canada) Elvis Stojko	(Russia) Ilia Kulik	(United States) Scott Davis	
1997	Halifax	(Canada) Elvis Stojko	(Russia) Ilia Kulik	(Denmark) Michael Tyllesen	
1998	Kamloops	(Russia) Evgeni Plushenko	(Canada) Elvis Stojko	(Hungary) Szabolcs Vidrai	
1999	Saint John	(Russia) Alexei Yagudin	(Canada) Elvis Stojko	(Japan) Takeshi Honda	
2000	Mississauga	(Russia) Alexei Yagudin	(United States) Todd Eldredge	(United States) Matthew Savoie	
2001	Saskatoon	(Russia) Alexei Yagudin	(Canada) Elvis Stojko	(United States) Todd Eldredge	
2002	Quebec City	(Japan) Takeshi Honda	(Canada) Emanuel Sandhu	(Russia) Stanislav Timchenko	
2003	Mississauga	(Russia) Evgeni Plushenko	(Canada) Jeffrey Buttle	(Japan) Takeshi Honda	
2004	Halifax	(Canada) Emanuel Sandhu	(Canada) Ben Ferreira	(Canada) Jeffrey Buttle	
2005	St. John's	(Canada) Emanuel Sandhu	(Canada) Jeffrey Buttle	(Japan) Nobunari Oda	
2006	Victoria	(Switzerland) Stéphane Lambiel	(Japan) Daisuke Takahashi	(United States) Johnny Weir	
2007	Quebec City	(France) Brian Joubert	(Belgium) Kevin van der Perren	(Canada) Jeffrey Buttle	
2008	Ottawa	(Canada) Patrick Chan	(United States) Ryan Bradley	(United States) Evan Lysacek	
2009	Kitchener	(United States) Jeremy Abbott	(Japan) Daisuke Takahashi	(France) Alban Préaubert	
2010	Kingston	(Canada) Patrick Chan	(Japan) Nobunari Oda	(United States) Adam Rippon	
2011	Mississauga	(Canada) Patrick Chan	(Spain) Javier Fernández	(Japan) Daisuke Takahashi	
2012	Windsor	(Spain) Javier Fernández	(Canada) Patrick Chan	(Japan) Nobunari Oda	
2013	Saint John	(Canada) Patrick Chan	(Japan) Yuzuru Hanyu	(Japan) Nobunari Oda	
2014	Kelowna	(Japan) Takahito Mura	(Spain) Javier Fernández	(United States) Max Aaron	
2015	Lethbridge	(Canada) Patrick Chan	(Japan) Yuzuru Hanyu	(Japan) Daisuke Murakami	
2016	Mississauga	(Canada) Patrick Chan	(Japan) Yuzuru Hanyu	(Canada) Kevin Reynolds	
2017	Regina	(Japan) Shoma Uno	(United States) Jason Brown	(Russia) Alexander Samarin	
2018	Laval	(Japan) Shoma Uno	(Canada) Keegan Messing	(South Korea) Cha Jun-hwan	
2019	Kelowna	(Japan) Yuzuru Hanyu	(Canada) Nam Nguyen	(Japan) Keiji Tanaka	
2020	Ottawa	Competition cancelled due to the COVID-19 pandemic			
2021	Vancouver	(United States) Nathan Chen	(United States) Jason Brown	(Russia) Evgeni Semenenko	
2022	Mississauga	(Japan) Shoma Uno	(Japan) Kao Miura	(Italy) Matteo Rizzo	
2023	Vancouver	(Japan) Sōta Yamamoto	(Japan) Kao Miura	(Italy) Matteo Rizzo	
2024	Halifax	(United States) Ilia Malinin	(Japan) Shun Sato	(South Korea) Cha Jun-hwan	
2025	Saskatoon	(United States) Ilia Malinin	(Estonia) Aleksandr Selevko	(Japan) Kao Miura	
2026	Kelowna	(France) Kévin Aymoz	(Japan) Rio Nakata	(Estonia) Mihhail Selevko	

=== Women's singles ===
Women's event medalists
Year	Location	Gold	Silver	Bronze	Ref.
1973	Calgary	(Canada) Lynn Nightingale	(Canada) Barbara Terpenning	(United Kingdom) Jean Scott	
1974	Kitchener	(Canada) Lynn Nightingale	(East Germany) Anett Pötzsch	(United States) Wendy Burge	
1975	Edmonton	(Italy) Susanna Driano	(United States) Kath Malmberg	(Japan) Emi Watanabe	
1976	Ottawa	(Canada) Kim Alletson	(United Kingdom) Karena Richardson	(Germany) Garnet Ostermeier	
1977	Moncton	(United States) Linda Fratianne	(United States) Lisa-Marie Allen	(Canada) Heather Kemkaran	
1978	Vancouver	(United States) Lisa-Marie Allen	(Austria) Claudia Kristofics-Binder	(Finland) Kristiina Wegelius	
1979	No competition held				
1980	Calgary	(United States) Elaine Zayak	(Canada) Tracey Wainman	(Austria) Claudia Kristofics-Binder	
1981	Ottawa	(Canada) Tracey Wainman	(United States) Rosalynn Sumners	(Soviet Union) Kira Ivanova	
1982	Kitchener	(United States) Vikki De Vries	(Finland) Kristiina Wegelius	(United States) Rosalynn Sumners	
1983	Halifax	(East Germany) Katarina Witt	(Canada) Kay Thomson	(United States) Tiffany Chin	
1984	Victoria	(Japan) Midori Ito	(United States) Tiffany Chin	(Soviet Union) Natalia Lebedeva	
1985	London	(United States) Caryn Kadavy	(Canada) Elizabeth Manley	(West Germany) Patricia Neske	
1986	Regina	(Canada) Elizabeth Manley	(West Germany) Claudia Leistner	(United Kingdom) Joanne Conway	
1987	Calgary	(United States) Debi Thomas	(Canada) Elizabeth Manley	(United Kingdom) Joanne Conway	
1988	Thunder Bay	(Soviet Union) Natalia Lebedeva	(United States) Jill Trenary	(West Germany) Patricia Neske	
1989	Cornwall	(United States) Kristi Yamaguchi	(East Germany) Simone Lang	(Soviet Union) Natalia Lebedeva	
1990	Lethbridge	(Canada) Josée Chouinard	(Canada) Lisa Sargeant	(United States) Holly Cook	
1991	London	(France) Surya Bonaly	(Germany) Marina Kielmann	(Canada) Karen Preston	
1992	Victoria	(Russia) Maria Butyrskaya	(Belgium) Alice Sue Claeys	(Canada) Josée Chouinard	
1993	Ottawa	(China) Chen Lu	(Russia) Olga Markova	(Canada) Karen Preston	
1994	Red Deer	(Hungary) Krisztina Czakó	(France) Laëtitia Hubert	(United States) Jessica Mills	
1995	Saint John	(United States) Michelle Kwan	(Japan) Hanae Yokoya	(Canada) Josée Chouinard	
1996	Kitchener	(Russia) Irina Slutskaya	(United States) Tara Lipinski	(Switzerland) Lucinda Ruh	
1997	Halifax	(United States) Michelle Kwan	(Russia) Maria Butyrskaya	(France) Surya Bonaly	
1998	Kamloops	(Ukraine) Elena Liashenko	(Japan) Fumie Suguri	(Russia) Irina Slutskaya	
1999	Saint John	(United States) Michelle Kwan	(Russia) Julia Soldatova	(Canada) Jennifer Robinson	
2000	Mississauga	(Russia) Irina Slutskaya	(United States) Michelle Kwan	(Japan) Fumie Suguri	
2001	Saskatoon	(United States) Sarah Hughes	(Russia) Irina Slutskaya	(United States) Michelle Kwan	
2002	Quebec City	(United States) Sasha Cohen	(Japan) Fumie Suguri	(Russia) Viktoria Volchkova	
2003	Mississauga	(United States) Sasha Cohen	(Japan) Shizuka Arakawa	(Hungary) Júlia Sebestyén	
2004	Halifax	(Canada) Cynthia Phaneuf	(Japan) Yoshie Onda	(Finland) Susanna Pöykiö	
2005	St. John's	(United States) Alissa Czisny	(Canada) Joannie Rochette	(Japan) Yukari Nakano	
2006	Victoria	(Canada) Joannie Rochette	(Japan) Fumie Suguri	(South Korea) Yuna Kim	
2007	Quebec City	(Japan) Mao Asada	(Japan) Yukari Nakano	(Canada) Joannie Rochette	
2008	Ottawa	(Canada) Joannie Rochette	(Japan) Fumie Suguri	(United States) Alissa Czisny	
2009	Kitchener	(Canada) Joannie Rochette	(United States) Alissa Czisny	(Finland) Laura Lepistö	
2010	Kingston	(United States) Alissa Czisny	(Russia) Ksenia Makarova	(Canada) Amélie Lacoste	
2011	Mississauga	(Russia) Elizaveta Tuktamysheva	(Japan) Akiko Suzuki	(United States) Ashley Wagner	
2012	Windsor	(Canada) Kaetlyn Osmond	(Japan) Akiko Suzuki	(Japan) Kanako Murakami	
2013	Saint John	(Russia) Yulia Lipnitskaya	(Japan) Akiko Suzuki	(United States) Gracie Gold	
2014	Kelowna	(Russia) Anna Pogorilaya	(United States) Ashley Wagner	(Japan) Satoko Miyahara	
2015	Lethbridge	(United States) Ashley Wagner	(Russia) Elizaveta Tuktamysheva	(Japan) Yuka Nagai	
2016	Mississauga	(Russia) Evgenia Medvedeva	(Canada) Kaetlyn Osmond	(Japan) Satoko Miyahara	
2017	Regina	(Canada) Kaetlyn Osmond	(Russia) Maria Sotskova	(United States) Ashley Wagner	
2018	Laval	(Russia) Elizaveta Tuktamysheva	(Japan) Mako Yamashita	(Russia) Evgenia Medvedeva	
2019	Kelowna	(Russia) Alexandra Trusova	(Japan) Rika Kihira	(South Korea) You Young	
2020	Ottawa	Competition cancelled due to the COVID-19 pandemic			
2021	Vancouver	(Russia) Kamila Valieva	(Russia) Elizaveta Tuktamysheva	(Russia) Alena Kostornaia	
2022	Mississauga	(Japan) Rinka Watanabe	(United States) Starr Andrews	(South Korea) You Young	
2023	Vancouver	(Japan) Kaori Sakamoto	(South Korea) Kim Chae-yeon	(Japan) Rino Matsuike	
2024	Halifax	(Japan) Kaori Sakamoto	(Japan) Rino Matsuike	(Japan) Hana Yoshida	
2025	Saskatoon	(Japan) Mone Chiba	(United States) Isabeau Levito	(Japan) Ami Nakai	
2026	Kelowna	(Japan) Mao Shimada	(Estonia) Niina Petrõkina	(United States) Isabeau Levito	

=== Pairs ===
Pairs event medalists
Year	Location	Gold	Silver	Bronze	Ref.
1984	Victoria	(Soviet Union); Elena Bechke; Valeri Kornienko	(Canada); Cynthia Coull; Mark Rowsom	(Canada); Katherina Matousek; Lloyd Eisler	
1985	London	(Soviet Union); Ekaterina Gordeeva; Sergei Grinkov	(Soviet Union); Veronika Pershina; Marat Akbarov	(Canada); Denise Benning; Lyndon Johnston	
1986	Regina	(Canada); Cynthia Coull; Mark Rowsom	(Soviet Union); Ekaterina Gordeeva; Sergei Grinkov	(United States); Natalie Seybold; Wayne Seybold	
1987	Calgary	(Canada); Christine Hough; Doug Ladret	(Soviet Union); Elena Kvitchenko; Rashid Kadyrkaev	(United States); Katy Keeley; Joseph Mero	
1988	Thunder Bay	(Canada); Isabelle Brasseur; Lloyd Eisler	(East Germany); Peggy Schwarz; Alexander König	(Soviet Union); Ekaterina Murugova; Artem Torgashev	
1989	Cornwall	(Soviet Union); Elena Leonova; Gennadi Krasnitski	(Canada); Cindy Landry; Lyndon Johnston	(Canada); Michelle Menzies; Kevin Wheeler	
1990	Lethbridge	(Canada); Isabelle Brasseur; Lloyd Eisler	(Soviet Union); Evgenia Shishkova; Vadim Naumov	(Canada); Michelle Menzies; Kevin Wheeler	
1991	London	(Canada); Stacey Ball; Jean-Michel Bombardier	(Canada); Michelle Menzies; Kevin Wheeler	(Soviet Union); Marina Eltsova; Andrei Bushkov	
1992	Victoria	(Germany); Mandy Wötzel; Ingo Steuer	(Canada); Michelle Menzies; Jean-Michel Bombardier	(Australia); Danielle Carr; Stephen Carr	
1993	Ottawa	(Russia); Ekaterina Gordeeva; Sergei Grinkov	(Czech Republic); Radka Kovaříková; René Novotný	(Canada); Michelle Menzies; Jean-Michel Bombardier	
1994	Red Deer	(Canada); Kristy Sargeant; Kris Wirtz	(Latvia); Elena Berezhnaya; Oleg Shliakhov	(France); Sarah Abitbol; Stéphane Bernadis	
1995	Saint John	(Russia); Evgenia Shishkova; Vadim Naumov	(Russia); Maria Petrova; Anton Sikharulidze	(Canada); Jodeyne Higgins; Sean Rice	
1996	Kitchener	(Germany); Mandy Wötzel; Ingo Steuer	(Russia); Marina Eltsova; Andrei Bushkov	(United States); Kyoko Ina; Jason Dungjen	
1997	Halifax	(Russia); Oksana Kazakova; Artur Dmitriev	(Kazakhstan); Marina Khalturina; Andrei Kroukov	(France); Sarah Abitbol; Stéphane Bernadis	
1998	Kamloops	(China); Shen Xue; Zhao Hongbo	(Russia); Maria Petrova; Alexei Tikhonov	(Canada); Jamie Salé; David Pelletier	
1999	Saint John	(Russia); Elena Berezhnaya; Anton Sikharulidze	(United States); Kyoko Ina; John Zimmerman	(Canada); Kristy Wirtz; Kris Wirtz	
2000	Mississauga	(Canada); Jamie Salé; David Pelletier	(Russia); Elena Berezhnaya; Anton Sikharulidze	(Russia); Maria Petrova; Alexei Tikhonov	
2001	Saskatoon	(Canada); Jamie Salé; David Pelletier	(Russia); Tatiana Totmianina; Maxim Marinin	(Canada); Anabelle Langlois; Patrice Archetto	
2002	Quebec City	(Russia); Tatiana Totmianina; Maxim Marinin	(China); Pang Qing; Tong Jian	(Canada); Anabelle Langlois; Patrice Archetto	
2003	Mississauga	(Russia); Tatiana Totmianina; Maxim Marinin	(China); Shen Xue; Zhao Hongbo	(Poland); Dorota Zagórska; Mariusz Siudek	
2004	Halifax	(China); Shen Xue; Zhao Hongbo	(China); Pang Qing; Tong Jian	(Poland); Dorota Zagórska; Mariusz Siudek	
2005	St. John's	(Germany); Aljona Savchenko; Robin Szolkowy	(Russia); Maria Petrova; Alexei Tikhonov	(Canada); Valérie Marcoux; Craig Buntin	
2006	Victoria	(China); Zhang Dan; Zhang Hao	(United States); Rena Inoue; John Baldwin	(Canada); Valérie Marcoux; Craig Buntin	
2007	Quebec City	(Germany); Aljona Savchenko; Robin Szolkowy	(Canada); Jessica Dubé; Bryce Davison	(Russia); Yuko Kawaguchi; Alexander Smirnov	
2008	Ottawa	(Russia); Yuko Kawaguchi; Alexander Smirnov	(Canada); Jessica Dubé; Bryce Davison	(United States); Keauna McLaughlin; Rockne Brubaker	
2009	Kitchener	(Germany); Aljona Savchenko; Robin Szolkowy	(Russia); Maria Mukhortova; Maxim Trankov	(Canada); Jessica Dubé; Bryce Davison	
2010	Kingston	(Russia); Lubov Iliushechkina; Nodari Maisuradze	(Canada); Kirsten Moore-Towers; Dylan Moscovitch	(Canada); Paige Lawrence; Rudi Swiegers	
2011	Mississauga	(Russia); Tatiana Volosozhar; Maxim Trankov	(China); Sui Wenjing; Han Cong	(Canada); Meagan Duhamel; Eric Radford	
2012	Windsor	(Germany); Aljona Savchenko; Robin Szolkowy	(Canada); Meagan Duhamel; Eric Radford	(Italy); Stefania Berton; Ondřej Hotárek	
2013	Saint John	(Italy); Stefania Berton; Ondřej Hotárek	(China); Sui Wenjing; Han Cong	(Canada); Meagan Duhamel; Eric Radford	
2014	Kelowna	(Canada); Meagan Duhamel; Eric Radford	(China); Sui Wenjing; Han Cong	(Russia); Evgenia Tarasova; Vladimir Morozov	
2015	Lethbridge	(Canada); Meagan Duhamel; Eric Radford	(Russia); Evgenia Tarasova; Vladimir Morozov	(Canada); Kirsten Moore-Towers; Michael Marinaro	
2016	Mississauga	(Canada); Meagan Duhamel; Eric Radford	(China); Yu Xiaoyu; Zhang Hao	(Canada); Liubov Ilyushechkina; Dylan Moscovitch	
2017	Regina	(Canada); Meagan Duhamel; Eric Radford	(Germany); Aljona Savchenko; Bruno Massot	(France); Vanessa James; Morgan Ciprès	
2018	Laval	(France); Vanessa James; Morgan Ciprès	(China); Peng Cheng; Jin Yang	(Canada); Kirsten Moore-Towers; Michael Marinaro	
2019	Kelowna	(Russia); Aleksandra Boikova; Dmitrii Kozlovskii	(Canada); Kirsten Moore-Towers; Michael Marinaro	(Russia); Evgenia Tarasova; Vladimir Morozov	
2020	Ottawa	Competition cancelled due to the COVID-19 pandemic			
2021	Vancouver	(China); Sui Wenjing; Han Cong	(Russia); Daria Pavliuchenko; Denis Khodykin	(United States); Ashley Cain-Gribble; Timothy LeDuc	
2022	Mississauga	(Japan); Riku Miura; Ryuichi Kihara	(United States); Emily Chan; Spencer Akira Howe	(Italy); Sara Conti; Niccolò Macii	
2023	Vancouver	(Canada); Deanna Stellato-Dudek; Maxime Deschamps	(Hungary); Maria Pavlova; Alexei Sviatchenko	(Italy); Lucrezia Beccari; Matteo Guarise	
2024	Halifax	(Canada); Deanna Stellato-Dudek; Maxime Deschamps	(Uzbekistan); Ekaterina Geynish; Dmitrii Chigirev	(Australia); Anastasia Golubeva; Hektor Giotopoulos Moore	
2025	Saskatoon	(Canada); Deanna Stellato-Dudek; Maxime Deschamps	(Germany); Minerva Fabienne Hase; Nikita Volodin	(United States); Ellie Kam; Daniel O'Shea	
2026	Kelowna	(Canada); Lia Pereira; Trennt Michaud	(United States); Alisa Efimova; Misha Mitrofanov	(Switzerland); Oxana Vouillamoz; Tom Bouvart	

=== Ice dance ===
Ice dance event medalists
Year	Location	Gold	Silver	Bronze	Ref.
1973	Calgary	(United Kingdom); Hilary Green; Glyn Watts	(Canada); Louise Soper; Barry Soper	(Soviet Union); Irina Moiseeva; Andrei Minenkov	
1974	Kitchener	(Soviet Union); Irina Moiseeva; Andrei Minenkov	(United States); Colleen O'Connor; Jim Millns	(United Kingdom); Janet Thompson; Warren Maxwell	
1975	Edmonton	(Soviet Union); Natalia Linichuk; Gennadi Karponosov	(Canada); Barbara Berezowski; David Porter	(Italy); Matilde Ciccia; Lamberto Ceserani	
1976	Ottawa	(Soviet Union); Natalia Linichuk; Gennadi Karponosov	(United Kingdom); Janet Thompson; Warren Maxwell	(Canada); Susan Carscallen; Eric Gillies	
1977	Moncton	(United Kingdom); Janet Thompson; Warren Maxwell	(Soviet Union); Marina Zueva; Andrei Vitman	(Canada); Lorna Wighton; John Dowding	
1978	Vancouver	(Hungary); Krisztina Regőczy; András Sallay	(Canada); Lorna Wighton; John Dowding	(Soviet Union); Marina Zueva; Andrei Vitman	
1979	No competition held				
1980	Calgary	(United States); Judy Blumberg; Michael Seibert	(United Kingdom); Karen Barber; Nicky Slater	(Canada); Marie McNeill; Rob McCall	
1981	Ottawa	(United States); Carol Fox; Richard Dalley	(United Kingdom); Karen Barber; Nicky Slater	(Soviet Union); Natalia Karamysheva; Rostislav Sinitsyn	
1982	Kitchener	(United States); Elisa Spitz; Scott Gregory	(Canada); Tracy Wilson; Rob McCall	(Soviet Union); Natalia Annenko; Genrikh Sretenski	
1983	Halifax	(Canada); Tracy Wilson; Rob McCall	(United Kingdom); Wendy Sessions; Stephen Williams	(Soviet Union); Natalia Annenko; Genrikh Sretenski	
1984	Victoria	(Soviet Union); Olga Volozhinskaya; Alexander Svinin	(West Germany); Petra Born; Rainer Schönborn	(Canada); Kelly Johnson; John Thomas	
1985	London	(United States); Renée Roca; Donald Adair	(Soviet Union); Olga Volozhinskaya; Alexander Svinin	(Austria); Kathrin Beck; Christoff Beck	
1986	Regina	(Soviet Union); Natalia Annenko; Genrikh Sretenski	(United States); Suzanne Semanick; Scott Gregory	(Canada); Karyn Garossino; Rod Garossino	
1987	Calgary	(Canada); Tracy Wilson; Rob McCall	(Austria); Kathrin Beck; Christoff Beck	(Italy); Lia Trovati; Roberto Pelizzola	
1988	Thunder Bay	(Soviet Union); Natalia Annenko; Genrikh Sretenski	(United States); April Sargent; Russ Witherby	(Canada); Melanie Cole; Michael Farrington	
1989	Cornwall	(United States); Suzanne Semanick; Ron Kravette	(Canada); Michelle McDonald; Mark Mitchell	(Canada); Jacqueline Petr; Mark Janoschak	
1990	Lethbridge	(Canada); Jacqueline Petr; Mark Janoschak	(Soviet Union); Irina Romanova; Igor Yaroshenko	(Poland); Małgorzata Grajcar; Andrzej Dostatni	
1991	London	(Italy); Stefania Calegari; Pasquale Camerlengo	(France); Sophie Moniotte; Pascal Lavanchy	(Czech Republic); Kateřina Mrázová; Martin Šimeček	
1992	Victoria	(Finland); Susanna Rahkamo; Petri Kokko	(Russia); Yaroslava Nechaeva; Yuri Chesnichenko	(Czech Republic); Kateřina Mrázová; Martin Šimeček	
1993	Ottawa	(France); Sophie Moniotte; Pascal Lavanchy	(Belarus); Tatiana Navka; Samuel Gezolian	(Canada); Shae-Lynn Bourne; Victor Kraatz	
1994	Red Deer	(Canada); Shae-Lynn Bourne; Victor Kraatz	(Lithuania); Margarita Drobiazko; Povilas Vanagas	(United States); Renée Roca; Gorsha Sur	
1995	Saint John	(Canada); Shae-Lynn Bourne; Victor Kraatz	(France); Marina Anissina; Gwendal Peizerat	(Ukraine); Irina Romanova; Igor Yaroshenko	
1996	Kitchener	(Canada); Shae-Lynn Bourne; Victor Kraatz	(France); Marina Anissina; Gwendal Peizerat	(Italy); Barbara Fusar-Poli; Maurizio Margaglio	
1997	Halifax	(Canada); Shae-Lynn Bourne; Victor Kraatz	(United States); Elizabeth Punsalan; Jerod Swallow	(Russia); Irina Lobacheva; Ilia Averbukh	
1998	Kamloops	(Canada); Shae-Lynn Bourne; Victor Kraatz	(Lithuania); Margarita Drobiazko; Povilas Vanagas	(Poland); Sylwia Nowak; Sebastian Kolasiński	
1999	Saint John	(Lithuania); Margarita Drobiazko; Povilas Vanagas	(Ukraine); Elena Grushina; Ruslan Goncharov	(France); Isabelle Delobel; Olivier Schoenfelder	
2000	Mississauga	(France); Marina Anissina; Gwendal Peizerat	(Israel); Galit Chait; Sergei Sakhnovski	(Canada); Marie-France Dubreuil; Patrice Lauzon	
2001	Saskatoon	(Canada); Shae-Lynn Bourne; Victor Kraatz	(Israel); Galit Chait; Sergei Sakhnovski	(France); Isabelle Delobel; Olivier Schoenfelder	
2002	Quebec City	(Ukraine); Elena Grushina; Ruslan Goncharov	(Canada); Marie-France Dubreuil; Patrice Lauzon	(Russia); Svetlana Kulikova; Arseni Markov	
2003	Mississauga	(Russia); Tatiana Navka; Roman Kostomarov	(Bulgaria); Albena Denkova; Maxim Staviyski	(Canada); Marie-France Dubreuil; Patrice Lauzon	
2004	Halifax	(Bulgaria); Albena Denkova; Maxim Staviyski	(Canada); Marie-France Dubreuil; Patrice Lauzon	(Israel); Galit Chait; Sergei Sakhnovski	
2005	St. John's	(Canada); Marie-France Dubreuil; Patrice Lauzon	(Ukraine); Elena Grushina; Ruslan Goncharov	(United States); Melissa Gregory; Denis Petukhov	
2006	Victoria	(Canada); Marie-France Dubreuil; Patrice Lauzon	(Canada); Tessa Virtue; Scott Moir	(Italy); Federica Faiella; Massimo Scali	
2007	Quebec City	(Canada); Tessa Virtue; Scott Moir	(Italy); Anna Cappellini; Luca Lanotte	(France); Pernelle Carron; Matthieu Jost	
2008	Ottawa	(United States); Meryl Davis; Charlie White	(Canada); Vanessa Crone; Paul Poirier	(France); Nathalie Péchalat; Fabian Bourzat	
2009	Kitchener	(Canada); Tessa Virtue; Scott Moir	(France); Nathalie Péchalat; Fabian Bourzat	(Canada); Kaitlyn Weaver; Andrew Poje	
2010	Kingston	(Canada); Vanessa Crone; Paul Poirier	(United Kingdom); Sinead Kerr; John Kerr	(United States); Madison Chock; Greg Zuerlein	
2011	Mississauga	(Canada); Tessa Virtue; Scott Moir	(Canada); Kaitlyn Weaver; Andrew Poje	(Italy); Anna Cappellini; Luca Lanotte	
2012	Windsor	(Canada); Tessa Virtue; Scott Moir	(Italy); Anna Cappellini; Luca Lanotte	(Russia); Ekaterina Riazanova; Ilia Tkachenko	
2013	Saint John	(Canada); Tessa Virtue; Scott Moir	(Canada); Kaitlyn Weaver; Andrew Poje	(United States); Madison Hubbell; Zachary Donohue	
2014	Kelowna	(Canada); Kaitlyn Weaver; Andrew Poje	(Canada); Piper Gilles; Paul Poirier	(United States); Madison Hubbell; Zachary Donohue	
2015	Lethbridge	(Canada); Kaitlyn Weaver; Andrew Poje	(United States); Maia Shibutani; Alex Shibutani	(Russia); Ekaterina Bobrova; Dmitri Soloviev	
2016	Mississauga	(Canada); Tessa Virtue; Scott Moir	(United States); Madison Chock; Evan Bates	(Canada); Piper Gilles; Paul Poirier	
2017	Regina	(Canada); Tessa Virtue; Scott Moir	(Canada); Kaitlyn Weaver; Andrew Poje	(United States); Madison Hubbell; Zachary Donohue	
2018	Laval	(United States); Madison Hubbell; Zachary Donohue	(Russia); Victoria Sinitsina; Nikita Katsalapov	(Canada); Piper Gilles; Paul Poirier	
2019	Kelowna	(Canada); Piper Gilles; Paul Poirier	(United States); Madison Hubbell; Zachary Donohue	(United Kingdom); Lilah Fear; Lewis Gibson	
2020	Ottawa	Competition cancelled due to the COVID-19 pandemic			
2021	Vancouver	(Canada); Piper Gilles; Paul Poirier	(Italy); Charlène Guignard; Marco Fabbri	(Spain); Olivia Smart; Adrián Díaz	
2022	Mississauga	(Canada); Piper Gilles; Paul Poirier	(United Kingdom); Lilah Fear; Lewis Gibson	(Canada); Marjorie Lajoie; Zachary Lagha	
2023	Vancouver	(Canada); Piper Gilles; Paul Poirier	(United Kingdom); Lilah Fear; Lewis Gibson	(Lithuania); Allison Reed; Saulius Ambrulevičius	
2024	Halifax	(Canada); Piper Gilles; Paul Poirier	(Canada); Marjorie Lajoie; Zachary Lagha	(France); Evgeniia Lopareva; Geoffrey Brissaud	
2025	Saskatoon	(Canada); Piper Gilles; Paul Poirier	(Lithuania); Allison Reed; Saulius Ambrulevičius	(Canada); Marjorie Lajoie; Zachary Lagha	
2026	Kelowna	(United Kingdom); Lilah Fear; Lewis Gibson	(France); Evgeniia Lopareva; Geoffrey Brissaud	(United States); Caroline Green; Michael Parsons	

== Discontinued events ==
=== Men's interpretive program ===
Year	Location	Gold	Silver	Bronze	Ref.
1989	Cornwall	(West Germany) Daniel Weiss	(United States) Paul Wylie	(Canada) Norm Proft	
1990	Lethbridge	(Canada) Steven Bélanger	(West Germany) Daniel Weiss	(Australia) Cameron Medhurst	
1991	London	(Germany) Daniel Weiss	(Chinese Taipei) David Liu	(Canada) Bill Bridel	
1992	Victoria	(Chinese Taipei) David Liu	(United States) Troy Goldstein & (Denmark) Henrik Walentin (tied)	No bronze medal awarded	
1993	Ottawa	No interpretive programs			
1994	Red Deer	(Germany) Daniel Weiss	(Chinese Taipei) David Liu	(Denmark) Henrik Walentin	

=== Women's interpretive program ===
Year	Location	Gold	Silver	Bronze	Ref.
1989	Cornwall	(Japan) Yukiko Kashihara	(Canada) Dianne Takeuchi	(United States) Jenni Meno	
1990	Lethbridge	(United States) Joanna Ng	(Canada) Trudy Treslan	(Denmark) Anisette Torp-Lind	
1991	London	(Canada) Laurie Palmer	(Denmark) Anisette Torp-Lind	(United States) Leana Naczynski	
1992	Victoria	(Russia) Maria Butyrskaya	(Japan) Junko Yaginuma	(Canada) Robin Johnstone	
1993	Ottawa	No interpretive programs			
1994	Red Deer	No women's interpretive programs			

=== Four skating ===
Year	Location	Gold	Silver	Bronze	Ref.
1989	Cornwall	(Canada): Christine Hough; Doug Ladret; Cindy Landry; Lyndon Johnston	(Canada): Patricia MacNeil; Cory Watson; Michelle Menzies; Kevin Wheeler	(United States): Calla Urbanski; Mark Naylor; Elaine Asanakis; Joel McKeever	
1990	Lethbridge	(Canada): Stacey Ball; Isabelle Brasseur; Jean-Michel Bombardier; Lloyd Eisler	(Canada): Christine Hough; Doug Ladret; Michelle Menzies; Kevin Wheeler	(United States): Elaine Asanakis; Calla Urbanski; Rocky Marval; Joel McKeever	

== Records ==
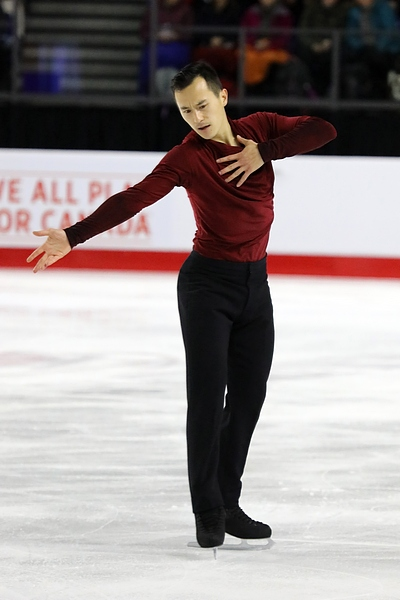
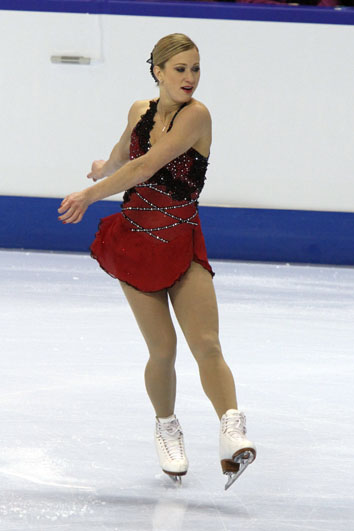
From left to right: Patrick Chan of Canada won six Skate Canada International titles in men's singles, while Michelle Kwan of the United States and Joannie Rochette of Canada each won three titles in women's singles.
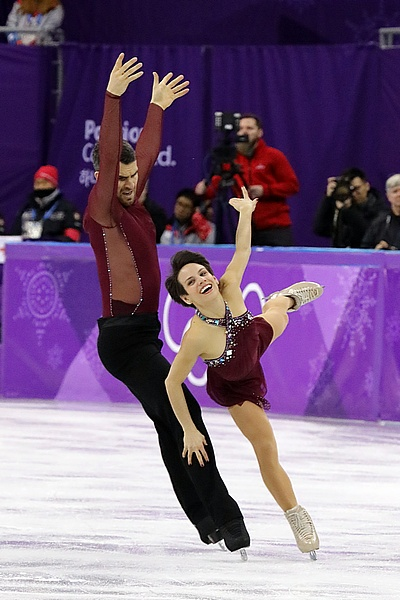
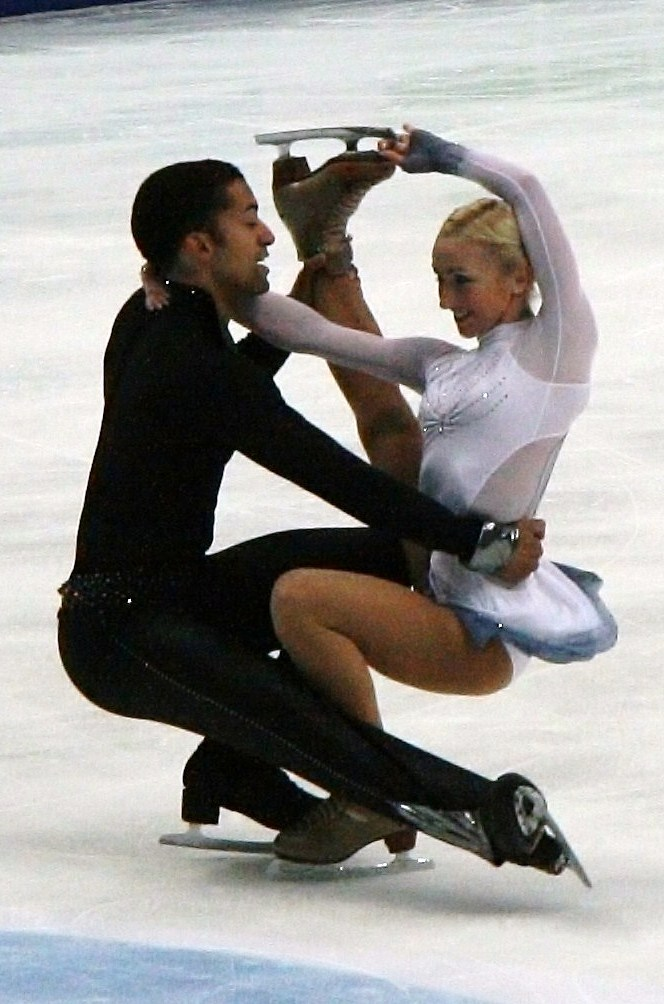
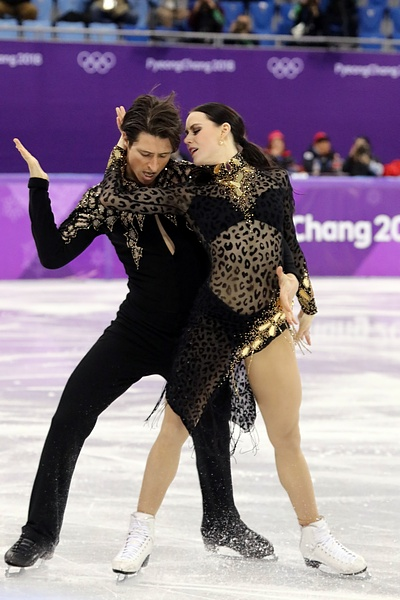
From left to right: Meagan Duhamel and Eric Radford of Canada, and Aljona Savchenko and Robin Szolkowy of Germany, each won four Skate Canada International titles in pair skating; while Tessa Virtue and Scott Moir of Canada won seven titles in ice dance.

Records
Discipline	Most titles			
Discipline	Skater(s)	No.	Years	Ref.
Men's singles	(Canada); Patrick Chan	6	2008; 2010–11; 2013; 2015–16	
Women's singles	(United States); Michelle Kwan	3	1995; 1997; 1999	
Women's singles	(Canada); Joannie Rochette	3	2006; 2008–09	
Pairs	(Canada); Meagan Duhamel; Eric Radford	4	2014–17	
Pairs	(Germany); Aljona Savchenko; Robin Szolkowy	4	2005; 2007; 2009; 2012	
Ice dance	(Canada); Tessa Virtue; Scott Moir	7	2007; 2009; 2011–13; 2016–17	

== Cumulative medal count ==
=== Men's singles ===
Total number of Skate Canada medals in men's singles by nation
Rank	Nation	Gold	Silver	Bronze	Total
1	Canada	23	15	5	43
2	Japan	8	11	12	31
3	United States	6	12	15	33
4	Russia	6	2	3	11
5	France	2	0	3	5
6	Czechoslovakia	2	0	1	3
7	Soviet Union	1	2	1	4
8	Spain	1	2	0	3
9	Great Britain	1	1	1	3
10	Germany	1	0	2	3
11	Switzerland	1	0	0	1
12	Poland	0	3	2	5
13	Israel	0	2	0	2
14	Estonia	0	1	1	2
15	Belgium	0	1	0	1
16	Italy	0	0	2	2
16	South Korea	0	0	2	2
18	Denmark	0	0	1	1
18	Hungary	0	0	1	1
Totals (19 entries)		52	52	52	156

=== Women's singles ===
Total number of Skate Canada medals in women's singles by nation
Rank	Nation	Gold	Silver	Bronze	Total
1	United States	16	11	11	38
2	Canada	12	8	8	28
3	Russia	10	8	4	22
4	Japan	7	14	10	31
5	East Germany	1	2	0	3
6	France	1	1	1	3
7	Soviet Union	1	0	3	4
8	Hungary	1	0	1	2
9	China	1	0	0	1
9	Italy	1	0	0	1
9	Ukraine	1	0	0	1
12	Finland	0	1	3	4
12	Great Britain	0	1	3	4
12	South Korea	0	1	3	4
12	West Germany	0	1	3	4
16	Austria	0	1	1	2
17	Belgium	0	1	0	1
17	Estonia	0	1	0	1
17	Germany	0	1	0	1
20	Switzerland	0	0	1	1
Totals (20 entries)		52	52	52	156

=== Pairs ===
Total number of Skate Canada medals in pair skating by nation
Rank	Nation	Gold	Silver	Bronze	Total
1	Canada	16	9	19	44
2	Russia	10	9	4	23
3	Germany	6	2	0	8
4	China	4	8	0	12
5	Soviet Union	3	4	2	9
6	France	1	0	3	4
6	Italy	1	0	3	4
8	Japan	1	0	0	1
9	United States	0	4	6	10
10	Czech Republic	0	1	0	1
10	East Germany	0	1	0	1
10	Hungary	0	1	0	1
10	Kazakhstan	0	1	0	1
10	Latvia	0	1	0	1
10	Uzbekistan	0	1	0	1
16	Australia	0	0	2	2
16	Poland	0	0	2	2
18	Switzerland	0	0	1	1
Totals (18 entries)		42	42	42	126

=== Ice dance ===
Total number of Skate Canada medals in ice dance by nation
Rank	Nation	Gold	Silver	Bronze	Total
1	Canada	27	14	15	56
2	United States	7	7	7	21
3	Soviet Union	6	3	5	14
4	Great Britain	3	7	2	12
5	France	2	5	5	12
6	Italy	1	3	5	9
7	Lithuania	1	3	1	5
8	Russia	1	2	4	7
9	Ukraine	1	2	1	4
10	Bulgaria	1	1	0	2
11	Finland	1	0	0	1
11	Hungary	1	0	0	1
13	Israel	0	2	1	3
14	Austria	0	1	1	2
15	Belarus	0	1	0	1
15	West Germany	0	1	0	1
17	Czech Republic	0	0	2	2
17	Poland	0	0	2	2
19	Spain	0	0	1	1
Totals (19 entries)		52	52	52	156

=== Total medals ===
This table includes the interpretive program and four skating events held between 1989 and 1994.

Total number of Skate Canada medals by nation
Rank	Nation	Gold	Silver	Bronze	Total
1	Canada	82	50	50	182
2	United States	30	36	43	109
3	Russia	28	21	15	64
4	Japan	17	26	22	65
5	Soviet Union	11	9	11	31
6	Germany	9	3	2	14
7	France	6	6	12	24
8	China	5	8	0	13
9	Great Britain	4	9	6	19
10	Italy	3	3	10	16
11	Ukraine	2	2	1	5
12	Hungary	2	1	2	5
13	Czechoslovakia	2	0	1	3
14	West Germany	1	3	3	7
15	Lithuania	1	3	1	5
16	East Germany	1	3	0	4
17	Spain	1	2	1	4
18	Chinese Taipei	1	2	0	3
19	Finland	1	1	3	5
20	Bulgaria	1	1	0	2
21	Switzerland	1	0	2	3
22	Israel	0	4	1	5
23	Poland	0	3	6	9
24	Denmark	0	2	3	5
25	Austria	0	2	2	4
26	Estonia	0	2	1	3
27	Belgium	0	2	0	2
28	South Korea	0	1	5	6
29	Czech Republic	0	1	2	3
30	Belarus	0	1	0	1
30	Kazakhstan	0	1	0	1
30	Latvia	0	1	0	1
30	Uzbekistan	0	1	0	1
34	Australia	0	0	3	3
Totals (34 entries)		209	210	208	627

== Works cited ==
- Hines, James R. (2006). Figure Skating: A History. University of Illinois Press. ISBN 978-0-252-07286-4.
