= Tara Lipinski =

American sports commentator (born 1982)

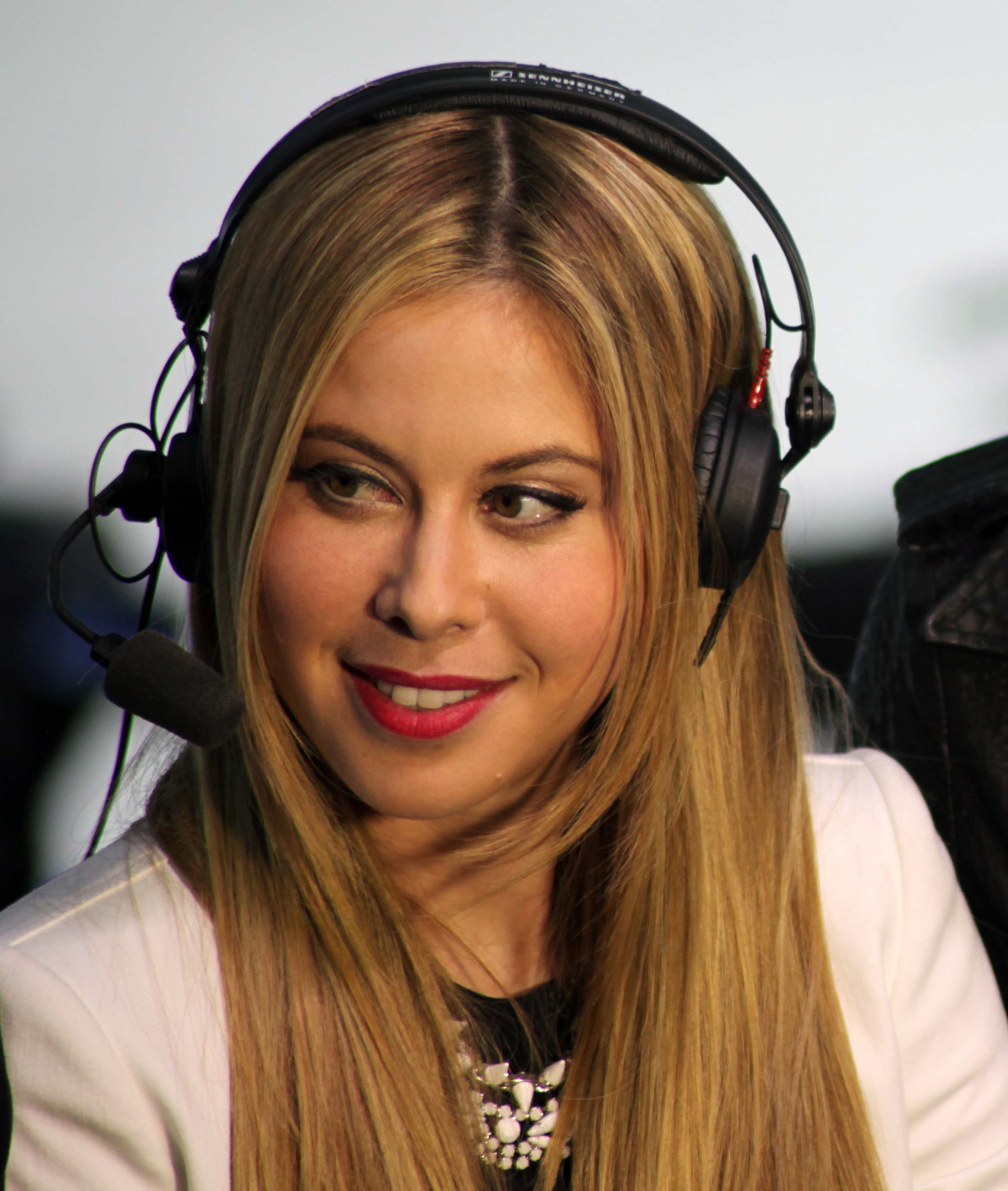
- Lipinski at the 2014 Winter Olympics in Sochi
- Born: Tara Kristen Lipinski; June 10, 1982 (age 44); Philadelphia, Pennsylvania, U.S.
- Occupations: Figure skater; sports commentator
- Height: 5 ft 1 in (1.55 m)
- Spouse: Todd Kapostasy (m. 2017)
- Children: 1
- Figure skating career
- Country: United States
- Discipline: Women's singles
- Began skating: 1988
- Competitive: 1993–1998
- Professional: 1998–2002
- Retired: 2002

Medal record
Olympic Games
Gold medal – first place	1998 Nagano	Singles
World Championships
Gold medal – first place	1997 Lausanne	Singles
Grand Prix Final
Gold medal – first place	1996–1997 Hamilton	Singles
Gold medal – first place	1997–1998 Munich	Singles
U.S. Championships
Gold medal – first place	1997 Nashville	Singles
Silver medal – second place	1998 Philadelphia	Singles
Bronze medal – third place	1996 San Jose	Singles

Tara Kristen Lipinski (born June 10, 1982) is an American sports commentator and former competitive figure skater. A former competitor in women's singles, she was the 1997 U.S. national champion and world champion, a two-time Champions Series Final champion (1997–1998), and the 1998 Olympic champion. She is the youngest single skater Olympic champion and World champion ever, and until 2019 was the youngest to win the U.S. Nationals. She was the first woman to complete a triple loop–triple loop combination, which became her signature jump element, in competition.

Lipinski retired from competitive figure skating in 1998. She performed in live shows before retiring from figure skating in 2002. In 2014, Lipinski became one of NBC's primary figure skating commentators, alongside sports commentator Terry Gannon and fellow figure skater and good friend Johnny Weir.

== Early life ==
Lipinski was born on June 10, 1982, in Philadelphia. Her mother is "Pat" Lipinski, and her father is Jack Lipinski, an oil executive. They are of Polish Catholic ancestry. She spent her earliest years living in the suburb Sewell, New Jersey. When Lipinski was two, while watching the 1984 Summer Olympics, she stood on a Tupperware bowl and pretended to be a gold medalist. At the age of three she began roller skating, and became a national champion in her group when she was nine years old. She began figure skating in the same year, transferring her skills to the ice rink. She later switched exclusively to figure skating and took lessons at the University of Delaware. She worked on and off with coach Jeff DiGregorio for three years

In 1991, Lipinski's father received a job promotion, so the family moved to Sugar Land, Texas, near Houston. She trained on a public rink at The Galleria. Two years later, Lipinski and her mother returned to Delaware to resume her training with DiGregorio; her father stayed in Texas to support their family. In 1995, Lipinski and her mother moved to Bloomfield Hills, Michigan, to train with coach Richard Callaghan at the Detroit Skating Club.

== Competitive career ==
=== Early years ===
In 1994, Lipinski earned a silver medal in the novice women's division at the 1994 U.S. Figure Skating Championships. When she was 12, she became the youngest athlete to win a gold medal at the 1994 U.S. Olympic Festival. She then took first place in November in the Blue Swords in Chemnitz, Germany, her first international competition, after which the media began to notice her. As a junior skater, she came in fourth place at the 1995 World Junior Championships and came in second place at the 1995 U.S. Championships. In late 1995, she placed fifth at the 1996 World Junior Championships, which marked the end of the relationship between DiGregorio and the Lipinskis.

Lipinski and her mother interviewed prospective coaches, then hired Richard Callaghan. In January 1996, Lipinski won a bronze medal as a senior-level skater at the 1996 U.S. Championships. Despite low expectations, she closed out the 1995–96 season and gained international attention by qualifying for the 1996 World Championships. Placed 23rd after the short program, she performed seven triple jumps in her free skate and finished 15th.

=== 1996–97 season ===
Lipinski and Callaghan spent the next year making her appear more mature; she enrolled in ballet classes and hired choreographer Sandra Bezic to "create programs for Lipinski that expressed delight yet looked adult". In late 1996, she added the triple loop-triple loop jump combination, which added technical difficulty to her programs. She was the first woman to complete the jump combination in competition. Lipinski competed in the ISU Champions Series (later renamed the ISU Grand Prix of Figure Skating) during the 1996–97 season; she finished in second place at Skate Canada, third at Trophée Lalique, and second at the 1996 Nations Cup. She won the gold medal at the Champion Series Final and defeated Michelle Kwan by completing more jumps in her short and free programs.

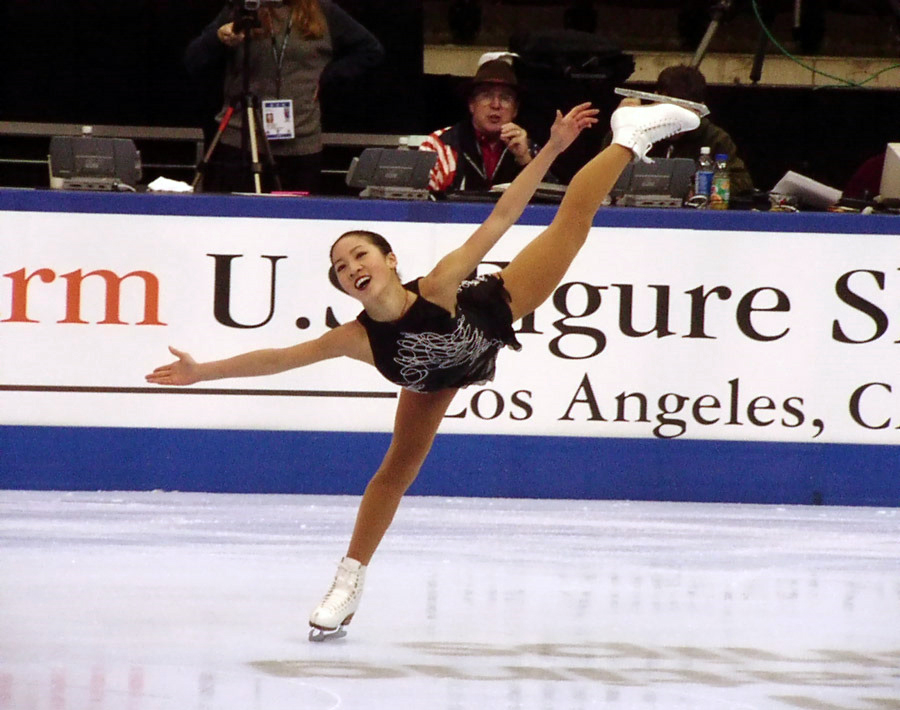
Lipinski's rival Michelle Kwan

In February 1997, at the age of 14, Lipinski became the youngest skater to win a U.S. Championships title. She broke the record set by Sonya Klopfer, who was 15 when she won the U.S. Nationals in 1951. (Note: Lipinski's record was broken by Alysa Liu, who won the 2019 U.S. Nationals at the age of 13.) She defeated Kwan, the reigning 1996 U.S. champion, who won the short program. Kwan fell twice and landed only four out of her seven planned triple jumps in her free skate, leaving the door open for Lipinski's victory. She was the last skater to perform in the competition's free skating segment; she skated cleanly with seven triple jumps, including her signature jump element, the triple loop-triple loop combination, and came in first place. According to author Ed Swift from Sports Illustrated, the 1997 U.S. Nationals marked the start of the Kwan–Lipinski rivalry.

A month later, Lipinski won the 1997 World Championships, becoming the youngest female skater to win that event. She was a month younger than the previous record holder, Sonja Henie from Norway, when she won the first of her ten World Championships in 1927. (Note: Despite the ISU's recent decision to raise the age minimum to enter international competitions, Lipinski was eligible to compete at Worlds due to a grandfather clause.) Lipinski completed seven triple jumps, as she had done at the U.S. Nationals and the Champion Series Final, and finished in first place after the short program. She also completed two double Axels, but one rival coach noted the small height of her jumps, stating that "you couldn't have put a piece of paper under them". Her presentation marks were mostly 5.7s or 5.8s (Note: Up to 2004, the 6.0 system was used to judge all international figure skating competitions. Judges awarded two marks: one for technical merit and one for presentation, and marks ranged from 0.0 to 6.0.) and similar to her technical marks. Three out of four judges gave her higher presentation than technical marks.

Reporter Jere Longman of The New York Times called Lipinski's free skate "a light, airy performance" and said she was "composed and nearly flawless". Lipinski opened with a double Axel and landed a triple flip jump as well as her triple loop-triple loop combination, among others. She received 5.8s and 5.9s in her technical marks and a 5.7 and 5.8 for presentation. The final results after the free skate were close, and the judges were unable to declare a clear winner of the free skate. Lipinski, Kwan—who was fourth after the short program—and Russian skater Irina Slutskaya all received first-place votes. Kwan's free skate came in first place because she had more first- and second-place votes, and Lipinski came in first place overall because she received more second-place votes in the free skate than Slutskaya. If two more judges had placed Slutskaya before Lipinski after the free skate, Kwan would have won the competition instead of coming in second place. It was the first time the U.S. had finished first and second at Worlds since 1992, when Kristi Yamaguchi won the gold medal and Nancy Kerrigan silver.

=== 1997–98 season ===
==== Pre-Olympic season ====
Between seasons, Lipinski grew two inches and turned 15 years old. She went into the 1997–98 season by continuing to add more sophistication to her programs by taking daily dance classes from Russian ballet teacher Marina Sheffer. She selected film scores for both her short and free skate programs, with the choreographies being created by Sandra Bezic. According to figure skating writer and historian Ellyn Kestnbaum, the American press played up "the Kwan–Lipinski rivalry for all it was worth".

At the 1997 Skate America, Kwan defeated Lipinski for the first time in three competitions and won the gold medal. Lipinski came in second place after Kwan in both the short program and free skate, taking second place overall. Despite performing more difficult jumps than Kwan during her short program, Lipinski consistently received lower technical marks. During her free skate, she fell on a triple Lutz jump, but performed an otherwise technically difficult and strong program. According to Kestnbaum, Callaghan "expressed bewilderment in why the judges had so marked down the reigning World champion, who by virtue of that position might otherwise have been expected to receive the benefit of any doubt". Lipinski came in second place at Trophée Lalique, behind French skater Laetitia Hubert, who had not won any major competitions since the 1992 World Junior Championships and who came in eleventh place at her previous competition.

Coming into the 1997–98 Champions Series Final, Lipinski was tied for fourth place in the Series standings with Russia's Maria Butyrskaya. She won the competition, skating her first clean program of the season. Kwan, although she was eligible, withdrew from the Finals due to injuries. Mike Penner from the Los Angeles Times reported that both Lipinski and Callaghan were concerned about what they considered unfair treatment by the judges at the Champion Series that season, who gave Lipinski lower technical marks than the previous season, as low as 5.3, for an incorrectly performed Lutz. According to Penner, the judges told Callaghan that Lipinski regularly performed her Lutz jumps from the inside edge of her blade instead of from the correct outside edge, something skaters used to call a "flutz". (Note: See Kestnbaum, p. 159, for a more detailed explanation of Lipinski's execution of the Lutz.) Lipinski and Callaghan disputed the judges' marks for her jumps, stating that she had performed them the same way the previous season, when she won both the Worlds and U.S. Nationals. Lipinski's lower marks were subject of several articles in major U.S. newspapers. According to reporter Nancy Armour of The Associated Press, Lipinski showed her best performance of the season at the Finals with a well-executed triple Lutz.

At the 1998 U.S. Championships, Lipinski came in second behind Kwan. In her short program, Lipinski fell on a triple flip attempt, which she called "the lowest point" of her career. She recovered enough from her short program to climb from fourth place to second overall. She would have had to win the free skate and Kwan to come in third place or lower for Lipinski to win the championship. Lipinski performed her free skate program with seven triple jumps, including her trademark triple loop-triple loop and a difficult triple toe loop-half loop-triple Salchow combination. The judges awarded her all 5.8s and 5.9s, except for a pair of 5.7s for presentation. (Note: In 2018, the name of the half loop jump was changed to "Euler" by the International Skating Union.)

==== 1998 Winter Olympics ====
U.S. Figure Skating selected Kwan, Lipinski, and Nicole Bobek, who came in third place at Nationals, to send to the 1998 Winter Olympics in Nagano, Japan. Lipinski and Kwan entered the Olympics as co-favorites to win the gold medal.

In the women's individual event, Kwan won the short program with eight of the nine judges putting her in first place. Lipinski came in second place. Swift called Lipinski's short program performance, which was technically more difficult than Kwan's, "luminous–fast and light and joyful". Her free skate, featuring her signature triple loop-triple loop combination and seven triple jumps total, was technically the most difficult program in Olympic history up to then. She received 5.8s and 5.9s in presentation marks. Kwan received all 5.9s in presentation but lower technical marks than Lipinski. Kwan performed her free skate almost perfectly, with one minor error during one of her jumps. According to Washington Post reporter Amy Shipley, Kwan "skated brilliantly and Lipinski skated better". Swift noted that Kwan's performance of her free skate "would have been enough to win at any other Olympics", but the judges, by awarding her five 5.7s in her technical marks, left room for Lipinski to move ahead. Swift added that Lipinski "had a blast" skating her free skate program and "soared and spun with abandon, filling the [rink] with her joy". Like Kwan, she completed seven triple jumps, but "the difference was her trademark triple loop-triple loop combination and a wonderful closing triple toe-half loop-triple Salchow [combination]". According to Kestnbaum, Lipinski's jumps were not as big as Kwan's and her jump take-offs were not ideal, but her landings were clean and increased in speed as she came out of them. Her spins were faster than Kwan's but not as difficult, and their positions were weaker. Kestnbaum also stated: "Nor did [Lipinski's] program demonstrate transitional steps as complex, stroking quality as nuanced, or body carriage and line as controlled and elegant". Lipinski was awarded 5.8s and 5.9s for her technical and presentation marks, and earned six out of nine first-place marks from the judges, winning the gold medal because the free skate was weighted more heavily than the short program.

Lipinski was the youngest Olympic gold medalist in figure skating history, and the sixth American woman to win an Olympic gold medal in figure skating. Kwan finished in second place, and Chinese skater Lu Chen was the surprise bronze medal winner. Lipinski was two months younger than Sonja Henie when she came in first place at the 1928 Winter Olympics, breaking a record that had stood for 70 years. Single skaters from the same country had not won gold and silver medals at the Olympics since Americans Tenley Albright and Carol Heiss in 1956.

== Professional career ==
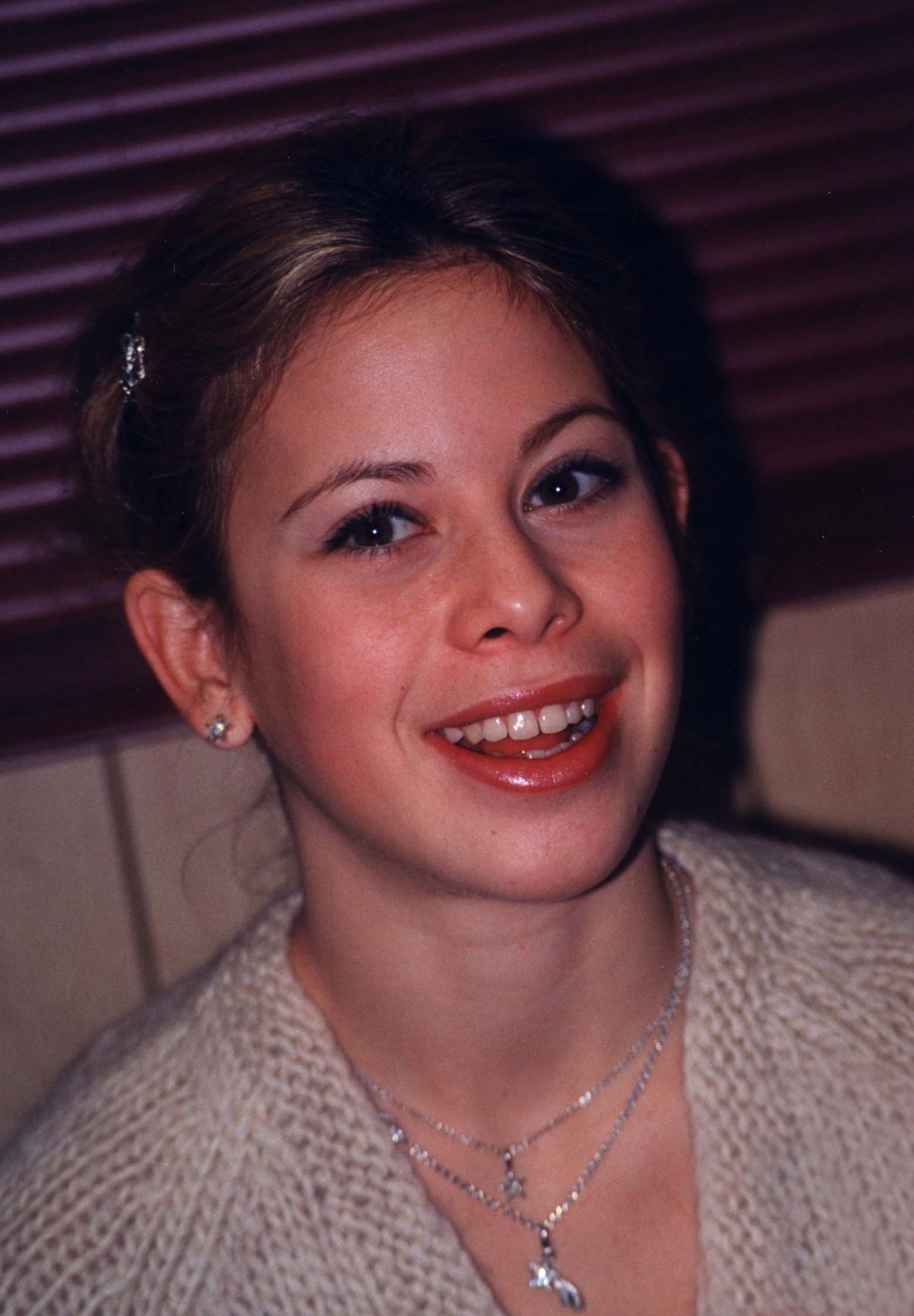
Lipinski in December 1998

In March 1998, Lipinski announced her decision to withdraw from the 1998 World Championships, citing a serious glandular infection that required her to have two molars extracted, constant fatigue, and possible mononucleosis. In April, Lipinski announced her intention to turn professional in an interview on the NBC program Today Show, thus ending her eligibility to compete at the Olympics again (at the time professional skaters could not compete, this wasn't relaxed until 2006). As her main motivations, she mentioned the desire to end her family's separation caused by her skating career and to focus on other goals such as attending college in another two years. According to The New York Times, her decision "sent tremors through the Olympic figure skating community". USA Today criticized her decision, stating that she had taken the easy way out, and compared it to joining the circus. Figure skater Scott Hamilton noted in his book Landing It: My Life On and Off the Ice that Lipinski took "an enormous amount of heat" for turning professional.

In 1998, due to many endorsements and book deals, Lipinski's net worth was estimated at $12 million. She signed an exclusive deal with CBS to do some acting and to perform in ice shows and non-sanctioned competitions. After the Olympics, Lipinski toured with Champions on Ice, visiting 90 cities in the U.S. In August 1998, she ended her association with Champions on Ice, with which she had performed since 1995, and joined the cast of Stars on Ice in order to improve artistically and participate in the show's group numbers. She suffered from sore hips and an injured hip during rehearsals. In the same year, Lipinski wrote two books, Totally Tara – An Olympic Journey and Tara Lipinski: Triumph on Ice.

In 1999, Lipinski performed with Stars on Ice for a second season and participated in the ISU-sanctioned Grand Slam of Figure Skating. She became a spokeswoman for Boys and Girls Clubs of America and an anti-drug advocate, appeared on the soap opera The Young and the Restless. She acted in television shows for the Fox Family Network and Nickelodeon. She also became the youngest skater to win the World Professional Figure Skating Championships, completing a triple flip, a triple toe loop, and a triple Salchow jump in her free skate program. Her marks consisted of two 10s, eleven 9.9s, and one 9.8; she won by more than one point over Denise Biellmann, who came in second place.

Lipinski had hip surgery in 2000 at the age of 18, which she believed saved her career. Her injury, a torn labrum in her hip, had been misdiagnosed for four or five years and had caused her a great deal of joint pain. She became a spokesperson to increase awareness about deep vein thrombosis (DVT), which the National Institutes of Health called "a dangerous potential side effect of surgery". The injury, which might have occurred before the 1998 Winter Olympics, became progressively worse until she was unable to tour. The surgery, which usually lasts 45 minutes, took 3.5 hours to complete because she was developing arthritis, and cartilage had grown over the bone. She was back on the ice seven days later for light practice with Stars on Ice. She was able to return to touring but had to withdraw from the 2000 World Professional Championships. In 2002, Lipinski toured 61 U.S. cities with Stars on Ice, then retired from skating.

== Skating technique ==
Lipinski's skating influencers were Kristi Yamaguchi, Scott Hamilton, and Christopher Bowman. Her skating style was often contrasted to that of Michelle Kwan: Jere Longman called Lipinski "the consistent Energizer bunny of a jumper" and Kwan "the more sophisticated, complete artist". Kwan's coach Frank Carroll called Lipinski's style "wonderful", adding that she was "turning easy, jumping easy". Writer Ellyn Kestnbaum remarked that compared to Kwan's "more carefully choreographed expressions of joy", Lipinski displayed "unselfconsious and spontaneous joy in her own movement that projected a greater air of confidence and command of the space".

Kestnbaum discusses Lipinski's skating technique in her book Culture on Ice: Figure Skating and Cultural Meaning to illustrate women's and girls' influence on figure skating. She states that "cynics and purists who valued the artistic possibilities of the sport or the fine points of skating technique complained that the judges who awarded Lipinski her gold medals were just counting the jumps and not paying attention to the quality of those jumps, much less to the quality of the rest of her skating". Kestnbaum uses Lipinski as an example of how teenagers, especially teenage girls, dominated the sport, and how many people in the press criticized the development, some even Lipinski herself for encouraging it. Her jumps, which Kestnbaum calls "small and in some cases technically flawed", were debated in the press in 1997 and 1998. She notes that Lipinski's early programs, choreographed by Sandra Bezik, emphasized her youth and femininity, while by the 1998 Olympics, the focus was on "greater polish or 'maturity' in her presentation skills".

In Longman's opinion, Lipinski "has propelled the sport forward with the difficulty of her jumps". Ed Swift remarked that although Lipinski's jumps were not big, her spins were "so fast that she seems to dematerialize, like Tinkerbell, in the midst of her jumps". In March 1997, he stated that Lipinski had "musicality and poise that are far beyond her years", and although he admitted that she often suffered from nerves, she was "the complete skating package, if a diminutive one, and a pleasure to watch". In 2018, U.S. Figure Skating president Sam Auxier credited Lipinski for increasing the level of complexity of Olympic skating.

== Broadcasting career ==
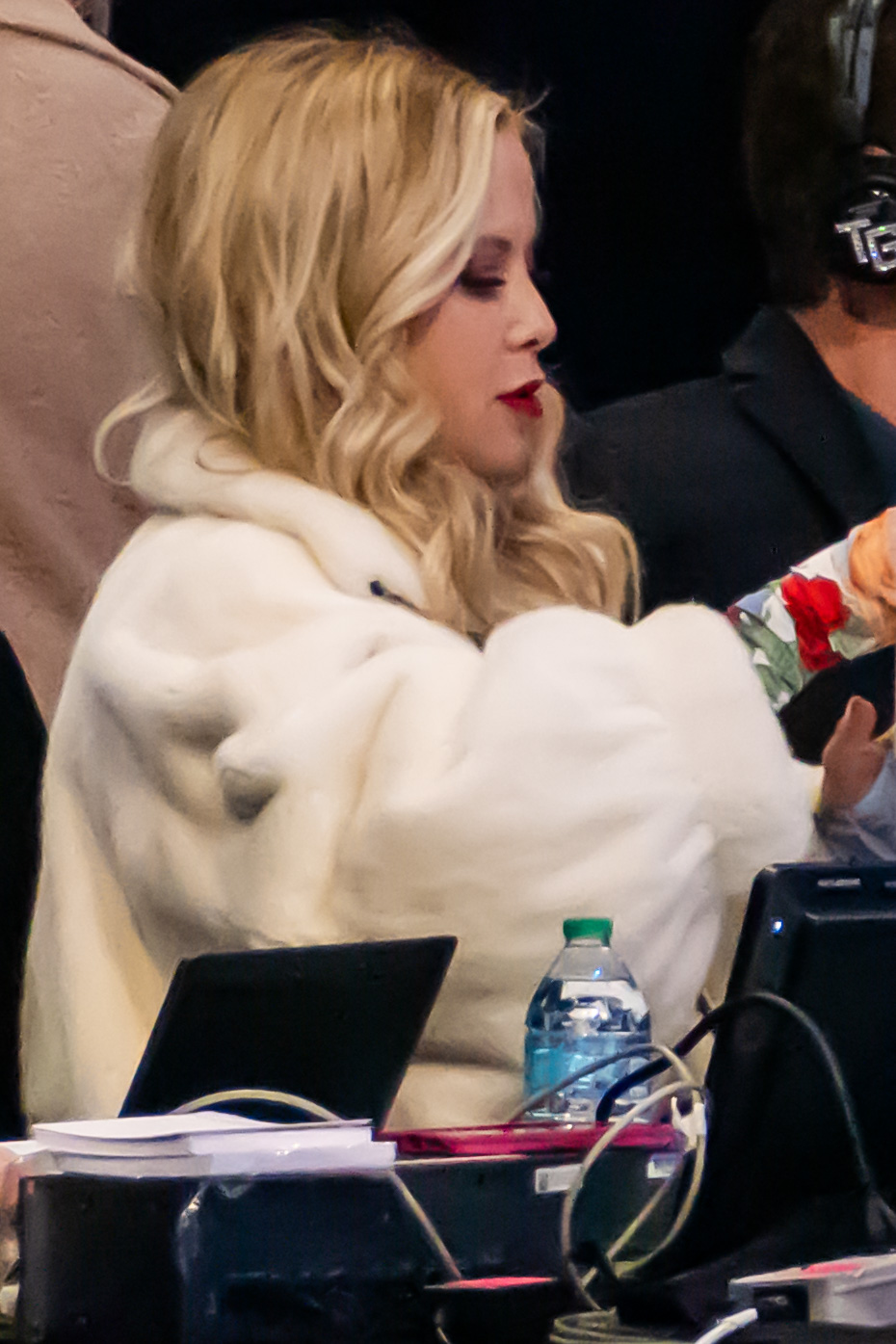
Lipinski working as a commentator at the 2025 World Championships

Lipinski spent a few years traveling and working "here and there" after her retirement from figure skating. She did some acting, but decided that it "just wasn't my thing". In 2009, longing for the high she had felt as a figure skater, (Note: Lipinski told reporter Jennifer Calfas in 2018 that she got the "same adrenaline rush" from live TV broadcasts that she got as a competitive skater.) she contacted U.S. Figure Skating's streaming service Ice Network and offered to work as a commentator for competitions. She began commentating for Universal Sports in 2010 and started working for NBC and NBC Sports in 2011, where she commentated most international figure skating competition broadcasts. Unlike what was customary for skating commentators when she competed, she would call figure skating from studios in the U.S. instead of live at the competition venue. She also became a special correspondent for Extra and local NBC affiliates.

Lipinski teamed with sports commentator Terry Gannon and fellow figure skater and good friend Johnny Weir at the 2014 Winter Olympics in Sochi as the network's second team of figure skating commentators for their daily live broadcasts. At first Lipinski collaborated with Gannon at the women's events and Weir with Gannon at the men's events. After realizing that they worked well together, with what Lipinski called their "instant chemistry", they pitched the idea of the three commentating together for NBC; Lipinski stated that it "was sort of meant to be". The trio generated the 10 best weekday daytime audiences in NBC's history. According to reporter Tom Weir, "they had instant comedic harmony, with their casual chatter and humorous asides playing amazingly well against the staunch and exacting backdrop of figure skating". Following the Olympics, the trio was promoted to be NBC's primary figure skating commentators. Lipinski, along with Weir and Gannon, was an analyst at the 2018 Winter Olympics. Commentating during prime time at the Olympics had been a dream of Lipinski's. The trio also hosted the closing ceremonies of the 2018, 2020, 2022, and 2024 Olympic Games. They were part of the broadcast team that won a Sports Emmy Award for its coverage of the 2024 Games.

NBC's Access Hollywood hired Lipinski and Weir in 2014 to analyze fashion on the red carpet at the 86th Academy Awards. She served as a social media, lifestyle, and fashion correspondent for NBC Sports, including the Beverly Hills Dog Show with Weir in 2017, the National Dog Show since 2015, the Kentucky Derby from 2014 to 2018, and the pre-game coverage for the Super Bowl in 2015 and 2017. They were called culture correspondents by People magazine for the 2016 Summer Olympics.

According to the Houston Chronicle, Lipinski approached broadcasting "with passion, vigor and an arduous work ethic similar to what she brought to the ice". She spent hundreds of hours researching skaters. Her broadcasting influences were Peggy Fleming, Dick Button, and Scott Hamilton; she listened to tapes of Hamilton's past broadcasts to learn how to commentate. She called her broadcasting career her "second dream". In 2018, she told Entertainment Tonight, "I feel extremely grateful that Johnny and I have found this spot in our world, and it gives us opportunities outside of skating". The same year, The Washington Post reported that viewers' response to Lipinski and Weir were mixed; some considered them "Olympic darlings–a one-stop shop for knowledge, sass and brass", while others found them "mean, obnoxious, and distracting". Scott Hamilton, who was replaced at NBC by Lipinski, Weir, and Gannon, called them a "phenomenon" and "such a breath of fresh air". GQ called their commentating style "a Gladwell-ian ability to demystify figure skating for the uninitiated and an extreme candor for which they've caught some heat".

Cosmopolitan considered Lipinski and Weir's commentating style honest and colorful, and noted that they used banter and avoided what the magazine called "fluffy, polished performances". They tried to present figure skating in an accessible way to their viewers, keeping the more technical aspects of the sport to a minimum but emphasizing its "gossipy nuances". Sports writer and media critic Bill Goodykoontz named their enthusiasm for figure skating their "calling card". In Dick Button's opinion, Lipinski and Weir were "excellent", but that Lipinski "might talk a little too much", although Tom Weir stated that when skaters were "elegant and error-free", both Lipinski and Weir had "the good sense to stay silent". Goodykoontz pointed out that Lipinski and Weir were uncharacteristically quiet during the short program of Russia's Kamila Valieva, representing the Russian Olympic Committee, who was allowed to compete despite failing a drug test prior to the 2022 Winter Olympics. They chose to simply announce Valieva's jumps and express their opinions that she should not have been allowed to compete afterwards instead. Their style was applauded and called powerful, but "others thought they were being too harsh on Valieva, citing her age".

In 2016, Lipinsky and Weir produced a podcast on Stitcher, entitled Tara & Johnny. In 2018 and 2019, Lipinski and Weir hosted and appeared in a few shows on Food Network, including two seasons of Wedding Cake Challenge. In 2022, Lipinski co-hosted Wedding Talk with event planner José Rolón and wedding designer Jove Meyer, produced by Chicken Soup for the Soul Studios. In the same year, Lipinski and her husband, Todd Kapostasy, a sports producer and documentary director, co-produced Meddling: The Olympic Skating Scandal That Shocked the World, a four-part documentary series focusing on the skating controversy at the 2002 Winter Olympics, which was aired on the NBC streaming service Peacock in January 2022. Lipinski, who called the series "a deep and responsible look at what happened", said that she and Kapostasy chose to create the series because it was the 20th anniversary of the scandal and there had been no comprehensive look at what happened. They interviewed people in Russia, France, and Canada who were involved in the scandal. USA Today calls the documentary "a deep look into the scandal".

== Personal life ==
Lipinski expressed her Catholic faith with a devotion to St. Therese of Lisieux since 1994, and credited St. Therese for her Olympic win in 1998 and the recovery from her hip surgery in 2000. During the Olympics, she wore a medal of St. Therese. She thanked St. Therese at the kiss and cry after her short program in Nagano, and her coach held a small statue of St. Therese during her free skate. She also wore a necklace with a good-luck charm, given to her by her uncle, with the words, "Short, but good". Lipinski would also place a statue of St. Therese on the boards before every competition. In 2001, Lipinski established a playroom in St. Therese's honor in the children's ward in a Detroit hospital. She said that roses, a symbol of St. Therese, had "always appeared at her best and worst moments".

Lipinski married sports producer Todd Kapostasy in June 2017. They met at the 2015 Sports Emmys, where she presented his award, and dated the following two years. Johnny Weir was a bridesman and Scott Hamilton was among the invited guests. She has detailed her struggles with infertility, which she called "the fertility journey from hell", in her 2023 podcast, Tara Lipinski: Unexpecting. She told People magazine in August 2023 that during the previous five years, she had four miscarriages, four D&Cs, six failed IVF transfers, eight egg retrievals, was diagnosed with endometriosis, and had two major surgeries. In October 2023, the couple welcomed their first child, a daughter, via surrogacy.

In September 2020, in order to help raise awareness of the condition, Lipinski made public her diagnosis of endometriosis after having laparoscopic surgery to treat it. Although her symptoms were not severe, the intermittent pain she experienced worsened over five years before it was diagnosed and treated. She reported that her surgery was successful, all of her adhesions were removed, and her recovery was "mainly pain free". She credited dancer and actress Julianne Hough and actress Gabrielle Union with increasing awareness of endometriosis, which encouraged Lipinski to seek out her own treatment.

== Records and achievements ==
- Youngest athlete (12 years old) to win a gold medal at the U.S. Olympic Festival (1994)
- First woman to complete a triple loop-triple loop combination, her signature jump element, in competition (1996)
- Youngest woman (14 years old) to win the World Figure Skating Championships (1997)
- Sixth American woman to win an Olympic gold medal in figure skating (1998)
- Youngest skater (16 years old) to win the World Professional Figure Skating Championships (1999)
- Youngest inductee into the United States Figure Skating Hall of Fame (2013)

== Figure skating ==
=== Programs ===
- Program details mentioned at first occurrence
- Olympic seasons highlighted in blue
- Programs performed at the Winter Olympics highlighted in **bold**

Competition and exhibition programs by season
Season	Short program	Free skate program	Exhibition program
1994–95	Cirque du Soleil	Samson and Delilah: Composed by Camille Saint-Saëns	—N/a
1995–96	On the Town: Composed by Leonard Bernstein	Medley: 1. Speed; Composed by Mark Mancina; 2. The Prince of Tides; Composed by James Newton Howard	On the Town
1995–96	On the Town: Composed by Leonard Bernstein	Medley: 1. Speed; Composed by Mark Mancina; 2. The Prince of Tides; Composed by James Newton Howard	Medley: 1. Speed; 2. The Prince of Tides
1996–97	Little Women: Composed by Thomas Newman; Choreo. by Sandra Bezic	Much Ado About Nothing: Composed by Patrick Doyle	"Walking on Sunshine": Performed by Katrina and the Waves
1997–98	**Anastasia**: Composed by David Newman; Performed by Liz Callaway; Choreo. by Sandra Bezic; **Tracks used**: 1. "Once Upon a December"; 2. "Journey to the Past"	Medley: 1. "Prelude and Opening"; From The Rainbow; Composed by Carl Davis; 2. "Scenes of Summer: Festival"; Composed by Lee Holdridge; Performed by the London Symphony Orchestra; Choreo. by Sandra Bezic	**Anastasia** ("Journey to the Past")

=== Competitive highlights ===
- GP – Event of the ISU Champions Series
- WD – Withdrew from event

Competition placements at senior level
Season	1995–96	1996–97	1997–98
Winter Olympics			1st
World Championships	15th	1st	WD
GP Final		1st	1st
GP Nations Cup		2nd	
GP Skate America			2nd
GP Skate Canada		2nd	
GP Trophée Lalique		3rd	2nd
Nebelhorn Trophy	4th		
U.S. Championships	3rd	1st	2nd

- J – junior level, N – novice level

Competition placements at junior and novice level
Season	1993–94	1994–95	1995–96
World Junior Championships		4th	5th
Nebelhorn Trophy			4th
U.S. Championships	2nd N	2nd J	

=== Professional ===
- 1998 Skate TV Championships: 1st
- 1998 Ice Wars: 1st (Team USA)
- 1998 Jefferson Pilot Financial Championships: 1st
- 1999 Team Ice Wars: 2nd (Team USA)
- 1999 Ice Wars: 1st (Team USA)
- 1999 Grand Slam Super Teams of Skating: 1st
- 1999 World Professional Championship: 1st
- 2001 World Ice Challenge: 1st (Team USA)
- 2002 Ice Wars: 1st (Team USA)

== Television credits ==
- Early Edition (1997), Herself
- Touched by an Angel (1999), Alex Thorpe
- Sabrina, the Teenage Witch (1999), Herself
- The Young and the Restless (1999), Marnie Kowalski
- Ice Angel (2000), Tracy Hannibal
- Are You Afraid of the Dark? (2000), Ellen
- Vanilla Sky (2001), Girl at Party – Uncredited
- Arliss (2002), Herself
- 7th Heaven (2003), Christine
- The Metro Chase (2004), Natalie Jordon
- Still Standing (2005), Sarah
- What's New, Scooby-Doo? (2005), Grey – Voice role
- Malcolm in the Middle (2006), Carrie
- Whose Line Is It Anyway (2014), Herself
- Superstore (2016), Herself
- Kidding (2018), Herself
- Family Guy (2018), Herself – Voice role (Episode: "Griffin Winter Games")
- Amphibia (2019), Herself – Voice role
- Scooby-Doo and Guess Who? (2020), Herself – Voice role
- Wedding Talk (2022), Herself – Host
- Night Court (2023), Herself.
- Extra Mile Club: Scotland (2025), Herself
- The Traitors (2026), Herself
- Big Bargain Holiday Showdown (2026), Herself

== Bibliography ==
- Lipinski, Tara; Costello, Emily (1997). Tara Lipinski: Triumph on Ice. New York: Bantam Dell. ISBN 978-0553097757.
- Lipinski, Tara; Zeigler, Mark (1998). Totally Tara: Tara Lipinski – An Olympic Journey. New York: Universe Publishing. ISBN 978-0789301420.

== Notes and references ==
=== Works cited ===
- Hamilton, Scott; Benet, Lorenzo (October 1, 2000). Landing It: My Life On and Off the Ice. New York City: Kensington Books. ISBN 978-0786011490.
- Hines, James R. (April 22, 2011). Historical Dictionary of Figure Skating. Lanham, Maryland: Scarecrow Press. ISBN 978-0810868595.
- Kestnbaum, Ellyn (May 21, 2003). Culture on Ice: Figure Skating and Cultural Meaning. Middletown, Connecticut: Wesleyan University Press. ISBN 978-0819566423.
- MedlinePlus (Spring 2011). "Skater Tara Lipinski Speaks Out About DVT" (PDF). MedlinePlus. 6 (1). Bethesda, Maryland: United States National Library of Medicine. Archived from the original on March 6, 2019.
