= Josée Chouinard =

Canadian figure skater (born 1969)

Personal information
- Born: August 21, 1969 (age 56) Montreal, Quebec
- Height: 1.57 m (5 ft 2 in)

Figure skating career
- Country: Canada
- Retired: 1996
Medal record
Representing Canada
Figure skating: Ladies' singles
Grand Prix Final
Bronze medal – third place	1995–96 Paris	Ladies' singles

Josée Chouinard (born August 21, 1969) is a Canadian former competitive figure skater. She is the 1996 Champions Series Final bronze medallist and a three-time Canadian national champion (1991, 1993–1994). She finished in the top ten at two Winter Olympics.

== Personal life ==
Chouinard was born in Montreal, Quebec. In August 1997, she married Canadian pair skater Jean-Michel Bombardier. Their twins, Fiona and Noah, were born in January 2005. She and her husband separated c. 2006.

== Career ==
Chouinard began skating following the 1976 Winter Olympics, which she saw on television.

She won silver at the 1988 Nebelhorn Trophy, gold at the 1989 Karl Schäfer Memorial, and gold at the 1990 Skate Canada International. After taking her first national title, in January 1991, she was assigned to the 1991 World Championships in Munich, Germany. Ranked 8th in the short program and 5th in the free skate, she would finish 6th overall at her first ISU Championship. Subsequently, she won the Canadian figure skating championships in 1993 and 1994.

Chouinard finished as high as 5th at the World Championships (1992 and 1994). She competed at the 1992 and 1994 Winter Olympics, finishing 9th on both occasions.

Chouinard began her coaching career in 1992, in Laval, Quebec. She later coached at the Granite Club in Toronto, Ontario (from 2002 to 2017) and at the Richmond Training Centre in Richmond Hill, Ontario.

== Results ==
GP: Champions Series (Grand Prix)

International
Event	87–88	88–89	89–90	90–91	91–92	92–93	93–94	94–95	95–96
Olympics					9th		9th		
Worlds				6th	5th	9th	5th		
GP Final									3rd
GP France									1st
GP Skate Canada									3rd
Nations Cup					8th		4th		
Nebelhorn Trophy		2nd							
NHK Trophy				4th		9th			
Piruetten							2nd		
Schäfer Memorial			1st						
Skate America		11th			9th				
Skate Canada				1st		3rd			
Skate Electric				2nd					
National
Canadian Champ.	2nd J		3rd	1st	2nd	1st	1st		2nd
J = Junior; WD = Withdrew

Chouinard also won gold at the 2000 Sears Canadian Open.
