= Isabelle Brasseur =

Canadian pair skater (born 1970)

Personal information
- Other names: Isabelle Brasseur-Marval
- Born: July 28, 1970 (age 56) Kingsbury, Quebec
- Home town: Saint-Jean-sur-Richelieu, Quebec, Canada
- Height: 1.52 m (5 ft 0 in)

Figure skating career
- Country: Canada
- Retired: 1994
Medal record
Representing Canada
Figure skating: Pairs
Olympic Games
Bronze medal – third place	1992 Albertville	Pairs
Bronze medal – third place	1994 Lillehammer	Pairs
World Championships
Gold medal – first place	1993 Prague	Pairs
Silver medal – second place	1990 Halifax	Pairs
Silver medal – second place	1991 Munich	Pairs
Silver medal – second place	1994 Chiba	Pairs
Bronze medal – third place	1992 Oakland	Pairs

Isabelle Brasseur, MSM (born July 28, 1970) is a Canadian former competitive pair skater. With her partner, Lloyd Eisler, she won two Olympic medals and the 1993 World Championships.

== Personal life ==
Brasseur was born on July 28, 1970, in Kingsbury, Quebec. She married the American former pairs skater Rocky Marval (Marvaldi) on August 10, 1996. Their daughter, Gabriella Marvaldi, was born on November 1, 2000, in Voorhees Township, New Jersey. Brasseur has vasodepressor syncope, causing her heart to stop for 31 seconds shortly before Gabriella's birth. Her daughter is also a pairs skater and won the 2012 U.S. juvenile pairs title with partner Kyle Hogeboom.

== Career ==
Early in her career, Brasseur competed with Pascal Courchesne. They were 5th at the 1985 Skate America.

Brasseur teamed up with Eisler in 1987. At the Canadian Figure Skating Championships, they won the gold medal in 1989, came in third place in 1990, reclaimed the title in 1991, and retained it for the next three years. They won the 1993 World Championships, the first time that a non-Russian pairs team won Worlds in nine years. According to figure skating historian James R. Hines, they "skated brilliantly", winning both the short program and free skating program. They won bronze medals at the 1992 Winter Olympics and the 1994 Winter Olympics. They retired and began their "successful" professional careers, including tours with Champions on Ice, in 1994.

Brasseur and Eisler teamed up with Lou-Anne Brosseau (Hunt) in 1992 and formed a company known as B.B.E. Productions Inc. They planned and organized professional figure skating events across Canada. Their main goal was to raise awareness and funds for the Children's Wish Foundation of Canada, which named the duo national spokespersons in September 1992. B.B.E. Productions has won several awards, producing more than 25 shows and raising more than $250,000.00 in awareness and sponsorship for the charity. In the years of operation (1992–2003), B.B.E. also granted several wishes to children suffering from life-threatening illnesses.

She co-wrote a book, Brasseur & Eisler: To Catch a Dream, in 1996 and a follow-up, Brasseur & Eisler: The Professional Years.

In 1994, she and Eisler were awarded the Meritorious Service Decoration (civil division). In 1996, she was inducted into Canada's Sports Hall of Fame. In 2000, she was inducted into the Skate Canada Hall of Fame. The Colisée de St-Jean in her hometown of Saint-Jean-sur-Richelieu, Quebec was renamed Colisée Isabelle-Brasseur in her honour.

In 2009, Brasseur competed with Glenn Anderson on Battle of the Blades, a CBC production. She was eliminated during the second round of the competition. In 2010, she competed on the second season of Battle of the Blades, with partner Todd Warriner. She reached the final three and was eliminated in the semi-finals.

== Results ==
=== With Eisler ===
International
Event	1987–88	1988–89	1989–90	1990–91	1991–92	1992–93	1993–94
Olympics	9th				3rd		3rd
Worlds	7th	7th	2nd	2nd	3rd	1st	2nd
Nations Cup					1st		
NHK Trophy		4th		2nd		4th	1st
Skate Canada		1st		1st			
Trophée de France			2nd				
Piruetten							2nd
National
Canadians	2nd	1st	3rd	1st	1st	1st	1st

=== With Courchesne ===
International
Event	1984–85	1985–86
Skate America		5th
International: Junior
World Junior Championships	6th	7th
