= Jodeyne Higgins =

Canadian pair skater

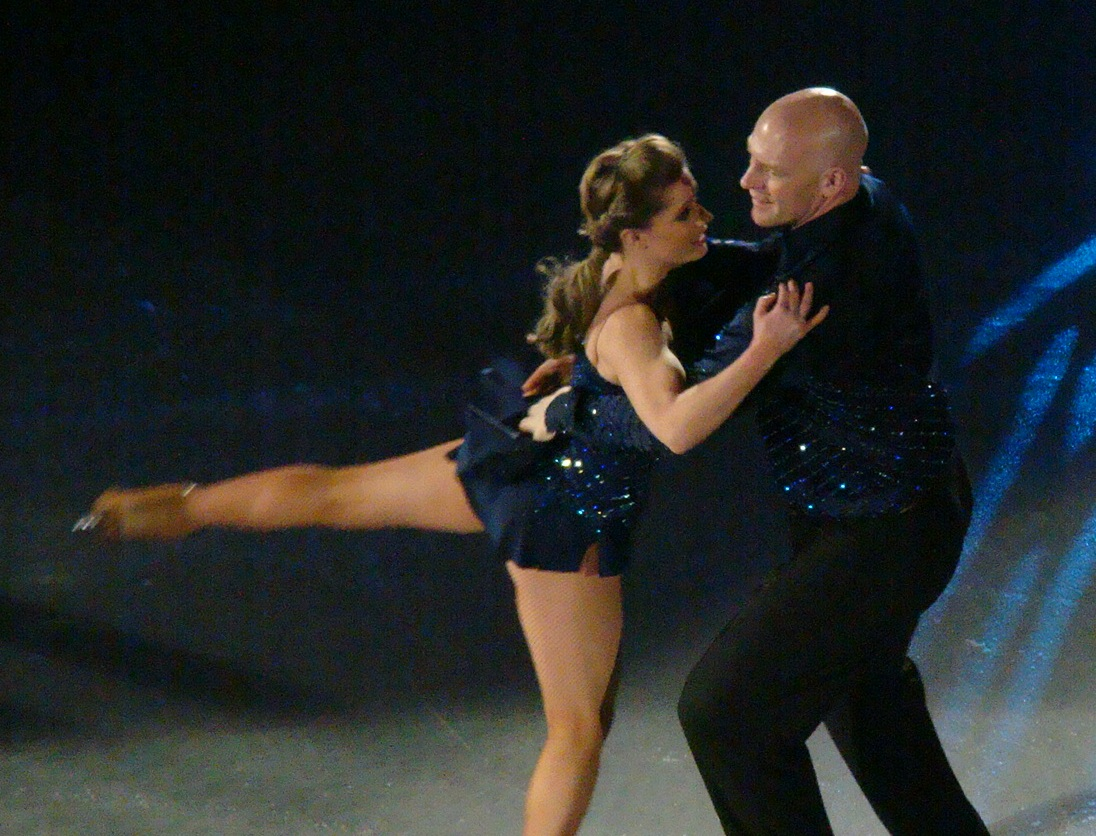
- Jodeyne Higgins and Sean Rice on the Dancing on Ice tour in 2011

Personal information
- Full name: Jodeyne Higgins
- Born: September 26, 1974 (age 51) Stratford, Ontario, Canada

Figure skating career
- Country: Canada
- Partner: Sean Rice (until his death in 2022)
- Skating club: Stratford FSC

Jodeyne Higgins (born September 26, 1974) is a Canadian former competitive pair skater who also competed in the fours discipline. With the late Sean Rice, she is the 1995 Skate Canada International bronze medalist, the 1992 Nebelhorn Trophy bronze medalist, and a two-time (1993, 1995) Canadian national bronze medallist. She is also a four-time (1993–1996) Canadian fours champion.

== Career ==
Competing in pairs, Higgins and Rice won bronze at the 1992 Nebelhorn Trophy and at the 1993 Canadian Nationals. They were assigned to the 1993 World Championships where they placed 10th. The following season was less successful for the pair. They finished 6th at Nationals and were not sent to Worlds. After winning bronze at the 1995 Canadian Championships, they obtained a second trip to Worlds and finished 14th. The pair never reached the podium again at Nationals but they won bronze at the 1995 Skate Canada International.

Competing in fours at the Canadian Championships, Higgins and Rice won gold medals with Scott MacDonald and Alison Purkiss (1994–1996), and Jodi Barnes and Rob Williams (1993). They also won the 1992 bronze medal with Janice Yeck and Scott MacDonald and the 1997 silver medal with Melissa Shields and Trevor Buttenham.

Higgins and Rice retired from competitive skating and toured professionally on Royal Caribbean International cruise ships, for whom Higgins works as the ice show director. In 2009, Higgins was a contestant on Battle of the Blades. She was paired with hockey player Ken Daneyko and was eliminated in week four. In 2011, Higgins appeared in series 6 of ITV's Dancing on Ice, with whom she reached the semi-finals. She also performed with Johnson Beharry, VC and husband Sean Rice on the 2011 Dancing On Ice Tour. In 2012, Higgins was partnered with Chico Slimani for series 7 after Chesney Hawkes injured himself in training before the start of the new series. Chico and Jodeyne finished 3rd in the Final of Dancing on Ice Series 7.

== Personal life ==
Higgins and Rice were married until his death in 2022. They have a daughter, Signey, born in October 2013.

== Competitive highlights ==
=== Pairs with Rice ===
International
Event	91–92	92–93	93–94	94–95	95–96	96–97	97–98	98–99
World Champ.		10th		14th				
GP Skate Canada					3rd	6th		
Skate America			5th					
Trophée Lalique			6th					
Nations Cup		4th		8th				
Nebelhorn Trophy		3rd						
National
Canadian Champ.	3rd J	3rd	6th	3rd	4th	4th	7th	5th
GP = Champions Series (Grand Prix); J = Junior level

=== Fours with Rice and others ===
National
Event	1992	1993	1994	1995	1996	1997
Canadian Championships	3rd^{1}	1st^{2}	1st^{3}	1st^{3}	1st^{3}	2nd^{4}
Partners in addition to Sean Rice:^{1} Janice Yeck / Scott MacDonald^{2} Jodi Barnes / Rob Williams^{3} Alison Purkiss / Scott MacDonald^{4} Melissa Shields / Trevor Buttenham
