= Sean Rice =

Canadian pair skater (1972–2022)

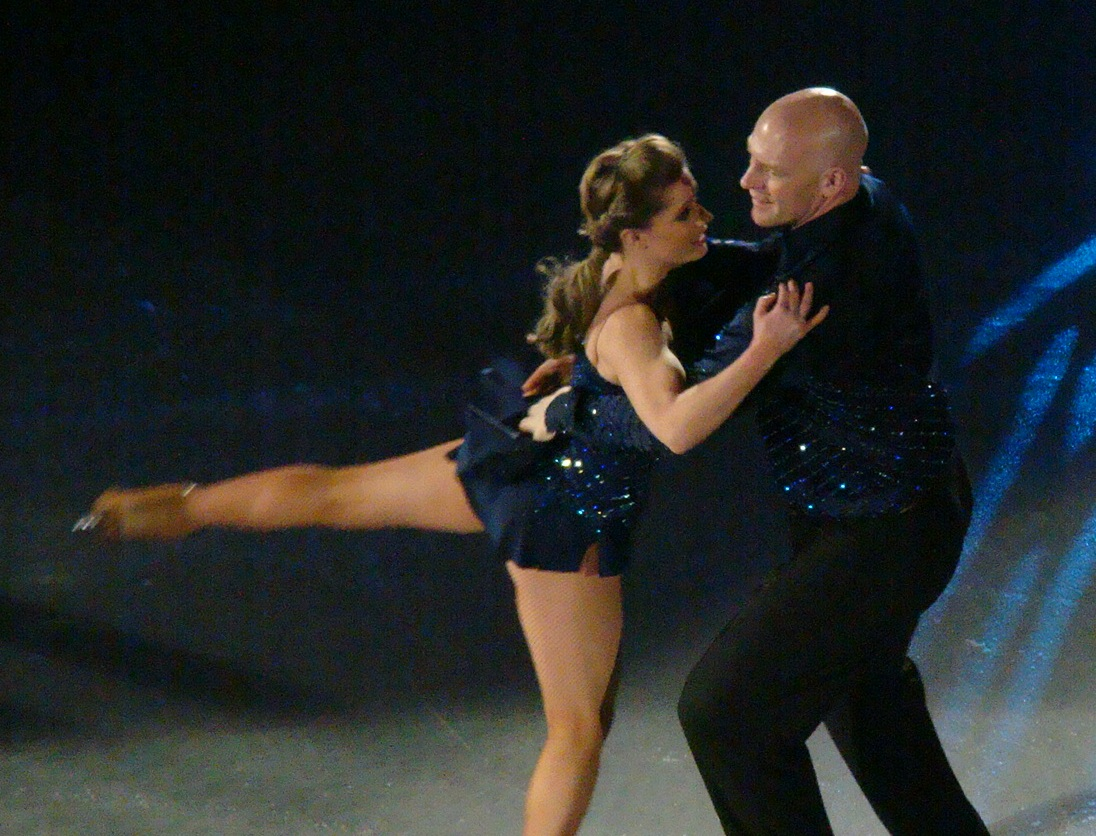
- Jodeyne Higgins and Rice on the Dancing on Ice tour in 2011

Personal information
- Full name: Sean Rice
- Born: July 20, 1972 Oakville, Ontario, Canada
- Died: January 14, 2022 (aged 49)

Figure skating career
- Country: Canada
- Skating club: Oakville SC

Sean Rice (July 20, 1972 – January 14, 2022) was a Canadian pair skater who also competed in the fours discipline. With Jodeyne Higgins, he was the 1995 Skate Canada International bronze medalist, the 1992 Nebelhorn Trophy bronze medalist, and a two-time (1993, 1995) Canadian national bronze medallist. He was also a four-time (1993–1996) Canadian fours champion.

== Career ==
Competing in pairs, Higgins and Rice won bronze at the 1992 Nebelhorn Trophy and at the 1993 Canadian Nationals. They were assigned to the 1993 World Championships where they placed 10th. The following season was less successful for the pair. They finished 6th at Nationals and were not sent to Worlds. After winning bronze at the 1995 Canadian Championships, they obtained a second trip to Worlds and finished 14th. The pair never reached the podium again at Nationals but they won bronze at the 1995 Skate Canada International.

Competing in fours at the Canadian Championships, Higgins and Rice won gold medals with Scott MacDonald and Alison Purkiss (1994–1996), and Jodi Barnes and Rob Williams (1993). They also won the 1992 bronze medal with Janice Yeck and Scott MacDonald and the 1997 silver medal with Melissa Shields and Trevor Buttenham.

After retiring from competitive skating, Higgins and Rice toured professionally on Royal Caribbean International. In 2011, Rice participated in ITV1's Dancing on Ice, partnered with British TV presenter Angela Rippon. In 2012, Rice was partnered with British Olympic skier Chemmy Alcott.

== Personal life and death ==
Higgins and Rice were married and had a daughter, Signey, born in October 2013. Rice died on January 14, 2022, at the age of 49.

== Competitive highlights ==
=== Pairs with Higgins ===
International
Event	91–92	92–93	93–94	94–95	95–96	96–97	97–98	98–99
World Champ.		10th		14th				
GP Skate Canada					3rd	6th		
Skate America			5th					
Trophée Lalique			6th					
Nations Cup		4th		8th				
Nebelhorn Trophy		3rd						
National
Canadian Champ.	3rd J	3rd	6th	3rd	4th	4th	7th	5th
GP = Champions Series (Grand Prix); J = Junior level

=== Fours with Higgins and others ===
National
Event	1992	1993	1994	1995	1996	1997
Canadian Championships	3rd^{1}	1st^{2}	1st^{3}	1st^{3}	1st^{3}	2nd^{4}
Partners in addition to Jodeyne Higgins:^{1} Janice Yeck / Scott MacDonald^{2} Jodi Barnes / Rob Williams^{3} Alison Purkiss / Scott MacDonald^{4} Melissa Shields / Trevor Buttenham

=== Earlier partnerships ===
(with Sherry Ball)

Event	1990
World Junior Championships	5th

(with Kimberly Thomson)

Event	1989
Canadian Championships	2nd N.
N. = Novice level
