= David Liu (figure skater) =

Taiwanese figure skater (born 1965)

Personal information
- Born: August 12, 1965 (age 61) Taipei, Taiwan
- Height: 1.68 m (5 ft 6 in)

Figure skating career
- Country: Chinese Taipei
- Began skating: 1973
- Retired: 1998

David Liu (Chinese: 劉中達; pinyin: Liú Zhōngdá; Wade–Giles: Liu Chung-ta; born August 12, 1965) is a Taiwanese former competitive figure skater. He won silver medals at the 1991 Piruetten and 1992 Grand Prix International St. Gervais. He represented Taiwan at three Olympics, reaching the free skate at the 1992 Winter Olympics in Albertville, where he finished 17th.

== Early life ==
Liu was born on August 12, 1965, in Taipei, Taiwan. He moved to the United States when he was six years old.

== Career ==
=== Competitive ===
Liu began skating in 1973. At the 1990 World Championships, he became the last male skater to perform a compulsory figure in a major ISU event before they were discontinued.

Liu made his first Olympic appearance at the 1988 Winter Olympics in Calgary, Alberta, Canada. Ranked 25th in the compulsory figures and 23rd in the short program, he missed the cut-off for the free skate by one spot. He reached the final segment at the 1992 Winter Olympics in Albertville, France, placing 17th in the short program, 19th in the free skate, and 17th overall.

Liu did not compete at the 1994 Winter Olympics in Lillehammer, Norway. In March, he qualified for the free skate at the 1994 World Championships in Chiba, Japan, and finished 21st overall (9th in his qualifying group, 23rd in the short, 20th in the free).

Liu placed 27th in the short program at the 1998 Winter Olympics in Nagano, Japan. He retired from eligible competition at the end of the season. During his career, he was coached by Toller Cranston and Sonya Dunfield.

=== Later career ===
Liu formerly worked as a choreographer and co-director for the Ice Theatre of New York. Since 1990, he has performed and choreographed for numerous ballet companies around the world including major companies in Japan, Taiwan, Singapore, Hong Kong, Germany and the United Kingdom. He has directed and choreographed major ice show presentations in China at the grand opening of the World Ice Arena Shenzhen in 2005 and the new World Ice Arena Hangzhou in 2010. Liu co-directs and produces ice shows with his business partner Darren Olivero of Solidwater Productions based in New York and Hong Kong.

Liu is involved in both television and dance programs in Hong Kong.

== Programs ==
Season	Short program	Free skating
1997–98		M.A.Y. in the Backyard; The Sheltering Sky by Ryuichi Sakamoto

== Results ==
International
Event	87–88	88–89	89–90	90–91	91–92	92–93	93–94	94–95	95–96	96–97	97–98
Olympics	25th				17th						27th
Worlds	25th	25th	28th	27th		31st	21st	29th		39th	31st
Piruetten					2nd		12th				
St. Gervais						2nd					
NHK Trophy	7th		14th	13th	5th	10th	10th	6th	11th	11th	
