= Jean-Michel Bombardier =

Canadian pair skater (born 1970)

Personal information
- Born: August 22, 1970 (age 56) Montreal, Quebec, Canada

Figure skating career
- Country: Canada
- Partner: Michelle Menzies; Stacey Ball; Marie-Josée Fortin
- Retired: 1998

Jean-Michel Bombardier (born August 22, 1970) is a Canadian former pair skater. With Michelle Menzies, he won two national titles and finished in the top ten at three World Championships.

== Personal life ==
Bombardier was born in Montreal, Quebec. He married fellow Canadian figure skater Josée Chouinard, and the couple had two children, twins Noah and Fiona, before separating in 2006.

== Career ==
Early in his career, Bombardier competed with Marie-Josée Fortin. With Stacey Ball, he won gold at the 1990 Nebelhorn Trophy, gold at the 1991 Skate America, and bronze at the 1991 Canadian Championships. They finished 8th at the 1991 World Championships.

In 1992, he teamed up with Michelle Menzies. The pair won two national titles, in 1995 and 1996. They won silver at the 1992 Skate Canada International and bronze the following year. They finished in the top ten at three World Championships.

== Results ==
=== With Fortin ===
International
Event	1990
International St. Gervais	1st

=== With Ball ===
International
Event	1989–90	1990–91	1991–92
World Championships		8th	
Skate America	5th	5th	1st
Nebelhorn Trophy		1st	
National
Canadian Championships		3rd	

=== With Menzies ===
International
Event	92–93	93–94	94–95	95–96	96–97	97–98
World Champ.	7th		10th	8th		
Skate America			8th			4th
Skate Canada	2nd	3rd		7th	7th	6th
Trophée Lalique	7th		10th	8th		
Nations Cup		6th				
NHK Trophy				6th	6th	
National
Canadian Champ.	2nd		1st	1st	3rd	4th
