= Jennifer Robinson (figure skater) =

Canadian figure skater

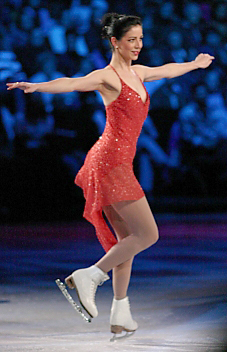
- Robinson skates in 2004.

Personal information
- Born: December 2, 1976 (age 49) Goderich, Ontario
- Height: 1.70 m (5 ft 7 in)

Figure skating career
- Country: Canada
- Skating club: Riverside Figure Skating Club
- Began skating: 1986
- Retired: 2004

Jennifer Robinson (born December 2, 1976) is a Canadian former competitive figure skater. She is a six-time national champion and finished 7th at the 2002 Winter Olympics.

== Early life ==
Robinson was born December 2, 1976, in Goderich, Ontario. She is the niece of NHL hockey player Gaston Gingras.

== Career ==
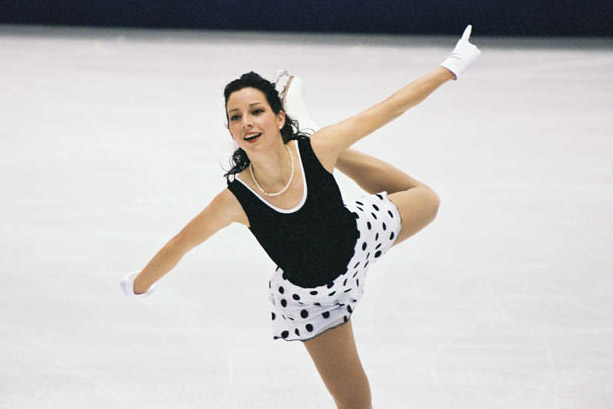
Robinson at the 2002 Winter Olympics

Robinson won six Canadian national titles. She placed as high as 8th at the World Championships (2000) and as high as 4th at the Four Continents Championships (2002). She won one Grand Prix medal, bronze, at the 1999 Skate Canada International. She finished 7th at the 2002 Olympics and retired from competition in 2004. She then skated with Stars on Ice. Robinson was one of five stunt doubles for the main character, Casey (played by Michelle Trachtenberg) in the Walt Disney Pictures's 2005 film Ice Princess.

On July 31 and August 7, 2004, Robinson made her radio-hosting debut by hosting a Saturday night retro show on CIQB-FM in Barrie, Ontario, under the direction of station program director Darren Stevens. She also hosted a dinner hour news show called First Local for the Simcoe County, Ontario public access Rogers Cable station. Robinson appears occasionally on the sports talk show Off the Record with Michael Landsberg. She was a commentator at the 2010 Winter Olympics in Vancouver, British Columbia for CTV along with Rod Black and Victor Kraatz during the Women's Figure Skating and Ice Dancing competitions.

In October 2010, Robinson was elected to Barrie City Council, representing Ward 8 in the south-central area of the city. She resigned from her position on council in August 2012, citing personal health reasons.

== Personal life ==
Robinson lives in Oro-Medonte, Ontario.

Robinson married figure skating coach Shane Dennison in September 2002. She gave birth to a girl named Reese McKenna Dennison on February 2, 2010, at the Royal Victoria Hospital in Barrie, Ontario.

== Programs ==
Season	Short program	Free skating
2003–04	Tangosain by Luis Bacalov; Welcome to Cuba by David Arnold	Prelude a L'Apres-midi d'un faune by Claude Debussy
2002–03	Symphonie Moderne by Max Steiner	Suite Populaire Espagnole pour Violin et Piano by Manuel de Falla
2001–02	Street Scene by A. Newman performed by Sam Butera	Liebestraum by Franz Liszt
2000–01	Moon Ghosts for Aldous Huxley by M. Hoppe	An Irish Symphony by H. Harty

== Results ==
GP: Champions Series / Grand Prix

International
Event	91–92	92–93	93–94	94–95	95–96	96–97	97–98	98–99	99–00	00–01	01–02	02–03	03–04
Olympics											7th		
Worlds				19th	21st			18th	8th	15th	9th	9th	14th
Four Continents								7th	6th	8th	4th	5th	5th
GP Cup of China													9th
GP Cup of Russia						8th					5th		
GP Lalique									4th				
GP Nations Cup							9th	5th				4th	
GP NHK Trophy					7th								
GP Skate America						12th		8th		7th			
GP Skate Canada					10th	5th			3rd	4th		4th	5th
Campbells Classic												6th	
Continents Cup					6th								
Inter. Challenge													4th
Nebelhorn Trophy								4th					
Schäfer Memorial				6th									
Skate Canada				6th									
International: Junior
Junior Worlds			10th										
Blue Swords			13th J										
National
Canadian Champ.	4th N	11th J	1st J	2nd	1st	3rd	3rd	1st	1st	1st	1st	1st	3rd
Levels: N. = Novice; J. = Junior
