= Michelle Menzies =

Canadian pair skater

Michelle Menzies (born April 28, 1972 in Halifax, Nova Scotia) is a Canadian former pair skater. With partner Jean-Michel Bombardier, she won the gold medal at the Canadian Figure Skating Championships in 1995 and 1996.

== Results ==
=== Pairs with Bombardier ===
International
Event	92–93	93–94	94–95	95–96	96–97	97–98
World Champ.	7th		10th	8th		
Skate America			8th			4th
Skate Canada	2nd	3rd		7th	7th	6th
Trophée Lalique	7th		10th	8th		
Nations Cup		6th				
NHK Trophy				6th	6th	
National
Canadian Champ.	2nd		1st	1st	3rd	

=== Pairs with Wheeler ===
International
Event	86–87	87–88	88–89	89–90	90–91	91–92
Goodwill Games					5th	
Internat. de Paris					3rd	
Internat. St. Gervais		1st				
Nebelhorn Trophy		1st				
NHK Trophy						6th
Prize of Moscow News			8th			
Skate America			6th	4th		
Skate Canada				3rd	3rd	2nd
St. Ivel	2nd					
Canadian Champ.			4th	4th	4th	

=== Fours with Wheeler and others ===
International
Event	86–87	87–88	88–89	89–90	90–91	91–92
Skate Canada				2nd^{4}	2nd^{1}	
National
Canadian Champ.	2nd^{1}	2nd^{2}	3rd^{3}	2nd^{4}	2nd^{1}	2nd^{1}
Partners in addition to Kevin Wheeler:^{1} Christine Hough / Doug Ladret^{2} Melanie Gaylor / Lee Barkell^{3} Alison Hughes / Jim Blackburn^{4} Patricia MacNeil / Cory Watson
