= Michelle Kwan =

American figure skater and diplomat (born 1980)

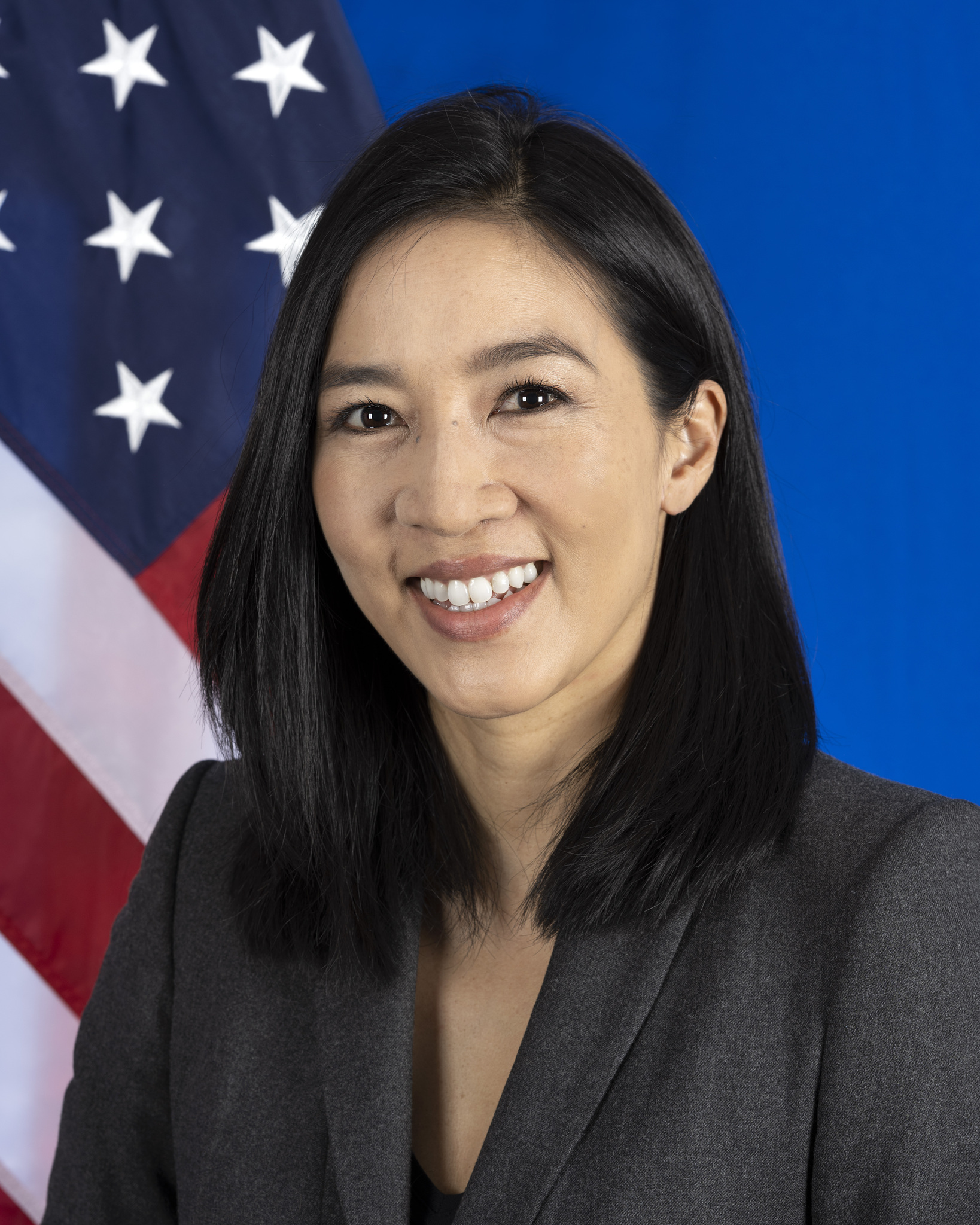
- Kwan in 2022

United States Ambassador to Belize
- In office December 5, 2022 – January 16, 2025
- President: Joe Biden
- Preceded by: Carlos R. Moreno (2017)
- Succeeded by: André Bauer

Personal details
- Born: July 7, 1980 (age 46) Torrance, California, U.S.
- Height: 5 ft 2 in (157 cm)
- Spouse: Clay Pell (m. 2013; div. 2017)
- Children: 2
- Education: University of Denver (BA); Tufts University (MALD)
- Figure skating career
- Country: United States
- Skating club: Los Angeles FSC
- Retired: 2006

Medal record
Event	Gold medal – first place	Silver medal – second place	Bronze medal – third place
Olympic Games	0	1	1
World Championships	5	3	1
Grand Prix Final	1	4	0
U.S. Championships	9	3	0
World Junior Championships	1	0	0
Medal list
Olympic Games
Silver medal – second place	1998 Nagano	Singles
Bronze medal – third place	2002 Salt Lake City	Singles
World Championships
Gold medal – first place	1996 Edmonton	Singles
Gold medal – first place	1998 Minneapolis	Singles
Gold medal – first place	2000 Nice	Singles
Gold medal – first place	2001 Vancouver	Singles
Gold medal – first place	2003 Washington D.C.	Singles
Silver medal – second place	1997 Lausanne	Singles
Silver medal – second place	1999 Helsinki	Singles
Silver medal – second place	2002 Nagano	Singles
Bronze medal – third place	2004 Dortmund	Singles
Grand Prix Final
Gold medal – first place	1995–96 Paris	Singles
Silver medal – second place	1996–97 Hamilton	Singles
Silver medal – second place	1999–2000 Lyon	Singles
Silver medal – second place	2000–01 Tokyo	Singles
Silver medal – second place	2001–02 Kitchener	Singles
U.S. Championships
Gold medal – first place	1996 San Jose	Singles
Gold medal – first place	1998 Philadelphia	Singles
Gold medal – first place	1999 Salt Lake City	Singles
Gold medal – first place	2000 Cleveland	Singles
Gold medal – first place	2001 Boston	Singles
Gold medal – first place	2002 Los Angeles	Singles
Gold medal – first place	2003 Dallas	Singles
Gold medal – first place	2004 Atlanta	Singles
Gold medal – first place	2005 Portland	Singles
Silver medal – second place	1994 Detroit	Singles
Silver medal – second place	1995 Providence	Singles
Silver medal – second place	1997 Nashville	Singles
World Junior Championships
Gold medal – first place	1994 Colorado Springs	Singles

Chinese name
- Traditional Chinese: 關穎珊
- Simplified Chinese: 关颖珊
Transcriptions
Standard Mandarin
- Hanyu Pinyin: Guān Yǐngshān
- Wade–Giles: Kuan^{1} Ying^{3} Shan^{1}
Yue: Cantonese
- Yale Romanization: Gwāan Wihng Sāan
- Jyutping: Gwaan1 Wing6 Saan1

Michelle Wingshan Kwan (born July 7, 1980) is an American former competitive figure skater and diplomat who served as United States Ambassador to Belize from 2022 to 2025. In figure skating Kwan is a two-time Olympic medalist (silver in 1998, bronze in 2002), a five-time world champion (1996, 1998, 2000, 2001, 2003) and a nine-time U.S. champion (1996, 1998–2005). She is tied with Maribel Vinson for the all-time National Championship record.

She competed at the senior level for over a decade and is the most decorated figure skater in U.S. history. She is known for her consistency and artistry on ice.

For well over a decade, Kwan maintained her status not only as America's most popular figure skater but as one of America's most popular female athletes. Kwan landed numerous major endorsement deals, starred in multiple TV specials and was the subject of extensive media coverage. From 1997 to 2005, she was the U.S. Figure Skating Association's top-paid skater in appearance fees and prize money, as well as one of the highest paid Winter Olympic athletes in endorsements. Kwan was also the highest-paid skater on the Champions on Ice tours.

Following her figure skating career, Kwan became active in politics, particularly with the Democratic Party. In January 2022, President Joe Biden nominated Kwan to be U.S. Ambassador to Belize. She was confirmed by the Senate on September 29, 2022, took the oath of office on October 22, and presented her credentials on December 5. Her tenure concluded at the end of the Biden administration on January 16, 2025.

== Early life and education ==
Kwan was born on July 7, 1980, in Torrance, California, a suburb of Los Angeles. She is the third child of Danny Kwan and Estella Kwan, immigrants from Hong Kong. Her father was a native of Canton who emigrated from Hong Kong to California in 1971. Kwan grew up speaking both Cantonese and English at home.

Kwan's interest in figure skating began at the age of five, when she followed her two older siblings (ice hockey player Ron and figure skater Karen) onto the ice. Karen and Michelle began serious training when Michelle was about 8 years old. They practiced three to four hours a day, waking up at 4:30 a.m. and arriving at the rink at 5 a.m. to skate before school, then going back to the rink right after school to skate again. Paying for their increased skating-rink time led to financial hardship for Kwan's working-class family. When Kwan was 10 years old, her family could no longer afford a coach, but they were offered financial assistance by a fellow member of the Los Angeles Figure Skating Club that allowed them to train at the Ice Castle International Training Center in Lake Arrowhead, California.

Kwan attended Soleado Elementary School in Palos Verdes, California, but left public school to be homeschooled in 1994, when she was in the 8th grade. After graduation from Rim of the World High School in 1998, Kwan attended University of California, Los Angeles (UCLA) for one year.

In the fall of 2006, she transferred to the University of Denver (DU). Kwan mentioned that her attendance at DU marked a significant "turning point" in her life. She made the shift from having had tutors since 7th grade and being a full-time skater to becoming a full-time student. During her initial weeks at DU, she had to use crutches due to hip surgery. (Note: Kwan initially injured her right hip in 2002; she re-injured the hip during the 2004-2005 season of Champions on Ice, for which she had arthroscopic hip surgery to repair a torn cartilage in August 2006.) (Note: On July 4, 2026, Kwan announced that she had undergone a right hip replacement.)

Shortly after her arrival at DU, Kwan engaged in an international studies internship. Condoleezza Rice, the former Secretary of State, appointed Kwan as the inaugural American Public Diplomacy Envoy. Her role was to foster a better understanding of America by sharing her personal story through cross-cultural dialogues with international students.

Kwan mentioned the challenges of balancing travel and school, recounting instances when she had to take exams on campus shortly after returning from a 15-hour flight. She applied the knowledge gained in her classroom to her international endeavors.

In June 2009, she graduated from Denver's Josef Korbel School of International Studies with a bachelor's degree in international studies and a minor in political science. In 2009, she began graduate studies in international relations at the Fletcher School of Law and Diplomacy at Tufts University and graduated in 2011. On May 8, 2010, she was awarded an honorary Doctor of Humane Letters from Southern Vermont College.

== Career ==
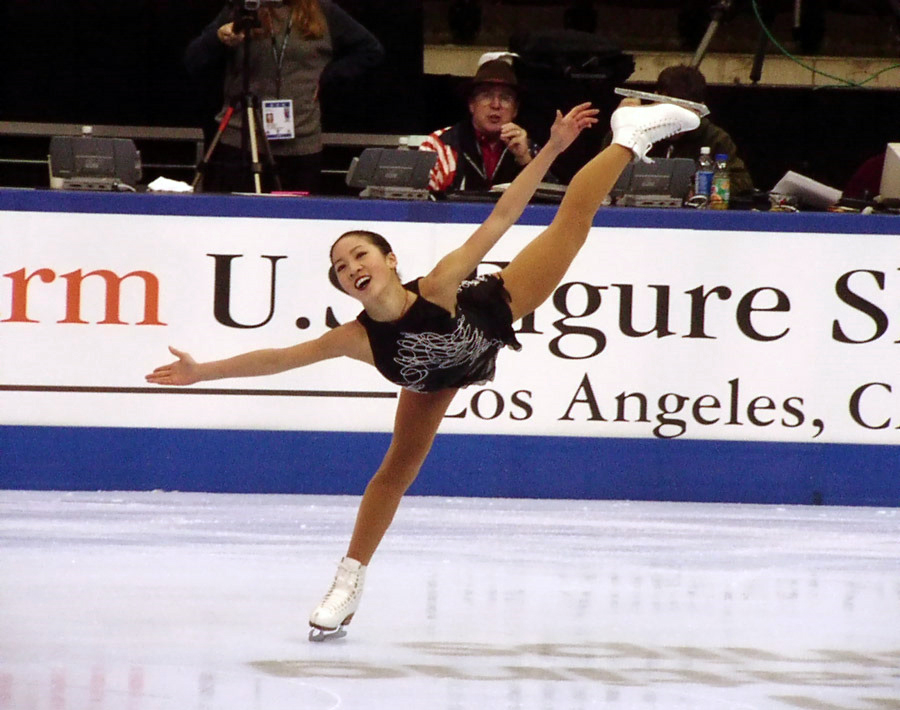
Michelle Kwan performing her signature spiral at a practice session at the 2002 U.S. Figure Skating Championships

Kwan won five World Championships (1996, 1998, 2000, 2001, 2003), tying her with Carol Heiss (1956–1960) for the most world titles by an American. Kwan's nine world medals overall is the all-time record for an American skater in any discipline. The only ladies' singles skater with more world titles or medals is Sonja Henie of Norway. Kwan won nine U.S. Championships (1996, 1998–2005), tying the record for most wins set by Maribel Vinson-Owen (1928–1933, 1935–1937). She holds the record for the most consecutive U.S. titles (eight) and most consecutive U.S. Championship medals (twelve). She also earned the silver medal at the 1998 Nagano Olympics and the bronze medal in the 2002 Salt Lake City Olympics. Kwan has received a combined total of 57 perfect marks (6.0s) at major competitions, the singles record under the former 6.0 judging system.

=== Early competition ===
In 1991, Michelle Kwan and her sister Karen began training with Frank Carroll in Lake Arrowhead, California. After one year of coaching by Carroll, 11-year-old Michelle placed 9th at the junior level at the United States Figure Skating Championships. At the age of 12 in 1992, Michelle passed the gold test to become a senior-level figure skater despite the disapproval of her coach. In 1993, Kwan finished sixth at her first senior U.S. championships. The next season, she won the 1994 World Junior Championships.

In 1994, Kwan finished second to Tonya Harding at the U.S. Championships, which ordinarily would have placed her on the U.S. team to the 1994 Olympic Games in Lillehammer, Norway. That place was instead given to 1993 national champion Nancy Kerrigan, who had been sidelined by an assault and battery (eventually connected to Harding's ex-husband Jeff Gillooly) after a practice session at those championships. The 13-year-old Kwan went to Norway as an alternate but did not compete. Kerrigan and Harding both dropped out of eligible competition before the 1994 World Championships. Because of this (and teammate Nicole Bobek not making it out of the qualifying round), Kwan had the sole responsibility to ensure two entries for the U.S. at the 1995 World Championships by placing in the top ten. Kwan had an unusual mistake in the short program and placed eleventh in that portion of the competition, but skated a strong freestyle program and finished eighth overall.

At the 1995 U.S. Championships, Nicole Bobek won the gold medal, while Kwan again placed second after struggling with her lutz jump in both the short program and free skate. At the 1995 World Championships, Kwan was in fifth place after the short program. She skated last in the free skate, giving the best performance of her career up to that point, completing all seven of her triple jumps, and "exuding joy and enthusiasm". She finished in third place in the free skate, behind Chen Lu from China, who came in first place, and French skater Surya Bonaly, who came in second. Kwan came in fourth place overall, behind American Nicole Bobek, who came in third place overall, even though she came in fourth place in the free skate and despite Kwan's successful execution of her jumps, which were second in difficulty behind Bonaly's.

=== Artistic development and 1998 Olympics ===
Kwan began to develop a more mature style during the 1995 season. She used "Romanza" for her short program and in her free skate, music from "Salome's dance" from the film score King of Kings by Miklós Rózsa and "The Dance of the Seven Veils" from the Richard Strauss opera Salome, both pieces depicting the Biblical story of Salome seducing King Herod. She also improved her extension, speed and jump technique, and performed to more difficult choreography. Carroll defended their decision to make Kwan appear more mature by stating that they were giving the judges what they wanted, saying, "The judges were looking for the ladies' champion of the world, not the girls' champion of the world".

In both her practices and during her performance at Skate America, Kwan wore her hair in a bun instead of a ponytail and wore heavy theatrical makeup, including rhinestones pasted near the corner of her eyes. Her costume consisted of "a short-sleeved rich purple dress with rhinestone-studded flesh-colored fabric across the midriff and deep front and black necklines, ornamated with elaborate sequined floral patterns in gold and bright pastels". According to writer Ellyn Kestnbaum, Kwan was inspired more to the music than to the narrative, which as Kestnbaum criticized, revealed Kwan as "a sexual being". Kestnbaum stated, however, that she found it difficult to construct a linear narrative about the seductive Salome, but that Kwan's moves "might better represent a young woman venturing confidently into the world, encountering loss and confusion, but ultimately finding peace and triumph". (Note: See Kestnbaum, pp. 48–53, for her "deep reading" of Kwan's Salome program.) Kestnbaum also stated that Kwan's movements in the program evoked "images of a sensual, luxurious, exotic Middle East".

Kwan's free skate consisted of seven successfully executed triple jumps, including two triple Lutz jumps, one of which was done in combination and was debuted at Skate America and the other preceded by intricate steps. Other elements, such as the complexity of her steps that connected these elements and her spin positions' originality and variety, also contributed to the program's difficulty and artistry. Kestnbaum insists that Kwan's increased speed, the strong debut of her triple-triple jump, and her improved poise, precision, and posture "say more than her hairstyle or makeup about her new maturity as a skater". Kestnbaum states that Kwan's fellow competitors were better in how they executed flow across the ice, speed, and height of their jumps and that although Kwan exhibited more caution and control than her competitors, she skated with "new power and excitement compared to her younger self". Kestnbaum credits the success of the Salome program to Kwan's intricate choreography, which featured emotional depth during the program's heavier moments and frequent reversals of direction that often unexpectedly led to spins or jumps. Kwan ended up winning Skate America in 1995.

Kwan won both the U.S. Championships and the World Championships in 1996. In the later event, she edged out defending champion Chen Lu in a very close competition in which both competitors garnered two perfect 6.0s for Presentation in the free skate. She was the third youngest figure skater to hold both titles. The 1996–97 season marked the beginning of a winning streak for Kwan that lasted more than a year, from the fall of 1995 to the fall of 1996. As Kestnbaum put it, Kwan became "the most consistent and well-rounded skater in the [women's] field, taking on an almost legendary mystique as she continued to mature as a feminine artistic skater emphasizing beauty, musicality, and dramatic storylines concerned with love and death".

In the 1996–97 season, Kwan skated to "Dream of Desdemona" (short program) and "Taj Mahal" (free skate). During this season, Kwan struggled with her jumps because of a growth spurt, which affected her balance on her jump, and problems with new skating boots which she wore for an endorsement contract with the manufacturer. She won the short program at the 1997 U.S. Nationals, but fell early in her free skate and as she later stated, "panicked" and made several more errors. She lost to Tara Lipinski, who came in first place in her free skate. Three weeks later, at the Champion Series Final, she again lost to Lipinski, who completed more successful jumps than Kwan in both the short program and free skate. At the 1997 World Championships, Kwan came in second place, behind Lipinski, who won the gold medal. Kwan came in fourth place in her short program due to an unsuccessful jump combination while Lipinski came in first place and Irina Slutskaya, who missed her combination jump, came in sixth place. All three skaters performed well during their free skates, each earning first-place ordinals from three of the nine judges. Kwan won the free skate, with Lipinski coming in second place and Slutskaya coming in third place. Kwan's jumps in her free skate were not as difficult as Lipinski and Slutskaya's, but her skating between her jumps was more complex and demonstrated "more polished refinement". Overall, Lipinski came in first place, Kwan came in second place, and Slutskaya came in fourth place behind Vanessa Gusmeroli of France.

Going into the 1997—98 Olympic season, the American press "play[ed] up the Kwan-Lipinski rivalry for all it was worth". According to Kestnbaum, Kwan's programs emphasized sophistication and pure skating, which Kestnbaum called "a change of pace" from her previous two seasons, which featured dramatic storylines. Kestbaum also called both Kwan's programs "carefully choreographed expressions of joy". For Kwan's short program, she chose piano music by Rachmaninoff, and for her free skating program, she chose music from the concerto Lyra Angelica by William Alwyn. She came in first place at Skate America, winning both the short program and free skate, while Lipinski came in second place. She also won Skate Canada, but suffered a stress fracture on her foot and was forced to withdraw from her third Champions Series Final. Kwan regained her U.S. title from Lipinski at the 1998 National Championships, despite her fractured toe. Her injury prevented her from attempting her triple toe-triple toe combination, but she completed all seven jumps in her free program earning 6.0s from eight of the nine judges. As Kestnbaum put it, Kwan "skated with a transcendent floating quality that was becoming her trademark". Many people consider her performances at the 1998 U.S. Championships to be the high point of her career from both a technical and artistic standpoint. Both performances earned her fifteen perfect 6.0s and left two judges in tears.

Kwan and Lipinski were co-favorites to win the 1998 Olympic Games in Nagano, Japan. Kwan placed first in the short program, winning eight first place votes out of nine judges, while Lipinski came in second place. In the free skate, Kwan, who skated first in the final group, executed a clean seven-triple performance but placed behind Lipinski, who also did seven triples including a triple loop/triple loop combination and a triple toe-loop/half-loop/triple Salchow. Kwan's performance was "graceful and well-measured, filled with complex edging and unusual moves such as a sequence of spins in both directions". Kestnbaum called Kwan's free skate "tentative and slow" as compared to her performance at Nationals. Her jumps were more difficult and bigger than Lipinski's, but Kwan's were not as high and did not cover as much ice as her competitors' jumps. Lipinski's spins were faster than Kwan's. The judges awarded Lipinski with higher technical scores and gave both Lipinski and Kwan the same presentation scores, mostly 5.9s, although Lipinski won the free skate. Kwan ended up winning the silver medal, with the gold medal going to Lipinski and the bronze medal to Chen Lu.

Lipinski and Chen both retired from competitive skating shortly after the Olympics, while Kwan went on to win the 1998 World Championships in Minneapolis.

=== From 1998 to 2002 Olympics ===
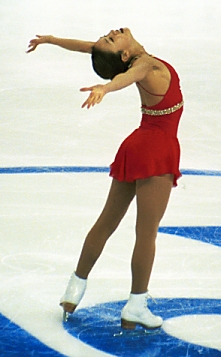
Kwan completing her Scheherazade long program at the 2001–02 Grand Prix of Figure Skating Final in Ontario, Canada

Kwan continued to compete as an eligible skater in the 1998–99 season, although she bypassed the fall Grand Prix season and instead chose to skate in a series of made-for-television pro-am events. Her "regular" competitive programs that season were "Fate of Carmen" (short program) and "Lamento D'Ariane" (free skate). Kwan won her third national title at the 1999 U.S. Championships, competing against a weak field. At the 1999 World Championships, Kwan did not skate her best, and placed second behind Russian competitor Maria Butyrskaya.

Kwan's win at the 2000 U.S. Nationals was controversial to some. She was criticized for planning an easier solo jump in her short program than some of her competitors (a triple toe loop rather than a triple flip), and fell on this element in the competition. The judges nevertheless placed her third in that segment behind younger challengers Sasha Cohen and Sarah Hughes; however, the placement still kept her in contention for the title. Ultimately, she won the free skate with the best performance of the night, capturing 8 of the 9 first-place ordinals. At the 2000 World Championships, Kwan was again in third place after the short program, behind Maria Butyrskaya and Irina Slutskaya. In her free skate, Kwan landed seven triple jumps, including a triple toe loop/triple toe loop combination, and won that segment of the competition. Butyrskaya lost her commanding lead by finishing third behind Slutskaya in the free skate, allowing Kwan to win the overall title as well.

During the 2000–2001 season, Kwan began working with the famed designer (and former figure skater) Vera Wang, who designed most of her competition and exhibition costumes for the next six years. Kwan was only the second figure skater Wang designed for, following Nancy Kerrigan. At that year's national championships, Kwan again won the title, receiving first-place ordinals from all 9 judges in both the short program and free skate. At the 2001 World Championships, Kwan was second behind Slutskaya in the short program. Kwan won the title with her "Song of the Black Swan" free skate, executing 7 triples, including a triple toe loop/triple toe loop combination.

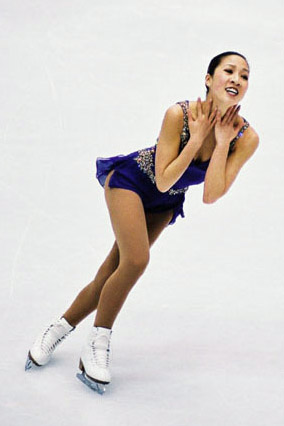
Kwan performing her short program at the 2002 Winter Olympics

Kwan and Carroll decided to end their coaching relationship two days before the start of the 2001 Skate America competition. In interviews, Kwan said she needed to "take responsibility" for her skating. Coachless, Kwan arrived at the 2002 U.S. Championships in Los Angeles amid the media's scrutiny over her separation with Carroll and her season's inconsistencies. Kwan won the competition with a revived "Rachmaninoff" short program and a new "Scheherazade" program for her free skate, securing a place on the 2002 Olympic team. Joining her on the team were Sasha Cohen (second) and Sarah Hughes (third). The 21-year-old Kwan and Russia's Irina Slutskaya were favorites to win the gold. Kwan led after the short program, followed by Slutskaya, Cohen, and Hughes. In the free skate, Kwan two-footed her triple toe loop combination and fell on her triple flip, while Sarah Hughes skated a clean program and won the free skate. Kwan finished 3rd in the free skate, behind Hughes and Slutskaya, and as a result Kwan won the bronze medal behind Hughes and Slutskaya. Kwan's final event of the season was the 2002 Worlds, where she won the silver medal behind Slutskaya.

=== 2002–2006 ===
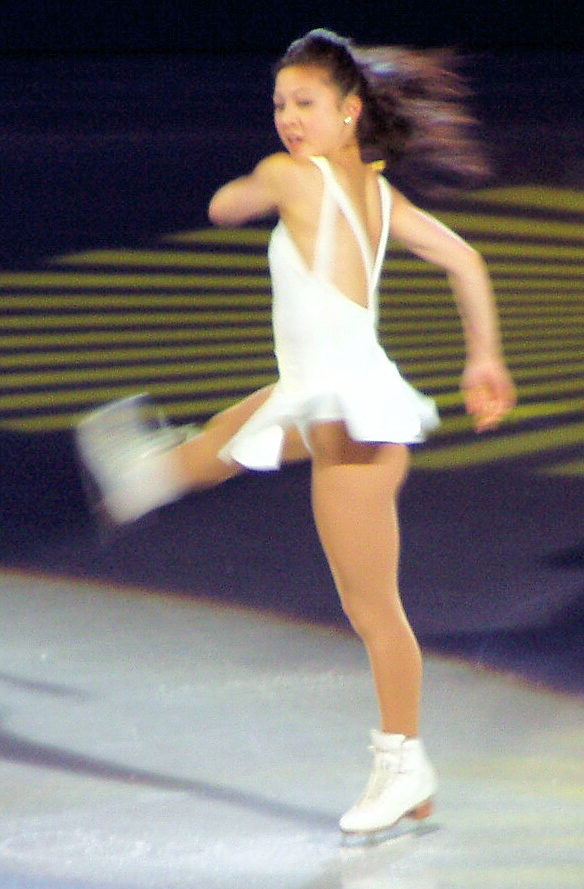
Kwan skating to "Fallin'" in the 2004 World Figure Skating Championships in Dortmund, Germany

Kwan began working with coach Scott Williams in the summer of 2002. She continued to compete on the Olympic-eligible circuit, although in a more limited way. During the fall seasons of 2002 to 2004, Kwan competed in only one Grand Prix event, Skate America in the fall of 2002, which she entered as a last-minute replacement. She won the event and qualified for the Grand Prix Final but chose not to compete in it. Kwan chose to not compete in Grand Prix events in the 2003 and 2004 seasons where the new judging system was being used. Kwan won all phases of every competition she entered in the 2002–2003 competitive season with her programs: Peter Gabriel's "The Feeling Begins" from The Last Temptation of Christ (short program) and "Concierto de Aranjuez" (free skate). She won the U.S. Championships again and regained her World title.

In autumn 2003, she hired the noted technician Rafael Arutyunyan as her coach, with whom she attempted to increase the technical difficulty of her programs and hone her jump technique. In the 2003–2004 competitive season, she skated again to "The Feeling Begins" for her short program, and Puccini's "Tosca" for her long program. Again, Kwan won the U.S. Championships, earning seven more 6.0s for presentation during the free skating. At the 2004 World Championships, after a difficult qualifying round, Kwan was penalized in her short program for going two seconds over the time limit. This caused her to place fourth going into the long program, behind American Sasha Cohen, Japan's Shizuka Arakawa, and Miki Ando. Kwan skated a clean performance with five triples and received the last 6.0 marks given at the World Championships. She placed second in the free skating portion (she was one judge short from winning the free skating) and placed third overall, behind Arakawa (who performed seven triples, including two triple-triple combinations) and Cohen.

For the 2004–2005 competitive season, Kwan skated her long program to "Boléro", choreographed by British ice dancer Christopher Dean who had famously skated to the music with Jayne Torvill two decades before, and debuted a new short program, "Adagio" from Aram Khachaturian's ballet Spartacus. At the U.S. Championships, she won her 9th title, tying the all-time record previously set by Maribel Vinson-Owen. Vinson-Owen had coached Frank Carroll, who in turn coached Kwan. At the 2005 World Championship, Kwan competed for the first time under the new judging system. She had a rough qualifying round and placed third in the short program. In the free skate, Kwan fell on her triple salchow and two-footed a triple lutz. Although she finished third in both the short and long program portion of the competition, Kwan was edged by Carolina Kostner for the bronze medal and finished fourth overall, missing third place by 0.37 points. It was the first time since 1995 that Kwan had failed to medal at any international competition, and would be her final competitive event.

==== 2006 Olympics ====
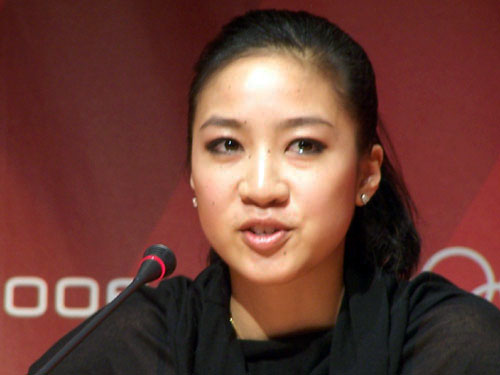
Kwan announcing her withdrawal from the 2006 Winter Olympics in Turin, Italy, February 12, 2006

Kwan looked at the 2005 Worlds as a learning experience in the ISU Judging System. She continued to train and stated that she would attempt to qualify for the 2006 Olympic Games in Turin, Italy. However, following a hip injury, she was forced to withdraw from her three planned competitions in the fall of 2005. Kwan skated her new short program ("Totentanz") at a made-for-TV event in December 2005, but her performance was well below her usual standard. On January 4, 2006, Kwan withdrew from the U.S. Figure Skating Championships with an abdominal injury incurred in December 2005. One week later, she filed a petition with the USFSA for a medical waiver to be placed on the 2006 Olympic figure skating team. On January 14, 2006, after the United States ladies' figure skating event, the USFSA's International Committee met and in a 20 to 3 vote approved Kwan's petition under the stipulation that she show her physical and competitive readiness to a five-member monitoring panel by January 27.

Kwan performed her long and short programs for the panel on the stipulated day, and her spot on the Olympic team was established, as the panel felt she was fit to compete. However, on February 12, 2006, the United States Olympic Committee announced that Kwan had withdrawn from the Games after suffering a new groin injury in her first practice in Turin. Kwan remarked that she "respected the Olympics too much to compete". The Turin organizing committee accepted the USOC's application for Emily Hughes (who had finished third at the U.S. Championships) to compete as Kwan's replacement.

After her withdrawal from the Olympic team, Kwan turned down an offer to stay in Turin as a figure skating commentator for NBC Sports. During an interview with Bob Costas and Scott Hamilton, Kwan said she was not retiring yet.

Kwan underwent elective arthroscopic surgery in August 2006 to repair a torn labrum in her right hip, an old injury which she traces back to 2002. According to Kwan, the surgery allowed her to skate pain-free for the first time in four years.

=== After 2006 ===
Kwan did not compete during the 2006–2007 figure skating season.

Kwan told the Associated Press in October 2007 that she would decide in 2009 if she planned to compete in the 2010 Winter Olympics, but she ultimately decided not to do so, focusing instead on graduate school. She has said "Representing the United States as an American Public Diplomacy Envoy the past three years has been very rewarding, and I want to do more." After graduating from the University of Denver in 2009, Kwan said "Furthering my education will bring me closer to that goal, and I don't want to wait any longer to continue the journey."

On February 17, 2010, Kwan told ABC News in an interview that she was continuing her studies as a graduate student at the Tufts University Fletcher School of Law and Diplomacy, as well as continuing her work as a Public Diplomacy Envoy. Kwan also said she would be commentating for Good Morning America at the 2010 Winter Olympics.

In August 2009, Kwan made her first on-ice appearance in several years, performing at Ice All Stars, a show headlined by South Korean world champion Yuna Kim in Seoul, South Korea. Kim considered Kwan her idol growing up. Kwan also later appeared in Kim's All That Skate shows in South Korea and Los Angeles.

She was chosen as the guest of honor to help open a new synthetic ice rink at the Marina Bay Sands resort in Singapore in December 2010, where she performed a modified routine to "Winter Song", a program she self-choreographed with her sister. She returned to Singapore a month later as a Public Diplomacy Envoy to meet local students and to promote ice skating in the tropical country.

As of 2008, Kwan is a member of the Chinese-American organization Committee of 100. In 2014, Kwan joined Fox Sports 1 for its Winter Olympics broadcast.

== Skating technique ==
Kwan was known for her unrivaled consistency in delivering clean programs, as well as her strong skating skills and deep, quiet edges that have been described as "silent blades" that "barely whispered". She was also known for her musicality and ability to combine grace and artistry with athleticism.

Although not of the greatest height nor explosive spring, Kwan, for most of her career, included all of the triples (except for the Axel) in her programs, including two lutzes (the most difficult jump after the Axel). She landed the triple toe-triple toe combination cleanly eleven times in competition, including at her 2000 and 2001 world championship victories. During the 2004–2005 season, she debuted a triple flip-double toe-double loop combination.

Beginning in the 1996–1997 season, Kwan debuted a change of edge spiral that soon became her signature move. Kwan's spiral was famed by commentators not only for its great extension and line, but also its speed, the strength and security of the edge, the deep lean and the easy smoothness of the change of edge. In the 1998–1999 season, Kwan revived a variation of the Charlotte spiral, a move innovated by German skater Charlotte Oelschlägel which had not been performed in decades.

Kwan's split falling leaf was praised by fellow skaters Dick Button and Peggy Fleming during competitions, for its effortlessness and perfect split position in the air. Kwan has done multiple split falling leaves in immediate succession (without any turns or steps in between) while maintaining a split position on both.

Another of her trademark moves is a Y-spin done consecutively on both feet. Kwan is also one of the few skaters who can spin in both directions.

== Awards and accolades ==
Kwan is a recipient of the prestigious James E. Sullivan Award (2001), which is given to America's best amateur athlete; she was the first figure skater to win the award since Dick Button in 1949. In 2003, she was named the United States Olympic Committee (USOC) "Sportswoman of the Year", and is the 5th figure skater in history to receive this honor. She has also been named USOC "Athlete of the Month" fourteen times, which is more than any other athlete, male or female, as well as being named "Female Figure Skating Athlete of the Year" by the USOC multiple times. She is also the recipient of the USOC's "Citizenship Through Sports Alliance Award" (2004).

Kwan is one of only two multiple winners of the "Readers' Choice Figure Skater of the Year" award given by Skating magazine, winning it an unprecedented seven times (1994, 1996, 1998, 1999, 2001–2003). In 2003, the United States Figure Skating Association, which publishes Skating, announced that the award would be renamed the "Michelle Kwan Trophy". The USFSA stated that although Kwan may continue to skate competitively, she would no longer be eligible for the award. The only other skater to win the award multiple times, Johnny Weir, only won it twice in comparison.

- In 1999, Kwan was given the Historymakers Award by the Los Angeles Chinese American Museum.
- In May 2000, Kwan was selected as one of People magazine's 50 most beautiful people.
- In 2002, Kwan won the Teen Choice Award for favorite female athlete.
- In 2002, Kwan was chosen as Cosmogirl of the year.
- In 2002 and 2003, Kwan won the Nickelodeon Kids Choice Award for favorite female athlete.
- In 2005, Kwan traveled to Beijing to accept an award for being the "female athlete kids in China most admire" at the inaugural CCTV-Nickelodeon Kids' Choice Honors.
- In 2007, the Women's Sports Foundation honored Kwan with the Billie Jean Award for her contribution to women's sports.
- In May 2009, Kwan was honored by the Los Angeles Chinese Historical Society of Southern California in "Celebrating Chinese Americans in Sports".
- In 2010, Kwan received an honorary doctorate's degree from Southern Vermont College and delivered the commencement speech for that year's graduation.
- In 2012, Kwan was the sole inductee for the United States Figure Skating Hall of Fame. She was also the sole inductee for the 2012 World Figure Skating Hall of Fame.
- In 2014, Kwan was honored by Harlem Skating for her career.
- In 2017, Kwan was inducted into the California sports Hall of Fame.

== Public life ==
=== Diplomatic positions ===
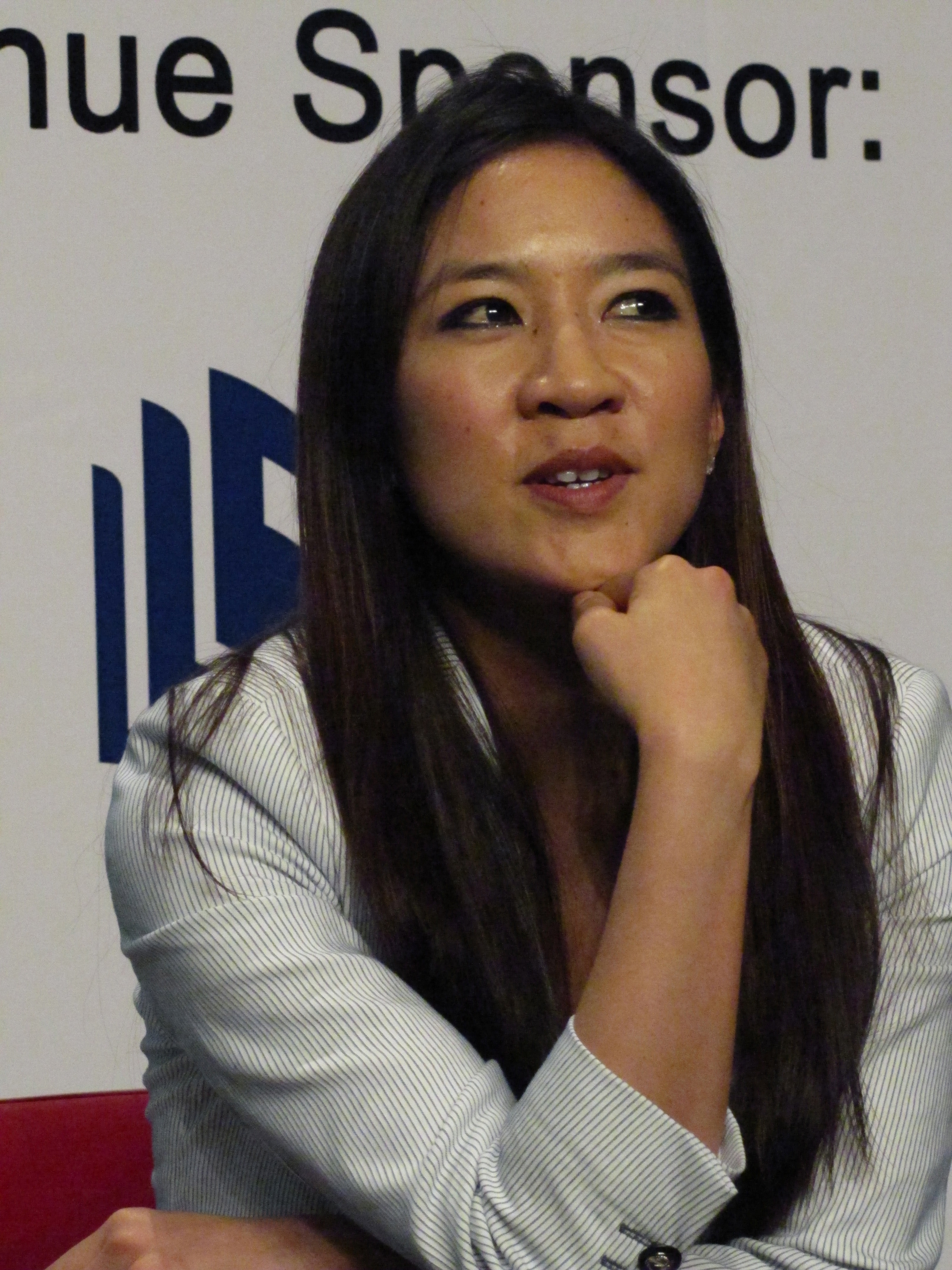
Kwan in Singapore, January 2011

On November 9, 2006, Secretary of State Condoleezza Rice named Michelle Kwan as a public diplomacy ambassador. In this non-salaried position, Kwan represented American values, especially to young people and sports enthusiasts, and traveled widely. Kwan made her first overseas trip in the capacity of public diplomacy ambassador with a visit to China from January 17–25, 2007.

Her diplomatic position as an envoy continued in the Barack Obama administration where she worked with then Vice President Joe Biden and Secretary of State Hillary Clinton.

Following her first trip to China as a public diplomacy envoy, Kwan continued her role in subsequent trips to Russia in June 2007, Argentina in March 2008, Ukraine in February 2009, South Korea in January 2010, and Singapore in January 2011.

On April 15, 2011, it was announced that Kwan would serve as an adviser to the U.S.-China Women's Leadership Exchange and Dialogue (Women-LEAD). In December 2012, Kwan was appointed as a State Department senior adviser for public diplomacy and public affairs.

In June 2015, Kwan announced that she would support Hillary Clinton's campaign efforts by working on outreach efforts from Clinton's headquarters in Brooklyn.

==== United States ambassador to Belize ====
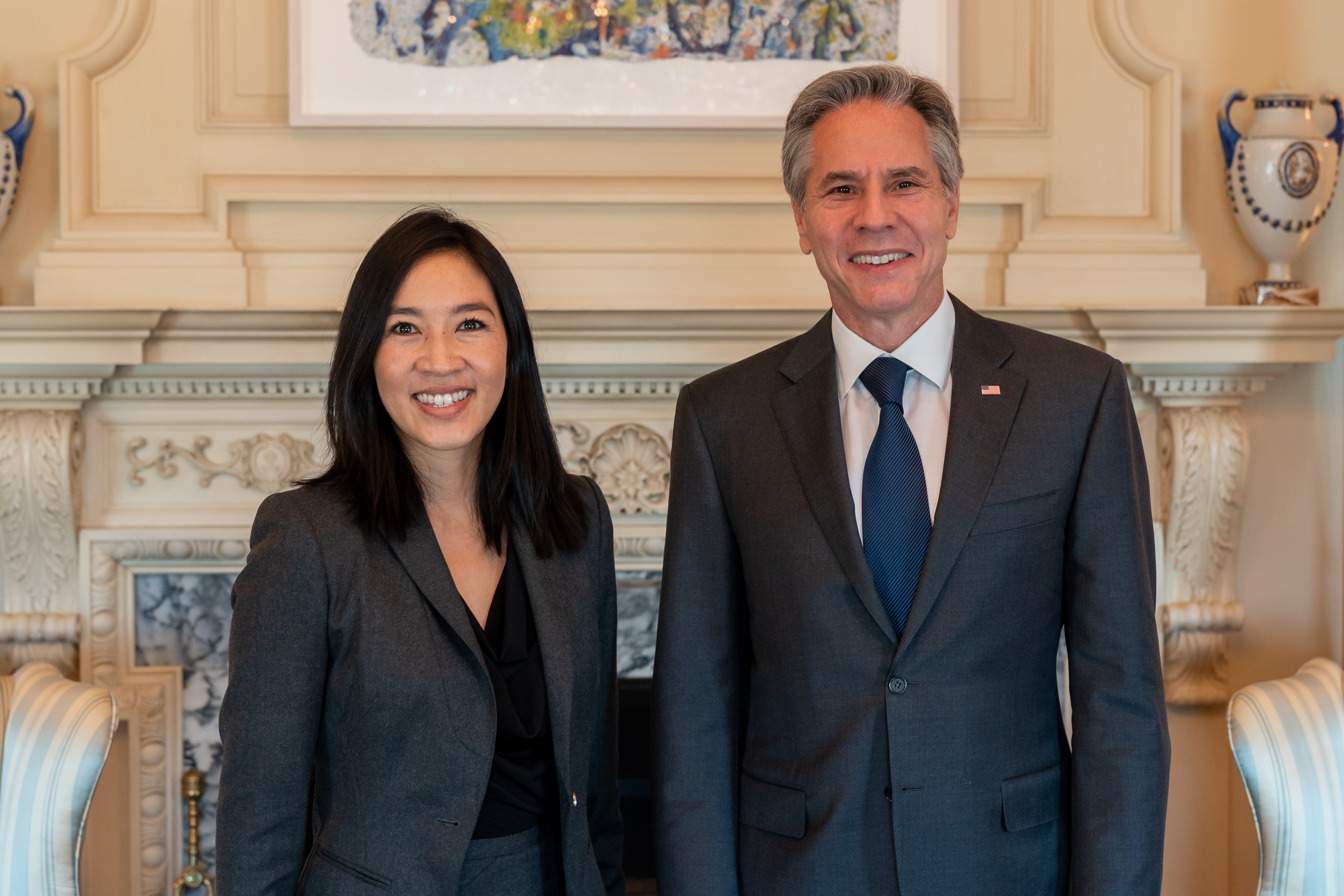
Kwan with US Secretary of State Antony Blinken in 2022

On December 15, 2021, President Joe Biden announced that he intended to nominate Kwan to be United States ambassador to Belize. She was formally nominated on January 7, 2022. Hearings on her nomination were held before the Senate Foreign Relations Committee on May 18, 2022. Her nomination was reported favorably by the committee on June 9, 2022. She was confirmed by the Senate with a voice vote on September 29, 2022. She received her appointment on October 7 and was sworn in on October 10, 2022. She presented her credentials to Governor-General of Belize Dame Froyla Tzalam on December 5, 2022. She is the first Asian American woman to hold the position. She served in that position through the Biden administration, leaving in January 2025.

=== Filmography ===
Kwan has guest-starred as herself in The Simpsons episode "Homer and Ned's Hail Mary Pass" and the Family Guy episode "A Hero Sits Next Door". She has also made guest appearances on Arthur (in the season 6 episode "The Good Sport"), Sabrina the Teenage Witch and various other television series. She provided the voice of a shopkeeper in Disney's direct-to-DVD sequel Mulan II. Kwan also did the voice of a fictionalized version of herself called Michelle Kwanzleberry in the penultimate episode of Wow! Wow! Wubbzy!. In 2005, she and fellow figure skater Brian Boitano appeared as announcers in the film Ice Princess.

In 1998, Kwan struck a deal with Walt Disney Television that led to her starring in 3 prime-time skating specials on ABC: Reflections on Ice in 1998 (an ice skating adaptation of the Disney film Mulan, based on the Chinese legend of Hua Mulan), Michelle Kwan Skates to Disney's Greatest Hits in 1999 and Princess on Ice in 2001, with the last special featuring performances by the boy band O-Town and the country music vocal group SHeDAISY. She also appeared in various other televised skating specials throughout her career.

In 1999, she appeared in the Michelle Kwan Figure Skating computer game (released by Electronic Arts).

=== Other activities ===
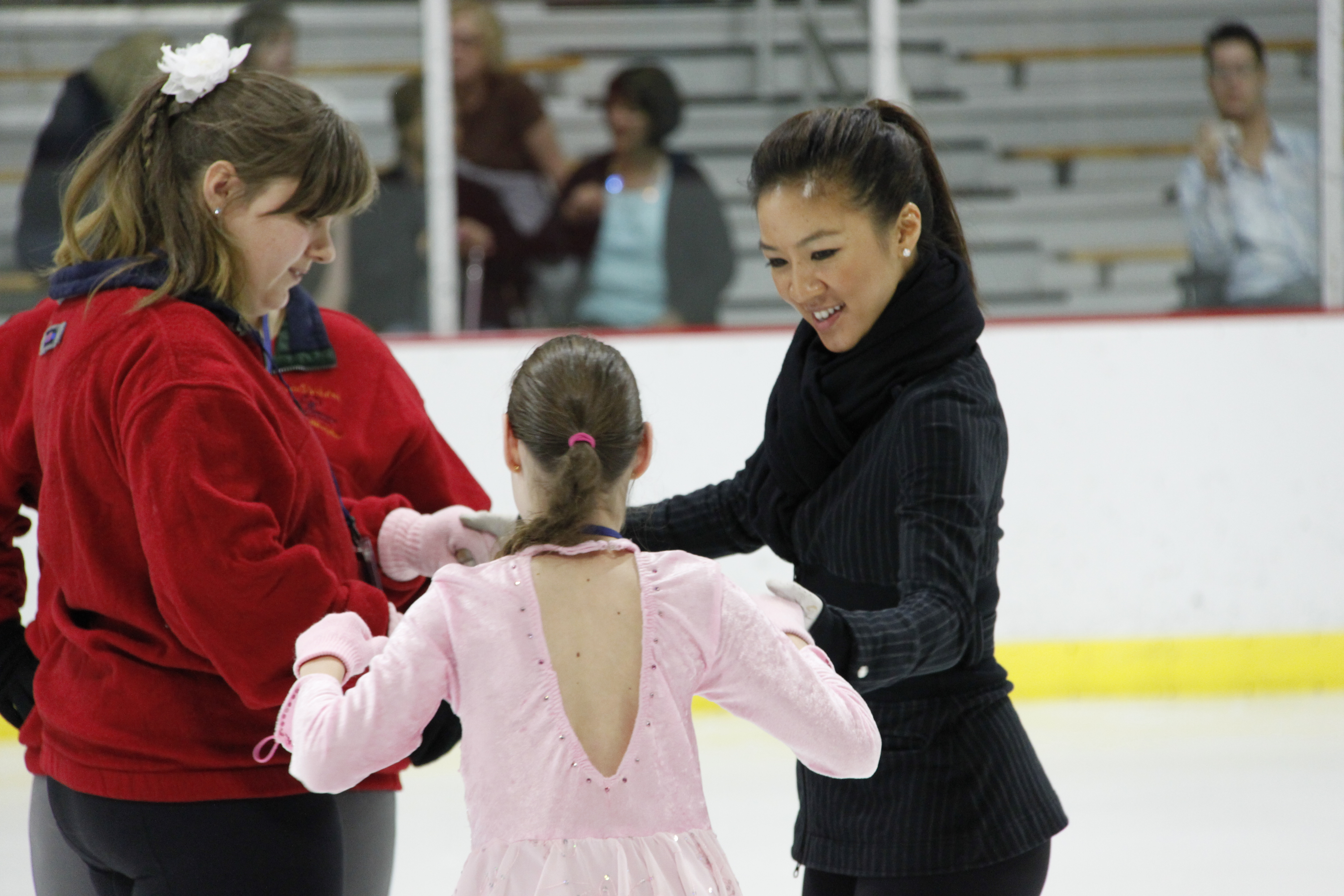
Kwan at the Special Olympics Massachusetts, September 25, 2010

Scholastic published an autobiography by Kwan in 1998, titled Heart of a Champion, which is now in its sixth printing as of 2006.

In 1999, Kwan signed with Disney Publishing Worldwide for an 8-book deal which included an inspirational book for children titled, The Winning Attitude: What it Takes to be a Champion, as well as a series of fictional skating books inspired by Kwan and written by Nola Thacker called "Michelle Kwan presents Skating Dreams".

Kwan voiced the food vendor in Disney's Mulan II which was released in 2004.

In 2005, Kwan's family opened the EastWest Ice Palace in Artesia, California. The ice rink houses many of her skating medals and memorabilia.

In January 2009, Kwan was appointed a member of the President's Council on Physical Fitness and Sports by George W. Bush, a role which she had continued into the Obama administration.

Kwan has been a longtime supporter of the Special Olympics, taking part in "unified sports" events that bring together athletes with and without intellectual disabilities. In 2011, she was added to the board of directors for the Special Olympics.

=== Endorsements ===
Kwan has had many endorsement contracts throughout her career, including Aim Funds, Campbell's, Caress soap, Chevrolet, Coca-Cola, Disney, East West Bank, Got Milk?, Kraft, Mattel, Maxxis, McDonald's, Minute Maid, Riedell Skates, Royal Caribbean International, Starbucks, United Airlines, Visa, and Yoplait.

Kwan's multi-year deal with Chevrolet (starting in 2000) was estimated to be worth over $1 million. The Chevrolet/Michelle Kwan R.E.W.A.R.D.S. Scholarship program was established by the Chevrolet Motor Division of General Motors in cooperation with Kwan.

In 2002, Kwan was named a "celebrity representative" and spokeswoman for The Walt Disney Company in a three-year deal reported to be worth $1 million a year. This deal was renewed and expanded in 2006.

== Personal life ==
=== Marriage ===
In September 2012, Kwan announced her engagement to Clay Pell, an American lawyer, military officer and former director for strategic planning on the National Security staff at the White House. Pell is the grandson of the late Rhode Island Senator Claiborne Pell. The couple, who met in April 2011, were married on January 19, 2013, in Providence, Rhode Island. Vera Wang designed Kwan's wedding gown.

In February 2014, Pell declared his candidacy for Governor of Rhode Island. He finished third in the primary.

After four years of marriage, in March 2017, Pell filed for divorce from Kwan in California, citing irreconcilable differences. Subsequently, Kwan filed for divorce in Rhode Island.

=== Children ===
On January 5, 2022, Kwan announced the birth of her first child, a daughter. On December 11, 2025, Kwan announced the birth of her second child, a daughter, on her Instagram page. Kwan has not announced the father of her daughters.

== Political views and activism ==
=== 2016 presidential election ===
Kwan worked as a surrogate to Hillary Clinton's 2016 presidential campaign as an outreach coordinator. When asked why she decided to join the campaign she explained, "There was no way that I could sit on the sidelines."

She added that, for her, supporting Clinton was a no-brainer, given her family's own immigrant history. "Every day I'm reminded about my personal story, about what's at stake in these elections. I think of my parents, and as I look around the room, we probably share similar stories, of how our parents, grandparents, or great-grandparents might have immigrated to the U.S. It's so the next generation of Americans have the ability to dream that dream."

=== Recipe for Change (2021) ===
In May 2021, it was announced that Kwan would executive produce "Recipe for Change" for YouTube alongside LeBron James, Maverick Carter, Dennis Cheng, Jamal Henderson and Philip Byron. The special, produced by the SpringHill Company, brings together Asian American celebrities, chefs, activists, and creators to celebrate Asian and Pacific Islanders culture and discuss the recent and historic acts of hate and violence against the Asian Americans and Pacific Islanders community. "Recipe for Change" was nominated for "Outstanding Daytime Special" at the 49th Daytime Creative Arts & Lifestyle Emmy Awards.

== Programs ==
Season	Short program	Free skating	Exhibition
2005–2006	Totentanz by Franz Liszt arranged by Maksim Mrvica choreo. by Tatiana Tarasova	Prelude in C-sharp minor by Sergei Rachmaninoff choreo. by Tatiana Tarasova	A Song for You by Natalie Cole
2004–2005	Adagio from Spartacus by Aram Khachaturian choreo. by Nikolai Morozov	Boléro by Maurice Ravel choreo. by Christopher Dean	You Raise Me Up by Josh Groban; This Used to Be My Playground by Madonna
2003–2004	The Feeling Begins (from The Last Temptation of Christ) by Peter Gabriel choreo. by Scott Williams, Michelle Kwan, Karen Kwan and Nikolai Morozov	Tosca by Giacomo Puccini choreo. by Nikolai Morozov	Fallin' by Alicia Keys; Boléro by Maurice Ravel choreo. by Christopher Dean
2002–2003	The Feeling Begins (from The Last Temptation of Christ) by Peter Gabriel choreo. by Scott Williams, Michelle Kwan, Karen Kwan and Nikolai Morozov	Concierto de Aranjuez by Joaquín Rodrigo performed by Ikuko Kawai choreo. by Scott Williams, Michelle Kwan, Karen Kwan, and Nikolai Morozov; The Miraculous Mandarin by Béla Bartók choreo. by Peter Oppegard	Fields of Gold by Eva Cassidy
2001–2002	Piano Concerto No. 3; Piano Trio No. 2 by Sergei Rachmaninoff choreo. by Lori Nichol; East of Eden by Lee Holdridge choreo. by Lori Nichol	Scheherazade by Nikolai Rimsky-Korsakov performed by New York Philharmonic choreo. by Sarah Kawahara; The Miraculous Mandarin by Béla Bartók choreo. by Peter Oppegard	Fields of Gold by Eva Cassidy
2000–2001	East of Eden by Lee Holdridge choreo. by Lori Nichol; Rush by Eric Clapton choreo. by Christopher Dean	O canto do cisne negro (Song of the Black Swan) by Heitor Villa-Lobos; Dumky trio by Antonín Dvořák choreo. by Lori Nichol	Beautiful World by Sumi Jo; This Time Around by Linda Eder
1999–2000	A Day in the Life by John Lennon, Paul McCartney performed by Jeff Beck choreo. by Lori Nichol	The Red Violin by John Corigliano performed by Joshua Bell choreo. by Lori Nichol	The World Is Not Enough by Garbage; Hands (from Joy: A Holiday Collection) by Jewel; One More Time from Message in a Bottle by Laura Pausini
1998–1999	Carmen Suite by Rodion Shchedrin; Carmen Fantasie by Franz Waxman; Carmen by Paco de Lucía choreo. by Lori Nichol	Ariane; Orchestral Suite No. 3; Orchestral Suite No. 6 by Jules Massenet; Absalom's Death And Tango by Leonid Desyatnikov performed by Gidon Kremer choreo. by Lori Nichol	Kissing You by Des'ree; East of Eden by Lee Holdridge choreo. by Lori Nichol; Carmen Suite by Rodion Shchedrin; Carmen Fantasie by Franz Waxman; Carmen by Paco de Lucía choreo. by Lori Nichol
1997–1998	Piano Concerto No. 3; Piano Trio No. 2 by Sergei Rachmaninoff choreo. by Lori Nichol	Lyra Angelica by William Alwyn; Gymnopedie #3 by Erik Satie choreo. by Lori Nichol	On My Own (from Les Misérables) performed by Kaho Shimada; Dante's Prayer by Loreena McKennitt
1996–1997	Orchestral Suite No. 3; Finale from Hérodiade by Jules Massenet; The Red Poppy by Reinhold Gliere choreo. by Lori Nichol	Gyulistan Bayati Shiraz by Fikret Amirov; Lion of the Desert by Maurice Jarre choreo. by Lori Nichol	Winter by Tori Amos choreo. by Michelle Kwan
1995–1996	Romanza by Salvador Bacarisse; Fiesta Flamenca by Monty Kelly choreo. by Lori Nichol	Salome; Dance of the Seven Veils by Richard Strauss choreo. by Lori Nichol	East of Eden by Lee Holdridge; Just Around the Riverbend (from Pocahontas) by Judy Kuhn choreo. by Lori Nichol
1994–1995	Yellow River Piano Concerto by Xian Xinghai performed by Yin Chengzong, Chu Wanghua	Introduction and Rondo Capriccioso by Camille Saint-Saëns choreo. by Lori Nichol	Fantasia on Greensleeves by Ralph Vaughan Williams; East of Eden by Lee Holdridge
1993–1994	Song of India (from Sadko by Nikolai Rimsky-Korsakov) choreo. by Lori Nichol (also "Sabre Dance" by Aram Khachaturian)	East of Eden by Lee Holdridge	
1992–1993		Miss Saigon by Claude-Michel Schönberg	
1991–1992		Concerto in F by George Gershwin	

== Competitive highlights ==
Major events for Olympic-eligible skaters include the World Figure Skating Championships, the Olympic Winter Games, the ISU Grand Prix of Figure Skating, and for American skaters, the U.S. Championships. Kwan's record in these events is listed by season in the tables below. Competitive outings.

International
Event	91–92	92–93	93–94	94–95	95–96	96–97	97–98	98–99	99–00	00–01	01–02	02–03	03–04	04–05	05-06
Olympics							2nd				3rd				WD
Worlds			8th	4th	1st	2nd	1st	2nd	1st	1st	2nd	1st	3rd	4th	
GP Final					1st	2nd			2nd	2nd	2nd				
GP Nations Cup					1st										
GP Skate America			7th	2nd	1st	1st	1st		1st	1st	1st	1st			
GP Skate Canada					1st		1st		1st	2nd	3rd				
GP France				3rd		1st									
Goodwill Games			2nd				1st				2nd				
International: Junior
Junior Worlds			1st												
Gardena		1st Jr.													
National
U.S. Champ.	9th J	6th	2nd	2nd	1st	2nd	1st	1st	1st	1st	1st	1st	1st	1st	
GP = Became part of Champions Series in 1995–1996, Grand Prix from 1998 to 1999; J. = Junior level, WD = Withdrew, Alt = Alternate (did not compete)

== Works cited ==
- Kestnbaum, Ellyn (2003). Culture on Ice: Figure Skating and Cultural Meaning. Middletown, Connecticut: Wesleyan University Press. ISBN 0-8195-6641-1.
