= Axel jump =

Jump in figure skating

Figure skating element
- Illustration of a single Axel jump
- Element name: Axel jump
- Alternative name: Axel Paulsen jump
- Scoring abbreviation: A
- Element type: Jump
- Take-off edge: Forward outside
- Landing edge: Backward outside
- Inventor: Axel Paulsen
- Disciplines: Singles, pairs

The Axel jump or Axel Paulsen jump, named after its inventor, Norwegian figure skater Axel Paulsen, is an edge jump performed in figure skating. It is the sport's oldest and most difficult jump, and the only basic jump in competition with a forward take-off, which makes it the easiest to identify. A double or triple Axel is required in both the short program and the free skating segment for junior and senior single skaters in all events sanctioned by the International Skating Union (ISU).

Compared with other basic figure skating jumps, the Axel requires an extra half revolution, which makes a triple Axel "more a quadruple jump than a triple".

The triple Axel has become a common technical element in the men's singles discipline. The quadruple Axel was successfully executed in competition for the first time in 2022 by Ilia Malinin, who remains the only person to have landed it in international competition.

== History ==
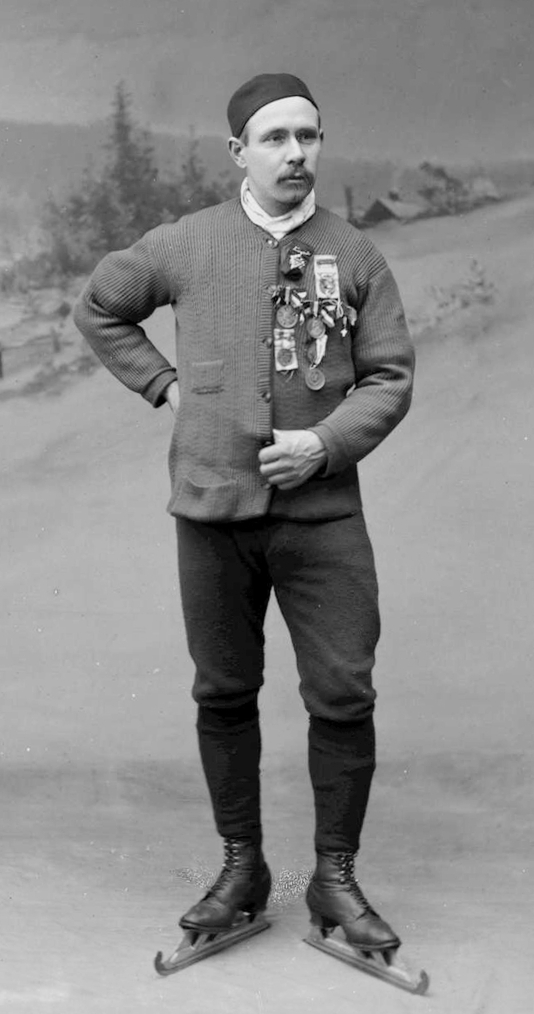
Norwegian figure skater Axel Paulsen, creator of the Axel jump, pictured in 1895

The Axel jump, also called the Axel Paulsen jump for its creator the Norwegian figure skater Axel Paulsen, is an edge jump in the sport of figure skating. According to figure skating historian James Hines, the Axel is "figure skating's most difficult jump". It is the only basic jump in competition that takes off forward, which makes it the easiest jump to identify. Skaters commonly perform a double or triple Axel, followed by a jump of lower difficulty in combination. It is the most studied jump in figure skating.

A double or triple Axel is required in the short program for junior and senior single skaters in all ISU competitions. For the free skating program for junior and senior single skaters, one of the seven required jump elements must be an Axel-type jump. (Note: After the 2026–27 season, six jump elements will be required in the free skating program for both junior and senior single skaters.) In the 2025-2026 season, junior pair skating teams have to include either a double loop solo jump or a double Axel solo jump in their short programs; in 2026–27, they will have to include either a double Lutz solo jump or a double Axel solo jump in their short programs. In competition, the base value of an Axel is determined by the number of revolutions completed during the jump. The base value of a single Axel is 1.10, a double Axel 3.30, a triple Axel 8.00, a quadruple Axel 12.50.

Paulsen was the first skater to accomplish an Axel, at the first international figure skating competition, which was held in Vienna in 1882, while wearing speed skates. Hines, who called Paulsen "progressive" for inventing it, stated that he did it "as a special figure". By the mid-1920s, the Axel was the only jump that was not being doubled. Dorothy Greenhough-Smith was the first woman to complete an Axel in competition, which she did at the 1908 Olympic Games; fellow skater TD Richardson said that she performed the jump with "complete nonchalance" while wearing an ankle-length skirt. The ISU, however, states that Sonja Henie from Norway was the first woman to complete an Axel in competition, in the 1920s.

Professional German skater Charlotte Oelschlägel was also one of the first women to include an Axel in her programs; Hines reported that she would terminate the Axel with her "famous fade-away ending", the Charlotte spiral, a move she invented. It was also reported by Hines that in the 1930s, Austrian skater Felix Kaspar, who was known for his athleticism, performed Axels with a trajectory of four feet height and 20 feet distance from take-off to landing (1.20 m height and 6 m distance); Hines stated that "there is little doubt in the minds of those who saw him that had the technique then been known, he probably could have easily performed triple or even quadruple jumps".

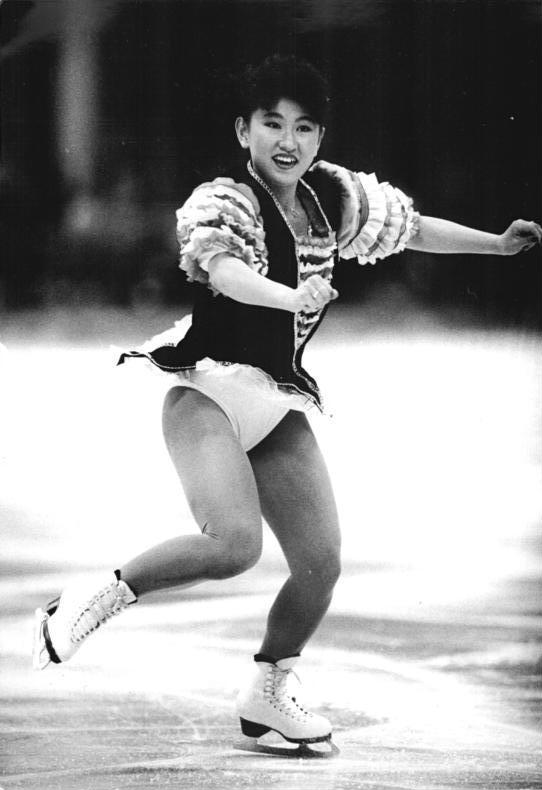
Japanese figure skater Midori Ito, first female skater to land a triple Axel

At the 1948 Winter Olympics, American Dick Button was the first skater to complete a double Axel in competition. American Carol Heiss was the first woman to perform a double Axel, in 1953. The first successful triple Axel in competition was performed by Canadian Vern Taylor at the 1978 World Championships. Six years later, at the 1984 Winter Games in Sarajevo, Canadian skater Brian Orser became the first skater to complete a triple Axel at the Olympics. The first female skater to successfully execute a triple Axel in competition was Japanese skater Midori Ito, at a regional competition in the Aichi Prefecture of Japan in 1988. She was also the first woman to land it at an international competition, at the 1988 NHK Trophy, as well as the first woman to land it at the Olympics, in 1992.

The first throw triple Axel was performed by American pair skaters Rena Inoue and John Baldwin, at the 2006 U.S. National Championships. They were also the first couple to perform a throw triple Axel at the Olympics and international competition in 2006.

In 2022, at the CS U.S. Classic, American skater Ilia Malinin was the first skater to successfully complete a quadruple Axel in competition.

List of first performed Axel jumps in international competition
Abbr.	Jump element	Skater	Nation	Event	Ref.
1A	Single Axel (men's)	Axel Paulsen	Norway	1882 international skating competition in Vienna	
1A	Single Axel (women's)	Sonja Henie	Norway	1920s skating competition	
2A	Double Axel (men's)	Dick Button	United States	1948 Winter Olympic Games	
2A	Double Axel (women's)	Carol Heiss	United States	1953 skating competition	
3A	Triple Axel (men's)	Vern Taylor	Canada	1978 World Championships	
3A	Triple Axel (women's)	Midori Ito	Japan	1988 NHK Trophy	
4A	Quadruple Axel (men's)	Ilia Malinin	United States	2022 CS U.S. Classic	
4A	Quadruple Axel (women's)	None ratified			

== Execution ==
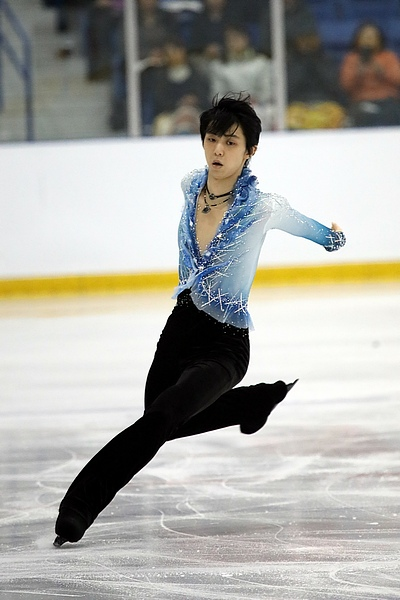
Yuzuru Hanyu sets up for an Axel jump

The Axel is an edge jump, which means that the skater must spring into the air from bent knees. It is the oldest figure skating jump; it is also the most difficult because unlike all other jumps, which is initiated with a backwards take off, the Axel has a facing forward take off and a backwards landing. A "lead-up" to the Axel is the waltz jump, a half-revolution jump and the first jump that skaters learn.

The Axel has three phases: the entrance phase (which ends with the takeoff), the flight phase, when the skater rotates into the air, and the landing phase, which begins when the skater's blade hits the ice and ends when they are "safely skating backwards on the full outside edge with one leg behind in the air". According to researcher Anna Mazurkiewicz and her colleagues, the most important parts of the entrance phase are the transition phase (also called the pre-takeoff phase) and the takeoff itself.

Jason Brown performing a triple Axel jump (real-time and slow motion)

The jump has a forward takeoff, typically from a step forward onto the outside edge of the takeoff foot. The skater then kicks through with their free leg, helping them to jump into the air. The skater must land on the back outside edge of the opposite foot. The change in foot required to complete the Axel means that their center of gravity must be transferred from the left side to the right, while rotating in the air, to reach the correct position for landing. As a result, the Axel has an extra half-rotation, which, as figure skating expert Hannah Robbins states, "makes a triple Axel more a quadruple jump than a triple". The single Axel consists of one-and-a-half revolutions, the double Axel consists of two-and-a-half revolutions, the triple Axel consists of three-and-a-half revolutions, and the quad Axel consists of four-and-a-half revolutions. No skater, as of 2025, has landed a quintuple Axel in competition.

Amber Glenn performing a triple Axel jump

Sports reporter Nora Princiotti states, about the triple Axel, "It takes incredible strength and body control for a skater to get enough height and to get into the jump fast enough to complete all the rotations before landing with a strong enough base to absorb the force generated". According to American skater Mirai Nagasu, "falling on the triple Axel is really brutal". On a successful quadruple Axel, the skater lands with five to ten times the force of their body weight. According to Mexican skater Donovan Carrillo, accomplishing the quad Axel is "an incredible feat" because a skater must start the jump from one foot, complete four-and-a-half rotations in less than one second, and then land on the opposite foot.

More skilled skaters have greater takeoff velocities and jump lengths, so when skaters perform double Axels, they exhibit greater rotations during the flight phase, take off in more closed positions, and attain greater rotational velocities than when performing single Axels. They also increase their turns not by increasing the time in the air, but by increasing their rotational velocity when performing single, double, and triple Axels. According to researcher D.L. King, the key to executing a successful triple Axel is "achieving a high rotational velocity by generating angular momentum at take-off and minimizing the moment of inertia about the spin axis".

=== Gallery ===
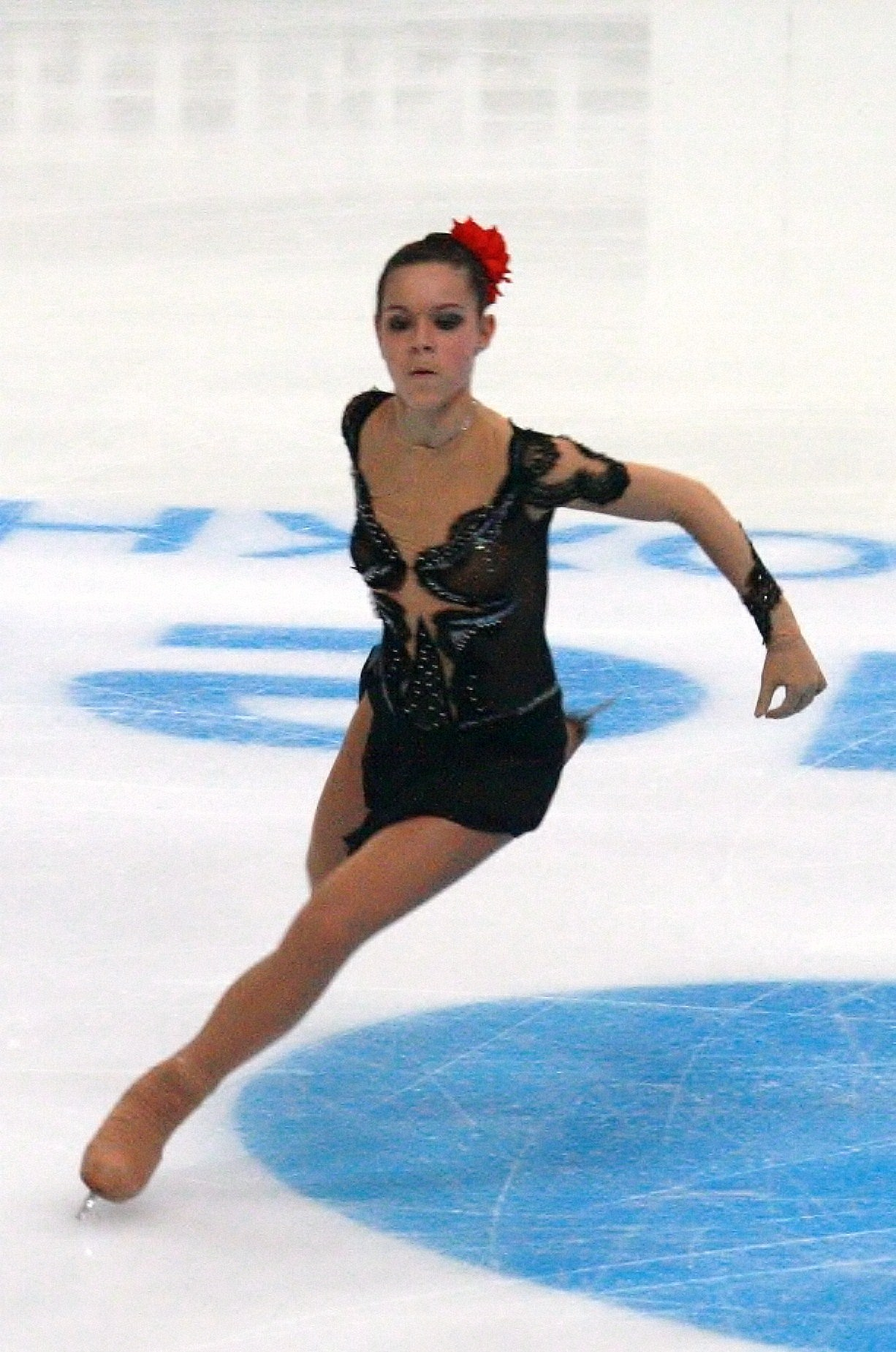
Adelina Sotnikova sets up for an Axel jump

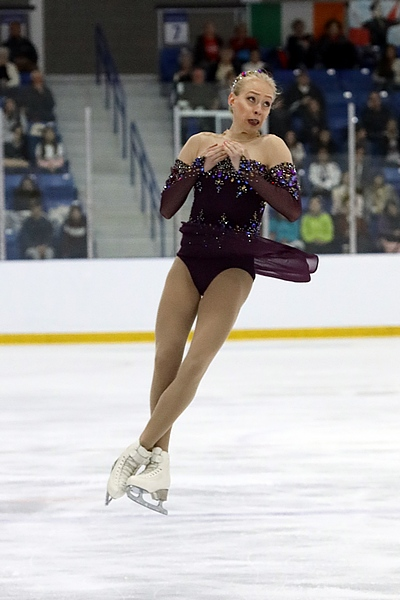
Bradie Tennell rotates in the air

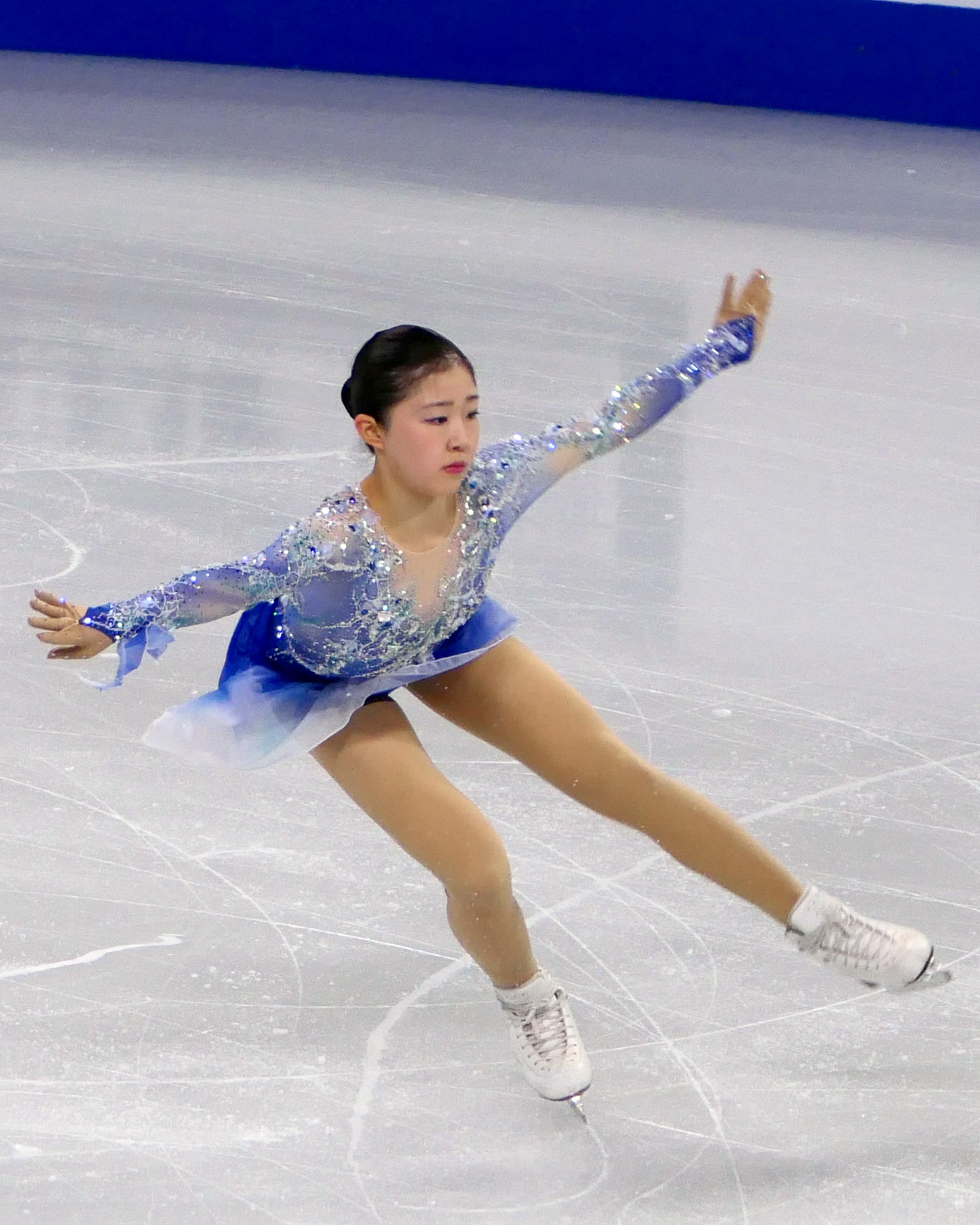
Mone Chiba landing

Lara Naki Gutmann performing a triple toe loop jump – double Axel jump sequence (real-time and slow motion)

== Works cited ==
- Hines, James R. (2006). Figure Skating: A History. Urbana, Illinois: University of Illinois Press. ISBN 978-0252072864.
- Hines, James R. (2011). Historical Dictionary of Figure Skating. Lanham, Maryland: Scarecrow Press. ISBN 978-0810868595.
- Hines, James R. (2015). Figure Skating in the Formative Years: Singles, Pairs, and the Expanding Role of Women. Urbana, Illinois: University of Illinois Press. ISBN 978-0252039065.
- "ISU Figure Skating Media Guide 2025/26" (PDF). Lausanne, Switzerland: International Skating Union. 21 August 2025. Archived (PDF) from the original on 14 September 2025.
- Kestnbaum, Ellyn (2003). Culture on Ice: Figure Skating and Cultural Meaning. Middletown, Connecticut: Wesleyan University Press. ISBN 978-0819566423.
- Mazurkiewicz, Anna; Iwańska, Dagmara; Urbanik, Czesław (27 July 2018). "Biomechanics of the Axel Paulsen Figure Skating Jump". Polish Journal of Sport and Tourism. 25 (2). Warsaw: 3–9. doi:10.2478/pjst-2018-0007.
- Petkevich, John Misha (1989). Figure Skating: Championship Techniques. New York: Penguin Books. ISBN 978-0452262096.
- "Special Regulations & Technical Rules – Single & Pair Skating and Ice Dance 2024" (PDF). International Skating Union. June 2024. Archived (PDF) from the original on 9 November 2024.
