= Death spiral (figure skating) =

Circular skating move in which the male lowers his partner to the ice

Figure skating element
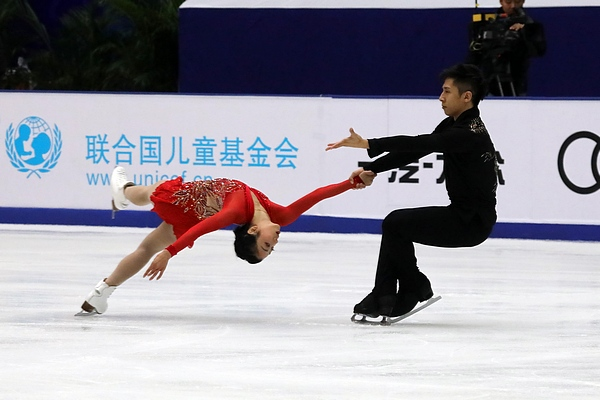
- Element name: Death spiral
- Scoring abbreviation: Ds
- Disciplines: Pair skating

The death spiral is a circular move in figure skating involving two partners in the discipline of pair skating, in which the male partner lowers the female partner while she arches backward towards the ice while gliding on one foot and as she holds his hand "while he rotates her in a circle with her head almost touching the ice surface". It was created by German professional skater Charlotte Oelschlägel and her husband Curt Neumann in the 1920s. Suzanne Morrow and Wallace Diestelmeyer from Canada were the first pair team to perform the death spiral one-handed (the man holding the woman in position with one hand), at the 1948 Olympic Games.

There are four types of death spirals: the backward outside, the forward inside, the backward inside, and the forward outside. The forward inside death spiral is the easiest death spiral, and the forward outside death spiral is the most difficult. The International Skating Union (ISU), the governing body that oversees figure skating, describes the requirements pair skating teams must follow when executing death spirals, and allows for variations of arm holds and pivot positions.

== Types ==
Senior pair skating teams must perform different types of death spirals in their short programs and free skating programs. The opposite handhold of the man is not allowed in the short program, but is allowed in the free skate. The opposite handhold of the woman is allowed during both the short program and free skate, but does not increase the difficulty of the death spiral. Change in both the man's and woman's arm holds is allowed at any time during both the short program and free skate.

There are four types of death spirals: the forward inside death spiral, the backward outside death spiral, the backward inside death spiral, and the forward outside death spiral. The forward inside death spiral is accomplished when the man skates on a backward outside edge and the woman skates on a forward inside edge. He performs a pivot while holding her hand with the same fully extended arm as his skating foot, while she leans sideways and circles around him, with her arms also fully extended. According to Skate Canada, the forward inside death spiral is the easiest death spiral.

The backward outside death spiral is executed when both partners skate on a backward outside edge. The man must hold the woman's hand with the same arm as his fully extended skating foot while performing a pivot, and she leans backward as she circles around him while her arm is fully extended. According to Skate Canada, the forward outside death spiral is the most difficult death spiral. For both forward inside and backward outside death spirals, the man can skate in any position, edge, or direction, but he must remain in the prescribed pivot position, and his partner must circle around him on the prescribed edge.

The backward inside death spiral is executed when the woman leans towards the ice while her arm is fully extended and she circles around the man on a "firm backward inside edge". The forward outside death spiral is performed like the backward inside death spiral; the only difference is that the woman circles around her partner on a "firm forward outside edge".

== Execution ==
While the woman performs "the actual death spiral" in the team's final position, both she and her partner must complete at least one revolution, with the man's knees "clearly bent and in full pivot position". Judges begin to count revolutions when both partners "are in the actual low death spiral position". Revolutions begin when the toe the man uses to anchor onto the ice is stationary, which is necessary due to centripetal acceleration experienced during the revolutions, and end when the woman either rises to exit the death spiral or when the man's pivot ends.

Pair skating teams must execute the prescribed types of death spirals only. Death spirals are worth more points when both partners stays in a low pivot position. The man's low position occurs when the lower part of his buttocks is not higher than the upper part of the knee of his pivot foot. The woman's low position for inside death spirals occurs when the lowest buttock and hip or head is not higher than her skating knee; for outside death spirals, it occurs when her head is not higher than he skating knee. Her head and body are as close to the ice surface as possible, without her head touching the ice, or without using her free hand or any part of her body to assist herself. Her body weight is supported by her partner's hold and by the force of the spiraling edge. One of the woman's skates must remain on the ice throughout the death spiral.

The man must be in a centered position and use a fully extended arm. Any kind of position if the pair team's hold lasts for at least one revolution can be counted. Pair skaters earn a higher level of difficulty, and thus more points, for difficult entries immediately before the death spiral or for difficult exits. Entry into a death spiral starts "at the beginning of the entry curve when one partner is on one foot on the edge of the death spiral and the other partner is also on one foot or in a position such as spread eagle, shoot the duck etc." The exit begins when the man begins to bend his holding arm at the elbow and ends when the woman's position is vertical. Both partners must execute positions "that affect the main body core and balance" when performing difficult entries and exits. Difficult entry positions must be performed while both partners are executing the entry curve, and either the man or the woman is moving from a difficult entry position to the death spiral, with no delay. Difficult exit positions can include commencing a lift immediately after the death spiral or performing a jump. It must also have "a significant impact on the balance, control and execution of the death spiral". An example of a difficult exit is when the woman exits out of the death spiral immediately and with continuous flow into a dance lift or other type of lift, or into a jump.

== Gallery ==
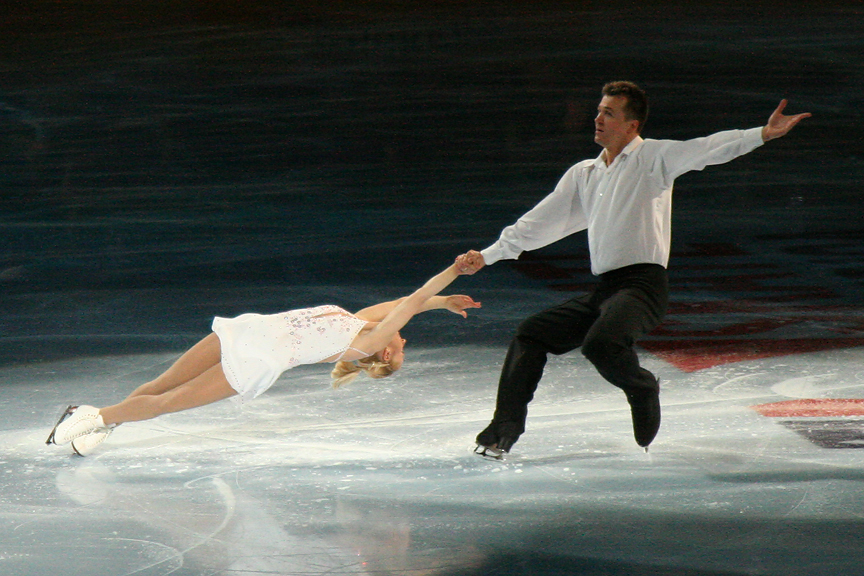
Forward inside death spiral
(Dorota Siudek & Mariusz Siudek)

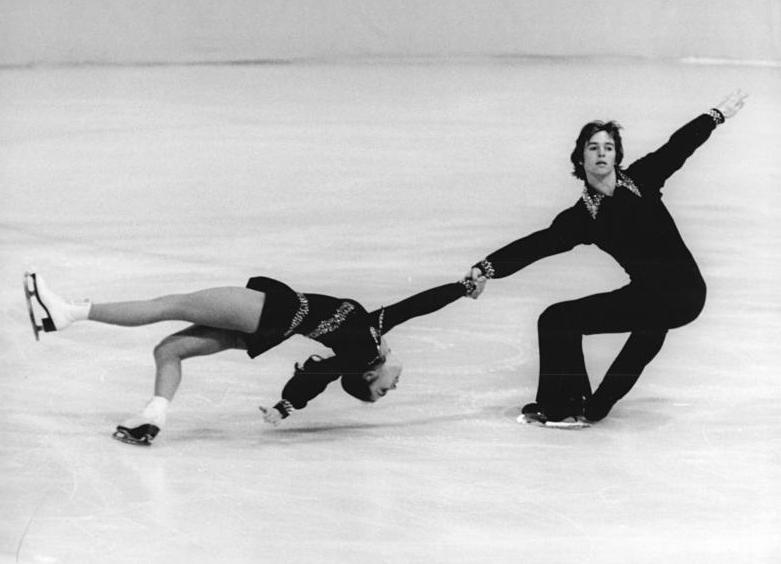
Backward outside death spiral
(Romy Kermer & Rolf Oesterreich)

Backward inside death spiral
(Keauna McLaughlin & Rockne Brubaker)

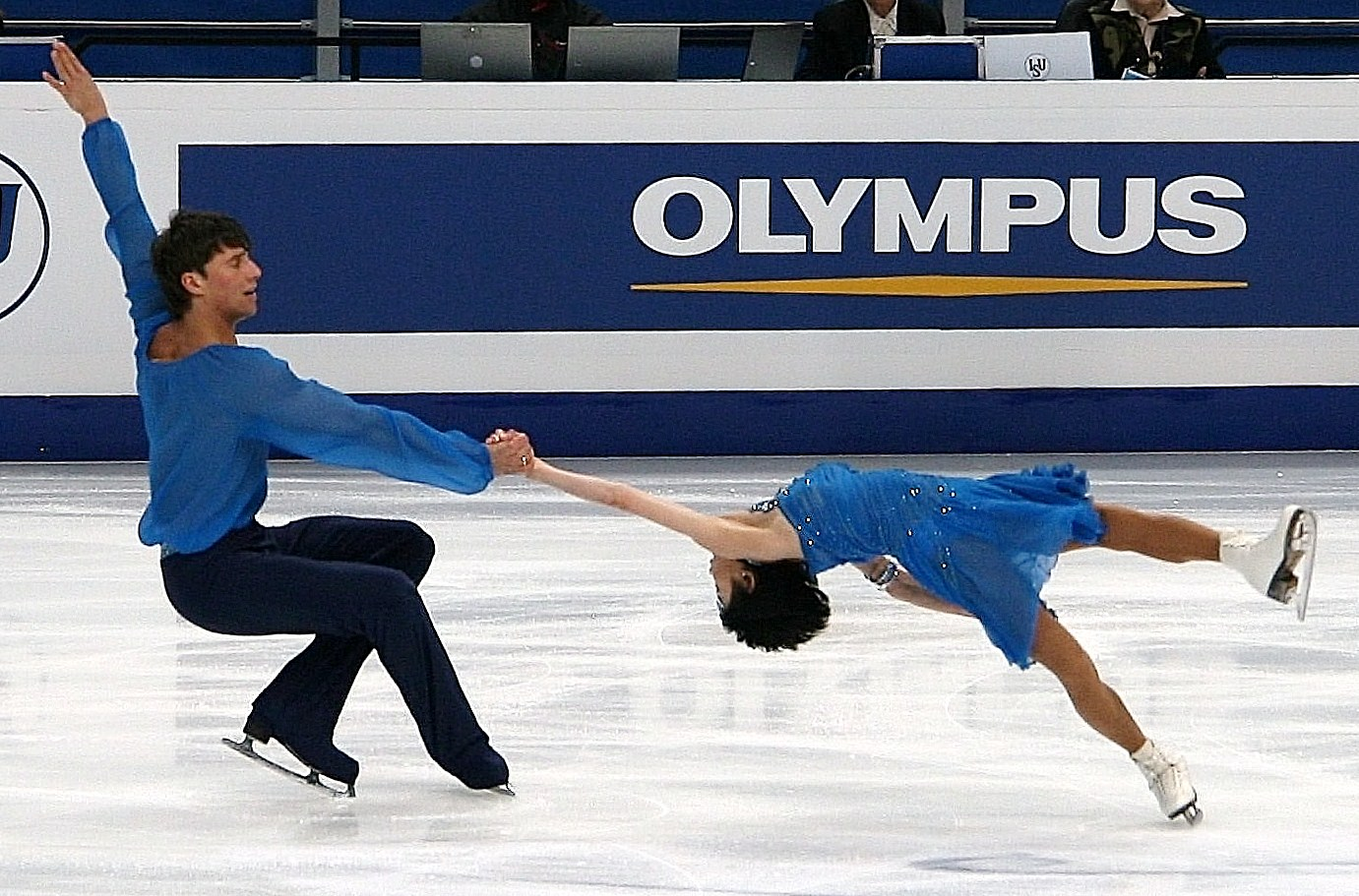
Forward outside death spiral
(Yuko Kavaguti & Alexander Smirnov)

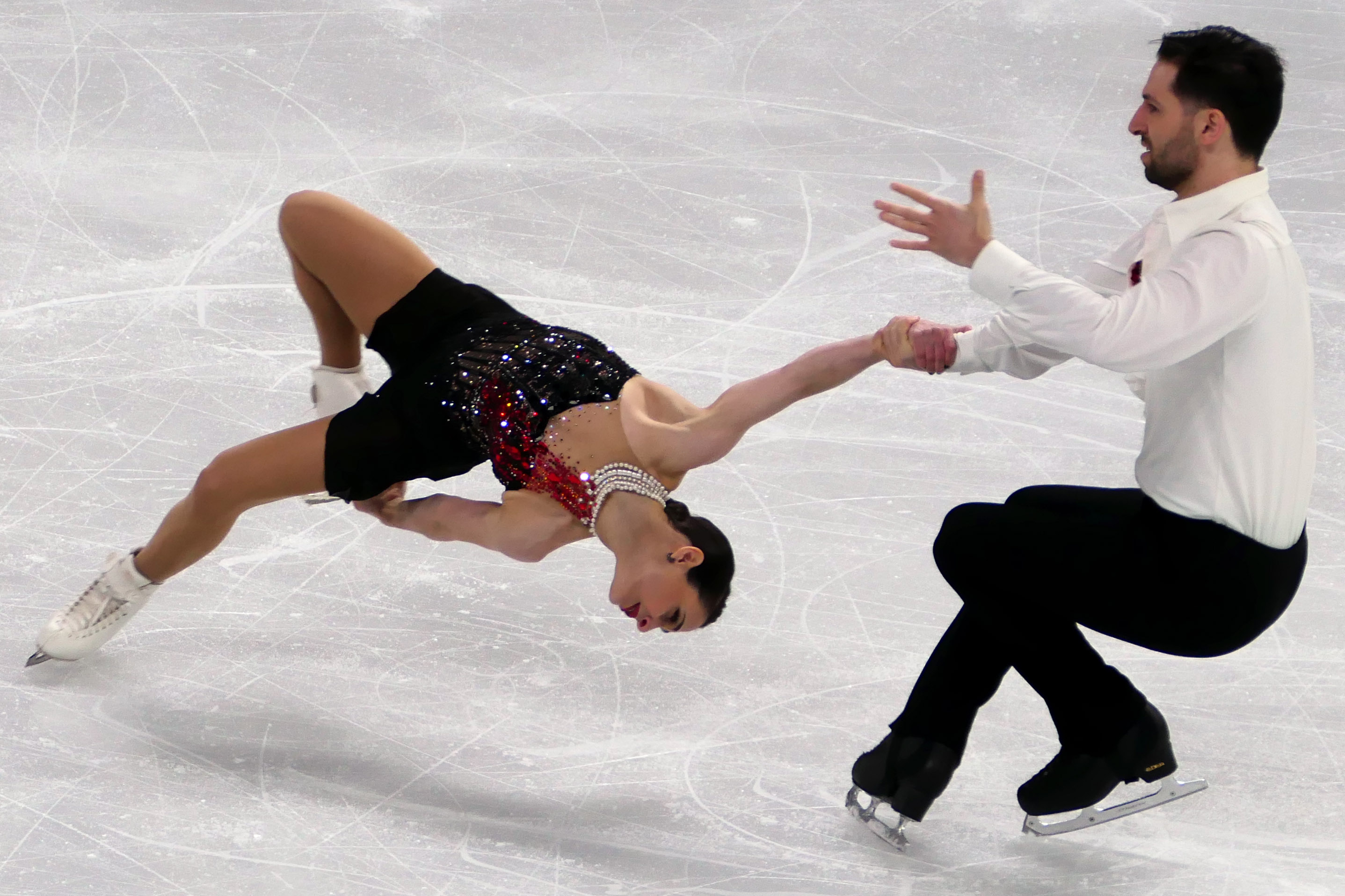
Woman with catch-foot position during forward outside death spiral
(Deanna Stellato-Dudek & Maxime Deschamps)

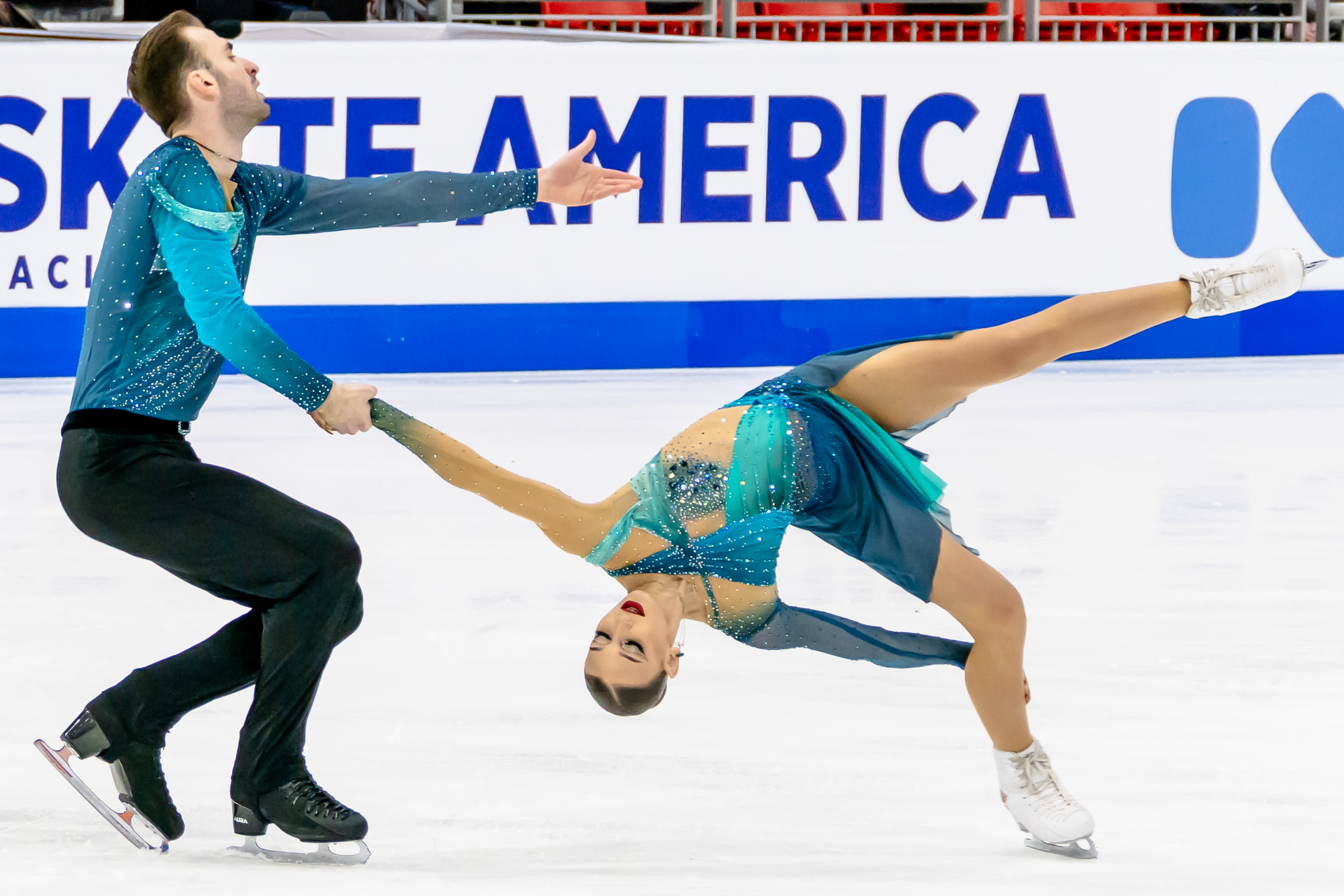
Leg-hold variation of backward outside death spiral
(Anastasiia Metelkina & Luka Berulava)

Video of Ellie Kam and Daniel O'Shea performing a back inside death spiral

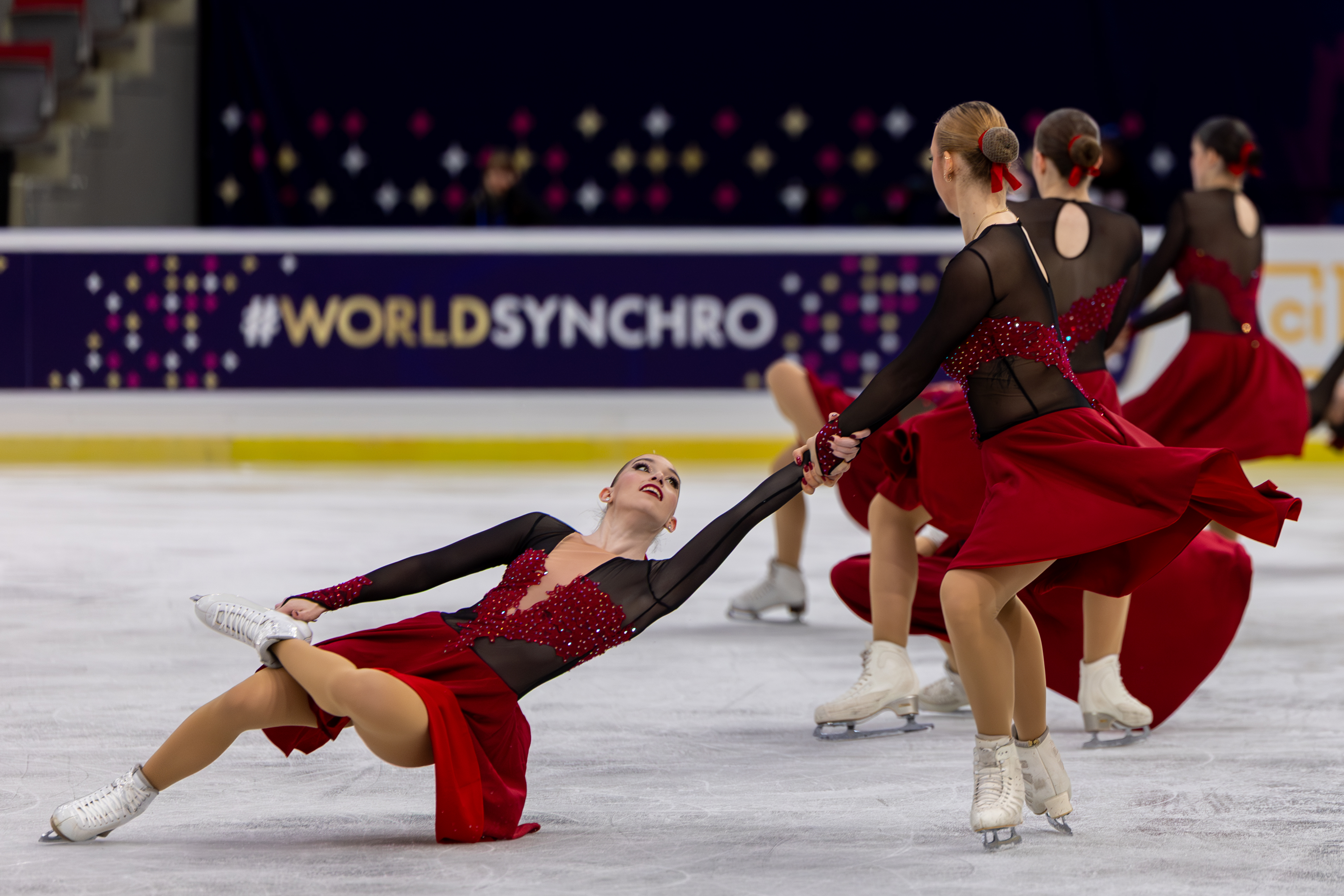
Synchronized skating

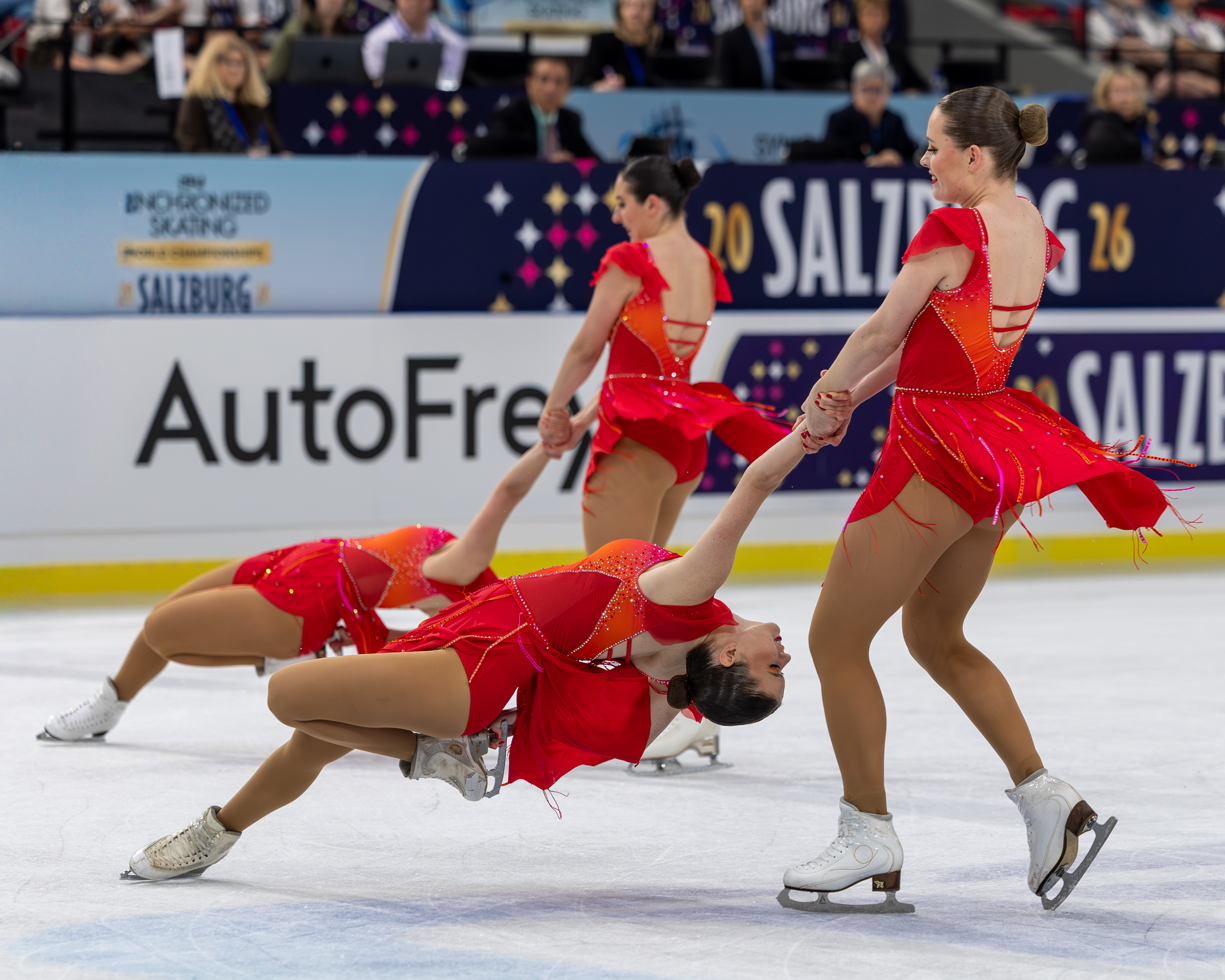
Synchronized skating

== Works cited ==
- "Special Regulations & Technical Rules – Single & Pair Skating and Ice Dance 2024" (PDF). International Skating Union. June 2024. Archived (PDF) from the original on 9 November 2024.
- "Technical Panel Handbook: Pair Skating 2025-2026" (PDF). International Skating Union. 25 July 2025. Archived (PDF) from the original on 14 December 2025.
