= A Hero Sits Next Door =

- Family Guy episode
- Episode no.: Season 1 Episode 5
- Directed by: Monte Young
- Written by: Matt Weitzman; Michael Barker
- Production code: 1ACX05
- Original air date: May 2, 1999

Guest appearances
- Michelle Kwan as herself; Suzie Plakson as various characters; Wally Wingert as The Grinch/various characters; Carlos Alazraqui as Mr. Weed; Butch Hartman as various characters

Episode chronology
← Previous "Mind Over Murder"	Next → "The Son Also Draws"
- Family Guy season 1

"A Hero Sits Next Door" is the fifth episode in the first season of the American animated television series Family Guy. It originally aired on the Fox network in the United States on May 2, 1999. The episode features the introduction of Joe Swanson, who would become a main character in the series. Peter Griffin must find a replacement player for an upcoming softball game. Peter eventually convinces Joe to play for the team after learning that he played baseball in college. When Joe shows up the following morning, Peter realizes that Joe is in a wheelchair. Joe turns out to be a great player, and the team wins the game. Peter becomes jealous of Joe and tries to become a hero. In a subplot, Meg Griffin tries to get Joe's son Kevin to notice her.

"A Hero Sits Next Door" was directed by Monte Young and written by the writing team of Mike Barker and Matt Weitzman. It featured guest performances by actress Suzie Plakson, figure skater Michelle Kwan, as well as actors Wally Wingert and Carlos Alazraqui. Much of the episode features a cutaway style of humor that is typically used in Family Guy, many of which feature cultural references and include Super Friends, Pez, Teletubbies, and the assassinations of John F. Kennedy and Robert F. Kennedy.

The episode received praise from television critics, who considered it to be a memorable introduction for the character of Joe Swanson; certain critics praised the fight sequence between Joe and the Grinch, while others criticized the episode's cutaway gags as well as its plot twists, which they regarded as "odd" and "counter-intuitive".

== Plot summary ==
At the Happy-Go-Lucky Toy Factory, safety inspector Peter Griffin is working when his boss Mr. Weed introduces Guillermo, a ringer who will attempt to assist the company in winning the annual softball game. At home, Peter's wife Lois informs him of their new neighbors, the Swanson family, and wishes for him to make friends with them; however, Peter is not interested and leaves with Brian for softball practice. The regular pitcher is absent, so Peter fills in. He injures Guillermo with a wild pitch during practice and must find a new player to replace him or else he will be fired.

Meanwhile, Lois goes with her youngest son, Stewie, to meet the new neighbors. She is greeted by Bonnie Swanson and soon after meets her husband, Joe, while Meg falls in love with Joe and Bonnie's son, Kevin. When Peter comes home he is rude to the Swansons. Later that night, Peter thinks about who can replace Guillermo, and Lois, hearing her husband's dilemma, reveals that Bonnie told her that Joe played baseball in college. Hearing this, Peter goes to Joe and apologizes for his earlier behavior towards him, and convinces him to play on his company softball team. However, while Peter and Mr. Weed are waiting for Joe at the ballpark, they're horrified when Joe shows up in a wheelchair, as Peter did not notice that Joe is paraplegic. Despite this, Joe proves to be an excellent ballplayer and leads Peter's company's team to victory. That night, Joe has a celebratory party in his house, where he reveals that he is a police officer who was crippled after fighting the Grinch on the roof of an orphanage (Note: Via retcon, this story is later revealed to be a lie in the season 11 episode "Joe's Revenge".) and soon becomes very popular with the neighbors, including Peter's family.

Joe's popularity makes Peter jealous, so Peter wants to be a hero too. He attempts to stop a bank robbery to compete with Joe's heroism. Peter and Brian are taken hostage in the process, but Joe convinces the robbers to surrender, and Meg learns how to get Kevin to notice her in the process. An applauding crowd hoists Joe away in praise, leaving his wheel chair empty. Stewie tries to unlock the "power of the wheelchair," but Lois manages to remove him and puts a pacifier in his mouth, so he quickly falls asleep. After the hostage situation, Peter is disappointed, but his family consoles him by telling him that, even though he can't compare to Joe's regular heroics, he is their hero.

== Production ==
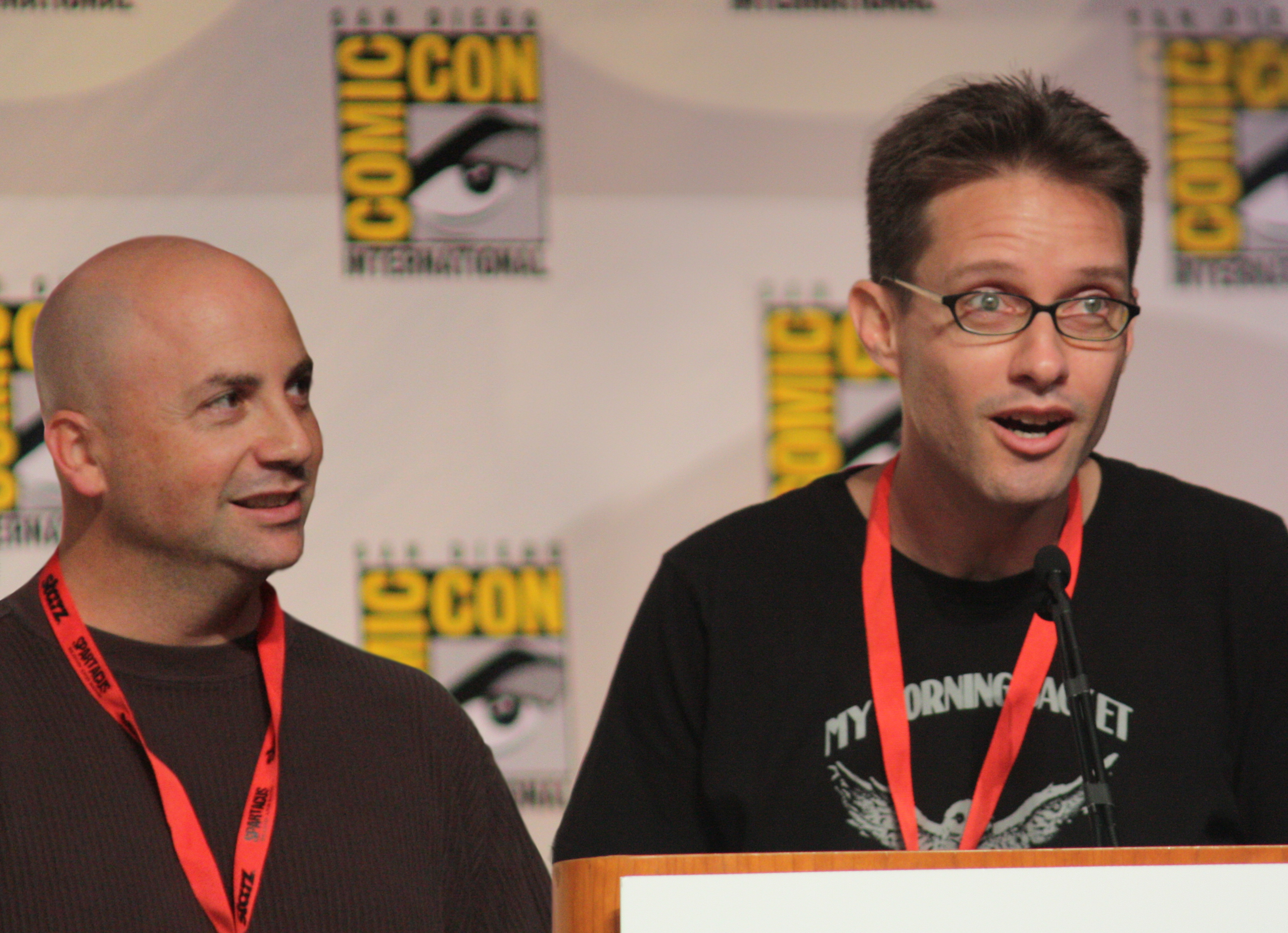
Mike Barker and Matt Weitzman wrote "A Hero Sits Next Door".

"A Hero Sits Next Door" was written by Mike Barker and Matt Weitzman, the first time writing for the series for both, and directed by Monte Young, also his first Family Guy episode. During the production of the episode, the writers shared one office lent to them by the King of the Hill production crew. MacFarlane compared the production of the first season to a college project; the only difference was that he was being funded this time. The guest cast for the episode featured actress Suzie Plakson, figure skater Michelle Kwan, as well as actors Wally Wingert and Carlos Alazraqui. Recurring guest voice actors included writer and animator Butch Hartman. "A Hero Sits Next Door" serves as the introduction of police lieutenant and neighbor of the Griffin family Joe Swanson (voiced by Patrick Warburton), as well as his family consisting of his wife Bonnie (Jennifer Tilly) and their son Kevin.

During the production of the episode they developed a way to hide the fact that Joe used a wheelchair. This was done by showing the character Joe from the waist up during part of the episode. "A Hero Sits Next Door" is notable as it is the first episode of Family Guy not to feature words in its title pertaining to "Death" or "Murder". This convention was originally started due to creator Seth MacFarlane being a fan of 1930s and 1940s radio programs, particularly the radio thriller anthology Suspense; however, this convention was dropped after individual episodes became hard to identify and the novelty wore off.

I'm a huge fan of old radio dramas and I came up with this idea, when the show was still trying to find itself at the beginning, that the title of each episode would be a very ominous title borrowed from an old 40's suspense drama. And thus we had titles like "Death Has a Shadow" and "Mind Over Murder" that had nothing to do with the show. We realized that that kind of stopped being funny after four episodes. It's two in the morning and we're trying to come up with these things. So we kind of grew out of that and moved on to more traditional titles.

— Seth MacFarlane, interview with IGN

The story of Joe getting crippled by the Grinch is revealed to be a cover up story in the episode "Joe's Revenge". In the episode, Joe reveals that he was actually paralyzed by a drug dealer, whom he was investigating, after accidentally giving himself away.

== Cultural references ==
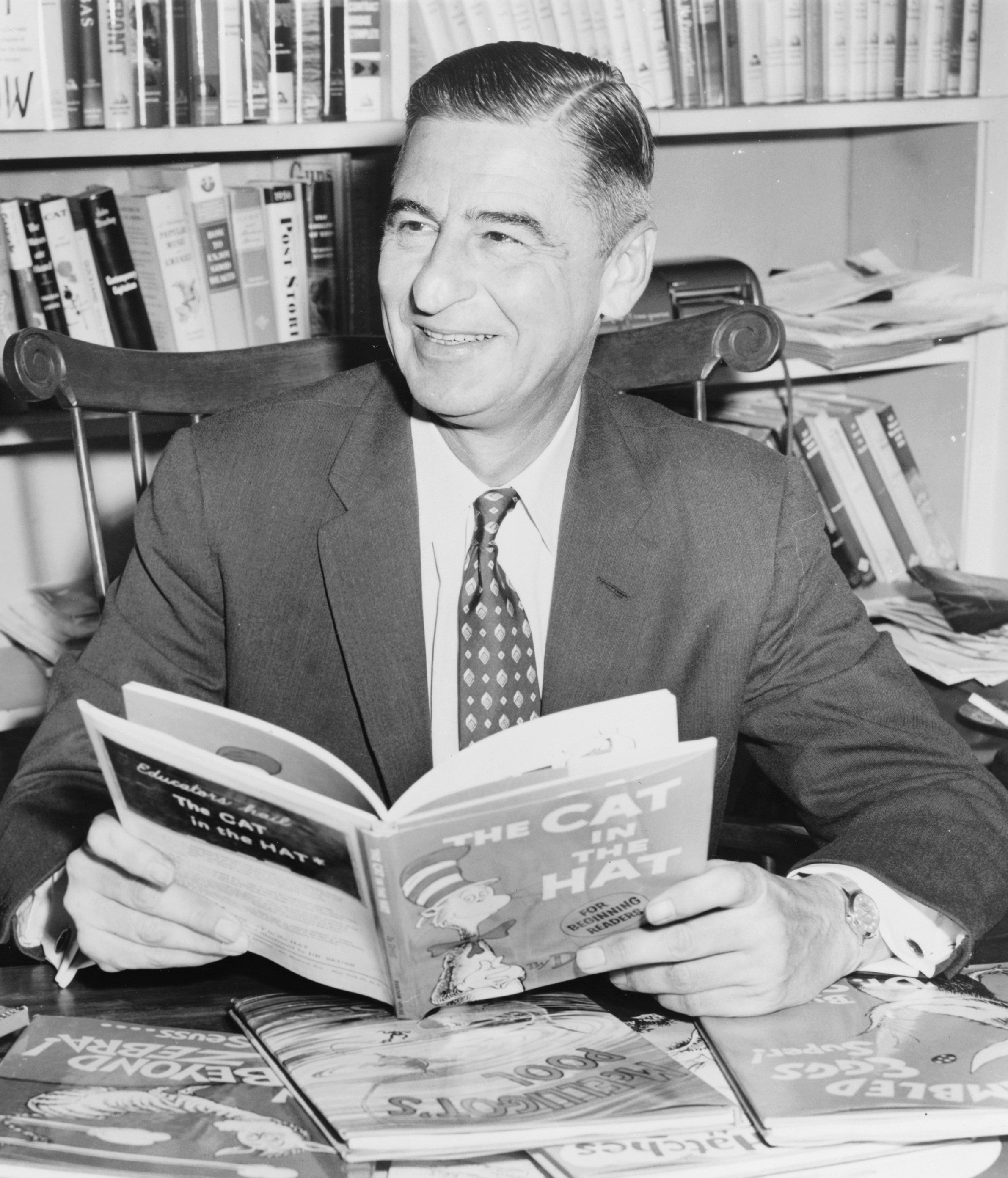
Dr. Seuss' children's story How the Grinch Stole Christmas! was referenced.

The Super Friends make an appearance in the episode when Peter references a time when he played strip poker in the Hall of Justice. After Wonder Woman loses and takes off her clothes, Robin simply stares at Peter instead of a naked Wonder Woman.

The episode also makes a historical reference when a boy is showing his friend a Pez dispenser that looks like John F. Kennedy's head. The dispenser is then destroyed by a policeman's bullet. The boy says, "Oh well, at least I still have my Bobby Kennedy Pez dispenser". This is a reference to the assassinations of both John and Robert Kennedy. In January 2012, MacFarlane told Entertainment Weekly that “There have been jokes that I would have rather we not have done. The JFK Pez Dispenser was something I would probably not do now.” The JFK and RFK assassination joke was cut in later reruns of the episode.

== Reception ==
"A Hero Sits Next Door" received favorable reviews from television critics. In a 2008 review, Ahsan Haque of IGN praised the episode, rating it a 7.9/10 and calling it "a great introduction for Joe". He noted that the fight sequence between Joe and the Grinch "paved the road for many action sequences to come". He also praised the strong emphasis on storyline. He deemed some of the gags "classic" including the gag featuring the Super Friends. Robin Pierson of The TV Critic wrote a more mixed review, rating the episode a 55 out of 100; Pierson found the plot odd, stating that its twists were counter intuitive, causing them to be less funny and not stand out. He also felt the cutaway jokes were short and average. He commented positively on some of the jokes, and the inclusion of Peter's new neighbors saying they provided a new dynamic to the series.
