= Mind Over Murder =

- Family Guy episode
- Episode no.: Season 1 Episode 4
- Directed by: Roy Allen Smith
- Written by: Neil Goldman; Garrett Donovan
- Production code: 1ACX03
- Original air date: April 25, 1999

Guest appearances
- Lori Alan as Diane Simmons; Carlos Alazraqui; Butch Hartman; Mike Henry as Cleveland Brown; Wally Wingert as the Pawtucket Patriot / Bert; Alex Rocco as Soccer Mom; Leslie Uggams as herself

Episode chronology
← Previous "Chitty Chitty Death Bang"	Next → "A Hero Sits Next Door"
- Family Guy season 1

"Mind Over Murder" is the fourth episode of the first season of the animated comedy series Family Guy. It originally aired on Fox in the United States on April 25, 1999. The episode features Peter after he is placed under house arrest, and decides to open his own bar in the family's basement. The bar immediately becomes a success among Peter's male friends when his wife, Lois, begins to sing and dance in front of them while wearing revealing clothing. Meanwhile, Stewie attempts to create a time travel device in order to escape the pain of teething.

The episode was written by Neil Goldman and Garrett Donovan and directed by Roy Allen Smith, all series firsts. Much of the episode's humor is structured around cutaway sequences that parody popular culture, including those centered on The Chronicles of Narnia, Sesame Street, Homicide: Life on the Street, Mentos, and the assassination of Abraham Lincoln. The title "Mind Over Murder" was inspired by the 1930s and 1940s radio programs, particularly the radio thriller anthology Suspense, which featured several elements pertaining to death and murder. The episode featured performances by guest stars Carlos Alazraqui, Butch Hartman, Alex Rocco, Leslie Uggams and Wally Wingert, along with several recurring voice actors for the series.

The episode received praise from IGN television critic Ahsan Haque for its storyline and use of cultural references.

== Plot ==
Stewie is in terrible pain from teething and cannot find comfort anywhere. When his mother Lois tells him that his pain will ultimately pass, it gives him the idea to build a machine that will move time forward to the point where his teething will have already stopped. Meanwhile, Lois tells Peter to drive their son Chris to his soccer match, then come right back to look after Stewie. However, Peter's friend Quagmire is there and has brought beer, so Peter decides to ignore Lois and stay at the game. While there, another member of the crowd insults Chris and smacks Peter's beer can out of his hand. Enraged, Peter punches the individual in the face, only to discover that it is a pregnant woman who looks and sounds like a man.

Peter is put under house arrest for assault and soon begins to miss his friends. Peter has a vision of the Pawtucket Patriot, a fictional ale mascot, from his ale can label, and on his advice, opens a bar in his basement so that his friends can come to visit. The basement bar soon becomes a local hotspot. Lois is upset about this until she gets a chance to sing on stage before an appreciative crowd. As she savors the spotlight over the next few days, Peter becomes increasingly uncomfortable with the attention she is getting, especially from the male patrons. Peter demands that she quit singing, but she refuses.

After his house arrest term ends, Peter is soon cornered by the neglected wives of his bar's patrons, and he invites them to drag their husbands out of his bar. Meanwhile, Stewie's time machine plans are accidentally discovered by Lois, who shows them around to the bar's patrons. Angered and upset that his plans have been discovered, Stewie runs upstairs. Soon after, the wives storm the bar, and Lois tells them that she only wants to feel appreciated and special, something to which all the other women relate. Meanwhile, Quagmire accidentally starts a fire.

Upstairs, Stewie takes drastic measures to protect his plans, programming the machine to go back in time before he drew them up. In the bar, Peter and Lois have a heart-to-heart conversation, and they do not immediately notice that the bar is burning. When they try to escape, the stairs become blocked, and they are trapped. Stewie reverses time just as Peter is having an epiphany about how poorly he treats Lois, and seconds before the basement bar goes up in flames. They all travel back in time to when Lois asked Peter to take Chris to the game. While he is getting ready, Peter trips on Stewie's time machine, destroying it and injuring his leg, thus preventing him from taking Chris to his soccer match, while Stewie is left to suffer with more teething pain.

== Production ==
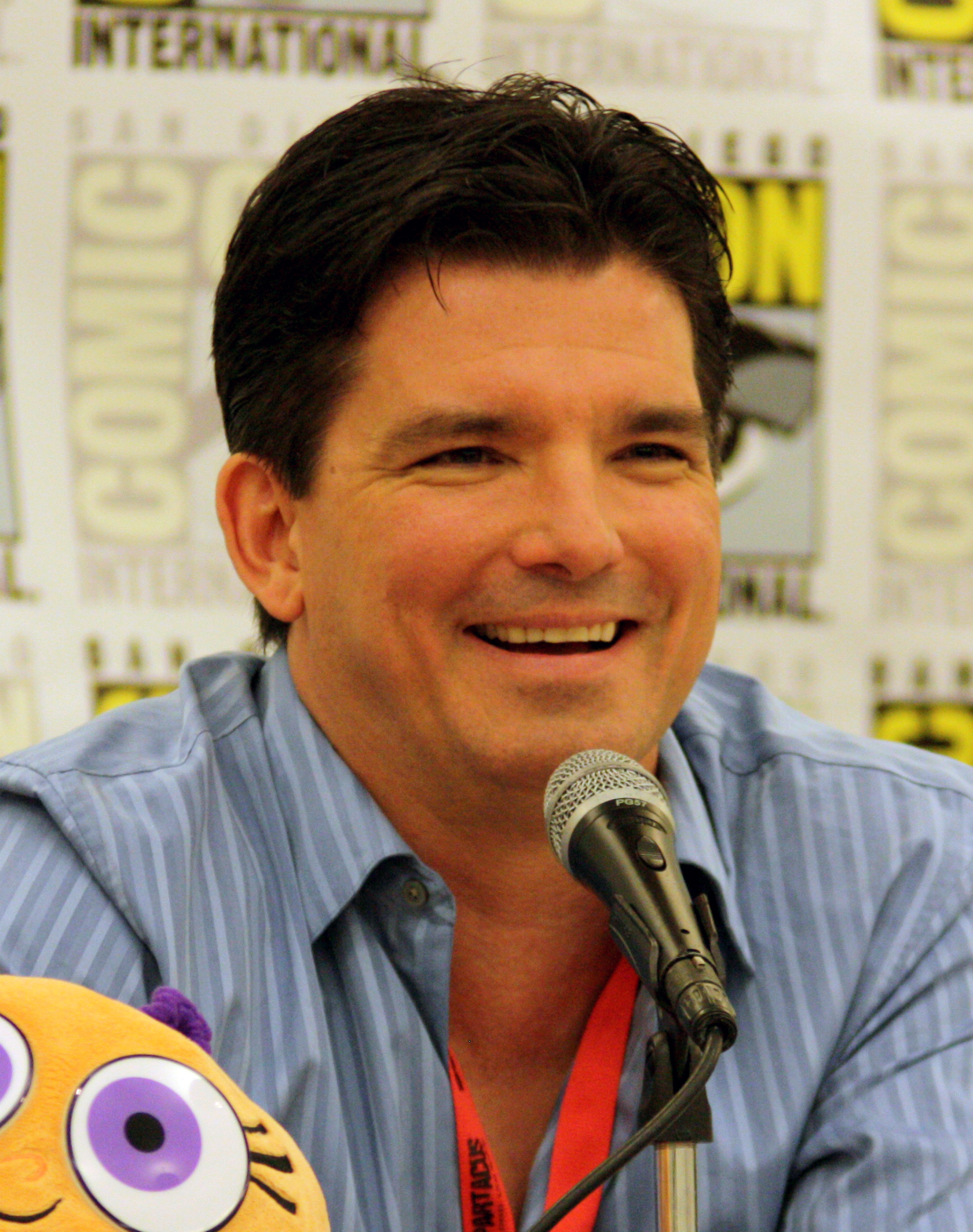
Butch Hartman guest starred in this episode.

"Mind Over Murder" was written by Neil Goldman and Garrett Donovan and directed by Roy Allen Smith, all of whom made their series debut with this episode. Peter Shin, who has since supervised other episodes of the show, acted as supervising director. Writer Andrew Gormley and voice actor Mike Henry acted as staff writers in this episode, while Ricky Blitt and Chris Sheridan worked as the story editors. In addition to the regular cast, the episode featured the voices of actors Leslie Uggams, Wally Wingert, Alex Rocco and Carlos Alazraqui. Recurring guest voice actors included actress Lori Alan and writer and animator Butch Hartman.

The title "Mind Over Murder", like the titles of the first three episodes of the season, was inspired by 1930s and 1940s radio programs, particularly the radio thriller anthology Suspense, which featured several elements pertaining to death and murder. This convention was dropped in the fifth episode of the season, "A Hero Sits Next Door", partly to make the episodes easier to distinguish by their titles.

== Cultural references ==
When Lois confronts Peter about the mess he is making in their house, he says he is terrible at housework. From this comes a cutaway which shows Peter doing the laundry. When he climbs into the machine in search of a missing sock, he falls into a wintry world where he encounters Mr. Tumnus from The Chronicles of Narnia.

While Peter is under house arrest, he states that he is getting bored with everything in the house, including the television shows, which he feels have blended together. A cutaway features Bert and Ernie from the children's television series Sesame Street, in a mix with the crime drama Homicide: Life on the Street.

When the Griffin family is watching television they see a commercial for Mentos-brand mints, which features the American stage actor John Wilkes Booth as he attempts to assassinate Abraham Lincoln.

When Stewie starts to feel pain around the inside of his mouth, Lois notices and states that he is teething. Stewie quickly responds by asking her to kill him, or to shake him like a British nanny, a reference to the Louise Woodward case.

== Reception ==
In his 2008 flashback review, Ahsan Haque of IGN praised the episode, rating it a 9/10, praising the "integration between the random jokes and the storyline", in comparison to later episodes. He criticized the "one-dimensional" nature of Stewie's character, but was impressed by the amount of story featured in this half-hour episode. In another article, Haque named Stewie's time machine plan from "Mind Over Murder" number five in his list of "Stewie's Top 10 Most Diabolical Evil Plans".

Robin Pierson of The TV Critic gave the episode a mixed review, with a 55%. rating. Pierson praised the episode's plot, the handling of Peter and Stewie, and some of the cutaways. He criticized the relationship between Lois and Peter as unconvincing. At the end of his review, he stated, "Family Guy doesn’t seem to have found the right balance yet between silliness and seriousness. So far its plots have been either irrelevant or emotionally unappealing. This was also a bit short on good jokes."
