= Michelle Kwan Figure Skating =

1999 video game

- Developer: Semi Logic Entertainments
- Platform: Microsoft Windows
- Release: 1999
- Genre: Sports game
- Mode: Single-player

Michelle Kwan Figure Skating is a computer game released in 1999, starring American figure skater Michelle Kwan.

The player can create the skater, dress her, choose music and create a routine to it, and then compete in different skating competitions.

While it does not follow the strict rules of international skating, there are logical reasons behind creating a program.

== Development ==
The game was developed by Semi Logic Entertainments, a company based in California.
