= Charlotte spiral =

Figure skating spiral

Figure skating element
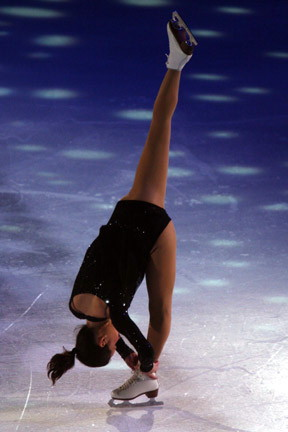
- Sasha Cohen executing a Charlotte spiral at the 2008 Stars on Ice tour stop in Portland, Oregon
- Element name: Charlotte spiral
- Alternative name: Candle stick spiral
- Element type: Spiral
- Named for: Charlotte Oelschlägel

The Charlotte (pronounced shar-lot) spiral, also known as the candle stick or fadeout, is a figure skating spiral. The skater bends forward and glides on one leg with the other one lifted into the air. The skater's torso is upright, but during the Charlotte, the skater's torso is as close to the grounded foot as possible. When performed well, the skater's legs are almost in a straight vertical split position. The Charlotte requires great flexibility and balance.

A Charlotte can be performed either forward or backward. It is usually performed backwards, although some skaters have performed it forwards in competition.

The Charlotte is named for German skater Charlotte Oelschlägel, who first performed the move in the early 1900s. Sonia Henie performed the move in some of her films, as well as her Olympic program in 1936. Michelle Kwan and Sasha Cohen picked up the move several decades later.

The position is rarely performed by men, notable exceptions being John Curry, Rohene Ward, Michael Christian Martinez and a few others.
