= Charlotte Oelschlägel =

German figure skater (1898–1984)

Charlotte Oelschlagel
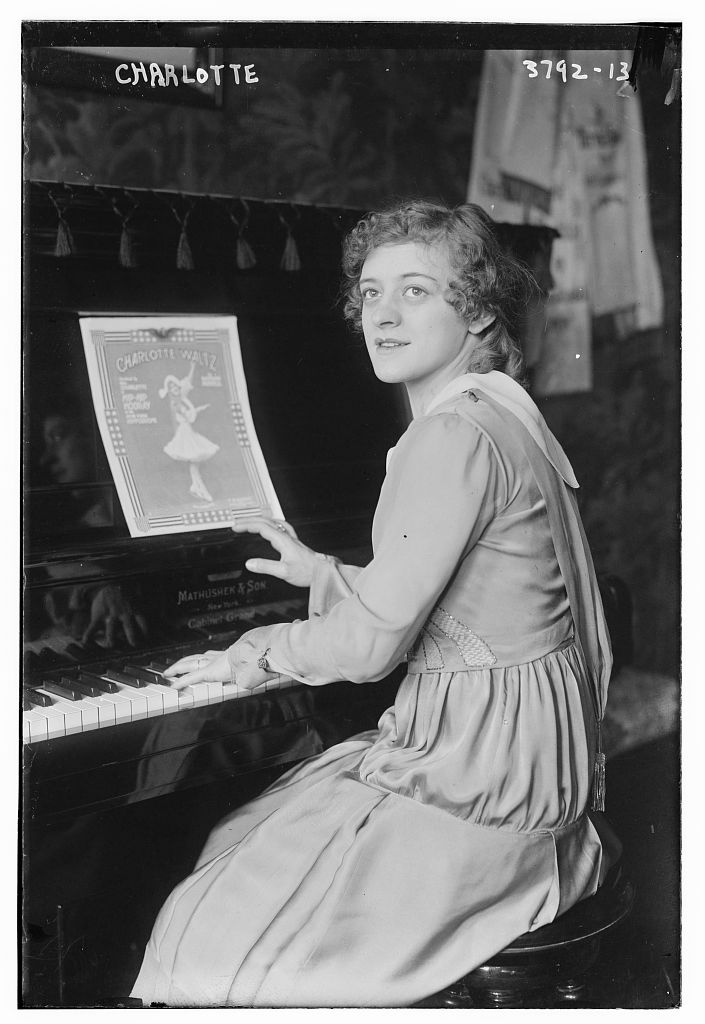
- Charlotte Oelschlagel in 1916

Personal information
- Full name: Charlotte Oelschlagel
- Other names: Charlotte Hayward
- Born: August 14, 1898 Berlin
- Died: November 14, 1984 (aged 86) Berlin

Figure skating career
- Country: Germany

Charlotte Oelschlägel, aka Charlotte Hayward (August 14, 1898 – November 14, 1984) was a German professional skater. For most of her life, she used only her first name as her stage name. She invented and first performed the figure skating elements death spiral and Charlotte spiral, which is named after her.

== Personal life ==
Charlotte Oelschlägel was born in Berlin. As well as being a figure skater, she was also a musician. At age seven, she was on stage with the Berlin Philharmonic. She played the mandolin, lute, harp and piano. She began skating after a nervous breakdown; a physician recommended she try exercising outdoors to recover, and her mother took her figure skating.

She was married first in 1922 to Anselm Gotzl, a composer and conductor for one of her shows; he died eight months later. She remarried in 1925 to Curt Neumann, also a figure skater. She died in a retirement home in Berlin in November 1984.

== Career ==
Oelschlägel was coached by Paul Münder. She began skating professionally in 1908 at ten years old. She was known professionally by her first name.

In 1910, she began appearing in ice ballets in Berlin. Around 1914, she saw a performance by Anna Pavlova, which influenced her skating style. In 1915, she became the first performer to star in a Broadway ice show, appearing in Hip-Hip-Hooray! at the New York Hippodrome, which the cast performed 425 times in 300 days. She was also the first skater to star in a motion picture, the American drama film The Frozen Warning (1916), which figure skating historian James R. Hines calls "the first motion picture to include figure skating".

Oelschlägel performed in then-unusual outfits with white boots and knee-length skirts. According to figure skater writer and historian Ellyn Kestnbaum, Oelschlägel "brought skating into the conventions of specularized femininity that characterized early-twentieth-century popular entertainment". She also published a book in 1916, The Hippodrome Skating Book, which contained both photographs of herself and instructional material, meant to encourage interest in skating.

Throughout the 1920s, Oelschlägel toured in a variety of countries, including the United States, Mexico, Cuba, Germany, and Spain. She skated in a new show just two days after her first husband's death in 1923; she collapsed two months later and temporarily retired before going on to perform for the rest of the 1920s and 1930s. During this time, and Neumann developed the death spiral and the move named for her, the Charlotte spiral (also called the "fadeout"), "a back spiral with the upper body leaning toward the skating foot and the free leg lifted to almost 180 degrees". These moves advanced the development of the use of moves demanding high flexibility in figure skating, which, as Kestnbaum states, "generally favor a female rather than a male physique".

Her professional figure skating career ended in 1939. She returned home due to her mother's death and was still in Germany at the beginning of World War II. As she and her husband could not leave the country and would not skate for the Nazis, they were forced to retire. After the end of the war, they traveled to the American occupation zone with only what they could carry; most of their financial assets were left behind in Potsdam, which became part of East Germany. After the war, she worked as a coach and lived quietly, as she was better-known outside of Germany. She was inducted into the World Figure Skating Hall of Fame in 1985. She has been called "figure skating's first major theatrical star".
