= 1948 World Figure Skating Championships =

Annual figure skating competition held in 1948

- Type: ISU Championship
- Date: February 11 – 15
- Season: 1948
- Location: Davos, Switzerland

Champions
- Men's singles: (United States) Richard Button
- Ladies' singles: (Canada) Barbara Ann Scott
- Pairs: (Belgium) Micheline Lannoy / Pierre Baugniet
- Previous: 1947 World Championships
- Next: 1949 World Championships

The World Figure Skating Championships is an annual figure skating competition sanctioned by the International Skating Union in which figure skaters compete for the title of World Champion.

The 1948 competitions for men, ladies, and pair skating took place from February 11 to 15 in Davos, Switzerland. These were the second World Figure Skating Championships after World War II. Skaters from Germany and Japan were still not allowed to compete.

== Medal table ==
* Host nation (Switzerland)

Rank	Nation	Gold	Silver	Bronze	Total
1	Canada	1	0	1	2
2	Belgium	1	0	0	1
2	United States	1	0	0	1
4	Hungary	0	1	1	2
5	Austria	0	1	0	1
5	Switzerland*	0	1	0	1
7	Czechoslovakia	0	0	1	1
Totals (7 entries)		3	3	3	9

== Results ==
=== Men ===
Rank	Name	Places
1	(United States) Dick Button	11
2	(Switzerland) Hans Gerschwiler	19
3	(Hungary) Ede Király	28
4	(United States) John Lettengarver	32
5	(United States) James Grogan	52
6	(United Kingdom) Graham Sharp	53
7	(Austria) Helmut Seibt	76
8	(Austria) Hellmuth May	79
9	(Canada) Wallace Diestelmeyer	85
10	(Czechoslovakia) Vladislav Čáp	84
11	(Belgium) Fernand Leemans	80
12	(Czechoslovakia) Zdeněk Fikar	105
13	(Denmark) Per Cock-Clausen	115
WD	(Austria) Edi Rada	DNS

Judges:

- (Switzerland) Eugen Kirchhofer
- (Czechoslovakia) Vladimir Koudelka
- (United Kingdom) Hubert Martineau
- (Denmark) Harry Meistrup
- (Canada) Melville Rogers
- (Austria) Adolf Rosdol
- (United States) Harold G. Stroke
- (Hungary) Marcell Vadas
- (Belgium) A. Voordeckers

=== Ladies ===
Rank	Name	Places
1	(Canada) Barbara Ann Scott	11
2	(Austria) Eva Pawlik	25
3	(Czechoslovakia) Jiřína Nekolová	32
4	(United Kingdom) Jeanette Altwegg	36
5	(Czechoslovakia) Alena Vrzáňová	39
6	(United States) Yvonne Sherman	71
7	(Austria) Marta Bachem-Musilek	81
8	(United Kingdom) Bridget Adams	83
9	(Hungary) Andrea Kékesy	93
10	(Czechoslovakia) Dagmar Lerchová	109
11	(Hungary) Mária Saáry	102
12	(Canada) Marilyn Take	97
13	(Canada) Suzanne Morrow	107
14	(Switzerland) Maja Hug	124
15	(United Kingdom) Marion Davies	113
16	(United Kingdom) Barbara Wyatt	135
17	(United Kingdom) Beryl Bailey	141
18	(France) Jacqueline du Bief	149
19	(United Kingdom) Jill Hood-Linzee	163
20	(Switzerland) Lotti Höner	179

Judges:

- (United Kingdom) Kenneth Beaumont
- (United States) Bernard Fox
- (Denmark) Harry Meistrup
- (Austria) Hans Meixner
- (Canada) Melville Rogers
- (Hungary) Elemér Terták
- (France) Georges Torchon
- (Switzerland) A. Winkler
- (Czechoslovakia) K. Zemek

=== Pairs ===
Rank	Name	Places
1	(Belgium) Micheline Lannoy / Pierre Baugniet	13.5
2	(Hungary) Andrea Kékesy / Ede Király	24.5
3	(Canada) Suzanne Morrow / Wallace Diestelmeyer	26
4	(United States) Karol Kennedy / Peter Kennedy	38.5
5	(United States) Yvonne Sherman / Robert Swenning	45
6	(United Kingdom) Winifred Silverthorne / Dennis Silverthorne	51.5
7	(Hungary) Marianna Nagy / László Nagy	72
8	(United Kingdom) Jennifer Nicks / John Nicks	80.5
9	(Czechoslovakia) Blažena Knittlová / Karel Vosátka	86.5
10	(Switzerland) Luny Unold / Hans Kuster	91
11	(Austria) Herta Ratzenhofer / Emil Ratzenhofer	92
12	(United Kingdom) Joan Oglivie-Thompson / Robert Thompson	95
13	(Austria) Susi Giebisch / Helmut Seibt	104
14	(Switzerland) Eliane Steinemann / André Calame	125
WD	(France) Denise Favart / Jacques Favart	DNS

Judges:

- (Austria) Rudolf Kaler
- (Switzerland) James Koch
- (Czechoslovakia) Vladimir Koudelka
- (United Kingdom) Mollie Phillips
- (Canada) Melville Rogers
- (United States) Harold G. Storke
- (France) Georges Torchon
- (Hungary) Marcell Vadas
- (Belgium) A. Voordeckers
