= 1947 European Figure Skating Championships =

Figure skating competition

1947 European Championships
- Type: ISU Championship
- Date: January 31 – February 2
- Season: 1946–47
- Location: Davos, Switzerland

Champions
- Men's singles: (Switzerland) Hans Gerschwiler
- Ladies' singles: (Canada) Barbara Ann Scott
- Pairs: (Belgium) Micheline Lannoy / Pierre Baugniet
- Previous: 1939 European Championships
- Next: 1948 European Championships

The 1947 European Figure Skating Championships were held in Davos, Switzerland from January 31 to February 2. Elite senior-level figure skaters from European ISU member nations, in addition to the United States, Canada, and Australia, competed for the title of European Champion in the disciplines of men's singles, ladies' singles, and pair skating. Athletes from Germany and Austria were not admitted. Barbara Ann Scott is the only winner from outside Europe in ladies' singles.

== Results ==
=== Men ===
Rank	Name	Places
1	(Switzerland) Hans Gerschwiler	
2	(Czechoslovakia) Vladislav Čáp	
3	(Belgium) Fernand Leemans	
4	(United Kingdom) Arthur Apfel	
5	(Czechoslovakia) Zdeněk Fikar	
6	(Switzerland) Fritz Dürst	

=== Ladies ===
Rank	Name	Places
1	(Canada) Barbara Ann Scott	
2	(United States) Gretchen Merrill	
3	(United Kingdom) Daphne Walker	
4	(United Kingdom) Jeannette Altwegg	
5	(Czechoslovakia) Jiřina Nekolová	
6	(Czechoslovakia) Alena Vrzáňová	
7	(United Kingdom) Marion Davies	
8	(Switzerland) Maja Hug	
9	(United Kingdom) Bridget Adams	
10	(United Kingdom) Jill Hood-Linzee	
11	(Czechoslovakia) Dagmar Lerchová	
12	(United Kingdom) Barbara Wyatt	
13	(United States) Roberta Scholdan	
14	(Switzerland) Ursula Arnold	
15	(Belgium) Simone Clinckers	
16	(Australia) Patricia Molony	
17	(Switzerland) Lotti Höner	
18	(Sweden) Gun Hammarin	
19	(Sweden) Anne-Marie Sjöberg	
WD	(Sweden) Gun Ericson	DNS

=== Pairs ===
Rank	Name	Places
1	(Belgium) Micheline Lannoy / Pierre Baugniet	
2	(United Kingdom) Winifred Silverthorne / Dennis Silverthorne	
3	(Belgium) Suzanne Diskeuve / Edmond Verbustel	
4	(France) Denise Fayolle / Guy Pigier	
5	(Czechoslovakia) Běla Zachova / Jaroslav Zach	
6	(United Kingdom) Jennifer Nicks / John Nicks	
7	(Switzerland) Luny Unold / Hans Kuster	
8	(France) Denise Favart / Jacques Favart	
9	(United Kingdom) Pamela Davis / Ernest Yates	
10	(Czechoslovakia) Eva Doušová / Jaroslav Sadílek	
11	(Sweden) Kerstin Wikman / Harry Berlin	
