= Figure skating at the 1948 Winter Olympics – Ladies' singles =

Figure skating at the Olympics

Ladies' singles at the V Olympic Winter Games
- Venue: St. Moritz Olympic Ice Rink
- Dates: 3-6 February 1948
- Competitors: 25 from 10 nations

Medalists
1st place, gold medalist(s)		Barbara Ann Scott; Canada
2nd place, silver medalist(s)		Eva Pawlik; Austria
3rd place, bronze medalist(s)		Jeannette Altwegg; Great Britain

The ladies' individual skating event was held as part of the figure skating at the 1948 Winter Olympics. It was the seventh appearance of the event, which had previously been held twice at the Summer Olympics in 1908 and 1920 and at all four Winter Games from 1924 onward. The competition was held from 3 to 6 February 1948. Twenty-five figure skaters from ten nations competed.

== Results ==
Rank	Name	Nation	CF		FS	Total points	Places
1	Barbara Ann Scott	Canada	1	858.1	1	163.077	11
2	Eva Pawlik	Austria	3	832.1	2	157.588	24
3	Jeannette Altwegg	Great Britain	2	842.1	6	156.166	28
4	Jirína Nekolová	Czechoslovakia	4	807.2	4	154.088	34
5	Alena Vrzáňová	Czechoslovakia	7	797.2	3	153.044	44
6	Yvonne Sherman	United States	8	783.9	5	149.833	62
7	Bridget Shirley Adams	Great Britain	5	806.8	16	148.644	69
8	Gretchen Merrill	United States	6	798.0	11	148.466	73
9	Martha Musilek Bachem	Austria	14	744.5	7	144.456	103
10	Marion Davies	Great Britain	11	763.5	12	144.766	104
11	Eileen Seigh	United States	10	755.8	10	144.111	110
12	Marilyn Ruth Take	Canada	12	754.1	13	143.722	110.5
13	Dagmar Lerchová	Czechoslovakia	15	745.5	8	144.433	112
14	Suzanne Morrow	Canada	9	761.9	15	143.655	117
15	Maja Hug	Switzerland	13	755.9	19	141.522	137
16	Jacqueline du Bief	France	16	746.0	21	139.022	147.5
17	Mária Saáry	Hungary	17	739.3	14	140.944	142
18	Hildegard Appeltauer	Austria	18	743.7	20	139.300	155
19	Jill Hood-Linzee	Great Britain	19	742.8	18	140.200	145
20	Inge Solar	Austria	23	677.8	9	135.444	186
21	Éva Lindner	Hungary	22	679.7	17	134.188	192
22	Marit Henie	Norway	21	699.4	23	133.111	194
23	Lotti Höner	Switzerland	20	699.1	22	134.211	186
24	Grazia Barcellona	Italy	25	607.9	24	122.211	218
25	Doris Blanc	Switzerland	24	635.6	25	122.622	221

Referee:

- (Netherlands) Gustavus F.C. Witt

Assistant Referee:

- (Switzerland) Jakob Biedermann

Judges:

- (Italy) Ercole Cattaneo
- (United Kingdom) Harold G. Storke
- (Switzerland) Eugen Kirchhofer
- (United Kingdom) Hubert M. Martineau
- (Canada) Melville F. Rogers
- (Austria) Adolf Rosdol
- (France) Georges Torchon
- (Hungary) Marcell Vadas
- (Czechoslovakia) Karel Zemek
- (Norway) Christen Christensen (substitute)
