= 1950 World Figure Skating Championships =

Annual figure skating competition held in 1950

- Type: ISU Championship
- Date: 6 – 8 March
- Season: 1950
- Location: (United Kingdom) Wembley, UK
- Venue: Wembley Arena

Champions
- Men's singles: (United States) Richard Button
- Ladies' singles: (Czechoslovakia) Alena Vrzanova
- Pairs: (United States) Karol Kennedy / Peter Kennedy
- Previous: 1949 World Championships
- Next: 1951 World Championships

The World Figure Skating Championships is an annual figure skating competition sanctioned by the International Skating Union in which figure skaters compete for the title of World Champion.

The 1950 championships took place from 6 to 8 March in Wembley, United Kingdom.

== Results ==
=== Men ===
Rank	Name	CF	FS	Total	Places
1	(United States) Dick Button	824.71	594.76	1419.47	7
2	(Hungary) Ede Király	778.86	566.06	1344.92	14
3	(United States) Hayes Alan Jenkins	728.93	549.03	1277.96	25
4	(Austria) Helmut Seibt	739.90	534.45	1274.35	29
5	(United States) Austin Holt	723.21	524.30	1247.51	34
6	(United Kingdom) Michael Carrington	704.55	537.25	1241.80	38
7	(Australia) Reg Park	672.50	497.60	1170.10	51
8	(Canada) Roger Wickson	686.00	473.20	1159.20	55
9	(Denmark) Per Cock-Clausen	652.98	443.45	1096.43	62

- Referee: (Switzerland) James Koch
- Assistant Referee: (Netherlands) Gustavus F. C. Witt

Judges:

- (Canada) Norman V. S. Gregory
- (Switzerland) A. Huber
- (Austria) Fritz Kachler
- (Denmark) Harry Meistrup
- (United Kingdom) Graham Sharp
- (United States) Harold G. Storke
- (Hungary) Elemér Terták

=== Ladies ===
Rank	Name	CF	FS	Total	Places
1	(Czechoslovakia) Álena Vrzáňová	790.65	568.51	1359.16	12
2	(United Kingdom) Jeannette Altwegg	789.71	556.00	1345.71	18
3	(United States) Yvonne Sherman	782.48	548.10	1330.58	23
4	(Canada) Suzanne Morrow	766.38	553.35	1319.73	24
5	(United States) Sonya Klopfer	734.18	560.93	1295.11	37*
6	(France) Jacqueline du Bief	741.53	560.93	1302.46	36
7	(United States) Virginia Baxter	715.28	552.41	1267.69	54
8	(Czechoslovakia) Jiřina Nekolová	755.18	491.98	1247.16	62
9	(Canada) Marlene Smith	719.60	537.83	1257.43	64
10	(United Kingdom) Barbara Wyatt	725.78	514.03	139.81	69
11	(United States) Andra McLaughlin	707.70	525.11	1232.81	74
12	(Czechoslovakia) Dagmar Lerchová	714.93	499.56	1214.49	83
13	(United Kingdom) Valda Osborn	704.78	496.18	1200.96	85
14	(United Kingdom) Beryl Bailey	689.15	501.31	1190.46	94

*: better placed due to the majority of the better placings

- Referee: (United Kingdom) Kenneth Beaumont
- Assistant Referee: (Netherlands) Gustavus F. C. Witt

Judges:

- (Canada) Norman V. S. Gregory
- (Czechoslovakia) J. Hainz
- (Denmark) Harry Meistrup
- (United States) Harold G. Storke
- (France) Georges Torchon
- (Belgium) A. Voordeckers
- (United Kingdom) Geoffrey Yates

=== Pairs ===
Rank	Name	Total	Places
1	(United States) Karol Kennedy / Peter Kennedy	96.07	15
2	(United Kingdom) Jennifer Nicks / John Nicks	92.70	28.5
3	(Hungary) Marianna Nagy / László Nagy	92.25	32
4	(Switzerland) Eliane Steinemann / André Calame	90.00	44.5
5	(Belgium) Suzanne Gheldorf / Jacques Rénard	89.43	48.5
6	(Austria) Elly Stärck / Harry Gareis	88.08	61
7	(Canada) Marlene Smith / Donald Gilchrist	87.07	63*
8	(United Kingdom) Joan Waterhouse / Gordon Holloway	88.31	62
9	(Belgium) Liliane de Becker / Edmond Verbustel	88.42	64
10	(United States) Irene Maguire / Walter Mühlbronner	84.26	82
11	(United Kingdom) Sybil Cooke / Robert Hudson	83.47	93.5
12	(France) Denise Favart / Jacques Favart	77.73	108

*: better placed due to the majority of the better placings

- Referee: (United States) Walter Powell

Judges:

- (Canada) Norman V. S. Gregory
- (Switzerland) A. Huber
- (Austria) Fritz Kachler
- (Denmark) Harry Meistrup
- (United States) Harold G. Storke
- (Hungary) Elemér Terták
- (France) Georges Torchon
- (Belgium) A. Voordeckers
- (United Kingdom) Ernest Yates

=== Ice Dance (unofficial) ===
Rank	Name	Places
1	(United States) Lois Waring / Michael McGean	
2	(United Kingdom) Sybil Cooke / Robert Hudson	
3	(United States) Irene Maguire / Walter Mühlbronner	
