= Figure skating at the 1948 Winter Olympics – Pairs =

Figure skating at the Olympics

Pair skating at the V Olympic Winter Games
- Venue: Olympia Eisstadion Badrutts Park
- Date: February 7, 1948
- Competitors: 30 from 11 nations

Medalists
1st place, gold medalist(s)		Micheline Lannoy / Pierre Baugniet; Belgium
2nd place, silver medalist(s)		Andrea Kékesy / Ede Király; Hungary
3rd place, bronze medalist(s)		Suzanne Morrow / Wallace Diestelmeyer; Canada

The pair skating event was held as part of the figure skating at the 1948 Winter Olympics. It was the seventh appearance of the event, which had previously been held twice at the Summer Olympics in 1908 and 1920 and at all four Winter Games from 1924 onward. The competition was held on 7 February 1948. Thirty figure skaters from eleven nations competed.

== Results ==
Rank	Name	Nation	Points	Places
1	Micheline Lannoy / Pierre Baugniet	Belgium	11.227	17.5
2	Andrea Kékesy / Ede Király	Hungary	11.109	26
3	Suzanne Morrow / Wallace Diestelmeyer	Canada	11.000	31
4	Yvonne Sherman / Robert Swenning	United States	10.581	53
5	Winifred Silverthorne / Dennis Silverthorne	Great Britain	10.572	53
6	Karol Kennedy / Peter Kennedy	United States	10.536	59.5
7	Marianna Nagy / László Nagy	Hungary	9.909	89
8	Jennifer Nicks / John Nicks	Great Britain	9.700	98
9	Herta Ratzenhofer / Emil Ratzenhofer	Austria	9.436	111.5
10	Margot Walle / Allan Fjeldheim	Norway	9.281	118.5
11	Susanne Giebisch / Hellmut Seibt	Austria	9.290	117.5
12	Luny Unold / Hans Kuster	Switzerland	9.281	120
13	Grazia Barcellona / Carlo Fassi	Italy	9.263	121.5
14	Denise Favart / Jacques Favart	France	8.700	139
WD	Blažena Knittlová / Karel Vosátka	Czechoslovakia		

Referee:

- (Netherlands) Gustavus F.C. Witt

Assistant Referee:

- (Switzerland) James Koch

Judges:

- (Norway) Christen Christensen
- (United States) M. Bernard Fox
- (Austria) Rudolf Kaler
- (Switzerland) Eugen Kirchhofer
- (Czechoslovakia) Vladimír Koudelka
- (United Kingdom) Mollie Phillips
- (Canada) Melville F. Rogers
- (Hungary) Elemér Terták
- (France) Georges Torchon
- (Italy) Mario Verdi
