= 1948 European Figure Skating Championships =

Figure skating competition

1948 European Championships
- Type: ISU Championship
- Season: 1947–48
- Location: Prague, Czechoslovakia

Champions
- Men's singles: (United States) Dick Button
- Ladies' singles: (Canada) Barbara Ann Scott
- Pairs: (Hungary) Andrea Kékesy / Ede Király
- Previous: 1947 European Championships
- Next: 1949 European Championships

The 1948 European Figure Skating Championships were held in Prague, Czechoslovakia. Elite senior-level figure skaters from European ISU member nations, in addition to the United States and Canada, competed for the title of European Champion in the disciplines of men's singles, ladies' singles, and pair skating.

Because North Americans were allowed to participate, the best European single skaters, Eva Pawlik of Austria and Hans Gerschwiler of Switzerland, were awarded only the European Silver Medals. That was the reason the International Skating Union restricted the 1949 Europeans and all the following European Championships to European skaters. Dick Button is the only winner from outside Europe in men's singles. Barbara Ann Scott is the only winner from outside Europe in ladies' singles, this was her second title.

== Results ==
=== Men ===
Rank	Name	Places
1	(United States) Dick Button	
2	(Switzerland) Hans Gerschwiler	
3	(Austria) Edi Rada	
4	(Hungary) Ede Király	26
5	(United States) John Lettengarver	
6	(Czechoslovakia) Zdeněk Fikar	
7	(Austria) Helmut Seibt	
8	(Czechoslovakia) Vladislav Čáp	
9	(Czechoslovakia) Josef Dědič	

=== Ladies ===
Rank	Name	Places
1	(Canada) Barbara Ann Scott	
2	(Austria) Eva Pawlik	
3	(Czechoslovakia) Alena Vrzáňová	
4	(Czechoslovakia) Jiřina Nekolová	
5	(United Kingdom) Jeannette Altwegg	
6	(Czechoslovakia) Dagmar Lerchová	
7	(Hungary) Andrea Kékesy	
8	(United Kingdom) Bridget Adams	
9	(United Kingdom) Marion Davies	
10	(United Kingdom) Barbara Wyatt	
11	(Austria) Martha Bachem	
12	(Czechoslovakia) Miloslava Tumová	
13	(Austria) Ingeborg Solar	
14	(Hungary) Éva Lindner	
15	(Austria) Hildegard Appeltauer	
16	(Hungary) Mária Saáry	
17	(United Kingdom) Beryl Bailey	
18	(United States) Roberta Scholdan	
19	(Czechoslovakia) Věra Masáková	

=== Pairs ===
Rank	Name	Places
1	(Hungary) Andrea Kékesy / Ede Király	5
2	(Czechoslovakia) Blažena Knittlová / Karel Vosátka	
3	(Austria) Herta Ratzenhofer / Emil Ratzenhofer	
4	(United Kingdom) Joan Thompson / Robert Ogilvie	
5	(United Kingdom) Jennifer Nicks / John Nicks	
6	(Hungary) Marianna Nagy / László Nagy	29.5
7	(Hungary) Györgyi Botond / Ferenc Kertész	
8	(Austria) Susi Giebisch / Helmut Seibt	
9	(Czechoslovakia) Dagmar Hrubá / Jiří Očenášek	
10	(Austria) Elly Stärck / Harry Gareis	
11	(Czechoslovakia) P. Přenosilová / František Landi	
