= 1949 World Figure Skating Championships =

Annual figure skating competition held in 1949

- Type: ISU Championship
- Date: 16 – 18 February 1949
- Season: 1949
- Location: Paris, France

Champions
- Men's singles: (United States) Dick Button
- Ladies' singles: (Czechoslovakia) Alena Vrzáňová
- Pairs: (Hungary) Andrea Kékesy / Ede Király
- Previous: 1948 World Championships
- Next: 1950 World Championships

The World Figure Skating Championships is an annual figure skating competition sanctioned by the International Skating Union in which amateur figure skaters compete for the title of World Champion.

The 1949 championships took place from 16 to 18 February 1949 in Paris, France. At the men's event, the favorite, Dick Button won. At the women's event, however, the favorite, Eva Pawlik of Austria, who had been the Olympic runner-up behind Barbara Ann Scott one year before and who had just won the European title in 1949, dropped out because of a broken boot heel just before the free program. which provided Alena Vrzáňová of Czechoslovakia with the opportunity to win the gold medal. She became the first woman to perform a double lutz.

== Medal table ==
* Host nation (France)

Rank	Nation	Gold	Silver	Bronze	Total
1	United States	1	2	1	4
2	Hungary	1	1	0	2
3	Czechoslovakia	1	0	0	1
4	Austria	0	0	1	1
4	Great Britain	0	0	1	1
Totals (5 entries)		3	3	3	9

== Results ==
=== Men ===
Rank	Name	Places
1	(United States) Dick Button	5
2	(Hungary) Ede Király	12
3	(Austria) Edi Rada	13
4	(United States) James Grogan	23
5	(Austria) Helmut Seibt	26
6	(United States) Hayes Alan Jenkins	29
7	(United States) Austin Holt	34
8	(Italy) Carlo Fassi	38
9	(Denmark) Per Cock-Clausen	45
10	(France) Jean Vives	50

Judges:

- (Hungary) Ferenc Kertész
- (Austria) Edwin Kucharz
- (Denmark) Harry Meistrup
- (United States) Harold G. Storke
- (Italy) Mario Verdi

=== Ladies ===
Rank	Name	Places
1	(Czechoslovakia) Alena Vrzáňová	7
2	(United States) Yvonne Sherman	17
3	(United Kingdom) Jeannette Altwegg	18
4	(Czechoslovakia) Jiřina Nekolová	44.5
5	(United Kingdom) Bridget Adams	46
6	(United States) Andra McLaughlin	48
7	(United States) Virginia Baxter	53
8	(Czechoslovakia) Dagmar Lerchová	55
9	(France) Jacqueline du Bief	67
10	(United Kingdom) Barbara Wyatt	68.5
11	(United States) Helen Uhl	71
12	(United Kingdom) Valda Osborn	73
13	(United Kingdom) Beryl Bailey	82
14	(Austria) Lilly Fuchs	85
15	(France) Liliane Madaule	105

Judges:

- (United Kingdom) Kenneth Beaumont
- (Hungary) Ferenc Kertész
- (Switzerland) James Koch
- (Austria) Adolf Rosdol
- (United States) Harold G. Storke
- (France) Georges Torchon
- (Czechoslovakia) Josef Vosolsobě

=== Pairs ===
Rank	Name	Places
1	(Hungary) Andrea Kékesy / Ede Király	7
2	(United States) Karol Kennedy / Peter Kennedy	14.5
3	(United States) Ann Davies / Carleton Hoffner	31.5
4	(Hungary) Marianna Nagy / László Nagy	33
5	(Austria) Herta Ratzenhofer / Emil Ratzenhofer	35.5*
6	(United Kingdom) Jennifer Nicks / John Nicks	35.5
7	(Czechoslovakia) Běla Zachova / Jaroslav Zach	49.5
8	(Switzerland) Eliane Steinemann / André Calame	56.5
9	(Austria) Elly Stärck / Harry Gareis	56.5*
10	(France) Denise Favart / Jacques Favart	63
11	(Belgium) Suzanne Gheldorf / Jacques Rénard	75
12	(United Kingdom) Pamela Davis / Peter Scholes	78.5

*Better placed due to the majority of the better places

Judges:

- (Switzerland) Emile Finsterwald
- (Hungary) Ferenc Kertész
- (United Kingdom) Mollie Phillips
- (Austria) Adolf Rosdol
- (United States) Harold G. Storke
- (France) Georges Torchon
- (Czechoslovakia) Josef Vosolsobě
