= Figure skating at the 1948 Winter Olympics – Men's singles =

Men's singles at the V Olympic Winter Games
- Venue: Olympia Eisstadion Badrutts Park
- Dates: 2–5 February 1948
- Competitors: 16 from 10 nations

Medalists
1st place, gold medalist(s)		Dick Button; United States
2nd place, silver medalist(s)		Hans Gerschwiler; Switzerland
3rd place, bronze medalist(s)		Edi Rada; Austria

The men's individual skating event was held as part of the figure skating at the 1948 Winter Olympics. It was the seventh appearance of the event, which had previously been held twice at the Summer Olympics in 1908 and 1920 and at all four Winter Games from 1924 onward. The competition was held from 2 to 5 February 1948. Sixteen figure skaters from ten nations competed.

== Results ==
Rank	Name	Nation	CF		FS	Total points	Places
1	Dick Button	United States	1	994.7	1	191.177	10
2	Hans Gerschwiler	Switzerland	2	965.1	3	181.122	23
3	Edi Rada	Austria	3	941.0	4	178.133	33
4	John Lettengarver	United States	4	916.3	2	176.400	36
5	Ede Király	Hungary	5	922.1	5	174.400	42
6	James Grogan	United States	9	867.4	6	168.711	62
7	Graham Sharp	Great Britain	6	909.8	8	167.044	67
8	Hellmut May	Austria	7	893.2	7	165.666	68
9	Hellmut Seibt	Austria	8	882.9	12	162.655	79
10	Ladislav Čáp	Czechoslovakia	10	859.0	11	160.233	96
11	Fernand Leemans	Belgium	11	838.0	14	157.822	104
12	Wallace Diestelmeyer	Canada	13	809.1	9	156.322	110
13	Zdeněk Fikar	Czechoslovakia	12	819.0	13	154.155	114
14	Karl Enderlin	Switzerland	14	796.7	10	154.244	110
15	Carlo Fassi	Italy	16	764.9	15	145.966	135
16	Per Cock-Clausen	Denmark	15	785.5	16	145.533	135

Referee:

- (Switzerland) Henri Mügeli

Assistant Referee:

- (Switzerland) Eugen Kirchhofer

Judges:

- (United Kingdom) Kenneth M. Beaumont
- (Switzerland) Emile Finsterwald
- (United States) M. Bernard Fox
- (Czechoslovakia) Vladimír Koudelka
- (Austria) Ernst Labin
- (Belgium) Marcel Nicaise
- (Canada) Melville F. Rogers
- (Denmark) Sven P. Sørensen
- (Hungary) Elemér Terták
- (Italy) Bruno Bonfiglio (substitute)
