= 1949 European Figure Skating Championships =

Figure skating competition

1949 European Championships
- Type: ISU Championship
- Date: January 28 – 30
- Season: 1948–49
- Location: Milan, Italy

Champions
- Men's singles: (Austria) Edi Rada
- Ladies' singles: (Austria) Eva Pawlik
- Pairs: (Hungary) Andrea Kékesy / Ede Király
- Previous: 1948 European Championships
- Next: 1950 European Championships

The 1949 European Figure Skating Championships were held in Milan, Italy from January 28 to 30. Elite senior-level figure skaters from European ISU member nations competed for the title of European Champion in the disciplines of men's singles, ladies' singles, and pair skating.

Austrian skater Eva Pawlik who had also been the best European lady skater at the 1948 European Championship won the title only in 1949, because North Americans had been admitted in 1948. So under modern rules Pawlik would have been a two-time European Champion.

== Results ==
=== Men ===
Rank	Name	Places
1	(Austria) Edi Rada	
2	(Hungary) Ede Király	9
3	(Austria) Helmut Seibt	
4	(Italy) Carlo Fassi	
5	(Czechoslovakia) Vladislav Čáp	
6	(Czechoslovakia) Zdeněk Fikar	

=== Ladies ===
Rank	Name	Places
1	(Austria) Eva Pawlik	
2	(Czechoslovakia) Alena Vrzáňová	
3	(United Kingdom) Jeannette Altwegg	
4	(Czechoslovakia) Jiřina Nekolová	
5	(Czechoslovakia) Dagmar Lerchová	
6	(United Kingdom) Bridget Adams	
7	(France) Jacqueline du Bief	
8	(United Kingdom) Barbara Wyatt	
9	(United Kingdom) Valda Osborn	
10	(Hungary) Andrea Kékesy	
11	(Austria) Lilly Fuchs	
12	(United Kingdom) Beryl Bailey	
13	(United Kingdom) Joan Lister	
14	(Austria) Susi Giebisch	
15	(Austria) Helga Haid	
16	(Italy) Grazia Barcellona	

=== Pairs ===
Rank	Name	Places
1	(Hungary) Andrea Kékesy / Ede Király	8
2	(Hungary) Marianna Nagy / László Nagy	21
3	(Austria) Herta Ratzenhofer / Emil Ratzenhofer	
4	(Czechoslovakia) Běla Zachova / Jaroslav Zach	
5	(Belgium) Suzanne Gheldolf / Jacques Rénard	
6	(United Kingdom) Jennifer Nicks / John Nicks	
7	(Norway) Margot Walle / Allan Fjeldheim	
8	(Austria) Elly Stärck / Harry Gareis	
9	(Italy) Grazia Barcellona / Carlo Fassi	
10	(Switzerland) Eliane Steinemann / André Calame	
11	(United Kingdom) Pamela Davis / Peter Scholes	
12	(Socialist Federal Republic of Yugoslavia) Silva Palme / Marko Lajović	
