= 1947 World Figure Skating Championships =

Annual figure skating competition held in 1947

- Type: ISU Championship
- Date: February 13 – 17
- Season: 1947
- Location: Stockholm, Sweden

Champions
- Men's singles: (Switzerland) Hans Gerschwiler
- Ladies' singles: (Canada) Barbara Ann Scott
- Pairs: (Belgium) Micheline Lannoy / Pierre Baugniet
- Previous: 1939 World Championships
- Next: 1948 World Championships

The World Figure Skating Championships is an annual figure skating competition sanctioned by the International Skating Union in which figure skaters compete for the title of World Champion. The 1947 competitions for men, ladies, and pair skating took place from February 13 to 17 in Stockholm, Sweden. These were the first World Figure Skating Championships after World War II. Skaters from Germany, Austria, and Japan were not allowed to compete. It was the first time skaters from Australia competed at Worlds.

== Medal table ==
* Host nation (Sweden)

Rank	Nation	Gold	Silver	Bronze	Total
1	Belgium	1	0	1	2
2	Canada	1	0	0	1
2	Switzerland	1	0	0	1
4	United States	0	2	1	3
5	Great Britain	0	1	1	2
Totals (5 entries)		3	3	3	9

== Results ==
=== Men ===
Rank	Name	Places
1	(Switzerland) Hans Gerschwiler	7
2	(United States) Dick Button	8
3	(United Kingdom) Arthur Apfel	16
4	(Czechoslovakia) Vladislav Čáp	20
5	(Denmark) Per Cock-Clausen	24

Judges:

- (Czechoslovakia) J. Bizek
- (United Kingdom) Hubert Martineau
- (Denmark) P. Sørensen
- (United States) Lyman Wakefield
- (Switzerland) A. Winkler

=== Ladies ===
Rank	Name	Places
1	(Canada) Barbara Ann Scott	10
2	(United Kingdom) Daphne Walker	22
3	(United States) Gretchen Merrill	32
4	(United States) Eileen Seigh	50
5	(United Kingdom) Jeanette Altwegg	53
6	(United States) Janette Ahrens	58
7	(Czechoslovakia) Alena Vrzáňová	61
8	(United Kingdom) Bridget Shirley Adams	71
9	(Sweden) Britta Råhlén	72
10	(Czechoslovakia) Jiřína Nekolová	80
11	(United Kingdom) Jill Linzee	88
12	(Australia) Patricia Molony	109
13	(Sweden) Gun Ericson	116
14	(Norway) Liv Borg	124
15	(Norway) Ingeborg Nilsson	138
16	(Finland) Leena Pietilä	143
17	(Finland) Kristi Linna	159
18	(Finland) Liisa Helanterä	160
19	(Finland) Harriet Pantanenius	164

Judges:

- (Norway) B. Børjeson
- (United Kingdom) Herbert Clarke
- (Canada) Donald Cruikshank
- (Czechoslovakia) J. Hainz
- (Finland) Walter Jakobsson
- (Australia) C. F. MacGillicuddy
- (Sweden) Thore Mothander
- (Denmark) P. Sørensen
- (United States) Lyman Wakefield

=== Pairs ===
Rank	Name	Places
1	(Belgium) Micheline Lannoy / Pierre Baugniet	16
2	(United States) Karol Kennedy / Peter Kennedy	19.5
3	(Belgium) Suzanne Diskeuve / Edmond Verbustel	25.5
4	(United Kingdom) Winifred Silverthorne / Dennis Silverthorne	25.5
5	(Sweden) Britta Råhlén / Bo Mothander	38
6	(United States) Doris Noffke / Walter Noffke	43.5
7	(France) Denise Fayolle / Guy Pigier	48
8	(Czechoslovakia) Běla Zachova / Jaroslav Zach	52
9	(Norway) Margot Walle / Allan Fjeldheim	58
10	(France) Denise Favart / Jacques Favart	59.5
11	(Norway) Marit Henie / Erling Bjerkhoel	76.5

Judges:

- (Norway) Christen Christensen
- (Czechoslovakia) J. Hainz
- (United Kingdom) Hubert Martineau
- (Belgium) M. Nicaise
- (France) Georges Torchon
- (Sweden) Einar Törsleff
- (United States) Lyman Wakefield
