= Gerschwiler =

Gerschwiler is a surname. Notable people with the surname include:

- Arnold Gerschwiler (1914–2003), Swiss/British figure skating coach, uncle of Hans
- Hans Gerschwiler (1920–2017), Swiss figure skater
- Jacques Gerschwiler (1898–2000), Swiss figure skater and coach, half-brother of Arnold and uncle of Hans
