= Jill Hood-Linzee =

British figure skater (1928–2007)

Personal information
- Nationality: British
- Born: 18 October 1928 Surbiton, England
- Died: 17 June 2007 (aged 78) Edenbridge, England

Sport
- Sport: Figure skating

Jill Hood-Linzee (18 October 1928 – 17 June 2007) was a British figure skater. She competed in the ladies' singles event at the 1948 Winter Olympics.

== Career ==
Shortly after the end of World War II, Hood-Linzee finished fourth at the 1945 British Amateur Ice Skating Championship, and two years later she placed third. She competed at the 1947 and 1948 World Championships and at the 1947 European Championships in Davos, where her tenth place was her best international result. She was unable to compete at the 1948 European Championships shortly before the Olympics, but she took part in the ladies' singles at the 1948 Winter Olympics in St. Moritz, finishing 19th.
