= Barbara Ann Scott =

Canadian figure skater (1928–2012)

Barbara Ann Scott OC OOnt
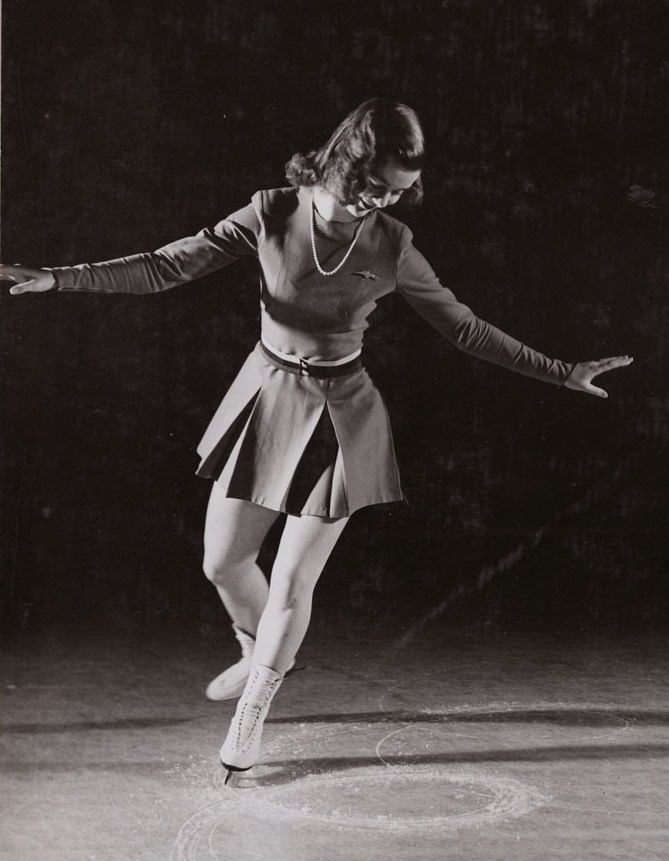
- Scott in March 1946

Personal information
- Born: May 9, 1928 Ottawa, Ontario, Canada
- Died: September 30, 2012 (aged 84) Fernandina Beach, Amelia Island, Nassau County, Florida, U.S.
- Height: 5 ft 2 in (157 cm)
- Spouse: Thomas Van Dyke King (m. 1955)

Figure skating career
- Country: Canada
- Retired: 1948
Medal record
Women's figure skating
Representing Canada
Olympic Games
Gold medal – first place	1948 St. Moritz	Singles
World Championships
Gold medal – first place	1948 Davos	Singles
Gold medal – first place	1947 Stockholm	Singles
European Championships
Gold medal – first place	1948 Prague	Singles
Gold medal – first place	1947 Davos	Singles
North American Championships
Gold medal – first place	1947 Ottawa	Singles
Gold medal – first place	1945 New York	Singles

Barbara Ann Scott OC OOnt (May 9, 1928 – September 30, 2012) was a Canadian figure skater. She was the 1948 Olympic champion, a two-time World champion (1947–1948), and a four-time Canadian national champion (1944–46, 1948) in ladies' singles. Known as "Canada's Sweetheart", she is the only Canadian to have won the Olympic ladies' singles gold medal, the first North American to have won three major titles in one year and the only Canadian to have won the European Championship (1947–48). During her forties, she was rated among the top equestrians in North America. She received many honours and accolades, including being made an Officer of the Order of Canada in 1991 and a member of the Order of Ontario in 2008.

== Life and career ==
Scott was born on May 9, 1928, the only child of Canadian Army Colonel Clyde Rutherford Scott and Mary (née Purves) of Sandy Hill, Ottawa. She had two older half-siblings, from her mother's first marriage.

Scott began skating at the age of seven at the Minto Skating Club, coached by Otto Gold and Sheldon Galbraith. At age nine, Scott switched from regular schooling to tutoring two-and-a-half hours a day in order to accommodate her seven hours of daily ice training. At the age of ten she became the youngest skater ever to pass the "gold figures test" and at eleven years won her first national junior title. By the age of fifteen, Scott became Canada's senior national champion, she held the Canadian Figure Skating championship title from 1944 to 1946.

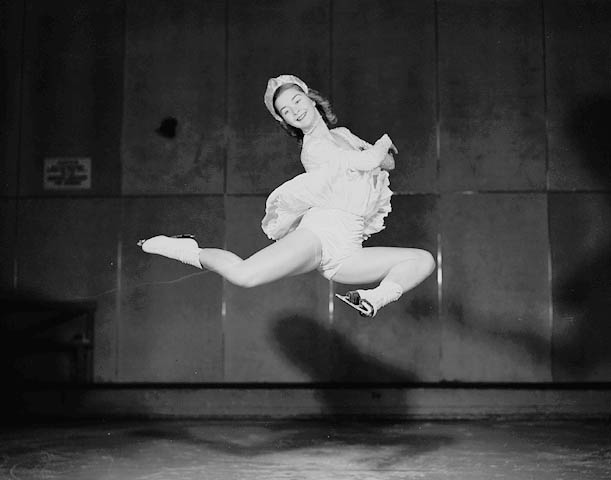
Barbara Ann Scott - Dec 1947

In 1947, with funding raised by the community, Scott traveled overseas and became the first North American to win both the European and World Figure Skating championships, and remains the only Canadian to have won the European title. This led to her being voted Canadian Newsmaker of the Year in 1947. On her return to Ottawa during a parade she was given a yellow Buick convertible (license plate: 47-U-1); however it had to be returned for her to retain amateur status, to be eligible for the 1948 Winter Olympics.

During the 1948 season, Scott was able to defend both the World Figure Skating and the European Skating Championships, and reacquired the Canadian Figure Skating Championship, becoming the first North American to win all three in the same year and the first to hold consecutive world titles. She was featured on the cover of Time magazine on February 2, 1948, one week before her Olympic debut in St. Moritz, Switzerland.

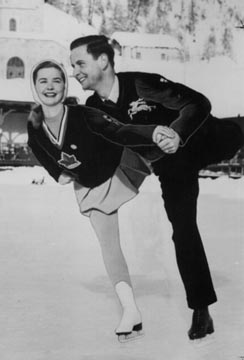
Barbara Ann Scott and Hans Gerschwiler practice together before the 1948 Winter Olympics. Both went on to win medals - Scott gold and Gerschweiler silver.

At the 1948 Winter Olympics, Scott became the first and only Canadian in history to win the ladies' singles figure skating gold medal. After the Olympic win she received a telegram from Prime Minister Mackenzie King, stating that she gave "Canadians courage to get through the darkness of the post-war gloom." When Scott returned to Ottawa on March 9, 1948, the car that she originally relinquished in 1947 was given back (license plate now: 48-U-1), and she also received the "Key" to the city. She was commonly referred to as "Canada's Sweetheart" in the press at this time, so much so that a collectible doll (accompanied by a letter from her) was issued in her honour in 1948. According to figure skating writer and historian Ellyn Kestnbaum, Scott "brought polish, glamour, and feminine delicateness" to figure skating. She was described as "a cover girl", inspiring Canadian girls to become skaters. She was also one of the first skaters to specifically choreograph and to musically interpret her free skating programs, instead of using music as a background accompaniment.

Scott officially relinquished her amateur status in the summer of 1948 and began touring North America and Europe, headlining in a variety of shows over the next five years. Among her early successes was Tom Arnold's Rose Marie on Ice at the Harringay Arena in London, UK. She went on to replace her childhood idol Sonja Henie in the starring role with the "Hollywood Ice Revue" in Chicago, which became the subject of a Life cover story on February 4, 1952. The grueling schedule of a professional skater took its toll, and at the age of twenty-five she retired from professional skating.

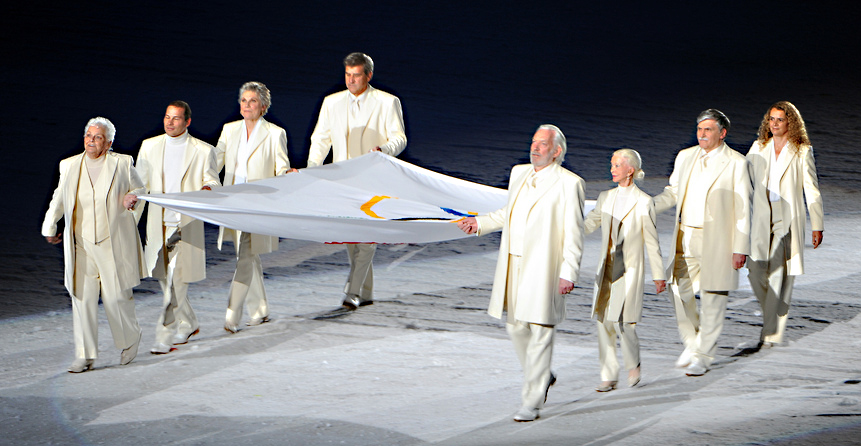
Opening Ceremony of the XXI Olympic Winter Games - Left to right carrying the flag, Betty Fox, Jacques Villeneuve, Anne Murray, Bobby Orr, Donald Sutherland, Barbara Ann Scott-King, Lt. Gen. Romeo Dallaire, Julie Payette.

In 1955, aged 27, she married publicist and former professional basketball player Tom King at Rosedale Presbyterian Church in Toronto. The couple settled in Chicago, where she opened a beauty salon for a short time, then became a distinguished horse trainer and equestrian rider by her forties. During this time, Scott founded and became chancellor of the International Academy of Merchandising and Design in Toronto. In 1996, the couple retired to Amelia Island, Florida. She remained an influential figure in skating throughout her life; she appeared in films and TV, published books, served as a skating judge, and was formally recognized for her educational and charitable causes including donating a percentage of her earnings to aid crippled children.

External videos
- " Barbara Ann Scott opens her gallery at Ottawa City Hall" – VideoManOttawa -YouTube(7:11 min)

As a Canadian sports icon and marking the fortieth anniversary of her Olympic win, she was asked to carry the Olympic torch in the lead-up to the 1988 Winter Olympic Games in Calgary. In December 2009, she again carried the Olympic torch, this time to Parliament Hill and into the House of Commons, in anticipation of the 2010 Winter Olympics. She subsequently was one of the Olympic flag bearers during the opening ceremonies in Vancouver on February 12, 2010. In 2012, the city of Ottawa announced the creation of the Barbara Ann Scott Gallery, which displays photographs, her championship awards, and the Olympic gold medal that Scott formally donated to the city in 2011.

Scott died on September 30, 2012, at her home in Fernandina Beach, Amelia Island, Florida at age 84. Her obituary listed her name as Barbara Ann Scott King. A local arena was named after her in Nepean, Ontario, as part of the Pinecrest Recreation Centre.

== Orders, accolades and medals ==
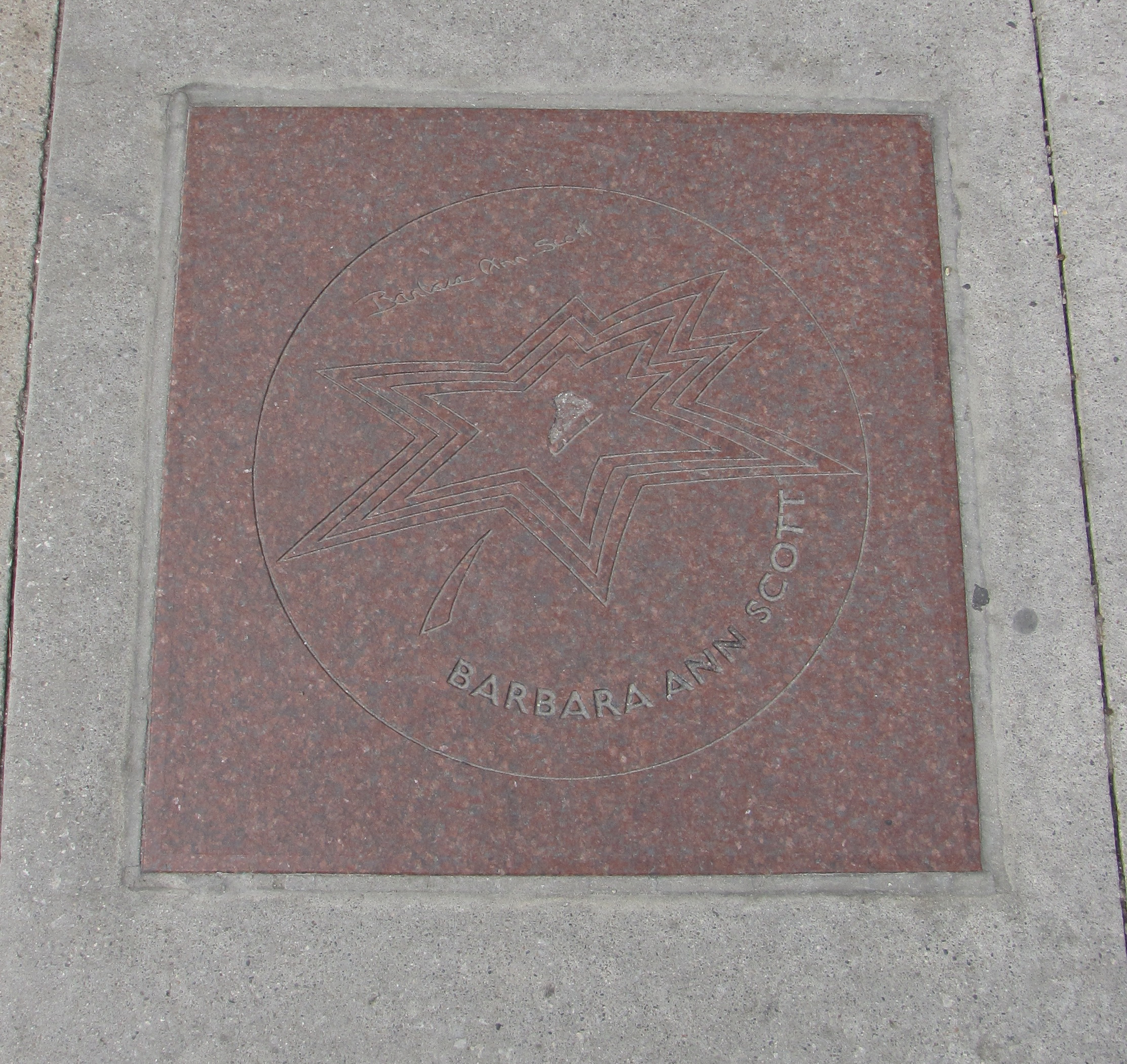
Barbara Ann Scott's star on Canada's Walk of Fame

Scott was made an Officer of the Order of Canada in 1991 (OC), and a Member of the Order of Ontario (OOnt) in 2008 for her contributions to sports and charitable endeavours.

She was inducted into the Canadian Olympic Hall of Fame in 1948, Canada's Sports Hall of Fame in 1955, the Ottawa Sports Hall of Fame in 1966, the Skate Canada Hall of Fame in 1991, the International Women's Sports Hall of Fame in 1997, the Ontario Sports Hall of Fame in 1997, and in 1998 was named to Canada's Walk of Fame. The Barbara Ann Scott Ice Trail at Toronto's College Park is named after the skater.

Her first major honour came in the form of the Lou Marsh Trophy as Canada's Top Athlete of the Year in 1945, which she subsequently won in both 1947 and 1948.

Event	1940	1941	1942	1944	1945	1946	1947	1948
Winter Olympics								1st
World Championships							1st	1st
European Championships							1st	1st
North American Championships		6th			1st		1st	
Canadian Championships	1st J	2nd	2nd	1st	1st	1st		1st

== Bibliography ==
- Cay Moore (1948). She Skated Into Our Hearts: The Story of Barbara ann Scott. McClelland & Stewart Ltd.
- Barbara Ann Scott (1952). Skate with me. A. Redman.
- Barbara Ann Scott; Michael Kirby (1953). Skating for beginners (1 ed.). Knopf.
- Ryan Stevens (2025). Barbara Ann Scott: Queen of the Ice. R. Stevens.

== Filmography ==
Year	Title	Role	Topic
1947	Johnny at the Fair (Short film)	Herself	A boy is separated from his mother and father and meets celebrities on his journey. - This short film was later featured in a Season 4 episode of Mystery Science Theater 3000.
1948	An Introduction to the Art of Figure Skating (Short film)	Herself	Barbara Ann Scott demonstrates her unique style of figure skating
1949	Beauty and the Blade (Short film)	Herself	Dick Button and Barbara Ann Scott demonstrate six types of skating
1950	Hollywood Ice Capades premiere (Short film)	Herself	Many skating stars together
1955	What's My Line? (TV series)	Herself	Appears as a mystery guest – original air date: April 17, 1955
1956	Happy New Year "Sunday Spectacular" (TV movie)	Herself	Ice ballets by Barbara Ann Scott and Dick Button
1984	You've Come a Long Way, Ladies (TV movie)	Herself	Documenting the great achievements of women in the 20th century
1997	Queen of the Blades: Life & Times of Barbara Ann Scott (TV series)	Herself	A biography of Barbara Ann Scott - original air date: March 12, 1997
1999	Reflections on Ice Synopsis (TV series)	Herself	Documentary on women's figure skating

== See also ==
- Canada at the 1948 Winter Olympics
- Petra Burka
- Karen Magnussen
- Elizabeth Manley
- Kaetlyn Osmond
- Joannie Rochette
- Marilyn Ruth Take
