= Micheline Lannoy =

Belgian figure skater (1925–2023)

- Lannoy in 1947

Personal information
- Full name: Micheline Lannoy
- Born: 31 January 1925 Brussels, Belgium
- Died: 18 March 2023 (aged 98)

Figure skating career
- Country: Belgium
Medal record
Representing Belgium
Pairs Figure skating
Olympic Games
Gold medal – first place	1948 St. Mortiz	Pairs
World Championships
Gold medal – first place	1948 Davos	Pairs
Gold medal – first place	1947 Stockholm	Pairs
European Championships
Gold medal – first place	1947 Davos	Pairs

Micheline Lannoy (31 January 1925 – 18 March 2023) was a Belgian pair skater. With partner Pierre Baugniet, she was the 1948 Olympic champion, the 1947 and 1948 World Champion, and the 1947 European champion. Their win at the 1948 Olympics was the first, and up until the 2022 Winter Olympics only, Winter Olympic gold medal for Belgium. She was born in Brussels on 31 January 1925, and died on 18 March 2023, at the age of 98.

== Results ==
(pairs with Pierre Baugniet)

Event	1944	1945	1946	1947	1948
Winter Olympic Games					1st
World Championships				1st	1st
European Championships				1st	
Belgian Championships	1st	1st	1st	1st	

== Sources ==
- Evans, Hilary; Gjerde, Arild; Heijmans, Jeroen; Mallon, Bill; et al. "Micheline Lannoy". Olympics at Sports-Reference.com. Sports Reference LLC. Archived from the original on 18 April 2020.
- "World Figure Skating Championships Results: Pairs Medalists" (PDF). International Skating Union. Archived from the original (PDF) on 5 December 2013.
- "European Figure Skating Championships Results: Pairs Medalists" (PDF). International Skating Union. Archived from the original (PDF) on 12 April 2007.
