= Martha Bachem =

Austrian-German figure skater

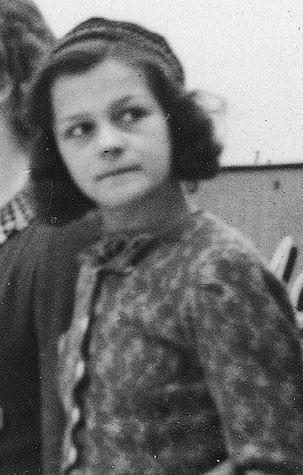
- Bachem at the 1939 World Figure Skating Championships

Personal information
- Other names: Marta Musilek
- Born: 8 June 1924 Vienna
- Died: 29 May 2015 (aged 90)

Figure skating career
- Country: Austria; Germany
- Coach: Karl Schäfer
- Skating club: VK Engelmann Wien; Wiener EG
- Retired: c. 1948

Martha Bachem (née Musilek; 8 June 1924 – 29 May 2015) was an Austrian-German figure skater. She became a three-time German national champion before representing Austria at the 1948 Winter Olympics.

== Life and career ==
Musilek was born on 8 June 1924 in Vienna, Austria. She belonged to VK Engelmann Wien and Wiener EG. Karl Schäfer served as her coach.

Having become a German citizen due to the Anschluss of Austria, Musilek began her international career skating for Germany. She placed 9th at the 1939 European Championships in Davos, Switzerland, and 7th at the 1939 World Championships in Prague, Czechoslovakia.

Due to World War II, no ISU Championships were held during the following years. Musilek competed at national events, winning German and Austrian titles. In 1944, she married Hans Erich Bachem from Cologne. She missed the 1946–1947 season, having recently given birth, but resumed skating the following season.

As Germany was barred from the 1948 Winter Olympics, she arranged for the Austrian Repatriation Commission in Munich to send her back to her birth country. Representing Austria, she placed 11th at the 1948 European Championships in Prague, Czechoslovakia; 9th at the Olympics in St. Moritz, Switzerland; and 7th at the 1948 World Championships in Davos, Switzerland.

Later in 1948, Austria expelled her to Germany because she had not fulfilled the requirements for Austrian repatriation, i.e. divorcing her German husband.

== Competitive highlights ==
International
Event	1939	1940	1941	1942	1943	1944	1948
Winter Olympics							9th
World Championships	7th						7th
European Championships	9th						11th
National
German Championships	3rd	3rd	2nd	1st	1st	1st	
Austrian Championships			2nd	1st	1st		
