= Suzanne Diskeuve =

Belgian figure skater

Figure skating career
- Country: Belgium
Medal record
Representing Belgium
Figure skating: Pairs
World Championships
Bronze medal – third place	1947 Stockholm	Pairs
European Championships
Bronze medal – third place	1947 Davos	Pairs

Suzanne Diskeuve is a Belgian figure skater who competed in pair skating.

With partner Edmond Verbustel, in 1947 she won bronze medals at both the European Figure Skating Championships (in Davos) and the World Figure Skating Championships (in Stockholm).

== Competitive highlights ==
With Edmond Verbustel

Event	1947
World Championships	3rd
European Championships	3rd
