= Eva Pawlik =

Austrian figure skater, actress, commentator (1927–1983)

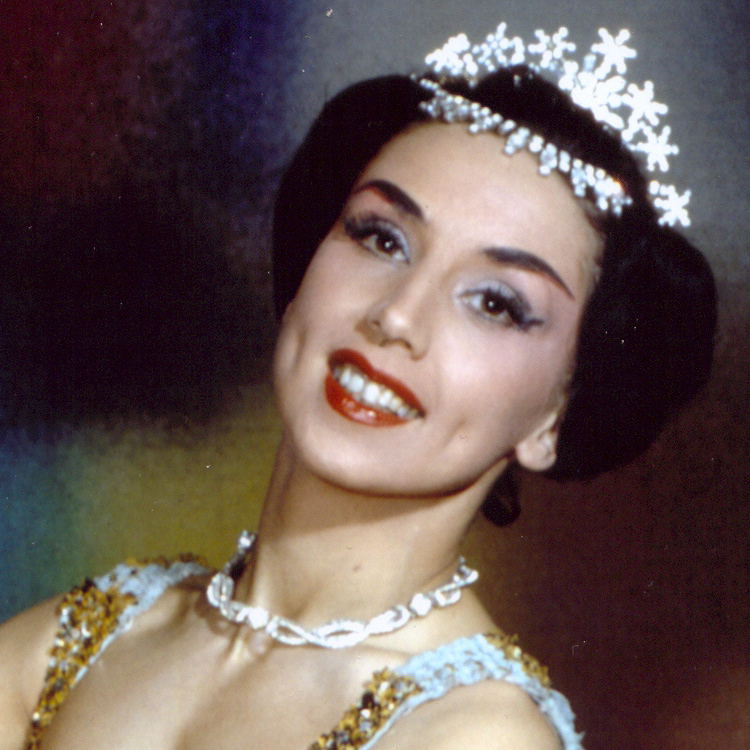
- Pawlik in 1958

Personal information
- Born: 4 October 1927 Vienna, Austria
- Died: 31 July 1983 (aged 55) Vienna, Austria

Figure skating career
- Country: Austria
- Skating club: Vienna Skating Club
- Retired: 1949
Medal record
Representing Austria
Ladies' Figure skating
Olympic Games
Silver medal – second place	1948 St. Moritz	Ladies' singles
World Championships
Silver medal – second place	1948 Davos	Ladies' singles
European Championships
Gold medal – first place	1949 Milan	Ladies' singles
Silver medal – second place	1948 Prague	Ladies' singles

Eva Pawlik (4 October 1927 – 31 July 1983) was an Austrian figure skater, show star, actress and commentator. She was the 1948 Olympic silver medalist, the 1948 World silver medalist, and the 1949 European champion.

== Early life ==
Born in 1927, Pawlik was regarded as a child prodigy, able to jump a single Axel and do a large number of spins at the age of four. Before World War II, she was considered an "exceptionally promising 9-year-old Viennese" figure skater in the United States. In Europe, she starred in "The Fairy Tale Of The Steady Tin Soldier" together with World champion Felix Kaspar. This legendary vaudeville number was internationally highly successful, being performed in Vienna, Prague, Budapest, Munich, Bern, Amsterdam, Brussels, Lyon, Paris and London. Pawlik was called the "Shirley Temple on ice". In her teens she would get up at 4 a.m. daily to run to the Vienna ice rink (Wiener Eislaufverein), for practice before going to school. Austrian skaters were impeded in the 1930s and 40s by the fact that there were no indoor skating halls and they were restricted to practicing in winter.

== Competitive career ==
Pawlik's coaches included the 1914 World silver medalist Angela Hanka, World champion Gustav Hügel, Rudolf Kutzer and Edi Scholdan.

Pawlik was due to compete (aged 11) in the 1940 Winter Olympics. However, following Nazi Germany's absorption of Austria in 1938 and the onset of World War II, she and her pairs partner, Rudi Seeliger, could only take part in domestic competitions. They became German youth champions, both individually and as a pair team. In addition to that, they became the 1942 Austrian pairs champions (called Ostmark champions at that time due to the fact that Austria did not exist from 1938 to 1945). Drafted into the German Army, Seeliger was captured by the Red Army and returned to Austria in 1949.

=== 1948 season ===
Beginning in 1948, Austrians were again allowed to compete internationally. Pawlik won three silver medals; at the Europeans, at the Olympics and at Worlds. She entered the 1948 European Championships as the favorite. Nevertheless, she finished second to non-European Barbara Ann Scott from Canada. At the time, skaters from non-European countries could compete at the European Championships. In Sandra Stevenson's opinion, it was "not surprising that North Americans, whose skating activities had not been interrupted" during World War II, "should do well when the sport resumed in 1947. When Eva Pawlik of Austria unsuccessfully challenged Barbara Ann Scott in 1948 one reason given for her failure was that she skated with dirty boots and holes in her tights. The boots were so old that they no longer responded to cleaning and the holes were darned. It was the best she could manage with all the shortages in her country."

In 1948, Pawlik performed in exhibition skating in the United States. She appeared together with U.S. Champion Gretchen Merrill in the Broadmoor Ice Revue, produced by Edi Scholdan in Colorado Springs. She was also asked to appear in a movie starring Gene Kelly. He wanted to combine his dancing with her skating. She declined, as turning professional would have excluded her from the 1949 championships.

=== 1949 season ===
In 1949, despite suffering acute appendicitis, Pawlik beat her rival Aja Zanova in Milan to become European champion. In the World Championships held in Paris, Pawlik was lying a close second behind Zanova when one of the heels on her skates broke. Sabotage was suspected, but never proven. The judges did not allow her to continue with borrowed skates and Zanova went on to win. Though she had a good chance to win the World title one year later, Pawlik decided to turn professional because her parents needed financial support.

== Professional career ==
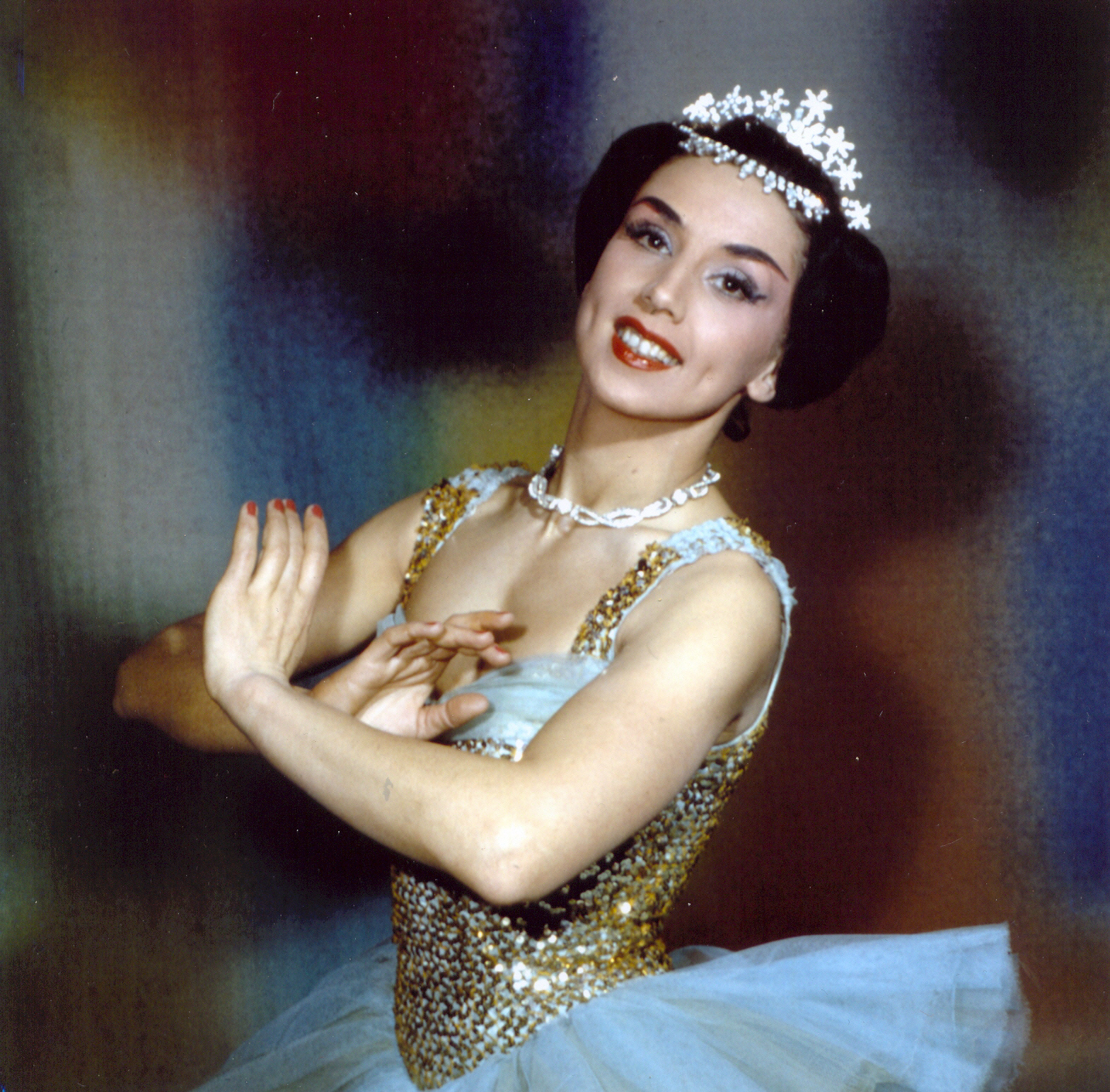
Pawlik starring in the Vienna Ice Revue in 1958

Pawlik joined the Vienna Ice Revue, and she also played major parts in the productions of two movies featuring the Revue, Spring On The Ice (Frühling auf dem Eis), 1950, and Revue Of Dreams (Traumrevue), 1959. During the Allied occupation of Austria, the Viennese film studios were located in the Soviet sector, which is why the film "Springtime On Ice" was dubbed into Russian, among other languages. This allowed the later Olympic Double Champion Ludmila Belousova to see the film. "Spring on Ice," starring Eva Pawlik, inspired Ludmilla to take up skating.

In 1952, Robert Stolz dedicated his first ice operetta, Eternal Eve (Die ewige Eva), to Eva Pawlik. Morris Chalfen, the boss of the competitor enterprise Holiday On Ice, considered Pawlik Europe's best show star on the ice since the thrice Olympic champion Sonja Henie. Additionally, Pawlik and Seeliger had become one of the world's best professional pair teams. They left the Vienna Ice Revue in 1954 and starred in Hanns Thelen's Scala Eisrevue for some years. In 1958, they returned to the Vienna Ice Revue. Their performances in ice shows were important in stimulating interest in figure skating at a time when it was still uncommon for European audiences to see it on television.

== Later life ==
She married Rudi Seeliger in 1957 and had a son, Roman, in 1962.

In 1961, Pawlik retired from skating and became the first European and the world's first female figure skater to become a TV figure skating commentator. She commentated all European and World Championships in figure skating and the 1964, 1968 and 1972 Olympic Games for the Austrian Broadcasting Corporation (ORF).

In 1973, she began her third profession as a teacher of German and English at a Viennese secondary school (pupils from 10 to 18). In 1954, she earned her doctorate in German and English at the University of Vienna. Eva Pawlik the first woman in the history of the University of Vienna to speak the Latin words of gratitude representatively for all candidates in an academic ceremony in which doctor's degrees were awarded. By then, those words were always spoken by men ("Pro collato honore et dignitate gradus gratias innumeras agimus“ which means „We are very grateful for the awarded honor and dignity of the academic degree.“) In 1979, Pawlik became severely ill and died in 1983, four months after her husband.

== Legacy ==
The exhibition "The Vienna Ice Revue. Austria's ambassador of the past" took place at the Bezirksmuseum Wien-Meidling from January to March 2008.

== Results ==
=== Ladies' singles ===
International
Event	1946	1947	1948	1949
Winter Olympics			2nd	
World Championships			2nd	WD
European Championships			2nd	1st
National
Austrian Championships	1st	1st	1st	1st
WD = Withdrew

=== Pairs with Seeliger ===
National
Event	1942
Austrian Championships	1st

== Filmography ==
Year	Title	Role
1937	Sunny Youth (Sonnige Jugend)	Herself (actress and skater)
1950	Spring on Ice (Frühling auf dem Eis)	Eva (actress and skater)
1959	Revue Of Dreams (Traumrevue)	Ilona Karoly (actress and skater)
1962	Three Love Letters From The Tyrol (Drei Liebesbriefe aus Tirol)	Skater
