= Andrea Kékesy =

Hungarian figure skater (1926–2024)

Personal information
- Born: 17 September 1926 Budapest, Hungary
- Died: 21 November 2024 (aged 98) Ottawa, Canada

Figure skating career
- Country: Hungary
- Partner: Ede Király
- Retired: 1949
Medal record
Representing Hungary
Figure skating: Pairs
Olympic Games
Silver medal – second place	1948 St. Moritz	Pairs
World Championships
Gold medal – first place	1949 Paris	Pairs
Silver medal – second place	1948 Davos	Pairs
European Championships
Gold medal – first place	1949 Milan	Pairs
Gold medal – first place	1948 Prague	Pairs

Andrea Kékesy, later Bernolák (17 September 1926 – 21 November 2024) was a Hungarian pair skater. She was born in Budapest. With her skating partner, Ede Király, she became the 1948 Olympic silver medalist, the 1949 World champion, and a two-time European champion (1948–1949).

Born on 17 September 1926, Kékesy died in November 2024, at the age of 98.

== Results ==
=== Pairs with Király ===
International
Event	1944	1947	1948	1949
Winter Olympics			2nd	
World Championships			2nd	1st
European Championships			1st	1st
National
Hungarian Championships	1st	1st	1st	1st

=== Ladies' singles ===
International
Event	1948	1949
World Championships	9th	
European Championships	7th	10th
