= Pierre Baugniet =

Belgian figure skater

- Baugniet in 1947

Personal information
- Full name: Pierre Baugniet
- Born: 23 July 1925 Antwerp
- Died: 20 December 1981 (aged 56)

Figure skating career
- Country: Belgium
- Retired: 1948
Medal record
Representing Belgium
Pairs Figure skating
Olympic Games
Gold medal – first place	1948 St. Mortiz	Pairs
World Championships
Gold medal – first place	1948 Davos	Pairs
Gold medal – first place	1947 Stockholm	Pairs
European Championships
Gold medal – first place	1947 Davos	Pairs

Pierre Baugniet (23 July 1925 – 20 December 1981) was a Belgian pair skater. With partner Micheline Lannoy, he was the 1948 Olympic champion, the 1947 & 1948 World Champion, and the 1947 European champion.

Their win at the 1948 Olympics was the first and until 2022 only Winter Olympic gold medal for Belgium.

== Results ==
(pairs with Micheline Lannoy)

Event	1944	1945	1946	1947	1948
Winter Olympic Games					1st
World Championships				1st	1st
European Championships				1st	
Belgian Championships	1st	1st	1st	1st	
