= Dick Button =

American figure skater (1929–2025)

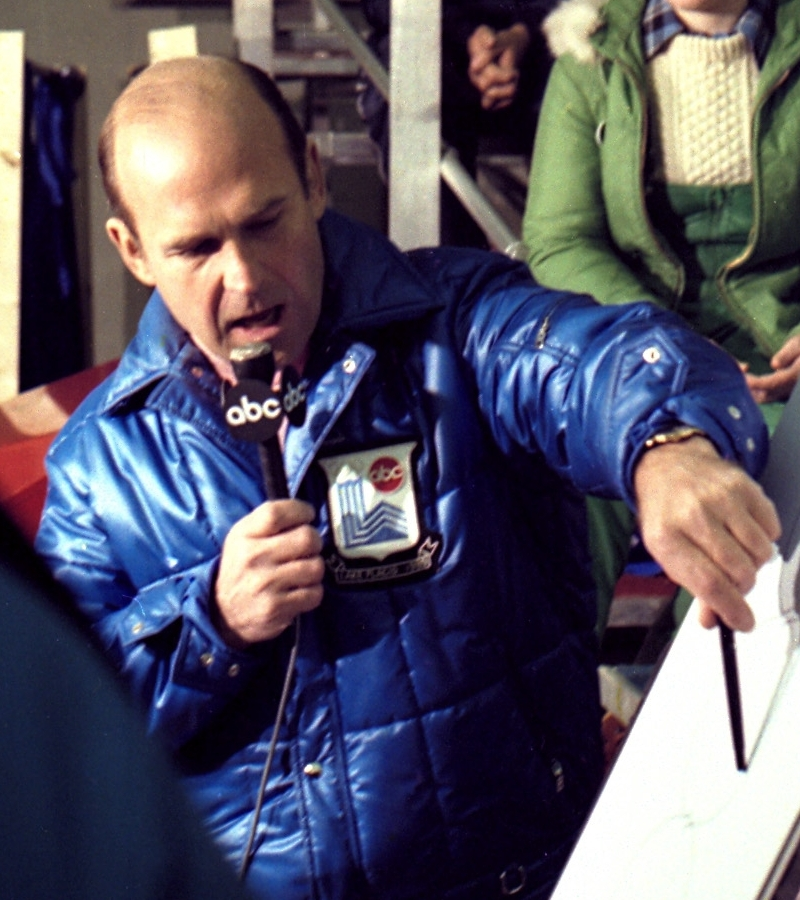
- Button as a commentator at the 1980 Winter Olympics in Lake Placid

Personal information
- Full name: Richard Totten Button
- Born: July 18, 1929 Englewood, New Jersey, U.S.
- Died: January 30, 2025 (aged 95) North Salem, New York, U.S.

Figure skating career
- Country: United States
- Discipline: Men's singles
- Skating club: SC of Boston; Philadelphia SC & HS
- Retired: 1952
Medal record
Olympic Games
Gold medal – first place	1948 St. Moritz	Men's singles
Gold medal – first place	1952 Oslo	Men's singles
World Championships
Gold medal – first place	1948 Davos	Men's singles
Gold medal – first place	1949 Paris	Men's singles
Gold medal – first place	1950 London	Men's singles
Gold medal – first place	1951 Milan	Men's singles
Gold medal – first place	1952 Paris	Men's singles
Silver medal – second place	1947 Stockholm	Men's singles
European Championships
Gold medal – first place	1948 Prague	Men's singles
North American Championships
Gold medal – first place	1947 Ottawa	Men's singles
Gold medal – first place	1949 Philadelphia	Men's singles
Gold medal – first place	1951 Calgary	Men's singles
U.S. Championships
Gold medal – first place	1946 Chicago	Men's singles
Gold medal – first place	1947 Berkeley	Men's singles
Gold medal – first place	1948 Colorado Springs	Men's singles
Gold medal – first place	1949 Colorado Springs	Men's singles
Gold medal – first place	1950 Washington D.C.	Men's singles
Gold medal – first place	1951 Seattle	Men's singles
Gold medal – first place	1952 Colorado Springs	Men's singles

Richard Totten Button (July 18, 1929 – January 30, 2025) was an American figure skater and skating analyst. He was a two-time Olympic champion (1948, 1952) and five-time consecutive world champion (1948–1952). He was also the only non-European man to have become European champion. Button is credited as having been the first skater to successfully land the double Axel jump in competition in 1948, as well as the first triple jump of any kind – a triple loop – in 1952. He also invented the flying camel spin, which was originally known as the "Button camel". He "brought increased athleticism" to figure skating in the years following World War II. According to figure skating historian James R. Hines, Button represented the "American School" of figure skating, which was a more athletic style than skaters from Europe.

== Early life ==
Button was born on July 18, 1929, and raised in Englewood, New Jersey. He graduated in 1947 from the Englewood School for Boys (now Dwight-Englewood School). He began skating at an early age but did not begin training seriously until the age of 12, after his father overheard him being told he would never be a good skater. Button's father sent him to Lake Placid, New York, to train with coach Gus Lussi, who coached him throughout his competitive career.

== Career ==
=== Amateur ===
==== Early competitions ====
In his first competition, the 1943 Eastern States Novice Championship, Button finished second to Jean-Pierre Brunet. In 1944, he won the Eastern States junior title which earned him the opportunity to compete at the National Novice Championships. He won the event. In 1945, his third year of serious skating, he won the Eastern States senior title and the national junior title. He was also skating pairs, and competed with Barbara Jones in junior pairs at the 1946 Eastern States Championships. They performed Button's singles program side-by-side with minor modifications and won. This competition, where Button also competed as a single skater, led into the 1946 U.S. Championships. At age 16, Button won the 1946 U.S. Championships by a unanimous vote. According to Button, this was the first time anyone had won the men's novice, junior, and senior titles in three consecutive years. Button went on to win six more national championships (1947–1951), tying the record set by Roger Turner, who won seven U.S. Nationals between 1928 and 1934. This win earned Button a spot at the 1947 World Championships.

==== 1947 World Championships ====
At the 1947 World Championships, Button was second behind rival Hans Gerschwiler following the compulsory figures part of the competition, with 34.9 points separating them. He won the free skating portion, but Gerschwiler had the majority of first places from the judges, three to Button's two. Button won the silver medal at his first World Championships. It was the last time he placed lower than first in competition. At the competition, Button was befriended by Ulrich Salchow. Salchow, who was disappointed when Button did not win, presented him with the first International Cup Salchow had won in 1901. Button later passed on this trophy to John Misha Petkevich following the 1972 Olympics and World Championships. Acknowledging that Gerschwiler had a better understanding of outdoor ice, Button decided to spend some time training outdoors on the Lake Placid club tennis courts.

==== 1948 European Championships ====
Button faced Gerschwiler again at the 1948 European Championships. Button led after figures in points, having 749 points to Gerschwiler's 747.8, but Gerschwiler led in placings, with 14 to Button's 15. During the free skating, Button performed his Olympic program for the first time. He won, with 11 placings to Gerschwiler's 18. Following this year, when North Americans took home the men's and ladies' titles, non-Europeans were no longer allowed to enter into the European Championships. Button is the only American to have won the European Championships.

==== 1948 Olympics ====
At the 1948 Winter Olympics, Button led Gerschwiler by a 29.6 point lead following the figures portion of the competition, having won four of the five figures. Button had been attempting the double Axel jump in practice but had never landed it. In practice on the day before the free skating event, Button landed one in practice for the first time. He decided to put it into his free skating for the next day. Button landed it in competition, becoming the first skater in the world to do so. Button received eight firsts and two seconds, for a total of 10 places. Gerschwiler had 23. That combined with the figures results gave Button the gold medal. At the age of 18 he became, and remains, the youngest man to win the Olympic gold in figure skating.

==== 1948 World Championships ====
Button went on to win the 1948 World Championships, where he faced Gerschwiler for the last time. Button won the event. At the time, the U.S. Championships were held after the World Championships, and Button finished his season by defending his national title. In February 1948, Button, his coach, and his mother were in Prague to perform an exhibition. They were stranded there after the Soviet-backed coup and had to be extracted by the U.S. Army. In 1949, Button won the Sullivan Award as the outstanding amateur athlete in the United States. He is one of only two male figure skaters to win this award. Evan Lysacek is the other.

==== College years ====
Button had intended to attend Yale University beginning in the fall of 1947, but deferred a year due to the Olympics. Although he had originally been assured that his skating would not be a problem as long as his grades were good, he was later informed that he could not continue competing if he wanted to attend Yale. On advice from people from the Skating Club of Boston, Button applied to, and was accepted at, Harvard College. Button was a full-time student at Harvard while skating competitively and graduated in 1952 and was a member of The Delphic Club, one of the University's select "Final Clubs". He went on to win every international competition he entered for the next four years.

As reigning and defending champion, as well as being the first skater to perform a double Axel and a flying camel, Button was under pressure to perform a new jump or spin every season. In 1949, he performed a 2Lo-2Lo combination. He was the winner of the James E. Sullivan Award as the top U.S. amateur athlete of 1949, becoming the first figure skater to win the award. In 1950, he performed the 2Lo-2Lo-2Lo. In 1951, he performed a 2A-2Lo combination and a 2A-2A sequence. For the 1952 Winter Olympics, Button and Lussi began working on a triple jump. They settled on training the triple loop. Button landed it for the first time in practice in December 1951 at the Skating Club of Boston, and for the first time in exhibition in Vienna following the European Championships.

==== 1952 Olympics ====
At the 1952 Winter Olympics, Button had the lead after figures, with nine first places, over Helmut Seibt. Button's point total was 1,000.2 to Seibt's 957.7. During his free skate program, Button successfully landed the triple loop, becoming the first person to complete a triple jump in competition He became the third male figure skater to win two Olympic gold medals after Gillis Grafström and Karl Schäfer. He was the last man to defend his Olympic title in figure skating until Yuzuru Hanyu won his second Olympic gold in 2018. He repeated as Gold medalist, then went on to defend his titles at the 1952 World Figure Skating Championships and U.S. Championships.

=== Professional ===
Button decided to enter Harvard Law School in the fall of 1952. Because of the time commitments, Button retired from amateur skating that year to focus on law school. He completed a Bachelor of Laws (LL.B.) degree in 1956 and was admitted to the bar in the District of Columbia.

Following his retirement from competition, Button had a short career performing in ice shows. He signed on to skate with the Ice Capades during his law school vacations. He toured with Holiday on Ice. He co-produced "Dick Button's Ice-Travaganza" for the 1964 New York World's Fair, starring 1963 World Champion Donald McPherson, but the ice show lost money and closed after a few months.

As founder of Candid Productions, he created a variety of made-for-television sports events, including the World Professional Figure Skating Championships, Challenge of Champions, and Dorothy Hamill specials for HBO. As an actor, Button performed in such films as The Young Doctors and The Bad News Bears Go to Japan starring Tony Curtis. He appeared in television roles, including Hans Brinker and Mr. Broadway, as well as appearing in a 1995 episode of Animaniacs, voicing himself in the three-part segment "All the Words in the English Language".

Figure skating historian James R. Hines said that it was in roles other than as a skater in which Button has had the greatest influence on the sport. As Hines states, "Perhaps no name is better known in figure skating, a result of his visibility for more than 40 years as a commentator. ...Through that forum, he had the opportunity to champion the sport more than any other person". Hines also says that Button's commentating career gave him a 40-year long historical perspective. Button provided commentary for CBS's broadcast of the 1960 Winter Olympics, launching a decades-long career in television broadcast journalism. He did commentary for CBS's broadcast of the 1961 United States Figure Skating Championships. Beginning in 1962, he worked as a figure skating analyst for ABC Sports, which had acquired the rights to the United States Figure Skating Championships as well as the 1962 World Figure Skating Championships. During ABC's coverage of figure skating events in the 1960s, 1970s, and 1980s, Button became the sport's best-known analyst, well known for his frank and often caustic appraisal of skaters' performances. He won an Emmy Award in 1981 for Outstanding Sports Personality – Analyst. Although other U.S. television networks aired the Winter Olympics from the 1990s onward, Button still appeared on ABC's broadcasts of the U.S. and World Figure Skating Championships until ABC quit televising them in 2008.

According to writer and figure skating historian Ellyn Kestnbaum, for viewers who had never viewed the sport live before seeing it on television, Button "in effect educated [an] entire generation in how to watch skating".

During the 2006 Winter Olympics, Button appeared on NBC on loan from ABC to once again provide commentary on the Olympics. Also during the 2006 Winter Olympics, USA Network ran a show called Olympic Ice. A recurring segment, called "Push Dick's Button," invited viewers to send in questions which Button answered on the air. The segment proved very popular so ABC and ESPN put it into various broadcasts, most notably the 2006 Skate America, the 2007 United States Figure Skating Championships, and the 2007 World Figure Skating Championships. In late 2010, he was lead judge on Skating with the Stars, produced by BBC Worldwide, producers of Dancing with the Stars. In 2009, Button served as a judge on the CBC's Battle of the Blades reality show. He again appeared on NBC to do commentary for 2010 Games.

== Personal life and death ==
Button's television skating debut came on We the People on April 11, 1952, when he skated on the rink at Rockefeller Center. He was a guest on the TV show I've Got A Secret as one of five former Olympic champions which aired October 13, 1954. In 1975, Button married figure skating coach Slavka Kohout; they had two children a son and a daughter, the couple later divorced. Button was a resident of North Salem, New York. He was inducted into the World Figure Skating Hall of Fame in 1976, the same year it was founded.

Button suffered a serious head injury on July 5, 1978, when he was one of several men assaulted in Central Park by a gang of youths armed with baseball bats. Three persons were subsequently convicted of assault. The victims were attacked at random.

On December 31, 2000, Button was skating at a public rink in Westchester County, New York, when he fell, fracturing his skull and causing a serious brain injury. He recovered and became a national spokesman for the Brain Injury Association of America as well as continuing his Emmy Award–winning commentary on broadcasts of the Olympic Games and on various figure-skating television shows.

Button died in North Salem on January 30, 2025, at the age of 95. His death occurred less than a day after several participants in the 2025 U.S. Figure Skating Championships, including skaters and coaches from the Skating Club of Boston with which Button had a life-long association, were killed in a mid-air collision over the Potomac River.

== Achievements ==
- First skater to land a double Axel
- First skater to land a triple jump (the triple loop)
- First skater to land a combination jump of three doubles
- First male skater to perform the camel spin and inventor of the flying camel spin (also known, after him, as the "Button Camel")
- Only American to win the European title
- First American to become World Champion
- First American to win the Olympic title in figure skating
- First, and only, American back-to-back Olympic champion in figure skating
- First, and only, male skater to simultaneously hold all the following titles: National, North American, European, Worlds, and Olympics
- Youngest man to win the Olympic title in figure skating (aged 18)

== Results ==
Competition placements since the 1944 season
Season	1944	1945	1946	1947	1948	1949	1950	1951	1952
Winter Olympics					1st				1st
World Championships				2nd	1st	1st	1st	1st	1st
European Championships					1st				
North American Championships				1st		1st		1st	
U.S. Championships	1st N	1st J	1st	1st	1st	1st	1st	1st	1st

== See also ==
- Canadian Professional Figure Skating Championships

== Works cited ==
- Hines, James R. (2011). Historical Dictionary of Figure Skating. Lanham, Maryland: Scarecrow Press. ISBN 978-0-8108-6859-5.
