= Ede Király =

Hungarian figure skater (1926–2009)

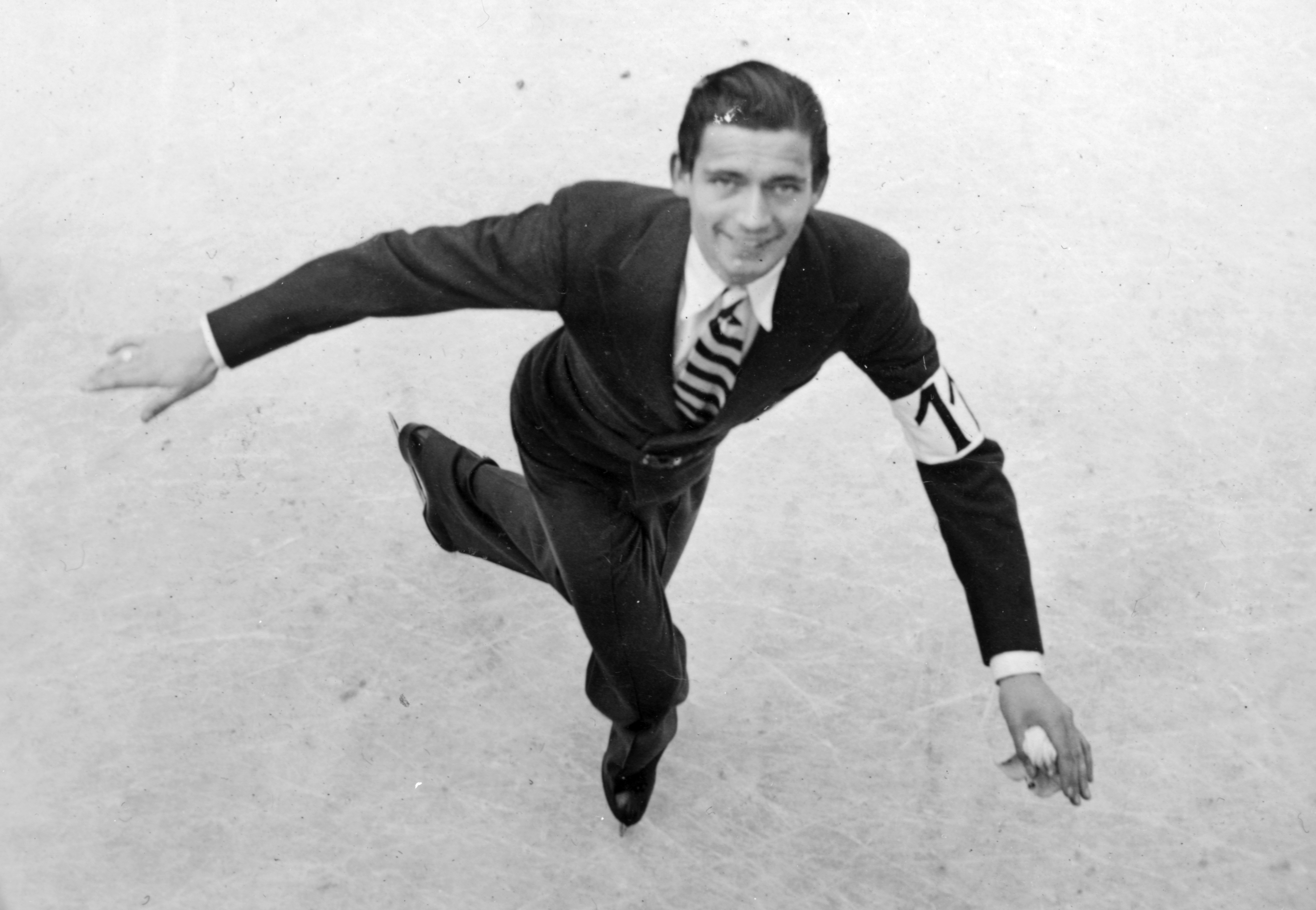
- Király in 1940

Personal information
- Born: 23 February 1926 Budapest, Kingdom of Hungary
- Died: 10 August 2009 (aged 83) Hungary

Figure skating career
- Country: Hungary
- Partner: Andrea Kékesy
Medal record
Representing Hungary
Figure skating
Olympic Games
Silver medal – second place	1948 St. Mortiz	Pairs
World Championships
Gold medal – first place	1949 Paris	Pairs
Silver medal – second place	1950 London	Men's singles
Silver medal – second place	1949 Paris	Men's singles
Silver medal – second place	1948 Davos	Pairs
Bronze medal – third place	1948 Davos	Men's singles
European Championships
Gold medal – first place	1950 Oslo	Men's singles
Gold medal – first place	1949 Milan	Pairs
Gold medal – first place	1948 Prague	Pairs
Silver medal – second place	1949 Milan	Men's singles

Ede Király (23 February 1926 – 10 August 2009) was a Hungarian figure skater who competed both in men's singles and pairs. As a competitor in men's singles, he was a three-time World medalist (silver in 1949 and 1950, bronze in 1948), the 1950 European champion, and a six-time Hungarian national champion. Competing in pairs with Andrea Kékesy, he became the 1948 Olympic silver medalist, the 1949 World champion, and a two-time European champion (1948–1949). In 1950, he defected from Hungary and worked as a coach and engineer in Canada.

== Competitive career ==
Király's international career lasted only three years. It included two years where he had the unusual accomplishment of winning World medals in both men's singles and pairs. He was coached by Arnold Gerschwiler.

In 1948, he placed fourth at the European Championships in singles skating and won gold with Kékesy in pairs. In February, at the 1948 Winter Olympics, he placed fifth in singles and won silver in pairs. The week after, at the 1948 World Championships, he and Kékesy won silver again, and he won bronze individually.

The next year, he and Kékesy won a second European title, and he placed second in the men's singles event. At the 1949 World Championships, he won an individual silver, and he and Kékesy became World champions.

Király's last year competing was 1950, where he only skated in men's singles and became the 1950 European champion. At the World Championships, he won a second silver medal.

After the close of the championships, Király was friendly with the Hungarian ambassador, who held a reception for the competitors, but then went to the London Home Office and defected from communist Hungary. Király said that he feared returning to Hungary, as he refused to join the Hungarian Communist Party, and that his passport and other papers were being held by a Hungarian intelligence officer. His family in Hungary, as well as another coach of his, Rudolf Dillinger, were arrested in response. Hungarian figure skaters were also not allowed to compete in the 1951 European and World Championships.

== Post-skating career ==
In 1950, Király graduated from the Technical University of Budapest. After defecting from Hungary, he moved to Canada and became a coach in Oshawa, Ontario; he also worked as an engineer. His students included Donald Jackson. He returned to Hungary several times later in his life.

== Results ==
=== Men's singles ===
International
Event	1940	1941	1942	1943	1944	1946	1947	1948	1949	1950
Winter Olympics								5th		
World Championships								3rd	2nd	2nd
European Championships								4th	2nd	1st
National
Hungarian Championships	2nd	2nd	2nd	2nd	1st	1st	1st	1st	1st	1st

=== Pairs with Kékesy ===
International
Event	1944	1947	1948	1949
Winter Olympics			2nd	
World Championships			2nd	1st
European Championships			1st	1st
National
Hungarian Championships	1st	1st	1st	1st
