= Canadian Professional Figure Skating Championships =

Recurring figure skating competition

The Canadian Professional Figure Skating Championships (known after 1998 as the Canadian Open pro-am competition) was an elite made-for-TV figure skating competition. It was created by Dick Button, a 2-time Olympic gold medalist, through his production company Candid Productions. It usually took place in December. For most of its existence, it was an unsanctioned professional event, meaning that skaters who participated lost their eligibility to compete in the Winter Olympic Games and other "amateur" skating events controlled by the International Skating Union.

== History ==
The first professional championship was held in 1994 in Hamilton, Ontario. Skaters competed in three disciplines: men's singles, ladies' singles, and pair skating. It was held again in 1995, 1996 and 1997 as a professional competition. In 1998 the competition was reworked to both include ice dancing for the first time and allow both amateur and professional skaters to compete against each other in a pro-am style competition. From 2000 to 2002 ice dancing was again not included in the events. The competition was last held in 2002 and was held in different Canadian venues and cities from year to year.

== Professional champions ==
Year	Ladies' singles	Men's singles	Pair skating	Ice dancing
1994	Josée Chouinard	Scott Hamilton	Gordeeva & Grinkov	none
1995	Yuka Sato	Kurt Browning	Underhill & Martini	none
1996	Caryn Kadavy	Kurt Browning	Bechke & Petrov	none
1997	Josée Chouinard	Kurt Browning	Brasseur & Eisler	none
1998	Nicole Bobek	Kurt Browning	Wotzel & Steuer	Usova & Platov
1999	Josée Chouinard	Todd Eldredge	Berezhnaya & Sikharulidze	Bourne & Kraatz
2000	Josée Chouinard	Alexei Yagudin	Sale & Pelletier	none
2001	Josée Chouinard	Brian Orser	Ina & Zimmerman	none
2002	Sasha Cohen	Alexei Yagudin	Sale & Pelletier	none
