= Jacques Gerschwiler =

Swiss figure skater and coach

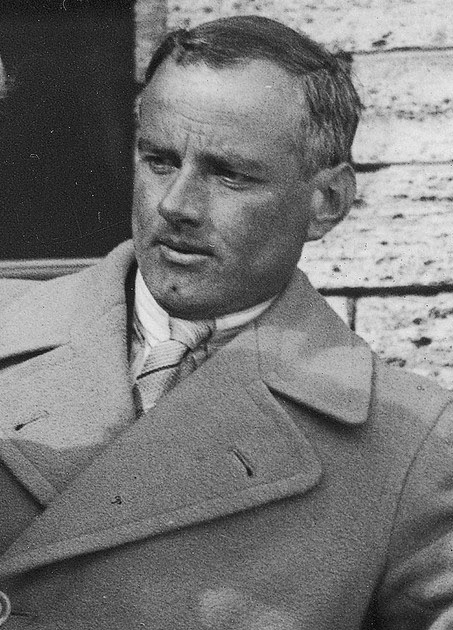
- Gerschwiler at the 1938 European Figure Skating Championships

Personal information
- Born: 10 September 1898 Arbon, Switzerland
- Died: 4 May 2000 (aged 101) Geneva, Switzerland

Jacques Gerschwiler (10 September 1898 – 4 May 2000) was a Swiss figure skater and coach.

== Personal life ==
Born in Arbon, Switzerland in 1898, he was the half-brother of Arnold Gerschwiler and the uncle of Hans Gerschwiler. His nickname was "Gersch". He died in 2000 at the age of 101. A few years before his death, his friends learned that he also had a sister who was still alive at the time he died, though he was estranged from her.

== Career ==
Gerschwiler went to Berlin to study to become a sports coach, where he became familiar with skating and began to develop his own ideas about skating technique. As a skater, he competed and medaled at the British Open Professional Championships in 1933 and 1934. However, he was primarily known for being a coach, especially of compulsory figures.

In 1929, he moved to England and taught there until the 1960s. Arnold soon moved to England as well and also began coaching; the two of them had a friendly coaching rivalry, with Jacques Gerschwiler focusing more on British skaters and his brother focusing more on skaters from other parts of Europe. Among Gerschwiler's students were World and European champions Cecilia Colledge and Jeannette Altwegg, European silver medalist Sally Stapleford, Olympian Bridget Adams, European bronze medalist Barbara Wyatt, British champion Jacqueline Harbord, and European bronze medalist Karin Iten.

British skater T. D. Richardson credited both brothers for having a considerable influence on figure skating in general, and Jacques specifically for improving the accuracy and performance of compulsory figures and turns.

Gerschilwer moved back to Switzerland and lived in a hotel in Geneva. In 1977, he and Otto Hügin published a book, which was released in German as Eiskunstlaufen: ein Lehrbuch für alle and in English as The Technique of Skating.

He was elected to the World Figure Skating Hall of Fame in 1976 as part of the inaugural class. He and his brother were both inducted into the Professional Skaters Association's Coaches Hall of Fame in 2004.
