= Karel Vosátka =

Czechoslaovak figure skater

Personal information
- Born: November 20, 1929 Plzeň, Czechoslovakia
- Died: 27 May 2022 (aged 92) Quebec, Canada

Figure skating career
- Country: Czechoslovakia
- Partner: Blažena Knittlová, Věra Vajsábelová, Hana Dvořáková
Medal record
Representing Czechoslovakia
Figure skating: Pairs
European Championships
Silver medal – second place	1948 Prague	Pairs

Karel Vosátka (November 20, 1929 – 27 May 2022) was a pair skater who competed for Czechoslovakia. With skating partner Blažena Knittlová, he was the 1948 European silver medalist.

== Personal life ==
Vosátka was born on November 20, 1929, in Plzeň. He married Romanian figure skater Cristina Patraulea in 1963 and emigrated to Canada in 1975. Vosátka has coached in Romania (1961–64); Gottwaldov (Zlín), Czechoslovakia; Switzerland (1968–1974); France (1974–1975), and Montreal, Quebec, Canada. He has coached for several years with her wife for CPA Stellaire and CPA Fantasia in Baie-Comeau, Quebec, Canada. His son, Robin Vosatka (born September 8, 1965), finished 4th in pair skating at the 1981 Canadian Championships.

Vosátka died on 27 May 2022, at the age of 92.

== Career ==
Early in his career, Vosátka competed in partnership with Blažena Knittlová. They were awarded the silver medal at the 1948 European Championships in Prague. The pair withdrew from the 1948 Winter Olympics in St. Moritz. Their partnership ended in 1953. Vosátka teamed up with Věra Vajsábelová and then Hana Dvořáková. Dvořáková/Vosátka competed at five European Championships, achieving their best result, 5th, in 1960. He retired from competition in 1961, following the crash of Sabena Flight 548 and cancellation of the World Championships in Prague.

== Results ==
=== With Knittlová ===
Event	1947	1948	1949	1950	1951	1952	1953
Winter Olympics		WD					
World Championships		9th					
European Championships		2nd					
Czechoslovak Championships	3rd	1st		2nd		2nd	2nd

=== With Vajsábelová ===
Event	1953
Czechoslovak Champ.	2nd

=== With Dvořáková ===
Event	1957	1958	1959	1960	1961
European Championships	9th	6th	6th	5th	6th
Czechoslovak Champ.	2nd	2nd	1st	1st	1st
