= Hildegard Appeltauer =

Austrian figure skater (1927–2017)

Personal information
- Full name: Hildegarde Maria Appeltauer
- Nationality: Austrian
- Born: 4 July 1927
- Died: 4 October 2017 (aged 90) Vienna, Austria

Sport
- Sport: Figure skating

Hildegarde Maria Appeltauer (4 July 1927 – 4 October 2017) was an Austrian figure skater. She competed in the ladies' singles event at the 1948 Winter Olympics. Appeltauer died in Vienna on 4 October 2017, at the age of 90.
