= Edmond Verbustel =

Suzanne Diskeuve
Figure skating career
- Country: Belgium
Medal record
Representing Belgium
Figure skating: Pairs
World Championships
Bronze medal – third place	1947 Stockholm	Pairs
European Championships
Bronze medal – third place	1947 Davos	Pairs

Edmond Verbustel is a Belgian figure skater who competed in pair skating.

With partner Suzanne Diskeuve, in 1947 he won bronze medals at both the European Figure Skating Championships (in Davos) and the World Figure Skating Championships (in Stockholm).

== Competitive highlights ==
With Suzanne Diskeuve

Event	1947
World Championships	3rd
European Championships	3rd
