= Alena Vrzáňová =

Czech figure skater

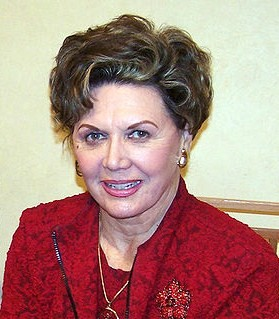
- Vrzáňová in 2009

Personal information
- Full name: Alena Vrzáňová
- Other names: Ája Zanová
- Born: 16 May 1931 Prague, Czechoslovakia
- Died: 30 July 2015 (aged 84) New York City, US

Figure skating career
- Country: Czechoslovakia
- Coach: Arnold Gerschwiler (former)
- Skating club: VŠ Praha
- Retired: 1950
Medal record
Figure skating: Ladies' singles
Representing Czechoslovakia
World Championships
Gold medal – first place	1950 London	Ladies' singles
Gold medal – first place	1949 Paris	Ladies' singles
European Championships
Gold medal – first place	1950 Oslo	Ladies' singles
Silver medal – second place	1949 Milan	Ladies' singles
Bronze medal – third place	1948 Prague	Ladies' singles

Alena "Ája" Vrzáňová (Czech pronunciation: [ˈalɛna ˈaːja ˈvr̩zaːɲovaː], also Zanová, married name: Steindler; 16 May 1931 – 30 July 2015) was a Czech figure skater who represented Czechoslovakia in competition. Vrzáňová is the 1949 & 1950 World champion and 1950 European champion.

== Early life ==
Vrzáňová was born in Prague, Czechoslovakia, in 1931. In addition to figure skating, she also played piano and attended ballet school.

Vrzáňová started sports at the age of three when her parents bought her skis. They spent each winter in the Krkonoše mountains. After this tradition was interrupted during World War II, Vrzáňová started figure skating. The training conditions were difficult, as she had to skate in early winter mornings. Her training sessions were held in darkness because of the dim-out regulations. She skated at the open Štvanice Stadium before the sessions for hockey players, or at the CLTK club tennis courts, which were flooded with water and frozen.

== Career ==
In 1946, Vrzáňová became the Czechoslovak junior national champion. In early 1947, she moved to Richmond, London to be coached by Arnold Gerschwiler. In 1947, she won the Czechoslovak national championships and placed 7th at the 1947 World Figure Skating Championships.

Vrzáňová represented Czechoslovakia at the 1948 Winter Olympics. She placed fifth in the event, finishing behind compatriot Jiřina Nekolová.

In 1949, Vrzáňová was awarded the silver medal at the European Championships in Milan and won her first World title in Paris. She seized her chance to win the gold medal as the Olympic runner-up and reigning European champion Eva Pawlik of Austria had dropped out because of a broken boot heel just before the free program. At the event, she was credited as being the first woman to land a double Lutz jump.

After winning the 1950 European Championships, she won a second world title at the 1950 World Championships. She then went on a European tour instead of returning home. She eventually moved to the United States and performed for the traveling show Ice Follies for three years under the name "Aja Zanova" before joining the Ice Capades. She also participated in television ads and other shows. After her husband's death, she worked for the Ice Capades and led New York City's largest public ice rink, the Wollman Rink.

== Personal life ==
In February 1948 communists seized power in Czechoslovakia. After spending the winter of 1949 at home in Czechoslovakia, her father advised her not to come back from the upcoming World Championships and she agreed. She defected from Czechoslovakia during the 1950 World Championships in London and was eventually offered political asylum. Her mother followed her in March under dramatic circumstances – her plane was hijacked. Her father, a professional cello player, visited them several times, but decided not to leave his country permanently. He was held as a political prisoner for 13 years and forced to work in a coal mine. His daughter did not return to Prague until 1990, after the Velvet Revolution.

In 1969, Vrzáňová married Czech-born innkeeper Pavel Steindler; they adopted two children. They ran the Duck Joint restaurant in New York City, and later the Czech Pavilion. She died on 30 July 2015 at the age of 84 while living in New York City.

== Awards ==
Vrzáňová was inducted into the World Figure Skating Hall of Fame in 2009. In 2009, she also received the title of the Sports Legend of the Czech Republic. In 2012, Czech Foreign Minister Karel Schwarzenberg presented to her the 16th annual Gratias Agit Awards in recognition of those who promote the good name of the Czech Republic abroad.

== Competitive highlights ==
International
Event	1946	1947	1948	1949	1950
Winter Olympics			5th		
World Champ.		7th	5th	1st	1st
European Champ.		6th	3rd	2nd	1st
National
Czechoslovak Champ.	1st J.	1st	1st	1st	1st
J. = Junior level
