= Éva Lindner =

Hungarian figure skater (1926–2016)

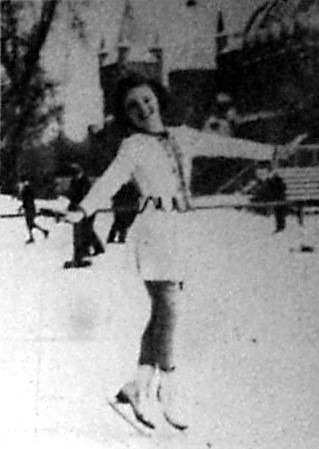
- Éva Lindner in 1939

Personal information
- Nationality: Hungarian
- Born: 24 February 1926; Budapest, Hungary
- Died: 19 August 2016 (aged 90); Budapest, Hungary

Sport
- Sport: Figure skating

Éva Lindner (24 February 1926 – 19 August 2016) was a Hungarian figure skater. She competed in the ladies' singles event at the 1948 Winter Olympics.
