= Blažena Knittlová =

Czechoslovak figure skater

Personal information
- Full name: Blažena Knittlová
- Born: 8 February 1931

Figure skating career
- Country: Czechoslovakia
- Partner: Karel Vosátka
Medal record
Representing Czechoslovakia
Pairs Figure skating
European Championships
Silver medal – second place	1948 Prague	Pairs

Blažena Knittlová (born 8 February 1931) was a pairs figure skater who competed for Czechoslovakia. With partner Karel Vosátka, she won the silver medal at the European Figure Skating Championships in 1948 and finished 16th at the 1948 Winter Olympics.

== Results ==
(pairs with Karel Vosátka)

Event	1947	1948	1949	1950	1951	1952	1953
Winter Olympic Games		WD					
World Championships		9th					
European Championships		2nd					
Czechoslovak Championships	3rd	1st		2nd		2nd	2nd
