= Marilyn Ruth Take =

Canadian figure skater (1928–2023)

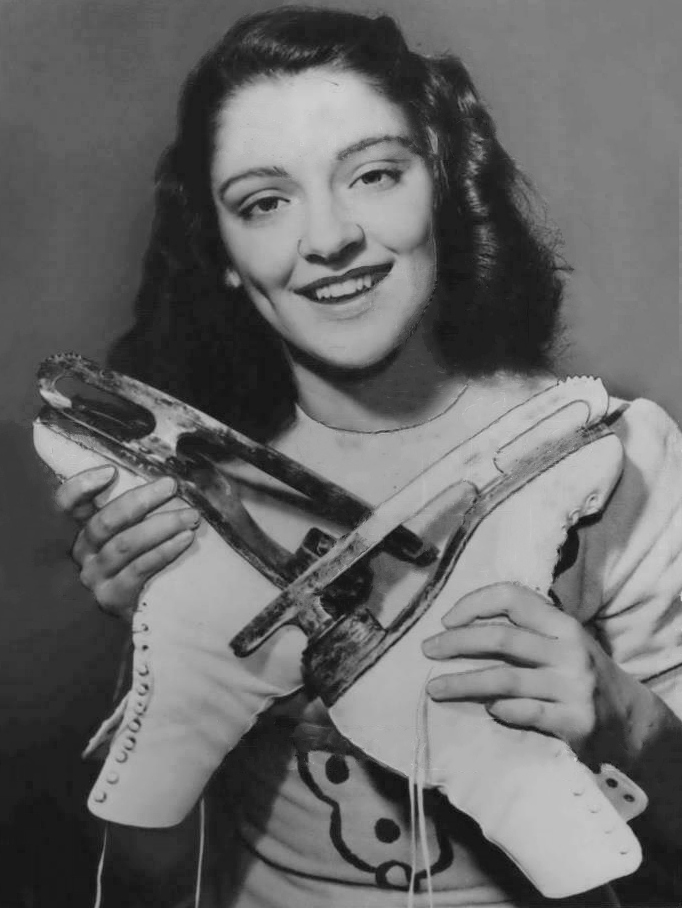
- Take in 1948

Personal information
- Born: Marilyn Ruth Take; March 11, 1928 Toronto, Ontario, Canada
- Died: April 14, 2023 (aged 95)
- Height: 167 cm (5 ft 6 in)

Sport
- Sport: Figure skating
- Club: Toronto Skating Club

Marilyn Ruth Wittstock (née Take; March 11, 1928 – April 14, 2023) was a Canadian figure skater who competed in ladies' singles, under the name of Marilyn Ruth Take. She won the gold medal at the Canadian Figure Skating Championships in 1947 and competed at the 1948 Winter Olympics, finishing in 12th position.

== Results ==
(Ladies' singles)

Event	1944	1945	1946	1947	1948
Winter Olympics					12th
World Championships					12th
Canadian Championships	2nd	2nd	2nd	1st	

(Pairs with Will White Jr.)

Event	1944
Canadian Championships	2nd J

== Biography ==
Marilyn Ruth Take was born in Toronto on March 11, 1928. She studied ballet at age 5 and danced in the opera Hansel and Gretel at age 17. She also learned the violin and was a springboard diver. She was inspired to take up figure skating after seeing a performance by Norwegian figure skater Sonja Henie. Sponsored by Toronto Skating Club, she skated at Maple Leaf Gardens in 1937.

In 1945 and 1946, Take came in second place after Barbara Ann Scott in the Canadian Figure Skating Championships. In the 1947 championships, Take came in first place while Scott was competing abroad at the time of the event.

Take finished twelfth in the 1948 Winter Olympics in St. Moritz, Switzerland; she had a fall on a slushy outdoor rink that had ruts from hockey games. Despite that, her performance did receive praise from Mildred Richardson of The Observer and T.D. Richardson of the Times of London, a former Olympic skater. She also competed in the world championships at Davos finishing 13th. Scott won both these competitions. After her return from Europe, Take joined the Shipstads and Johnson Ice Follies being billed as a professional solo skater.

In 1953, she married Roy Codrington Wittstock and stayed home to raise their three children. Later, the marriage would end in divorce. In the 1970s, she worked as a figure skating coach at several Ontario skating clubs.

Take died on April 14, 2023, at the age of 95 of dementia.
