= Lotti Höner =

Swiss figure skater (1928–2025)

Lotti Margrit Höner
Personal information
- Nationality: Swiss
- Born: 19 August 1928; Basel, Switzerland
- Died: 27 January 2025 (aged 96); Zurich, Switzerland

Sport
- Sport: Figure skating

Lotti Margrit Höner (19 August 1928 – 27 January 2025) was a Swiss figure skater. She competed in the ladies' singles event at the 1948 Winter Olympics. Honer died in Zurich on 27 January 2025, at the age of 96.
