= Hans Gerschwiler =

Swiss figure skater (1921–2017)

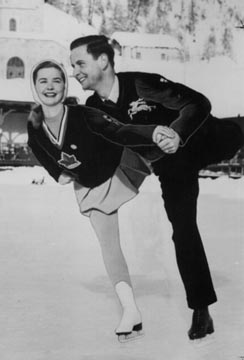
- Barbara Ann Scott and Hans Gerschwiler in 1948

Personal information
- Born: 21 June 1920 Winterthur, Canton of Zürich
- Died: 27 September 2017 (aged 97) Pinehurst, North Carolina

Figure skating career
- Country: Switzerland
Medal record
Representing Switzerland
Men's Figure skating
Olympic Games
Silver medal – second place	1948 St. Moritz	Men's singles
World Championships
Silver medal – second place	1948 Davos	Men's singles
Gold medal – first place	1947 Stockholm	Men's singles
European Championships
Silver medal – second place	1948 Prague	Men's singles
Gold medal – first place	1947 Davos	Men's singles

Hans Gerschwiler (21 June 1920 – 27 September 2017) was a Swiss figure skater. He was the 1948 Olympic silver medalist.

== Career ==
Gerschwiler made his international debut at the 1939 European Championships, where he placed 5th. Between 1939 and 1947, no international skating competitions were held, due to World War II. Gerschwiler had been living in England with his uncle and coach Jacques Gerschwiler when the war broke out. When his uncle was called home to Switzerland, Gerschwiler stayed with Cecilia Colledge's family. He spent the war years working as a factory worker and fire watcher and was able to practice skating only once a week.

Following the war, Gerschwiler emerged as one of the dominant skaters of the time.

Gerschwiler won the 1947 World Figure Skating Championships and European Figure Skating Championships. He also won the silver medal at the 1948 Winter Olympics in St. Moritz and came in second at the 1948 European Championships, both times finishing behind Dick Button. He was coached by his uncle Arnold Gerschwiler.

Gerschwiler was considered to be a beautiful free-skater and one of the best school-skaters in the world at the time. He turned professional after the 1948 Winter Olympics.

Until Stéphane Lambiel won his first world title in 2005, Gerschwiler was the only Swiss man ever to have been World Champion. He and Lambiel are the only Swiss figure skaters ever to have won a silver medal at the Olympics. The only other Swiss skater to medal at the Olympics was Georges Gautschi, who won bronze in 1924. After Lambiel's win in 2005, Gerschwiler sent him a congratulatory message.

== Results ==
Event	1938	1939	1946	1947	1948
Winter Olympic Games					2nd
World Championships				1st	2nd
European Championships		5th		1st	2nd
Swiss Championships	1st	1st	1st	1st	1st
