= Karol Kennedy =

American pair skater

Personal information
- Born: February 14, 1932 Shelton, Washington, U.S.
- Died: June 25, 2004 (aged 72) Seattle, Washington, U.S.

Figure skating career
- Country: United States
- Retired: 1952
Medal record
Pairs' figure skating
Representing United States
Olympic Games
| Silver medal – second place | 1952 Oslo | Pairs |
World Championships
| Silver medal – second place | 1952 Paris | Pairs |
| Silver medal – second place | 1951 Milan | Pairs |
| Gold medal – first place | 1950 London | Pairs |
| Silver medal – second place | 1949 Paris | Pairs |
| Silver medal – second place | 1947 Stockholm | Pairs |
North American Championships
| Gold medal – first place | 1951 Calgary | Pairs |
| Gold medal – first place | 1949 Philadelphia | Pairs |
| Bronze medal – third place | 1947 Ottawa | Pairs |

Karol Estelle Kennedy Kucher (February 14, 1932 in Shelton, Washington – June 25, 2004 in Seattle, Washington) was an American pair skater. With her brother, Peter, she won five U.S. Championship titles from 1948 to 1952. Known as "The Kennedy Kids," they won the World Championship in 1950, and the silver medal in the 1952 Winter Olympics.

== Competitive highlights ==
(all with Peter)

| Event | 1946 | 1947 | 1948 | 1949 | 1950 | 1951 | 1952 |
|---|---|---|---|---|---|---|---|
| Winter Olympic Games | | | 6th | | | | 2nd |
| World Championships | | 2nd | 4th | 2nd | 1st | 2nd | 2nd |
| North American Championships | | 3rd | | 1st | | 1st | |
| U.S. Championships | 2nd | 2nd | 1st | 1st | 1st | 1st | 1st |
