= Wallace Diestelmeyer =

Canadian figure skater

Wallace Distelmeyer
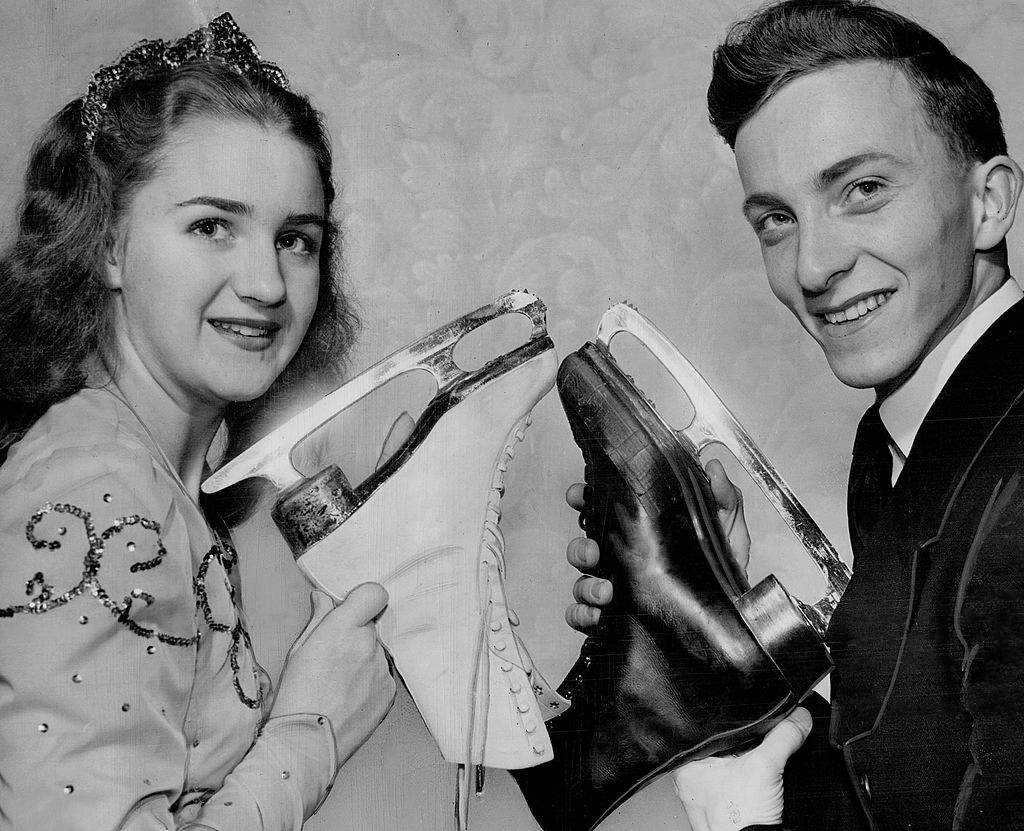
- Suzanne Morrow and Wally Diestelmeyer in 1948

Personal information
- Born: July 14, 1926 Kitchener, Ontario, Canada
- Died: December 23, 1999 (aged 73) Oakville, Ontario, Canada

Figure skating career
- Country: Canada
- Skating club: Toronto Skating Club
Medal record
Representing Canada
Men's figure skating
North American Championships
Bronze medal – third place	1947 Ottawa	Men's singles
Pairs figure skating
Winter Olympic Games
Bronze medal – third place	1948 St. Moritz	Pairs
World Championships
Bronze medal – third place	1948 Davos	Pairs
North American Championships
Gold medal – first place	1947 Ottawa	Pairs

Wallace William "Wally" Diestelmeyer (July 14, 1926 – December 23, 1999) was a Canadian figure skater. He competed in pair skating with Suzanne Morrow. The couple won the bronze medal at the 1948 Winter Olympics and the 1948 World Figure Skating Championships. They are credited as being the first pair to perform the death spiral one-handed, with the man holding the woman in position with one hand, at the 1948 Olympic Games.

After retiring from competitions Distelmeyer worked as a skating coach. In 1992 he was inducted into the Skate Canada Hall of Fame, together with Morrow.

== Results ==
Men's singles

Event	1946	1947	1948
Winter Olympics			12th
World Championships			9th
North American Championships		3rd	
Canadian Championships	1st J	2nd	1st

Pairs with Suzanne Morrow

Event	1947	1948
Winter Olympics		3rd
World Championships		3rd
North American Championships	1st	
Canadian Championships	1st	1st

with Joyce Perkins

Event	1946
Canadian Championships	1st

with Floraine Ducharme

Event	1941	1942
Canadian Championships		2nd
Canadian Junior Championships	2nd	1st

Ice dance with Suzanne Morrow

Event	1948
Canadian Championships	1st
