= Edi Rada =

Austrian figure skater

Personal information
- Born: 13 September 1922
- Died: July 13, 1997

Figure skating career
- Country: Austria
- Skating club: North Shore Skating Club, North Vancouver, B.C. Canada
Medal record
Representing Austria
Men's Figure skating
Olympic Games
Bronze medal – third place	1948 St. Moritz	Men's singles
World Championships
Bronze medal – third place	1949 Paris	Men's singles
European Championships
Gold medal – first place	1949 Milan	Men's singles
Bronze medal – third place	1948 Prague	Men's singles

Edi Rada (13 September 1922 – 13 July 1997) was an Austrian figure skater. He won the bronze medal at the 1948 Winter Olympics and was the 1949 European Champion. He won a bronze medal at the 1949 World Figure Skating Championships.

== Results ==
Event	1938	1939	1940	1941	1942	1943	1944	1945	1946	1947	1948	1949
Winter Olympic Games											3rd	
World Championships	7th	4th									WD	3rd
European Championships	7th	4th									3rd	1st
German Championships		2nd		2nd		1st						
Austrian Championships	2nd	1st	1st	1st	1st				1st	1st	1st	1st
