= Suzanne Morrow Francis =

Canadian figure skater

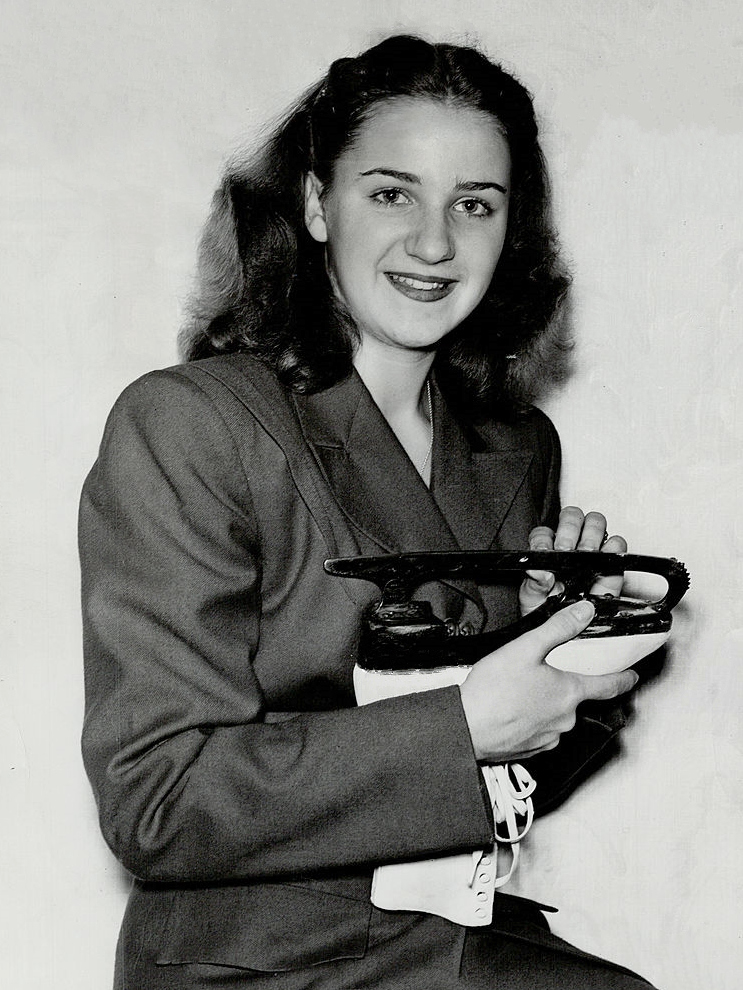
- Suzanne Morrow Francis in 1947

Personal information
- Born: December 14, 1930 Toronto, Ontario, Canada
- Died: June 11, 2006 (aged 75)

Figure skating career
- Country: Canada
Medal record
Representing Canada
Ladies' figure skating
North American Championships
Silver medal – second place	1951 Calgary	Ladies' singles
Pairs' figure skating
Winter Olympic Games
Bronze medal – third place	1948 St. Moritz	Pairs
World Championships
Bronze medal – third place	1948 Davos	Pairs
North American Championships
Gold medal – first place	1947 Ottawa	Pairs

Suzanne Morrow Francis (December 14, 1930 – June 11, 2006) was a Canadian figure skater and veterinarian. She competed in Ladies' Singles in the 1948 and 1952 Winter Olympics. Between 1947 and 1948, Francis competed in Pairs Mixed competitions with Canadian figure skater Wallace Diestelmeyer. Together they won the bronze medal at the 1948 Winter Olympics and the 1948 World Figure Skating Championships. They were the first pair team to perform the death spiral one-handed, with the man holding the woman in position with one hand, at the 1948 Olympic Games.

== Figure skating ==
Competing in Ladies' Singles, Suzanne Morrow Francis came in 14th at the St. Moritz Winter Olympics but ended up in 6th place at the 1952 Oslo Winter Olympics. She retired from competition in 1953 but did not sever ties with figure skating. While working as a veterinarian, Francis continued to serve as a figure skating judge and has been for over fifty years. Additionally, she planned to work to work with the Peterborough Figure Skating Club. Also, she was included in the top six women skaters in the world five years prior to when she had retired.

At the 1988 Winter Olympics in Calgary, Francis took the Judge's Oath, the first woman to do so at the Winter Olympics. In 1992, she was inducted into the Skate Canada Hall of Fame together with Diestelmeyer. She continued working as a veterinarian until retirement in 1995.

== Veterinary career ==
In 1952, Francis earned her degree in veterinary medicine from the Ontario Veterinary College in Guelph, Ontario. For a time, Francis shared a clinic with Dr. Edith Williams, the second Canadian woman to earn a degree as a veterinarian. During that time, she also served as an All Breed dog show judge as part of the Canadian Kennel Club.

Francis had always loved dogs and frequently had a dog by her side. Her favourite dog was a German Shepherd. Other than the time she went to veterinary school in Guelph, her longest time she spent in school was two months because figure skating took up the majority of her time. Also because of this, she mostly relied on tutors to get the help she needed to get through school.

== Francis' figure skating records ==
Ladies singles

Event	1946	1947	1948	1949	1950	1951	1952	1953
Winter Olympics			14th				6th	
World Championships			13th		4th	4th	4th	5th
North American Championships						2nd		
Canadian Championships	1st J	3rd	6th	1st	1st	1st		

Pairs with Norris Bowden

Event	1945	1946
Canadian Championships	1st J	2nd

Pairs Mixed with Wallace Diestelmeyer

Event	1947	1948
Winter Olympics		3rd
World Championships		3rd
North American Championships	1st	
Canadian Championships	1st	1st

Ice dance with Wallace Diestelmeyer

Event	1948
Canadian Championships	1st
