= Marion Davies (figure skater) =

British figure skater

Personal information
- Nationality: British
- Born: 12 October 1927 (age 98) Wembley, England

Sport
- Sport: Figure skating

Marion Davies (born 12 October 1927) was a British figure skater. She competed in the ladies' singles event at the 1948 Winter Olympics.

After competing, she turned professional, touring the world in ice shows. While performing in the Middle East in the early 1950s an Arab Sheik tried to buy her as a wife from the manager of the tour.
