= John Lettengarver =

American figure skater

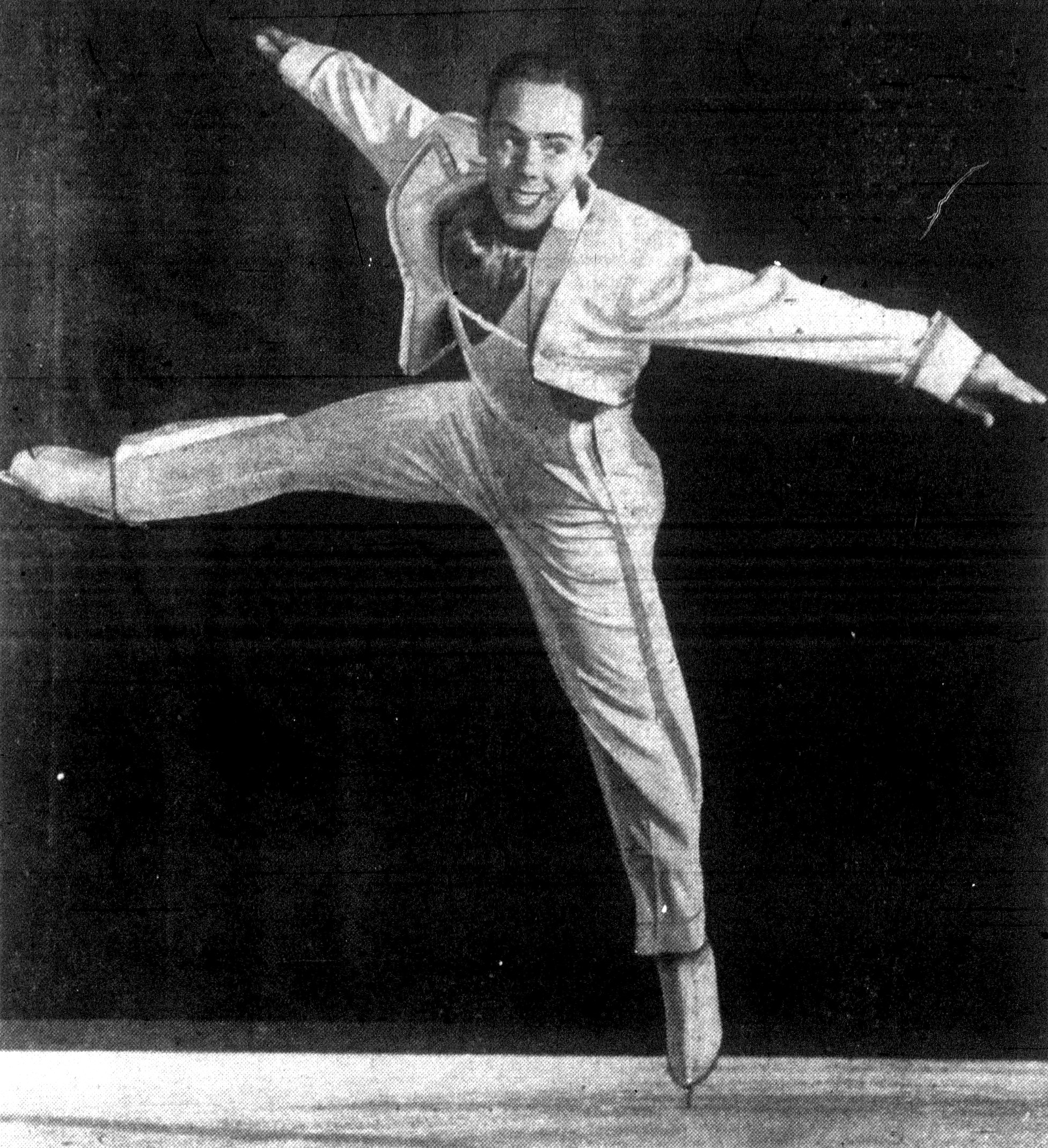
Lettengraver, circa 1951

John Lettengarver (April 29, 1929 – January 14, 1997) was an American figure skater who competed in men's singles. He won the silver medal at the 1947 United States Figure Skating Championships and finished fourth at the 1948 Winter Olympics.

Lettengarver was born in Saint Paul, Minnesota and died in Edmonds, Washington.

== Results ==
Event	1946	1947	1948
Winter Olympic Games			4th
World Championships			4th
European Championships			5th
U.S. Championships	1st J	2nd	3rd
