= Susi Giebisch =

Austrian pair skater

Susanne "Susi" Giebisch (born 7 January 1930) is an Austrian former pair skater. Competing with Hellmut Seibt, she finished 11th at the 1948 Winter Olympics. She later competed with Rudi Seeliger, and the pair won the gold medal at the Austrian Figure Skating Championships in 1950.

== Results ==
=== Pairs with Seeliger ===
National
Event	1950
Austrian Championships	1st

=== Pairs with Seibt ===
International
Event	1946	1947	1948
Winter Olympics			11th
World Championships			13th
European Championships			8th
National
Austrian Championships	2nd	2nd	2nd

=== Ladies' singles ===
National
Event	1949	1950
Austrian Championships	3rd	2nd
