= Dagmar Lerchová =

Czech figure skater

Personal information
- Other names: Dagmar Řeháková
- Born: 22 October 1930 Prague, Czechoslovakia
- Died: 24 April 2017 (aged 86)

Figure skating career
- Country: Czechoslovakia
- Retired: 1955

Dagmar Lerchová, married surname: Řeháková (22 October 1930 – 24 April 2017) was a Czech figure skater who represented Czechoslovakia. She placed 13th at the 1948 Winter Olympics in St. Moritz, eighth at the 1949 World Championships in Paris, and fifth at two European Championships (1949 Milan, 1950 Oslo).

Raised in Prague district of Holešovice, Lerchová skated at a nearby ice rink and on the frozen Vltava river. On 10 December 1958, she gave birth to her daughter, Liliana Řeháková, who would place fourth in ice dancing at the 1980 Winter Olympics.

== Competitive highlights ==
International
Event	1947	1948	1949	1950	1951	1952	1953	1954	1955
Winter Olympics		13th							
World Champ.		10th	8th	12th					14th
European Champ.	11th	6th	5th	5th		7th		12th	10th
National
Czechoslovak Champ.	3rd	2nd	3rd	2nd	1st	1st		2nd	1st
