= Jacques Favart =

French figure skater

Personal information
- Full name: Jacques Jean Fernand Favart
- Born: 30 July 1920 Paris
- Died: 27 September 1980 (aged 60) Le Chesnay

Figure skating career
- Country: France
- Partner: Denise Favart

Jacques Favart (30 July 1920 – 27 September 1980) was a French sports official and figure skater.

He won the French Figure Skating Championships in men's singles in 1942. As a pair skater, he competed with his wife Denise Favart from 1946 to 1950. They placed 14th at the 1948 Winter Olympics.

He served as president of the International Skating Union from 1967 to 1980, and of Fédération Française des Sports de Glace from 1968 to 1969.

In 1981, a trophy was established in his memory, "awarded to outstanding skaters in either figure skating or speed skating in recognition of their contributors to the sport". The first recipient of the Jacques Favart Trophy was pair skater Irina Rodnina of the Soviet Union.

He was inaugurated in the World Figure Skating Hall of Fame in 1993.

== Competitive highlights ==
=== Single skating ===
Event	1936	1937	1938	1939	1942
French Championships	2nd	2nd	2nd	2nd	1st

=== Pair skating ===
(with Denise Favart)

Event	1946	1947	1948	1949	1950
Winter Olympic Games			14th		
World Championships		10th	WD	10th	12th
European Championships		8th			
French Championships	1st	1st	1st	1st	WD

- WD = Withdrawn

Sporting positions
Preceded by Ernst Labin	President of the International Skating Union; 1967–1980	Succeeded by Olaf Poulsen
