= Figure skating at the 1948 Winter Olympics =

Figure skating at the V Winter Olympics
- Type: Olympic Games

Champions
- Men's singles: (United States) Dick Button
- Ladies' singles: (Canada) Barbara Ann Scott
- Pairs: (Belgium) Micheline Lannoy / Pierre Baugniet
- Previous: 1936 Winter Olympics
- Next: 1952 Winter Olympics

Figure skating at the 1948 Winter Olympics took place at the Olympic Ice Rink in St. Moritz, Switzerland. Three figure skating events were contested: men's singles, ladies' singles, and pair skating.

== Event summary ==
Barbara Ann Scott became the first Canadian to win the figure skating gold medal while Dick Button became the first American to win a figure skating title for the United States. Button also became the first figure skater to perform a double Axel in competition. The pair of Micheline Lannoy and Pierre Baugniet became the first Belgians to win the figure skating gold medal, as well as the first Belgians to win a gold medal at the Winter Olympics.

The competition began with the men's compulsory figures on 2 February. However, the next day, competition was postponed in the midst of the ladies' figures event due to a thaw that left puddles of water on the outdoor ice surface. On 5 February competition had to be resumed, regardless of poor ice conditions, in order to allow the Games to finish on schedule. The pairs event on 7 February was skated in a heavy snowstorm, with the ice having to be scraped after each program.

== Medal summary ==
=== Medalists ===
| Event | Gold | Silver | Bronze |
|---|---|---|---|
| Men's singles | Dick Button (USA) | Hans Gerschwiler (SUI) | Edi Rada (AUT) |
| Ladies' singles | Barbara Ann Scott (CAN) | Eva Pawlik (AUT) | Jeannette Altwegg (GBR) |
| Pairs skating | Micheline Lannoy and Pierre Baugniet (BEL) | Andrea Kékesy and Ede Király (HUN) | Suzanne Morrow and Wallace Diestelmeyer (CAN) |

=== Medal table ===
| Rank | Nation | Gold | Silver | Bronze | Total |
|---|---|---|---|---|---|
| 1 | Canada | 1 | 0 | 1 | 2 |
| 2 | Belgium | 1 | 0 | 0 | 1 |
| 2 | United States | 1 | 0 | 0 | 1 |
| 4 | Austria | 0 | 1 | 1 | 2 |
| 5 | Hungary | 0 | 1 | 0 | 1 |
| 5 | Switzerland | 0 | 1 | 0 | 1 |
| 7 | Great Britain | 0 | 0 | 1 | 1 |
| Totals (7 entries) | | 3 | 3 | 3 | 9 |

== Participating nations ==
A total of 63 figure skaters from 12 nations competed at the St. Moritz Games:

- Austria (9)
- Belgium (3)
- Canada (4)
- Czechoslovakia (7)
- Denmark (1)
- France (3)
- Great Britain (9)
- Hungary (6)
- Italy (2)
- Norway (3)
- Switzerland (7)
- United States (9)
