= Hellmut Seibt =

Austrian figure skater (1929–1992)

Personal information
- Other names: Helmut Seibt
- Born: 25 June 1929 Vienna
- Died: 21 July 1992 (aged 63)

Figure skating career
- Country: Austria
Medal record
Representing Austria
Figure skating: Men's singles
Olympic Games
Silver medal – second place	1952 Oslo	Men's singles
World Championships
Bronze medal – third place	1951 Milan	Men's singles
European Championships
Gold medal – first place	1952 Vienna	Men's singles
Gold medal – first place	1951 Zürich	Men's singles
Silver medal – second place	1950 Oslo	Men's singles
Bronze medal – third place	1949 Milan	Men's singles

Hellmut Seibt (25 June 1929 – 21 July 1992) was an Austrian figure skater. He was the 1952 Olympic silver medalist, 1951 World bronze medalist, a two-time European champion (1951–52), and three-time national champion.

== Personal life ==
Seibt was born on 25 June 1929 in Vienna. He married figure skater Inge Regner in March 1956. He died on 21 July 1992.

== Career ==
Seibt began skating at age four, having been advised to take up an outdoor activity after suffering pneumonia. He practiced at the Engelmann club in Hernals, Vienna, under the guidance of Rudolf Kutzer and Karl Schäfer.

Seibt was coached by Inge Lind-Solar after World War II. He won his first national medal, silver, in 1947. In 1948, he was sent to his first European Championships, where he placed seventh, and then competed at the 1948 Winter Olympics, finishing ninth. From 1946 to 1948, Seibt also competed in pair skating with Susi Giebisch. Together, they were three-time national silver medalists and competed at the 1948 Winter Olympics, placing 11th.

Seibt stepped onto a major international podium for the first time at the 1949 European Championships, winning the bronze medal. In 1950, he became the Austrian national champion and went on to take silver at Europeans.

Seibt won gold at the 1951 European Championships and bronze at the 1951 World Championships. After successfully defending his European title, he competed at his second Winter Olympics and won the silver medal. After retiring from competition in 1952, he performed for three years with the Wiener Eisrevue (Holiday on Ice).

Seibt coached in Vienna from 1955 to 1962, in Düsseldorf from 1962 to 1967, and in Milan from 1967 to 1972. His students included Hanna Eigel, Regine Heitzer, Trixi Schuba, Evelyn Rossoukhi-Schneider, Christa Jorda, Sissy Zehetmayer, Günter Anderl, Gerhard Hubmann, Ronald Koppelent, Peter Jonas, Claudia Kristofics-Binder, Helmut Kristofics-Binder, Diana Hinko / Heinz Döpfl, Petra Ruhrmann, Dagmar Lurz, Uschi Kessler, Rita Trapanese.

The Hellmut Seibt Memorial is an annual competition named after him.

== Results ==
=== Singles ===
International
Event	1947	1948	1949	1950	1951	1952
Winter Olympics		9th				2nd
World Championships		7th	5th	4th	3rd	4th
European Championships		7th	3rd	2nd	1st	1st
National
Austrian Championships	2nd	3rd	2nd	1st	1st	1st

=== Pairs with Giebisch ===
International
Event	1946	1947	1948
Winter Olympics			11th
World Championships			13th
European Championships			8th
National
Austrian Championships	2nd	2nd	2nd
