= Barbara Wyatt =

British figure skater

Personal information
- Born: Barbara Florence Amelia Wyatt; 17 July 1930 Brighton, England
- Died: 10 January 2012 (aged 81) Montreal, Quebec, Canada

Figure skating career
- Country: United Kingdom
- Coach: Jacques Gerschwiler (former)
- Retired: 1952
Medal record
Representing United Kingdom
Ladies' Figure skating
European Championships
Bronze medal – third place	1952 Vienna	Ladies' singles
Bronze medal – third place	1951 Zürich	Ladies' singles

Barbara Florence Amelia Wyatt Hardy (17 July 1930 – 10 January 2012) was a British figure skater who competed in ladies' singles. She was a two-time European bronze medalist (1951 and 1952) and finished seventh at the 1952 Winter Olympics. She was coached by Jacques Gerschwiler.

Wyatt is the mother of NHL hockey player Mark Hardy.

== Results ==
Event	1947	1948	1949	1950	1951	1952
Winter Olympics						7th
World Championships		16th	10th	10th	5th	5th
European Championships	12th	10th	8th	4th	3rd	3rd
