= Denise Favart =

French figure skater

Personal information
- Full name: Denise Hélène Gaudin
- Born: 22 September 1923 Paris
- Died: 22 August 2016 (aged 92) Cricquebœuf

Figure skating career
- Country: France
- Partner: Jacques Favart

Denise Helene Gaudin Favart (22 September 1923 – 22 August 2016) was a French figure skater. She was born in Paris, France. As a pair skater, she competed with her husband Jacques Favart from 1946 to 1950. They won the gold medal at the French Figure Skating Championships four times and placed 14th at the 1948 Winter Olympics.

== Competitive highlights ==
(with Jacques Favart)

Event	1946	1947	1948	1949	1950
Winter Olympic Games			14th		
World Championships		10th	WD	10th	12th
European Championships		8th			
French Championships	1st	1st	1st	1st	WD

- WD = Withdrawn
