= Bridget Adams =

British figure skater (1928–2019)

Personal information
- Full name: Bridget Shirley Adams
- Other names: Bengough (married surname)
- Born: 4 May 1928 London, England
- Died: 18 November 2019 (aged 91)

Figure skating career
- Country: United Kingdom
- Coach: Jacques Gerschwiler (former)

Bridget Shirley, Lady Bengough (née Adams; 4 May 1928 – 18 November 2019) was a British figure skater. She finished seventh at the 1948 Winter Olympics. Adams was coached by Jacques Gerschwiler. She married Sir Piers Bengough in 1952.

== Results ==
International
Event	1947	1948	1949
Winter Olympics		7th	
World Championships	8th	8th	5th
European Championships	9th	8th	6th
