= Jiřina Nekolová =

Czech figure skater

Personal information
- Born: 30 December 1931 Prague, Czechoslovakia
- Died: 25 May 2011 (aged 79) Kolín, Czech Republic

Figure skating career
- Country: Czechoslovakia
- Retired: 1950
Medal record
Representing Czechoslovakia
Figure skating: Ladies' singles
World Championships
Bronze medal – third place	1948 Davos	Ladies' singles

Jiřina Nekolová (30 December 1931 — 25 May 2011) was a Czech figure skater who competed for Czechoslovakia. She was the 1948 World bronze medalist and placed fourth at the 1948 Winter Olympics.

After turning professional she appeared on tour and on television in the UK and Australia in Ice Capers and Ice Cabaret in the early 1950s

== Results ==
International
Event	1946	1947	1948	1949	1950
Winter Olympics			4th		
World Championships		10th	3rd	4th	8th
European Championships		5th	4th	4th	
National
Czechoslovak Championships	2nd	2nd		2nd	
