= Figure skating at the 1952 Winter Olympics – Ladies' singles =

Figure skating at the Olympics

Women's singles at the VI Olympic Winter Games
- Figure skating
- Venues: Jordal Amfi (compulsory figure); Bislett stadion (free skating)
- Dates: 16–20 February 1952
- Competitors: 25 from 12 nations

Medalists
1st place, gold medalist(s)		Jeannette Altwegg; Great Britain
2nd place, silver medalist(s)		Tenley Albright; United States
3rd place, bronze medalist(s)		Jacqueline du Bief; France

The ladies' individual skating event was held as part of the figure skating at the 1952 Winter Olympics. It was the eighth appearance of the event, which had previously been held twice at the Summer Olympics in 1908 and 1920 and at all five Winter Games from 1924 onward. The competition was held from 16 to 20 February 1952. Twenty-five figure skaters from twelve nations competed.

== Results ==
Rank	Name	Nation	CF	FS	Points	Places
1	Jeannette Altwegg	Great Britain	1	4	161.756	14
2	Tenley Albright	United States	2	3	159.133	22
3	Jacqueline du Bief	France	4	2	158.000	24
4	Sonya Klopfer	United States	3	5	154.633	36
5	Virginia Baxter	United States	8	1	152.211	50
6	Suzanne Morrow	Canada	6	7	149.333	56
7	Barbara Wyatt	Great Britain	5	11	148.378	63
8	Gundi Busch	Germany	10	6	146.289	75
9	Marlene Smith	Canada	11	9	143.289	92
10	Erika Kraft	Germany	9	10	143.767	89
11	Valda Osborn	Great Britain	7	13	144.767	89
12	Helga Dudzinski	Germany	12	8	142.767	103
13	Vera Smith	Canada	13	15	138.220	117
14	Nancy Burley	Australia	17	14	135.633	135
15	Susi Wirz	Switzerland	15	17	135.578	136
16	Annelies Schilhan	Austria	19	12	134.744	140
17	Patricia Devries	Great Britain	14	20	132.811	148
18	Yolande Jobin	Switzerland	16	16	132.478	151
19	Sissy Schwarz	Austria	22	18	126.878	178
20	Leena Pietilä	Finland	20	21	124.733	185
21	Gweneth Molony	Australia	18	22	124.344	190
22	Alida Stoppelman	Netherlands	21	23	123.544	193
23	Eszter Jurek	Hungary	24	19	121.478	199
24	Ingeborg Nilsson	Norway	25	24	113.322	215
WD	Bjørg Løhner Øien	Norway	23			

Referee:

- (United Kingdom) Kenneth M. Beaumont

Assistant Referee:

- (Norway) Karen Klæboe

Judges:

- (United States) Harold G. Storke
- (United Kingdom) Joseph Wilson
- (West Germany) Fritz Schober
- (Switzerland) Henri Mügeli
- (Norway) Per Reiertsen
- (Canada) Donald H. Gilchrist
- (Austria) Franz Heinlein
- (Finland) Martti Gyldén
- (France) Gérard Rodrigues Henriques
