= 1952 European Figure Skating Championships =

Figure skating competition

1952 European Championships
- Type: ISU Championship
- Date: February 4 – 6
- Season: 1951–52
- Location: Vienna, Austria

Champions
- Men's singles: (Austria) Helmut Seibt
- Ladies' singles: (United Kingdom) Jeannette Altwegg
- Pairs: (West Germany) Ria Baran / Paul Falk
- Previous: 1951 European Championships
- Next: 1953 European Championships

The 1952 European Figure Skating Championships were held in Vienna, Austria from February 4 to 6. Elite senior-level figure skaters from European ISU member nations competed for the title of European Champion in the disciplines of men's singles, ladies' singles, and pair skating.

== Results ==
=== Men ===
Rank	Name	Places
1	(Austria) Helmut Seibt	
2	(Italy) Carlo Fassi	
3	(United Kingdom) Michael Carrington	
4	(France) Alain Giletti	
5	(Austria) Martin Felsenreich	
6	(West Germany) Freimut Stein	
7	(Czechoslovakia) Zdeněk Fikar	
8	(Hungary) György Czakó	
9	(Switzerland) Fritz Loosli	
10	(West Germany) Klaus Loichinger	

=== Ladies ===
Rank	Name	Places
1	(United Kingdom) Jeannette Altwegg	
2	(France) Jacqueline du Bief	
3	(United Kingdom) Barbara Wyatt	
4	(West Germany) Erika Kraft	
5	(West Germany) Helga Dudzinski	
6	(United Kingdom) Valda Osborn	
7	(Czechoslovakia) Dagmar Lerchová	
8	(West Germany) Gundi Busch	
9	(Austria) Eva Weidler	
10	(Austria) Annelies Schilhan	
11	(United Kingdom) Erica Batchelor	
12	(Czechoslovakia) Miloslava Tumová	
13	(Switzerland) Suzanne Wirz	
14	(Switzerland) Yolande Jobin	
15	(Austria) Ghislaine Kopf	
16	(United Kingdom) Patricia Devries	
17	(Czechoslovakia) Jarmila Königová	
18	(United Kingdom) Yvonne Sugden	
19	(Austria) Relly Majdan	
20	(West Germany) Rosi Pettinger	
21	(Netherlands) Lidy Stoppelman	
22	(Hungary) Eszter Jurek	
WD	(Finland) Leena Pietilä	DNS

=== Pairs ===
Rank	Name	Places
1	(West Germany) Ria Baran / Paul Falk	
2	(United Kingdom) Jennifer Nicks / John Nicks	
3	(Hungary) Marianna Nagy / László Nagy	20
4	(Switzerland) Silvia Grandjean / Michel Grandjean	
5	(United Kingdom) Peri Horne / Raymond Lockwood	
6	(Czechoslovakia) Soňa Buriánová / Miloslav Balun	
7	(Austria) Sissy Schwarz / Kurt Oppelt	
8	(Hungary) Éva Szöllősi / Gábor Vida	
9	(Socialist Federal Republic of Yugoslavia) Silva Palme / Marco Lajović	
