= 1951 World Figure Skating Championships =

Annual figure skating competition held in 1951

- Type: ISU Championship
- Date: February 23 – 25
- Season: 1951
- Location: Milan, Italy
- Venue: Palazzo del Ghiaccio

Champions
- Men's singles: (United States) Richard Button
- Ladies' singles: (United Kingdom) Jeannette Altwegg
- Pairs: (West Germany) Ria Baran / Paul Falk
- Previous: 1950 World Championships
- Next: 1952 World Championships

The World Figure Skating Championships is an annual figure skating competition sanctioned by the International Skating Union in which figure skaters compete for the title of World Champion.

The 1951 championships took place on February 23–25 in Milan, Italy. It was the first year after World War II that athletes from Germany and Japan were allowed to compete at Worlds.

== Medal table ==
* Host nation (Italy)

Rank	Nation	Gold	Silver	Bronze	Total
1	United States	1	2	1	4
2	Great Britain	1	0	1	2
3	West Germany	1	0	0	1
4	France	0	1	0	1
5	Austria	0	0	1	1
Totals (5 entries)		3	3	3	9

== Results ==
=== Men ===
Rank	Name	CF	FS	Total	Places
1	(United States) Dick Button	104.38	79.33	183.71	7
2	(United States) James Grogan	93.11	77.58	170.69	17
3	(Austria) Helmut Seibt	94.08	74.78	168.86	22
4	(United States) Hayes Jenkins	90.80	77.35	168.15	25
5	(United States) Dudley Richards	85.63	70.93	156.56	38
6	(Italy) Carlo Fassi	84.45	72.22	156.67	41
7	(United States) Don Laws	81.92	68.60	150.52	48
8	(United Kingdom) Michael Carrington	83.88	64.05	147.93	54
9	(Canada) William Lewis	76.63	56.35	132.98	67
10	(West Germany) Freimut Stein	74.00	58.10	132.10	69
11	(Japan) Ryusuke Arisaka	73.30	56.10	129.40	74

Judges:

- (Canada) Donald Gilchrist
- (Switzerland) Eugen Kirchhofer
- (United Kingdom) Mollie Phillips
- (United States) Walter Powell
- (Austria) Adolf Rosdol
- (West Germany) W. Schilling
- (Italy) Mario Verdi

=== Ladies ===
Rank	Name	CF	FS	Total	Places
1	(United Kingdom) Jeannette Altwegg	114.73	77.99	192.72	8
2	(France) Jacqueline du Bief	106.67	82.00	188.67	14
3	(United States) Sonya Klopfer	104.90	80.79	185.69	23
4	(Canada) Suzanne Morrow	105.67	78.96	184.63	29
5	(United Kingdom) Barbara Wyatt	104.67	74.58	179.25	42
6	(United States) Tenley Albright	99.25	79.81	179.06	43
7	(United States) Andra McLaughlin	100.43	77.87	178.30	47
8	(United States) Margaret Graham	100.10	76.89	176.99	53
9	(United Kingdom) Valda Osborn	98.03	76.41	174.44	56
10	(West Germany) Gundi Busch	88.67	76.28	164.95	83
11	(United States) Frances Dorsey	91.70	73.12	164.82	85
12	(West Germany) Helga Dudzinski	87.62	75.31	162.93	89*
13	(Canada) Elizabeth Hiscock	91.88	70.93	162.81	89*
14	(West Germany) Erika Kraft	88.63	74.70	163.33	87
15	(Switzerland) Susi Wirz	91.47	69.59	161.06	94
16	(Austria) Lotte Schwenk	84.82	66.92	151.74	116
17	(Switzerland) Yolande Jobin	85.88	64.00	149.88	118
18	(Switzerland) Ghislaine Kopf	85.70	59.98	145.68	129
19	(United Kingdom) Yvonne Sugden	80.30	65.21	145.51	131
20	(West Germany) Inge Jell	74.85	62.05	136.90	141
21	(Japan) Etsuko Inada	81.29	54.02	135.31	144
22	(Netherlands) Lidy Stoppelman	77.56	53.70	131.26	150
23	(Austria) Grete Dunst	70.45	47.33	117.78	161

*: better placed due to the majority of the better placings

Judges:

- (United Kingdom) Pamela Davis
- (Switzerland) Emile Finsterwald
- (Canada) Donald Gilchrist
- (Austria) Oskar Madl
- (West Germany) O. Maly
- (United States) Harold G. Storke
- (France) Georges Torchon

=== Pairs ===
Rank	Name	Points	Places
1	(West Germany) Ria Baran / Paul Falk	10.89	10
2	(United States) Karol Kennedy / Peter Kennedy	10.85	11.5
3	(United Kingdom) Jennifer Nicks / John Nicks	10.51	20.5
4	(Switzerland) Eliane Steinemann / André Calame	10.07	35
5	(West Germany) Inge Minor / Hermann Braun	9.92	40
6	(West Germany) Marlies Schrör / Hans Schwarz	9.81	45
7	(Switzerland) Silvia Grandjean / Michel Grandjean	9.48	50
8	(United States) Janet Gerhauser / John Nightingale	9.46	53
9	(Socialist Federal Republic of Yugoslavia) Silva Palme / Marko Lajović	9.19	65
10	(Austria) Elly Stärck / Harry Gareis	8.96	65
11	(United States) Anne Holt / Austin Holt	8.99	68
12	(United Kingdom) Elizabeth Williams / John McCann	7.94	83

Judges:

- (Italy) Bruno Bonfiglio
- (Canada) Donald Gilchrist
- (Switzerland) Eugen Kirchhofer
- (Austria) Hans Meixner
- (United Kingdom) Mollie Phillips
- (West Germany) W. Schilling
- (United States) Harold G. Storke

=== Ice Dance (unofficial) ===
Rank	Name	Places
1	(United Kingdom) Jean Westwood / Lawrence Demmy	
2	(United Kingdom) Joan Dewhirst / John Slater	
3	(United States) Lois Waring / Michael McGean	
