= 1951 European Figure Skating Championships =

Figure skating competition

1951 European Championships
- Type: ISU Championship
- Date: February 2 – 4
- Season: 1950–51
- Location: Zürich, Switzerland

Champions
- Men's singles: (Austria) Helmut Seibt
- Ladies' singles: (United Kingdom) Jeannette Altwegg
- Pairs: (West Germany) Ria Baran / Paul Falk
- Previous: 1950 European Championships
- Next: 1952 European Championships

The 1951 European Figure Skating Championships were held in Zürich, Switzerland from February 2 to 4. Elite senior-level figure skaters from European ISU member nations competed for the title of European Champion in the disciplines of men's singles, ladies' singles, and pair skating.

It was the first time German skaters competed internationally since the end of World War II.

== Results ==
=== Men ===
Rank	Name	Places
1	(Austria) Helmut Seibt	
2	(West Germany) Horst Faber	
3	(Italy) Carlo Fassi	
4	(United Kingdom) Michael Carrington	
5	(West Germany) Freimut Stein	
6	(Switzerland) François Pache	
7	(Austria) Martin Felsenreich	
8	(Switzerland) Fritz Loosli	

=== Ladies ===
Rank	Name	Places
1	(United Kingdom) Jeannette Altwegg	
2	(France) Jacqueline du Bief	
3	(United Kingdom) Barbara Wyatt	
4	(United Kingdom) Valda Osborn	
5	(United Kingdom) Beryl Bailey	
6	(West Germany) Gundi Busch	
7	(West Germany) Helga Dudzinski	
8	(Austria) Lotte Schwenk	
9	(Switzerland) Suzanne Wirz	
10	(West Germany) Inge Jell	
11	(Switzerland) Yolande Jobin	
12	(Austria) Ghislaine Kopf	
13	(Finland) Leena Pietilä	
14	(Sweden) Gun Ericson	
15	(Netherlands) Lidy Stoppelman	
16	(Norway) Bjørg Løhner	
17	(Netherlands) Rietje van Erkel	
18	(Netherlands) Yvonne Ruts	

=== Pairs ===
Rank	Name	Places
1	(West Germany) Ria Baran / Paul Falk	
2	(Switzerland) Eliane Steinemann / André Calame	
3	(United Kingdom) Jennifer Nicks / John Nicks	
4	(Switzerland) Silvia Grandjean / Michel Grandjean	
5	(West Germany) Inge Minor / Hermann Braun	
6	(Austria) Elly Stärck / Harry Gareis	
7	(West Germany) Marlies Schrör / Hans Schwarz	
8	(United Kingdom) Elizabeth Williams / John McCann	
9	(Socialist Federal Republic of Yugoslavia) Silva Palme / Marco Lajović	
10	(United Kingdom) Doris Clayden / Ronald Clayden	
