= John Nicks Pairs Challenge =

International figure skating competition

- Genre: ISU Challenger Series
- Frequency: Annual
- Venue: Sky Rink at Chelsea Piers
- Location: New York City, New York
- Country: United States
- Inaugurated: 2021
- Previous event: 2026 John Nicks International Pairs Competition
- Organizer: Skating Club of New York, Skating Club of Boston & U.S. Figure Skating

The John Nicks Pairs Challenge is an annual pairs figure skating competition sanctioned by the International Skating Union (ISU). It is organized and hosted by the Skating Club of New York and U.S. Figure Skating at the Sky Rink at Chelsea Piers in New York City, New York, in the United States. The competition debuted in 2021, and is named in honor of John Nicks, a retired British figure skater who worked as a figure skating coach in the United States for nearly four decades. In 2024, it became part of the Challenger Series. Medals are awarded in pair skating at the senior and junior levels; when the event is part of the Challenger Series, skaters earn points towards the World Standings and Season's World Ranking based on their results.

== History ==
The competition is named in honor of John Nicks, a retired figure skater who competed for Great Britain in single skating and later pair skating with his sister Jennifer. They are four-time World Championship medalists (gold in 1953, silver in 1950, and bronze in 1951 and 1952); four-time European Championship medalists (gold in 1953, silver in 1952, and bronze in 1950 and 1951); and six-time British national champions (1948–1953). After the crash of Sabena Flight 548 in 1961, in which most of the U.S. national figure skating team was killed, Nicks chose to emigrate to the United States to work as a coach and help rebuild the American skating program. He had been impressed by the American skaters he watched at the 1948 Winter Olympics, which helped influence his decision to move to the United States. Nicks was inducted into the World Figure Skating Hall of Fame in 2000. He coached an estimated 1,200 skaters during a career than spanned more than four decades, including Tai Babilonia and Randy Gardner, JoJo Starbuck and Kenneth Shelley, Jenni Meno and Todd Sand, Sasha Cohen, and Ashley Wagner.

The inaugural edition of the John Nicks Pairs Challenge was held in 2021. Alexa Knierim and Brandon Frazier of the United States were the champions. In 2024, the John Nicks Pairs Challenge – now called the John Nicks International Pairs Competition – was the second event of the ISU Challenger Series, a series of international figure skating competitions sanctioned by the International Skating Union (ISU). The objective is to ensure consistent organization and structure within a series of international competitions linked together, providing opportunities for senior-level skaters to compete at the international level and also earn points towards the World Standings and Season's World Ranking. When an event is held as part of the Challenger Series, it must host at least three of the four disciplines (men's singles, women's singles, pair skating, and ice dance) and representatives from at least ten different ISU member nations. The minimum number of entrants required for each discipline is eight skaters each in men's singles and women's singles, five teams in pair skating, and six teams in ice dance. Each ISU member nation is eligible to enter up to three skaters or teams per discipline in each competition, although the U.S. Figure Skating may enter an unlimited number of entrants in their own event. The John Nicks Pairs Challenge is held in conjunction with the Cranberry Cup International – the former hosts the pairs event, while the latter hosts the men's and women's events – and the two competitions constitute the U.S. Figure Skating's contribution to the Challenger Series.

== Senior medalists ==
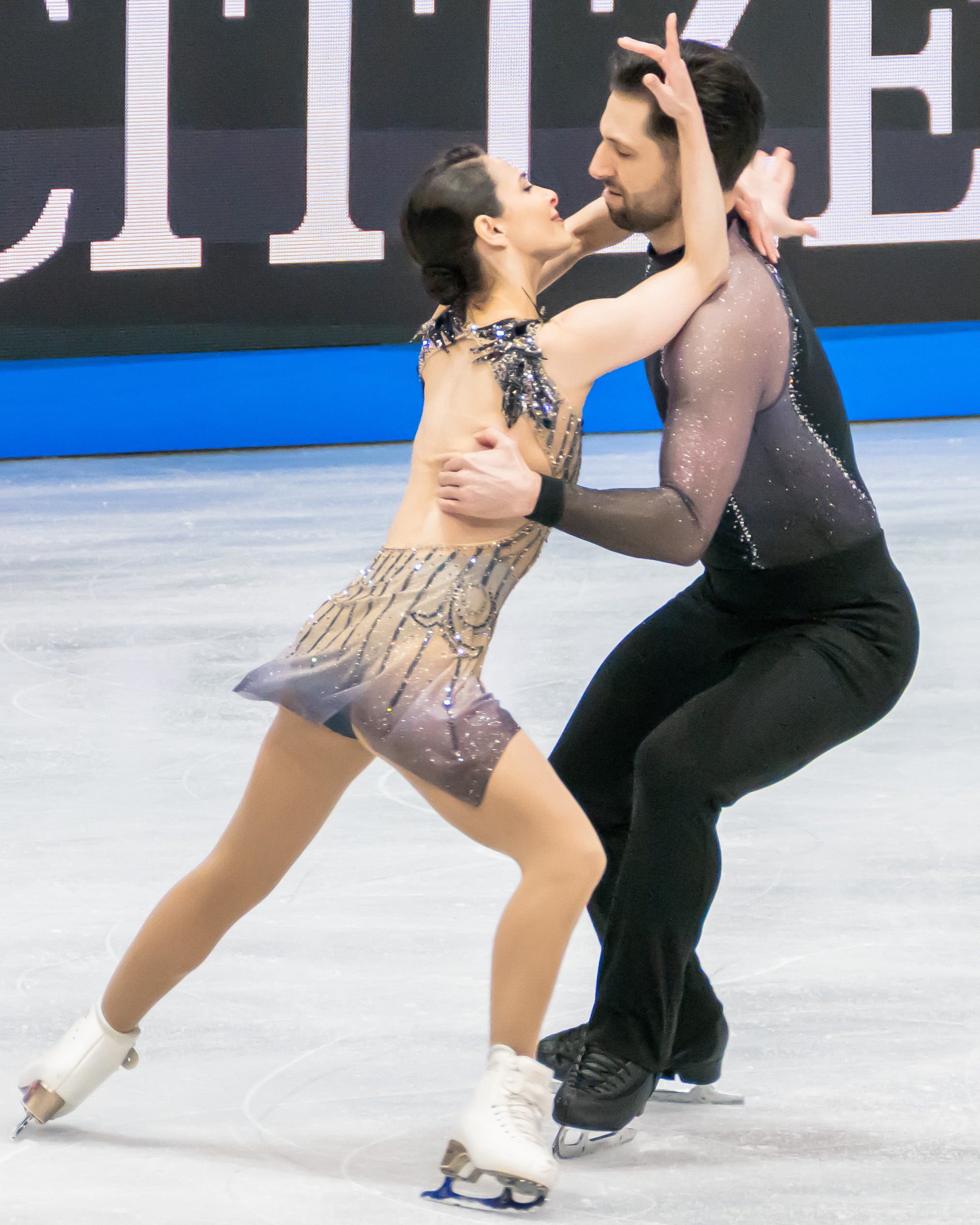
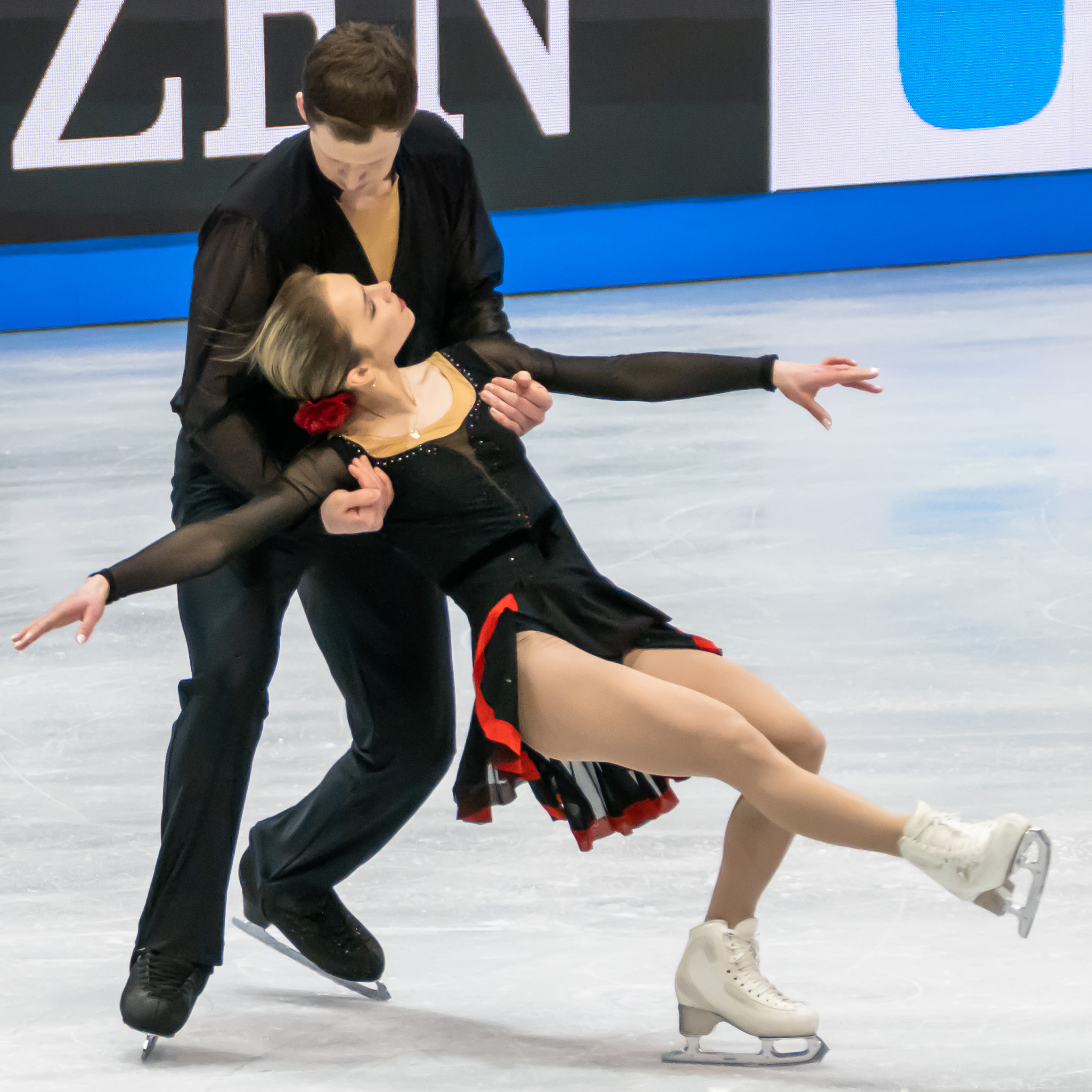
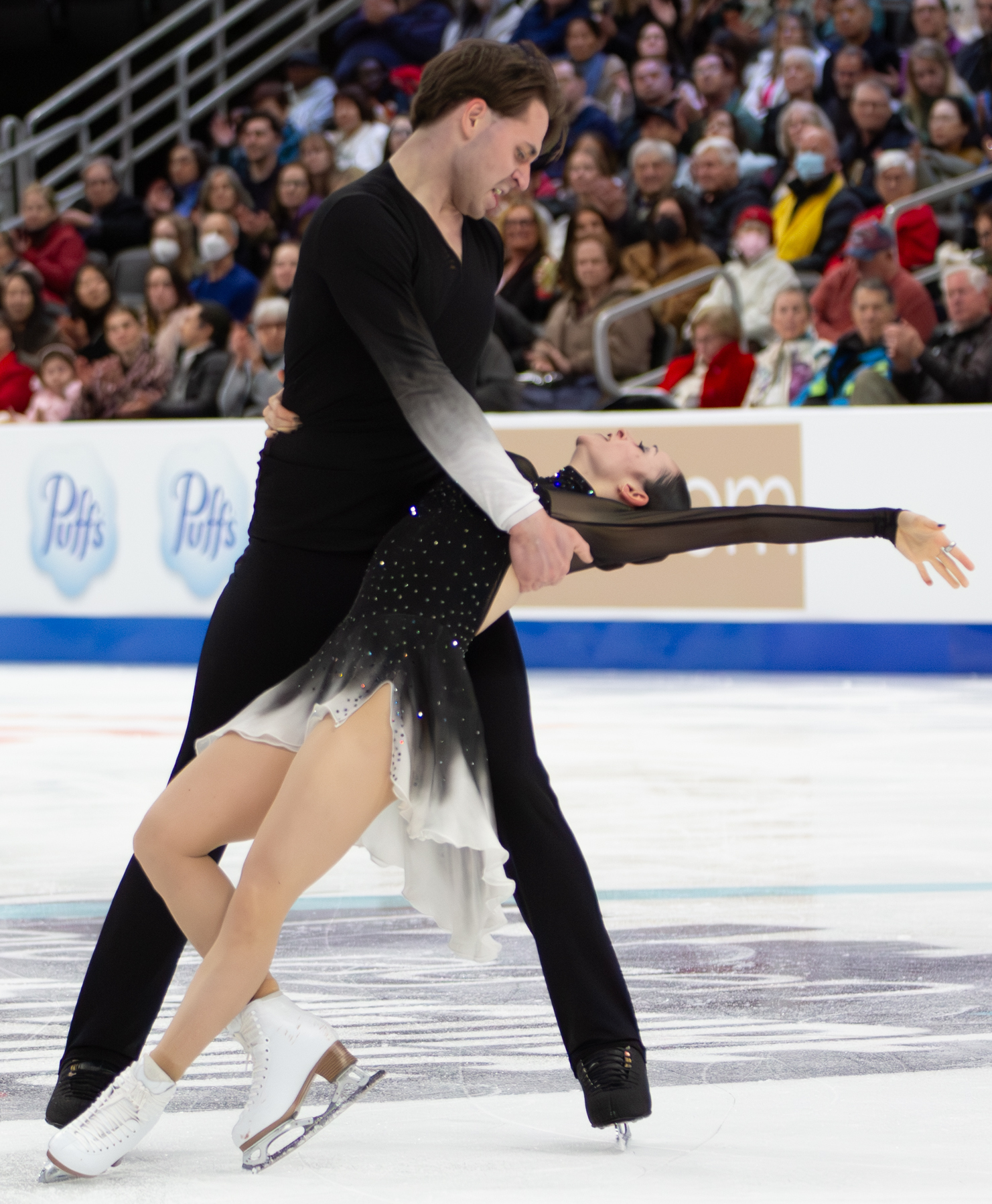
The 2025 John Nicks International Pairs Competition medalists: (from left to right): Deanna Stellato-Dudek and Maxime Deschamps of Canada (gold); Alisa Efimova and Misha Mitrofanov of the United States (silver); and Katie McBeath and Daniil Parkman of the United States (bronze)

CS: Challenger Series event

Senior event medalists
Year	Gold	Silver	Bronze	Ref.
2021	(United States); Alexa Knierim; Brandon Frazier	(United States); Jessica Calalang; Brian Johnson	(United States); Audrey Lu; Misha Mitrofanov	
2022	(Italy); Rebecca Ghilardi; Filippo Ambrosini	(United States); Emily Chan; Spencer Howe	(United States); Valentina Plazas; Maximiliano Fernandez	
2023	(France); Camille Kovalev; Pavel Kovalev	(Italy); Anna Valesi; Manuel Piazza	(United States); Valentina Plazas; Maximiliano Fernandez	
2024 CS	(United States); Ellie Kam; Daniel O'Shea	(United States); Alisa Efimova; Misha Mitrofanov	(Uzbekistan); Ekaterina Geynish; Dmitrii Chigirev	
2025 CS	(Canada); Deanna Stellato-Dudek; Maxime Deschamps	(United States); Alisa Efimova; Misha Mitrofanov	(United States); Katie McBeath; Daniil Parkman	
2026 CS	(Individual Neutral Athletes); Aleksandra Boikova; Dmitrii Kozlovskii	(United States); Audrey Shin; Spencer Akira Howe	(United States); Katie McBeath; Balázs Nagy	

== Junior medalists ==
Junior event medalists
Year	Gold	Silver	Bronze	Ref.
2021	(Canada); Chloe Panetta; Kieran Thrasher	(United States); Cate Fleming; Chase Finster	(United States); Laiken Lockley; Jedidiah Isbell	
2022	(United States); Ellie Korytek; Timmy Chapman	(United States); Catherine Rivers; Nathan Rensing	(United States); Lilanna Murray; Jordan Gillette	
2023	(United States); Saya Carpenter; Jon Maravilla	(Israel); Sofia Enkina; Nikita Kovalenko	(United States); Ashley Fletcher; Aaron Felberbaum	
2024	(United States); Reagan Moss; Jakub Galbavy	(United States); Addyson McDanold; Aaron Felberbaum	(United Kingdom); Neamh Davison; Daniel Borisov	
2025	(United States); Reagan Moss; Jakub Galbavy	(Ukraine); Hannah Herrera; Ivan Khobta	(United Kingdom); Neamh Davison; Daniel Borisov	
2026	No junior-level competition held			

== Cumulative medal count (senior medalists) ==
Total number of John Nicks Pairs Challenge medals by nation
Rank	Nation	Gold	Silver	Bronze	Total
1	United States	2	5	5	12
2	Italy	1	1	0	2
3	Canada	1	0	0	1
3	France	1	0	0	1
3	Individual Neutral Athletes	1	0	0	1
6	Uzbekistan	0	0	1	1
Totals (6 entries)		6	6	6	18
