= 1952 World Figure Skating Championships =

Annual figure skating competition held in 1952

- Type: ISU Championship
- Date: February 27 – March 1
- Season: 1952
- Location: Paris, France

Champions
- Men's singles: (United States) Richard Button
- Ladies' singles: (France) Jacqueline du Bief
- Pairs: (West Germany) Ria Baran / Paul Falk
- Ice dance: (United Kingdom) Jean Westwood / Lawrence Demmy
- Previous: 1951 World Championships
- Next: 1953 World Championships

The World Figure Skating Championships is an annual figure skating competition sanctioned by the International Skating Union in which figure skaters compete for the title of World Champion.

The 1952 competitions for men, ladies, pair skating, and ice dancing took place from February 27 to March 1 in Paris, France. The World Championships in ice dancing were the first of its kind.

== Medal table ==
* Host nation (France)

Rank	Nation	Gold	Silver	Bronze	Total
1	United States	1	3	3	7
2	Great Britain	1	1	1	3
3	France*	1	0	0	1
3	West Germany	1	0	0	1
Totals (4 entries)		4	4	4	12

== Results ==
=== Men ===
Rank	Name	Places
1	(United States) Dick Button	7
2	(United States) James Grogan	19
3	(United States) Hayes Jenkins	21
4	(Austria) Helmut Seibt	25
5	(United States) Dudley Richards	34
6	(Italy) Carlo Fassi	44
7	(Canada) Peter Firstbrook	46
8	(France) Alain Giletti	57
9	(Austria) Martin Felsenreich	66
10	(Australia) Adrian Swan	67
11	(Switzerland) François Pache	76

Judges:

- (Switzerland) Jakob Biedermann
- (Italy) Ercole Cattaneo
- (Canada) Donald Gilchrist
- (Austria) Oskar Madl
- (France) Gérard Rodrigues-Henriques
- (United States) Harold G. Storke
- (United Kingdom) J. Wilson

=== Ladies ===
Rank	Name	Places
1	(France) Jacqueline du Bief	9
2	(United States) Sonya Klopfer	21
3	(United States) Virginia Baxter	24
4	(Canada) Suzanne Morrow	43
5	(United Kingdom) Barbara Wyatt	55
6	(West Germany) Gundi Busch	59
7	(Canada) Marlene Smith	64
8	(United Kingdom) Valda Osborn	65
9	(United Kingdom) Erica Batchelor	82
10	(Canada) Vera Smith	90
11	(West Germany) Helga Dudzinski	96
12	(United Kingdom) Patricia Devries	110
13	(Austria) Eva Weidler	123
14	(Austria) Annelies Schilhan	132
15	(Australia) Nancy Hallam-Burley	129
16	(Switzerland) Ghislaine Kopf	124
17	(Netherlands) Lidy Stoppelman	158
18	(Switzerland) Yolande Jobin	161
19	(Australia) Gweneth Molony	170
20	(Switzerland) Doris Zerbe	175
21	(Belgium) Liliane de Becker	192
22	(Belgium) Nicole Vanderberghe	195
WD	(United States) Tenley Albright	DNS

Judges:

- (Italy) Ercole Cattaneo
- (Canada) Norman V. S. Gregory
- (West Germany) V. P. Gross
- (Switzerland) Eugen Kirchhofer
- (United States) Alex Krupy
- (United Kingdom) Mollie Phillips
- (France) Gérard Rodrigues-Henriques
- (Belgium) A. Voordeckers
- (Austria) Franz Wojtanowskyj

=== Pairs ===
Rank	Name	Places
1	(West Germany) Ria Baran / Paul Falk	9
2	(United States) Karol Kennedy / Peter Kennedy	23.5
3	(United Kingdom) Jennifer Nicks / John Nicks	29
4	(Canada) Frances Dafoe / Norris Bowden	31.5
5	(United States) Janet Gerhauser / John Nightingale	48.5
6	(Switzerland) Silvia Grandjean / Michel Grandjean	49.5
7	(Austria) Sissy Schwarz / Kurt Oppelt	68
8	(United States) Caryl Johns / Jack Jost	72
9	(Australia) Jacqueline Mason / Mervyn Bower	81
10	(United Kingdom) Peri Horne / Raymond Lockwood	83

Judges:

- (Switzerland) J. Biedermann
- (Italy) Ercole Cattaneo
- (United Kingdom) Pamela Davis
- (Canada) Donald Gilchrist
- (West Germany) V. P. Gross
- (Netherlands) A. W. Knetemann
- (United States) Alex Krupy
- (Austria) Hans Meixner
- (France) Gérard Rodrigues-Henriques

=== Ice dance ===
Rank	Name	Places
1	(United Kingdom) Jean Westwood / Lawrence Demmy	7
2	(United Kingdom) Joan Dewhirst / John Slater	14
3	(United States) Carol Peters / Daniel Ryan	23
4	(United States) Carmel Bodel / Edward Bodel	26
5	(Netherlands) Lydia Boon / Aadrian van Dam	35
6	(Austria) Ilse Reitmayer / Hans Kutschera	44
7	(Netherlands) Catharina Odink / Jacobus Odink	54
8	(Switzerland) Albertina Brown / Nigel Brown	54
9	(Austria) Paulin Haffner / Herbert Huber	58

Judges:

- (Canada) Norman V. S. Gregory
- (Switzerland) Eugen Kirchhofer
- (Austria) Hans Meixner
- (France) Henri Meudec
- (United Kingdom) Mollie Phillips
- (United States) R. Sackett
- (Belgium) A. Voordeckers

== Sources ==
- Result List provided by the ISU
