= 1952 in sports =

1952 in sports describes the year's events in world sport.

== American football ==
- NFL Championship: the Detroit Lions won 17–7 over the Cleveland Browns at Cleveland Stadium
- Sugar Bowl (1951 season):
  - The Tennessee Volunteers lose 28–13 to the Maryland Terrapins; still awarded the national championship by the AP and Coaches Poll
- 1952 college football season:
  - The Michigan State Spartans win the college football national championship (don't play in a bowl game the following January)

== Association football ==
England

- First Division – Manchester United win the 1951–52 title.
- FA Cup – Newcastle United beat Arsenal 1–0.

Spain

- La Liga won by Barcelona.

Italy

- Serie A won by Juventus.

Germany

- German football championship won by VfB Stuttgart.

France

- French Division 1 won by OGC Nice.

Portugal

- Primeira Liga won by Sporting C.P.

== Australian rules football ==
Victorian Football League

- June 14: In an effort to promote the code outside its traditional strongholds in the southern and western states, the League holds a “National Day Round” of matches in selected interstate and country venues: Albury, Euroa, Yallourn, Sydney, Brisbane and Hobart. Despite flooding rains, attendances were high enough to deem the venture a success though it was never repeated.
- Geelong wins the 56th VFL Premiership by defeating Collingwood 13.8 (86) to 5.10 (40) in the 1952 VFL Grand Final
- Brownlow Medal awarded to Roy Wright (Richmond) and Bill Hutchison (Essendon)^{[a]}

South Australian National Football League

- October 4: North Adelaide beat Norwood 23.15 (153) to 6.9 (45) in the most one-sided SANFL Grand Final until 2004.
- Magarey Medal awarded to Len Fitzgerald (Sturt)

Western Australian National Football League

- October 11: South Fremantle win their sixth premiership beating West Perth 12.19 (91) to 10.10 (70)
- Sandover Medal awarded to Steve Marsh (South Fremantle)

== Baseball ==
- January 31 – The Hall of Fame elects two new members – Harry Heilmann, with 203 votes, and Paul Waner with 195. Waner, a .333 career hitter, rapped out 3,152 hits and struck out just 376 times in 9,459 career at–bats. Heilmann was similarly skilled with the bat, winning four batting titles with the Tigers and finishing his career with a .342 average
- World Series – New York Yankees win 4 games to 3 over the Brooklyn Dodgers

== Basketball ==
- NCAA Men's Basketball Championship –
  - Kansas wins 80–63 over St. John's

NBA Finals

- Minneapolis Lakers over New York Knicks (4–3)

Spain

- Saski Baskonia was founded in Vitoria Gasteiz on December 3.

== Boxing ==
- June 25 at Yankee Stadium, Joey Maxim defeats Sugar Ray Robinson by knockout to retain his world light heavyweight title. This is the only knockout Robinson would ever suffer.
- August 11 – death in a road accident of Dave Sands (26), Australian Aborigine middleweight rated third in the world at the time
- September 23 at Philadelphia, Rocky Marciano knocked out Jersey Joe Walcott in the 13th round to win the World Heavyweight Championship.

== Canadian football ==
- Grey Cup – Toronto Argonauts win 21–11 over the Edmonton Eskimos

== Cricket ==
Events

- 16 October–18 October, Delhi – Pakistan plays its first Test match, against India. India won by an innings and 70 runs.

England

- County Championship – Surrey
- Minor Counties Championship – Buckinghamshire
- Most runs – Len Hutton 2567 @ 61.11 (HS 189)
- Most wickets – Johnny Wardle 172 @ 19.27 (BB 7–49)
- Wisden Cricketers of the Year – Fred Trueman, Harold Gimblett, Tom Graveney, David Sheppard, Stuart Surridge
- India make a fourth tour of England, and lose the four-Test series three games to nil

Australia

- Sheffield Shield – New South Wales
- Most runs – Lindsay Hassett 855 @ 61.07 (HS 229)
- Most wickets – Bill Johnston 54 @ 20.62 (BB 7–114)
- The West Indies make a second tour of Australia, losing as in the first four Tests to one

India

- Ranji Trophy – Bombay
- England make a second tour of India, drawing the five-test series with one victory each and three draws

New Zealand

- Plunket Shield – Canterbury

South Africa

- Currie Cup – Transvaal

== Cycling ==
- Giro d'Italia won by Fausto Coppi of Italy
- Tour de France – Fausto Coppi of Italy
- UCI Road World Championships – Men's road race – Heinz Müller of Germany

== Field hockey ==
- Olympic Games (Men's Competition) in Helsinki, Finland
  - Gold Medal: India
  - Silver Medal: The Netherlands
  - Bronze Medal: Great Britain

== Figure skating ==
- World Figure Skating Championships –
  - Men's champion: Dick Button, United States
  - Ladies’ champion: Jacqueline du Bief, France
  - Pair skating champions: Ria Falk & Paul Falk, Germany
  - Ice dancing champions: Jean Westwood & Lawrence Demmy, Great Britain
- In this year, ice dancing introduced as part of the World Figure Skating Championships.
- American defending champion Dick Button becomes first figure-skater to land a triple jump in competition; performs a triple loop in the Olympic free skate in Oslo

== Golf ==
Men's professional

- Masters Tournament – Sam Snead
- U.S. Open – Julius Boros
- PGA Championship – Jim Turnesa
- British Open – Bobby Locke
- PGA Tour money leader – Julius Boros – $37,033

Men's amateur

- British Amateur – Harvie Ward
- U.S. Amateur – Jack Westland

Women's professional

- Women's Western Open – Betsy Rawls
- U.S. Women's Open – Louise Suggs
- Titleholders Championship – Babe Zaharias
- LPGA Tour money leader – Betsy Rawls – $14,505

== Harness racing ==
- Little Brown Jug for pacers won by Meadow Rice
- Hambletonian for trotters won by Sharp Note
- Australian Inter Dominion Harness Racing Championship –
  - Pacers: Avian Derby

== Horse racing ==
Steeplechases

- Cheltenham Gold Cup – Mont Tremblant
- Grand National – Teal

Hurdle races

- Champion Hurdle – Sir Ken

Flat races

- Australia – Melbourne Cup won by Dalray
- Canada – Queen's Plate won by Epigram
- France – Prix de l'Arc de Triomphe won by Nuccio
- Ireland – Irish Derby Stakes won by Thirteen of Diamonds
- English Triple Crown Races:
  1. 2000 Guineas Stakes – Thunderhead
  2. The Derby – Tulyar
  3. St. Leger Stakes – Tulyar
- United States Triple Crown Races:
  1. Kentucky Derby – Hill Gail
  2. Preakness Stakes – Blue Man
  3. Belmont Stakes – One Count

== Ice hockey ==
- World Hockey Championship
  - Men's champion: Canada defeated the United States
- Stanley Cup – Detroit Red Wings win 4 games to 0 over the Montreal Canadiens
- Art Ross Trophy as the NHL's leading scorer during the regular season: Gordie Howe, Detroit Red Wings
- Hart Memorial Trophy – for the NHL's Most Valuable Player: Gordie Howe, Detroit Red Wings
- NCAA Men's Ice Hockey Championship – Michigan Wolverines defeat Colorado College Tigers 4–1 in Colorado Springs, Colorado
- November 1 – Hockey Night in Canada makes its television debut on CBC. It is the oldest sports-related TV program still airing.

== Professional wrestling ==
- WWE is founded by Roderick James "Jess" McMahon and Joseph Raymond "Toots" Mondt.

== Rugby league ==
- 1952–53 Kangaroo tour of Great Britain and France
- 1952–53 European Rugby League Championship / 1951–52 European Rugby League Championship
- 1952 New Zealand rugby league season
- 1952 NSWRFL season
- 1952–53 Northern Rugby Football League season / 1951–52 Northern Rugby Football League season

== Rugby union ==
- 58th Five Nations Championship series is won by Wales who complete the Grand Slam

== Skiing ==
- Alpine skiing
- Men's Olympic gold medals:
  - Downhill: Zeno Colò, Italy
  - Slalom: Othmar Schneider, Austria
  - Giant Slalom: Stein Eriksen, Norway
  - Women's Olympic gold medals:
  - Downhill: Trude Jochum-Beiser, Austria
  - Slalom: Andrea Mead Lawrence, United States
  - Giant Slalom: Andrea Mead Lawrence, United States

== Snooker ==
- Schism in snooker means two world championships are held:
  - World Snooker Championship (World Professional Match-play Championship): Fred Davis beats Walter Donaldson 38–35
  - World Snooker Championship (BACC event): Horace Lindrum beats Clark McConachy 94–49

== Speed skating ==
Speed Skating World Championships

- Men's All-round Champion – Hjalmar Andersen (Norway)

== Tennis ==
Australia

- Australian Men's Singles Championship – Ken McGregor (Australia) defeats Frank Sedgman (Australia) 7–5, 12–10, 2–6, 6–2
- Australian Women's Singles Championship – Thelma Coyne Long (Australia) defeats Helen Angwin (Australia) 6–2, 6–3

England

- Wimbledon Men's Singles Championship – Frank Sedgman (Australia) defeats Jaroslav Drobný (Egypt) 4–6, 6–2, 6–3, 6–2
- Wimbledon Women's Singles Championship – Maureen Connolly Brinker (USA) defeats Louise Brough Clapp (USA) 6–4, 6–3

France

- French Men's Singles Championship – Jaroslav Drobný (Egypt) defeats Frank Sedgman (Australia) 6–2, 6–0, 3–6, 6–4
- French Women's Singles Championship – Doris Hart (USA) defeats Shirley Fry Irvin (USA) 6–4, 6–4

USA

- American Men's Singles Championship – Frank Sedgman (Australia) defeats Gardnar Mulloy (USA) 6–1, 6–2, 6–3
- American Women's Singles Championship – Maureen Connolly (USA) defeats Doris Hart (USA) 6–3, 7–5

Davis Cup

- 1952 Davis Cup – Australia 4–1 United States at Memorial Drive Tennis Centre (grass) Adelaide, Australia

== Volleyball ==
- Men's World Championship in Moscow, Soviet Union
  - Gold Medal: Soviet Union
  - Silver Medal: Czechoslovakia
  - Bronze Medal: Bulgaria

== Olympic Games ==
- 1952 Summer Olympics takes place in Helsinki, Finland
  - United States wins the most medals (76), and the most gold medals (40).
  - Emil Zátopek wins marathon.
- 1952 Winter Olympics takes place in Oslo, Norway
  - Norway wins the most medals (16), and the most gold medals (7).

== Awards ==
- Associated Press Male Athlete of the Year – Bob Mathias, Track and field
- Associated Press Female Athlete of the Year – Maureen Connolly, Tennis

== Notes ==
^{a} Awarded retrospectively by the VFL in 1989.
