= Figure skating at the 1952 Winter Olympics – Pairs =

Figure skating at the Olympics

Pair skating at the VI Olympic Winter Games
- Venue: Jordal Amfi (compulsory); Bislett Stadion
- Date: 22 February 1952
- Competitors: 26 from 12 nations

Medalists
1st place, gold medalist(s)		Ria Baran / Paul Falk	Germany
2nd place, silver medalist(s)		Karol Kennedy / Peter Kennedy	United States
3rd place, bronze medalist(s)		Marianna Nagy / László Nagy	Hungary

The pair skating event was held as part of the figure skating at the 1952 Winter Olympics. It was the eighth appearance of the event, which had previously been held twice at the Summer Olympics in 1908 and 1920 and at all five Winter Games from 1924 onward. The competition was held on 22 February 1952. Twenty-six figure skaters from nine nations competed.

== Results ==
Rank	Name	Nation	Points	Places
1	Ria Baran / Paul Falk	Germany	11.400	11.5
2	Karol Kennedy / Peter Kennedy	United States	11.178	17.5
3	Marianna Nagy / László Nagy	Hungary	10.822	31
4	Jennifer Nicks / John Nicks	Great Britain	10.600	39
5	Frances Dafoe / Norris Bowden	Canada	10.489	48
6	Janet Gerhauser / John Nightingale	United States	10.289	54
7	Silvia Grandjean / Michel Grandjean	Switzerland	10.300	53
8	Inge Minor / Hermann Braun	Germany	9.089	73.5
9	Sissy Schwarz / Kurt Oppelt	Austria	9.469	83
10	Éva Szöllősi / Gábor Vida	Hungary	9.244	91.5
11	Peri Horne / Raymond Lockwood	Great Britain	9.133	94
12	Britta Lindmark / Ulf Berendt	Sweden	8.756	106
13	Bjørg Skjælaaen / Reidar Børjeson	Norway	8.346	117

Referee:

- (United States) Walter S. Powell

Assistant Referee:

- (Hungary) Elemér Terták

Judges:

- (Canada) Donald H. Gilchrist
- (United States) Harold G. Storke
- (Norway) Christen Christensen
- (United Kingdom) Pauline Barrajo
- (Switzerland) Henri Mügeli
- (West Germany) Fritz Schober
- (Sweden) Einar Törsleff
- (Hungary) László Szollás
- (Austria) Franz Wojtanowskyj
