= 1950 European Figure Skating Championships =

Figure skating competition

1950 European Championships
- Type: ISU Championship
- Date: February 17 – 19
- Season: 1949–50
- Location: Oslo, Norway
- Venue: Bislett Stadium

Champions
- Men's singles: (Hungary) Ede Király
- Ladies' singles: (Czechoslovakia) Alena Vrzáňová
- Pairs: (Hungary) Marianna Nagy / László Nagy
- Previous: 1949 European Championships
- Next: 1951 European Championships

The 1950 European Figure Skating Championships were held at the Bislett Stadium in Oslo, Norway from February 17 to 19. Elite senior-level figure skaters from European ISU member nations competed for the title of European Champion in the disciplines of men's singles, ladies' singles, and pair skating.

== Results ==
=== Men ===
Rank	Name	Places
1	(Hungary) Ede Király	7
2	(Austria) Helmut Seibt	
3	(Italy) Carlo Fassi	
4	(Czechoslovakia) Zdeněk Fikar	
5	(Switzerland) Kurt Sönning	
6	(Finland) Kalle Tuulos	
7	(Denmark) Per Cock-Clausen	

=== Ladies ===
Rank	Name	Places
1	(Czechoslovakia) Alena Vrzáňová	
2	(United Kingdom) Jeannette Altwegg	
3	(France) Jacqueline du Bief	
4	(United Kingdom) Barbara Wyatt	
5	(Czechoslovakia) Dagmar Lerchová	
6	(United Kingdom) Beryl Bailey	
7	(Switzerland) Regula Arnold	
8	(Czechoslovakia) Alexandra Černá	
9	(Czechoslovakia) Miloslava Tumová	
10	(Sweden) Gun Ericson	
11	(Switzerland) Suzanne Wirz	
12	(Switzerland) Yolande Jobin	
13	(Finland) Leena Pietilä	
14	(Norway) Bjørg Løhner	
15	(Norway) Ingeborg Nilsson	

=== Pairs ===
Rank	Name	Places
1	(Hungary) Marianna Nagy / László Nagy	6
2	(Switzerland) Eliane Steinemann / André Calame	
3	(United Kingdom) Jennifer Nicks / John Nicks	
4	(Czechoslovakia) Běla Zachova / Jaroslav Zach	
5	(Austria) Elly Stärck / Harry Gareis	
6	(Czechoslovakia) Soňa Buriánová / Miloslav Balun	
