= World Hall of Fame =

There are several World Halls of Fame in different sports or other activities.

- World Golf Hall of Fame
- World Figure Skating Hall of Fame
