= Sportsman of the Year (Germany) =

Annual award

The German Sportsman of the Year (German: Sportler des Jahres) has been chosen annually since 1947, with separate awards made for men and women. The record holder is tennis player Steffi Graf, who won five awards. Swimmer Michael Groß, tennis player Boris Becker, and high jumper Ulrike Meyfarth each have four awards. Since 1957 the sport journalists also vote for Germany's Sportsteam of the Year.

In East Germany (GDR) there was also an annual vote for the Best Sportsman of the Year and Best Sportswoman of the Year, from 1953 to 1989, chosen by the readers of the daily newspaper Junge Welt. After reunification in 1990, the East and West German awards merged into a single award.

The following are lists of the Sportperson of the Year.

== West Germany and Germany ==
Year	Male	Female	Team	Male (Disabled)	Female (Disabled)	Team (Disabled)
1947	Gottfried von Cramm	Marga Petersen
1948	Gottfried von Cramm	Mirl Buchner-Fischer
1949	Georg Meier	Lena Stumpf
1950	Herbert Klein	Ria Baran-Falk
1951	Paul Falk	Ria Baran-Falk
1952	Karl Kling	Ria Baran-Falk
1953	Werner Haas	Christa Seliger
1954	Heinz Fütterer	Ursula Happe
1955	Hans Günter Winkler	Helene Kienzle
1956	Hans Günter Winkler	Ursula Happe
1957	Manfred Germar	Wiltrud Urselmann	Borussia Dortmund
1958	Fritz Thiedemann	Marianne Werner
1959	Martin Lauer	Marika Kilius	Deutschland-Achter
1960	Georg Thoma	Ingrid Krämer	Deutschland-Achter
1961	Wolfgang von Trips	Heidi Schmid	1. FC Nürnberg
1962	Gerhard Hetz	Jutta Heine
1963	Gerhard Hetz	Ursel Brunner
1964	Willi Holdorf	Roswitha Esser; Annemarie Zimmermann
1965	Hans-Joachim Klein	Helga Hoffmann
1966	Rudi Altig	Helga Hoffmann; Karin Frisch
1967	Kurt Bendlin	Liesel Westermann	FC Bayern Munich
1968	Franz Keller	Ingrid Becker	Deutschland-Achter
1969	Hans Fassnacht	Liesel Westermann	Deutschland-Achter
1970	Hans Fassnacht	Heide Rosendahl	men's national football team
1971	Hans Fassnacht	Ingrid Mickler-Becker	Borussia Mönchengladbach
1972	Klaus Wolfermann	Heide Rosendahl	Germany men's national field hockey team
1973	Klaus Wolfermann	Uta Schorn	Bahnrad-Vierer
1974	Eberhard Gienger	Christel Justen	men's national football team
1975	Peter-Michael Kolbe	Ellen Wellmann	Borussia Mönchengladbach
1976	Gregor Braun	Rosi Mittermaier	Bahnrad-Vierer
1977	Dietrich Thurau	Eva Wilms	Germany Foil team
1978	Eberhard Gienger	Maria Epple	Germany men's national handball team
1979	Harald Schmid	Christa Kinshofer	TV Großwallstadt
1980	Guido Kratschmer	Irene Epple	men's national football team
1981	Toni Mang	Ulrike Meyfarth	men's national water polo team
1982	Michael Groß	Ulrike Meyfarth	Erwin Skamrahl, Harald Schmid, Thomas Giessing, Hartmut Weber (4 × 400 metres relay)
1983	Michael Groß	Ulrike Meyfarth	VfL Gummersbach
1984	Michael Groß	Ulrike Meyfarth	Germany Fencing team
1985	Boris Becker	Cornelia Hanisch	Germany Davis Cup team
1986	Boris Becker	Steffi Graf	Germany Fencing team
1987	Harald Schmid	Steffi Graf	Germany Fed Cup team
1988	Michael Groß	Steffi Graf	Deutschland-Achter
1989	Boris Becker	Steffi Graf	Deutschland-Achter
1990	Boris Becker	Katrin Krabbe	Germany national football team
1991	Michael Stich	Katrin Krabbe	1. FC Kaiserslautern
1992	Dieter Baumann	Heike Henkel	men's national field hockey team
1993	Henry Maske	Franziska van Almsick	men's national basketball team
1994	Markus Wasmeier	Katja Seizinger	Germany ski jumping team
1995	Michael Schumacher	Franziska van Almsick	Borussia Dortmund
1996	Frank Busemann	Katja Seizinger	men's national football team
1997	Jan Ullrich	Astrid Kumbernuss	T-Mobile-Team - Road cycling
1998	Georg Hackl	Katja Seizinger	1. FC Kaiserslautern
1999	Martin Schmitt	Steffi Graf	Germany ski jumping team
2000	Nils Schumann	Heike Drechsler	Bahnrad-Vierer
2001	Erik Zabel	Hannah Stockbauer	FC Bayern Munich
2002	Sven Hannawald	Franziska van Almsick	men's national football team
2003	Jan Ullrich	Hannah Stockbauer	women's national football team
2004	Michael Schumacher	Birgit Fischer	women's national field hockey team	Wojtek Czyz	Kirsten Bruhn
2005	Ronny Ackermann	Uschi Disl	men's national basketball team	Michael Teuber	Kirsten Bruhn	Sitting volleyball team
2006	Michael Greis	Kati Wilhelm	men's national football team	Gerd Schönfelder	Verena Bentele	Wheelchair basketball team (women)
2007	Fabian Hambüchen	Magdalena Neuner	men's national handball team	Mathias Mester	Natalie Simanowski	Wheelchair basketball team (women)
2008	Matthias Steiner	Britta Steffen	men's national field hockey team	Wolfgang Sacher	Kirsten Bruhn	Wheelchair basketball team (women)
2009	Paul Biedermann	Steffi Nerius	women's national football team	Michael Teuber	Andrea Rothfuss	Wheelchair curling team
2010	Sebastian Vettel	Maria Riesch	men's national football team	Gerd Schönfelder	Verena Bentele	Paracycling team
2011	Dirk Nowitzki	Magdalena Neuner	Borussia Dortmund	Gerd Schönfelder	Anna Schaffelhuber	Wheelchair basketball team (women)
2012	Robert Harting	Magdalena Neuner	Deutschlandachter	Jochen Wollmert	Birgit Kober	Wheelchair basketball team (women)
2013	Robert Harting	Christina Obergföll	FC Bayern Munich	Thomas Schmidberger	Anna Schaffelhuber	Wheelchair basketball team (youth)
2014	Robert Harting	Maria Höfl-Riesch	men's national football team	Markus Rehm	Anna Schaffelhuber	Wheelchair basketball team (women)
2015	Jan Frodeno	Christina Schwanitz	Nordic combined team Germany	Georg Kreiter	Anna Schaffelhuber	Wheelchair basketball team (women)
2016	Fabian Hambüchen	Angelique Kerber	Laura Ludwig and Kira Walkenhorst (beach volleyball)	Niko Kappel	Vanessa Low	Johannes Floors, Markus Rehm, and Léon Schäfer, Tom-Sengua Malutedi (4 × 100 Meters men's Relay)
2017	Johannes Rydzek	Laura Dahlmeier	Laura Ludwig and Kira Walkenhorst (beach volleyball)	Niko Kappel	Anna Schaffelhuber	Johannes Floors, Felix Streng, David Behre, and Markus Rehm (4 × 100 Meters men's Relay)
2018	Patrick Lange	Angelique Kerber	men's national ice hockey team	Martin Fleig	Andrea Eskau	Andrea Eskau, Alexander Ehler, and Steffen Lehmker (Cross-country para skiing mixed team)
2019	Niklas Kaul	Malaika Mihambo	Germany men's national ski jumping team
2020	Leon Draisaitl	Malaika Mihambo	FC Bayern Munich
2021	Alexander Zverev	Malaika Mihambo	Bahnrad-Vierer women	Valentin Baus	Elena Semechin	Wheelchair basketball team (women)
2022	Niklas Kaul	Gina Lückenkemper	Eintracht Frankfurt	Marco Maier	Anna-Lena Forster	mixed para-rowing team
2023	Lukas Dauser	Denise Herrmann-Wick	Germany men's national basketball team	Léon Schäfer	Anna-Lena Forster	Sebastian Marburger, Marco Maier, Linn Kazmaier with guide Florian Baumann, Nico Messinger with guide Robin Wunderle (Cross-country skiing relay team)
2024	Oliver Zeidler	Darja Varfolomeev	Germany women's national 3x3 team	Taliso Engel	Elena Semechin	Germany men's national wheelchair basketball team
2025	Leo Neugebauer	Franziska Preuß	Germany men's national basketball team

== East Germany ==
Year	Male	Female
1953	Gustav-Adolf Schur
1954	Gustav-Adolf Schur
1955	Gustav-Adolf Schur
1956	Gustav-Adolf Schur
1957	Gustav-Adolf Schur
1958	Gustav-Adolf Schur	Karin Beyer
1959	Gustav-Adolf Schur	Gisela Birkemeyer
1960	Gustav-Adolf Schur	Ingrid Krämer
1961	Gustav-Adolf Schur	Ute Starke
1962	Helmut Recknagel	Ingrid Krämer-Gulbin
1963	Klaus Ampler	Ingrid Krämer-Gulbin
1964	Klaus Urbanczyk	Ingrid Krämer-Gulbin
1965	Jürgen May	Hannelore Suppe
1966	Frank Wiegand	Gabriele Seyfert
1967	Roland Matthes	Karin Janz
1968	Roland Matthes	Margitta Gummel
1969	Roland Matthes	Petra Vogt
1970	Roland Matthes	Erika Zuchold
1971	Roland Matthes	Karin Balzer
1972	Wolfgang Nordwig	Karin Janz
1973	Roland Matthes	Kornelia Ender
1974	Hans-Georg Aschenbach	Kornelia Ender
1975	Roland Matthes	Kornelia Ender
1976	Waldemar Cierpinski	Kornelia Ender
1977	Rolf Beilschmidt	Rosemarie Ackermann
1978	Udo Beyer	Marita Koch
1979	Bernd Drogan	Marita Koch
1980	Waldemar Cierpinski	Maxi Gnauck
1981	Lothar Thoms	Ute Geweniger
1982	Bernd Drogan	Marita Koch
1983	Uwe Raab	Marita Koch
1984	Uwe Hohn	Katarina Witt
1985	Jens Weißflog	Marita Koch
1986	Olaf Ludwig	Heike Drechsler
1987	Torsten Voss	Silke Möller
1988	Olaf Ludwig	Kristin Otto
1989	Andreas Wecker	Kristin Otto

== See also ==
- Footballer of the Year (Germany)
- German Volleyball Player of the Year
- German Sports Badge
