= Sonya Klopfer =

American figure skater (1934–2025)

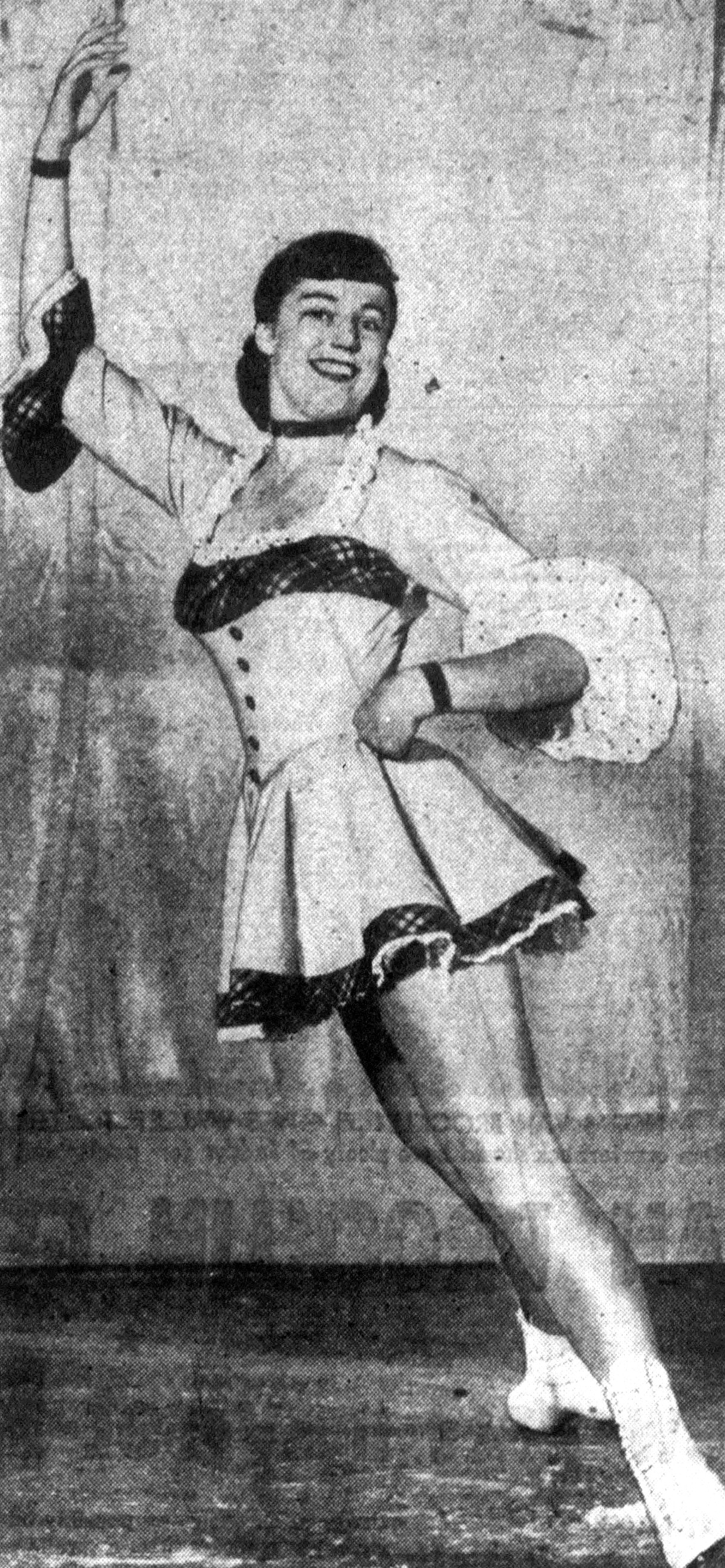
- Klopfer, circa 1953

Personal information
- Full name: Sonya Dunfield
- Born: December 26, 1934 New York City, U.S.
- Died: August 7, 2025 (aged 90)

Figure skating career
- Country: United States
- Retired: 1952
Medal record
Ladies' figure skating
Representing the United States
World Championships
Silver medal – second place	1952 Paris	Ladies' singles
Bronze medal – third place	1951 Milan	Ladies' singles
North American Championships
Gold medal – first place	1951 Calgary	Ladies' singles

Sonya Klopfer (married name: Dunfield, December 26, 1934 – August 7, 2025) was an American competitive figure skater and coach. She was a two-time World medalist (bronze in 1951, silver in 1952) and the 1951 U.S. national champion.

== Background ==
Klopfer was born in New York City on December 26, 1934, and was named after Sonja Henie. She married Canadian figure skater Peter Dunfield, with whom she had two sons.

Klopfer died on August 7, 2025, at the age of 90.

== Career ==
Klopfer won silver on the senior level at the 1950 U.S. Championships. She was then sent to Wembley, England to compete at her first World Championships and finished fifth.

In 1951, Klopfer was awarded the gold medal at the U.S. Championships. Having won at age 15, she was the youngest U.S. senior ladies' champion until Tara Lipinski won in 1997 at age 14. Klopfer obtained the bronze medal in Milan at the 1951 World Championships, standing on the podium with Jeannette Altwegg and Jacqueline du Bief.

In February 1952, Klopfer competed at the Winter Olympics in Oslo, Norway and finished fourth at the event. Her final competition was the 1952 World Championships in Paris, France. She won silver behind du Bief, and then retired from competition.

From the early 1960s, Klopfer coached with her husband in New York City at the Sky Rink. When the rink closed around 1983, they moved to the Gloucester Skating Club in Orleans, Ontario. Her students included Dorothy Hamill, Elizabeth Manley, Scott Smith, and Charlene Wong (from 1986 to 1990). She was inducted into the Skate Canada Hall of Fame in 2001 and into the Professional Skaters Association Coaches Hall of Fame in 2005.

== Results ==
International
Event	1949	1950	1951	1952
Winter Olympics				4th
World Championships		5th	3rd	2nd
North American Championships			1st	
National
U.S. Championships	1st J	2nd	1st	
