= Carlo Fassi =

Italian figure skater

Personal information
- Born: 20 December 1929 Milan, Italy
- Died: 20 March 1997 (aged 67) Lausanne, Switzerland

Figure skating career
- Country: Italy
- Discipline: Men's singles Pair skating
- Partner: Grazia Barcellona
- Retired: 1954

Medal record
Event	Gold medal – first place	Silver medal – second place	Bronze medal – third place
World Championships	0	0	1
European Championships	2	1	2
Italian Championships	19	0	0
Medal list
World Championships
Bronze medal – third place	1953 Davos	Singles
European Championships
Gold medal – first place	1953 Dortmund	Singles
Gold medal – first place	1954 Bolzano	Singles
Silver medal – second place	1952 Vienna	Singles
Bronze medal – third place	1950 Oslo	Singles
Bronze medal – third place	1951 Zurich	Singles
Italian Championships
Gold medal – first place	1942 Milan	Pairs
Gold medal – first place	1943 Milan	Singles
Gold medal – first place	1943 Milan	Pairs
Gold medal – first place	1946 Milan	Singles
Gold medal – first place	1946 Milan	Pairs
Gold medal – first place	1947 Milan	Singles
Gold medal – first place	1947 Milan	Pairs
Gold medal – first place	1948 Milan	Singles
Gold medal – first place	1948 Milan	Pairs
Gold medal – first place	1949 Merano	Singles
Gold medal – first place	1949 Merano	Pairs
Gold medal – first place	1950 Cortina d'Ampezzo	Singles
Gold medal – first place	1950 Cortina d'Ampezzo	Pairs
Gold medal – first place	1951 Asiago	Singles
Gold medal – first place	1951 Asiago	Pairs
Gold medal – first place	1952 Sestriere	Singles
Gold medal – first place	1953 Cortina d'Ampezzo	Singles
Gold medal – first place	1954 Milan	Singles
Gold medal – first place	1954 Milan	Pairs

Carlo Fassi (20 December 1929 – 20 March 1997) was an Italian figure skater and international coach whose students included several World and Olympic champions. His students included Peggy Fleming, Dorothy Hamill, John Curry, Robin Cousins, Jill Trenary, and Nicole Bobek. As a single skater, he was the 1953 World bronze medalist, a two-time European champion (1953, 1954), and a ten-time Italian national champion (1945–54). As a pairs skater, Fassi won the Italian National Championships with his partner, Grazia Barcellona, from 1942 to 1951. In 1961, he and his wife Christa Fassi, who coached with him for 37 years, immigrated to the United States after the Sabena Flight 548 crash; he became a U.S. citizen. He was called legendary and controversial, and his figure skating expertise and ability to speak several languages made him "a force in the behind-the-scenes machinations common in figure skating". Fassi died of a heart attack during the 1997 World Figure Skating Championships.

== Personal life ==
Carlo Fassi was born in Milan on December 20, 1929. He was the son of a builder. He spoke five languages, including English, Italian, German, and French, sometimes at the same time. Fassi married German figure skater Christa von Kuczkowski in 1960. They had three children: Ricardo, Lorenzo, and Monica.

Fassi was called "a dour-looking man with a warm sense of humor" who "pursued skating with a passion". Philip Hersh, a figure skating journalist with the Chicago Tribune, considered Fassi a friend, "more than just someone to whom I turned for information and explanations about his complicated sport". Figure skating reporter Dennis Bird said that he could rely on Fassi for giving him an honest opinion about his students, both positive and negative.

Fassi was a passionate soccer fan; his favorite team was AC Milan. He also had a passion for building models of World War II battleships. After emigrating to the U.S. in 1961, he became an American citizen.

== Competitive career ==
Fassi was a member of the Circolo Pattinatori di Milano. As a pairs skater with Grazia Barcellona, he came in thirteenth place at the 1948 Winter Olympics in St. Moritz, Switzerland, and came in ninth place at the 1949 European Championships. He won the Italian National Championships with Barcellona from 1942 to 1951. Dennis Bird reported many years later that he had written "rather condescendingly" about Fassi after seeing him compete for the first time at the 1949 World Championships, "Carlo Fassi of Italy was inclined to toe-poke (a common fault in compulsory figure skating) but is generally conceded to have improved since last year's Olympics". He came in eighth place. He came in sixth place at the 1951 and 1952 World Championships and won a bronze medal at the 1953 World Championships.

Fassi came in fourth place at the 1949 European Championships, won bronze medals at the European Championships in 1950 and 1951, a silver medal at the European Championships in 1952, and gold medals at the European Championships in 1953 and 1954. He competed at two Olympics, coming in fifteenth place in 1948 and in sixth place in 1952, and was the Italian men's national champion between 1943 and 1954. Fassi tied the record for winning the most Italian nationals titles with Alberto Bonacossa.

== Coaching career ==
Declining to join the Ice Capades, Fassi took up coaching after the end of his competitive career. Hersh called him "one of the most renowned singles coaches in figure skating history". According to figure skating historian James R. Hines, Fassi's importance was not "found in his competitive record but rather in his role as one of the most respected and successful coaches" in figure skating at the time. From 1956 to 1961, he coached at the Olympic Stadium in Cortina d'Ampezzo, Italy, and for four years served as the trainer for the Italian World team. One of his first students was Christa Kuczkowski, who became the Italian national champion a year after they married and worked with him as a teacher and coach.

Following the 1961 plane crash that killed the entire U.S. figure skating team and many of the top American coaches, Fassi and Kuczkowski moved to the United States, where they established themselves as a successful coaching team. Carlo Fassi became a U.S. citizen. The Fassis "were a splendid partnership" and worked together for 37 years. Dennis Bird stated, "Each had qualities that complemented the other, to the benefit of their pupils". In 1961, the Fassis were based first at the Broadmoor Arena in Colorado Springs, Colorado, where he was appointed chief instructor, then at the Colorado Ice Arena in suburban Denver, before returning to the Broadmoor in the early 1980s. Fassi later spent three years in Italy in the early 1990s to bolster the Italian team, but returned to the United States in 1993 to coach at the Ice Castle rink in Lake Arrowhead, California. In 1980, he wrote the book, Figure Skating with Carlo Fassi.

Skaters from all over the world came to train with the Fassis. Their students included Peggy Fleming, Dorothy Hamill, John Curry and Robin Cousins from Great Britain, and Jill Trenary. Figure skating writer and journalist Christine Brennan said that becoming Fossi's student was "like going to finishing school". Fleming, whom Fassi later called his most talented student and his first major skating student, began working with Fassi "as an unpolished Californian teenager" in 1965 in Colorado Springs. She said that she went to him to improve her compulsory figures, "but the lessons he taught me changed my life". Cousins said that he would not have won the Olympic gold medal in 1980 without Fassi's coaching. Curry said about him, "Mr Fassi is the best trainer in the world". He coached Nicole Bobek, who was Fassi's student at the time of his death and saw him as a father figure. The first time Fassi coached Bobek was in 1990, when she was a junior skater, and again in 1996, after working with five other coaches, to prepare for the 1997 season and the 1998 Olympics. According to Brennan, Fassi instilled confidence in Bobek and loved and understood her. Fassi was estranged from Hamill for 20 years before his death in 1997 due to a contract dispute. Brennan called Fassi "an accomplished Italian skater and coach" and one of fellow coach Frank Carroll's "rivals".

Fassi's students:

- Nicole Bobek: Bronze medal, 1997 U.S. Championships
- Robin Cousins: Gold medal, 1980 European Championships; gold medal, 1980 Olympics
- John Curry: Bronze medal, 1975 World Championships; gold medal, 1975 European Championships, 1975 and 1976 British Championships, 1976 European Championships, 1976 World Championships, 1976 Olympics
- Peggy Fleming: three world titles and gold medal at the 1968 Olympics.
- Cornel Gheorghe: bronze medal, 1992 Romanian Championships; gold medal, 1991, 1993-1997.
- Dorothy Hamill: Bronze medal, 1974 Worlds Championships, 1975 Worlds Championships; gold medal, 1976 World Championships; 1976 Olympics
- Jill Trenary: Gold medal, 1990 U.S. Championships, 1990 World Championships

== Legacy and death ==
Fassi opposed the elimination of compulsory figures in 1990, worrying that it would "turn women’s skating into gymnastics on ice". He was concerned that an emphasis on jumps would shorten careers due to more injuries. He also opposed raising the age limit for senior-level skaters, arguing that junior skaters would eventually be better than older, senior skaters. His solution would have been to limit the number of bigger jumps women executed during a free skating program.

Hersh called Fassi both legendary and controversial, and wrote that his ability to speak several languages made him "a force in the behind-the-scenes machinations common in figure skating". Hersh also said that Fassi "was adept at ensuring that his skaters received the marks they deserved from judges, especially in the years when compulsory figures counted for more than half a skater’s score". Brennan said that his skating expertise and his language skills helped him excel in making backroom deals with judges, although he denied that any of his deals were shady. Brennan also suggested that the removal of compulsory figures deprived him and other coaches "the chance to maneuver behind the scenes".

According to Hersh, Fassi "anger[ed] many in the U.S. figure skating establishment", especially after allegations that Fassi had made a deal with communist block judges during the 1980 Olympics that favored East German Anett Poetzch over Linda Fratianne of the U.S., who was coached by Frank Carroll. The alleged deal included awarding the gold medal to British male skater Robin Cousins, who was coached by Fassi, over Jan Hoffman of East Germany, who came in second place. Fratianne, who was devastated by her loss for decades, came in second place. There was never any evidence of deal-making, but Carroll was certain that it had happened, although Fassi denied it and the two barely spoke for many years, until they reconciled after Fassi came to coach at Lake Arrowhead, where Carroll was director.

Fassi died of a heart attack at the 1997 World Championships in Lausanne, which he was attending as the coach of Nicole Bobek and Cornel Gheorghe. He had diabetes, but no history of heart problems. He had complained of indigestion and dizziness and died in a hospital in Lausanne with his wife and son at his side. Bobek, who continued to compete at the World Championships, told reporters that one of Fassi's last requests was that Crista Fassi continue to coach her for the rest of the competition. Cousins called Fassi's death at Worlds "uncanny". The news about Fassi's death "traveled like wildfire" at the competition; Brennan reported, "Coaches and judges wept and embraced in the same open-air gathering place that Fassi had walked through that morning on his way to the skaters' lounge". A moment of silence was observed in his honor before the men's free skate at Worlds.

Fassi was inducted into the World Figure Skating Hall of Fame in 1997, the Coaches Hall of Fame by the Professional Skaters Association in 2002, and the U.S. Figure Skating Hall of Fame in 2008.

== Results ==
=== Men's singles ===
Competition placements at senior level
Season	1942–43	1945–46	1946–47	1947–48	1948–49	1949–50	1950–51	1951–52	1952–53	1953–54
Winter Olympics				15th				6th		
World Championships					8th		6th	6th	3rd	
European Championships					4th	3rd	3rd	2nd	1st	1st
Italian Championships	1st	1st	1st	1st	1st	1st	1st	1st	1st	1st

=== Pair skating with Grazia Barcellona ===
Competition placements at senior level
Season	1941–42	1942–43	1945–46	1946–47	1947–48	1948–49	1949–50	1950–51	1953–54
Winter Olympics					13th				
European Championships						9th			
Italian Championships	1st	1st	1st	1st	1st	1st	1st	1st	1st

== Works cited ==
- Brennan, Christine (1998). Edge of Glory: The Inside Story of the Quest for Figure Skating's Olympic Gold Medals. New York: Scribner. ISBN 0-684-84128-2.
- Hines, James R. (2011). Historical Dictionary of Figure Skating. Lanham, Maryland: Scarecrow Press. ISBN 978-0-8108-6859-5.
