= Scala Eisrevue =

Scala-Eis-Revue was an ice show which traveled around Europe from 1951 until 1968 and after that with Charlie Buchmann as manager until 1970.

It was owned by Hanns Thelen (who died in 1968) and his son Horst Thelen, who was the technical director of the show. The office and the quarters where in Solingen, Germany. The technical brains belonged Helmut Eckart who in 1956 left the show to join "Holiday on Ice". Heinz Klapproth was the administration manager for "Scala" for many years with Georges Sylvestre, Paul Felske and Heinz Koschka as assistance. Scala Eis-Revue also travelled behind the Iron Curtain, spending several months in the then German Democratic Republic and East Berlin. The show also travelled outside of Europe to South America.

The show included many stars such as Ilse & Dr. Erik Pausin, Sigrid Knaake and Günther Koch, Kathrin Saller and Fred Emanuel, Dr. Eva Pawlik and Rudi Seeliger, Eva and Horst Faber, Majory Chase, Raf Caldicott and as Guests Marika Kilius & Hans-Jürgen Bäumler, Inge von der Heiden, Alain Gilletti, Jack Lee, Heinz Kröll Larry Kemble, Harry Reddy, Hans Lugmaier, Lucien & Paul Mayer, Paul & Michael Carrington, Jean Rathbone, Jaqueline and Raymonde Du Bief, and many others.

The show also travelled and performed for several years in France with a mobile ice-rink 12 X 18 metre (39 x 59 feet) and a tent for nearly 3,000 people. Also for six years, a third show travelled in France with "Circus Pinder" before going for several months to South America.

On its own the show went under the name of "Feerie de la Glace" to France from 1952 until 1968 nearly 6 month every year. There George Sylvestre was the tour organizer and Alan Goodman as technical manager from 1963.

From 1952 until 1964 the show also travelled and performed in Italy with a second show and material. In 1954 the materials where shipped to Istanbul in Turkey for five months.

After the return the show went back to France, Germany, the Netherlands, Belgium and Luxembourg.
