= Paul Falk (figure skater) =

German figure skater (1921–2017)

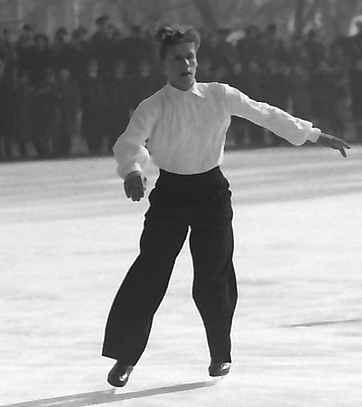

Personal information
- Born: 21 December 1921 Dortmund, Germany
- Died: 20 May 2017 (aged 95) Queidersbach, Germany

Figure skating career
- Country: West Germany
- Retired: 1952
Medal record
Representing West Germany
Pairs' Figure skating
Olympic Games
Gold medal – first place	1952 Oslo	Pairs
World Championships
Gold medal – first place	1951 Milan	Pairs
Gold medal – first place	1952 Paris	Pairs
European Championships
Gold medal – first place	1951 Zürich	Pairs
Gold medal – first place	1952 Vienna	Pairs

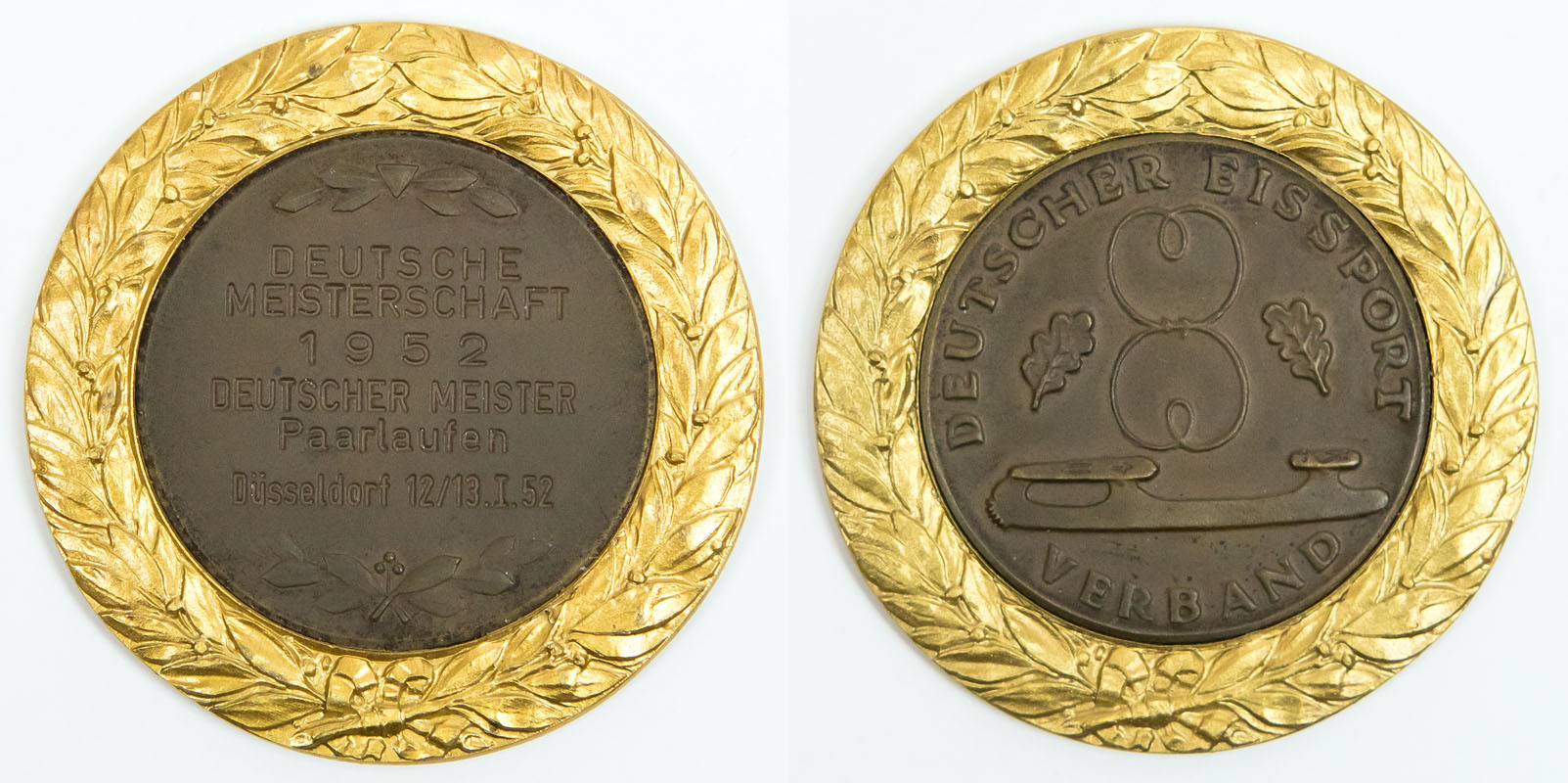
Gold medal from the 1952 German Figure Skating Championships, won by Ria Baran and Paul Falk in pair skating

Paul Falk (German pronunciation: [paʊ̯l ˈfalk]; 21 December 1921 – 20 May 2017) was a German pair skater. Born in Dortmund, Germany, he skated with Ria Baran and became two-time World champion and 1952 Olympic champion. Baran and Falk married during their active international figure skating.

The pair skated for the club Düsseldorfer EG and had no coach. They came in fourth place at the German National Championships in 1940. Their career was curtailed by World War II; they won Nationals when they were reinstated in 1947. Until 1951, when they won the European Championships, Baran and Falk were not able to participate in international competitions because Germany was excluded from the international sport after the war. Also in 1951, they won the World Championships over Americans Karol Kennedy and Peter Kennedy. In 1952, they won their second European and World titles, as well as a gold medal at the Olympics.

They were the first couple who performed side by side double jumps and they also invented the Lasso-Lift. Baran and Falk were never defeated in amateur competition. They were also World pair champions in roller skating.

In 1951 Falk was voted the male athlete of the year in Germany. After winning the Olympics in 1952 they turned professional and worked for Holiday on Ice. Falk's profession outside athletics was as a precision mechanic; he was also "a prominent coach in Germany". In 1993 they were inducted into the World Figure Skating Hall of Fame. He died 8 1/2 months before Aliona Savchenko and Bruno Massot won the gold medal for pairs skating at the 2018 Winter Olympics.

== Results ==
=== Pair skating with Ria Baran ===
Event	1942	1943	1947	1948	1949	1950	1951	1952
Winter Olympic Games								1st
World Championships							1st	1st
European Championships							1st	1st
German Championships	2nd	3rd	1st	1st	1st	1st	1st	1st

Awards
Preceded by (Germany) Herbert Klein	German Sportsman of the Year; 1951	Succeeded by (Germany) Karl Kling
