= Erika Kraft =

German figure skater (1931–2003)

Personal information
- Full name: Erika Franziska Kraft
- Born: 18 November 1931 Munich, Germany
- Died: 4 March 2003 (aged 71) Chapel Hill, North Carolina, United States

Figure skating career
- Country: West Germany
- Skating club: SC Riessersee
- Retired: c. 1952

Erika Kraft (18 November 1931 – 4 March 2003) was a German former figure skater who represented West Germany. She was the 1952 national champion and placed tenth at the 1952 Winter Olympics in Oslo, Norway. She finished 14th at the 1951 World Championships in Milan, Italy, and fourth at the 1952 European Championships in Vienna, Austria. Kraft belonged to SC Riessersee in Garmisch-Partenkirchen.

== Competitive highlights ==
International
Event	1950	1951	1952
Winter Olympics			10th
World Championships		14th	
European Championships			4th
National
West German Championships	2nd	2nd	1st
