= Leena Pietilä =

Finnish figure skater

Personal information
- Full name: Irja Ester Helena Pietilä
- Other names: Leena Vainio
- Born: 29 March 1925 Rauma, Finland
- Died: 20 May 2014 (aged 89) Mikkeli, Finland
- Height: 1.65 m (5 ft 5 in)

Figure skating career
- Country: Finland
- Skating club: Helsingfors Skridskoklubb
- Retired: c. 1953

Irja Ester Helena "Leena" Pietilä, married surname: Vainio (born 29 March 1925 – 20 May 2014) was a Finnish figure skater who competed both in women's singles and pairs. She represented Finland at the 1952 Winter Olympics. At the domestic level, she was a seven-time Finnish national champion in women's singles and a five-time national champion in pair skating with two partners.

== Early life ==
On 29 March 1925, Pietilä was born in Rauma, Finland. She was discovered by Marcus Nikkanen during a trip to teach skaters in smaller towns.

== Career ==
Pietilä was a figure skater for Helsingfors Skridskoklubb in Helsinki. She was a seven-time Finnish national champion from 1946 to 1953, with her only loss being in 1948 to Kirsti Linna. She also competed domestically in pair skating; she won the national championships in 1947 with Biger Nyman and from 1951 to 1953 and again in 1955 with Lars Björkman.

In 1946, she competed at the Nordic Championships and won the bronze medal. The next year, she placed 16th at the 1947 World Championships in Stockholm, Sweden, which was her only appearance at the World Championships.

In 1950, she placed 13th at the European Championships in Oslo, Norway, and she won the silver medal at the 1950 Nordic Championships. The next year, she was again 13th at the 1951 European Championships in Zürich, Switzerland. In March 1951, she was reported to be training in London under coach Arnold Gerschwiler. In November, she entered the Richmond Trophy, where she placed 9th.

She entered in 1952 European Championships in February but withdrew. Later in February, Pietilä represented Finland at the 1952 Winter Olympics in Oslo, Norway, and finished 20th.

After retiring from competition, Pietilä became an international figure skating judge and coach and joined the board of directors for the Finnish Figure Skating Association.

== Competitive highlights ==
International
Event	1946	1947	1948	1949	1950	1951	1952	1953
Winter Olympics							20th	
World Champ.		16th						
European Champ.					13th	13th	WD	
Nordics	3rd	1st		3rd	2nd	1st		2nd
National
Finnish Champ.	1st	1st		1st	1st	1st	1st	1st
WD = Withdrew

== Personal life ==
Pietilä married and changed her surname to Vainio. On 20 May, 2014, she died in Mikkeli, Finland at the age of 89.

== See also ==
- Finnish Figure Skating Championships
