= Silvia Grandjean =

Swiss pairs skater

Personal information
- Born: 27 August 1934 (age 91)

Figure skating career
- Country: Switzerland
Medal record
Representing Switzerland
Pairs' Figure skating
World Championships
Silver medal – second place	1954 Oslo	Pairs
European Championships
Gold medal – first place	1954 Bolzano	Pairs

Silvia Grandjean (born 27 August 1934) is a Swiss pairs skater. She had the following placements at major international championships in the early 1950s: 1951 World Championships (7th place); 1952 World Championships (6th place); 1953 World Championships (4th place); 1954 World Championships (World Runner-up); 1951 European Championships (4th place); 1952 European Championships (4th place); 1954 European Championships (European champion).

== Results ==
(pairs with Michel Grandjean)

Event	1951	1952	1953	1954
Winter Olympic Games		7th		
World Championships	7th	6th	4th	2nd
European Championships	4th	4th		1st
Swiss Championships		1st	1st	1st
