= Ria Baran =

German figure skater (1922–1986)

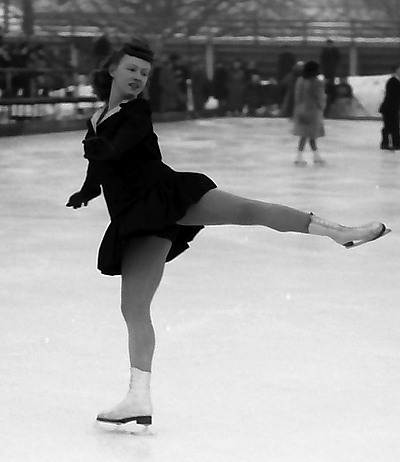
- Baran in 1943

Personal information
- Born: 2 November 1922 Dortmund, Germany
- Died: 12 November 1986 (aged 64) Düsseldorf, West Germany

Figure skating career
- Country: West Germany
- Retired: 1952
Medal record
Representing West Germany
Pairs' Figure skating
Olympic Games
Gold medal – first place	1952 Oslo	Pairs
World Championships
Gold medal – first place	1951 Milan	Pairs
Gold medal – first place	1952 Paris	Pairs
European Championships
Gold medal – first place	1951 Zürich	Pairs
Gold medal – first place	1952 Vienna	Pairs

Ria Baran (German pronunciation: [ˈʁiːa baˈʁaːn]; 2 November 1922 in Dortmund, Germany – 12 November 1986) was a German pair skater. She skated together with Paul Falk and twice became World champion and in 1952 Olympic champion. She was one of the oldest female figure skating Olympic champions.

Ria Baran married Paul Falk during her active international figure skating. Therefore she is sometime listed as Ria Baran-Falk or Ria Falk. According to figure skating historian James R. Hines, they were known in the skating world as "the Falks". They were also world pair championships in roller skating.

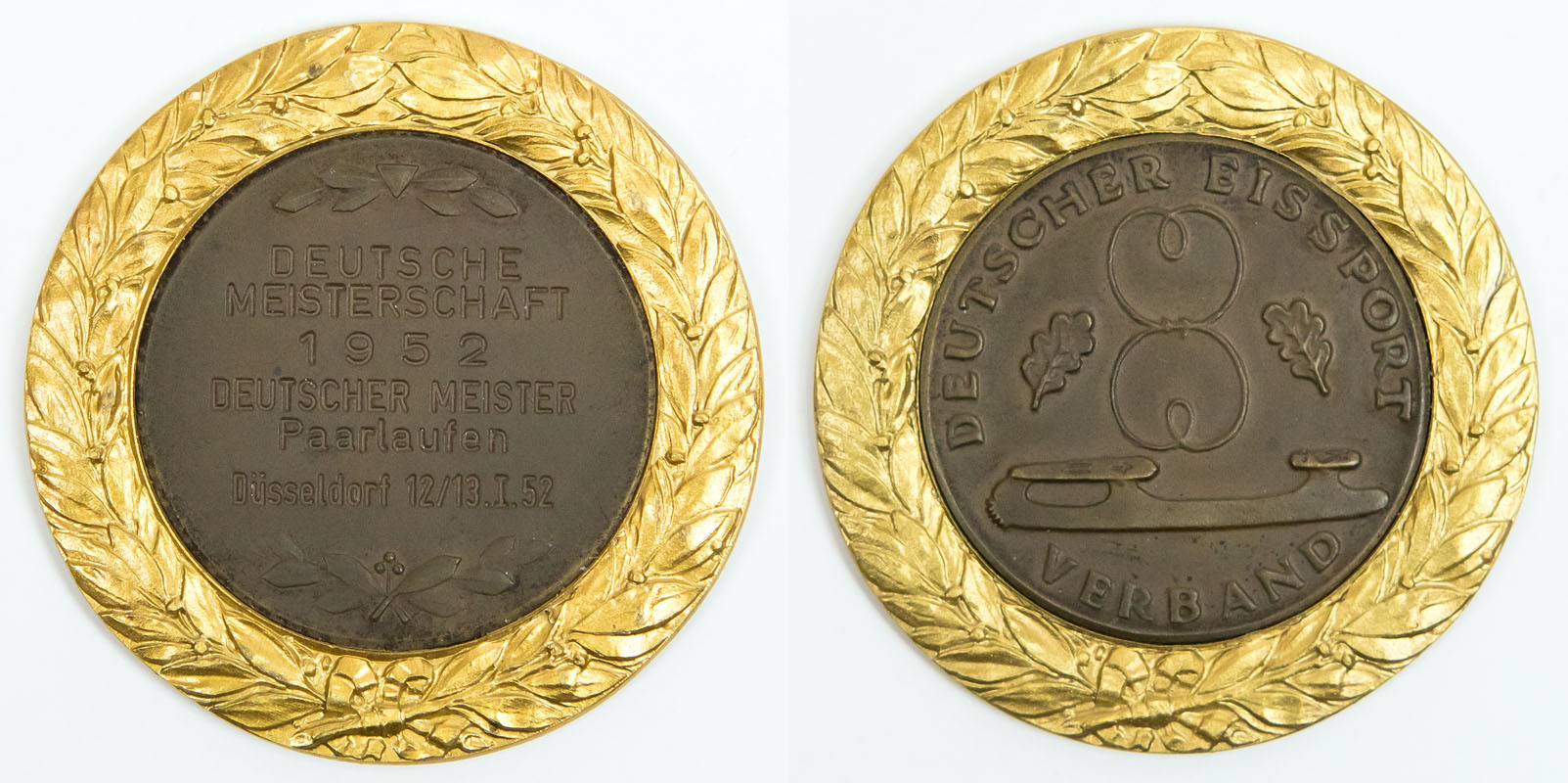
Gold medal from the 1952 German Figure Skating Championships, won by Ria Baran and Paul Falk in pair skating

The pair skated for the club Düsseldorfer EG and had no coach. They came in fourth place at the German National Championships in 1940. Their career was curtailed by World War II; they won Nationals when they were reinstated in 1947. Until 1951, when they won the European Championships, Baran and Falk were not able to participate in international competitions because Germany was excluded from the international sport after the war. Also in 1951, they won the World Championships over Americans Karol Kennedy and Peter Kennedy. In 1952, they won their second European and World titles, as well as a gold medal at the Olympics.

They were the first couple which performed side by side double jumps and they also invented the Lasso-Lift.

Baran and Falk were never defeated in amateur competition.

Between 1950 and 1952 Ria Baran was voted 3 times running as the female athlete of the year in Germany.

After winning the Olympics in 1952 they turned pro and worked for Holiday on Ice.

They were elected to the World Figure Skating Hall of Fame in 1993.

Baran later worked as a secretary.

== Results ==
(pairs with Paul Falk)

Event	1947	1948	1949	1950	1951	1952
Winter Olympic Games						1st
World Championships					1st	1st
European Championships					1st	1st
German Championships	1st	1st	1st	1st	1st	1st

Awards
Preceded by (Germany) Lena Stumpf	German Sportswoman of the Year; 1950 – 1952	Succeeded by (Germany) Christa Seliger
