= Gundi Busch =

German figure skater (1935–2014)

Personal information
- Full name: Gundula Busch
- Born: 29 April 1935 Milan, Italy
- Died: 31 January 2014 (aged 78) Stockholm, Sweden

Figure skating career
- Country: West Germany
- Coach: Thea Frenssen
- Skating club: SC Rießersee
- Retired: 1954
Medal record
Representing West Germany
Figure skating: Ladies' singles
World Championships
Gold medal – first place	1954 Oslo	Ladies' singles
Silver medal – second place	1953 Davos	Ladies' singles
European Championships
Gold medal – first place	1954 Bolzano	Ladies' singles
Silver medal – second place	1953 Dortmund	Ladies' singles

Gundula "Gundi" Busch (29 April 1935 – 31 January 2014) was a German figure skater. She was the 1954 World champion, the 1954 European champion, and a two-time West German national champion.

== Life and career ==
=== Early life ===
Gundula Busch was born on 29 April 1935 in Milan, Italy. She was a daughter of a German businessman. The family moved to Harlem, Netherlands in 1944, and later to Garmisch-Partenkirchen, Bavaria, Germany.

=== Career ===
Busch began skating at age four and a half years. She also took ballet classes in Garmisch-Partenkirchen and visited London in 1950 to learn from elite skaters.

Busch was coached by Thea Frenssen. Her skating club was SC Rießersee. She began representing West Germany at major international events after becoming the national bronze medalist in January 1951. Later in 1951, she came in sixth place at the European Championships and 10th place at the World Championships. In 1952, she was selected to compete at the Winter Olympics in Oslo, Norway; she placed 10th in compulsory figures, sixth in free skating, and eighth overall.

Busch took silver at the 1953 European Championships in Dortmund, finishing second to Valda Osborn of the United Kingdom. At the 1953 World Championships in Davos, she won silver behind Tenley Albright of the United States.

Busch won gold at the 1954 European Championships in Bolzano, ahead of British skaters Erica Batchelor and Yvonne Sugden. She then outscored Albright and Batchelor for the gold medal at the 1954 World Championships in Oslo. She was the first ladies' single skater representing Germany to become a world champion.

Deciding to end her amateur skating career, Busch accepted an offer from the Hollywood Ice Revue. She performed as a professional skater at New York's Madison Square Garden in 1955.

=== Later years ===
Busch married a Swedish professional ice hockey player, Lill-Lulle Johansson, in 1955. They moved with their son, Peter Lulle Johansson, to Stockholm, Sweden. Busch worked as a figure skating coach in Sweden for many years before retiring in 1997.

Busch died after a prolonged illness at Stockholm's Saint Göran Hospital on 31 January 2014.

== Results ==
International
Event	1951	1952	1953	1954
Winter Olympics		8th		
World Championships	10th	6th	2nd	1st
European Championships	6th	7th	2nd	1st
National
German Championships	3rd	2nd	1st	1st
