= Gábor Vida (figure skater) =

Hungarian figure skater (1929–2022)

Personal information
- Nationality: Hungarian
- Born: 4 October 1929 Budapest, Hungary
- Died: 19 February 2022 (aged 92)

Sport
- Sport: Figure skating

Gábor Vida (4 October 1929 – 19 February 2022) was a Hungarian figure skater. He competed in the pairs event at the 1952 Winter Olympics.
