= Eliane Steinemann =

Swiss figure skater

Figure skating career
- Country: Switzerland
Medal record
Representing Switzerland
Figure skating: Pairs
European Championships
Silver medal – second place	1950 Oslo	Pairs
Silver medal – second place	1951 Zurich	Pairs

Eliane Steinemann is a Swiss figure skater who competed in pair skating.

With partner André Calame, she won silver at the 1950 and 1951 European Figure Skating Championships.

== Competitive highlights ==
With André Calame

Event	1950	1951
European Championships	2nd	2nd
