= John Nicks =

British figure skater (1929–2026)

Personal information
- Full name: John Allen Wisden Nicks
- Born: 22 April 1929 Brighton, England
- Died: 3 November 2026 (aged 97) Costa Mesa, California, U.S.

Figure skating career
- Country: Great Britain
- Retired: 1953
Medal record
Representing Great Britain
Pairs' Figure skating
World Championships
Gold medal – first place	1953 Davos	Pairs
Bronze medal – third place	1951 Milan	Pairs
Bronze medal – third place	1952 Paris	Pairs
Silver medal – second place	1950 London	Pairs
European Championships
Gold medal – first place	1953 Dortmund	Pairs
Silver medal – second place	1952 Vienna	Pairs
Bronze medal – third place	1950 Oslo	Pairs
Bronze medal – third place	1951 Zürich	Pairs

John Allen Wisden Nicks (22 April 1929 – 3 November 2026) was a British figure skating coach and pair skater. With his sister, Jennifer Nicks, he was the 1953 World champion. As a coach, his skating pupils have included Peggy Fleming, pairs team Tai Babilonia and Randy Gardner, Kristi Yamaguchi, Paul Wylie, Sasha Cohen, Rory Flack and Ashley Wagner.

== Background ==
John Nicks, the son of a sporting goods store owner, grew up in Brighton, England. He was the brother of Jennifer Nicks. He moved to the United States in the 1960s with his wife Denise, son Christopher and daughter Carolyn and was briefly an undocumented immigrant but received his green card a few weeks later. He later married American former ice dancer Yvonne Littlefield. Nicks became a U.S. citizen around 2008.

Nicks died at his home in Costa Mesa, California, on 3 November 2026, aged 97.

== Career ==
Nicks began skating at age 10 or 11 after his father – who knew nothing about skating but wanted to sell skating equipment – put him in skates in order to learn more about them. John and Jennifer competed initially as singles skaters but agreed to train together in pair skating upon the request of the British association, which promised to support them. They made their first Olympic appearance at the 1948 Winter Olympics, where they finished 8th. Recalling the competition in a January 2013 interview, John said, "it was snowing so much they had to stop the skating after every three skaters to clear the snow." He was impressed by the American skaters at the event, in particular Dick Button – this would later influence his decision to come to the United States.

The Nicks siblings won the first of their four World medals, silver, at the 1950 World Championships. They won World bronze the next two seasons and competed at their second Olympics in 1952, where they finished 4th. The pair won gold at the 1953 World Championships in Davos, Switzerland. John said, "We were skating outdoors back then, and the temperature was, like, 28 degrees during a practice. It was so cold that I remember when I was taking off my boots that my laces were frozen." The siblings retired from competition after the event.

John Nicks moved to South Africa, where he skated in shows and began coaching, but moved back to England in 1960 and eventually on to Canada, coaching in Trail, British Columbia. Following the February 1961 crash of Sabena Flight 548, which killed the entire U.S. figure skating team, he received four offers of a coaching job in the United States and agreed to coach at a rink in Paramount, California owned by Frank Zamboni. He first appeared at the U.S. Championships as a coach in 1965.

As of 2012, Nicks coached in Aliso Viejo, California. He coached over 1,200 skaters during his career. In April 2013, he said he would no longer travel but would still coach Ashley Wagner at the Aliso Viejo Ice Palace. Nicks was inducted into the World Figure Skating Hall of Fame in 2000. He appeared as a judge on the 2006 FOX television program Skating with Celebrities.

P.S.A. Hall of Fame, I.S.I.A. Hall of Fame, U.S.F.S. Hall of Fame, I.S.U. World Hall of Fame, Skaters have won 29 National Championships, Coached for U.S. in 31 World Championships, Coached for U.S. in 10 Winter Olympics

His students included:

- Peggy Fleming
- Angela Nikodinov
- Jo Jo Starbuck / Kenneth Shelley
- Tai Babilonia / Randy Gardner
- Tiffany Chin
- Dana Graham / Paul Wylie
- Christopher Bowman
- Natasha Kuchiki
- Jenni Meno / Todd Sand
- Kristi Yamaguchi / Rudy Galindo
- Naomi Nari Nam
- Sasha Cohen
- Ashley Wagner (from June 2011 on)
- Michael Christian Martinez
- Michael Novales
- Rory Flack

== Competitive highlights with Nicks ==
International
Event	46–47	47–48	48–49	49–50	50–51	51–52	52–53
Olympic		8th				4th	
Worlds		8th	6th	2nd	3rd	3rd	1st
Europeans	6th	5th	6th	3rd	3rd	2nd	1st
National
British Champ.		1st	1st	1st	1st	1st	1st

== John Nicks Pairs Challenge ==
The John Nicks Pairs Challenge is an annual international pair skating competition hosted by U.S. Figure Skating. It is held in September in New York City, New York. Medals are awarded on the senior and junior levels. Named in honor of British figure skating coach and pair skater John Nicks, the event was first held in 2021.
