= Jennifer Nicks =

British figure skater (1932–1980)

Personal information
- Born: 13 April 1932
- Died: 21 August 1980 (aged 48)

Figure skating career
- Country: Great Britain
- Retired: 1953
Medal record
Representing Great Britain
Pairs' Figure skating
World Championships
Gold medal – first place	1953 Davos	Pairs
Bronze medal – third place	1951 Milan	Pairs
Bronze medal – third place	1952 Paris	Pairs
Silver medal – second place	1950 London	Pairs
European Championships
Gold medal – first place	1953 Davos	Pairs
Silver medal – second place	1952 Vienna	Pairs
Bronze medal – third place	1950 Oslo	Pairs
Bronze medal – third place	1951 Zürich	Pairs

Jennifer Mary Nicks (13 April 1932 – 21 August 1980) was a British pair skater. She competed with brother John Nicks. In 1953, the two won Great Britain's only World and European titles in pair skating, after having placed fourth at the 1952 Winter Olympics.

== Personal life ==
Jennifer Nicks, the daughter of a sporting goods store owner, grew up in Brighton, England. She was the sister of John Nicks. She died in 1980 as the result of a heart attack.

== Career ==
Jennifer Nicks began skating after her father – who knew nothing about skating but wanted to sell skating equipment – put her and her brother in skates in order to learn more about them.

Jennifer and John Nicks competed initially as singles skaters but agreed to train together in pair skating upon the request of the British association, which promised to support them. They made their first Olympic appearance at the 1948 Winter Olympics, where they finished 8th. The pair won the first of their four World medals, silver, at the 1950 World Championships. They won World bronze the next two seasons and competed at their second Olympics in 1952, where they finished 4th. The pair won gold at the 1953 World Championships in Davos, Switzerland. They retired from competition after the event.

== Competitive highlights ==
(with John Nicks)

Event	1947	1948	1949	1950	1951	1952	1953
Winter Olympic Games		8th				4th	
World Championships		8th	6th	2nd	3rd	3rd	1st
European Championships	6th	5th	6th	3rd	3rd	2nd	1st
British Championships		1st	1st	1st	1st	1st	1st
