= Éva Szöllösy =

Hungarian figure skater

Éva Szöllősi
Personal information
- Nationality: Hungarian
- Born: 10 January 1935 (age 90); Târnăveni, Romania

Sport
- Sport: Figure skating

Éva Szöllősi (born 10 January 1935) is a Hungarian figure skater. She competed in the pairs event at the 1952 Winter Olympics.
