= Jeannette Altwegg =

British figure skater (1930–2021)

Jeannette Altwegg CBE
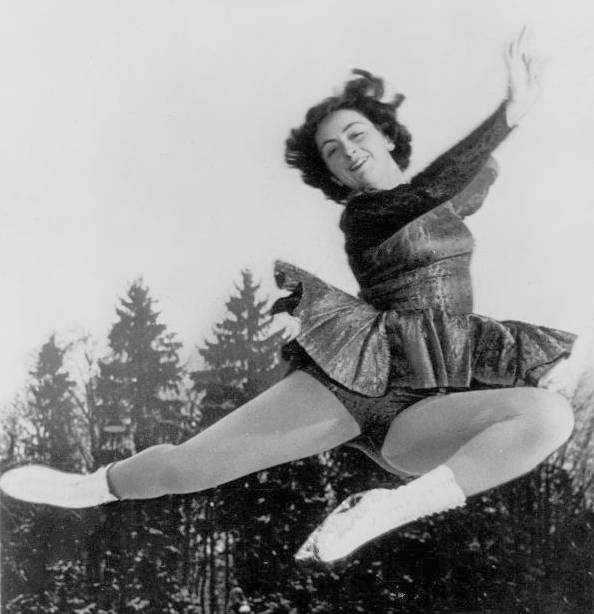
- Altwegg in 1951

Personal information
- Born: Jeannette Eleanor Altwegg; 8 September 1930 Bombay, British India
- Died: 18 June 2021 (aged 90)

Figure skating career
- Country: Great Britain
- Skating club: Queens Ice Dance Club, London
- Retired: 1952
Medal record
Representing Great Britain
Figure skating: Ladies' singles
Olympic Games
Gold medal – first place	1952 Oslo	Ladies' singles
Bronze medal – third place	1948 St. Moritz	Ladies' singles
World Championships
Gold medal – first place	1951 Milan	Singles
Silver medal – second place	1950 London	Singles
Bronze medal – third place	1949 Paris	Singles
European Championships
Gold medal – first place	1952 Vienna	Singles
Gold medal – first place	1951 Zürich	Singles
Silver medal – second place	1950 Oslo	Singles
Bronze medal – third place	1949 Milan	Singles

Jeannette Eleanor Wirz CBE (née Altwegg; 8 September 1930 – 18 June 2021) was a British figure skater who competed in ladies' singles. She was the 1952 Olympic champion, the 1948 Olympic bronze medalist, the 1951 World champion, and a double (1951 & 1952) European champion.

== Life and career ==
=== Early life ===
Altwegg was born on 8 September 1930 in Bombay, India. She was raised in Liverpool, the daughter of a Scottish mother and Swiss father. She was a competitive tennis player, reaching the junior finals at Wimbledon in 1947 before giving up the sport to focus on skating.

=== Skating career ===
Altwegg was coached by Jacques Gerschwiler and was known for her strong compulsory figures. She won four British Figure Skating Championships. She won bronze at the 1948 Winter Olympics in St. Moritz, Switzerland, finishing third behind Barbara Ann Scott of Canada and Eva Pawlik of Austria. In 1951, she stood atop the podium at the European Championships in Zurich and at the World Championships in Milan.

Altwegg successfully defended her continental title at the 1952 European Championships in Vienna. She was awarded gold at the 1952 Winter Olympics in Oslo, Norway, ahead of Tenley Albright of the United States and Jacqueline du Bief of France. She became the first British woman to win an individual gold medal at a Winter Olympics. Her achievement was not matched until the 2010 Winter Olympics in Vancouver when Amy Williams won gold in skeleton. Altwegg was the first British woman to have won two individual medals (gold and bronze) at the Winter Olympics.

After her Olympic victory, Altwegg bypassed a lucrative professional career due to a knee injury. In the 1953 Coronation Honours, she was appointed, at the recommendation of Winston Churchill, Commander of the Order of the British Empire (CBE) for services to amateur skating. She was inducted into the World Figure Skating Hall of Fame in 1993.

=== Later life ===
After retiring from skating, Altwegg worked at Pestalozzi Children's Village in Switzerland. She married Marc Wirz, the brother of Swiss skater Susi Wirz. They had four children before divorcing in 1973. Their daughter Christina Wirz was a member of Switzerland's 1983 World champion curling team. In June 2021, the death of Altwegg was announced in Switzerland.

== Results ==
International
Event	1947	1948	1949	1950	1951	1952
Winter Olympics		3rd				1st
World Championships	5th	4th	3rd	2nd	1st	
European Championships	4th	5th	3rd	2nd	1st	1st
National
British Championships	3rd	1st	1st	1st	1st	
