= 1952 Currie Cup =

Domestic rugby union competition

- Countries: South Africa
- Champions: Transvaal (4th title)
- Runners-up: Boland

The 1952 Currie Cup was the 24th edition of the Currie Cup, the premier domestic rugby union competition in South Africa.

The tournament was won by Transvaal for the fourth time; they beat Boland 11–9 in the final in Wellington.

== See also ==
- Currie Cup
