= Jean Westwood (figure skater) =

British ice dancer (1931–2022)

Personal information
- Full name: Jean Thomson Westwood
- Born: 1931 Manchester, England
- Died: 26 July 2022 (aged 90–91) British Columbia, Canada

Figure skating career
- Country: United Kingdom
- Partner: Lawrence Demmy
- Retired: 1955
Medal record
Figure skating
Ice dancing
Representing United Kingdom
Gold medal – first place	1955 Vienna	Ice dancing
Gold medal – first place	1954 Oslo	Ice dancing
Gold medal – first place	1953 Davos	Ice dancing
Gold medal – first place	1952 Paris	Ice dancing
European Championships
Gold medal – first place	1955 Budapest	Ice dancing
Gold medal – first place	1954 Bolzano	Ice dancing

Jean Thomson Westwood (1931 – 26 July 2022) was a British ice dancer. With partner Lawrence Demmy, she was the World Champion for four consecutive years, 1952 to 1955 (plus the unofficial trial event in 1951), and European Champion in its first two editions in 1954 and 1955. They were inducted into the World Figure Skating Hall of Fame in 1977.

She later became an elite-level coach in the United States and Canada (she had switched national teams, via a spell as skating director of the Ice Follies touring show, prior to the 1961 Sabena Flight 548 aviation disaster in which several former students and colleagues were killed). She was inducted into the Skate Canada Hall of Fame for her coaching services in 1997.

The Scottish long jumper Alix Jamieson (1964 Summer Olympics) was her second cousin.

== Results ==
(with Lawrence Demmy)

Event	1951	1952	1953	1954	1955
World Championships	1st*	1st	1st	1st	1st
European Championships				1st	1st
British Championships	2nd	2nd	1st	1st	1st
