= Jacqueline du Bief =

French figure skater (born 1930)

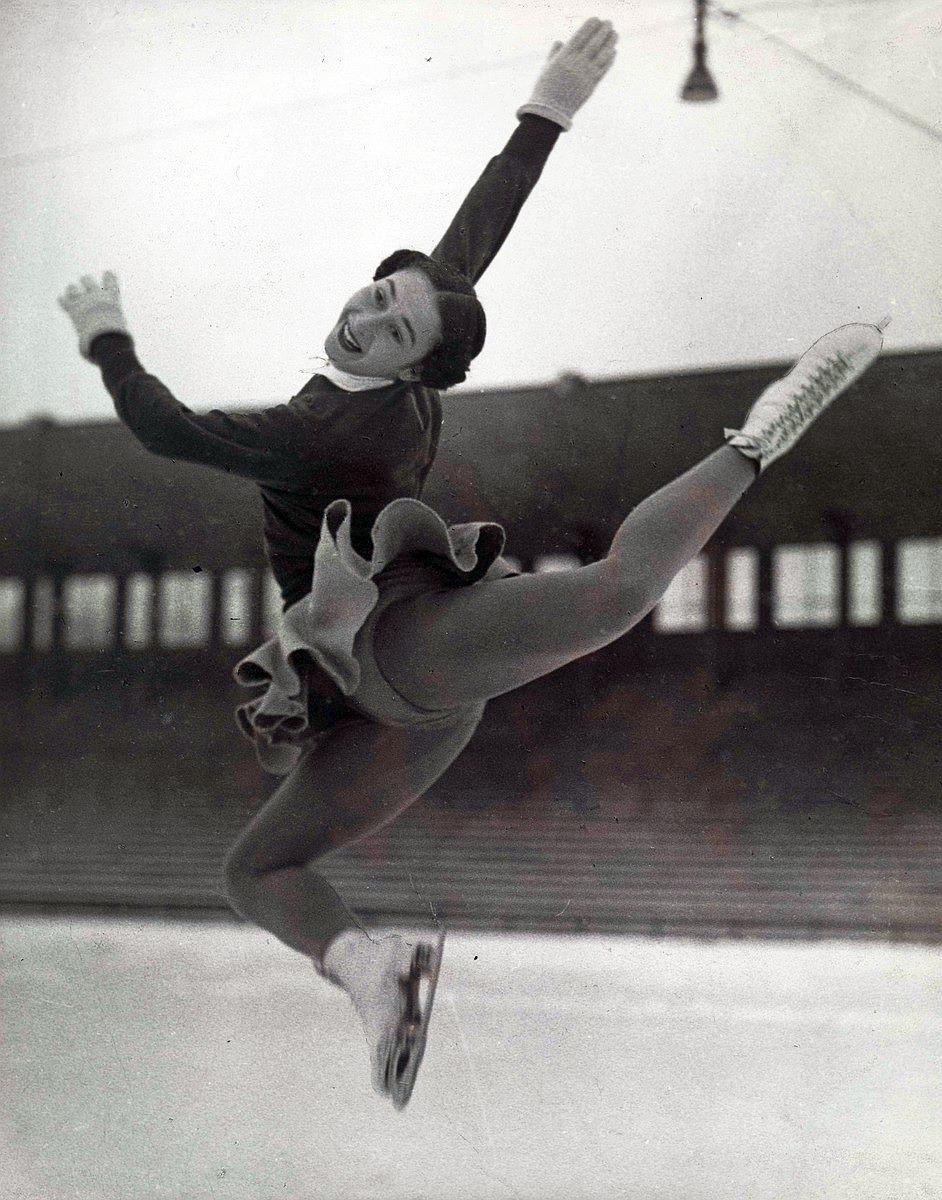
- Jacqueline du Bief, c. 1950

Personal information
- Born: 4 December 1930 (age 95) Paris, France

Figure skating career
- Country: France
- Skating club: De Glace Club Paris; Français Volants Paris
- Retired: 1952
Medal record
Representing France
Figure skating: Ladies' singles
Olympic Games
Bronze medal – third place	1952 Oslo	Ladies' singles
World Championships
Gold medal – first place	1952 Paris	Ladies' singles
Silver medal – second place	1951 Milan	Ladies' singles
European Championships
Silver medal – second place	1952 Vienna	Ladies' singles
Silver medal – second place	1951 Zürich	Ladies' singles
Bronze medal – third place	1950 Oslo	Ladies' singles

Jacqueline du Bief (born 4 December 1930) is a French retired figure skater who competed mainly in single skating. She is the 1952 Olympic bronze medalist, the 1952 World champion, a three-time European medalist, and a six-time French national champion (1947–1952).

== Early life ==
Bief was born in Paris. She began skating at age 7. She paused training due to World War II and then again for another two years due to illness. Her older sister, Raymonde, skated professionally.

== Career ==
Bief was known for being weak in compulsory figures but stronger in free skating, as well as her musicality and revealing costumes. As a pair skater, she competed with Tony Font, winning the 1950 & 1951 French national titles.

In 1949, Bief made an unusually large rise in placement after the free skate; she was in 16th place after the compulsory figures but finished in 9th place overall. A judge writing for Skating magazine noted her "truly outstanding, smooth flowing, ballet-like execution of a difficult program". The next year, she finished 6th at the 1950 World Championships. Skating magazine praised her free skate for powerful jumps, including a double Lutz jump, as well as her footwork. Three of the judges placed her first in the free skate segment.

In 1951, she won silver at both the European Championships and the World Championships. The following year, she again won silver at the 1952 European Championships. Later that month, she was the bronze medalist at the 1952 Winter Olympics. She performed an illusion spin during her free skate as well as a double Lutz and a double loop jump.

Going in to the 1952 World Championships, Bief had the advantage of skating in her home city, and the Olympic champion, Jeannette Altwegg, did not compete, while silver medalist, Tenley Albright withdrew early due to being ill. Bief won the competition over Sonya Klopfer and Virginia Baxter.

After the 1952 Championships, she turned professional. She toured with several shows like Ice Capades, Hollywood Ice Revues, Scala Eisrevue from 1952 to 1964.

== Competitive highlights ==
=== Ladies' singles ===
International
Event	1947	1948	1949	1950	1951	1952
Winter Olympics		16th				3rd
World Championships		18th	9th	6th	2nd	1st
European Championships			7th	3rd	2nd	2nd
National
French Championships	1st	1st	1st	1st	1st	1st

=== Pairs with Tony Font ===
National
Event	1950	1951
French Championships	1st	1st
