= Patricia Devries =

British figure skater (born 1930)

Personal information
- Nationality: British
- Born: 6 July 1930; Blackpool, England
- Died: 9 November 2014 (aged 84); Hungerford, England

Sport
- Sport: Figure skating

Florence Patricia Devries (6 July 1930 – 9 November 2014) was a British figure skater. She competed in the ladies' singles event at the 1952 Winter Olympics.

In 1953, she married three times world champion speedway rider Freddie Williams. She died on 9 November 2014 in Hungerford, aged 84.
