= Virginia Baxter =

American figure skater (1932–2014)

Personal information
- Born: December 3, 1932 Detroit, Michigan, U.S.
- Died: December 18, 2014 (aged 82)

Figure skating career
- Country: United States
- Retired: 1952
Medal record
Ladies' figure skating
Representing the United States
World Championships
Bronze medal – third place	1952 Paris	Ladies' singles
North American Championships
Bronze medal – third place	1949 Philadelphia	Ladies' singles

Virginia "Ginny" Baxter (December 3, 1932 – December 18, 2014) was an American figure skater from Detroit. She was born in Detroit, Michigan. She won the bronze medal at the United States Figure Skating Championships three times and captured the bronze at the 1952 World Figure Skating Championships (competition held March 1). Perhaps the high point of her career was the 1952 Winter Olympics, where she won the free skating portion of the event, placing 5th overall after an 8th place in the compulsory figures.

After her competitive career, she was part of Ice Capades' 1953 show called Land of Lollipops. She died on December 18, 2014.

== Results ==
Event	1947	1948	1949	1950	1951	1952
Winter Olympics						5th
World Championships			7th	7th		3rd
North American Championships			3rd			
U.S. Championships	4th J	1st J	3rd	3rd	3rd	
