= Hermann Braun (figure skater) =

German figure skater

Personal information
- Nationality: German
- Born: 29 May 1925; Cologne, Germany
- Died: 30 June 2002 (aged 77); Cologne, Germany

Sport
- Sport: Figure skating

Hermann Braun (29 May 1925 – 30 June 2002) was a German figure skater. He competed in the pairs event at the 1952 Winter Olympics.
