= World Figure Skating Hall of Fame =

World Figure Skating Museum & Hall of Fame
- Location: 20 First Street; Colorado Springs, Colorado
- Coordinates: 38°47′38″N 104°50′56″W
- Type: Hall of fame
- Website: www.worldskatingmuseum.org

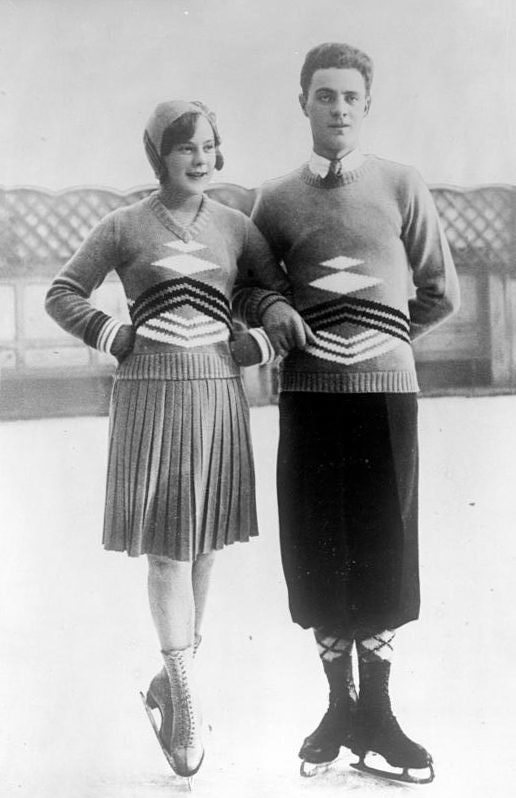
Sonja Henie and Karl Schäfer were among the initial 20 inductees to the Hall of Fame in 1976.

The World Figure Skating Hall of Museum and Hall of Fame is a museum and hall of fame for the sport of figure skating. It chronicles the history of the sport and honors the greatest names in figure skating and is recognized by the International Skating Union as the official world repository for figure skating records and history. It is located at the Broadmoor Resort in Colorado Springs, Colorado, United States. It also contains the United States Figure Skating Hall of Fame.

The Hall of Fame was founded in 1976.

Skaters such as Dick Button, Katarina Witt, Midori Ito, Sonja Henie, Alexei Yagudin, and Michelle Kwan have been honored in the Hall of Fame.

== Inductees ==
Skater	Year Inducted	Discipline
(United States) Tenley Albright	1976	
(France) Andrée Joly / (France) Pierre Brunet	1976	
(United States) Dick Button	1976	
(United States) Peggy Fleming	1976	
(Sweden) Gillis Grafström	1976	
(United States) Carol Heiss	1976	
(Norway) Sonja Henie	1976	
(United States) David Jenkins	1976	
(United Kingdom) T. D. Richardson	1976	
(Switzerland) Jacques Gerschwiler	1976	
(United States) Jackson Haines	1976	
(Switzerland) Gustave Lussi	1976	
(United States) Hayes Alan Jenkins	1976	
(Norway) Axel Paulsen	1976	
(Sweden) Ulrich Salchow	1976	
(Austria) Karl Schäfer	1976	
(United Kingdom) Reginald Wilkie	1976	
(United States) Howard Nicholson	1976	
(Austria) Edi Scholdan	1976	
(Canada) Montgomery Wilson	1976	
(Austria) Willy Böckl	1977	
(United Kingdom) Jean Westwood / (United Kingdom) Lawrence Demmy	1977	
(Canada) Donald Jackson	1977	
(Soviet Union) Ludmila Belousova / (Soviet Union) Oleg Protopopov	1978	
(Germany) Maxi Herber / (Germany) Ernst Baier	1979	
(Canada) Barbara Ann Scott	1979	
(United Kingdom) Cecilia Colledge	1980	
(Canada) Barbara Wagner / (Canada) Robert Paul	1980	
(United Kingdom) Madge Syers	1981	
(Germany) Willie Frick	1981	
(United States) William Hickok	1981	
(Austria) Herma Szabo	1982	
(Canada) Louis Rubenstein	1984	
(Switzerland) Werner Groebli	1984	
(Canada) Frances Dafoe / (Canada) Norris Bowden	1984	Pairs
Charlotte Oelschlägel	1985	
(Switzerland) Arnold Gerschwiler	1985	
(United States) F. Ritter Shumway	1986	
(United Kingdom) Courtney Jones	1986	
(Soviet Union) Lyudmila Pakhomova / (Soviet Union) Aleksandr Gorshkov	1988	
(Soviet Union) Irina Rodnina	1989	
(United Kingdom) Jayne Torvill / (United Kingdom) Christopher Dean	1989	
(United States) Scott Hamilton	1990	
(United Kingdom) John Curry	1991	
(United Kingdom) Jeannette Altwegg	1993	
(United States) Richard Dwyer	1993	
(Germany) Ria Falk / (Germany) Paul Falk	1993	
(France) Jacques Favart	1993	
(Switzerland) Georg Hasler	1993	
(United States) Ronald Robertson	1993	
(United Kingdom) Diane Towler / (United Kingdom) Bernard Ford	1993	
(Switzerland) James Koch	1994	
(Russia) Ekaterina Gordeeva / (Russia) Sergei Grinkov	1995	
(United States) William Tutt	1995	
(Germany) Katarina Witt	1995	
(United States) Brian Boitano	1996	
(United Kingdom) Herbert Clarke	1996	
(Canada) Sheldon Galbraith	1996	
(United States) Carlo Fassi	1997	
(Hungary) Lily Kronberger	1997	
(United States) Benjamin Wright	1997	
(United States) Tom Collins	1998	
(Czech Republic) Josef Dědič	1998	
(Austria) Felix Kaspar	1998	
(United States) Kristi Yamaguchi	1998	
(United States) Ronald Ludington	1999	
(United Kingdom) Gladys Hogg	1999	
(United States) Dorothy Hamill	2000	Ladies' Singles
(Soviet Union) Marina Klimova / (Soviet Union) Sergei Ponomarenko	2000	Ice Dance
(United Kingdom) John Nicks	2000	Coach
(United States) Janet Lynn	2001	Ladies' Singles
(United States) Maribel Vinson	2002	Ladies' Singles and Pairs
(Germany) Jutta Müller	2004	Coach
(Canada) Toller Cranston	2004	Men's Singles
(Japan) Midori Ito	2004	Ladies' Singles
(United Kingdom) Robin Cousins	2005	Men's Singles; Creative/Professional role
(Russia) Tamara Moskvina	2005	Pairs and Ladies' Singles; Coach
(Canada) Donald Gilchrist	2005	Non-athletic role
(Canada) Kurt Browning	2006	Men's Singles
(United States) Frank Zamboni	2006	Skating Pioneer
(United States) Frank Carroll	2007	Coach
(Russia) Tatiana Tarasova	2008	Coach
(Austria) Wilhelm Bietak	2009	Creative/Professional role
(Canada) Joyce Hisey	2009	Non-athletic role Judge
(Canada) Brian Orser	2009	Men's Singles; Coach
(Russia) Nikolai Panin	2009	Special Figures
(Canada) Barbara Underhill / (Canada) Paul Martini	2009	Pairs
(Czech Republic) Alena Vrzáňová	2009	Ladies' Singles
(Japan) Nobuo Satō	2010	Coach
(United States) Michelle Kwan	2012	Ladies' Singles
(Sweden) Viktor Balck	2013	Non-athletic role ISU President
(Netherlands) Sjoukje Dijkstra	2013	Ladies' Singles
(Germany) Ludowika Eilers-Jakobsson / (Finland) Walter Jakobsson	2013	Pairs
(Switzerland) Denise Biellmann	2014	Ladies' Singles
(Canada) Lori Nichol	2014	Choreographer
(Germany) Anna Hübler / (Germany) Heinrich Burger *	2014	Pairs
(Austria) Friedrich Kachler *	2014	Men's Singles; Non-athletic role
(Italy) Sonia Bianchetti Garbato	2015	Non-athletic role
(Russia) Artur Dmitriev / (Russia) Natalia Mishkutionok/ (Russia) Oksana Kazakova**	2015	Pairs
(United Kingdom) Doreen Denny ***	2015	Ice dance
(Austria) Eduard Engelmann Jr. ***	2015	Skating pioneer
(United Kingdom) June Markham ***	2015	Ice dance
(United Kingdom) Henry Eugene Vandervell ***	2015	Skating pioneer
(Canada) Sarah Kawahara	2017	Choreographer
(Russia) Alexei Mishin	2017	Coach
(Austria) Trixi Schuba	2017	Ladies' Singles
(China) Shen Xue / (China) Zhao Hongbo	2017	Pairs
(Russia) Alexei Yagudin	2017	Men's Singles
(Sweden) Vivi-Anne Hultén ***	2017	Ladies' Singles; Coach
(United Kingdom) Phyllis Johnson / (United Kingdom) James H. Johnson ***	2017	Pairs
(Germany) Werner Rittberger ***	2017	Skating pioneer
(Switzerland) Hans-Rudi Mauch ***	2017	Creative/Professional role
(Japan) Shizuka Arakawa	2018	
(Canada) Sandra Bezic	2018	
(Austria) Emmerich Danzer ***	2018	
(Soviet Union) Irina Moiseeva & Andrei Minenkov	2018	
(Soviet Union) Viktor Petrenko	2018	
(United States) Richard Porter ***	2018	
(Soviet Union) Elena Valova & Oleg Vasiliev	2018	
(China) Bin Yao	2018	
(Soviet Union) Natalya Bestemyanova & Andrey Bukin	2019	
(Slovakia) Ondrej Nepela	2019	
(Czechoslovakia) Eva Romanova *** and Pavel Roman ***	2019	
(East Germany) Gabriele Seyfert	2019	
(Soviet Union) Yelena Tchaikovskaya	2019	

There have been no further inductions since 2019. There have been consistent inductions for U.S. figure skating contributions since 2019. https://usfigureskating.org/sports/2025/9/18/hall-of-fame.aspx

* Indicates that they were inducted into the golden category, which considers contributions prior to WWII.
** Dmitriev was inducted with both partners he won Olympic gold with
*** Indicates that they were inducted into the legends category, which considers contributions prior to 1960.

== See also ==
- Skate Canada Hall of Fame
- United States Figure Skating Hall of Fame
