= Peri Horne =

British figure skater (born 1932)

Personal information
- Full name: Peri Victoria Horne
- Nationality: British
- Born: 21 April 1932 (age 94) London, England

Sport
- Sport: Figure skating

Peri Victoria Horne (born 21 April 1932) is a British figure skater. She competed in the pairs event at the 1952 Winter Olympics.
