= Inge Minor =

German figure skater (born 1929)

Personal information
- Nationality: German
- Born: 26 November 1929 Cologne, Germany

Sport
- Sport: Figure skating

Inge Minor (born 26 November 1929) was a German figure skater. She competed in the pairs event at the 1952 Winter Olympics.
