= Michael Carrington (figure skater) =

British figure skater

Figure skating career
- Country: United Kingdom
- Retired: 1952

Michael Carrington is a British former figure skater. He is the 1952 European bronze medalist. He trained in London at the Queen's Ice Skating Club.

== Competitive highlights ==
International
| Event | 1949 | 1950 | 1951 | 1952 |
|---|---|---|---|---|
| World Championships | | 6th | 8th | |
| European Championships | | | 4th | 3rd |
National
| British Championships | | 1st | 1st | |
