= Freimut Stein =

German figure skater (1924–1986)

Personal information
- Born: June 16, 1924 Nuremberg, Germany
- Died: September 15, 1986 (aged 62) Munich, West Germany

Figure skating career
- Country: West Germany
Medal record
Representing West Germany
Men's Figure skating
European Championships
Bronze medal – third place	1953 Dortmund	Men's singles

Freimut Stein (June 16, 1924 – September 15, 1986) was a German figure skater. Stein was a single male skater and the German champion from 1952 to 1954. In 1953, he won the bronze medal at the European championships. He represented the club 1. FC Nürnberg section Roll- und Eissport. From 1950 to 1954, he was also the German champion in roller skating. He was the roller skate world champion in 1951 and 1952. After his skating career, he became a figure skating judge. In 1964, his book Eiskunstlaufen: eine Einführung (Figure skating: an introduction) was published. Dr. Freimut Stein continued writing books about various subjects.

== Competitive highlights in figure skating ==
Event	1948	1949	1950	1951	1952	1953	1954
Olympic Winter Games					8th		
World Championships				10th		10th	
European Championships				5th	6th	3rd	
German Championships	3rd	3rd		2nd	1st	1st	1st
