= Bjørg Løhner Øien =

Norwegian figure skater

Bjørg Løhner Øien (10 May 1928 – 20 February 2015) was a Norwegian figure skater. She competed at the 1952 Winter Olympics in Oslo. She was Norwegian champion in figure skating in 1952.

== Results ==
| Event | 1950 | 1951 | 1952 |
|---|---|---|---|
| Winter Olympic Games | | | WD |
| European Championships | 14th | 16th | |
| Norwegian Championships | | | 1st |
