= Erica Batchelor =

British figure skater (born 1933)

Personal information
- Full name: Erica Anne Batchelor
- Born: 10 August 1933 (age 92) Poole, England

Figure skating career
- Country: Great Britain
- Coach: her father
Medal record
Representing Great Britain
Ladies' Figure skating
World Championships
Bronze medal – third place	1954 Oslo	Ladies' singles
European Championships
Bronze medal – third place	1956 Paris	Ladies' singles
Bronze medal – third place	1955 Budapest	Ladies' singles
Silver medal – second place	1954 Budapest	Ladies' singles
Bronze medal – third place	1953 Dortmund	Ladies' singles

Erica Anne Batchelor (born 10 August 1933) is a British figure skater. She is the 1954 World bronze medalist, the 1953 European silver medalist and three-time (1953, 1955 & 1956) European bronze medalist. She represented Great Britain at the 1956 Winter Olympics, where she placed 11th. She resided in Edinburgh, Scotland in 1957 and left there for Bournemouth, England to turn professional. She had her portrait painted in Edinburgh, Scotland by Paul Seton Bramley in 1957. The same painter offered to the skater's friend Russ Christensen, who had accompanied the skater to portrait sessions, to do his portrait. The offer was accepted.

== Results ==
Event	1952	1953	1954	1955	1956	1957
Winter Olympics					11th	
World Championships	9th	9th	3rd	5th	8th	9th
European Championships	10th	3rd	2nd	3rd	3rd	5th
British Championships		3rd	2nd	2nd	2nd	1st
