= Peter Kennedy (figure skater) =

American pair skater

Personal information
- Full name: Michael Edward Kennedy III
- Born: September 4, 1927 (age 98) Olympia, Washington, U.S.

Figure skating career
- Partner: Karol Kennedy
- Skating club: Seattle Skating Club; Broadmoor Skating Club
- Retired: 1952
Medal record
Pairs' figure skating
Representing United States
Olympic Games
Silver medal – second place	1952 Oslo	Pairs
World Championships
Silver medal – second place	1952 Paris	Pairs
Silver medal – second place	1951 Milan	Pairs
Gold medal – first place	1950 London	Pairs
Silver medal – second place	1949 Paris	Pairs
Silver medal – second place	1947 Stockholm	Pairs
North American Championships
Gold medal – first place	1951 Calgary	Pairs
Gold medal – first place	1949 Philadelphia	Pairs
Bronze medal – third place	1947 Ottawa	Pairs

Michael Edward "Peter" Kennedy III (born September 4, 1927) is an American retired pair skater. Although named Michael, he was nicknamed Peter as a child, and has been credited in competition by both names. With his sister, Karol, he won five U.S. Championship titles from 1948 to 1952. Known as "The Kennedy Kids", they won the World Championship in 1950, and the silver medal in the 1952 Winter Olympics. He was born in Olympia, Washington.

== Competitive highlights ==
(all with Karol)

Event	1946	1947	1948	1949	1950	1951	1952
Winter Olympic Games			6th				2nd
World Championships		2nd	4th	2nd	1st	2nd	2nd
North American Championships		3rd		1st		1st	
U.S. Championships	2nd	2nd	1st	1st	1st	1st	1st
