= Helga Dudzinski =

German figure skater (1929–2022)

Personal information
- Full name: Helga Rosa Maria Dudzinski
- Born: 4 June 1929 Munich
- Died: 28 October 2022 (aged 93)

Figure skating career
- Country: West Germany
- Skating club: EV Füssen

Helga Rosa Maria Dudzinski (4 June 1929 – 28 October 2022) was a German figure skater. She was a three-time German national champion. A member of EV Füssen, she placed 12th at the 1952 Winter Olympics in Oslo, Norway. Dudzinski was born in Munich, the daughter of a Bavarian state official, and started skating at the age of eight.

== Competitive highlights ==
International
Event	1949	1950	1951	1952	1953
Winter Olympics				12th	
World Championships			12th	11th	WD
European Championships			7th	5th	4th
National
German Championships	1st	1st	1st	3rd	2nd
WD: Withdrew
