= Lidy Stoppelman =

Dutch figure skater

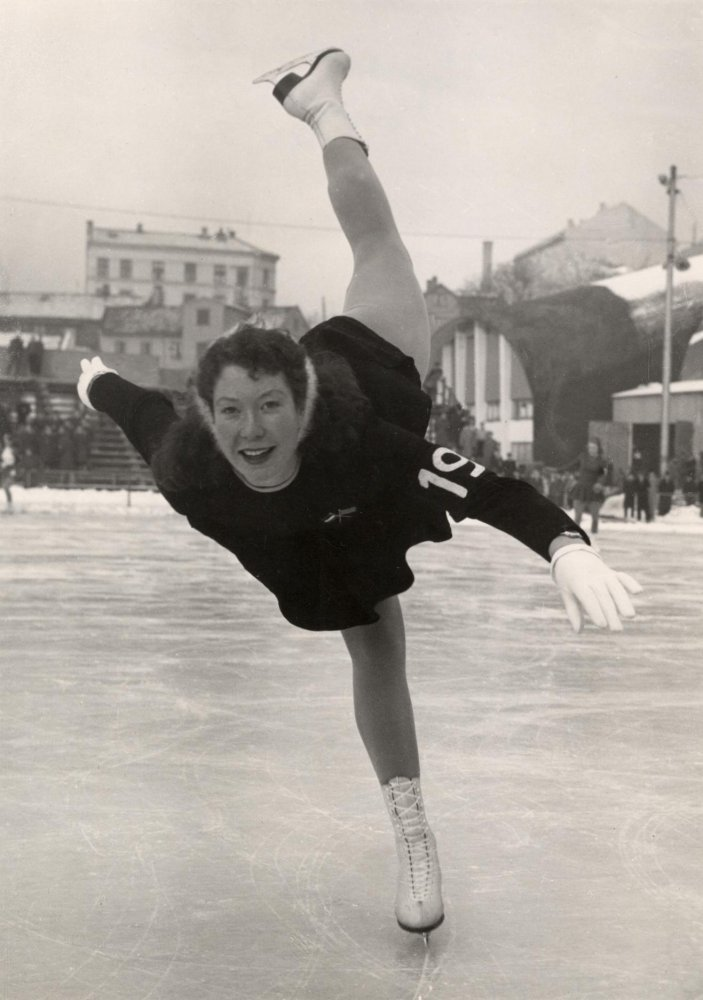
- Lidy Stoppelman in 1952

Personal information
- Full name: Alida Elisabeth Stoppelman
- Born: 3 July 1933 (age 93) Amsterdam, Netherlands

Figure skating career
- Country: Netherlands
- Retired: c. 1954

Alida Elisabeth "Lidy" Stoppelman (born 3 July 1933 in Amsterdam) is a Dutch former figure skater. She won three national titles and competed at the 1952 Winter Olympics in Oslo, Norway.

== Results ==
International
Event	49–50	1950–51	1951–52	1952–53	1953–54
Winter Olympics			22nd		
World Championships		22nd	17th	19th	
European Champ.		15th	21st	9th	13th
Richmond Trophy				2nd	3rd
National
Dutch Championships	3rd	1st	1st	1st	
