= Susi Wirz =

Swiss figure skater

Personal information
- Full name: Suzanne Wirz
- Born: 30 November 1931 (age 94) Bern, Switzerland

Figure skating career
- Country: Switzerland

Suzanne "Susi" Wirz (born 30 November 1931) is a Swiss figure skater. She is the 1952 Swiss national champion. Wirz represented Switzerland at the 1952 Winter Olympics where she placed 15th. She was the sister-in-law of British figure skater Jeannette Altwegg.

== Competitive highlights ==
Event	1950	1951	1952
Winter Olympic Games			15th
World Championships		15th	
European Championships	11th	9th	12th
Swiss Championships			1st
