= Michel Grandjean =

Swiss figure skater (1931–2010)

Personal information
- Born: 12 April 1931
- Died: 11 December 2010 (aged 79)

Figure skating career
- Country: Switzerland
Medal record
Pairs' figure skating
Representing Switzerland
World Championships
Silver medal – second place	1954 Oslo	Pairs
European Championships
Gold medal – first place	1954 Bolzano	Pairs

Michel Grandjean (12 April 1931 – 11 December 2010) was a Swiss pair skater. With his sister Silvia Grandjean, he won the 1954 European Figure Skating Championships. They placed 7th at the 1952 Winter Olympics. The also participated at various skating shows including Ice Capades and Holiday on Ice.

== Results ==
(pairs with Silvia Grandjean)

Event	1951	1952	1953	1954
Winter Olympic Games		7th		
World Championships	7th	6th	4th	2nd
European Championships	4th	4th		1st
Swiss Championships		1st	1st	1st
