= Valda Osborn =

British figure skater (1934–2022)

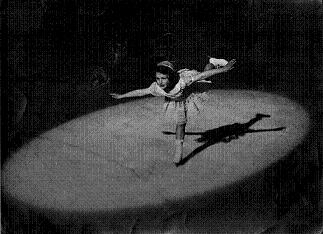

Personal information
- Full name: Valda Rosemary Osborn
- Other names: Valda Foggin
- Born: 17 September 1934 Wembley, Middlesex, England
- Died: 28 December 2022 (aged 88) Horsham, West Sussex, England

Figure skating career
- Country: Great Britain
- Retired: 1953
Medal record
Representing Great Britain
Ladies' Figure skating
World Championships
Bronze medal – third place	1953 Davos	Ladies' singles
European Championships
Gold medal – first place	1953 Dortmund	Ladies' singles

Valda Rosemary Foggin (née Osborn; 17 September 1934 – 28 December 2022) was a British figure skater. She was the 1953 European champion and World bronze medalist. Osborn represented her country at the 1952 Winter Olympics in Oslo, Norway, where she placed 11th.

== Early life ==
Osborn was born in Wembley, Middlesex on 17 September 1934. During the Second World War, she moved to Richmond (then in Surrey), and lived close to Richmond Bridge, a short walk to Richmond Ice Rink. She had private tutors for her schooling.

== Career ==
Osborn started skating, aged 2½, at Wembley Ice Rink. She was taught by Arnold Gerschwiler, who was her only coach during her entire amateur career. At age 5, Osborn won her first competition for "Under Sixes". During the Second World War, the Wembley rink was closed to save electricity. She moved to the Richmond Ice Rink, the only rink left open during the war. At 9½ years she passed the NSA gold medal at Richmond Ice Rink on 6 June 1944 (D-Day). She was the youngest skater to pass her Gold and continues to hold the record.

Osborn continued skating at Richmond during and after the war. She became the British national champion in 1952 and was selected for the 1952 Winter Olympics, where she finished 11th. In 1953, Osborn won her second national title and went on to win gold at the European Championships in Dortmund. After her victory in Germany, she was awarded the Harry E. Radix skating pin. Osborn remains the last British skater to win the European title in ladies' singles. Later in 1953, she won the bronze medal at the World Championships in Davos, Switzerland.

During her amateur career, Osborn was featured in British magazines such as Everybody's Weekly (20 December 1947) and Weekly Illustrated (26 January 1952). She was also interviewed on the BBC radio show In Town Tonight.

Osborn turned professional in 1953. She starred in Tom Arnold's Ice Circus in Brighton and Tom Arnold's Robinson Crusoe on Ice in the winter of 1953 at the Grand Theatre, Leeds. Osborn then turned to coaching ice skaters in Manchester, Whitley Bay, Brighton and finally in Richmond. When Richmond Ice Rink closed down and the property was redeveloped, she retired.

== Personal life ==
After turning professional in 1953, Osborn resided in Brighton, Whitley Bay, Manchester and Feltham. Following the end of her performing career, she travelled around Europe, North Africa and the Middle East. She spent thirteen years in Northern Cyprus and then settled in Rustington, West Sussex, on the English south coast.

Osborn died in Horsham, West Sussex on 28 December 2022, at the age of 88.

== Results ==
International
Event	1949	1950	1951	1952	1953
Winter Olympics				11th	
World Championships	12th	13th	9th	8th	3rd
European Championships	9th		4th	5th	1st
National
British Championships				1st	1st
