= Yolande Jobin =

Swiss figure skater

Personal information
- Full name: Yolande Jobin
- Born: 30 May 1930 London
- Died: 11 October 2010 (aged 80) Canton de Vaud, Chexbres, Switzerland

Figure skating career
- Country: Switzerland
- Coach: Arnold Gerschwiler

Yolande Jobin (30 May 1930 – 11 October 2010) was a Swiss figure skater. She was the 1951 Swiss national champion. She represented Switzerland at the 1952 Winter Olympics where she placed 18th. After the 1953 World Championships in Davos she retired from competitive skating. She then spent several Winters in Crans coaching young people at the ice rink. In the early 1960s she retired from all skating and settled in La Tour de Peilz near Vevey with her parents who had retired there from London. She spent the rest of her life there, looking after her elderly parents. She never married.

== Competitive highlights ==
Event	1950	1951	1952	1953
Winter Olympic Games			18th	
World Championships		17th	18th	17th
European Championships	12th	11th	13th	
Swiss Championships		1st		
