= Figure skating at the 1952 Winter Olympics =

Figure skating at the VI Winter Olympics
- Type: Olympic Games
- Venue: Bislett Stadium

Champions
- Men's singles: (United States) Dick Button
- Ladies' singles: (United Kingdom) Jeannette Altwegg
- Pairs: (Germany) Ria Baran / Paul Falk
- Previous: 1948 Winter Olympics
- Next: 1956 Winter Olympics

At the 1952 Winter Olympics, three figure skating events were contested. Compulsory figures were skated at the outdoor Jordal Amfi rink, while the free skating portions of the competition were held at the huge Bislett Stadium, on a regulation-sized ice surface set inside the speed skating track. The competition opened with the ladies' figures on 16 and 17 February, followed by the men's figures on 19 February and then the three free skating events for ladies, men, and pairs. Somewhat unusually for competitions of this era, there were no particular problems with bad weather or poor ice conditions at the outdoor rinks. At this competition, Dick Button won his second Olympic title, and also became the first skater to land a triple jump—a triple loop jump—in competition.

== Medalists ==
Event	Gold	Silver	Bronze
Men's singles	Dick Button; United States	Helmut Seibt; Austria	James Grogan; United States
Ladies' singles	Jeannette Altwegg; Great Britain	Tenley Albright; United States	Jacqueline du Bief; France
Pairs skating	Ria Baran / Paul Falk; Germany	Karol Kennedy / Peter Kennedy; United States	Marianna Nagy / László Nagy; Hungary

== Participating nations ==
- Australia (3)
- Austria (4)
- Canada (6)
- Denmark (1)
- Finland (2)
- France (2)
- Germany (8)
- Great Britain (8)
- Hungary (6)
- Italy (1)
- Netherlands (1)
- Norway (4)
- Sweden (2)
- Switzerland (5)
- United States (10)

== Medal table ==
Rank	Nation	Gold	Silver	Bronze	Total
1	United States	1	2	1	4
2	Germany	1	0	0	1
2	Great Britain	1	0	0	1
4	Austria	0	1	0	1
5	France	0	0	1	1
5	Hungary	0	0	1	1
Totals (6 entries)		3	3	3	9
