= Sollenberger (disambiguation) =

Sollenberger may refer to:

== People with the surname ==
- Eric Sollenberger (born 1985), also known as PFT Commenter, American podcaster on Pardon My Take
- Isobel Sollenberger, flute player and vocalist for the band, Bardo Pond
- John B. Sollenberger (1897–1967), American sports and entertainment executive who helped develop Hershey, Pennsylvania
- Paul Sollenberger (1891–1995), American astronomer and namesake of a minor planet

== Other ==
- John B. Sollenberger Trophy, trophy given to the American Hockey League's leading scorer for the season
- Minor Planet 5367 Sollenberger

== See also ==
- Sollenberger (surname)
- Sullenberger
