= Donna Atwood =

American figure skater

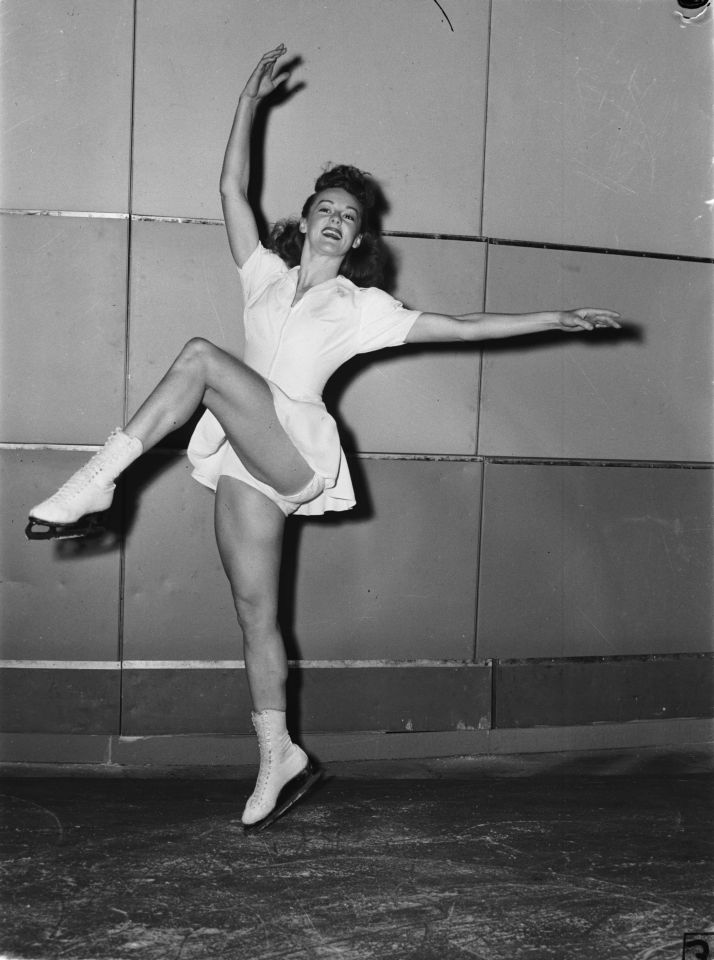

Personal information
- Born: February 14, 1925
- Died: December 20, 2010 (aged 85)

Figure skating career
- Country: United States
- Partner: Eugene Turner (former)
- Retired: 1956
Medal record
Representing United States
Pairs' Figure skating
North American Championships
Silver medal – second place	1941 Philadelphia	Pairs

Donna Arlene Atwood (February 14, 1925 – December 20, 2010) was an American figure skater. She was known as "The Sweetheart of the Ice" while skating with the Ice Capades. After touring for fifteen years, she retired to raise her children at the height of her career, later returning to the sport to couch young ice skaters.

== Early life ==
She was born in Newton, Kansas, to pharmacist Chester Atwood and Allie Atwood, his wife. The family moved to Albuquerque before relocating to Los Angeles when she was 9. Her father died when she was 13.

== Career ==
Atwood began taking dancing lessons at age 3. Her skating began at age 13, when she was inspired by seeing a Sonja Henie ice show, and was given her first pair of skates by her older brother. At age 15, she won two medals at the 1941 U.S. Figure Skating Championships: the senior pairs title with partner Eugene Turner and the junior ladies title.

That same year, John H. Harris, operating owner of the Ice Capades, offered her a contract with his show. She signed with the Ice Capades at age 16, and within a year she was its star, billed as "The Sweetheart of the Ice". She toured with the show for fifteen years, giving over 6,000 performances in two dozen venues. She was so famous that newspaper headlines of the day referred to her only as "Donna". Her partners were Jimmy Lawrence and, for almost 20 years, Bobby Specht, the U.S. men's champion in 1942. On her farewell tour, she starred in a production of Peter Pan, making her entrance flying above the audience. She often spoke of it as her favorite role.

She was one of two human models studied as references for the ice skating sequence in the 1942 animated Disney movie Bambi.

Atwood retired from the role of lead skater in 1956 at age 31, moving into a custom-built Beverly Hills home complete with a piano that folded into the wall. She made a single television appearance in 1961 as Phyllis Merrill in the Perry Mason episode, "The Case of the Renegade Refugee."

In the 1970s, when her children were grown and she was "tired of doing nothing," she began coaching young figure skaters in California.

== Personal life ==
In 1949, Atwood married her mentor John H. Harris, 27 years her senior, with whom she had twin sons Don and Dennis in 1950, and a daughter named Donna in 1952.

To facilitate her travel with young children, the Ice Capades props department used a 10-foot traveling trunk to build a portable nursery that could be rolled into her hotel room. When her sons reached school age, she retired from skating. She was 31 years old, and at the peak of her career.

Atwood and Harris divorced in 1959. Atwood never remarried, eventually moving to Marina del Rey and Palm Desert, California.

Atwood died on December 20, 2010, of respiratory problems at the Motion Picture & Television Country House and Hospital in Woodland Hills. She was 85 years old and survived by her two sons, daughter and five grandchildren.

== Results ==
(pairs with Eugene Turner)

Event	1941
North American Championships	2nd
U.S. Championships	1st

(ladies singles)

Event	1941
U.S. Championships	1st J
