= Backflip (figure skating) =

Figure skating technique

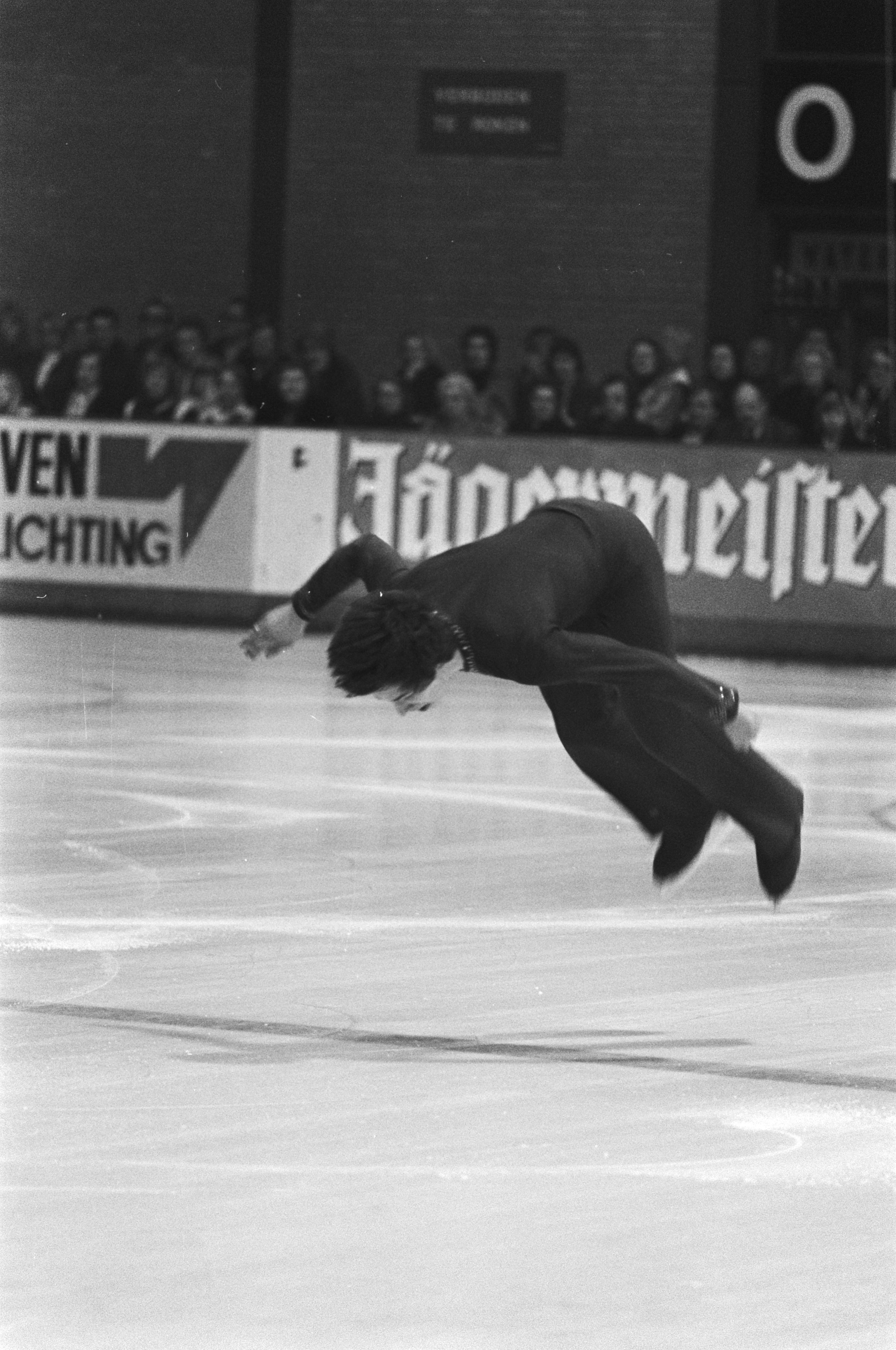
Terry Kubicka executing a backflip, 1976

A backflip is a move in figure skating. American Terry Kubicka was the first skater to successfully execute a legal backflip at the Olympics, during the 1976 Winter Olympics. The International Skating Union (ISU), the organization that oversees figure skating, banned the backflip in 1977 because it was deemed too dangerous and because skaters landed on two blades, which was in violation of the principle of landing on one skate. Skaters continued to perform the move in ice shows and other non-competitive shows. Until 2024, the backflip was listed as an "illegal element/movement" on the official scoresheet used by judges during competition.

Surya Bonaly from France was the first skater to successfully complete a backflip on one blade at the Olympics, during her free skating program at the 1998 Winter Olympics, even though it was illegal at the time. According to The Washington Post, "the moment quickly became a cultural touchstone" and "Bonaly was making a statement not only as an accomplished skater, but also as a black athlete in one of the world's whitest sports".

The next time the backflip was done in competition was in 2024, at the European Championships, by French skater Adam Siao Him Fa, during his free skating program and while it was still an illegal move. He also completed a backflip during his free skating program at the 2024 World Championships. The ban against backflips was lifted later in 2024, when it and other somersault type jumps were removed from the ISU's list of restricted moves and elements. The backflip is not assigned a points value and is not a required element but can be included as part of the choreographic sequence during the free skating program.

The backflip is executed by skating backwards. One variation of the move, named for Bonaly, occurs when the skater throws both arms upwards to create momentum, dips the left knee to create power, kicks the right leg backwards to execute the flip, and ends it by landing on the left leg. Another variation is executed by landing on both feet. Completing the backflip has been described as "just a pick and a look back". Training for the backflip is done with the use of support ropes around the skater's waist, as well as the use of a harness and a helmet. Skaters and coaches acknowledge both the potential risk of performing backflips and the excitement the audience expresses about seeing them during ice shows and competitions.

== History ==
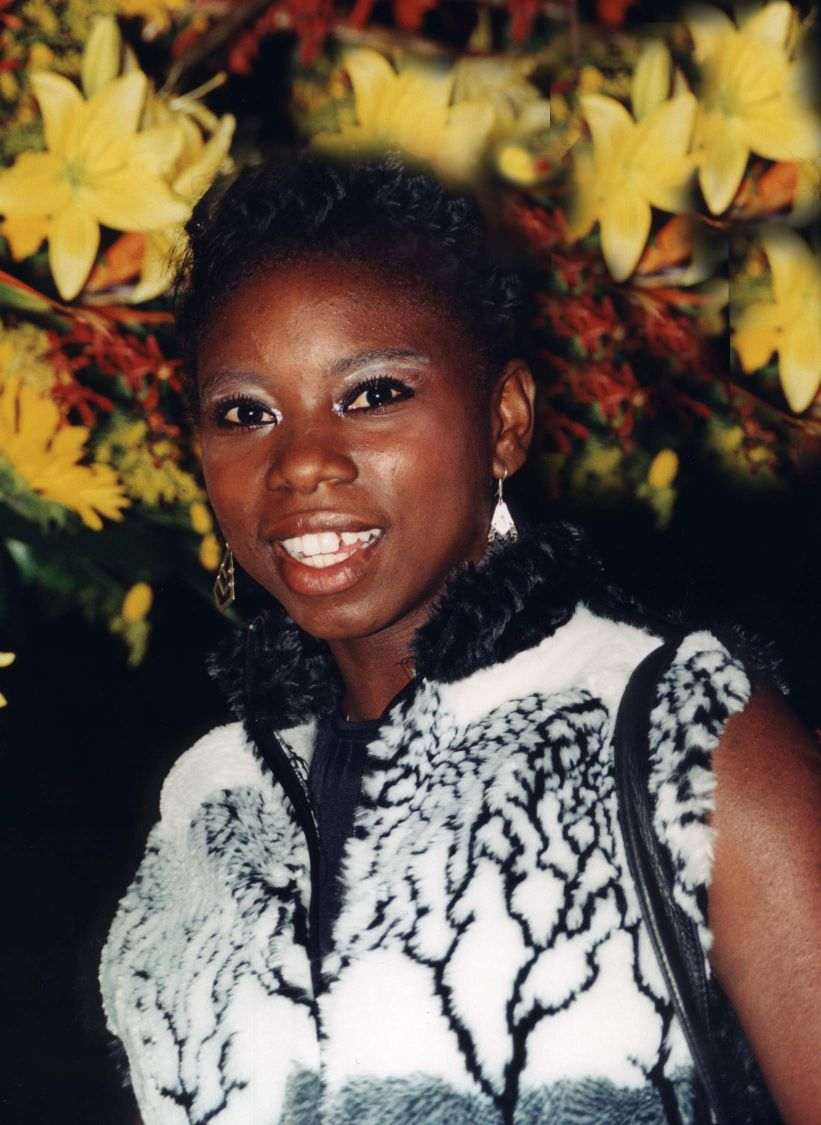
Surya Bonaly in 2010

Terry Kubicka from the U.S. was the first figure skater to successfully execute a legal backflip at the Olympics, during the 1976 Winter Olympics. Kubicka got the idea of using the backflip in his skating from Evy Scotvold, his coach, who wanted to help advance athleticism in figure skating and to go beyond the triple jumps that were the most difficult elements in the sport at the time. In 1976, in addition to landing a backflip at the Olympics, where Kubicka came in seventh place, he also landed the move at the U.S. Championships, which he won, and at the Worlds Championships, when he came in sixth place. Kubicka later said that he did not think the move influenced skaters' scores, adding, "I don't know if they really knew how to judge it or approach it". The International Skating Union (ISU), the organization that oversees figure skating, banned the backflip in 1977 because it was deemed too dangerous and because it "violated one of the sport's principles of landing on one skate". Skaters continued to perform the move in ice shows and other non-competitive shows; Kubicka, who became a veterinarian after retiring from figure skating, estimated that he executed it hundreds of times during the three years he performed with the Ice Capades. As of 2024, the backflip was listed as an "illegal element/movement" on the official scoresheet used by judges during competition.

French skater Surya Bonaly was the first skater to successfully complete a backflip on one blade at the Olympics, during the 1998 Winter Olympics, even though it was illegal at the time. In 2018, she said in a TEDx talk that her mother, Suzanne Bonaly, encouraged her to practice "forbidden" moves like the backflip, even though her coach "told her off" for attempting them. During a practice session for the short program at the 1992 Winter Olympics, Bonaly did a backflip and landed "very close" to Midori Ito from Japan. According to The Baltimore Sun, Ito's final rehearsal before competition was interrupted and Ito "never regained her composure", which caused her to fall during the short program, and she came in fourth place. Bonaly received "a rare warning from the referee of the women's competition" during a practice session the following day. Ben Wright, a referee from the U.S., told Suzanne Bonaly before practice that her daughter was not permitted to do the move, something she regularly performed during her exhibition programs. Suzanne Bonaly was furious about the reprimand, but her daughter did not execute the move during the practice session. The Baltimore Sun also stated that for two years, figure skating officials like Wright had suspected Bonaly of using the backflip to intimidate other skaters.

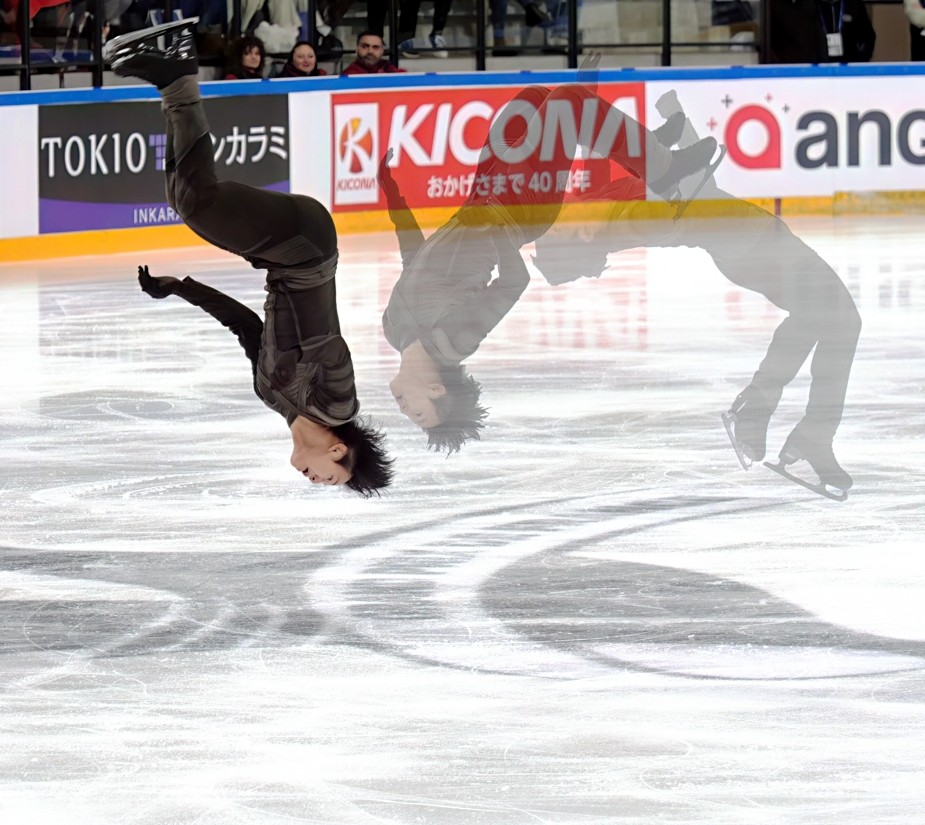
Adam Siao Him Fa performing a backflip at the 2024 Grand Prix de France

At the 1998 Olympics, Bonaly was injured and recovering from a severe ruptured Achilles tendon that had threatened to end her figure skating career two years earlier, so she considered dropping out of the competition. She knew that she was not going to win or place, so she decided to compete anyway and to "leave the ice giving people something to talk about". In a 2016 interview, she said that she was in pain towards the end of her free skating program, and instead of doing the last two triples jumps she had planned because she knew that she would not be able to do them, she decided to do a backflip. She also did the backflip as a protest against the lack of respect and approval of the ISU judges she felt she had experienced throughout her career and for the audience, whom she knew it would please. As Rhiannon Walker of The New York Times put it, "So she spurned the judges and their approval. And in the end, executed a move that is now referred to by her last name". The judges gave Bonaly low scores, dropping her from sixth place after the short program to tenth place overall. Then-ISU president Ottovio Cinquanta later said, "As a human, 10 percent of me approved, and 90 percent as ISU president disapproved". The Washington Post stated that performing the backflip ended Bonaly's career, but "the moment quickly became a cultural touchstone", adding that "Bonaly was making a statement not only as an accomplished skater, but also as a black athlete in one of the world's whitest sports". She estimated that she landed the backflip over 1,000 times during ice shows; the last one was at a show in São Paulo, Brazil, at the age of 40.

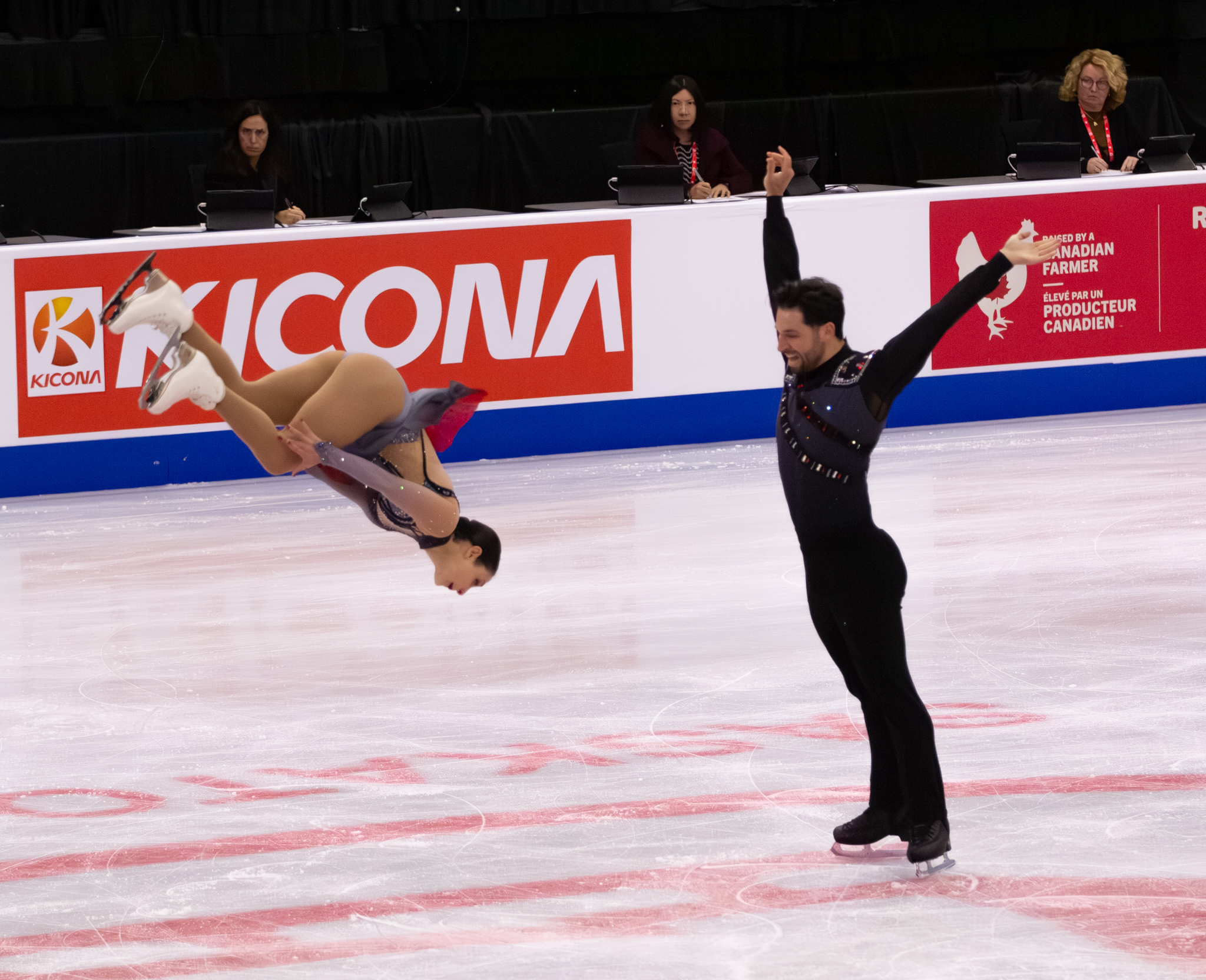
Deanna Stellato-Dudek and Maxime Deschamps performing an assisted backflip at the 2025 Skate Canada International

For the next 25 years, as NBC Sports put it, the backflip "remained in figure skating's background". Bonaly's story was retold every four years during the Olympics and skaters performed it in ice shows. The next time the backflip was done in competition was in 2024, at the European Championships, by French skater Adam Siao Him Fa. He won the gold medal by more than 20 points for the second time in a row, even though the move was still illegal, telling the spectators, "I've actually done this back flip for you people. It's a little French touch". NBC Sports called it "a throwback to the move trademarked by countrywoman Surya Bonaly". Siao Him Fa received a two-point deduction, which did not affect the outcome of the competition. He later said that he started adding the backflip in competition to push figure skating forward and to "provide opportunities for himself and other skaters to express themselves".

Siao Him Fa again executed the backflip during his free skating program at the 2024 Worlds Championships, after coming in 19th place during the short program; he came in third place overall. Kubicka was an official on the technical panel during Worlds; he later said, "It was our responsibility as a technical panel to call it illegal and make a deduction". Kubicka later told U.S. Figure Skating that he was able to recognize the irony in having to make the deduction in Siao Him Fa's scores and called it "a full circle moment for me". He also said that Sonia Blanchetti was the chairperson of ISU's technical panel when the backflip was banned in 1977 and that her son held the same position in 2024, when the ban was lifted.

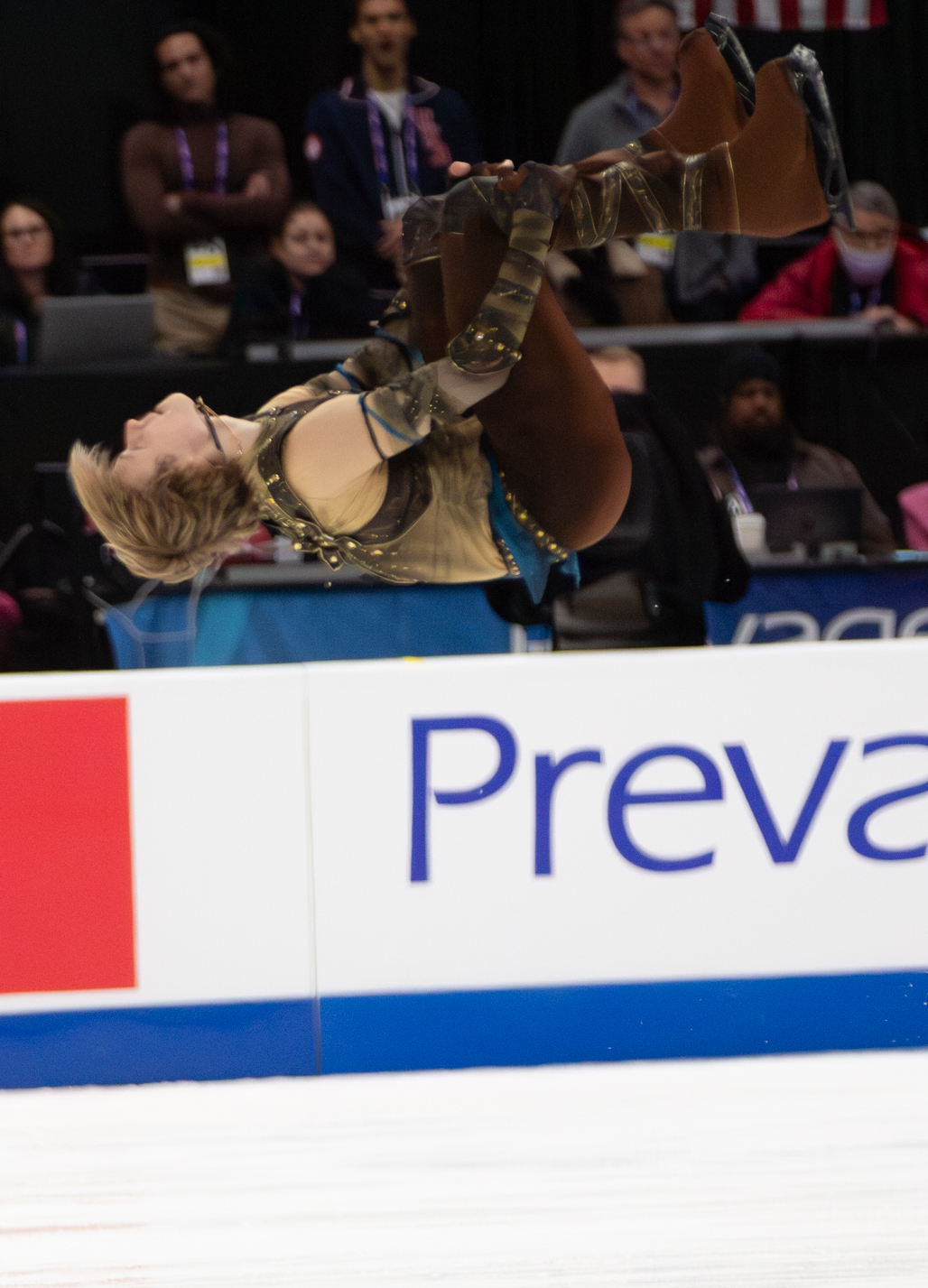
Ilia Malinin performing a backflip at the 2026 U.S. Championships

The backflip ban was lifted prior to the 2024–2025 season, when it and other "somersault type jumps" were removed from ISU's list of restricted moves and elements. The ISU's agenda for its congress in Las Vegas in June 2024 included a proposal to remove backflips from the restricted list, stating that the reason for doing so was that "somersault type jumps are very spectacular and nowadays it is not logical anymore to include them as illegal movements"; the proposal passed and the ban was removed from the sport's rules. The backflip is not assigned a point value and is not a required element, but it is allowed to be included as part of the choreographic sequence during the free skating program.

ABC News reported that backflips "almost immediately" began to appear in lower-level competitions, including at the Lombardia Trophy in September 2024, when Ilia Malinin from the U.S., who won the event, successfully executed it. The first time the move was allowed at the Grand Prix series was at the 2024 Skate America.

During the 2025–26 season, Deanna Stellato-Dudek and Maxime Deschamps of Canada became the first pair skating team to perform an assisted backflip in an ISU competition. Deschamps was opposed to incorporating it because he thought it was too dangerous, but was convinced by Stellato-Dudek. It was "a deliberate choice to shake up a somewhat monotonous element" during the footwork sequence of their short program and to "spice it up a little bit" during an Olympic year.

During the men's short program of the team event at the 2026 Winter Olympics, Malinin executed a backflip, marking the first time the element had been legally performed in the Olympics since 1976. He also became the first skater to legally land the move on one blade in Olympic history during the men's free skate of the same event.

== Execution and training ==
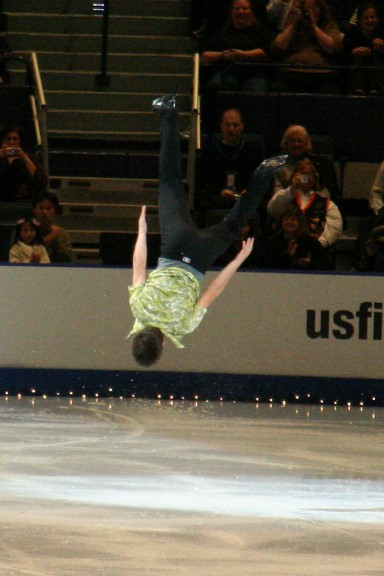
Ryan Bradley demonstrating the back flip, 2006

A skater enters into a backflip by skating backwards. Then they throw both their arms upwards to create momentum, dip their left knee to create power, kick their right leg backwards to execute the flip, and end it by landing on their left leg. This variation of the backflip is named after Bonaly. The backflip is also executed by landing on two feet, as Siao Him Fa did at the 2024 European Championships. Patrick Blackwell from the U.S., who competed as a junior in 2024, described completing the backflip as "just a pick and a look back".

Kubicka learned and trained for the backflip on the ice by using support ropes to help guide his landing. Siao Him Fa trained for the backflip wearing a helmet and a harness. Blackwell trained with a harness. Malinin was able to "seamlessly incorporate the backflip into his program" because he had been doing gymnastics off the ice for much of his life. He had been doing backflips off-ice for the previous four or five years before the ban was lifted, stating, "I was doing gymnastics and it started to become muscle memory". He worked on learning the backflip with his father and another coach at his home, using ropes around his waist for support, and later worked with former competitor Ryan Bradley from the U.S. and American professional skaters Scott Irvine and Jason Gratz, who taught him how to execute the move on the ice.

Skaters, including Kubicka, Bonaly, Siao Him Fa, and Bradley, who also performed backflips in ice shows for many years, acknowledged the risk associated with the move. Kubicka expressed hope that skaters have "the appropriate training prior to incorporating it onto the ice". Bonaly, who became a skating coach and was hospitalized after attempting a backflip with a twist on the ice, said in 2024 that she did not teach the move to her students. Malinin told NBC Sports that spectators at ice shows and competitions "really went wild over" the backflip and that it inserted a surprise into his programs. He also said that it "almost gives the same energy as if I were to do a quad jump".
