= Sollenberger (surname) =

Sollenberger is a German surname, meaning someone from Sollenberg, in Bayern, Germany. Notable people with the surname include:

- Eric Sollenberger (born 1985), also known as PFT Commenter, American podcaster on Pardon My Take
- John B. Sollenberger (1897–1967), American sports and entertainment executive who helped develop Hershey, Pennsylvania
- Paul Sollenberger (1891–1995), American astronomer and namesake of a minor planet
