= Peter A. Tyrrell =

American entrepreneur (1896-1973)

Peter A. Tyrrell (April 8, 1896 – May 8, 1973) was an entertainment entrepreneur in Philadelphia, most prominently associated with the Philadelphia Arena. He was one of eleven founders of what eventually became the National Basketball Association, and was a founder and the first president of the Ice Capades.

In 1919, he became a sports publicist and established a 3,000 seat boxing arena in West Manayunk (now known as Belmont Hills), due West from Philadelphia across the Schuylkill River in Lower Merion Township, Montgomery County, Pennsylvania. At the time, the city of Philadelphia limited boxing contests to six rounds; since his arena was outside the city, he could, and did, stage 15-round bouts there. In 1929 he became a boxing matchmaker with the Philadelphia Arena, which at that time was the city's largest public entertainment venue. He later became publicist for the Arena, then served as its general manager from 1934 to 1958. In 1958, he and some associates bought the Arena, and Tyrrell became president and general manager. He held those positions until 1965, at which time the Arena was sold.

At the Arena during the 1940s, Tyrrell organized what were considered to be the world's first televised ice show, boxing match, basketball game, and ice hockey game. During five weeks in 1949 he arranged and promoted a welterweight boxing championship match between Sugar Ray Robinson and Kid Gavilán.

During his time with the Arena, Tyrrell "significantly enriched the variety of public entertainment in Philadelphia and elsewhere." He was one of the first to book the Shipstad and Johnson ice show, the success of this endeavor leading to the establishment of the Ice Follies, one of the era's most successful entertainment shows. In 1940, he formed an association with ten Eastern sports arenas to finance the Ice Capades, a show formed along the lines of the Ice Follies. Tyrrell became manager and president of the group, and was actively involved in its rehearsals, travels, and performances. He was a director of the Ice Capades until 1963 when the company was sold. During these years he convinced ice skating champion Sonja Henie to "turn professional." She made her professional debut at the Arena.

Tyrrell was also involved in rodeos, bringing Gene Autry and his rodeo for the first time to Philadelphia. When Autry left the show, Tyrrell replaced him with Roy Rogers. Tyrrell was known for bringing a wide range of entertainments to the Arena. Events held during his time there included the Johnny Weissmuller and Buster Crabbe swimming shows, roller derbies, billiards contests, six-day bicycle races, dance marathons, rocking chair derbies, furniture sales, automobile shows, an endurance race between men and horses, and performances by the Spanish Riding School, the Moscow State Circus, the Scots Guards Band, Gracie Fields, Bob Hope, Nat King Cole, Victor Borge, Elvis Presley, and Marian Anderson.

In addition to his promotional activities, Tyrrell was one of the founders of the Basketball Association of America (BAA), a forerunner of today's National Basketball Association. He briefly managed the Philadelphia Warriors professional basketball team, which won the BAA championship in 1946–1947. He also brought the Philadelphia Ramblers ice hockey team to Philadelphia as a New York Rangers farm club.

Tyrrell received many awards from local groups for his charitable and fundraising activities. He won many trophies as an amateur golfer, and was considered to be an exceptional pocket billiards player, playing exhibitions with many world champions.
