= Terry Kubicka =

American retired figure skater (born 1956)

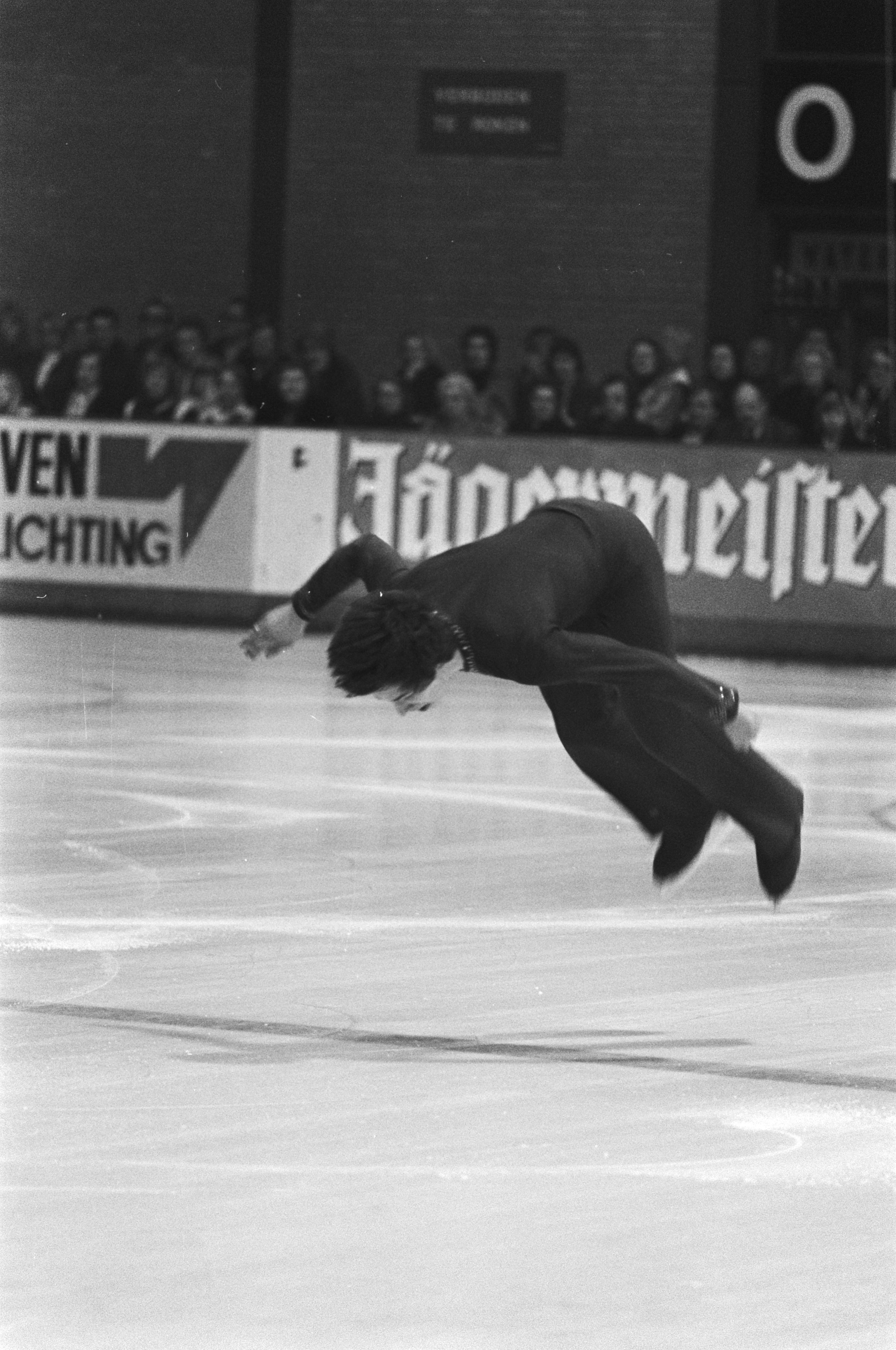
- Kubicka in 1976

Personal information
- Full name: Terry Paul Kubicka
- Born: April 3, 1956 (age 70) Long Beach, California, U.S.

Figure skating career
- Country: United States
- Discipline: Men's singles
- Skating club: Arctic Blades FSC

Terry Paul Kubicka (born April 3, 1956) is an American retired figure skater who is known as the first American to perform the difficult triple Lutz jump. He is the 1974 Prague Skate champion, 1975 Skate Canada International bronze medalist, and 1976 U.S. national champion. He competed at the 1976 Winter Olympics.

== Personal life ==
Terry Kubicka was born on April 3, 1956, in Long Beach, California. He received a Bachelor of Science degree from California Polytechnic State University and a Doctorate of Veterinary Medicine from University of California, Davis. In September 1982, he married his wife, Annie, with whom he has three children – Katie, Christopher, and Scott. He is currently the medical director at Four Corners Veterinary Hospital, Concord, California

== Skating career ==
Kubicka decided to begin skating after his parents took him to the Ice Follies show. Evy Scotvold coached him for nine years, from group to private lessons.

Kubicka won silver at the 1972 Grand Prix International St. Gervais, gold at the 1974 Prague Skate, and bronze at the 1975 Skate Canada International. At the 1974 U.S. Championships, he became the first American to land the triple Lutz jump in competition. He landed three triple jumps in his long program and in the process won second place and a spot at the World Championships. Kubicka said that he had landed it in the short program but it was not filmed so he did it again in the long. Next year, he won silver at the U.S. Championships and competed at the World Championships again.

In 1976, he won the U.S. national title, landing five triple jumps in the long program and landing his first back flip. He was named to the American team for the 1976 Winter Olympics in Innsbruck, Austria, where he became the first skater to perform a legal backflip in competition (and until 1998 the only one). The backflip was banned after the competition. To the present time, this move is his most important claim to ice skating fame. Less remembered is his ability to land five of the six triple jumps (except the Axel). In comparison, the gold medalist (John Curry) landed only three triple jumps in winning his Olympic gold medal. Indeed, it would not be until 1983 that any skater would land all six different kinds of triple jumps in competition. Brian Boitano accomplished that feat at the World Championships.

After ending his competitive career, Kubicka toured with Ice Capades for three years then left skating to become a veterinarian. In 2005, he returned to skating as a National Technical Specialist. He was named an International Technical Specialist as of August 1, 2007.

== Results ==
Event	71–72	72–73	73–74	74–75	75–76
Winter Olympics					7th
World Championships			12th	7th	6th
Nebelhorn Trophy		2nd			
Skate Canada					3rd
St. Gervais		2nd			
Prague Skate				1st	
U.S. Championships	1st J	4th	2nd	2nd	1st
