= Adam Siao Him Fa =

French figure skater (born 2001)

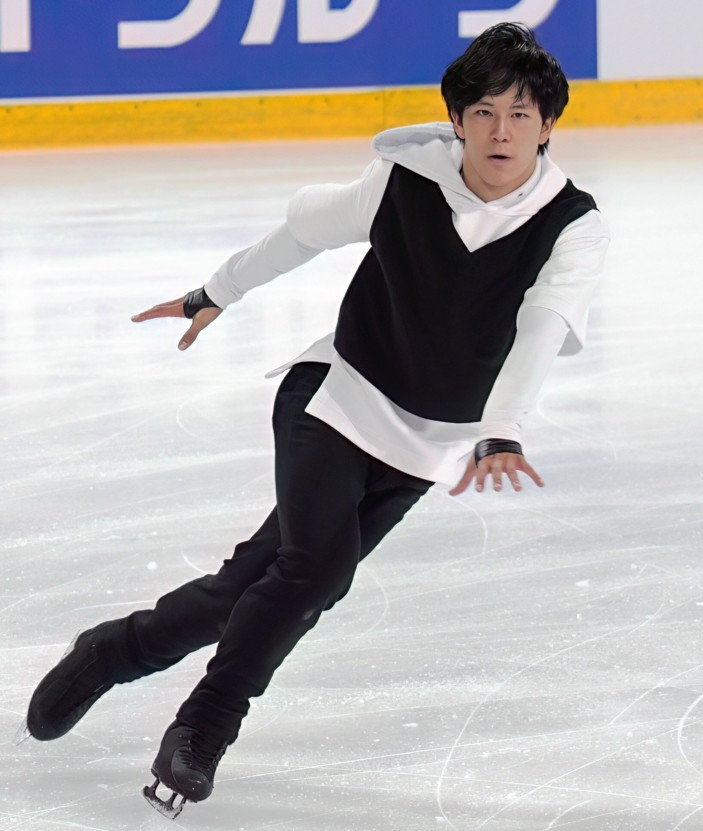
- Siao Him Fa at the 2024 Grand Prix de France

Personal information
- Born: 31 January 2001 (age 25) Bordeaux, France
- Home town: Nice, France
- Height: 1.67 m (5 ft 6 in)

Figure skating career
- Country: France
- Discipline: Men's singles
- Coach: Cédric Tour; Benoît Richaud
- Skating club: Nice Baie des Anges
- Began skating: 2006
- Highest WS: 3rd

Medal record
| Event | Gold medal – first place | Silver medal – second place | Bronze medal – third place |
| World Championships | 0 | 0 | 1 |
| European Championships | 2 | 0 | 1 |
| French Championships | 2 | 5 | 0 |
Medal list
World Championships
| Bronze medal – third place | 2024 Montreal | Singles |
European Championships
| Gold medal – first place | 2023 Espoo | Singles |
| Gold medal – first place | 2024 Kaunas | Singles |
| Bronze medal – third place | 2025 Tallinn | Singles |
French Championships
| Gold medal – first place | 2023 Rouen | Singles |
| Gold medal – first place | 2024 Vaujany | Singles |
| Silver medal – second place | 2019 Vaujany | Singles |
| Silver medal – second place | 2020 Dunkirk | Singles |
| Silver medal – second place | 2021 Vaujany | Singles |
| Silver medal – second place | 2022 Cergy-Pontoise | Singles |
| Silver medal – second place | 2026 Briançon | Singles |

Adam Siao Him Fa (French: [adɑ̃ sjaw⟮o⟯-im-fa]; born 31 January 2001) is a French figure skater. He is the 2024 World bronze medalist, a two-time European champion (2023, 2024), an eight-time Grand Prix medalist (5 gold, 2 silver, 1 bronze), a six-time ISU Challenger Series medalist (3 gold, 2 silver, 1 bronze), and a two-time French national champion (2023-24).

At the junior level, he is a two-time Junior Grand Prix medalist (1 gold, 1 silver) and finished within the top six at the 2019 World Junior Championships.

Siao Him Fa represented France at the 2022 and 2026 Winter Olympics.

== Personal life ==
Siao Him Fa was born on 31 January 2001 in Bordeaux, France. He is the youngest of four children. His parents, Daniel and Patricia, are originally from Mauritius and moved to France in the early 1980s. His paternal grandparents are of Chinese origin while his maternal ones are from Mauritius as well. He formerly attended Collège Hubertine Auclert in Toulouse.

== Career ==
=== Early career ===
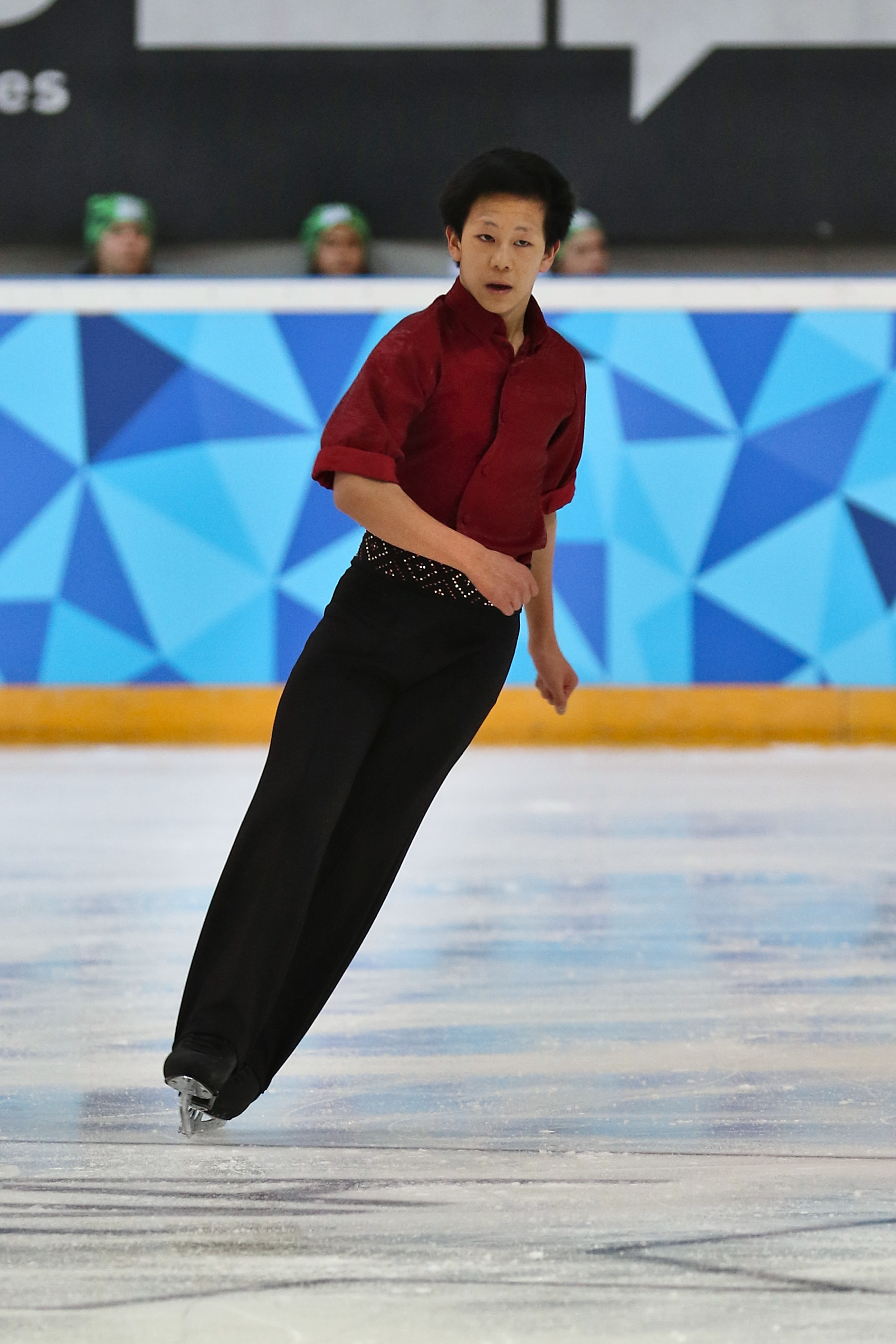
Siao Him Fa at the 2016 Winter Youth Olympics

Siao Him Fa began learning to skate in 2005 or 2006 in Bordeaux. As a child, he trained under Valerie Sou, Cornelia Paquier, Nathalie Depouilly, and Laurent Depouilly. He started training in Toulouse in 2011 because Bordeaux's ice rink was not operational. He debuted on the advanced novice level in March 2013 and won the French novice men's title in March 2014.

Coached by Rodolphe Maréchal and Baptiste Porquet in Toulouse, Siao Him Fa began appearing on the junior international level in October 2015. In February, he competed at the 2016 Winter Youth Olympics, placing tenth in Hamar, Norway. His ISU Junior Grand Prix (JGP) debut came in August 2016. He finished out of the top ten at both of his JGP assignments that season.

=== 2017–2018 season ===
In September 2017, Siao Him Fa began training under Brian Joubert at the 2007 World champion's skating club in Poitiers. He finished ninth at both of his JGP assignments. After placing fourth on the senior level at the French Championships in December 2017, he took silver at the junior event in February 2018. In March, he qualified for the final segment at the 2018 World Junior Championships; he ranked sixteenth in the short program, nineteenth in the free skate, and seventeenth overall at the event in Sofia, Bulgaria.

=== 2018–2019 season: Senior international debut ===
Competing in the 2018 JGP series, Siao Him Fa took bronze in Richmond, Canada, and then gold in Yerevan, Armenia. With these results, he qualified to the JGP Final in Vancouver, Canada. Between the two events, he won the gold medal on the junior level at the 2018 Master's de Patinage.

At the Junior Grand Prix Final, he finished fourth, setting new personal bests in the free skate and total score. He went on to win the silver medal at the 2019 2018 French Championships on the senior level.

Competing at his first European Championships, Siao Him Fa finished in twelfth place, setting three new personal bests in the process. At the 2019 World Junior Championships, he placed eighth in the short program with a clean skate, and another new personal best.

=== 2019–2020 season ===
Dogged by injury in the fall, Siao Him Fa did not repeat his earlier success on the Junior Grand Prix, finishing off the podium at both of his events. In October, he stood on his first ISU Challenger Series podium, taking bronze at the 2019 CS Ice Star. He repeated as French national silver medalist and national junior champion.

In January, Siao Him Fa competed at the 2020 European Championships in Graz, Austria. He was on the verge of not qualifying to the free skate after a poor performance in the short program, but unexpectedly made it in as the twenty-fourth and last to qualify after fellow Frenchman Kévin Aymoz failed to qualify despite previously being considered a favorite for the European men's title. He performed much better in the free skate, landing three quadruple jumps to place sixth in the segment and rising to eleventh place overall. He concluded his season with a seventh-place result at the 2020 World Junior Championships in Tallinn, Estonia.

Siao Him Fa announced a coaching change on 28 May 2020, deciding to join Laurent Depouilly in Courbevoie.

=== 2020–2021 season ===
With the COVID-19 pandemic affecting international travel, the ISU opted to assign the Grand Prix based largely on geographic location. Siao Him Fa was scheduled to make his Grand Prix debut at the 2020 Internationaux de France, but the event was cancelled. In February, Siao Him Fa won his third straight National silver medal.

Siao Him Fa finished the season as part of Team France at the 2021 World Team Trophy. He placed eighth in the short program and ninth in the free skate, while the French team finished in fifth place overall.

=== 2021–2022 season: Beijing Olympics and World Championship debut ===
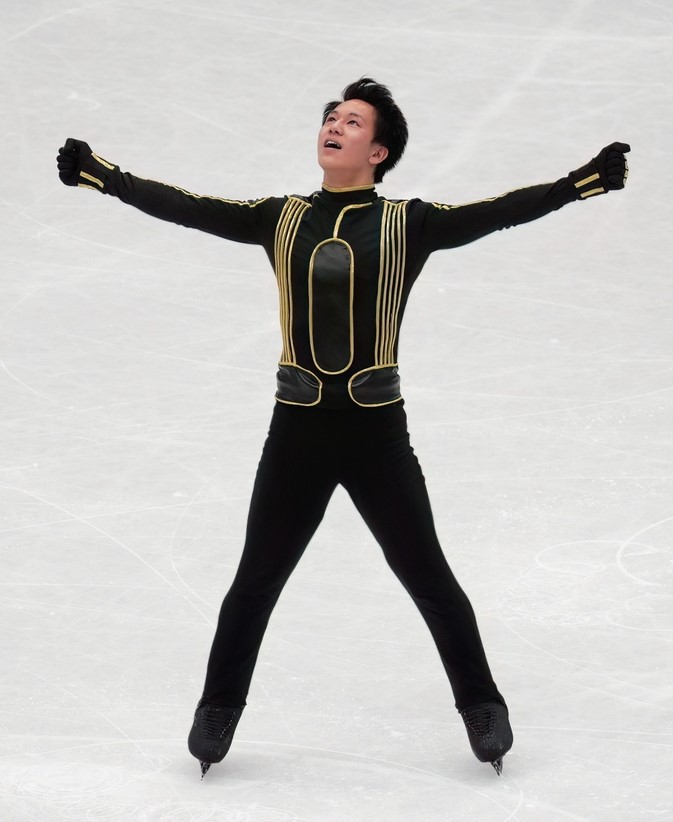
Siao Him Fa at the 2022 World Championships

Siao Him Fa began the Olympic season competing at the 2021 CS Lombardia Trophy, where he won the silver medal and set three new personal bests. He was then assigned to the 2021 CS Nebelhorn Trophy, winning the silver medal and qualifying a second berth for French men at the 2022 Winter Olympics. He went on to win gold at the 2021 Master's de Patinage.

Making his senior Grand Prix debut at 2021 Skate America, Siao Him Fa finished the event in ninth place. He was eighth at the 2021 Internationaux de France, setting a new personal best in the free skate.

After winning the silver medal at the French championships, Siao Him Fa was named to the French Olympic team. He placed fourteenth in the short program of the Olympic men's event. He was thirteenth in the free skate but remained in fourteenth overall.

Siao Him Fa concluded his season at the 2022 World Championships, held in Montpellier, France. He finished tenth in the short program with a new personal best, and rose to eighth overall with a sixth-place free skate, both scores also new personal bests.

=== 2022–2023 season: Grand Prix gold medal, French national title, and European title ===
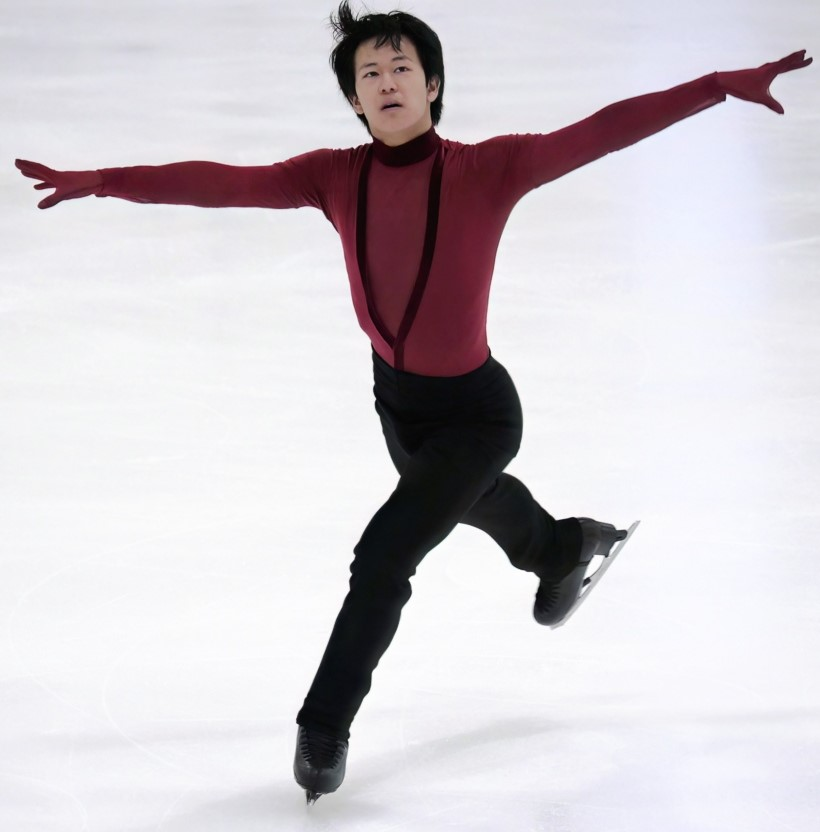
Siao Him Fa at the 2022 CS Lombardia Trophy

Siao Him Fa began the season with his first ever Challenger gold medal at the 2022 CS Lombardia Trophy. He then took gold at the 2022 Master's de Patinage and at the Cup of Nice. On the Grand Prix, he was third in the short program at the 2022 Grand Prix de France, but won the free skate to take the gold medal. This was the first Grand Prix win for a Frenchman since his former coach Brian Joubert won the NHK Trophy in 2009, a fact of which he was "very proud." He finished third in the short program at the 2022 NHK Trophy, his second event. He said “things didn't go as I planned, but I am positive about tomorrow and will continue to work this way." He finished fourth in the free skate but came fifth overall.

Disappointed not to have qualified for the Grand Prix Final, Siao Him Fa went on to win his first French national title at the championships in Rouen, beating defending champion Kévin Aymoz by a margin of over twenty points. Siao Him Fa continued his streak of success into the new year, finishing in first place in the short program at the 2023 European Championships with a new personal best of 96.53. He was "happy" to have finally skated cleanly in the short program internationally that season. He finished second in the free skate, but won the gold medal. This was the first European title for a Frenchman in twelve years since Florent Amodio's victory in 2011.

Siao Him Fa struggled with his jumps in the 2023 World Championships short program, coming in twelfth. He admitted "it's frustrating today, but it's not over yet." He rose to tenth after the free skate. Siao Him Fa then joined Team France at the 2023 World Team Trophy, where he was fifth in the short program and tenth in the free skate. Team France finished fifth overall.

=== 2023–2024 season: Grand Prix Final debut, European gold, and World medal ===
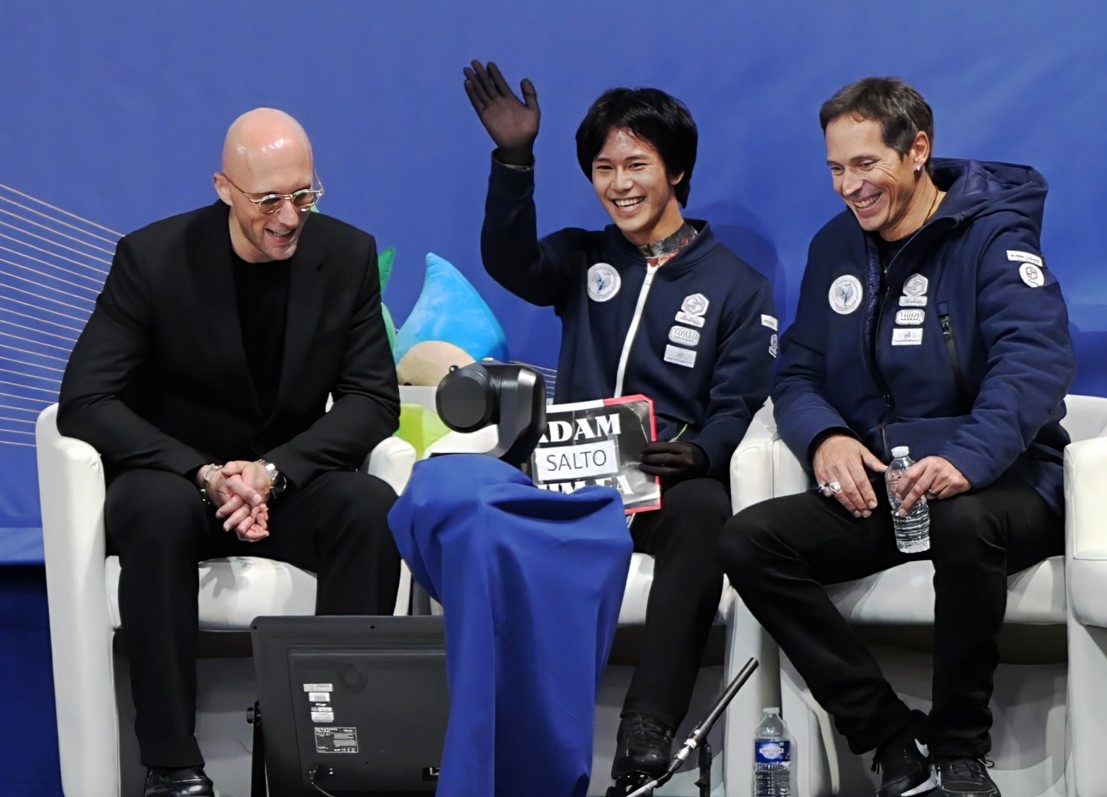
Siao Him Fa (center) with coaches, Benoît Richaud(left) and Rodolphe Maréchal (right) at the 2023 Grand Prix de France

Siao Him Fa began the season at the 2023 CS Nebelhorn Trophy, where he won the gold medal. He next appeared at the 2023 Master's de Patinage and at the 2023 Shanghai Trophy, winning those events as well. He started the Grand Prix at the 2023 Grand Prix de France in Angers, where he won his second consecutive event title ahead of Ilia Malinin of the United States and Yuma Kagiyama of Japan. “It shows I have my place with the greatest skaters," he said after the free skate. Siao Him Fa crossed the 100-, 200- and 300-point barriers in the short program, free skate and total score with three new personal best scores of 101.07, 205.71 and 306.78 respectively. He is the sixth man to achieve a total over 300 points under the current ISU judging system. Siao Him Fa traveled immediately to Chongqing for the 2023 Cup of China the following weekend, where he placed second in the short program behind reigning World champion Shoma Uno after falling on his quad toe loop attempt. He overtook Uno in the free skate, rising to the gold medal position. He said he was "satisfied" with the result given that he was competing back-to-back and dealt with an equipment problem in practice.

Qualifying to the 2023–24 Grand Prix Final, Siao Him Fa doubled his planned quad Lutz in the short program, finishing sixth of six skaters in that segment and more than fifteen points back of third place. In the free skate he made two minor quad jump errors, and had a technical fall after losing his balance in his choreographic sequence, placing third in that segment and rising to fourth place overall. He was 10.37 points behind bronze medalist Kagiyama. Speaking afterward he acknowledged that coming into the event as one of the podium favourites had been a new challenge for him. Siao Him Fa then returned to France for the national championships in Vaujany the following weekend, where he decisively won his second French championship.

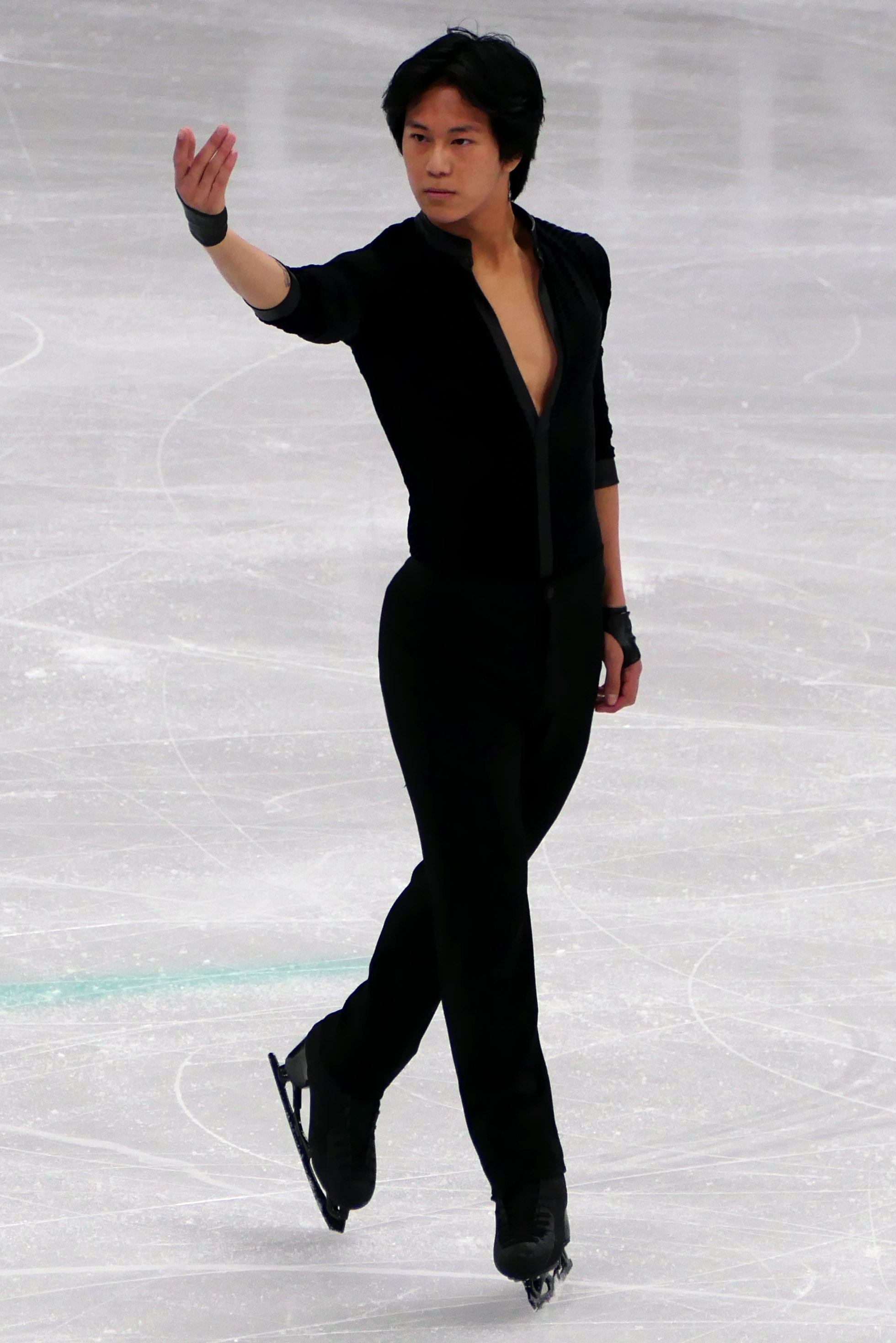
Siao Him Fa during his short program at the 2024 World Championships

Siao Him Fa entered the 2024 European Championships in Kaunas as the favourite for the gold medal, and he won the short program despite putting a hand down on his quad Lutz and performing only a quad-double combination instead of a quad-triple. He made errors in the free skate, but he won that segment as well and comfortably retained his European title by a margin of almost twenty points overall. He attracted notice for performing an illegal on-ice backflip at the end of his program, drawing comparisons to fellow French skater Surya Bonaly. Siao Him Fa called it "a little French touch." The following month, his free program was named Best Program at the 2024 ISU Skating Awards.

In March, he entered the 2024 World Championships in Montreal as a perceived podium contender. However, he encountered difficulties in the short program, struggling on the landings of all three of his jumping passes and failing to execute a jump combination. He scored only 77.49 points in the segment, coming nineteenth. As a result, he skated in the first of four flights in the free skate, but he executed a clean program to come second in the free skate with a score of 206.90, despite incurring a two-point deduction for performing a backflip at the end. He finished third overall, winning the bronze medal over fourth-place Uno by 3.54 points. This was the first World medal for a Frenchman since Brian Joubert's bronze medal in 2010. Siao Him Fa called it "the best performance of my life."

=== 2024–2025 season: European Bronze ===
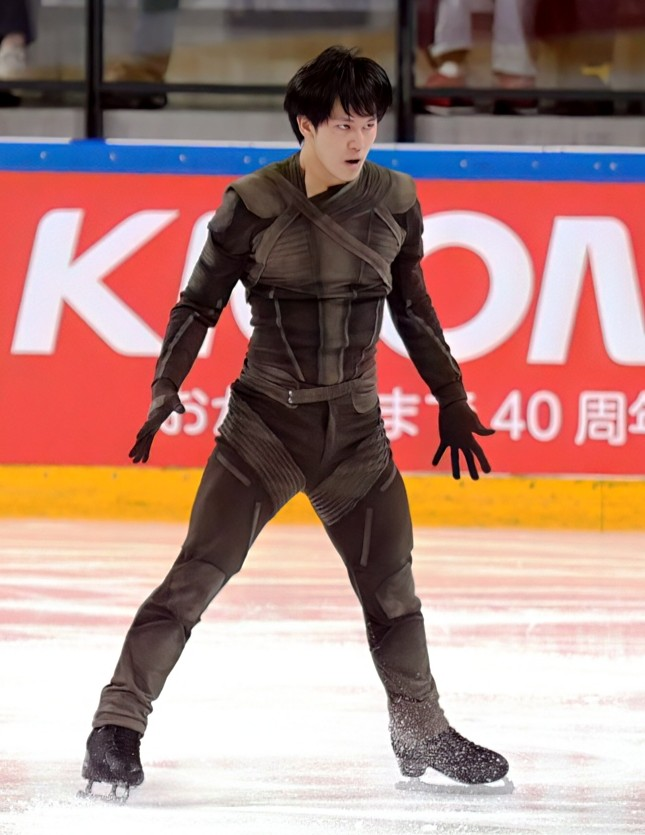
Siao Him Fa during the free skate at the 2024 Grand Prix de France

During the off-season, Siao Him Fa's coach and choreographer, Benoît Richaud, made the decision to create two completely different short programs for Siao Him Fa to skate to during the season. One program was choreographed to the ballad SOS d'un terrien en détresse from the musical Starmania, while the other one was set to a mashup of hip hop songs, "Gangsta's Paradise" and "X Gon' Give It to Ya." Richaud stated that this was deliberately done so that Siao Him Fa would have a wide selection of different short program vehicles to use. Siao Him Fa also said that having two short programs added interest and made his training less repetitive.

In late September, Siao Him Fa announced that he and his team decided that he would postpone competing until the 2024 Grand Prix de France due to an ankle injury sustained before the start of the season. Despite these comments, Siao Him Fa competed two weeks prior the Grand Prix de France at the 2024 CS Trophée Métropole Nice Côte d'Azur, where he won the gold medal.

At the Grand Prix de France, Siao Him Fa placed eighth in the short program after falling two times, but went on to win the free skate, winning the event overall for a third consecutive time. After the event, he said that there were "plenty of positives" about the competition despite the lack of time he had to prepare for it and having issues with broken boots and that he was planning adjustments to his programs. He also stated that he no longer suffered from ankle pain.

Three weeks later, Siao Him Fa competed at the 2024 Cup of China, where he placed third in the short program after falling on an attempted quadruple toe loop. He also placed third in the free skate, winning the bronze medal overall. Following the event, Siao Him Fa revealed that he had re-injured his ankle during the free skate.

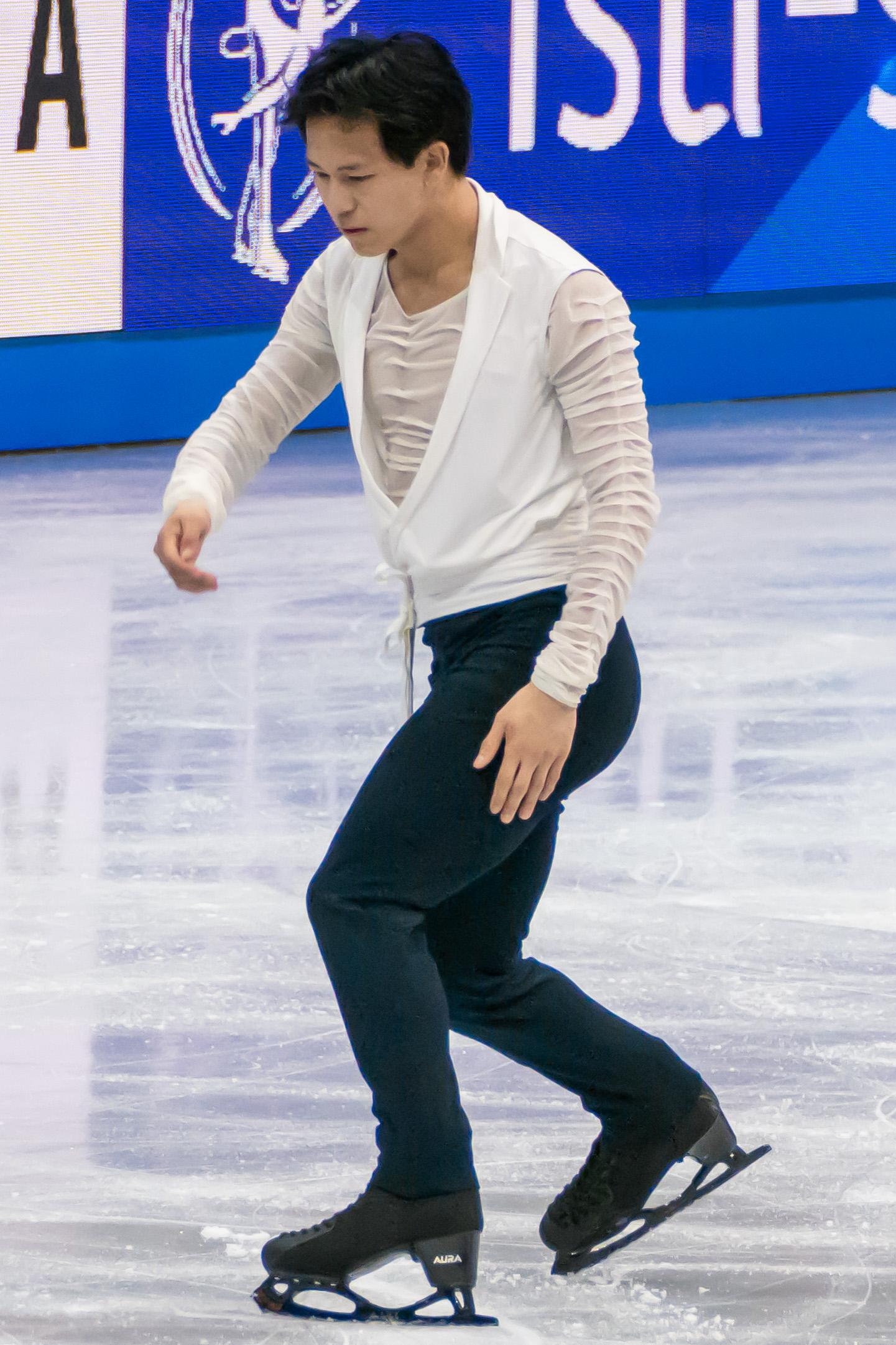
Siao Him Fa during the short program at the World Figure Skating Championships

Siao Him Fa's results on the Grand Prix series qualified him for the 2024–25 Grand Prix Final; however, because of his ankle injury, he withdrew from the event. Although Siao Him Fa would also not compete at the French Championships, he was named to France's 2025 European Championships team.

At the European Championships, he finished in first after the short program, where he competed his S.O.S. d'un terrien en détresse program and landed a quad toe-triple toe combination and a quad Salchow, which he stepped out of. The men's short program was competed the day after a mid-air plane collision occurred in the United States; many of those on board were developmental figure skaters, their parents, and their coaches. Siao Him Fa dedicated his short program to those who died in the crash, saying, "The competition itself is no longer important compared to the message that I wanted to convey with the programme." In the free skate, he fell on his opening jump and struggled with many of his other jumps, and he fell to third place overall to win the bronze medal.

In early March, Siao Him Fa competed at the 2025 Sonja Henje Trophy, where he won the gold medal. Later in March, he competed at the World Figure Skating Championships, held in Boston. In the short program, he placed ninth. Afterward, he expressed disappointment: "I felt physically ready, so this was not what I was expecting." In his free skate, he put a hand down on his opening jump, a quad Lutz, and fell on another jumping pass; one of his boots also broke and lost support mid-program. However, he landed three further quad jumps, and he finished third in the free skate. His performance moved him up to fourth place overall, just ahead of compatriot Kévin Aymoz. Siao Him Fa and Aymoz's placements earned France three berths for French men's singles skating at the 2026 Winter Olympics.

While at the World Championships, Siao Him Fa sustained a hip injury and an MRI showed a psoas tear and a bone bruise on the femur. He also twisted his right ankle while performing with Holiday on Ice. Despite these injuries, he elected to compete for Team France at the 2025 World Team Trophy. Siao Him Fa finished third in the individual event and Team France placed fourth overall. “It was really tough, mentally and physically, but it was also fun, and it was a good practice for next season," said Siao Him Fa. "The quad flip was for next season, to try a five-quad program. I know I can do it when I'm in a better physical condition."

=== 2025–2026 season: Milano Cortina Olympics ===
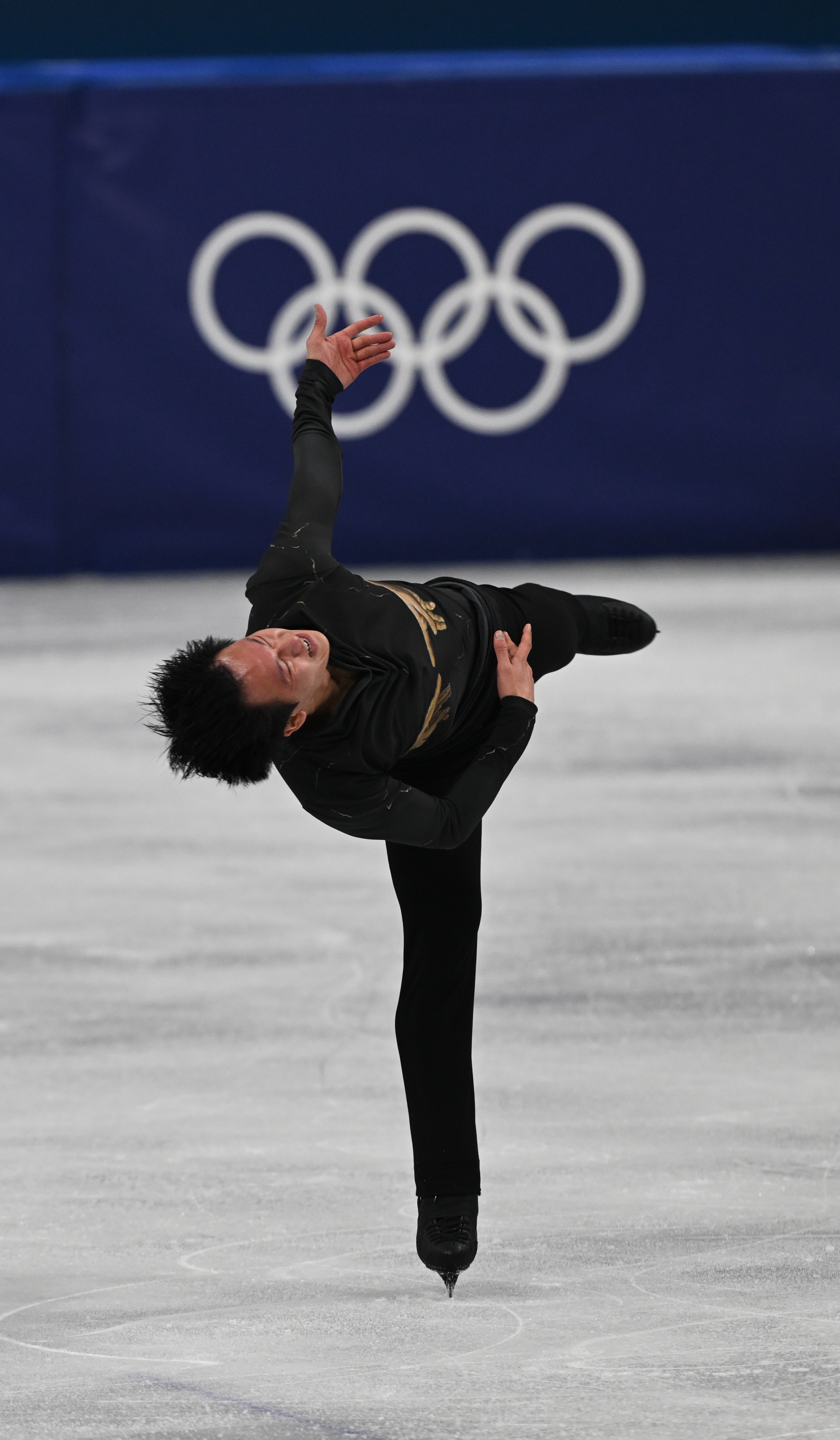
Siao Him Fa performing a camel spin during his free skate at the 2026 Winter Olympics

Siao Him Fa opened his season in August with a third-place finish at 2025 Master's de Patinage. The following month he competed 2025 Lombardia Trophy, placing fifth. The skater then won the gold medal at 2025 Trophée Métropole Nice Côte d'Azur the first week October. He went on to win the silver medal at 2025 Grand Prix de France. "I didn't care about results, points, anything," he said after the free skate. "I was just enjoying the moment."

The following month, Siao Him Fa placed second behind Yuma Kagiyama at 2025 Finlandia Trophy, qualifying for the 2025–26 Grand Prix Final. "I did what I could do," he said after the free skate. "I fought until the end. I felt very nervous today, and I felt kind of lost in the warm-up. But I fought for every element."

In December, Siao Him Fa placed fifth at the 2025–26 Grand Prix Final. He said after the free skate, "I know that I could do better. I’m nervous, but I was feeling great and it was really amazing to skate that."

After placing second at the French Championships, he was not entered for the 2026 European Championships. The French federation advised Siao Him Fa that they thought having him compete at the European Championships would affect his preparation for the 2026 Winter Olympics given that he was still coming back from his injuries, and Siao Him Fa and his coach agreed.

On 10 February, Siao Him Fa competed in the short program segment of the 2026 Winter Olympics. He placed third in that segment following a clean skate. "I'm feeling very happy about the performance," he said following the short program. "It was really the performance I had imagined to do, the performance I worked for and prepared for. I'm very happy that I could do what I wanted to. Everything went as planned, so I'm very happy about it." Two days later, however, Siao Him Fa placed only twelfth in the free skate segment following an error-ridden performance and dropped to seventh place overall. "I’m very disappointed about what I did," he said after the free skate. "So far, it wasn’t what I wanted and what I worked for. It’s very hard to accept it. It’s still new. It’s a huge disappointment and I’m very sad about what I did."

In March, Siao Him Fa competed at the 2026 World Championships in Prague, Czech Republic. He placed second in the short program with a score of 101.85 points, but placed eight in the free skate due to underrotating and falling on his opening quadruple Lutz and stepping out of a triple Axel-double Axel sequence, as well as a solo triple Axel, dropping to fifth overall. "I’m disappointed," he said following his free skate. "Once again, I messed up the Free Skate, the Lutz. It’s more of a mental thing."

=== 2026–2027 season ===
Siao Him Fa begun his season by placing fifth at the 2026 CS Nepela Memorial.

In October, Siao Him Fa competed at the 2026 Grand Prix de France where he placed first and won the gold medal. "I'm a little tired, but I'm extremely happy to have given everything throughout this competition. It's a good start to the season, and it feels great to be back skating here in Angers" he shared.

The following month, Siao Him Fa competed at 2026 Finlandia Trophy where he placed 12th in the short program, second in the free skate, and fourth overall. He revealed that he had been unable to skate for 10 days due to an ankle injury coming into the event.

== Programs ==
| Season | Short program | Free skating | Exhibition |
|---|---|---|---|
| 2026–2027 | Take Five by Paul Desmond performed by the Dave Brubeck Quartet choreo. by Benoît Richaud | Here Comes the River by Patrick Watson choreo. by Benoît Richaud | WHERE IS MY HUSBAND! by RAYE |
| 2025–2026 | Leonardo da Vinci; La terre vue du ciel by Armand Amar arranged by Cédric Tour choreo. by Benoît Richaud | The Creation of Adam; Tirol Concerto for Piano and Orchestra by Philip Glass performed by Dennis Russell Davies & Stuttgart Chamber Orchestra arranged by Cédric Tour choreo. by Benoît Richaud | NUEVAYoL by Bad Bunny; Senses; Story of a March Day by Cédric Tour choreo. by Benoît Richaud; Cygne by Loïc Nottet choreo. by Benoît Richaud |
| 2024–2025 | Gangsta's Paradise by Coolio performed by 2WEI; X Gon' Give It to Ya by DMX choreo. by Benoît Richaud; S.O.S. d'un terrien en détresse (from Starmania) by Michel Berger & Luc Plamondon performed by Grégory Lemarchal arranged by Cédric Tour choreo. by Benoît Richaud | Paul's Dream; The Shortening of the Way; A Time of Quiet Between the Storms (from Dune) by Hans Zimmer; Fallout (from Arcane) by Alexander Temple & Ray Chen choreo. by Benoît Richaud | Raincatchers by Birdy; Senses; Story of a March Day by Cédric Tour choreo. by Benoît Richaud |
| 2023–2024 | The Prophet by Gary Moore choreo. by Benoît Richaud | Departure (Home); The Quality of Mercy (from The Leftovers) by Max Richter; Mercy (Voiceless Mix) by Max Richter and Mari Samuelsen; Refuge by Power-Haus and Ros Stephen choreo. by Benoît Richaud | Uptown Funk by Mark Ronson ft. Bruno Mars; Within; Television Rules The Nation; Harder, Better, Faster, Stronger by Daft Punk arranged by Cedric Tour choreo. by Benoît Richaud; Star Wars by John Williams arranged by Maxime Rodriguez choreo. by Benoît Richaud |
| 2022–2023 | Rain, In Your Black Eyes by Ezio Bosso choreo. by Benoît Richaud | Horizons by Cedric Tour; Horizons Into Battlegrounds; Minus Sixty One; Run Boy Run by Woodkid choreo. by Benoît Richaud | Star Wars by John Williams arranged by Maxime Rodriguez choreo. by Benoît Richaud; Mi Gente by J Balvin and Willy William |
| 2021–2022 | Star Wars by John Williams arranged by Maxime Rodriguez choreo. by Benoît Richaud | Within; Television Rules The Nation; Harder, Better, Faster, Stronger by Daft Punk arranged by Cedric Tour choreo. by Benoît Richaud | Leave a Light On by Tom Walker arranged by Maxime Rodriguez choreo. by Benoît Richaud |
| 2020–2021 | Star Wars by John Williams arranged by Maxime Rodriguez choreo. by Benoît Richaud | Leave a Light On by Tom Walker arranged by Maxime Rodriguez choreo. by Benoît Richaud | |
| 2019–2020 | Never Tear Us Apart by INXS performed by Joe Cocker choreo. by Laurie May, Fabian Bourzat; Dust and Light by David Travis Edwards performed by Twelve Titans; Lords of Lankhmar by Paul Dinletir performed by Audiomachine choreo. by Laurie May, Fabian Bourzat | The Golden Age by Woodkid choreo. by Laurie May, Fabian Bourzat | |
| 2018–2019 | Archangel performed by Two Steps from Hell; Flying performed by Dan and Deryn Cullen; Star Sky performed by Two Steps from Hell choreo. by Nikolai Morozov | Weight of Love performed by The Black Keys choreo. by Nikolai Morozov | |
| 2017–2018 | Way Down We Go by Kaleo choreo. by Brian Joubert, Cornelia Paquier | Iron Sky performed by Paolo Nutini choreo. by Laurie May | |
| 2016–2017 | Heartbreak Hotel; Blue Suede Shoes performed by Elvis Presley choreo. by Iwona Filipowicz | Exogenesis: Symphony Part II by Muse choreo. by Iwona Filipowicz | |
| 2015–2016 | Take Five by Paul Desmond; The Mojo Radio Band by Parov Stelar choreo. by Iwona Filipowicz | Exogenesis: Symphony Part II by Muse choreo. by Iwona Filipowicz | |

== Competitive highlights ==
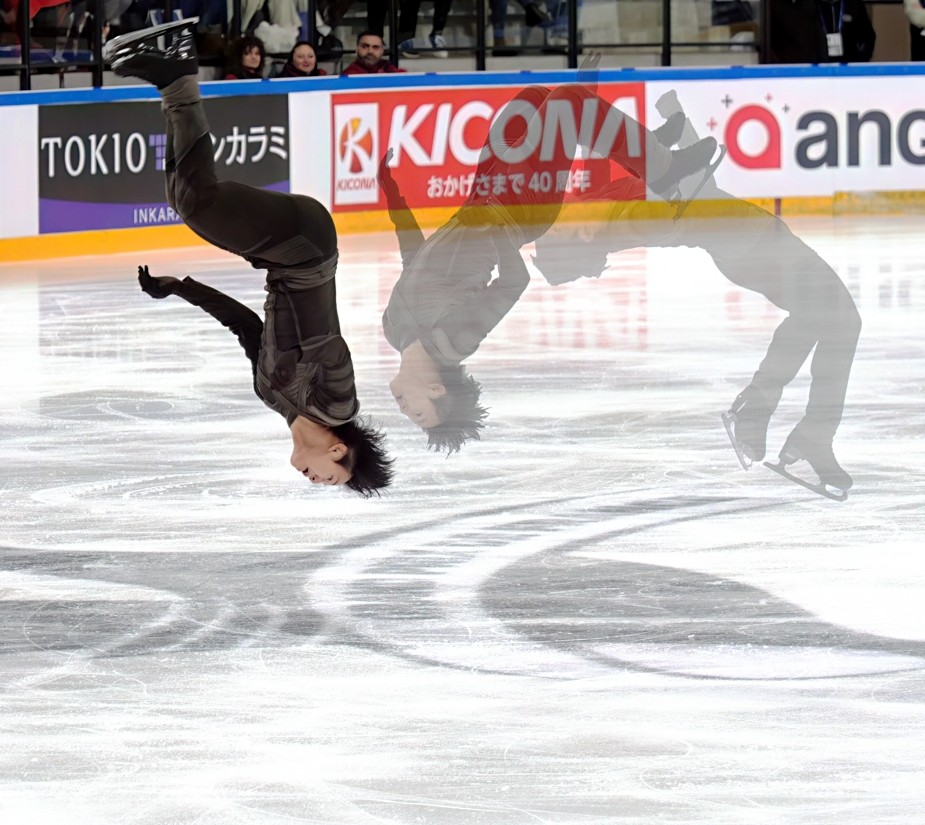
Siao Him Fa performing his signature backflip at the 2024 Grand Prix de France

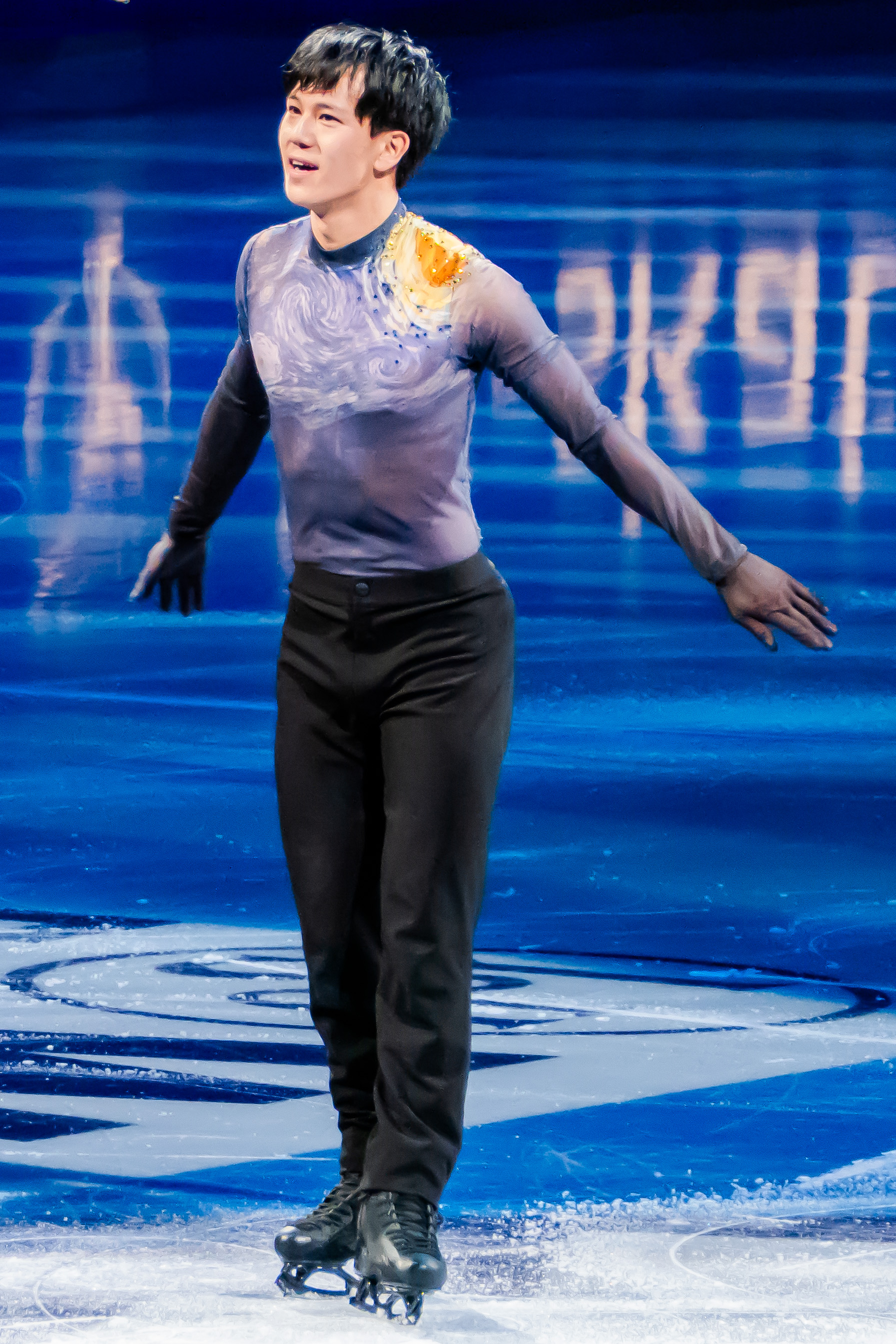
Siao Him Fa performing in the gala at the 2025 World Championships

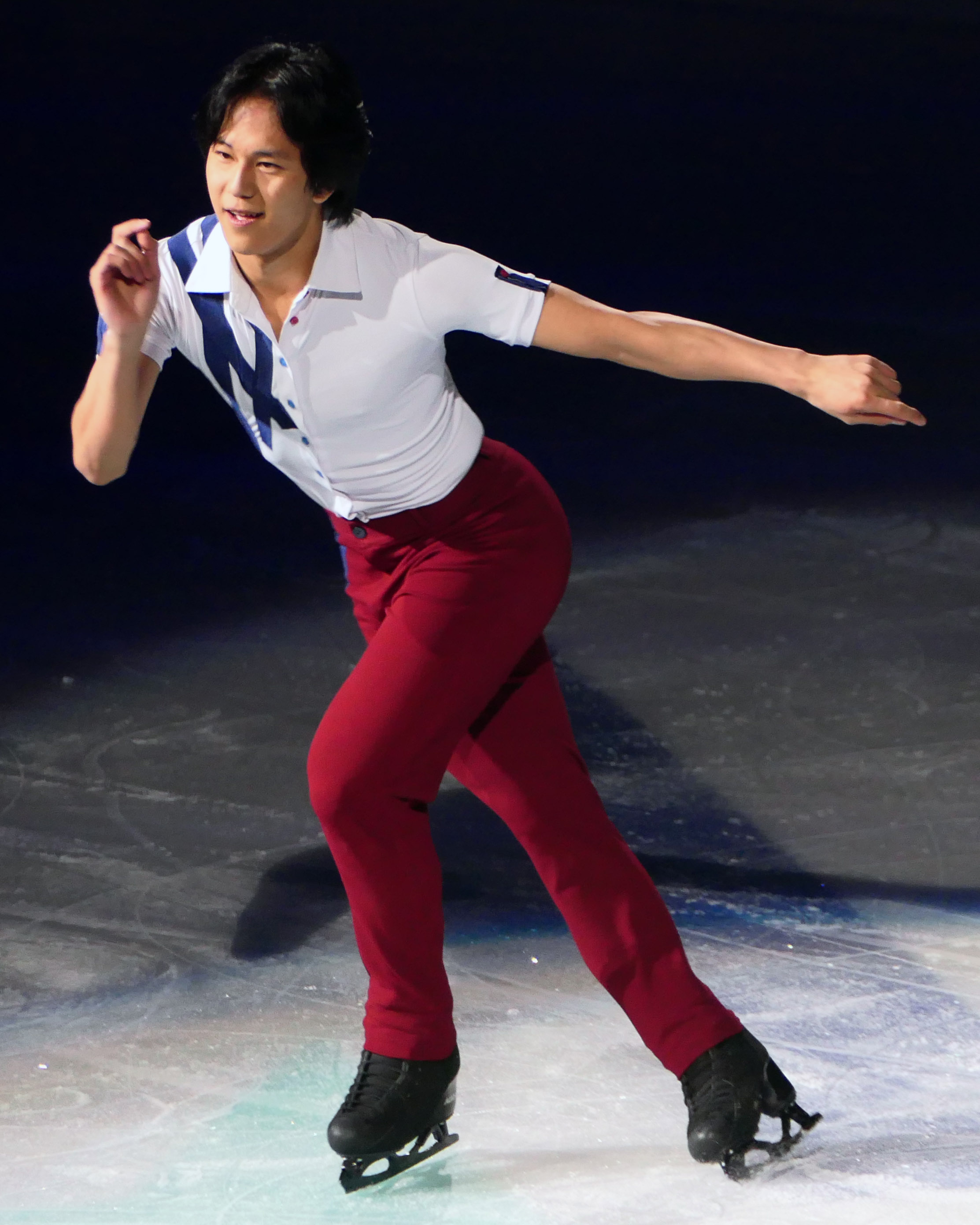
Siao Him Fa during the gala at the 2024 World Championships

- GP – Event of the ISU Grand Prix Series
- JGP – Event of the ISU Junior Grand Prix Series
- CS – Event of the ISU Challenger Series
- C – Event was cancelled
- TBD – Assigned
- WD – Withdrew from competition
- Medals at team events are awarded for the team results only. Individual placements at team events are listed in parentheses.

Competition placements at senior level
| Season | 2018–19 | 2019–20 | 2020–21 | 2021–22 | 2022–23 | 2023–24 | 2024–25 | 2025–26 | 2026–27 |
|---|---|---|---|---|---|---|---|---|---|
| Winter Olympics | | | | 14th | | | | 7th | |
| World Championships | | | | 8th | 10th | 3rd | 4th | 5th | |
| European Championships | 12th | 11th | | | 1st | 1st | 3rd | | |
| Grand Prix Final | | | | | | 4th | WD | 5th | |
| French Championships | 2nd | 2nd | 2nd | 2nd | 1st | 1st | | 2nd | |
| World Team Trophy | 4th (12th) | | 5th (8th) | | 5th (9th) | | 4th (3rd) | | |
| GP Cup of China | | | | | | 1st | 3rd | | |
| GP France | | | C | 8th | 1st | 1st | 1st | 2nd | 1st |
| GP Finland | | | | | | | | 2nd | 4th |
| GP NHK Trophy | | | | | 5th | | | | |
| GP Skate America | | | | 9th | | | | | |
| CS Alpen Trophy | 7th | | | | | | | | |
| CS Golden Spin of Zagreb | | 7th | | | | | | | |
| CS Ice Star | | 3rd | | | | | | | |
| CS Lombardia Trophy | | | | 2nd | 1st | | | 5th | |
| CS Nebelhorn Trophy | | | | 2nd | | 1st | | | |
| CS Nepela Memorial | | | | | | | | | 5th |
| CS Trophée Métropole Nice | | | | | 1st | 1st | 1st | | |
| Challenge Cup | | | 3rd | | | | | | |
| Master's de Patinage | | | | 1st | 1st | 1st | | 3rd | 1st |
| Shanghai Trophy | | | | | | 1st | | | |
| Sonja Henje Trophy | | | | | | | 1st | | |
| Trophée Métropole Nice | | | | | | | | 1st | |

Competition placements at junior level
| Season | 2014–15 | 2015–16 | 2016–17 | 2017–18 | 2018–19 | 2019–20 |
|---|---|---|---|---|---|---|
| Winter Youth Olympics | | 10th | | | | |
| World Junior Championships | | | | 17th | 6th | 7th |
| Junior Grand Prix Final | | | | | 4th | |
| French Championships (Senior) | | 8th | 8th | 4th | | |
| French Championships (Junior) | 6th | 4th | 1st | 2nd | 1st | 1st |
| JGP Armenia | | | | | 1st | |
| JGP Canada | | | | | 3rd | |
| JGP Croatia | | | | 9th | | 8th |
| JGP Estonia | | | 12th | | | |
| JGP France | | | 14th | | | |
| JGP Italy | | | | 9th | | 5th |
| Cup of Nice | | 4th | 2nd | | | |
| European Youth Olympic Festival | | | 7th | | | |
| Master's de Patinage | 7th | 6th | 3rd | | 1st | |
| Tallinn Trophy | | 7th | | | | |

== Detailed results ==
ISU personal best scores in the +5/-5 GOE System
| Segment | Type | Score | Event |
|---|---|---|---|
| Total | TSS | 306.78 | 2023 Grand Prix de France |
| Short program | TSS | 102.55 | 2026 Winter Olympics |
| Short program | TES | 57.70 | 2023 Grand Prix de France |
| Short program | PCS | 45.67 | 2026 World Championships |
| Free skating | TSS | 207.17 | 2023 Cup of China |
| Free skating | TES | 116.83 | 2024 World Championships |
| Free skating | PCS | 92.07 | 2024 World Championships |

ISU personal best scores in the +3/-3 GOE System
| Segment | Type | Score | Event |
|---|---|---|---|
| Total | TSS | 183.46 | 2017 JGP Croatia |
| Short program | TSS | 64.11 | 2018 World Junior Championships |
| Short program | TES | 33.92 | 2018 World Junior Championships |
| Short program | PCS | 30.19 | 2018 World Junior Championships |
| Free skating | TSS | 122.18 | 2017 JGP Croatia |
| Free skating | TES | 63.76 | 2017 JGP Croatia |
| Free skating | PCS | 59.42 | 2017 JGP Croatia |

- Small medals for the short program and free skating are only awarded at ISU Championships.
- Medals at team events are awarded for the team result only. The individual placements at team events are listed in parentheses.

=== Senior level ===
Results in the 2015–16 season
| Date | Event | SP | | FS | | Total | |
| Date | Event | P | Score | P | Score | P | Score |
|---|---|---|---|---|---|---|---|
| Dec 17–19, 2015 | (France) 2016 French Championships | 10 | 44.49 | 7 | 105.26 | 8 | 149.75 |

Results in the 2016–17 season
| Date | Event | SP | | FS | | Total | |
| Date | Event | P | Score | P | Score | P | Score |
|---|---|---|---|---|---|---|---|
| Dec 15–17, 2016 | (France) 2017 French Championships | 9 | 51.46 | 4 | 123.42 | 8 | 174.88 |

Results in the 2017–18 season
| Date | Event | SP | | FS | | Total | |
| Date | Event | P | Score | P | Score | P | Score |
|---|---|---|---|---|---|---|---|
| Dec 14–16, 2017 | (France) 2018 French Championships | 4 | 68.48 | 3 | 142.11 | 4 | 210.59 |

Results in the 2018–19 season
| Date | Event | SP | | FS | | Total | |
| Date | Event | P | Score | P | Score | P | Score |
|---|---|---|---|---|---|---|---|
| Nov 11–18, 2018 | (Austria) 2018 CS Alpen Trophy | 13 | 59.24 | 3 | 128.66 | 7 | 187.90 |
| Dec 13–15, 2018 | (France) 2019 French Championships | 3 | 74.23 | 2 | 152.13 | 2 | 226.36 |
| Jan 21–27, 2019 | (Belarus) 2019 European Championships | 13 | 76.70 | 9 | 141.36 | 12 | 218.06 |
| Apr 11–14, 2019 | (Japan) 2019 World Team Trophy | 11 | 72.56 | 12 | 132.11 | 4 (12) | 204.67 |

Results in the 2019–20 season
| Date | Event | SP | | FS | | Total | |
| Date | Event | P | Score | P | Score | P | Score |
|---|---|---|---|---|---|---|---|
| Oct 18–20, 2019 | (Belarus) 2019 CS Ice Star | 4 | 66.48 | 2 | 149.09 | 3 | 215.57 |
| Dec 4–7, 2019 | (Croatia) 2019 CS Golden Spin of Zagreb | 13 | 69.06 | 6 | 144.92 | 7 | 213.98 |
| Dec 19–21, 2019 | (France) 2020 French Championships | 2 | 87.62 | 2 | 163.68 | 2 | 251.30 |
| Jan 20–26, 2020 | (Austria) 2020 European Championships | 24 | 65.21 | 6 | 154.68 | 11 | 219.89 |

Results in the 2020–21 season
| Date | Event | SP | | FS | | Total | |
| Date | Event | P | Score | P | Score | P | Score |
|---|---|---|---|---|---|---|---|
| Feb 5–6, 2021 | (France) 2021 French Championships | 2 | 78.50 | 2 | 165.65 | 2 | 244.15 |
| Feb 26–28, 2021 | (Netherlands) 2021 International Challenge Cup | 4 | 79.49 | 3 | 161.62 | 3 | 241.11 |
| Apr 15–18, 2021 | (Japan) 2021 World Team Trophy | 8 | 78.28 | 9 | 152.64 | 5 (8) | 230.92 |

Results in the 2021–22 season
| Date | Event | SP | | FS | | Total | |
| Date | Event | P | Score | P | Score | P | Score |
|---|---|---|---|---|---|---|---|
| Sep 10–12, 2021 | (Italy) 2021 CS Lombardia Trophy | 2 | 80.54 | 3 | 156.85 | 2 | 237.39 |
| Sep 22–25, 2021 | (Germany) 2021 CS Nebelhorn Trophy | 2 | 89.23 | 3 | 154.55 | 2 | 243.78 |
| Sep 30 – Oct 2, 2021 | (France) 2021 Master's de Patinage | 3 | 78.56 | 1 | 177.69 | 1 | 256.25 |
| Oct 22–24, 2021 | (United States) 2021 Skate America | 10 | 67.60 | 7 | 149.92 | 9 | 217.52 |
| Nov 19–21, 2021 | 2021 Internationaux de France | 7 | 84.47 | 9 | 158.82 | 8 | 243.29 |
| Dec 16–18, 2021 | (France) 2022 French Championships | 1 | 95.31 | 2 | 162.37 | 2 | 257.68 |
| Feb 8–10, 2022 | (China) 2022 Winter Olympics | 14 | 86.74 | 13 | 163.41 | 14 | 250.15 |
| Mar 21–27, 2022 | (France) 2022 World Championships | 10 | 90.97 | 6 | 175.15 | 8 | 266.12 |

Results in the 2022–23 season
| Date | Event | SP | | FS | | Total | |
| Date | Event | P | Score | P | Score | P | Score |
|---|---|---|---|---|---|---|---|
| Sep 16–19, 2022 | (Italy) 2022 CS Lombardia Trophy | 2 | 84.69 | 1 | 152.50 | 1 | 237.19 |
| Oct 6–8, 2022 | (France) 2022 Master's de Patinage | 1 | 85.60 | 1 | 193.06 | 1 | 278.66 |
| Oct 19–23, 2022 | (France) 2022 Trophée Métropole Nice Côte d'Azur | 1 | 90.57 | 1 | 147.86 | 1 | 238.43 |
| Nov 4–6, 2022 | 2022 Grand Prix de France | 3 | 88.00 | 1 | 180.98 | 1 | 268.98 |
| Nov 18–20, 2022 | (Japan) 2022 NHK Trophy | 3 | 87.44 | 4 | 163.01 | 5 | 250.45 |
| Dec 15–17, 2022 | (France) 2023 French Championships | 1 | 96.42 | 1 | 182.94 | 1 | 279.36 |
| Jan 25–29, 2023 | (Finland) 2023 European Championships | 1 | 96.53 | 2 | 171.24 | 1 | 267.77 |
| Mar 22–26, 2023 | (Japan) 2023 World Championships | 12 | 79.78 | 8 | 173.33 | 10 | 253.11 |
| Apr 13–16, 2023 | (Japan) 2023 World Team Trophy | 5 | 92.82 | 10 | 154.60 | 5 (9) | 247.42 |

Results in the 2023–24 season
| Date | Event | SP | | FS | | Total | |
| Date | Event | P | Score | P | Score | P | Score |
|---|---|---|---|---|---|---|---|
| Sep 20–23, 2023 | (Germany) 2023 CS Nebelhorn Trophy | 1 | 95.17 | 1 | 184.40 | 1 | 279.57 |
| Sep 28–30, 2023 | (France) 2023 Master's de Patinage | 1 | 101.87 | 1 | 200.84 | 1 | 302.71 |
| Oct 3–5, 2023 | (China) 2023 Shanghai Trophy | 2 | 84.00 | 1 | 198.80 | 1 | 282.80 |
| Oct 18–22, 2023 | (France) 2023 Trophée Métropole Nice Côte d'Azur | 1 | 109.04 | 1 | 189.57 | 1 | 298.61 |
| Nov 3–5, 2023 | 2023 Grand Prix de France | 2 | 101.07 | 1 | 205.71 | 1 | 306.78 |
| Nov 10–12, 2023 | 2023 Cup of China | 2 | 91.21 | 1 | 207.17 | 1 | 298.38 |
| Dec 7–10, 2023 | (China) 2023–24 Grand Prix Final | 6 | 88.36 | 3 | 190.02 | 4 | 278.28 |
| Dec 13–14, 2023 | (France) 2024 French Championships | 1 | 99.82 | 1 | 204.59 | 1 | 304.41 |
| Jan 8–14, 2024 | (Lithuania) 2024 European Championships | 1 | 94.13 | 1 | 182.04 | 1 | 276.17 |
| Mar 18–24, 2024 | (Canada) 2024 World Championships | 19 | 77.49 | 2 | 206.90 | 3 | 284.39 |

Results in the 2024–25 season
| Date | Event | SP | | FS | | Total | |
| Date | Event | P | Score | P | Score | P | Score |
|---|---|---|---|---|---|---|---|
| Oct 16–20, 2024 | (France) 2024 CS Trophée Métropole Nice Côte d'Azur | 1 | 96.74 | 1 | 175.64 | 1 | 272.38 |
| Nov 1–3, 2024 | 2024 Grand Prix de France | 8 | 74.90 | 1 | 171.68 | 1 | 246.58 |
| Nov 22–24, 2024 | 2024 Cup of China | 3 | 91.22 | 3 | 161.31 | 3 | 252.53 |
| Jan 28 – Feb 2, 2025 | (Estonia) 2025 European Championships | 1 | 93.12 | 3 | 164.87 | 3 | 257.99 |
| Mar 6–9, 2025 | (Norway) 2025 Sonja Henje Trophy | 1 | 98.45 | 1 | 183.54 | 1 | 281.99 |
| Mar 25–30, 2025 | (United States) 2025 World Championships | 9 | 87.22 | 3 | 188.26 | 4 | 275.48 |
| Apr 17–20, 2025 | (Japan) 2025 World Team Trophy | 2 | 96.16 | 6 | 168.47 | 4 (3) | 264.63 |

Results in the 2025–26 season
| Date | Event | SP | | FS | | Total | |
| Date | Event | P | Score | P | Score | P | Score |
|---|---|---|---|---|---|---|---|
| Aug 28–30, 2025 | (France) 2025 Master's de Patinage | 2 | 82.57 | 3 | 136.99 | 3 | 219.56 |
| Sep 11–14, 2025 | (Italy) 2025 CS Lombardia Trophy | 6 | 86.06 | 5 | 158.30 | 5 | 244.36 |
| Oct 1–5, 2025 | (France) 2025 Trophée Métropole Nice Côte d'Azur | 1 | 97.62 | 1 | 156.49 | 1 | 254.11 |
| Oct 17–19, 2025 | 2025 Grand Prix de France | 5 | 84.87 | 2 | 196.08 | 2 | 280.95 |
| Nov 21–23, 2025 | (Finland) 2025 Finlandia Trophy | 1 | 92.50 | 2 | 164.48 | 2 | 256.98 |
| Dec 4-6, 2025 | (Japan) 2025-26 Grand Prix Final | 5 | 78.49 | 5 | 180.15 | 5 | 258.64 |
| Dec 18-20, 2025 | (France) 2026 French Championships | 2 | 85.42 | 2 | 159.01 | 2 | 244.43 |
| Feb 10–13, 2026 | (Italy) 2026 Winter Olympics | 3 | 102.55 | 12 | 166.72 | 7 | 269.27 |
| Mar 24–29, 2026 | (Czech Republic) 2026 World Championships | 2 | 101.85 | 8 | 169.71 | 5 | 271.56 |

Results in the 2026–27 season
| Date | Event | SP | | FS | | Total | |
| Date | Event | P | Score | P | Score | P | Score |
|---|---|---|---|---|---|---|---|
| Aug 27–29, 2026 | (France) 2026 Master's de Patinage | 1 | 78.13 | 2 | 136.70 | 1 | 214.83 |
| Sep 24–27, 2026 | (Slovakia) 2026 CS Nepela Memorial | 9 | 79.18 | 4 | 170.17 | 5 | 249.35 |
| Oct 23-25, 2026 | 2026 Grand Prix de France | 1 | 102.46 | 1 | 181.78 | 1 | 282.24 |

=== Junior level ===
Results in the 2014–15 season
| Date | Event | SP | | FS | | Total | |
| Date | Event | P | Score | P | Score | P | Score |
|---|---|---|---|---|---|---|---|
| Oct 2–4, 2014 | (France) 2014 Master's de Patinage | 7 | 41.39 | 7 | 80.12 | 7 | 121.51 |
| Feb 20–22, 2015 | (France) 2015 French Championships (Junior) | 7 | 44.08 | 7 | 85.54 | 6 | 129.62 |

Results in the 2015–16 season
| Date | Event | SP | | FS | | Total | |
| Date | Event | P | Score | P | Score | P | Score |
|---|---|---|---|---|---|---|---|
| Oct 8–10, 2015 | (France) 2015 Master's de Patinage | 6 | 40.21 | 4 | 87.69 | 6 | 127.90 |
| Oct 14–18, 2015 | (France) 2015 International Cup of Nice | 9 | 43.32 | 4 | 94.50 | 4 | 137.82 |
| Nov 18–22, 2015 | (Estonia) 2015 Tallinn Trophy | 9 | 44.69 | 7 | 98.19 | 7 | 142.88 |
| Feb 12–21, 2016 | (Norway) 2016 Winter Youth Olympics | 8 | 49.19 | 10 | 101.46 | 10 | 150.65 |
| Feb 27–28, 2016 | (France) 2016 French Championships (Junior) | 3 | 54.97 | 4 | 100.09 | 4 | 155.06 |

Results in the 2016–17 season
| Date | Event | SP | | FS | | Total | |
| Date | Event | P | Score | P | Score | P | Score |
|---|---|---|---|---|---|---|---|
| Aug 24–28, 2016 | 2016 JGP France | 15 | 49.36 | 12 | 100.15 | 14 | 149.51 |
| Sep 22–24, 2016 | (France) 2016 International Cup of Nice | 6 | 49.31 | 2 | 111.40 | 2 | 160.71 |
| Sep 28 – Oct 2, 2016 | 2016 JGP Estonia | 16 | 51.01 | 11 | 107.96 | 12 | 158.97 |
| Oct 6–8, 2016 | (France) 2016 Master's de Patinage | 6 | 46.02 | 1 | 107.69 | 3 | 153.71 |
| Feb 13–15, 2017 | (Turkey) 2017 European Youth Olympic Winter Festival | 9 | 44.19 | 3 | 102.30 | 7 | 146.39 |
| Feb 24–26, 2017 | (France) 2017 French Championships (Junior) | 2 | 62.71 | 1 | 116.42 | 1 | 179.13 |

Results in the 2017–18 season
| Date | Event | SP | | FS | | Total | |
| Date | Event | P | Score | P | Score | P | Score |
|---|---|---|---|---|---|---|---|
| Sep 27–30, 2017 | 2017 JGP Croatia | 8 | 61.28 | 9 | 122.18 | 9 | 183.46 |
| Oct 11–14, 2017 | 2017 JGP Italy | 9 | 59.96 | 9 | 121.06 | 9 | 181.02 |
| Feb 23–25, 2018 | (France) 2018 French Championships (Junior) | 2 | 63.27 | 1 | 124.29 | 2 | 187.56 |
| Mar 5–11, 2018 | (Bulgaria) 2018 World Junior Championships | 16 | 64.11 | 19 | 111.48 | 17 | 175.59 |

Results in the 2018–19 season
| Date | Event | SP | | FS | | Total | |
| Date | Event | P | Score | P | Score | P | Score |
|---|---|---|---|---|---|---|---|
| Sep 12–15, 2018 | 2018 JGP Canada | 5 | 65.85 | 3 | 133.29 | 3 | 199.14 |
| Sep 25–27, 2018 | (France) 2018 Master's de Patinage | 1 | 76.60 | 1 | 154.52 | 1 | 231.12 |
| Oct 10–13, 2018 | 2018 JGP Armenia | 3 | 70.50 | 2 | 135.33 | 1 | 205.83 |
| Dec 6–9, 2018 | (Canada) 2018–19 JGP Final | 5 | 66.48 | 3 | 140.56 | 4 | 207.04 |
| Feb 22–24, 2019 | (France) 2019 French Championships (Junior) | 1 | 67.63 | 1 | 150.41 | 1 | 218.04 |
| Mar 4–10, 2019 | (Croatia) 2019 World Junior Championships | 8 | 77.74 | 6 | 142.17 | 6 | 219.91 |

Results in the 2019–20 season
| Date | Event | SP | | FS | | Total | |
| Date | Event | P | Score | P | Score | P | Score |
|---|---|---|---|---|---|---|---|
| Sep 25–28, 2019 | 2019 JGP Croatia | 11 | 60.17 | 7 | 131.99 | 8 | 192.16 |
| Oct 2–5, 2019 | 2019 JGP Italy | 8 | 66.20 | 6 | 140.20 | 5 | 206.40 |
| Feb 7–9, 2020 | (France) 2020 French Championships (Junior) | 1 | 81.51 | 1 | 146.92 | 1 | 228.43 |
| Mar 2–8, 2020 | (Estonia) 2020 World Junior Championships | 12 | 74.61 | 7 | 139.28 | 7 | 213.89 |
