= John H. Harris (entertainment) =

John H. Harris

John H. Harris (1898–1969) was an entertainment executive from Pittsburgh, Pennsylvania. He was the son of movie theater pioneer John P. Harris, and is best known as the long-time owner and impresario of the Ice Capades. He was also an early owner and promoter of professional ice hockey teams. He was married for ten years to ice skating star Donna Atwood.

== Early life ==
John H. Harris, nicknamed "Johnny", was six years old in 1905 when his father, John P. Harris, and a partner opened their first Nickelodeon theater in Pittsburgh. At a young age, he showed an entrepreneurial bent by operating a lemonade stand and a successful paper route. He is said to have sold more peanuts than any other vendor at Forbes Field. After U.S. Army service in 1918, he transferred from Catholic University to Georgetown University, where he received a law degree in 1921. He worked in the family entertainment business during vacations from school, and entered it full-time upon graduation.

== Early career ==
At Harris Amusement Companies, his first job was to manage the Strand Theater in Youngstown, Pennsylvania, and his second was to revive a vaudeville theater in McKeesport. By the time of his father's death in 1926, young Johnny was managing all the company's theaters outside of Pittsburgh. He soon increased the stable from 14 theaters to 25.

== Duquesne Garden ==
In the depression year of 1932, John leased the Duquesne Garden arena and began offering a variety of entertainments. Like other arenas, these included skating, ice hockey, rodeo, boxing, bicycle racing, and more. The venture was successful, pulling the family company out of debt. In 1936, Harris founded the Pittsburgh Hornets, an American Hockey League team that was to play in Pittsburgh for 26 years. Harris brought in Olympic figure skater Sonja Henie to entertain the audience between periods of hockey games. On March 31, 1936, she created a local sensation when she performed at a playoff game between the Pittsburgh Yellow Jackets and the Atlantic City Seagulls. This event strengthened Harris' notion that ice skating could be a good spectator event, and he began to implement his plans for an ice spectacular.

== Ice Capades ==
In February 1940, Harris and eight other arena managers met in Hershey, Pennsylvania, where Harris submitted a proposal to establish an ice show to play at their arenas. The proposal was greeted favorably, and the group organized the Ice Capades. Harris quickly took charge of the show, using his film and entertainment background to model it after Broadway theatre extravaganzas. He closely supervised every phase of the show, including the hiring of performers, who lived in a closely supervised boarding school atmosphere when they were traveling. One of the show's early performances was in Duquesne Gardens in September 1940. By 1945 it was playing in 20 North American cities, with only four weeks off in a year. Harris traveled with the Ice Capades for the first three weeks of every year's new show, and attended all 26 performances when it visited Pittsburgh. Printed programs for the shows featured the phrase "John H. Harris presents... Ice Capades."

In 1941 Harris hired 16-year-old figure skating champion Donna Atwood, who quickly became the star of the show, performing as such for fifteen years. He married her, 27 years his junior, in 1949; the couple divorced ten years later.

In 1963, John H. Harris sold the Ice Capades for $5.5 million. He died in 1969 at age 70.
