= Bobby Specht =

American figure skater

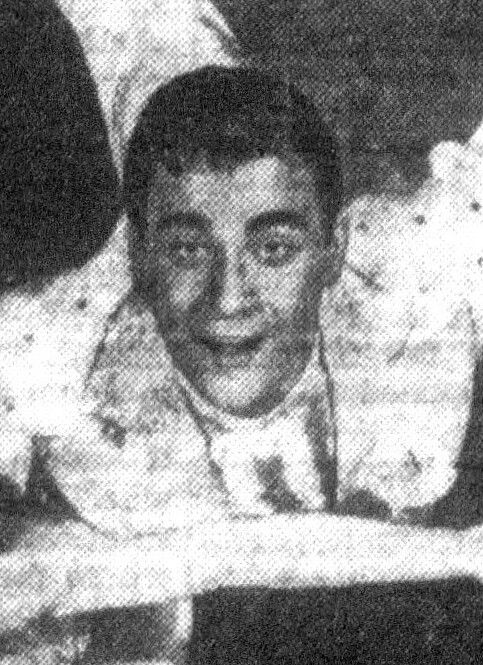
- Specht, circa 1950

Personal information
- Born: October 22, 1921
- Died: January 11, 1999 (aged 77)

Figure skating career
- Country: United States
- Skating club: Chicago FSC

Robert Specht (October 22, 1921 – January 11, 1999 in Palm Springs, CA) was an American figure skater who competed in pairs and men's singles. He won the bronze medal in pairs with partner Joan Mitchell at the United States Figure Skating Championships in 1941 and captured the gold in men's singles the following year. After serving in the Air Force during World War II, he skated for many years with the Ice Capades.

== Results ==
(men's singles)

Event	1940	1942
U.S. Championships	1st J	1st

(pairs with Mitchell)

Event	1941
U.S. Championships	3rd
