= Ice Capades =

Touring shows featuring ice skating

Ice Capades Inc.
- Trade name: Ice Capades; Dorothy Hamill's Ice Capades (1993–1996)
- Formerly: Ice Capades (1940–1991); Dorothy Hamill International (1993–1995)
- Founded: February 1940; 86 years ago in Hershey, Pennsylvania
- Founders: Arena Managers Association
- Defunct: August 15, 1997; 29 years ago
- Fate: closed down
- Key people: John H. Harris; (founder & president 1940–1964); Dorothy Hamill; (president 1993–1995)
- Parent: Arena Managers Association (1940–1964); Metromedia (1964–1986); International Broadcasting Corporation (1986–1993); Dorothy Hamill International (1993–95); International Family Entertainment, Inc. (1995–1995); Del Wilber & Associates (1996–1997)
- Divisions: The East Company (1940–1997); Ice Cycles (1946–1956); West Company; Continental Company

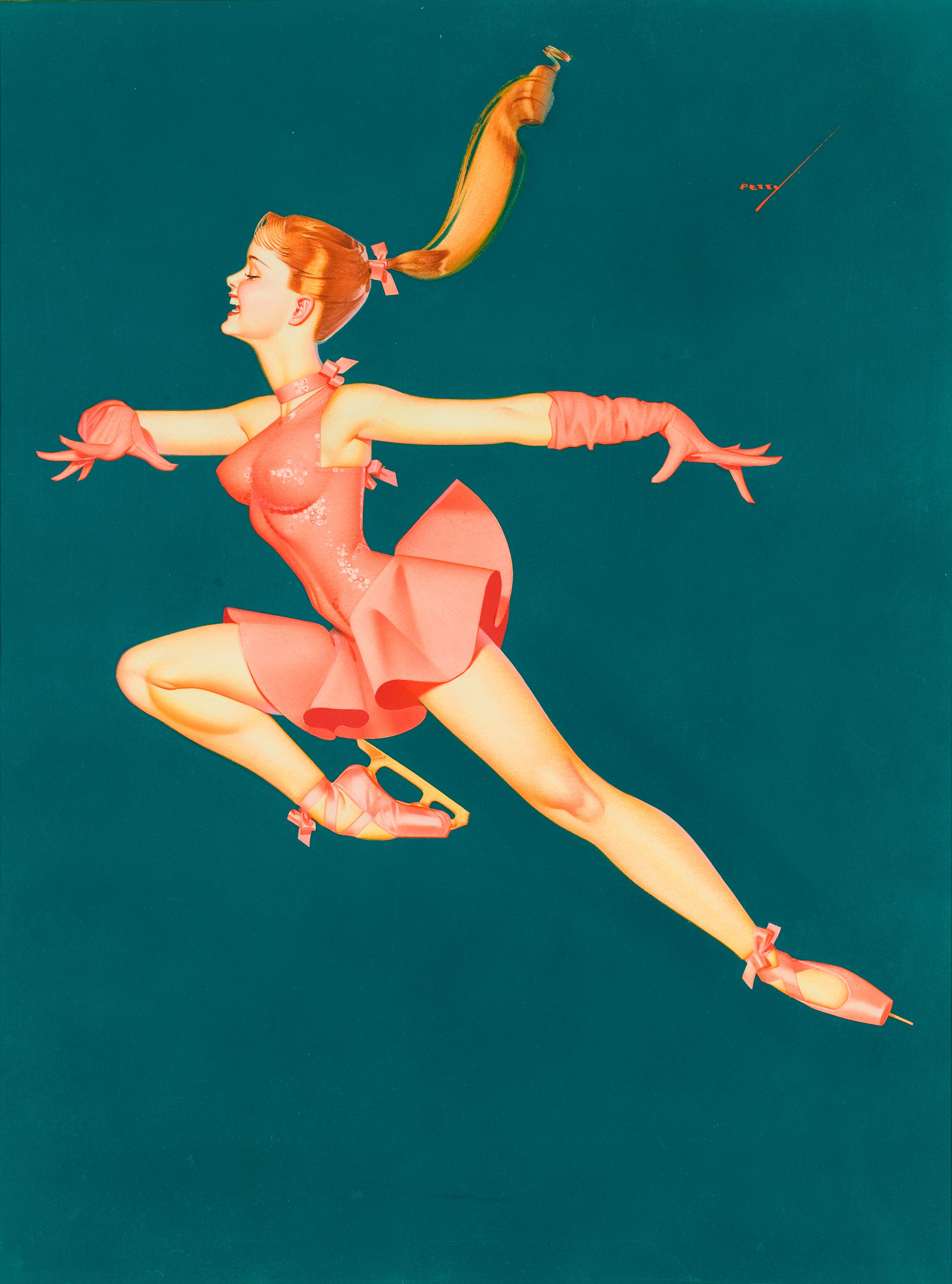
Promotional illustration for the 1965 Ice Capades

The Ice Capades were traveling entertainment shows featuring theatrical ice skating performances. Shows often featured former Olympic and US National Champion figure skaters who had retired from formal competition. Started in 1940, the Ice Capades grew rapidly and prospered for 50 years. A decline in popularity ensued in the 1980s, and the show went out of business around 1995. There have been several attempts to revive the show and its name.

Similar traditional ice-skating entertainment shows included the Ice Follies and Holiday on Ice.

== History ==
Ice Capades was founded in February 1940 in Hershey, Pennsylvania, by nine men who called themselves the Arena Managers Association. They met to discuss forming an ice show to play in their arenas during the 1940–1941 entertainment season. The arenas represented were all well-known venues of the day:

- Boston Garden (Massachusetts) – represented by Walter A. Brown
- Buffalo Memorial Auditorium (New York) – Louis Jacobs
- Cleveland Arena (Ohio) – Al Sutphin
- Hershey Sports Arena (Pennsylvania) – John B. Sollenberger
- New Haven Arena (Connecticut) – Nathan Podoloff, brother of Maurice Podoloff
- Philadelphia Arena, Pennsylvania – Peter A. Tyrrell
- Pittsburgh's Duquesne Gardens, Pennsylvania – John H. Harris
- Rhode Island Auditorium, Rhode Island – Louis Pieri
- Springfield Coliseum, Massachusetts – Edward Shore

In 1936, Harris had hired the legendary skater Sonja Henie to perform between periods of ice hockey games. She created a sensation among Pittsburghers, confirming his faith in ice skating's potential as a spectator amusement. The other arena managers agreed with this assessment, chose the name "Ice Capades", and formed a group of skaters.

=== Early years ===
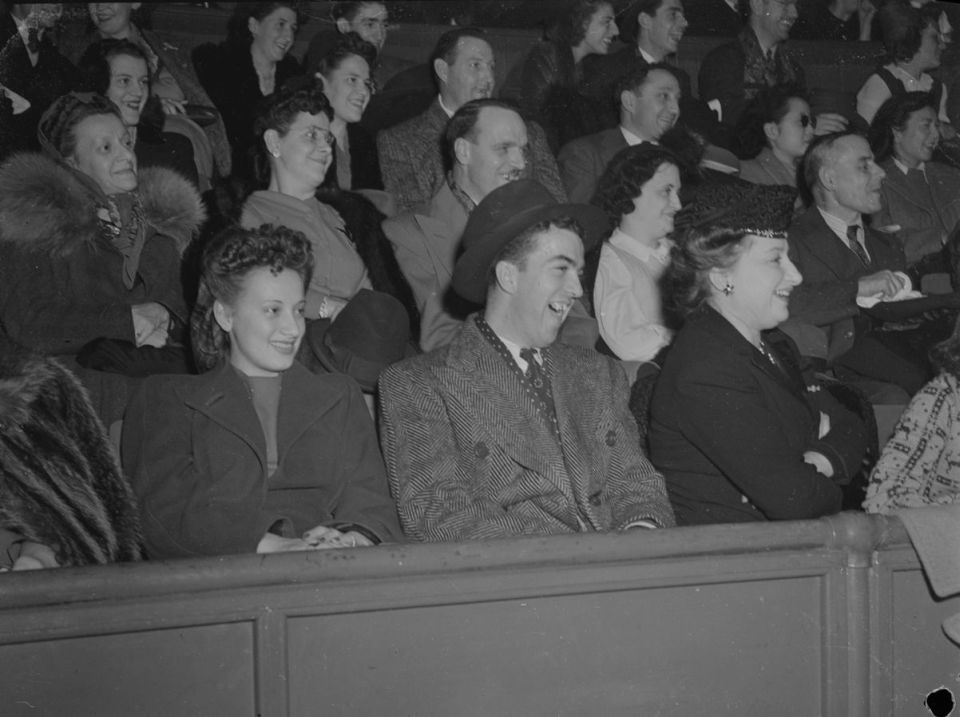
Audience at the Ice Capades show, Montreal Forum, 1944

Ice Capades program from 1945, showing the many production numbers, and the large size of the cast. Single-themed shows had not yet been developed.

The group's first performance was four months after its founding, on June 16, 1940, at New Orleans Municipal Auditorium. The show closed there on June 29 and moved to Atlantic City Convention Hall, where it played nightly from July 19 through September 2. Famous skaters in the large cast included Belita, Vera Hruba, and Robin Lee. The group's first touring season under the Ice Capades name covered 24 cities between November 1940 and May 1941.

The show's success spawned two films from Republic Pictures, Ice-Capades (1941), and Ice-Capades Revue (1942). The films featured actors and entertainers such as James Ellison, Ellen Drew, Jerry Colonna, and Phil Silvers, as well as the Ice Capades skaters. They were not considered to be films of quality, and the first one was panned by The New York Times.

In 1942, the show featured world champion skater Megan Taylor, new talent Donna Atwood, and an acrobatic team from Boston called the Hub Trio featuring Leonard Mullen, Kenneth Mullen and Eddie Raiche. They were the first in the world to perform a back flip without the use of hands. The next year, U.S. figure skating champion Bobby Specht joined the show; he would be actively involved with Ice Capades for the next 31 years. 1943 also introduced the "Old Smoothies", Orrin Markhus, 51, and his partner Irma Thomas, 44, plus Trixie, the skating juggler. The production number "Toys for Sale" was the first story on ice with original words and music.

=== Later years ===
Ice Capades shows were extremely popular for several decades and became a household name, although they were criticized by some as kitsch. From 1941 through 1981, the Ice Capades show was a summertime fixture at what was then known as Atlantic City Convention Hall.

In 1946 Ice Cycles, a co-production, was formed with Ice Follies. In 1949, Ice Follies left the Ice Cycles show leaving it under Ice Capades' ownership. Starting in 1949, Ice Capades started adding Disney's character segment to their performances. Costumes from those shows were used at the opening of Disneyland in 1955, and some performers were hired away by Disney.

Harris sold the company circa 1964 to Metromedia. By the mid 1970s, Ice Capades had grown to three different touring companies under one Ice Capades umbrella: The East Company (the original 1940 company), the West Company, and the Continental Company (formed in 1974). In this period, they owned several railroad baggage cars that were used to transport the show. In 1986, then-owner Metromedia sold Ice Capades, 15 Ice Chalet skating rinks, and the Harlem Globetrotters as a package to International Broadcasting Corporation for $30 million.

=== Dorothy Hamill's Ice Capades ===
A slow decline in popularity began by the end of the 1980s. The parent company went bankrupt in 1991. Olympic champion Scott Hamilton joined the show in 1984 but later left to start his own show, Stars on Ice. On June 24, 1993, Dorothy Hamill, who headlined the East Company from 1977 to 1984, bought Ice Capades' assets in a bankruptcy sale via Dorothy Hamill International company. Hamill International developed Frozen in Time: Cinderella on Ice, a theatrical style show billed as Dorothy Hamill's Ice Capades. The new company took on millions in loans to stay afloat, but attendance figures remained stagnant. In May 1994, the Shriners dropped its sponsorship of the Christmas show in favor of Disney On Ice.

In February 1995, Hamill sold the company for $10 million to television evangelist Pat Robertson's company, International Family Entertainment (IFE). Hamill and her husband, Dr. Ken Forsythe, were retained as president and CEO, respectively. Ice Capades planned a tour of arenas as well as a TV special in China's Tiananmen Square but went out of business a short time later.

The tour had a lackluster season which led Hamill to leave the company. IFE then searched for a management firm to handle the touring company for an equity stake. Instead, however, IFE sold Ice Capades in late 1995, to Del Wilber & Associates, while retaining the option to reacquire a majority ownership stake for 10 years.

In 1996, Ice Capades and Metro-Goldwyn-Mayer developed The Magic of MGM, which included Dairy Queen among its sponsors. On August 15, 1997, Del Wilber shut down operations and laid off the performers. IFE had apparently continued to fund the Ice Capades as a secured creditor. IFE was acquired by Fox Kids Worldwide, funding was halted, and two scheduled tours were canceled.

== Analysis ==
Analysts believe the increasing popularity of the sport of figure skating meant that more sophisticated audiences came to prefer straightforward Olympic-style ice-skating competitions, or skating shows for adults (i.e., without cartoon characters), such as Stars on Ice. At the same time, shows such as Disney on Ice (featuring Disney cartoon characters) successfully competed for the child audience.

=== Revivals and reunions ===
In the fall of 2000, Ice Capades was resurrected by Garden Entertainment in its original format, with a large cast of skaters. The new show was conceived, directed, and choreographed by the former German pair skating champion Almut Lehmann Peyper. The show was not a financial success and closed in November 2000, canceling the remaining tour dates.

Another attempt to revive Ice Capades was made in the spring of 2008, with plans for a tent show production called "Mystika", billed as "Cirque Meets Ice". In mid-August 2008, auditions were held in Lake Placid, New York for the all new Ice Capades. Developed by Entertainment Holdings and Red Brick Entertainment, Ice Capades was announced for production as live skating shows, television specials, episodic series, and web content. Three-time U.S. pairs champion and two-time Olympian JoJo Starbuck was named as Artistic Director. However, in April 2009, the tour was canceled by its organizers, Garden Family Shows, stranding many of the performers without pay and leaving suppliers unpaid.

== Reunions ==
Former Ice Capades skaters have organized reunions, typically held every five years. The 2010 reunion, held in Las Vegas, commemorated the 70th anniversary of the founding of the Ice Capades, and was attended by more than 500 people. The 75th Diamond Jubilee Celebration was held in June 2015.

== Productions ==
Licensed characters and properties used in productions included "A Flintstone Fantasy" (1967), "Hey Kids, Meet The Snorks!" (1985) and "The Ewoks" (1986). From 1989 to 1990, as part of the show's 50th anniversary, the Ice Capades had a tour that featured a variety of segments, including appearances from Olympic medalist Elizabeth Manley, Super Mario Bros., and Barbie. On December 28, 1989, ABC aired the Ice Capades in a special hosted by Jason Bateman and Alyssa Milano. The special was written by Bruce Vilanch.

Ice Capades Tours

- 34th Edition featuring Gypsy Magic, The Golden Hamburger Caper (McDonald's characters), and the precision group performing as The Rangerettes (1973)
- 35th Edition featuring Stereopticon, It's Christmas Every Day, and the precision group (referred to as the Ice Capettes) performing Touch of Classe (1975)
- "Just for You" tour featuring Gym 'N Ice Tricks, A Pinball Fantasy, Happy Birthday Yogi Bear, and the World Famous Ice Capettes in Those Golden Girls (1975–76)
- "It's Magic-Time" tour featuring Grand Illusions, Island Magic, Chopin Fantasy, Scooby-Doo and the Gang From Magicland, and the World Famous Ice Capettes in Thirty-Two of a Kind (1976)
- "Make A Wish" tour featuring A Royal Welcome, Flintstone Frolics, An Oriental Fantasy, and precision skating by the Famous Ice Capettes (1978)
- "Star Struck" tour featuring Disco Encounters, Wiz City (Hanna-Barbera characters), and Radiant Stars precision skating by the Famous Ice Capettes (1979)
- "Let's Celebrate" tour featuring Latin Fire, The Magic Machine (Hanna-Barbera characters), and the Ice Capettes and Ice Cadets in Gershwin Hit Parade (1981)
- "Light Up the Ice" tour starring Toller Cranston (in select cities) featuring Alice at the Wonderland Ball, Journey to the Ice Age, and the World Famous Ice Capettes and Ice Cadets in Precision on Parade (1981–82)
- "Hello World Hello!" tour featuring Flight to Kismet, Smurfs Alive!, Viva Vegas Viva!, and the Very Best Ice Capettes and Ice Cadets precision number titled That's Jazz (1982)
- "Skates Alive" tour featuring Wow! It's On Ice!, Dingbats & Ice Blobs, and the Very Best Ice Capettes and Ice Cadets precision number titled Dudes, Dolls & Diamonds (1983)
- "Dream World: An Iced Delight" tour featuring For Your Ice Only, The Smurf That Learns to Fly, and the Greatest Precision Skaters in the World in the Star Time finale (1984)
- "Hooray for Ice!" starring Kitty & Peter Carruthers featuring Ravel's Bolero, Hey Kids Meet the Snorks, The Chiller, and the World's Greatest Precision skaters in Rhythms for the Now Generation (1985)
- "Bravo America: Bold, Bright, Beautiful" tour starring Paul Martini & Barbara Underhill featuring The Ewoks, Miss Liberty, and the World's Greatest Precision Skaters in Team Ice Capades (1986)
- "The Best of Times" featuring The Beatles Remembered, The World of Teddy Ruxpin, and the World's Greatest Precision Skaters in Top of the Line (1987)
- "Salute to Hollywood" starring Torvill & Dean (in select cities) featuring Noir Et Blanc- A Chess Fantasy, The California Raisins, and Our World Famous Precision Skaters in The Spectacles of Busby Berkeley (1988)
- "Return to Romance" starring Elizabeth Manley featuring The Reckless Voyage, From the World of Nintendo: Adventures of the Super Mario Brothers, and the World Famous Precision Skaters in The Magic of the Can Can (1989)
- "Golden Anniversary Edition" featuring The Golden Anniversary Ball, Barbie At the Big Top, Inside the Ice Capades Computer, and The Simpsons (1990)
- "On Top of the World" featuring A Night in Metropolis, The Haunted House on Ice Mountain, and the Ice Capades Precision Skaters in Sing, Sing, Sing (1991)
- "Made in America" starring Christopher Bowman and speed skater Cathy Turner featuring The Lovable Dolls: Raggedy Ann & Raggedy Andy, Frontier Days, and the World Famous Precision Skaters (1992)

Ice Capades theatrical shows

- Frozen in Time: Cinderella on Ice (1993)
- Hansel, Gretel, the Witch and the Cat (1994) an adaptation of Hansel and Gretel
- The Magic of MGM (September 1996)

=== Ice Cycles ===
In 1946, Ice Cycles was started as a co-production with Ice Follies and was designed to tour in smaller cities. They used skaters and production numbers from both tours. In 1949, Ice Follies left the Ice Cycles show, leaving it under Ice Capades' ownership. Ice Cycles continued as a second tier touring company. In 1956, the Ice Cycles name was dropped in favor of the name Ice Capades.

== Notable skaters ==
These are some of the many notable skaters who appeared in Ice Capades shows or were involved in other aspects of the company:

- Donna Atwood
- Tai Babilonia
- Belita
- Judy Blumberg
- Dick Button
- Linda Carbonetto
- Kitty Carruthers
- Peter Carruthers
- Tiffany Chin
- Robin Cousins
- Toller Cranston
- Wolfgang Danne
- Christopher Dean
- John Dowding
- Jacqueline du Bief
- Richard J. Eichorn, now known as Richie Rich
- Todd Eldredge
- Peggy Fleming
- Randy Gardner
- Margot Glockshuber
- Michel Grandjean
- Silvia Grandjean
- Dorothy Hamill
- Scott Hamilton
- Vera Hruba
- Maria Jelinek
- Otto Jelinek
- David Jenkins
- Johnny Johns
- Jane Kirby
- Michael Kirby
- Sonya Klopfer
- Terry Kubicka
- Donald Knight
- Erik Larson
- Robin Lee
- Tommy Litz
- Albert Lucas
- Janet Lynn
- Karen Magnussen
- Elizabeth Manley
- Paul Martini
- Melissa Militano
- John Nicks
- Lynn Nightingale
- Eleanor O'Meara
- Peter Oppegard
- Robert Paul
- Brian Pockar
- Ludmilla Protopopova
- Oleg Protopopov
- Edi Rada
- Guy Revell
- Barbara Roles
- Wolfgang Schwarz
- Barbara Ann Scott
- Michael Seibert
- Ron Shaver
- Ken Shelley
- Bobby Specht
- JoJo Starbuck
- Charlie Tickner
- Kay Thomson
- Megan Taylor
- Jayne Torvill
- Barbara Underhill
- Gary Visconti
- Barbara Wagner
- Jill Watson
- Ingrid Wendl
- Lorna Wighton
- Tim Wood
- Aja Zanova
- Elaine Zayak

== Portable ice rinks ==
In the early 1950s, the group started using portable ice rinks, called "tanks". This made it possible for them to perform in arenas that did not have their own ice surface, greatly expanding the number of venues where the show could operate. It took several days and 30–40 workers to install the tanks. In the late 1960s, Ice Capades designed and patented a new portable ice rink system that could be installed in less than 10 hours on most arena basketball floors or other surfaces.

== Chalet skating rinks ==
In 1966, Ice Capades bought an ice skating rink in Topanga Plaza shopping center, Canoga Park, California. The success of this venture led to the establishment of the Ice Capades Chalet Division, which owned and operated about 13 rinks, ran ice skating schools, and developed a curriculum that could develop a skater from beginner to competitive skater. Most of the Chalets were in California and Texas; others were in Arizona, Georgia, and North Carolina. The chalets were started by Michael Kirby, former voice of Ice Capades shows, and eventually expanded to over two dozen facilities.

== In popular culture ==
The show has been widely parodied, for example by cartoonist Gary Larson's comic strip The Far Side with good-natured comics captioned "Ice Crusades" and "Dirt Capades".

In the movie Barbie, when Ken is throwing all of Barbie's clothes out the window one of the outfits is an Ice Capades themed costume which Ice Capades did partner with Mattel to sell licensed dolls and doll outfits.

== See also ==
- Disney on Ice
- Ice Follies
- Ice-Capades, 1941 film
- Ice-Capades Revue, 1942 film
- "Nice-Capades", 2015 TV episode
