= Sullenberger =

Sullenberger may refer to:

- Sully Sullenberger (born 1951), American airline pilot
- Sydney Sullenberger (born 2004), American archer
- Sully (film), American biographical drama
- Sullenberger Aviation Museum, in Charlotte, North Carolina
- 108496 Sullenberger, minor planet
