= John B. Sollenberger =

American sports and entertainment executive

John Burtner Sollenberger (June 13, 1897 – August 29, 1967) was an American sports and entertainment executive closely associated with Milton S. Hershey and the development of Hershey, Pennsylvania. He was born on a farm in Cumberland County, Pennsylvania. At age 16 he enrolled in a stenographic school and became an exceptional stenographer. This led to his joining the Hershey Improvement Company about two years later, and to a long association with various Hershey enterprises.

== Entertainment ==
From 1936 until his retirement in 1962, Sollenberger was general manager of all the attractions in the Hershey empire, including the Hershey Sports Arena and the amusement complex that grew to become Hersheypark. In February 1940, he and eight other arena managers met in Hershey and organized the Ice Capades. Sollenberger brought many famous entertainers to Hershey: Fred Waring, Victor Borge, Sonja Henie, Tallulah Bankhead and Eleanor Holm all knew him as "JB". He had significant and far-reaching impact on the development of Hershey as a vacation and entertainment destination. Many of his innovations are still in place today.

== Ice hockey ==
Sollenberger was an early figure in the establishment of the American Hockey League (AHL), and since 1955 the John B. Sollenberger Trophy is awarded to that league's leading scorer. His involvement with the league was due to his association with the Hershey Bears, one of the nation's oldest professional hockey teams. In December 2012, on the 75th anniversary of the Bears' first home game, John B. Sollenberger became one of the seven members of the first class to be inducted into the Hershey Bears Hall of Fame.

== Business and finance ==
From 1949 to 1962, John B. Sollenberger was president of Hershey Estates, the organization responsible for operating all the non-chocolate businesses established by Milton Hershey, including the entertainment venues. He was made President of the Hershey Trust Company (1956) and then President of the Hershey Bank (1957). He held these positions until his retirement in 1962.
