= Paul Sollenberger =

American astronomer (1891–1995)

- Born: August 14, 1891; Kokomo, Indiana, U.S.
- Died: May 22, 1995 (aged 103); Huntington Beach, California, United States
- Education: Ball State
- Occupation: Astronomer

Paul Sollenberger (August 14, 1891 – May 5, 1995) was an American astronomer and first civilian director of Time Service at the United States Naval Observatory. He made important contributions to the various designs, including quartz crystal clocks, chronographs, and the photographic zenith tube that greatly increased time precision. He also has a minor planet named after him.

== Early life ==
Sollenberger was born on August 14, 1891, to John Sollenberger and Olive Hilands Sollenberger.

Sollenberger went to college at Marion Normal College (Ball State College) in Marion, Indiana, receiving his Bachelor's degree in 1913. He developed his passion for astronomy after taking a twelve week astronomy course at the college. He applied to the Naval Observatory after seeing advertisements for "Naval Observatory Time."

== Career ==
In 1914, Sollenberger began work at the Naval Observatory, with H. R. Morgan. They worked on the 9-inch transit circle. In 1919, he transferred to the Division of Nautical Instruments and Time. In 1928, he became the head of the Division, which position he held until his retirement in 1953. He was the first civilian direct of the Division.

Sollenberger helped contribute to the design of quartz crystal clocks, chronographs, and the photographic zenith tube, which increased our ability to keep the precision of time. Before, he began working at the Naval Observatory, the pendulum clocks were built by Riefler and Shortt and accurate only to several hundredths of a second per year, but Sollenberger wanted a greater degree of precision. The quartz crystal clocks were capable of greater precision, but Bell Laboratories were the only ones producing them at the time, so Sollenberger made his own and was able to achieve precision to one-thousandth of a second. They remained to time standard until atomic clocks were established in 1966.

In 1926, Sollenberger also was part of the San Diego World Longitude Operation. In 1929, he was a member of the Naval Observatory eclipse expedition to the Philippines. In 1949, he established the Naval Observatory Time Service station with Photographic Zenith Tube (PZT) at the Coast Guard radio station in Richmond West, Florida in Miami-Dade County. The station is still in operation, but the PZT has been superseded by a radio dish used as part of the Very Long Baseline Interferometry (VLBI) network that now determines the Earth rotation parameters.

He was a member of the International Astronomical Union (lAU), and head of the IAU Commission on Time.

== Legacy ==
Sollenberger has minor planet, 5367 Sollenberger, named after him.

== Personal life ==
Sollenberger retired to Miami and died on May 5, 1995, at 103 years old.
