= Original dance =

Segment in an ice dancing competition

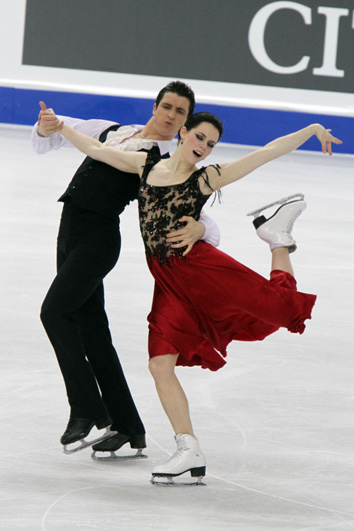
Tessa Virtue and Scott Moir perform their flamenco original dance, earning the highest recorded score, at the 2010 World Championships

The original dance (OD) was one of the programs performed by figure skaters in ice dance competitions, in which the ice dancers skated "a dance of their own creation to dance music they have selected for the designated rhythm(s)". It was normally the second of three programs in the competition, sandwiched between the compulsory dance (CD) and the free dance (FD). The rhythm(s) and type of music required for the OD changed every season, and were selected by the International Skating Union (ISU) before the start of the season. The ice dancers were free to choose their own music and choreography (within the specified constraints) and to create their own routines. They were judged on a set of required criteria, including skating skills and how well they interpreted the music and the rhythm.

The ISU voted in 2010 to discontinue the OD, along with the CD, and to introduce the short dance (SD) as a replacement. Accordingly, after the 2009–2010 season, the ice dance competition structure was changed and the original dance was removed from all ISU junior and senior level competitions.

== History ==
The original dance (OD) was added to ice dance competitions in 1967, when it became a replacement for one of the two compulsory dances. It was previously called the "original set pattern dance" (OSPD), but its name was simplified to the "original dance" in 1990. The OD remained the second competition segment, after the compulsory dance (CD) and before the free dance (FD), until the competition structure was changed prior to the 2010–2011 season. In the late 1920s, an original dance event was skated at the U.S. Figure Skating Championships, replacing the fourteenstep, one of the oldest dances in the sport, with the stipulation that it had to be skated to a fox trot.

The highest recorded OD score is 70.27 points, which was achieved by Canadian ice dancers Tessa Virtue and Scott Moir at the 2010 World Championships.

== Requirements ==
Ice dancers were able to select their own music for the OD and create an "original" routine, but they were required to use a set rhythm and type of music, which changed every season (as did the CD) and were chosen beforehand by the ISU. The OD needed to reflect the character of the music's rhythm and "be translated to the ice by demonstrating technical skill in steps and movements along with flow and the use of edges".

The five program components included in the OD were: skating skills; footwork and movement (particularly the transitions linking them); performance and/or execution of the program; choreography and composition of the program; and the interpretation and timing of the music. The judges also considered how well the competitors performed certain elements in the OD, such as dance spins, lifts, synchronized twizzles, and step sequences.

During the OD, apart from the mandatory step sequences, ice dancers were only permitted to cross the long axis of the ice surface once at each end of the rink, within 20 meters of the barrier. All rotations, turns, steps, and changes of hold were allowed, as long as they followed the music's rhythm. Interpretation of the rhythm was considered to be the most important aspect of the OD so, along with the timing, this was scored the highest. The OD had a time limit of two minutes and was worth 30% of the total score.

== Elimination ==
In 2010, the ISU voted to eliminate both the CD and the OD, and to restructure ice dance competitions to include a new short dance (SD) segment alongside the existing FD segment. Despite the anticipated change, the ISU published their OD rhythm/music choices for both junior and senior ice dance teams for the 2010–2011 season, "rhythms and dances of the 1950s, 1960s or 1970s". The OD was included in competitions for the last time in the 2009–2010 season, when the choice of rhythm/music for both juniors and seniors was "folk/country" or "any type of folk/country dance music or typical dance of the country".

== List of original dance rhythms by season ==
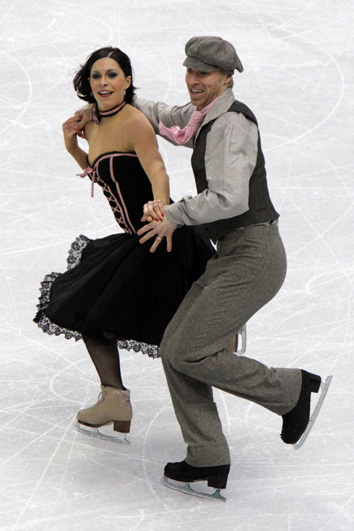
Isabelle Delobel and Olivier Schoenfelder perform their French-inspired original dance at the 2010 Olympics

The following is a list of senior level original dance rhythms.

Season	Rhythm
1971–1972	Samba
1972–1973	Waltz
1973–1974	Tango
1974–1975	Blues
1975–1976	Rhumba
1976–1977	March
1977–1978	Paso Doble
1978–1979	Waltz
1979–1980	Foxtrot
1980–1981	Cha Cha
1981–1982	Blues
1982–1983	Rock and Roll
1983–1984	Paso Doble
1984–1985	Quickstep
1985–1986	Polka
1986–1987	Viennese Waltz
1987–1988	Tango
1988–1989	Charleston
1989–1990	Samba
1990–1991	Blues
1991–1992	Polka
1992–1993	Viennese Waltz
1993–1994	Rhumba
1994–1995	Quickstep
1995–1996	Paso Doble
1996–1997	Tango
1997–1998	Jive
1998–1999	Waltz
1999–2000	Latin Combination: Merengue, Cha Cha, Samba, Mambo, Rumba
2000–2001	Charleston, Foxtrot, Quickstep, March
2001–2002	Tango, Flamenco, Paso Doble, Spanish Waltz
2002–2003	Memories of a Grand Ball: Waltz, Polka, March, Galop
2003–2004	Swing Combo: Jive, Boogie Woogie, Jitterbug, Rock'n'Roll, Blues
2004–2005	Foxtrot, Quickstep, Charleston
2005–2006	Latin Combination: Merengue, Cha Cha, Samba, Mambo, Rumba
2006–2007	Tango
2007–2008	Folk, Country
2008-2009	Rhythms of the 1920s, 1930s, and 1940s
2009–2010	Folk, Country
2010–2011	Rhythms and Dances of the 1950s, 1960s or 1970s

== Works cited ==
- Hines, James R. (2011). Historical Dictionary of Figure Skating. Lanham, Maryland: Scarecrow Press. ISBN 978-0-8108-6859-5.
- "The 2010 Official U.S. Figure Skating Rulebook" (PDF). U.S. Figure Skating. Colorado Springs, Colorado. 2009. Archived from the original (PDF) on 18 July 2018.
