= Competition elements in ice dance =

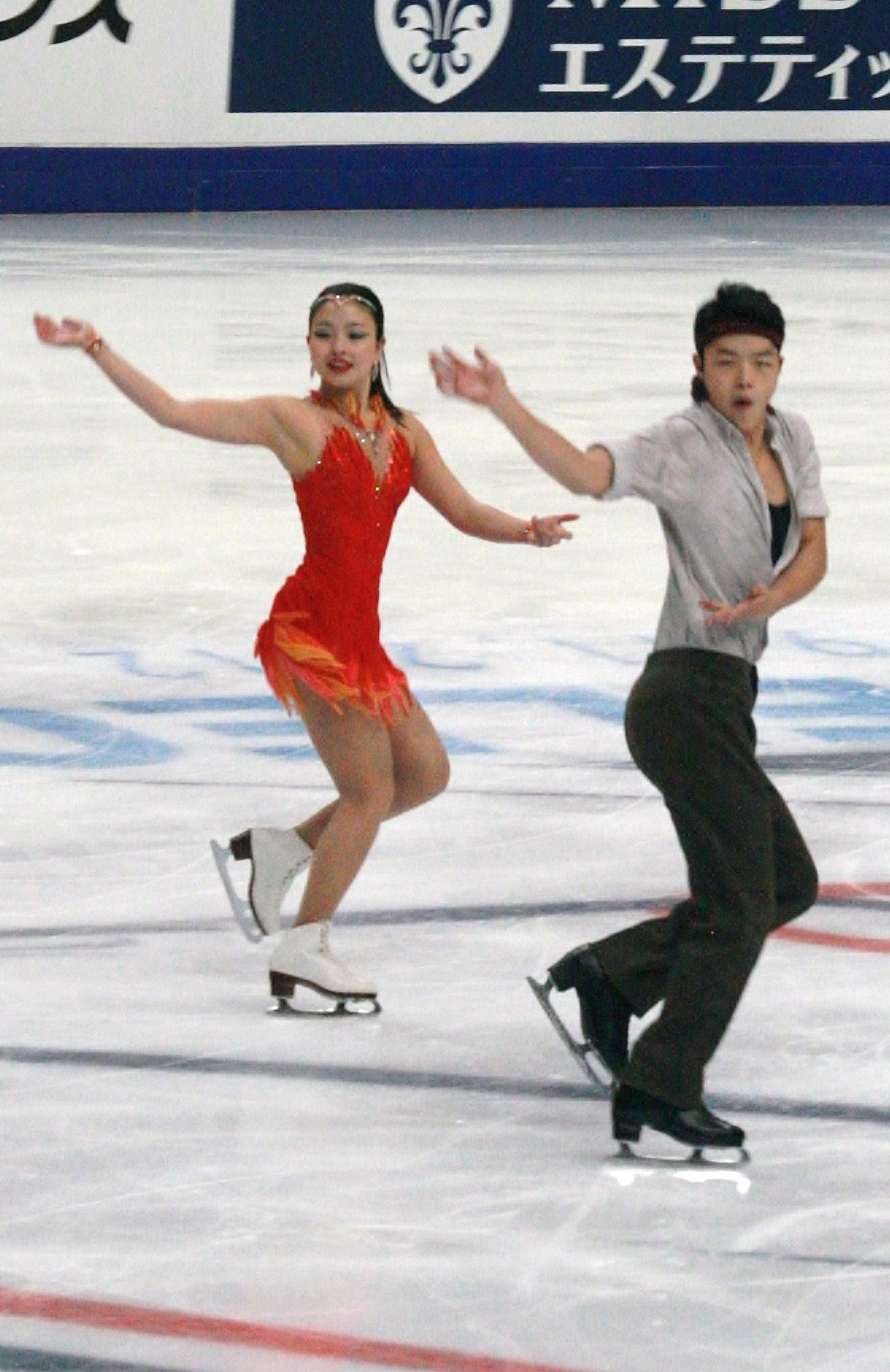
Maia Shibutani and Alex Shibutani performing a twizzle, a required element in ice dance

Ice dance, a discipline of figure skating, has required elements that make up a well-balanced rhythm dance program and free dance program, which must be performed during competitions. They include: the dance lift, the dance spin, the step sequence, turn sequences (which include twizzles and one-foot turns sequences), and choreographic elements. The elements must be performed in specific ways, as described by published communications by the International Skating Union (ISU), unless otherwise specified. The ISU has also provided a list of illegal movements.

== General requirements ==
The International Skating Union (ISU), the governing body that oversees figure skating, announces the list of required elements in a well-balanced rhythm dance program and free dance program, and each element's specific requirements, each year. The following elements may be included: the dance lift, the dance spin, the step sequence, turn sequences, choreographic elements, and, in the rhythm dance, pattern dance elements. As of the 2022-2023 season, senior ice dancers no longer had to perform a pattern dance in the RDs, but instead were required to execute a choreographic rhythm sequence.

Illegal movements in the rhythm dance, the free dance, and in the pattern dances include the following, including the introductory and concluding steps, unless otherwise stated by the ISU:

1. Sitting on the partner's head.
2. Standing on the partner's shoulder.
3. The lifted partner placed in an upside-down split pose, with a sustained angle of over 45 degrees between their thighs.
4. The lifting partner swinging the lifted partner around by holding only their skate(s), boot(s), and/or leg(s) with fully extended arm(s).
5. The lifting partner swinging the lifted partner around without the assistance of their hand(s) and/or arm(s) and the lifted partner holding only with their legs and/or feet around the lifting partner's neck.
6. The point of contact of the lifting hand(s) and/or arm(s) of the lifting partner with any part of the body of the lifted partner is sustained with the fully extended arm(s) higher than the lifting partner's head, although the supporting arm may be sustained and fully extended above the head.
7. Jumps of more than one revolution except during the jump entry and/or jump exit.
8. Lying on the ice.

The first six movements are permitted if they are not established and sustained, or if they are used only to change pose.

== Dance lifts ==
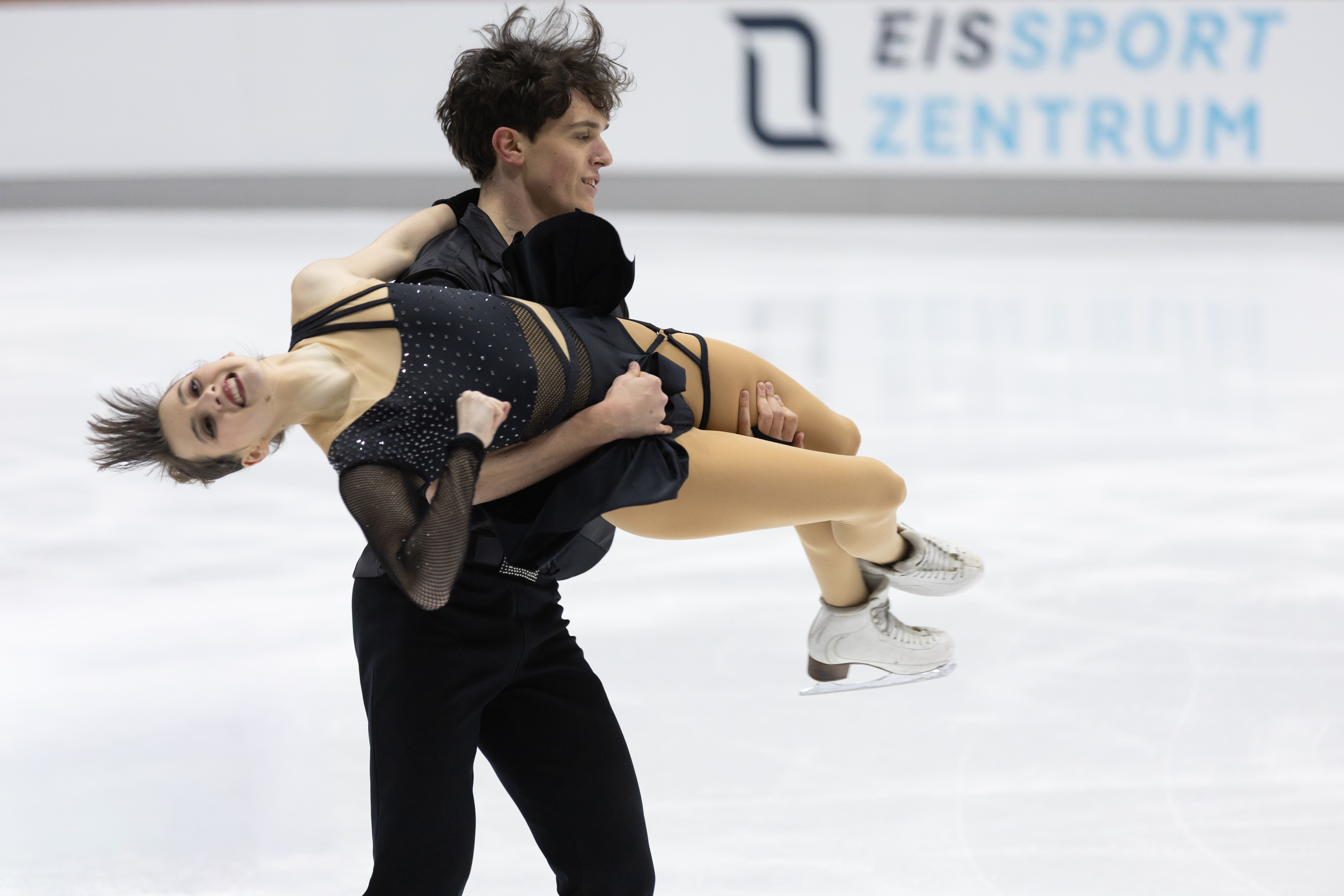
Lilia Schubert and Nikita Remeshevskiy from Germany performing an ice dance lift (2025)

The ISU defines dance lifts as "a movement in which one of the partners is elevated with active and/or passive assistance of the other partner to any permitted height, sustained there and set down on the ice". Lifts should be "performed in an elegant manner without obvious feats of strength and awkward and/or dignified actions and poses". They should enhance the music that the dancers choose. All rotations, positions, and changes of these positions are allowed. The minimum required length for a dance lift is three seconds.

After the judging system changed from the 6.0 system to the ISU Judging System (IJS), dance lifts became more "athletic, dramatic and exciting". American ice dancer Charlie White stated that lifts have become "increasingly difficult", requiring teams to, like pair skaters, work with acrobats to develop their lifts. According to former competitive dancer Pilar Bosley, ice dance lifts rotate faster than pair lifts. In order to maximize the difficulty of the lifts, dancers must hit certain patterns and positions, with differences in entering and exiting their lifts. They have also become more acrobatic, although they do not get as high as pair skating lifts, because ice dance lifts cannot be supported over the man's shoulder. Dance lifts have also become more dangerous, resulting in more falls and injuries.

There are two types of dance lifts: short lifts and combination lifts. There are four types of short lifts: the stationary lift, the straight-line lift, the Curve lift, and the Rotational lift. The stationary lift is done "on the spot", or at the stationary location, by the lifting partner, who may or may not be rotating at the time. A straight line lift is one in which the lifting partner is traveling in a straight line, in any position, on either one foot or two feet. A curve lift is one in which the lifting partner is traveling on one curve (or lobe), in any position, on either one foot or two feet. A rotational lift is one in which the lifting partner is rotating in one direction, either clockwise or counterclockwise, while traveling across the ice. There are three types of combination lifts: two Rotational lifts in different directions, two Curve lifts performed in a serpentine pattern, and two different types of short lifts performed together.

== Dance spins ==
The ISU defines a dance spin as "a spin skated by the Couple together in any hold". The ISU also states that the dance spin should be "performed on the spot around a common axis on one foot with or without change(s) of foot by one or both partners".

Dance spins have three basic positions. The upright position is done on one foot with the skating leg slightly bent or straight and with the upper body upright, bent to the side, or with an arched back. The sit position is done on one foot, with the "skating leg bent in a one-legged crouch position and free leg forward, to the side or back. The camel position is done on one foot, with "the skating leg straight or slightly bent and body bent forward and free leg extended or bent upward on a horizontal line or higher".

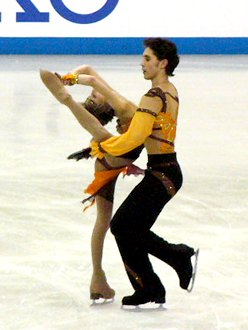
Jana Khokhlova and Sergei Novitski perform an upright/Biellmann spin

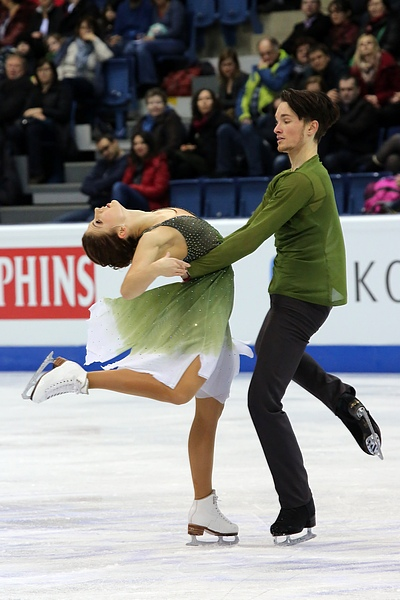
Cecilia Törn and Jussiville Partanen

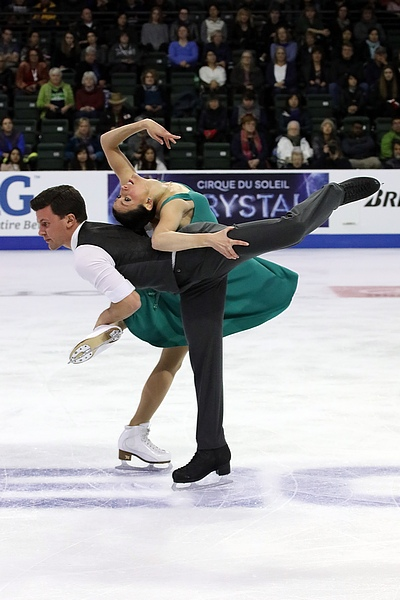
Charlène Guignard and Marco Fabbri

== Step sequences ==
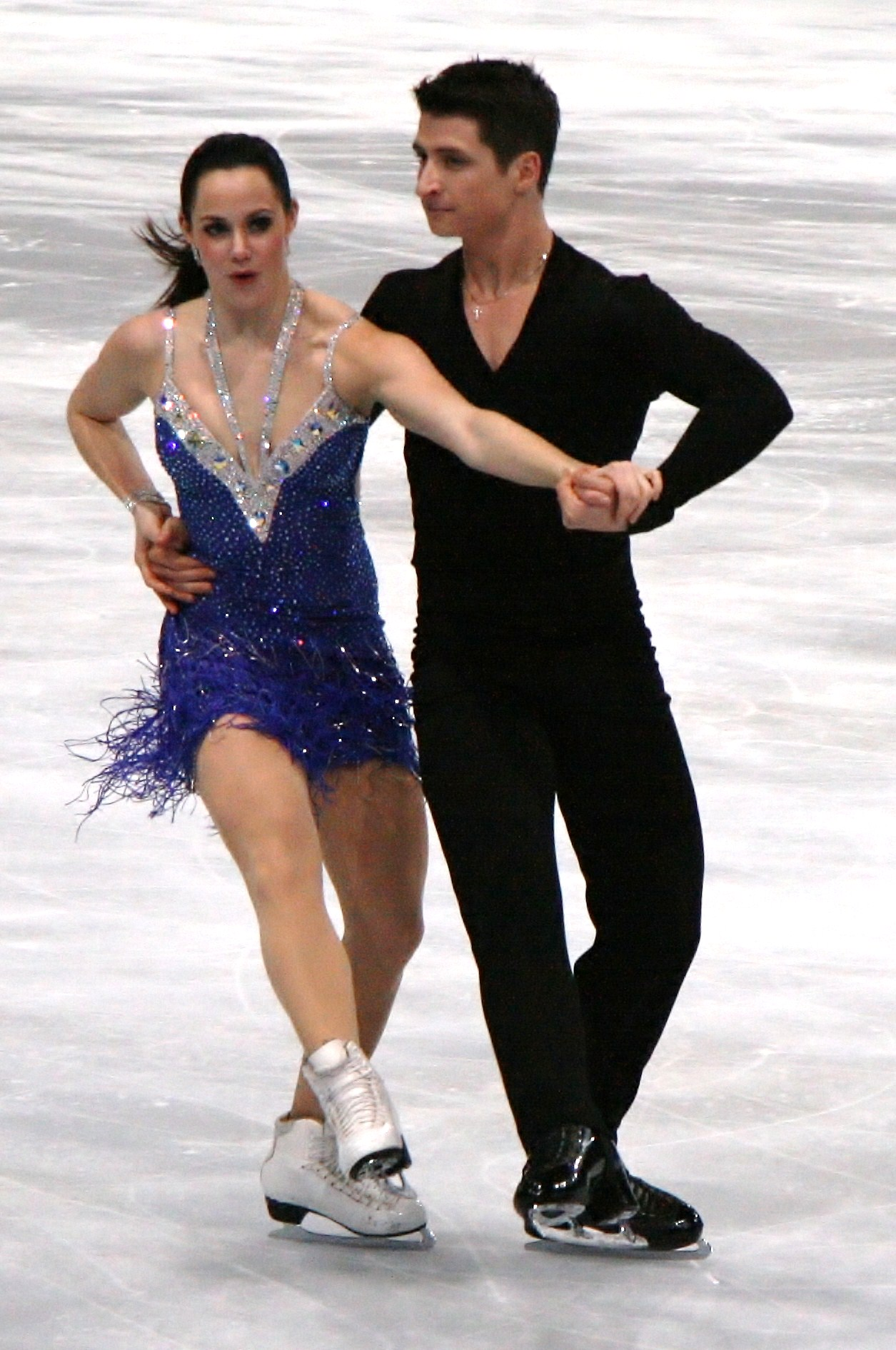
Tessa Virtue and Scott Moir perform part of a step sequence during a short program

The ISU defines a step sequence as "a series of prescribed or un-prescribed steps, turns and movements" in a rhythm dance or free dance. Step sequences have three divisions: types, groups, and styles.

There are two types of step sequences: not-touching or in hold. Not-touching step sequences must include matching and/or mirror footwork. Both ice dancers must skate as close to each other as possible, not more than two arm lengths apart, without touching. They can cross each other's tracing(s) and can switch from mirror to matching footwork, and vice versa, "unless otherwise specified" by the ISU. The distance between the partners "should generally not be more than two arm length apart, except for short distances when the partners are performing edges and turns in opposite directions". Step sequences in hold must be performed in any dance holds or any variation of dance holds, "unless otherwise specified" by the ISU. The ISU also states, about step sequences in hold, "Any separation to change a hold must not exceed one measure of music".

Types of step sequences are separated into three Groups. The first group (Group A) includes straight-line step sequences. There are two types of straight-line step sequences: midline, which is skated along the full length of the ice surface, on either its short or long axis; and diagonal, which is skated from corner to corner, as fully as possible. The second group (Group B) includes curved step sequences: circular, which can be skated in either a clockwise or anti-clockwise direction and must use the ice surface's full width; and serpentine, which can commence in either a clockwise or anti-clockwise direction and "progresses in three bold curves or in two bold curves (S-Shaped) and ends at the Long Axis of the opposite end of the rink, with the pattern utilizing the full width of the ice surface". The third group (Group C) includes partial step sequences, which are pattern dance-type step sequences and can be executed anywhere on the ice surface or as prescribed by the ISU.

Characteristics of the levels of step sequences are organized as styles of step sequences, are technical requirements, and are published yearly in an ISU communication.

== Turn sequences ==
Turn sequences are a required element in the rhythm dance and may be included in a well-balanced free dance program. Specific requirements for turn sequences are announced in an ISU communication each year. There are two types of turn sequences, a set of twizzles and a one-foot turns sequence. A set of twizzles can include two types. The first type is synchronized twizzles, a series of two twizzles for each partner, with up to four steps between them. The second type is sequential twizzles, a series of two twizzles for each partner, with up to one step between them. The ISU states that for each type, each twizzle "shall be at least one full rotation on one foot performed simultaneously (at the same time) by both partners". The one-foot turns sequence is "specified Turns performed on one foot by each partner simultaneously, in Hold or separately".

=== Twizzles ===
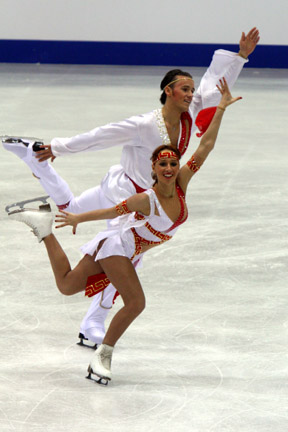
Kristina Gorshkova and Vitali Butikov perform a twizzle

The ISU defines a twizzle as "a traveling turn on one foot with one or more rotations, which is quickly rotated with a continuous (uninterrupted) action". It has also been defined as "a multirotational, one-foot turn that moves across the ice". Starting in the 2018–2019 season, dancers were judged individually on the execution of their twizzles; their individual points are combined for the team's final score for the element.

A skater's weight, when performing the twizzle, "remains on the skating foot with the free foot in any position during the turn then placed beside the skating foot to skate the next step". The twizzle has four types of entry edges: the Forward Inside, the Forward Outside, the Backward Inside, and the Backward Outside. Skaters can make twizzle-like motions, movements in which the skating foot completes less than a full turn and then a step forward while the body performs one full continuous rotation. A series of checked Three Turns does not constitute a twizzle because it is not a continuous action. If the traveling stops while the steps are being made, it is also not a twizzle; rather, it is a Pirouette, or solo spin.

== Choreographic elements ==
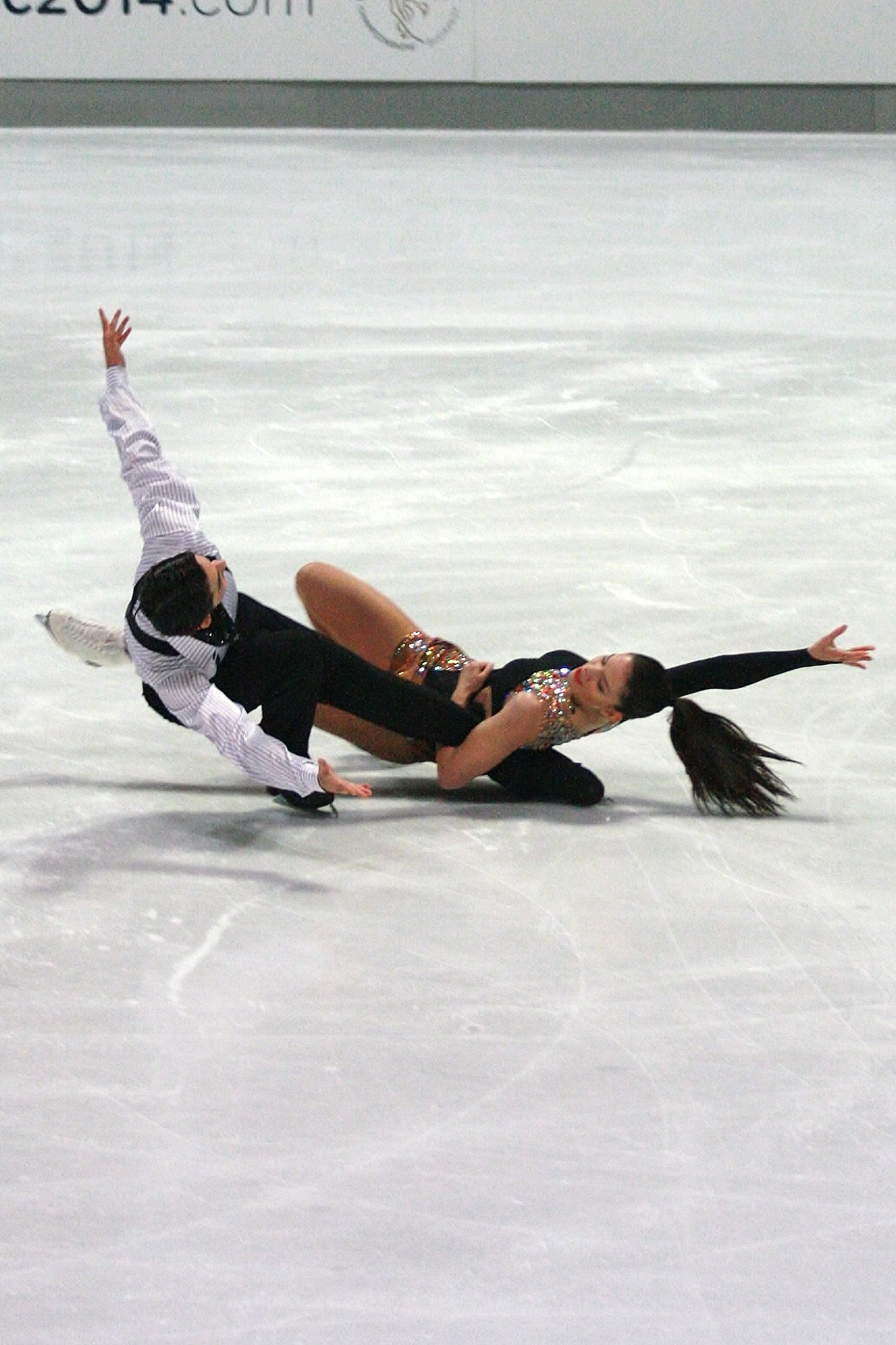
Alisa Agafonova and Alper Uçar perform a hydroblade, a choreographic element in ice dance

The ISU defines a choreographic element in ice dance as "a listed or unlisted movement or series of movement(s) as specified" by the ISU annually. Choreographic element(s) may be included in the rhythm dance and in a well-balanced free dance.

There are seven types of choreographic elements: the choreographic lift; the choreographic spinning movement; the choreographic assisted-jump/lifting movement; the choreographic twizzling movement; the choreographic hydroplaning movement; and the choreographic character step sequence.

Choreographic dance lifts, which must be done after all other required dance lifts are performed, must last at least three seconds, and must last up to 10 seconds.

Choreographic spinning movements are spinning movements, performed at any time during a program, in which both partners, in any hold they choose, perform at least three continuous rotations.

The choreographic assisted-jump movement is at least three assisted-jump movements performed continuously anywhere during the program. It must fulfill the following requirements: at least three of the same or different movements must be performed continuously; the assisted partner must be off the ice for less than three seconds; there can be no more than three steps in between each assisted jump movement; either partner can execute the assisted jump movement; and the assisting partner cannot rotate more than one rotation per each assisted-jump movement.

Twizzling choreographic movements are performed after the required set of twizzles and are composed of two parts. The first part must be executed simultaneously, have at least two continuous rotations, and both partners must travel, or as the ISU puts it, "cannot be on the spot". For the second part, at least one partner must skate at least two continuous rotations, with up to three steps between the first and second twizzling movement, and one or both partners can perform the movement on the spot, traveling, or a combination of both.

The choreographic hydroblading movement, which can be done in hold or not touching, can be performed at any time in a program. If the hydroblading movement is executed incorrectly, it will be considered a choreographic sliding movement. It must last by both partners at the same time for at least two seconds, although the beginning and end of the movement do not have to be performed at the same time. At least one blade by each partner must be on the ice for the duration of the movement.

Choreographic sliding movements, which can be performed at any time during the program, are movements in which both partners perform controlled sliding movements on the ice. These movements can be performed by both partners at the same time and on any part of the body, and the beginning and end of the movement do not have to be performed at the same time. The movements can be in hold or not-touching, or a combination of both, and can rotate. If the partners perform controlled sliding on two knees or any other part of the body, it will not be counted as a fall or illegal element, but if the partners finish the movement as a stop or by sitting or lying on the ice, it will be considered a fall or illegal movement. If both partners perform a basic lunge movement at the same time, it is not considered a choreographic sliding movement.

The choreographic character step sequence, which can be performed at any time during the program, can be executed in any of the following patterns: diagonally (performed from one corner of the rink to the opposite corner), and either along the rink's long axis or short axis (performed from one barrier to its opposite barrier). This movement can be circular, which is defined as "starting from the long barrier at the Short Axis, crossing the long axis on each side of the short axis and completing the circle at the starting barrier". The barrier requirement is fulfilled when at least one partner is not over two meters from each barrier. The sequence can be executed either in hold or not touching, and touching the barrier at the start or end of the sequence is also allowed.

== Works cited ==
- "Communication No. 2716: Ice Dance Requirements for Technical Rules with Ongoing Validity" (PDF). International Skating Union. Lausanne, Switzerland. 5 June 2025. Archived (PDF) from the original on 19 August 2025.
- "Special Regulations & Technical Rules – Single & Pair Skating and Ice Dance 2024" (PDF). International Skating Union. June 2024. Archived (PDF) from the original on 9 November 2024.
