= Free dance (ice dance) =

Segment in an ice dancing competition

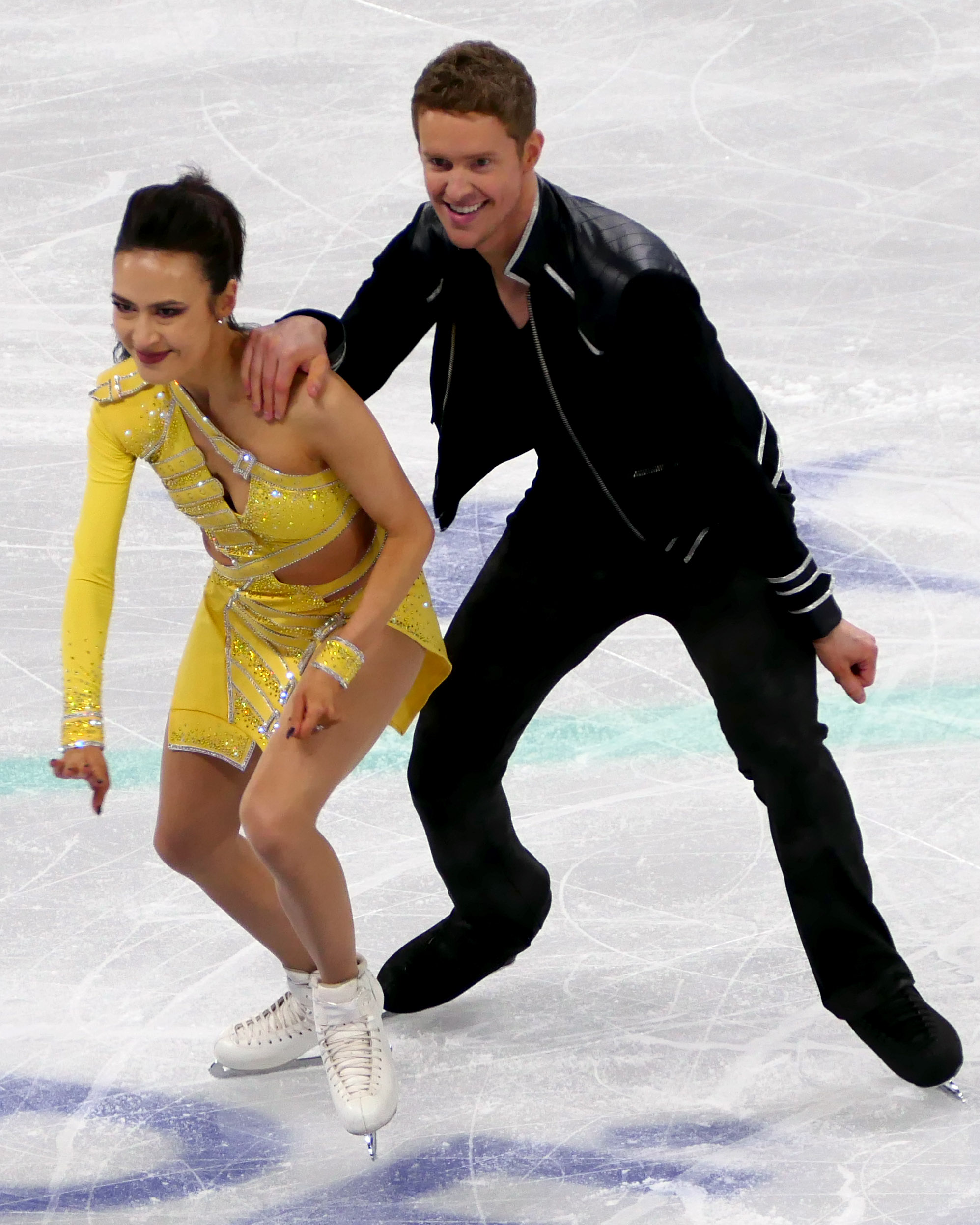
Madison Chock and Evan Bates at the 2024 World Figure Skating Championships

The free dance (FD) is a segment of an ice dance competition, the second contested. It follows the rhythm dance (RD). Skaters perform "a creative dance program blending dance steps and movements expressing the character/rhythm(s) of the dance music chosen by the couple". American ice dancers Madison Chock and Evan Bates hold the highest recorded international FD score of 138.41 points.

== Background ==
The free dance (FD) takes place after the rhythm dance in all junior and senior ice dance competitions. The International Skating Union (ISU), the body that oversees figure skating, defines the FD as "the skating by the couple of a creative dance program blending dance steps and movements expressing the character/rhythm(s) of the dance music chosen by the couple". The FD must have combinations of new or known dance steps and movements, as well as required elements. The program must "utilize the full ice surface," and be well-balanced. It must contain required combinations of elements (spins, lifts, steps, and movements), and choreography that express both the characters of the competitors and the music chosen by them. It must also display the skaters' "excellent skating technique" and creativity in expression, concept, and arrangement. The FD's choreography must reflect the music's accents, nuances, and dance character, and the ice dancers must "skate primarily in time to the rhythmic beat of the music and not to the melody alone". For senior ice dancers, the FD must have a duration of four minutes; for juniors, 3.5 minutes.

American ice dancers Madison Chock and Evan Bates hold the highest RD score of 93.91, which they achieved at the World Team Trophy in 2023. (Note: After the 2018–2019 season, due to the change in grade of execution scores from −3 to +3 to −5 to +5, all statistics started from zero and all previous scores were listed as "historical".)

== Required elements ==
The ISU announces the specific requirements for the FD each year. For example, the ISU published the rules for the 2025–26 season in May 2025. The following elements are required: the Dance Lift, the Dance Spin, the Step Sequence, Synchronized Twizzles, and Choreographic Elements.

Elements	Junior	Senior
Dance lift	Two different types of short lifts, up to eight seconds each or one combination lift, up to 13 seconds in total.	Three different types of short lifts, up to eight seconds or one short lift and one combination lift, up to 13 seconds in total.
Dance lift	The lifted partner's difficult pose or change of pose in the FD must be different from the same kind of short lift in the RD or part of the same kind of lift in the combination lift. If the lifted partner's difficult pose or change of pose is repeated in the same kind of lift, it is considered a simple pose and/or a change of pose in the FD.	The lifted partner's difficult pose or change of pose in the FD must be different from the same kind of short lift in the RD or part of the same kind of lift in the combination lift. If the difficult pose or change of pose is repeated in the same kind of lift, it will be considered as a simple pose and/or change of pose.
Dance spin	One dance spin (spin or combination spin) A dance spin is defined as a "spin skated by the Couple together in any hold" and must be "performed on the spot around a common axis on one foot with or without change(s) of foot by one or both partners.	
Straight line or Curve types of Step Sequences	One Step Sequence in Hold Its pattern must maintain the integrity or basic shape of the chosen pattern. Stops, loops, Retrogression, and separations of more than two arms length and/or exceeding five seconds are not permitted. A hand-in-hand hold with fully extended arms cannot be established. The pattern of the Step Sequence must maintain the integrity or basic shape of the chosen pattern. If the pattern is chosen as a Choreographic Element, it must be a different shape from the pattern of the Choreographic Step. One One-Foot Step Sequence, Not-Touching Difficult turns must be performed on one foot by each partner, and must be started with the first difficult turn at the same time. Additional difficult turns do not have to be executed simultaneously.	
Synchronized twizzles	One set of synchronized twizzles At least two twizzles for each partner, with a minimum of two steps and up to four steps between first and second twizzles. (Each push and/or transfer of weight while on two feet between twizzles is considered as a step.) Partners must be in contact at some point between the first and second twizzles.	
Choreographic elements	Two different Choreographic elements chosen from: Choreographic Lift; Choreographic Spinning Movement; Choreographic Hydroblading Movement; Choreographic Assisted Jump/Lifting Movement; Choreographic Twizzling Movement; Choreographic Sliding Movement; Choreographic Character Step Sequence	Three different Choreographic elements, chosen from: Choreographic Jump/Lifting Movement; Choreographic Spinning Movement; Choreographic Hydroblading Movement; Choreographic Lift; Choreographic Twizzling Movement; Choreographic Sliding Movement; Choreographic Character Step Sequence

== Works cited ==
- "Communication No. 2704: Ice Dance: Requirements for Technical Rules season 2025/26" (PDF). International Skating Union. 8 August 2025. Archived (PDF) from the original on 13 August 2025.
- "Special Regulations & Technical Rules – Single & Pair Skating and Ice Dance 2024" (PDF). International Skating Union. June 2024. Archived (PDF) from the original on 9 November 2024.
