= Step sequence =

Figure skating element

A step sequence is a required element in all four disciplines of figure skating: men's single skating, women's single skating, pair skating, and ice dance. Step sequences have been defined as "steps and turns in a pattern on the ice". Skaters earn the most points in step sequences by performing steps and movements with "flair and personality", by turning in both directions, by using one foot and then the other, and by including up and down movements.

Step sequences in pair skating should be performed "together or close together". Step sequences are required in the short programs, as prescribed by the ISU, for both senior and junior pairs teams, but are not required for their free skates. The step sequence must be "visible and identifiable", in any shape they like (oval, circle, straight line, serpentine, or similar shapes), over the full ice surface. The ISU also defines a step sequence in ice dance as "a series of prescribed or unprescribed steps, turns and movements in a Rhythm Dance or a Free Dance". Step sequences in ice dance have three divisions: types, groups, and styles.

== Background ==
A step sequence is a required element in all disciplines of figure skating, single skating, pair skating, and ice dance. Step sequences have been defined as "steps and turns in a pattern on the ice". The International Skating Union (ISU), the organization that oversees figure skating, requires that all step sequences be performed "according to the character of the music"; short stops in accordance with the music are also allowed. There is no longer a prescribed pattern for step sequences, but skaters must fully use the ice surface. The turns and steps they perform must be difficult and balanced in their distribution. None of the turns and steps is counted more than twice.

Skaters earn the most points in step sequences by performing steps and movements with "flair and personality", by turning in both directions, by using one foot and then the other, and by including up and down movements.

There are three feature levels in step sequences; the higher the feature, the more points skaters earn. Level 1 (minimum variety) must include at least five difficult turns and steps and at least two difficult turns and steps must be executed. Level 2 (simple variety) must include at least seven difficult turns and steps. Level 3 (variety) must include at least nine difficult turns and steps. Level 4 (complexity), which does not apply to pairs skaters, must include at least eleven difficult turns and steps.

Skaters must exhibit "two combinations of 3 difficult turns on different feet executed with continuous flow within the sequence". The ISU also states, "Only one difficult turn may be repeated in the two combinations", adding that "only the first combination attempted on each foot can be counted" in the scores. Additionally, skaters must execute full-body rotations in both directions, left and right.

The ISU differentiates between turns and steps and difficult turns and steps, which must be executed on clean edges. Turns include twizzles, brackets, loops, counters, rockers, and three turns. Steps include toe steps, chasses, mohawks, change of edge steps, and cross rolls. Difficult turns and steps include twizzles, brackets, loops, counters, rockers, and choctaws. If a turn is "jumped", it is not counted in the skaters' scores, although as of 2022, skaters could include single jumps in their step sequences as choreographic elements without incurring a penalty.

=== Gallery of turns used in step sequences ===
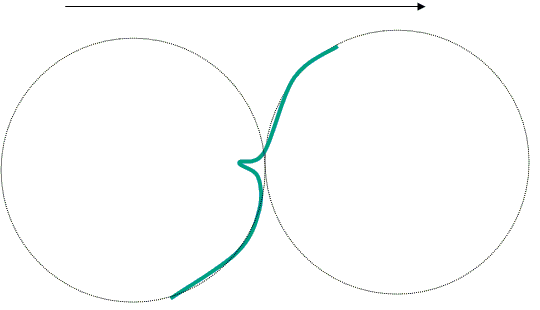
Rocker turn

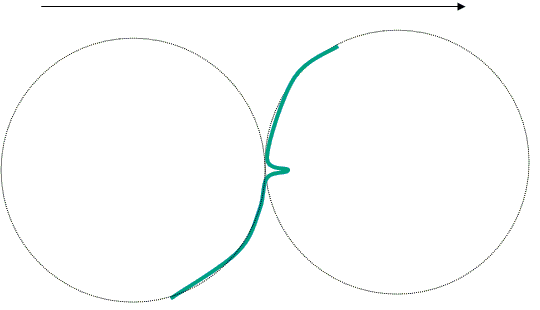
Counter turn

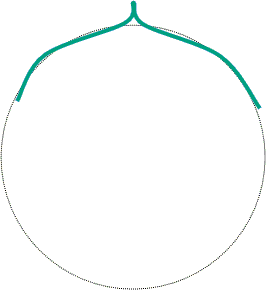
Bracket turn

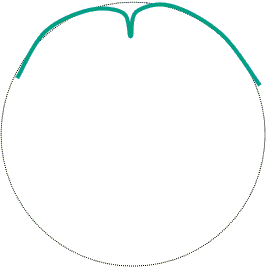
Three-turn

== Single skating ==
Both junior and senior single skaters must include at most one step sequence in their short programs; senior skaters must include a step sequence in their free skating programs. As of 2022, junior skaters were no longer required to include a step sequence in their free skates; instead, they had to include a choreographic sequence because ISU officials wanted them to focus more on their program components.

If a step sequence is barely visible or too short, it does not fulfill the step sequence requirements. Unlisted jumps with any number of revolutions and listed jumps with a maximum of one revolution can be included in the step sequence without penalties. If a listed jump performed during a step sequence in the short program has more than one revolution, the judges will penalize this by reducing the GOE by 1. However, a listed jump with more than one revolution performed during the step sequence of the free skate will be identified and counted as its own element. A twizzle must have at least two revolutions to count in the skater's score. (Note: See "Communication No. 2788" for a list of examples of correct and incorrect combinations of turns in a step sequence.)

== Pair skating ==
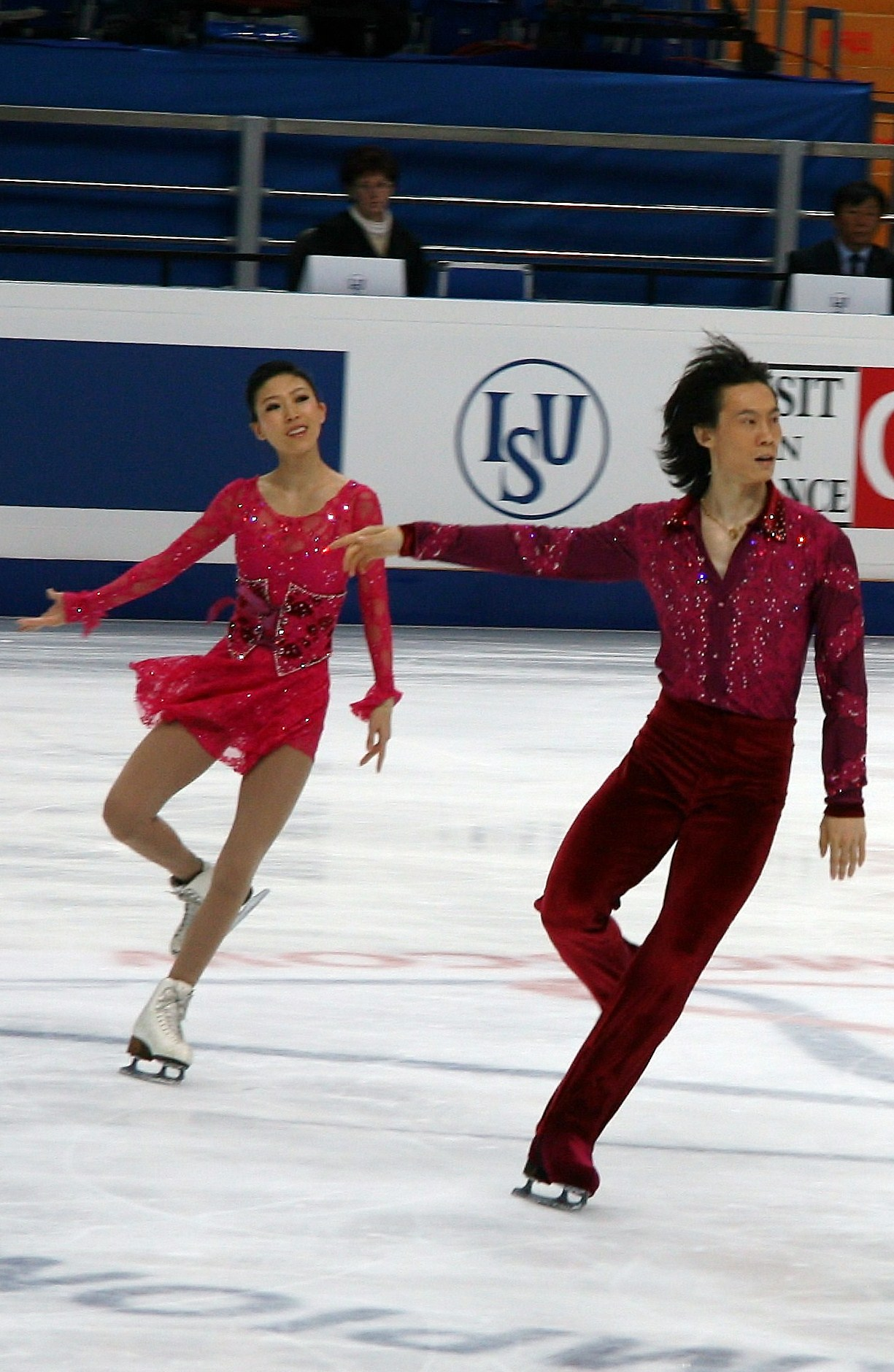
Chinese pair skaters Pang Qing and Tong Jian (2011), performing a twizzle

Step sequences in pair skating should be performed "together or close together" and must be "executed according to the character of the music". Step sequences must be a part of the short program, but there is no step sequence in the free skate. The step sequence must be "visible and identifiable", in any shape they like (oval, circle, straight line, serpentine, or a similar shape). Step sequences can include any unlisted jump, regardless of the number of revolutions are allowed. All turns and steps must have variety. The ISU defines variety as at least nine difficult turns and steps executed by both partners.

Pair teams can increase the levels of their step sequences by rotating in either direction, the left and the right, with "full body rotation covering at least 1/3 of the pattern in total for each rotational direction". Levels are also increased by the use of body movements for at least 1/3 of the pattern they skate, and by using two different combinations of three difficult turns by both partners, although one turn must be performed while in a hold, and only the first two combinations are counted. Turns and steps must be balanced "in their distribution" throughout the step sequence, and "the workload between both partners must be even".

More points are awarded to teams when they change places or holds, or when they perform difficult skating moves together. Teams also earn more points for the following: they execute rotations to either the right or the left, "with full body rotation covering at least one-third of the pattern in total for each rotational direction". (Note: "Full body rotations" are defined as having one complete rotation, not turning half a revolution back and forth.) Both partners must execute the combinations of difficult turns at the same time, with continuous flow throughout the step sequence and at least one turn performed while in a hold. They do not have to execute the same kind of turns, but the free foot must not touch the ice. Three turns, changes of edges, jumps and/or hops, and changes of feet are not allowed, and "at least one turn in the combination must be of a different type than the others". The exit edge of a turn is the entry edge of the next turn they execute. Unlisted jumps, no matter the number of revolutions, can be included in a step sequence and receive no deduction.

== Ice dance ==
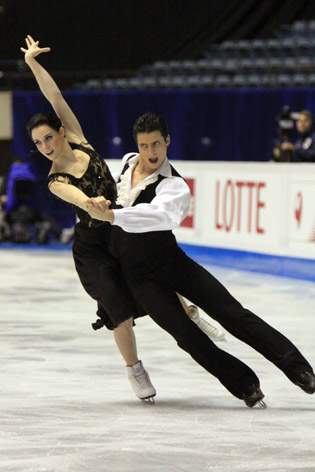
Tessa Virtue and Scott Moir (2009) demonstrating an ice dance hold

The ISU defines a step sequence in ice dance as "a series of prescribed or un-prescribed steps, turns and movements in a Rhythm Dance or a Free Dance". Step sequences have three divisions: types, groups, and styles.

There are two types of step sequences: not-touching or in hold. Not-touching step sequences must include matching and/or mirror footwork; both ice dancers must skate as close to each other as possible, not more than two arm lengths apart, without touching, except when skating turns and edges in opposite directions over short distances. The dancers can switch between mirror and matching footwork, and vice versa, and they can cross each other's tracings (marks made in the ice by the skates). Step sequences in hold must be performed in any dance holds, or any variation of dance holds, and must not last over one measure of music.

Types of step sequences are separated into four Groups, based on their difficulty. Group A includes straight line step sequences: the midline performed along the ice surface's full length on its long axis; and the diagonal, which is performed from corner to corner, as fully as possible. Group B includes three curved step sequences. The circular, which is performed on the rink's entire width, on its short axis, can be skated either clockwise or counterclockwise. The serpentine, which must be performed along the full width of the rink, can be done in either a clockwise or counterclockwise direction at the rink's long axis, at one end, and then progresses in either two or three S-shaped bold curves, ending up at the other end of the rink. Group C consists of the pattern dance type step sequence, which can be done anywhere on the ice or as prescribed by the ISU. The ISU describes and announces any variation of combination of Groups or the creation of other groups in an ISU Communication.

The ISU states the following about styles of step sequences: "Characteristics of Levels of step sequences, organized as styles, are technical requirements with ongoing validity and are published in an ISU Communication".

== Works cited ==
- "ISU Technical Panel Handbook Pair Skating 2025-2026" (PDF). International Skating Union. 25 July 2025. Archived (PDF) from the original on 12 August 2025.
- "ISU Technical Panel Handbook Single Skating 2025-2026" (PDF). International Skating Union. 25 July 2025. Archived (PDF) from the original on 12 August 2025.
- "Special Regulations & Technical Rules – Single & Pair Skating and Ice Dance 2024" (PDF). International Skating Union. June 2024. Archived (PDF) from the original on 9 November 2024.
