= Twizzle =

Figure skating element

Figure skating element
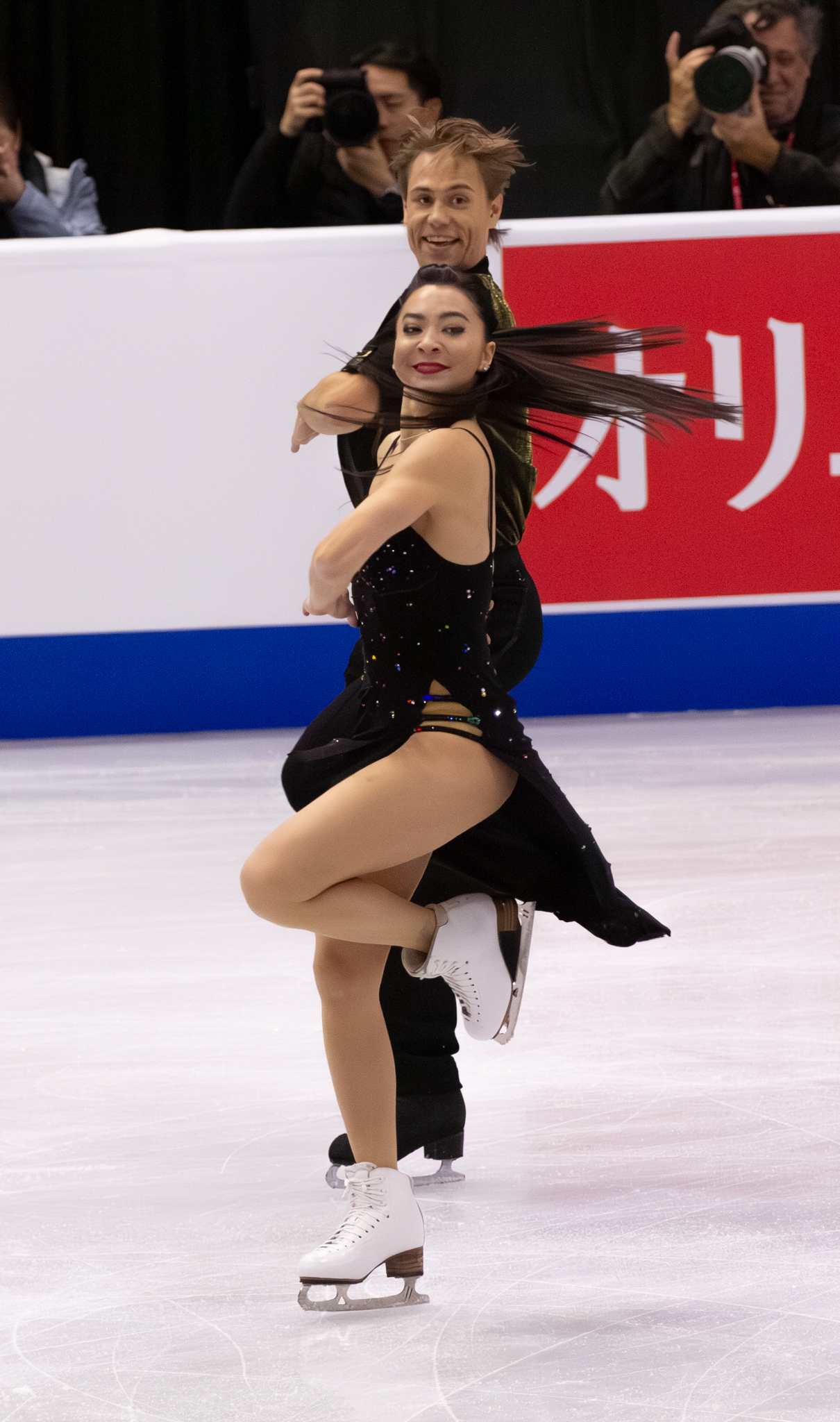
- Element name: Twizzle
- Scoring abbreviation: SyTw in the RD, SeTw in the FD

A twizzle is "a multirotational, one-foot turn that moves across the ice" in the sport of figure skating. The International Skating Union (ISU) defines a twizzle as "a traveling turn on one foot with one or more rotations which is quickly rotated with a continuous (uninterrupted) action". It is most often performed in ice dance, although single skaters and pair skaters also perform the element. Twizzles have been called "the quads of ice dance" because like quadruple jumps in other skating disciplines, twizzles are risky and technically demanding.

== Background ==
A twizzle is "a multirotational, one-foot turn that moves across the ice" in the sport of figure skating. It is a difficult turn in single skating. The International Skating Union (ISU), the governing body of figure skating, defines a twizzle as "a traveling turn on one foot with one or more rotations which is quickly rotated with a continuous (uninterrupted) action". A spin, by comparison, is a stationary, multi-rotational turn. Twizzle sequences, when executed well, are often the highlight of ice dance programs. A set of synchronized twizzles is a series of two twizzles for each partner, with up to four steps between each twizzle. A set of sequential twizzles is a series of two twizzles for each partner, with up to one step between each twizzle. For both a set of synchronized twizzles and a set of sequential twizzles, each twizzle should be at least one full rotation on one foot performed at the same time by both partners. American ice dancer Alex Shibutani calls twizzles "the quads of ice dance" because, like quadruple jumps in other disciplines, twizzles, which appear most often in ice dance programs, are risky and technically demanding.

There are four types of entry edges for twizzles: the forward inside, the forward outside, the backward inside, and the backward outside. A twizzle-like motion is a motion in which the skating foot executes less than a full turn, followed by a step forward, while the body performs one full continuous motion. A series of three-turn steps does not constitute a twizzle because they do not constitute a continuous action. If the skater stops traveling during the action, it is deemed a solo spin (or pirouette) and not counted as a twizzle.

== Execution ==
Twizzles, like steps, must be executed on clean edges. In a twizzle, the skater's weight is on the skating foot, with the free foot in any position during the turn, and then placed beside the skating foot to skate the next step. According to American ice dancer Colin McManus, the finesse required in mastering the twizzle makes it "very easy to run into issues like putting your foot down or hitting your toe pick". According to Shibutani, high-quality twizzles are performed when skaters focus on gathering speed as they enter a twizzle sequence, which provides enough directional force to continue rotating for as long as the choreography demands, and that muscle memory should carry them through the rest of the sequence. Shibutani reported that strong teams are able to adjust, make self-corrections, and follow what their partners are doing. He also said that there is "no room for mental errors at all" when executing a twizzle.

When ice dancers perform twizzles too slowly, trip while traveling across the ice, or fall out of sync with each other, it can ruin the flow of a program and "deflate the energy in the arena". According to Shibutani, practice, relying on muscle memory, and a good partnership are the keys to performing successful twizzle sequences. He said, about him and his long-time partner and sibling Maia Shibutani, "Hopefully, we’re rotating so fast that we can’t really see each other and it’s just kind of a feel thing". American ice dancer Meryl Davis reported, when speaking about how detailed and exact the synchronization is in the execution of twizzles, that she and her partner Charlie White knew the placement of each other's feet based on the sounds their blades made on the ice. Maia Shibutani stated that partners need to have strong individual skating skills and that staying in the moment is important because when skaters lose focus and think too far ahead, "then you're finished".

== Gallery ==
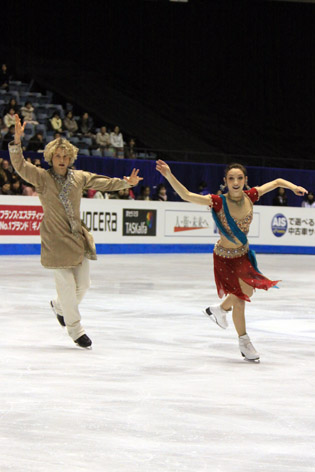
Meryl Davis and Charlie White, 2009

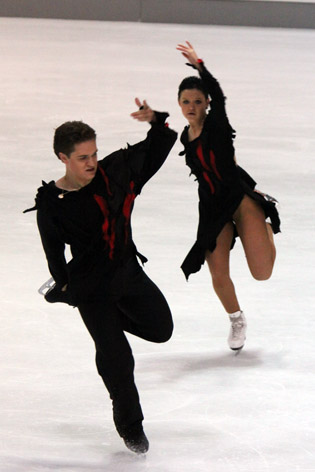
Alexandra Zaretski and Roman Zaretski, 2009

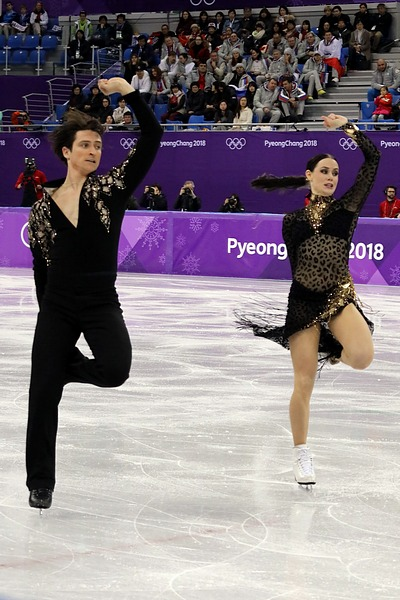
Tessa Virtue and Scott Moir, 2018

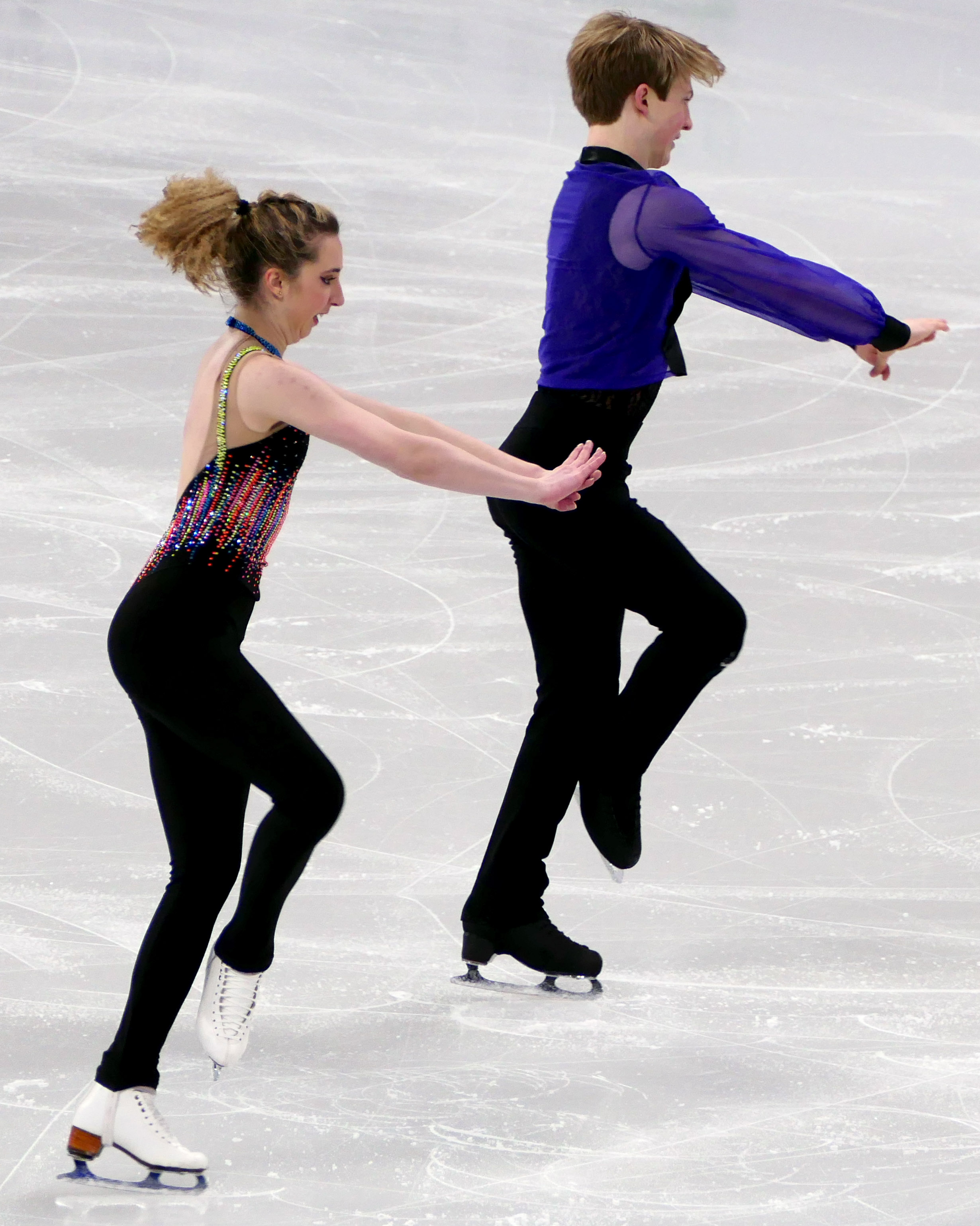
Emily Bratti and Ian Somerville, 2024

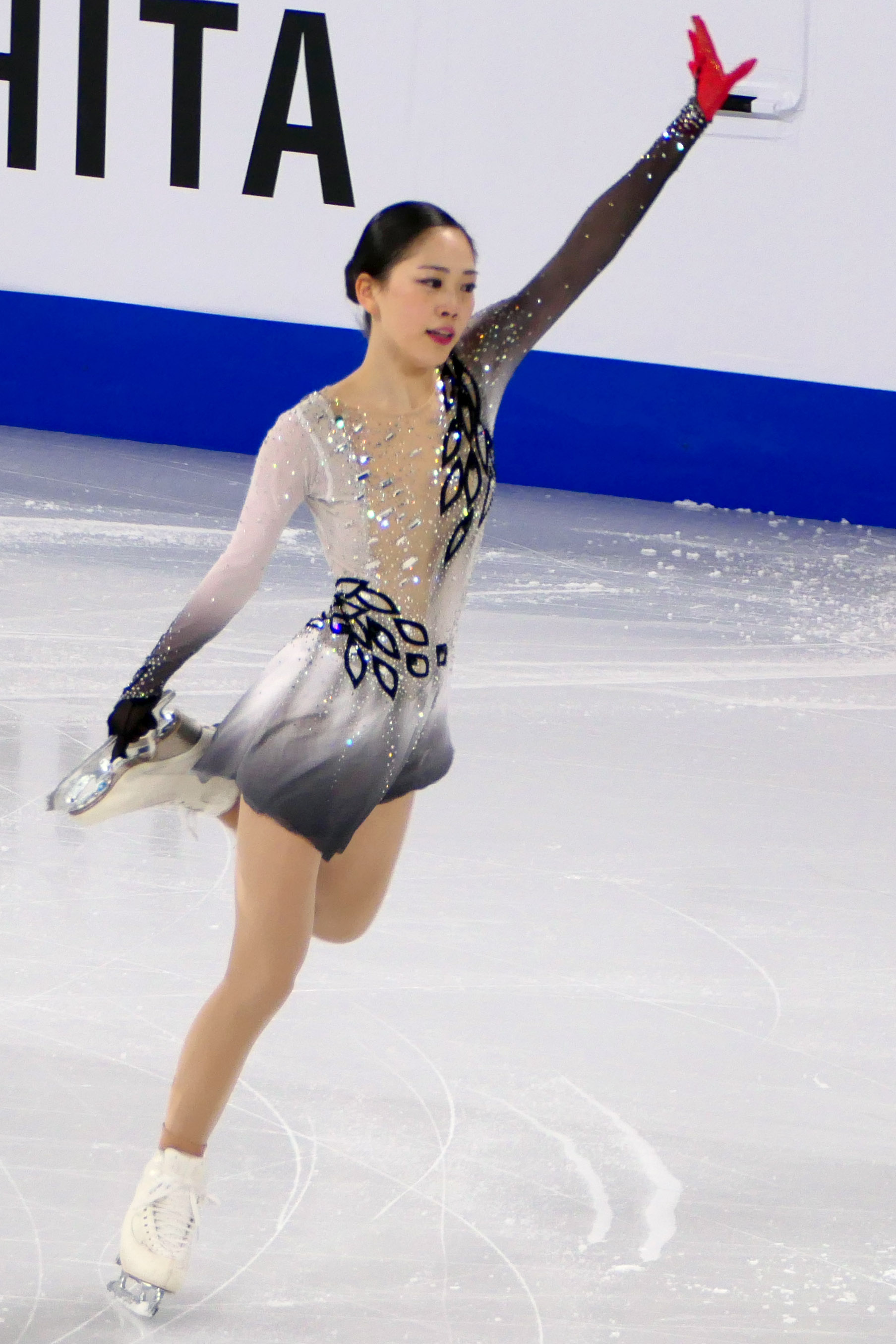
Hana Yoshida, 2024

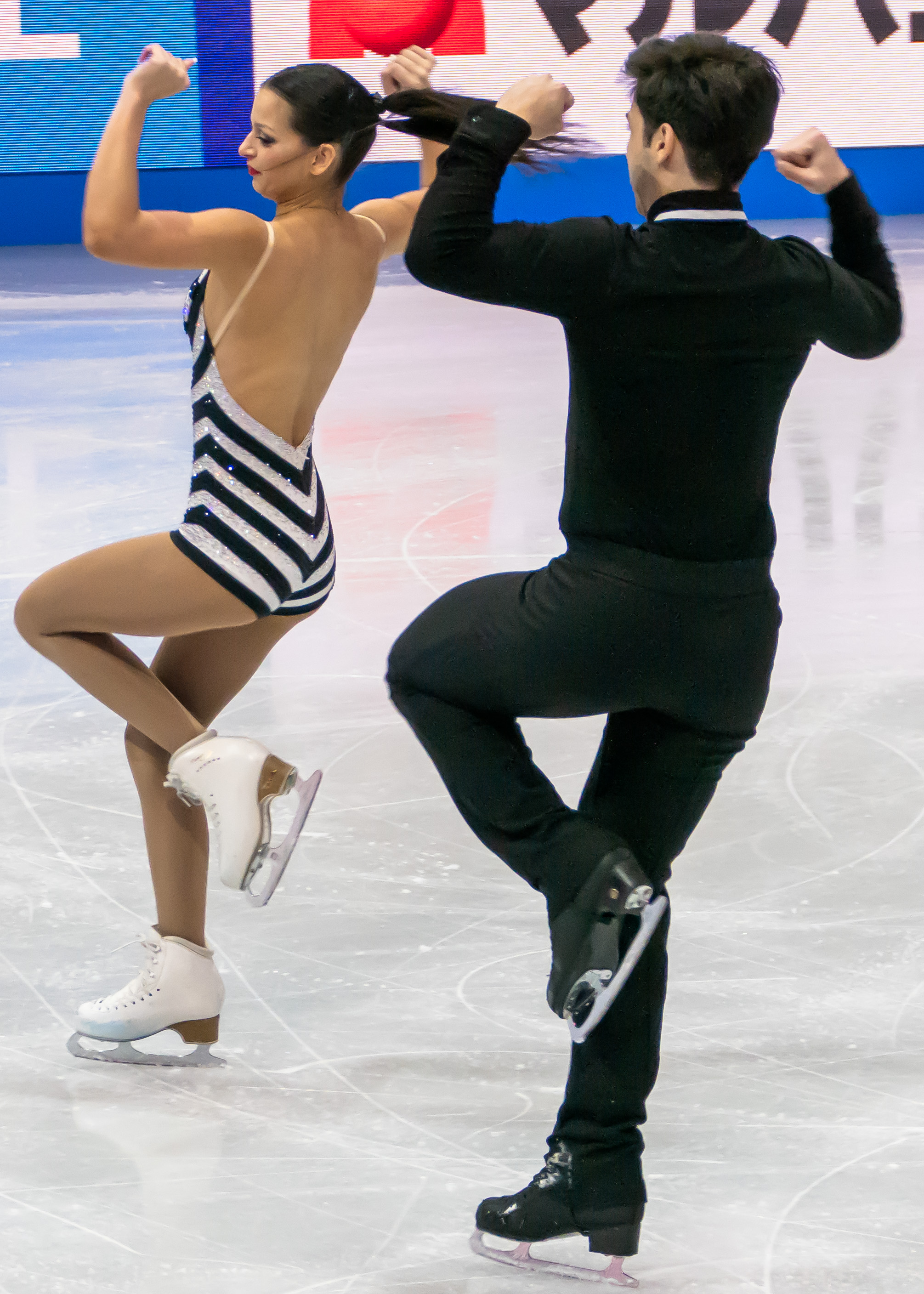
Katarina Delcamp and Berk Akalin, 2025

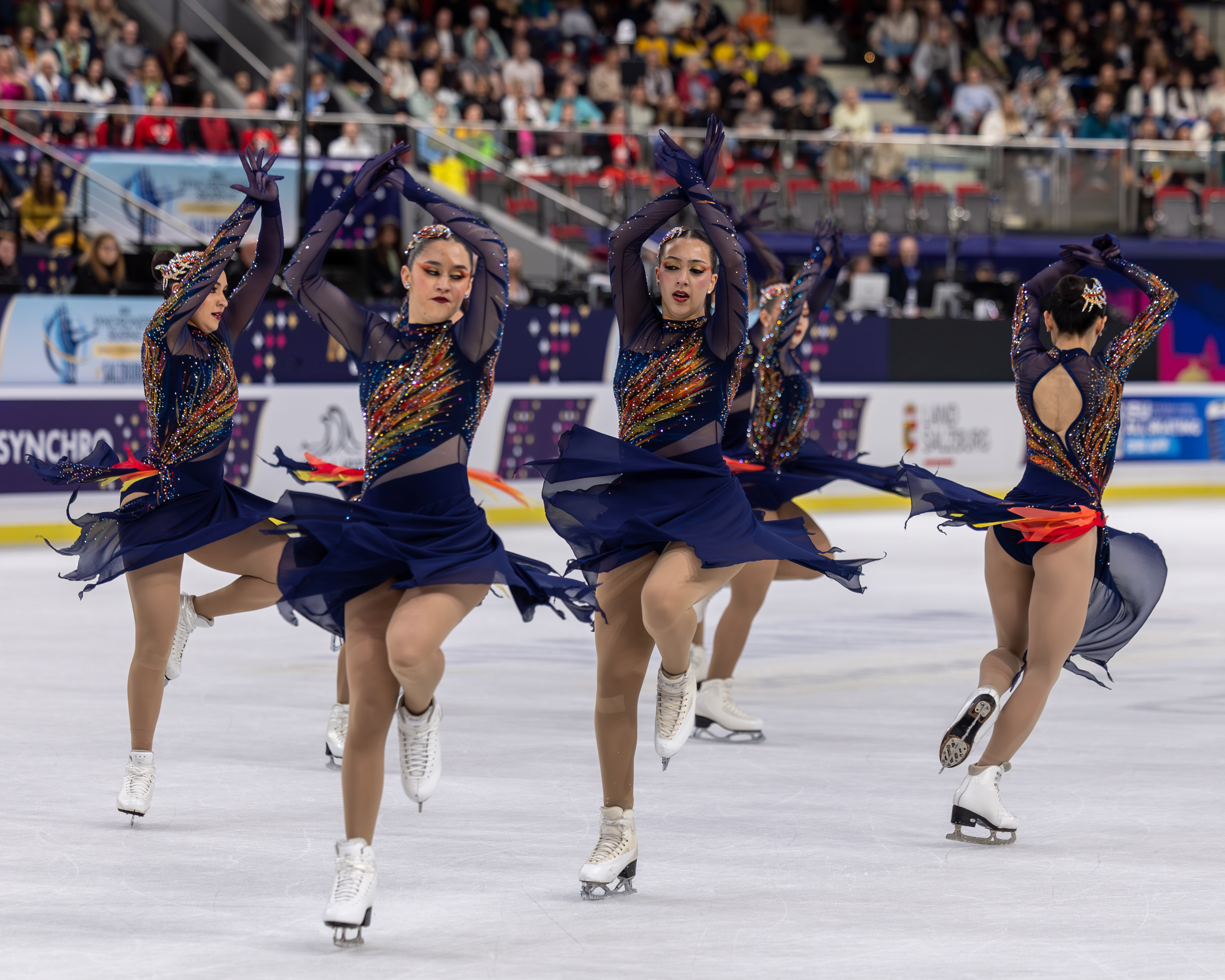
Synchronized skating, 2026

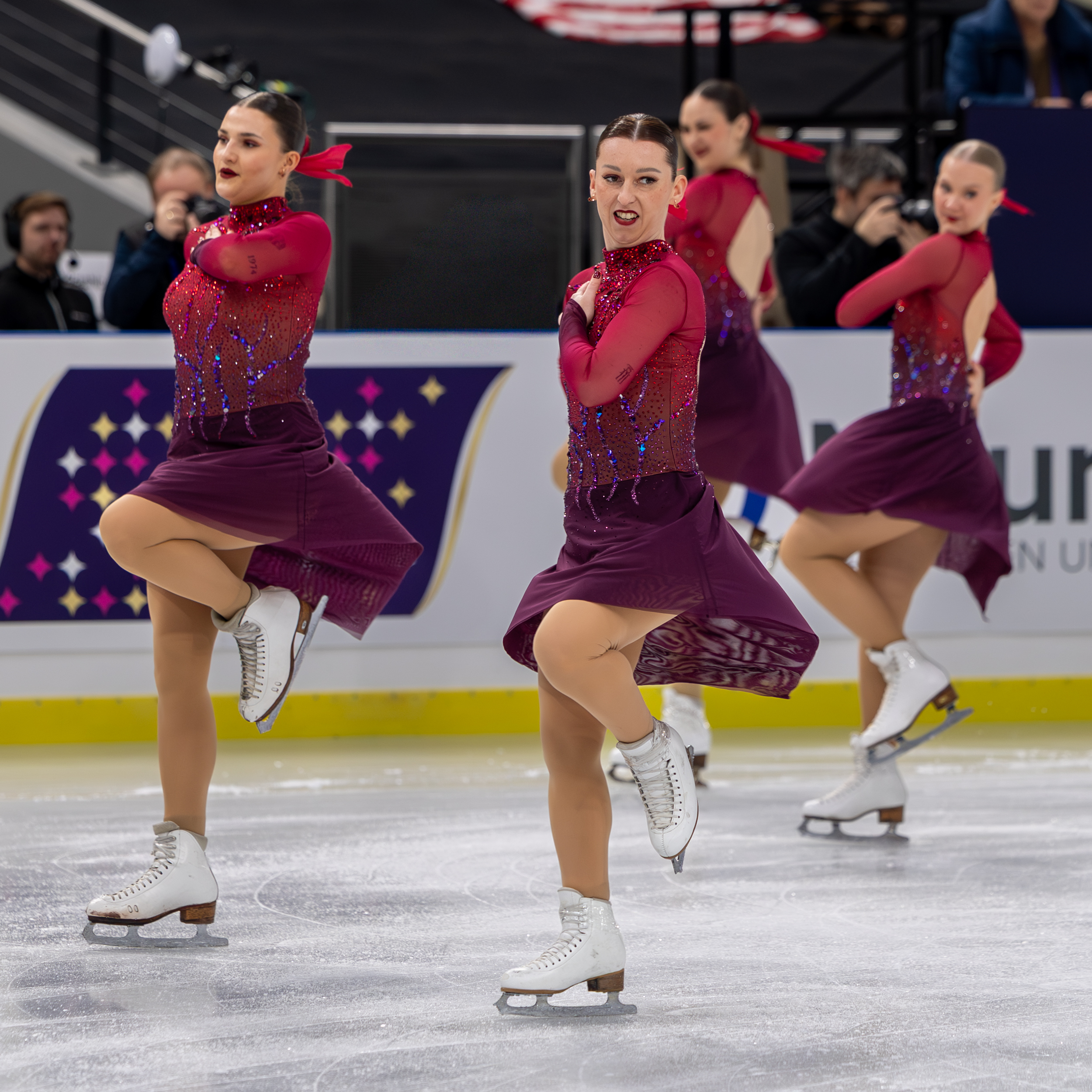
Synchronized skating, 2026

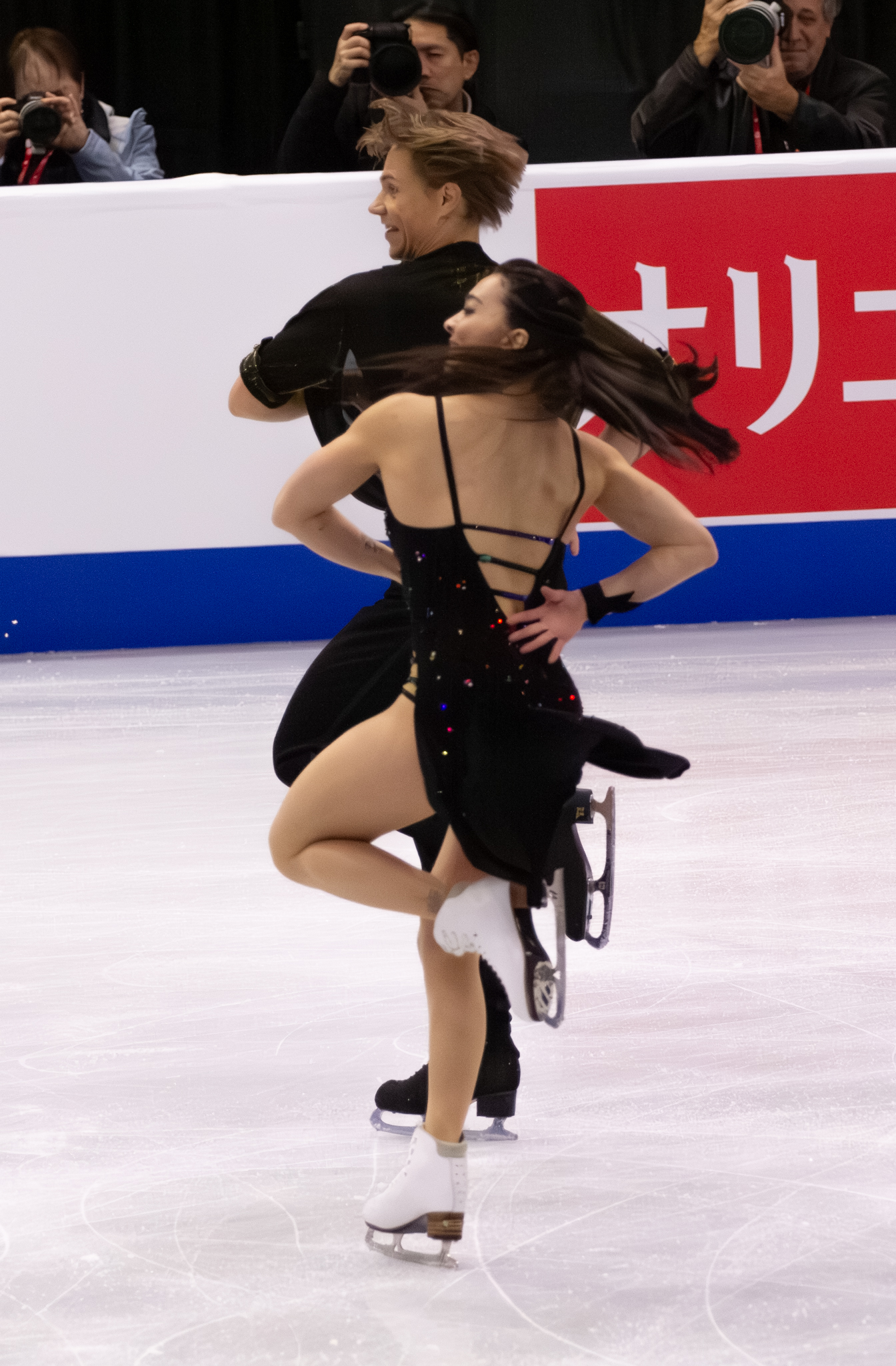
Allison Reed and Saulius Ambrulevičius, 2025

== Works cited ==
- "Special Regulations & Technical Rules – Single & Pair Skating and Ice Dance 2024" (PDF). International Skating Union. June 2024. Archived (PDF) from the original on 9 November 2024.
