= SC Karl-Marx-Stadt =

German Democratic Republic sports club

- Full name: Sports Club Karl-Marx-Stadt
- Founded: 1945; 81 years ago
- Folded: 1990; 36 years ago
- Based in: Karl-Marx-Stadt
- Location: East Germany

SC Karl-Marx-Stadt was a sports club located at Karl-Marx-Stadt in the German Democratic Republic.

Established in 1945, the sports club went through a variation of name changes until 1 July 1963, settling with SC Karl-Marx-Stadt, which lasted until its dissolution around the end of 1990.

== Sports ==
=== Figure skating ===
SC Karl-Marx-Stadt's figure skaters had won medals in Olympic, World, European, international and national competitions.

The coach for the club's singles' ladies and men's figure skating from 1960 through 1990 (the East German club's disestablishment) was Jutta Müller, who also coached her own daughter, Gabriele Seyfert. Seyfert, the first person Müller coached, won ten consecutive East German national championships from 1961 to 1970, three European Championships, two World Championships, as well as placing second in the 1968 Olympic Winter Games, becoming East Germany's first person to win an Olympic medal. Ladies figure skaters that Müller coached included Seyfert, Martina Clausner, Sonja Morgenstern, Simone Gräfe, Steffi Knoll, Anett Pötzsch, Marion Weber, Katarina Witt, Constanze Gensel, Evelyn Großmann, Simone Lang and Claudia Wagler. Men's figure skaters she coached included Günter Zöller, Klaus Purrücker, Jan Hoffmann, Nils Köpp, Rico Krahnert and Ronny Winkler. Jan Hoffmann was the most successful male figure skater from East Germany, having won four European Championship titles, two World Championship titles and a silver medal at the 1980 Olympic Winter Games. Anett Pötzsch won four European Championship titles, two World Championships and a gold medal at the 1980 Olympic Winter Games, the first Olympic gold medal in figure skating for the GDR. Pötzsch ended her career in 1980. Katarina Witt was the most successful East German with six Championship titles, four World Championship titles and two Olympic victories.

In addition to Jutta Müller, Irene Salzmann coached pairs figure skaters Sabine Baeß and Tassilo Thierbach for SC Karl-Marx-Stadt.

In late 1990, SC Karl-Marx-Stadt was succeeded by Eissportverein Chemnits (EVC), which itself was succeeded by Chemnitzer Eislauf-Club e.V. (CEC), in late 1998.

==== SC Karl-Marx-Stadt medalists ====
Olympic Figure Skating Championships

Year	Medal	Name
1968	Silver	Gabriele Seyfert
1980	Silver	Jan Hoffmann
1980	Gold	Anett Pötzsch
1984	Gold	Katarina Witt
1988	Gold	Katarina Witt

World Figure Skating Championships

Year	Medal	Name
1966	Silver	Gabriele Seyfert
1967	Silver	Gabriele Seyfert
1968	Silver	Gabriele Seyfert
1969	Gold	Gabriele Seyfert
1970	Gold	Gabriele Seyfert
1970	Bronze	Günter Zöller
1973	Bronze	Jan Hoffmann
1974	Gold	Jan Hoffmann
1976	Bronze	Jan Hoffmann
1977	Silver	Jan Hoffmann
1977	Silver	Anett Pötzsch
1978	Gold	Anett Pötzsch
1978	Silver	Jan Hoffmann
1979	Bronze	Jan Hoffmann
1979	Bronze	Sabine Baeß / Tassilo Thierbach
1979	Silver	Anett Pötzsch
1980	Gold	Anett Pötzsch
1980	Gold	Jan Hoffmann
1981	Silver	Sabine Baeß / Tassilo Thierbach
1982	Gold	Sabine Baeß / Tassilo Thierbach
1982	Silver	Katarina Witt
1983	Silver	Sabine Baeß / Tassilo Thierbach
1984	Bronze	Sabine Baeß / Tassilo Thierbach
1984	Gold	Katarina Witt
1985	Gold	Katarina Witt
1986	Silver	Katarina Witt
1987	Gold	Katarina Witt
1988	Gold	Katarina Witt

European Figure Skating Championships

Year	Medal	Name
1966	Silver	Gabriele Seyfert
1967	Gold	Gabriele Seyfert
1968	Silver	Gabriele Seyfert
1969	Gold	Gabriele Seyfert
1970	Gold	Gabriele Seyfert
1970	Bronze	Günter Zöller
1972	Bronze	Sonja Morgenstern
1973	Bronze	Jan Hoffmann
1974	Gold	Jan Hoffmann
1975	Bronze	Anett Pötzsch
1976	Silver	Anett Pötzsch
1976	Bronze	Jan Hoffmann
1977	Gold	Jan Hoffmann
1977	Gold	Anett Pötzsch
1978	Gold	Anett Pötzsch
1978	Gold	Jan Hoffmann
1979	Gold	Jan Hoffmann
1979	Bronze	Sabine Baeß / Tassilo Thierbach
1979	Gold	Anett Pötzsch
1980	Gold	Anett Pötzsch
1980	Silver	Jan Hoffmann
1982	Silver	Katarina Witt
1982	Gold	Sabine Baeß / Tassilo Thierbach
1983	Gold	Sabine Baeß / Tassilo Thierbach
1983	Gold	Katarina Witt
1984	Gold	Katarina Witt
1984	Silver	Sabine Baeß / Tassilo Thierbach
1985	Gold	Katarina Witt
1986	Gold	Katarina Witt
1987	Gold	Katarina Witt
1988	Gold	Katarina Witt
1989	Silver	Mandy Wötzel / Axel Rauschenbach
1990	Gold	Evelyn Großmann

East German Figure Skating Championships

Year	Medal	Name
1961	Gold	Gabriele Seyfert
1962	Gold	Gabriele Seyfert
1963	Silver	Günter Zöller
1963	Gold	Gabriele Seyfert
1964	Silver	Günter Zöller
1964	Gold	Gabriele Seyfert
1964	Gold	Annerose Baier / Eberhard Rüger
1964	Bronze	Eva Marie Reuter / Bernd Egert
1965	Gold	Günter Zöller
1965	Gold	Gabriele Seyfert
1965	Gold	Annerose Baier / Eberhard Rüger
1965	Bronze	Eva Marie Reuter / Bernd Egert
1966	Silver	Günter Zöller
1966	Gold	Gabriele Seyfert
1966	Bronze	Martina Clausner
1966	Gold	Annerose Baier / Eberhard Rüger
1966	Bronze	Steffi Böhme / Bernd Egert
1967	Gold	Günter Zöller
1967	Bronze	Klaus Purrücker
1967	Gold	Gabriele Seyfert
1967	Bronze	Martina Clausner
1967	Gold	Annerose Baier / Eberhard Rüger
1967	Bronze	Steffi Böhme / Bernd Egert
1968	Gold	Günter Zöller
1968	Gold	Gabriele Seyfert
1968	Silver	Martina Clausner
1968	Gold	Annerose Baier / Eberhard Rüger
1968	Silver	Steffi Böhme / Bernd Egert
1969	Gold	Günter Zöller
1969	Silver	Jan Hoffmann
1969	Gold	Gabriele Seyfert
1969	Silver	Sonja Morgenstern
1969	Gold	Annerose Baier / Eberhard Rüger
1969	Bronze	Sylke Müller / Peter Müller
1970	Gold	Günter Zöller
1970	Silver	Jan Hoffmann
1970	Gold	Gabriele Seyfert
1970	Silver	Sonja Morgenstern
1970	Bronze	Annette Kansy / Axel Salzmann
1970	Gold	Annerose Baier / Eberhard Rüger
1970	Silver	Sylke Müller / Peter Müller
1971	Gold	Jan Hoffmann
1971	Gold	Sonja Morgenstern
1971	Bronze	Simone Gräfe
1971	Silver	Annette Kansy / Axel Salzmann
1972	Gold	Jan Hoffmann
1972	Gold	Sonja Morgenstern
1972	Bronze	Steffi Knoll
1972	Silver	Annette Kansy / Axel Salzmann
1973	Gold	Jan Hoffmann
1973	Gold	Sonja Morgenstern
1973	Bronze	Anett Pötzsch
1973	Bronze	Antje Heck / Tassilo Thierbach
1974	Gold	Jan Hoffmann
1974	Silver	Anett Pötzsch
1974	Bronze	Marion Weber
1975	Silver	Anett Pötzsch
1975	Bronze	Steffi Knoll
1976	Gold	Jan Hoffmann
1976	Gold	Anett Pötzsch
1976	Silver	Marion Weber
1976	Bronze	Sabine Baeß / Tassilo Thierbach
1977	Gold	Jan Hoffmann
1977	Gold	Anett Pötzsch
1977	Silver	Marion Weber
1977	Bronze	Sabine Baeß / Tassilo Thierbach
1978	Gold	Jan Hoffmann
1978	Gold	Anett Pötzsch
1978	Bronze	Marion Weber
1978	Silver	Sabine Baeß / Tassilo Thierbach
1979	Gold	Jan Hoffmann
1979	Gold	Anett Pötzsch
1979	Bronze	Katarina Witt
1979	Gold	Sabine Baeß / Tassilo Thierbach
1980	Gold	Jan Hoffmann
1980	Gold	Anett Pötzsch
1980	Silver	Katarina Witt
1980	Gold	Sabine Baeß / Tassilo Thierbach
1981	Gold	Katarina Witt
1981	Bronze	Gesine Bosdorf / Jens Preussner
1982	Gold	Katarina Witt
1982	Gold	Sabine Baeß / Tassilo Thierbach
1982	Bronze	Gesine Bosdorf / Jens Preussner
1983	Silver	Nils Köpp
1983	Gold	Katarina Witt
1983	Gold	Sabine Baeß / Tassilo Thierbach
1984	Bronze	Nils Köpp
1984	Gold	Katarina Witt
1984	Bronze	Constanze Gensel
1984	Gold	Sabine Baeß / Tassilo Thierbach
1985	Silver	Nils Köpp
1985	Gold	Katarina Witt
1985	Silver	Constanze Gensel
1985	Silver	Manuela Landgraf / Ingo Steuer
1985	Bronze	Peggy Seidel / Ralf Seifert
1986	Silver	Nils Köpp
1986	Gold	Katarina Witt
1986	Silver	Constanze Gensel
1986	Bronze	Peggy Seidel / Ralf Seifert
1987	Silver	Nils Köpp
1987	Gold	Katarina Witt
1987	Silver	Antje Schramm / Jens Müller
1988	Silver	Rico Krahnert
1988	Gold	Katarina Witt
1988	Bronze	Evelyn Großmann
1988	Silver	Mandy Wötzel / Axel Rauschenbach
1989	Silver	Ronny Winkler
1989	Bronze	Rico Krahnert
1989	Gold	Evelyn Großmann
1989	Silver	Simone Lang
1989	Gold	Mandy Wötzel / Axel Rauschenbach
1989	Bronze	Ines Müller / Ingo Steuer
1990	Gold	Ronny Winkler
1990	Bronze	Claudia Wagler
1990	Gold	Mandy Wötzel / Axel Rauschenbach
1990	Bronze	Ines Müller / Ingo Steuer

==== Eissportverein Chemnits (EVC) medalists ====
Olympic Figure Skating Championships

Year	Medal	Name
1998	Bronze	Mandy Wötzel / Ingo Steuer

World Figure Skating Championships

Year	Medal	Name
1993	Silver	Mandy Wötzel / Ingo Steuer
1996	Silver	Mandy Wötzel / Ingo Steuer
1997	Gold	Mandy Wötzel / Ingo Steuer

European Figure Skating Championships

Year	Medal	Name
1991	Silver	Evelyn Großmann
1993	Silver	Mandy Wötzel / Ingo Steuer
1995	Gold	Mandy Wötzel / Ingo Steuer
1996	Silver	Mandy Wötzel / Ingo Steuer
1997	Silver	Mandy Wötzel / Ingo Steuer

German Figure Skating Championships

Year	Medal	Name
1991	Bronze	Ronny Winkler
1991	Bronze	Evelyn Großmann
1991	Gold	Mandy Wötzel / Axel Rauschenbach
1992	Silver	Ronny Winkler
1992	Silver	Mandy Wötzel / Axel Rauschenbach
1993	Gold	Ronny Winkler
1993	Gold	Mandy Wötzel / Ingo Steuer
1994	Gold	Ronny Winkler
1994	Silver	Katarina Witt
1994	Gold	Anuschka Gläser / Axel Rauschenbach
1995	Silver	Ronny Winkler
1995	Gold	Mandy Wötzel / Ingo Steuer
1995	Bronze	Silvia Dimitrov / Rico Rex
1996	Silver	Ronny Winkler
1996	Gold	Mandy Wötzel / Ingo Steuer
1996	Silver	Silvia Dimitrov / Rico Rex
1997	Gold	Mandy Wötzel / Ingo Steuer

==== Chemnitzer Eislauf-Club e.V. (CEC) medalists ====
Olympic Figure Skating Championships

Year	Medal	Name
2010	Bronze	Aljona Savchenko / Robin Szolkowy
2014	Bronze	Aljona Savchenko / Robin Szolkowy
2018	Gold	Aljona Savchenko / Bruno Massot

World Figure Skating Championships

Year	Medal	Name
2007	Bronze	Aljona Savchenko / Robin Szolkowy
2008	Gold	Aljona Savchenko / Robin Szolkowy
2009	Gold	Aljona Savchenko / Robin Szolkowy
2010	Silver	Aljona Savchenko / Robin Szolkowy
2011	Gold	Aljona Savchenko / Robin Szolkowy
2012	Gold	Aljona Savchenko / Robin Szolkowy
2013	Silver	Aljona Savchenko / Robin Szolkowy
2014	Gold	Aljona Savchenko / Robin Szolkowy
2016	Bronze	Aljona Savchenko / Bruno Massot
2017	Silver	Aljona Savchenko / Bruno Massot
2018	Gold	Aljona Savchenko / Bruno Massot

European Figure Skating Championships

Year	Medal	Name
2006	Silver	Aljona Savchenko / Robin Szolkowy
2007	Gold	Aljona Savchenko / Robin Szolkowy
2008	Gold	Aljona Savchenko / Robin Szolkowy
2009	Gold	Aljona Savchenko / Robin Szolkowy
2010	Silver	Aljona Savchenko / Robin Szolkowy
2011	Gold	Aljona Savchenko / Robin Szolkowy
2013	Silver	Aljona Savchenko / Robin Szolkowy
2016	Silver	Aljona Savchenko / Bruno Massot
2017	Silver	Aljona Savchenko / Bruno Massot

German Figure Skating Championships

Year	Medal	Name
1999	Silver	Stefanie Weiss / Matthias Bleyer
2000	Bronze	Katharina Rybkowski / Rico Rex
2001	Gold	Claudia Rauschenbach / Robin Szolkowy
2002	Bronze	Nicole Nönnig / Matthias Bleyer
2003	Gold	Eva-Maria Fitze / Rico Rex
2003	Silver	Nicole Nönnig / Matthias Bleyer
2004	Gold	Aljona Savchenko / Robin Szolkowy
2004	Silver	Eva-Maria Fitze / Rico Rex
2005	Gold	Aljona Savchenko / Robin Szolkowy
2005	Bronze	Eva-Maria Fitze / Rico Rex
2006	Gold	Aljona Savchenko / Robin Szolkowy
2006	Bronze	Eva-Maria Fitze / Rico Rex
2007	Gold	Aljona Savchenko / Robin Szolkowy
2008	Gold	Aljona Savchenko / Robin Szolkowy
2009	Gold	Aljona Savchenko / Robin Szolkowy
2010	Silver	Nicole Gurny / Martin Liebers
2011	Gold	Aljona Savchenko / Robin Szolkowy
2012	Bronze	Martin Rappe
2014	Gold	Aljona Savchenko / Robin Szolkowy
2015	Bronze	Lutricia Bock
2016	Gold	Lutricia Bock
2016	Gold	Aljona Savchenko / Bruno Massot
2018	Gold	Aljona Savchenko / Bruno Massot
2019	Bronze	Jennifer Janse van Rensburg / Benjamin Steffan
2020	Silver	Jennifer Janse van Rensburg / Benjamin Steffan
2022	Gold	Jennifer Janse van Rensburg / Benjamin Steffan
2023	Gold	Jennifer Janse van Rensburg / Benjamin Steffan
2023	Silver	Letizia Roscher / Luis Schuster

=== Speed skating ===
In contrast to figure skating, speed skating produced only one athlete of world class. Gabi Pliers won three Olympic bronze medals, 12 World Championship medals, and four European title. Speed skating and figure skating went on to form a new successor club upon German reunification.

=== Football ===
The footballers of the SC Karl-Marx-Stadt originally began play in 1954. The football department was separated from the sports club and reorganized as football club FC Karl-Marx-Stadt in 1966. The football club was renamed Chemnitzer FC after the Peaceful Revolution.

=== Weight lifting ===
The Weightlifters were numerically the most successful department of SC Karl-Marx-Stadt, with 125 medals coming from the Olympics, World and European Championships.

=== Athletics ===
Track and field athletes of the SC Karl-Marx-Stadt were quite successful, winning two Olympic gold medals, two World Championships and seven European Championship titles.

=== Cycling ===
The track cyclists of the SC Karl-Marx-Stadt won two silver medals at the Olympic Games.

=== Swimming ===
Swimming produced 119 medals, of which 72 were Olympic gold medals, World and European Championships and was the most successful section of the sporting club with titles.

=== Gymnastics ===
The KTV Chemnitz emerged from the section of gymnastics as its successor sports club.

== Medals ==
Medals of athletes of the SC Karl-Marx-Stadt from 1963 to 1989.
