= 1976 European Figure Skating Championships =

Figure skating competition

1976 European Championships
- Type: ISU Championship
- Date: January 13 – 18
- Season: 1975–76
- Location: Geneva, Switzerland
- Venue: Patinoire des Vernets

Champions
- Men's singles: (United Kingdom) John Curry
- Ladies' singles: (Netherlands) Dianne de Leeuw
- Pairs: (Soviet Union) Irina Rodnina / Alexander Zaitsev
- Ice dance: (Soviet Union) Liudmila Pakhomova / Alexander Gorshkov
- Previous: 1975 European Championships
- Next: 1977 European Championships

The 1976 European Figure Skating Championships was a senior-level international competition held in Geneva, Switzerland on January 13–18. Elite senior-level figure skaters from European ISU member nations competed for the title of European Champion in the disciplines of men's singles, ladies' singles, pair skating, and ice dancing.

== Results ==
=== Men ===
Rank	Name	Nation	CF	SP	FS
1	John Curry	United Kingdom	2	2	1
2	Vladimir Kovalev	Soviet Union	1	1	4
3	Jan Hoffmann	East Germany	4		2
4	Yuri Ovchinnikov	Soviet Union			3
5	Sergei Volkov	Soviet Union	3		
6	Robin Cousins	United Kingdom	13	7	5
7	Zdeněk Pazdírek	Czechoslovakia			
8	László Vajda	Hungary			
9	Pekka Leskinen	Finland			
10	Ronald Koppelent	Austria			
11	Mario Liebers	East Germany			
12	Miroslav Šoška	Czechoslovakia			
13	Jean-Christophe Simond	France			
14	Glyn Jones	United Kingdom			
15	Grzegorz Głowania	Poland			
16	Gilles Beyer	France			
17	Gerd-Walter Gräbner	West Germany			
18	Gerhard Hubmann	Austria			
19	Rolando Bragaglia	Italy			
20	Paul Cechmanek	Luxembourg			
21	Martin Sochor	Switzerland			
22	Matjaž Krušec	Yugoslavia			
23	Flemming Soderquist	Denmark			

=== Ladies ===
Rank	Name	Nation
1	Dianne de Leeuw	Netherlands
2	Anett Pötzsch	East Germany
3	Christine Errath	East Germany
4	Isabel de Navarre	West Germany
5	Susanna Driano	Italy
6	Dagmar Lurz	West Germany
7	Danielle Rieder	Switzerland
8	Elena Vodorezova	Soviet Union
9	Gerti Schanderl	West Germany
10	Karena Richardson	United Kingdom
11	Grażyna Dudek	Poland
12	Hana Knapová	Czechoslovakia
13	Claudia Kristofics-Binder	Austria
14	Lotta Crispin	Sweden
15	Evi Kopfli	Switzerland
16	Marie-Claude Bierre	France
17	Niina Kyottinen	Finland
18	Anne-Marie Verlaan	Netherlands
19	Katja Seretti	Italy
20	Sophie Verlaan	Netherlands
21	Maja Zupancic	Yugoslavia
22	Bente Larsen	Norway
WD	Marion Weber	East Germany

=== Pairs ===
Rank	Name	Nation
1	Irina Rodnina / Alexander Zaitsev	Soviet Union
2	Romy Kermer / Rolf Österreich	East Germany
3	Irina Vorobieva / Alexander Vlasov	Soviet Union
4	Manuela Groß / Uwe Kagelmann	East Germany
5	Karin Künzle / Christian Künzle	Switzerland
6	Kerstin Stolfig / Veit Kempe	East Germany
7	Marina Leonidova / Vladimir Bogolyubov	Soviet Union
8	Corinna Halke / Eberhard Rausch	West Germany
9	Ursula Nemec / Michael Nemec	Austria
10	Gabriele Beck / Jochen Stahl	West Germany
11	Erika Taylforth / Colin Taylforth	United Kingdom
12	Ingrid Spieglová / Alan Spiegl	Czechoslovakia
13	Gabriele Arco / Nikolaus Stephan	Austria

=== Ice dancing ===
Rank	Name	Nation
1	Liudmila Pakhomova / Alexander Gorshkov	Soviet Union
2	Irina Moiseeva / Andrei Minenkov	Soviet Union
3	Natalia Linichuk / Gennadi Karponosov	Soviet Union
4	Krisztina Regőczy / András Sallay	Hungary
5	Hilary Green / Glyn Watts	United Kingdom
6	Matilde Ciccia / Lamberto Ceserani	Italy
7	Teresa Weyna / Piotr Bojańczyk	Poland
8	Janet Thompson / Warren Maxwell	United Kingdom
9	Eva Peštová / Jiří Pokorný	Czechoslovakia
10	Kay Barsdell / Kenneth Foster	United Kingdom
11	Susi Handschmann / Peter Handschmann	Switzerland
12	Stefania Bertele / Walter Cecconi	Italy
13	Marie-Joelle Michel / Frédéric Gardin	France
14	Isabella Rizzi / Luigi Freroni	Italy
15	Ewa Kołodziej / Tadeusz Góra	Poland
16	Christina Henke / Udo Dönsdorf	West Germany
17	Gerda Bühler / Maxime Erlanger	Switzerland
