= 1977 European Figure Skating Championships =

Figure skating competition

1977 European Championships
- Type: ISU Championship
- Season: 1976–77
- Location: Helsinki, Finland
- Venue: Helsinki Ice Hall

Champions
- Men's singles: (East Germany) Jan Hoffmann
- Ladies' singles: (East Germany) Anett Pötzsch
- Pairs: (Soviet Union) Irina Rodnina / Alexander Zaitsev
- Ice dance: (Soviet Union) Irina Moiseeva / Andrei Minenkov
- Previous: 1976 European Championships
- Next: 1978 European Championships

The 1977 European Figure Skating Championships was a senior-level international competition held in Helsinki, Finland. Elite senior-level figure skaters from European ISU member nations competed for the title of European Champion in the disciplines of men's singles, ladies' singles, pair skating, and ice dancing.

== Results ==
=== Men ===
Rank	Name	Nation	CF	SP	FS
1	Jan Hoffmann	East Germany	2	1	
2	Vladimir Kovalev	Soviet Union	1	3	
3	Robin Cousins	United Kingdom	7	2	
4	Yuri Ovchinnikov	Soviet Union			
5	Pekka Leskinen	Finland	3		
6	Konstantin Kokora	Soviet Union			
7	Ronald Koppelent	Austria			
8	Mario Liebers	East Germany			
9	Miroslav Šoška	Czechoslovakia			
10	Kurt Kürzinger	West Germany			
11	Gerhard Hubmann	Austria			
12	Grzegorz Głowania	Poland			
13	Glyn Jones	United Kingdom			
14	Thomas Öberg	Sweden			
15	Matjaž Krušec	Yugoslavia			
WD	Christophe Boyadjian	France			

=== Ladies ===
Rank	Name	Nation
1	Anett Pötzsch	East Germany
2	Dagmar Lurz	West Germany
3	Susanna Driano	Italy
4	Marion Weber	East Germany
5	Elena Vodorezova	Soviet Union
6	Denise Biellmann	Switzerland
7	Kristiina Wegelius	Finland
8	Claudia Kristofics-Binder	Austria
9	Karin Enke	East Germany
10	Danielle Rieder	Switzerland
11	Zhanna Ilina	Soviet Union
12	Deborah Cottrill	United Kingdom
13	Karena Richardson	United Kingdom
14	Gerti Schanderl	West Germany
15	Grażyna Dudek	Poland
16	Sanda Dubravčić	Yugoslavia
17	Eva Ďurišinová	Czechoslovakia
18	Franca Bianconi	Italy
19	Lotta Crispin	Sweden
20	Anne-Marie Verlaan	Netherlands
21	Doina Mitricica	Romania
22	Anne-Sophie de Kristoffy	France
23	Katja Seretti	Italy
24	Bente Larsen	Norway
25	Gloria Mas	Spain

=== Pairs ===
Rank	Name	Nation
1	Irina Rodnina / Alexander Zaitsev	Soviet Union
2	Irina Vorobieva / Alexander Vlasov	Soviet Union
3	Marina Cherkasova / Sergei Shakhrai	Soviet Union
4	Manuela Mager / Uwe Bewersdorf	East Germany
5	Sabine Baeß / Tassilo Thierbach	East Germany
6	Ingrid Spieglová / Alan Spiegl	Czechoslovakia
7	Elżbieta Łuczyńska / Marek Chrolenko	Poland
8	Susanne Scheibe / Andreas Nischwitz	West Germany
9	Sabine Fuchs / Xavier Videau	France
10	Gabriele Beck / Jochen Stahl	West Germany
11	Chantal Zürcher / Paul Huber	Switzerland

=== Ice dancing ===
Rank	Name	Nation
1	Irina Moiseeva / Andrei Minenkov	Soviet Union
2	Krisztina Regőczy / András Sallay	Hungary
3	Natalia Linichuk / Gennadi Karponosov	Soviet Union
4	Janet Thompson / Warren Maxwell	United Kingdom
5	Marina Zueva / Andrei Vitman	Soviet Union
6	Kay Barsdell / Kenneth Foster	United Kingdom
7	Liliana Řeháková / Stanislav Drastich	Czechoslovakia
8	Susi Handschmann / Peter Handschmann	Switzerland
9	Isabella Rizzi / Luigi Freroni	Italy
10	Halina Gordon / Tadeusz Góra	Poland
11	Anna Pisánská / Jiří Musil	Czechoslovakia
12	Stefania Bertele / Walter Cecconi	Italy
13	Elżbieta Wegrzyk / Andrzej Alberciak	Poland
14	Muriel Boucher / Yves Malatier	France
