= 1975 European Figure Skating Championships =

Figure skating competition

1975 European Championships
- Type: ISU Championship
- Date: January 28 – February 2
- Season: 1974–75
- Location: Copenhagen, Denmark
- Venue: Brøndbyhallen

Champions
- Men's singles: (Soviet Union) Vladimir Kovalev
- Ladies' singles: (East Germany) Christine Errath
- Pairs: (Soviet Union) Irina Rodnina / Alexander Zaitsev
- Ice dance: (Soviet Union) Liudmila Pakhomova / Alexander Gorshkov
- Previous: 1974 European Championships
- Next: 1976 European Championships

The 1975 European Figure Skating Championships was a senior-level international competition held in Copenhagen, Denmark from January 28 to February 2. Elite senior-level figure skaters from European ISU member nations competed for the title of European Champion in the disciplines of men's singles, ladies' singles, pair skating, and ice dancing.

== Results ==
=== Men ===
Rank	Name	Nation	CP	SP	FS	SP+FS	Points	Placings
1	Vladimir Kovalev	Soviet Union	2				233.49	11
2	John Curry	United Kingdom	3				229.48	20
3	Yuri Ovchinnikov	Soviet Union			1		227.36	27
4	Sergei Volkov	Soviet Union	1					
5	László Vajda	Hungary						
6	Zdeněk Pazdírek	Czechoslovakia						
7	Bernd Wunderlich	East Germany						
8	Hermann Schulz	East Germany						
9	Didier Gailhaguet	France						
10	Ronald Koppelent	Austria						
11	Robin Cousins	United Kingdom	11	8	10			
12	Pekka Leskinen	Finland						
13	Erich Reifschneider	West Germany						
14	Miroslav Šoška	Czechoslovakia						
15	Jacek Tascher	Poland						
16	Jean-Christophe Simond	France						
17	Glyn Jones	United Kingdom						
18	Thomas Öberg	Sweden						
19	Paul Cechmanek	Luxembourg						
20	Flemming Soderquist	Denmark						
21	Rob Ouwerkerk	Netherlands						

=== Ladies ===
Rank	Name	Nation
1	Christine Errath	East Germany
2	Dianne de Leeuw	Netherlands
3	Anett Pötzsch	East Germany
4	Liana Drahová	Czechoslovakia
5	Isabel de Navarre	West Germany
6	Susanna Driano	Italy
7	Marion Weber	East Germany
8	Dagmar Lurz	West Germany
9	Evi Kopfli	Switzerland
10	Karin Iten	Switzerland
11	Gerti Schanderl	West Germany
12	Sonja Balun	Austria
13	Hana Knapová	Czechoslovakia
14	Liudmila Bakonina	Soviet Union
15	Michelle Haider	Switzerland
16	Grażyna Dudek	Poland
17	Marie-Claude Bierre	France
18	Yvonne Kavanagh	United Kingdom
19	Gail Keddie	United Kingdom
20	Sophie Verlaan	Netherlands
21	Lise-Lotte Öberg	Sweden
22	Anne-Marie Verlaan	Netherlands
23	Sonja Stanek	Austria
24	Susan Broman	Finland
25	Helena Gazvoda	Yugoslavia
26	Bente Larsen	Norway
27	Carinne Henrotte	Belgium

=== Pairs ===
Rank	Name	Nation
1	Irina Rodnina / Alexander Zaitsev	Soviet Union
2	Romy Kermer / Rolf Österreich	East Germany
3	Manuela Groß / Uwe Kagelmann	East Germany
4	Marina Leonidova / Vladimir Bogolyubov	Soviet Union
5	Karin Kunzle / Christian Kunzle	Switzerland
6	Nadezhda Gorshkova / Evgeni Shevalovski	Soviet Union
7	Kerstin Stolfig / Veit Kempe	East Germany
8	Corinna Halke / Eberhard Rausch	West Germany
9	Grażyna Kostrzewińska / Adam Brodecki	Poland
10	Ursula Nemec / Michael Nemec	Austria
11	Teresa Skrzek / Piotr Sczypa	Poland
12	Ingrid Spieglová / Alan Spiegl	Czechoslovakia
13	Petra Schneider / Bogdan Pulcer	West Germany
WD	Gabriele Arco / Nikolaus Stephan	Austria

=== Ice dancing ===
Rank	Name	Nation
1	Liudmila Pakhomova / Alexander Gorshkov	Soviet Union
2	Hilary Green / Glyn Watts	United Kingdom
3	Natalia Linichuk / Gennadi Karponosov	Soviet Union
4	Irina Moiseeva / Andrei Minenkov	Soviet Union
5	Matilde Ciccia / Lamberto Ceserani	Italy
6	Krisztina Regőczy / András Sallay	Hungary
7	Janet Thompson / Warren Maxwell	United Kingdom
8	Teresa Weyna / Piotr Bojańczyk	Poland
9	Kay Barsdell / Kenneth Foster	United Kingdom
10	Eva Peštová / Jiří Pokorný	Czechoslovakia
11	Christina Henke / Udo Dönsdorf	West Germany
12	Stefania Bertele / Walter Cecconi	Italy
13	Ewa Kołodziej / Tadeusz Góra	Poland
14	Isabella Rizzi / Luigi Freroni	Italy
15	Gerda Bühler / Maxime Erlanger	Switzerland
16	Susi Handschmann / Peter Handschmann	Austria
