= 1974 European Figure Skating Championships =

Figure skating competition

1974 European Championships
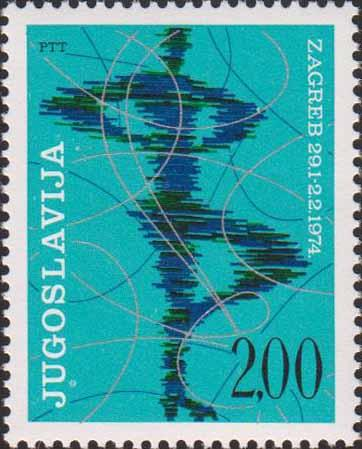
- Stamp of Yugoslavia dedicated to the 1974 European Figure Skating Championships
- Type: ISU Championship
- Date: January 29 – February 2
- Season: 1973–74
- Location: Zagreb, Yugoslavia
- Venue: Dom Sportova

Champions
- Men's singles: (East Germany) Jan Hoffmann
- Ladies' singles: (East Germany) Christine Errath
- Pairs: (Soviet Union) Irina Rodnina / Alexander Zaitsev
- Ice dance: (Soviet Union) Liudmila Pakhomova / Alexander Gorshkov
- Previous: 1973 European Championships
- Next: 1975 European Championships

The 1974 European Figure Skating Championships was a senior-level international competition held in Zagreb, Yugoslavia from January 29 to February 2. Elite senior-level figure skaters from European ISU member nations competed for the title of European Champion in the disciplines of men's singles, ladies' singles, pair skating, and ice dancing.

== Results ==
=== Men ===
Rank	Name	Nation	CP	SP	FS	SP+FS	Points	Placings
1	Jan Hoffmann	East Germany				2	233.73	11
2	Sergei Volkov	Soviet Union	1			1	228.78	23
3	John Curry	United Kingdom					229.12	27
4	Vladimir Kovalev	Soviet Union				3		
5	Yuri Ovchinnikov	Soviet Union						
6	László Vajda	Hungary						
7	Didier Gailhaguet	France						
8	Zdeněk Pazdírek	Czechoslovakia						
9	Bernd Wunderlich	East Germany						
10	František Pechar	Czechoslovakia						
11	Robin Cousins	United Kingdom	16	12	7			
12	Erich Reifschneider	West Germany						
13	Michael Glaubitz	East Germany						
14	Ronald Koppelent	Austria						
15	Rolando Bragaglia	Italy						
16	Glyn Jones	United Kingdom						
17	Pascal Delorme	France						
18	Thomas Öberg	Sweden						
19	Pekka Leskinen	Finland						
20	Rob Ouwerkerk	Netherlands						
21	Jacek Żylski	Poland						
22	Silvo Svajger	Yugoslavia						
23	Gheorghe Fazekas	Romania						
24	Paul Cechmanek	Luxembourg						

=== Ladies ===
Rank	Name	Nation
1	Christine Errath	East Germany
2	Dianne de Leeuw	Netherlands
3	Liana Drahová	Czechoslovakia
4	Gerti Schanderl	West Germany
5	Karin Iten	Switzerland
6	Maria McLean	United Kingdom
7	Anett Pötzsch	East Germany
8	Isabel de Navarre	West Germany
9	Marion Weber	East Germany
10	Sonja Balun	Austria
11	Cinzia Frosio	Italy
12	Hana Knapová	Czechoslovakia
13	Susanne Altura	Austria
14	Marie-Claude Bierre	France
15	Gail Keddie	United Kingdom
16	Lise-Lotte Öberg	Sweden
17	Helena Gazvoda	Yugoslavia
18	Zdenka Fiuraskova	Czechoslovakia
19	Sophie Verlaan	Netherlands
20	Evelyne Reusser	Switzerland
21	Marina Sanaya	Soviet Union
22	Manuele Bertele	Italy
23	Petra Wagner	West Germany
24	Grażyna Dudek	Poland
25	Kathy Brunner	Switzerland
26	Susan Broman	Finland
27	Ágnes Erős	Hungary
28	Bente Tverran	Norway

=== Pairs ===
Rank	Name	Nation
1	Irina Rodnina / Alexander Zaitsev	Soviet Union
2	Romy Kermer / Rolf Österreich	East Germany
3	Liudmila Smirnova / Alexei Ulanov	Soviet Union
4	Manuela Groß / Uwe Kagelmann	East Germany
5	Nadezhda Gorshkova / Evgeni Shevalovski	Soviet Union
6	Karin Künzle / Christian Künzle	Switzerland
7	Corinna Halke / Eberhard Rausch	West Germany
8	Ursula Nemec / Michael Nemec	Austria
9	Katja Schubert / Knut Schubert	East Germany
10	Grażyna Kostrzewińska / Adam Brodecki	Poland
11	Teresa Skrzek / Piotr Sczypa	Poland
12	Florence Cahn / Jean-Roland Racle	France
13	Rijana Hartmanova / Petr Starec	Czechoslovakia
14	Pascale Kovelmann / Jean-Pierre Rondel	France
15	Linda McCafferty / Colin Taylforth	United Kingdom
16	Petra Schneider / Bogdan Pulcer	West Germany
17	Andrea Meier / Roland Meier	Switzerland

=== Ice dancing ===
Rank	Name	Nation
1	Liudmila Pakhomova / Alexander Gorshkov	Soviet Union
2	Hilary Green / Glyn Watts	United Kingdom
3	Natalia Linichuk / Gennadi Karponosov	Soviet Union
4	Janet Sawbridge / Peter Dalby	United Kingdom
5	Irina Moiseeva / Andrei Minenkov	Soviet Union
6	Matilde Ciccia / Lamberto Ceserani	Italy
7	Krisztina Regőczy / András Sallay	Hungary
8	Janet Thompson / Warren Maxwell	United Kingdom
9	Teresa Weyna / Piotr Bojańczyk	Poland
10	Diana Skotnická / Martin Skotnický	Czechoslovakia
11	Gerda Bühler / Mathis Bachi	Switzerland
12	Sylvia Fuchs / Michael Fuchs	West Germany
13	Isabella Rizzi / Luigi Freroni	Italy
14	Eva Peštová / Jiří Pokorný	Czechoslovakia
15	Brigitte Scheijbal / Walter Leschetizky	Austria
16	Andrea Dohany / György Lenart	Hungary
17	Nicole Rinsant / Dirk Beyer	West Germany
