= 1979 European Figure Skating Championships =

Figure skating competition

1979 European Championships
- Type: ISU Championship
- Date: January 30 – February 4
- Season: 1978–79
- Location: Zagreb, Yugoslavia
- Venue: Dom Sportova

Champions
- Men's singles: (East Germany) Jan Hoffmann
- Ladies' singles: (East Germany) Anett Pötzsch
- Pairs: (Soviet Union) Marina Cherkasova / Sergei Shakhrai
- Ice dance: (Soviet Union) Natalia Linichuk / Gennadi Karponosov
- Previous: 1978 European Championships
- Next: 1980 European Championships

The 1979 European Figure Skating Championships was a senior-level international competition held in Zagreb, Yugoslavia from January 30 to February 4. Elite senior-level figure skaters from European ISU member nations competed for the title of European Champion in the disciplines of men's singles, ladies' singles, pair skating, and ice dancing.

== Results ==
=== Men ===
Rank	Name	Nation	CF	SP	FS
1	Jan Hoffmann	East Germany	2	2	2
2	Vladimir Kovalev	Soviet Union	1	3	4
3	Robin Cousins	United Kingdom	6	1	1
4	Jean-Christophe Simond	France	4	6	3
5	Igor Bobrin	Soviet Union			
6	Konstantin Kokora	Soviet Union	12		
7	Hermann Schulz	East Germany			
8	Mario Liebers	East Germany			
9	Miroslav Šoška	Czechoslovakia			
10	László Vajda	Hungary			
11	Norbert Schramm	West Germany			
12	Thomas Nieder	West Germany			
13	Helmut Kristofics-Binder	Austria			
14	Grzegorz Głowania	Poland			
15	Christopher Howarth	United Kingdom			
16	Michel Lotz	France			
17	Jozef Sabovčík	Czechoslovakia			
18	Thomas Öberg	Sweden			
19	Matjaž Krušec	Yugoslavia			
20	Antti Kontiola	Finland			

=== Ladies ===
Rank	Name	Nation	CP	SP	FS	SP+FS	Points	Placings
1	Anett Pötzsch	East Germany	1	1	2			
2	Dagmar Lurz	West Germany	2	4	5			
3	Denise Biellmann	Switzerland	8	2	1			
4	Kristiina Wegelius	Finland	3	3	8			
5	Carola Weißenberg	East Germany			3			
6	Karin Riediger	West Germany						
7	Sanda Dubravčić	Yugoslavia	15	5	4			
8	Susanna Driano	Italy	4					
9	Deborah Cottrill	United Kingdom	7					
10	Kira Ivanova	Soviet Union						
11	Renata Baierová	Czechoslovakia						
12	Karena Richardson	United Kingdom	6					
13	Susan Broman	Finland	5					
14	Katarina Witt	East Germany	18		7			
15	Petra Ernert	West Germany						
16	Jeanne Chapman	Norway						
17	Natalia Strelkova	Soviet Union						
18	Sonja Stanek	Austria						
19	Anita Siegfried	Switzerland						
20	Astrid Jansen in de Wal	Netherlands						
21	Corine Wyrsch	Switzerland						
22	Anne-Sophie de Kristoffy	France						
23	Franca Bianconi	Italy						
24	Christina Svensson	Sweden						
25	Genevieve Schoumacker	Belgium						
26	Helena Chwila	Poland						
27	Heidi Bartelsen	Denmark						
28	Margarita Dimitrova	Bulgaria						
29	Gloria Mas	Spain						

=== Pairs ===
Rank	Name	Nation
1	Marina Cherkasova / Sergei Shakhrai	Soviet Union
2	Irina Vorobieva / Igor Lisovski	Soviet Union
3	Sabine Baeß / Tassilo Thierbach	East Germany
4	Marina Pestova / Stanislav Leonovich	Soviet Union
5	Kerstin Stolfig / Veit Kempe	East Germany
6	Ingrid Spieglová / Alan Spiegl	Czechoslovakia
7	Kornelia Haufe / Kersten Bellmann	East Germany
8	Christina Riegel / Andreas Nischwitz	West Germany
9	Maria Jeżak / Lech Matuszewski	Poland
10	Christine Eicher / Paul Huber	Switzerland

=== Ice dancing ===
Rank	Name	Nation
1	Natalia Linichuk / Gennadi Karponosov	Soviet Union
2	Irina Moiseeva / Andrei Minenkov	Soviet Union
3	Krisztina Regőczy / András Sallay	Hungary
4	Liliana Řeháková / Stanislav Drastich	Czechoslovakia
5	Natalia Karamysheva / Rostislav Sinitsyn	Soviet Union
6	Jayne Torvill / Christopher Dean	United Kingdom
7	Susi Handschmann / Peter Handschmann	Austria
8	Isabella Rizzi / Luigi Freroni	Italy
9	Henriette Fröschl / Christian Steiner	West Germany
10	Anna Pisánská / Jiří Musil	Czechoslovakia
11	Karen Barber / Nicholas Slater	United Kingdom
12	Halina Gordon / Jacek Tascher	Poland
13	Martine Olivier / Yves Tarayre	France
14	Jindra Holá / Karol Foltán	Czechoslovakia
15	Regula Lattmann / Hanspeter Müller	Switzerland
16	Gabriella Remport / Sándor Nagy	Hungary
17	Claudia Koch / Peter Schubl	Austria
