= 1978 European Figure Skating Championships =

Figure skating competition

1978 European Championships
- Type: ISU Championship
- Date: January 31 – February 5
- Season: 1977–78
- Location: Strasbourg, France
- Venue: Hall Rhénus

Champions
- Men's singles: (East Germany) Jan Hoffmann
- Ladies' singles: (East Germany) Anett Pötzsch
- Pairs: (Soviet Union) Irina Rodnina / Alexander Zaitsev
- Ice dance: (Soviet Union) Irina Moiseeva / Andrei Minenkov
- Previous: 1977 European Championships
- Next: 1979 European Championships

The 1978 European Figure Skating Championships was a senior-level international competition held in Strasbourg, France from January 31 to February 5. Elite senior-level figure skaters from European ISU member nations competed for the title of European Champion in the disciplines of men's singles, ladies' singles, pair skating, and ice dancing.

== Competition notes ==
15-year-old Denise Biellmann became the first female skater to land the triple lutz in competition. She underrotated it, with two-foot landing. At the same event, she became the first woman to receive a 6.0 in technical merit, receiving the score from British judge Pauline Borrajo. She was 12th in figures, first in the free skating, and finished fourth overall. Another triple lutz was performed only by Jan Hoffmann.

== Results ==
=== Men ===
Rank	Name	Nation	CF	SP	FS
1	Jan Hoffmann	East Germany	2	2	
2	Vladimir Kovalev	Soviet Union	1	3	
3	Robin Cousins	United Kingdom	5	1	
4	Igor Bobrin	Soviet Union	3	4	
5	Yuri Ovchinnikov	Soviet Union			
6	Mario Liebers	East Germany			
7	Rudi Cerne	West Germany			
8	Miroslav Šoška	Czechoslovakia			
9	Gerd-Walter Gräbner	West Germany			
10	Gilles Beyer	France			
11	Grzegorz Głowania	Poland			
12	Andrew Bestwick	United Kingdom			
13	Thomas Öberg	Sweden			
14	Bruno Watschinger	Austria			
15	Matjaž Krušec	Yugoslavia			
16	Francis Demarteau	Belgium			
17	Jan Glerup	Denmark			
WD	Helmut Kristofics-Binder	Austria			

=== Ladies ===
Rank	Name	Nation
1	Anett Pötzsch	East Germany
2	Dagmar Lurz	West Germany
3	Elena Vodorezova	Soviet Union
4	Denise Biellmann	Switzerland
5	Susanna Driano	Italy
6	Kristiina Wegelius	Finland
7	Carola Weißenberg	East Germany
8	Danielle Rieder	Switzerland
9	Natalia Strelkova	Soviet Union
10	Karena Richardson	United Kingdom
11	Renata Baierová	Czechoslovakia
12	Karin Riediger	West Germany
13	Zhanna Ilina	Soviet Union
14	Garnet Ostermeier	West Germany
15	Susan Broman	Finland
16	Sanda Dubravčić	Yugoslavia
17	Astrid Jansen in de Wal	Netherlands
18	Franca Bianconi	Italy
19	Cecile Antonelli	France
20	Christina Svensson	Sweden
21	Helena Chwila	Poland
22	Patricia Fiorucci	Italy

=== Pairs ===
Rank	Name	Nation
1	Irina Rodnina / Alexander Zaitsev	Soviet Union
2	Marina Cherkasova / Sergei Shakhrai	Soviet Union
3	Manuela Mager / Uwe Bewersdorf	East Germany
4	Sabine Baeß / Tassilo Thierbach	East Germany
5	Ingrid Spieglová / Alan Spiegl	Czechoslovakia
6	Kerstin Stolfig / Veit Kempe	East Germany
7	Marina Pestova / Stanislav Leonovich	Soviet Union
8	Susanne Scheibe / Andreas Nischwitz	West Germany
9	Sabine Fuchs / Xavier Videau	France
10	Elżbieta Łuczyńska / Marek Chrolenko	Poland
11	Gabriele Beck / Jochen Stahl	West Germany
12	Catherine Brunet / Philippe Brunet	France

=== Ice dancing ===
Rank	Name	Nation
1	Irina Moiseeva / Andrei Minenkov	Soviet Union
2	Natalia Linichuk / Gennadi Karponosov	Soviet Union
3	Krisztina Regőczy / András Sallay	Hungary
4	Janet Thompson / Warren Maxwell	United Kingdom
5	Liliana Řeháková / Stanislav Drastich	Czechoslovakia
6	Marina Zueva / Andrei Vitman	Soviet Union
7	Kay Barsdell / Kenneth Foster	United Kingdom
8	Isabella Rizzi / Luigi Freroni	Italy
9	Jayne Torvill / Christopher Dean	United Kingdom
10	Susi Handschmann / Peter Handschmann	Austria
11	Henriette Fröschl / Christian Steiner	West Germany
12	Halina Gordon / Jacek Tascher	Poland
13	Muriel Boucher / Yves Malatier	France
14	Elisabetta Parisi / Marco Gobbo	Italy
15	Elisabeth Luksch / Peter Schubl	Switzerland
16	Rita Karpat / Istvan Palasthy	Hungary
WD	Jolanta Wesołowska / Andrzej Alberciak	Poland
