= Jutta Müller =

German figure skating coach (1928–2023)

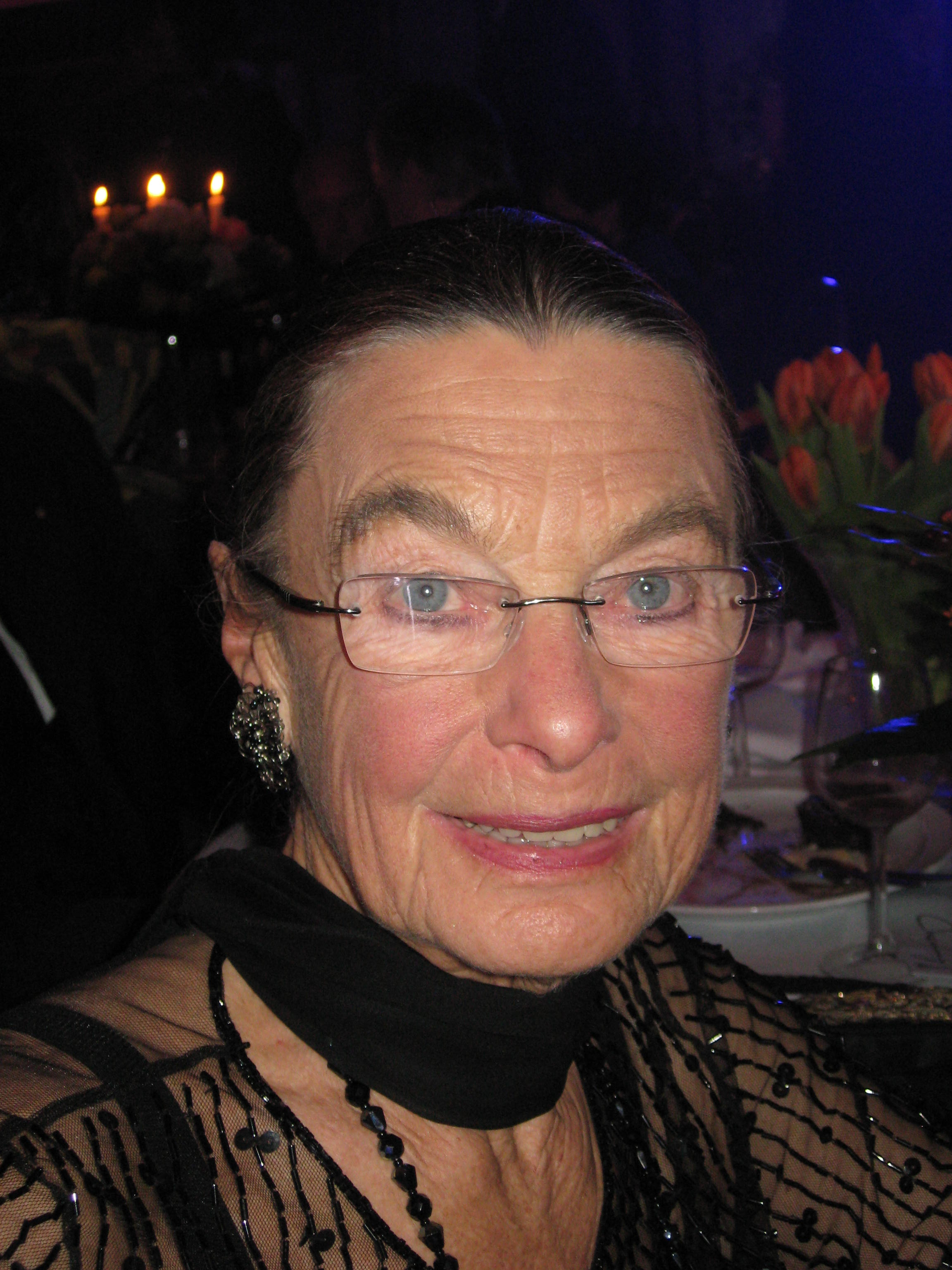
- Müller in 2009

Personal information
- Other names: Jutta Lötzsch
- Born: 13 December 1928 Chemnitz, Saxony, Germany
- Died: 2 November 2023 (aged 94) Bernau bei Berlin, Brandenburg, Germany

Figure skating career
- Country: East Germany

Jutta Müller (née Lötzsch; 13 December 1928 – 2 November 2023) was a German figure skater and one of the most successful figure skating coaches worldwide.

== Personal life ==
Jutta Lötzsch was born in Chemnitz on 13 December 1928, to Marie Lötzsch (née Prusky) and Emil Lötzsch, the 1930 Saxony champion in wrestling. Her first marriage was to Wolfgang Seyfert. They had a daughter, Gabriele Seyfert, before divorcing. Her second husband was Bringfried Müller (1931–2016), an East German football player.

Müller died in Bernau bei Berlin on 2 November 2023, at the age of 94.

== Career ==
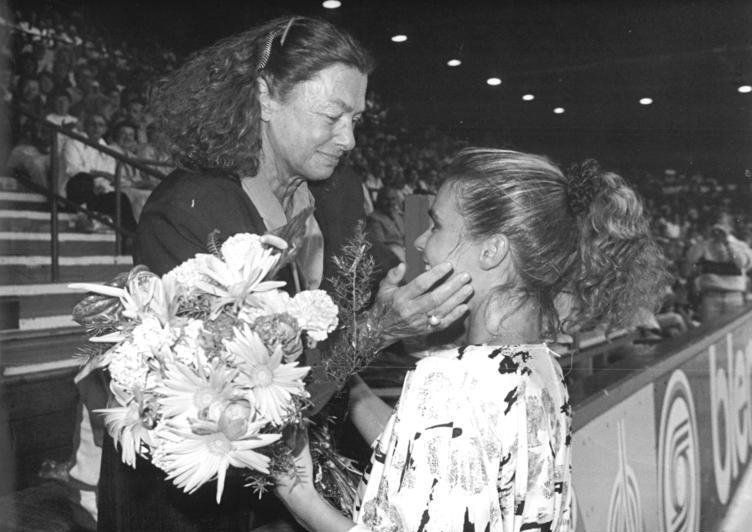
Müller (left) with Katarina Witt in 1988

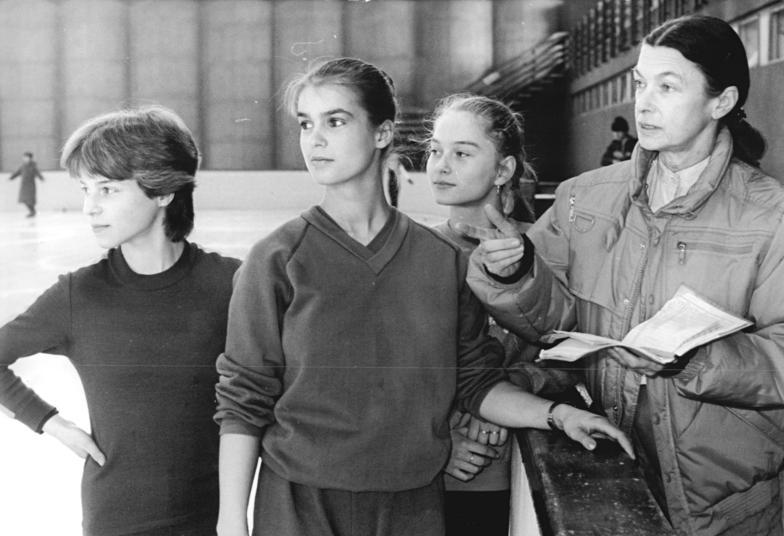
Left to right: Simone Lang, Katarina Witt, Constanze Gensel and Müller in 1984

In 1949, Müller won the East German Championships in women's pair skating with partner Irene Salzmann. This category was created because of the lack of men in Germany after World War II. In 1953, she won the ladies' singles bronze medal at the East German nationals.

After World War II, Müller became a teacher of German and sports. In 1946, she became a member of the SED, the former East German communist party. She studied at the Deutsche Hochschule für Körperkultur in Leipzig, and in 1955 she began coaching figure skating.

Müller's first student was her own daughter Gabriele Seyfert, who twice won the World Championships (1969 and 1970). She also coached, among men, Günter Zöller, Jan Hoffmann, Nils Köpp, Rico Krahnert and Ronny Winkler; and, among women, Sonja Morgenstern, Anett Pötzsch, Katarina Witt, Evelyn Großmann, Martina Clausner, Marion Weber, Constanze Gensel and Simone Lang. Altogether, her students won three Olympic gold medals and ten world championship titles. In comparison, Carlo Fassi's students won four Olympic gold medals and eight world championship titles.

In 2004, Müller was admitted into the World Figure Skating Hall of Fame.

She is commemorated in Chemnitz, her home town, by the Jutta Müller Eissportzentrum in Küchwald, formerly the Eissportzentrum Chemnitz, originally a roller-skating rink but developed for ice sports in several stages over a period of years from 1954–55 onwards, and renamed in Müller's honour in March 2024.

== Sources ==
- Eiskunstlauftrainerin erinnert
- various German newspapers, collected over 60 years
