= 1980 European Figure Skating Championships =

Figure skating competition

1980 European Championships
- Type: ISU Championship
- Date: 22 – 27 January
- Season: 1979–80
- Location: Gothenburg, Sweden
- Venue: Scandinavium

Champions
- Men's singles: (United Kingdom) Robin Cousins
- Ladies' singles: (East Germany) Anett Pötzsch
- Pairs: (Soviet Union) Irina Rodnina / Alexander Zaitsev
- Ice dance: (Soviet Union) Natalia Linichuk / Gennadi Karponosov
- Previous: 1979 European Championships
- Next: 1981 European Championships

The 1980 European Figure Skating Championships was a senior-level international competition held at the Scandinavium in Gothenburg, Sweden on 22–27 January. Elite senior-level figure skaters from European ISU member nations competed for the title of European Champion in the disciplines of men's singles, ladies' singles, pair skating, and ice dancing.

== Results ==
=== Men ===
Rank	Name	Nation	CF	SP	FS
1	Robin Cousins	United Kingdom	3	3	1
2	Jan Hoffmann	East Germany	2	1	
3	Vladimir Kovalev	Soviet Union	1	2	
4	Igor Bobrin	Soviet Union			
5	Hermann Schulz	East Germany			
6	Jean-Christophe Simond	France			
7	Mario Liebers	East Germany			
8	Konstantin Kokora	Soviet Union			
9	Jozef Sabovčík	Czechoslovakia			
10	Thomas Öberg	Sweden			
11	Patrice Macrez	France			
12	Helmut Kristofics-Binder	Austria			
13	Gilles Beyer	France			
14	Bruno Delmaestro	Italy			
15	Ludwik Jankowski	Poland			
16	Antti Kontiola	Finland			
17	Eric Krol	Belgium			
18	Miljan Begović	Yugoslavia			
19	István Simon	Hungary			
20	Boyko Aleksiev	Bulgaria			
WD	Rudi Cerne	West Germany			

=== Ladies ===
Rank	Name	Nation
1	Anett Pötzsch	East Germany
2	Dagmar Lurz	West Germany
3	Susanna Driano	Italy
4	Kristiina Wegelius	Finland
5	Sanda Dubravčić	Yugoslavia
6	Deborah Cottrill	United Kingdom
7	Carola Weißenberg	East Germany
8	Danielle Rieder	Switzerland
9	Karin Riediger	West Germany
10	Renata Baierová	Czechoslovakia
11	Kira Ivanova	Soviet Union
12	Karena Richardson	United Kingdom
13	Katarina Witt	East Germany
14	Susan Broman	Finland
15	Editha Dotson	Belgium
16	Myriam Oberwiler	Switzerland
17	Anne-Sophie de Kristoffy	France
18	Astrid Jansen in de Wal	Netherlands
19	Pia Snellman	Finland
20	Bodil Olsson	Sweden
21	Maristella Maderna	Italy
22	Nevenka Lisak	Yugoslavia
23	Hanne Gamborg	Denmark
24	Gloria Mas	Spain
WD	Claudia Kristofics-Binder	Austria
WD	Christina Riegel	West Germany
WD	Denise Biellmann	Switzerland

=== Pairs ===
Rank	Name	Nation	TFP	SP	FS
1	Irina Rodnina / Alexander Zaitsev	Soviet Union	1.5	1	1
2	Marina Cherkasova / Sergei Shakhrai	Soviet Union	3.0	2	2
3	Marina Pestova / Stanislav Leonovich	Soviet Union	5.0	4	3
4	Sabine Baeß / Tassilo Thierbach	East Germany	6.5	5	4
5	Manuela Mager / Uwe Bewersdorf	East Germany	6.5	3	5
6	Christina Riegel / Andreas Nischwitz	West Germany	9.5	7	6
7	Kerstin Stolfig / Veit Kempe	East Germany	10.0	6	7
8	Ingrid Spieglová / Alan Spiegl	Czechoslovakia	12.0	8	8
9	Gabrielle Beck / Jochen Stahl	West Germany	15.5	9	11
10	Maria Jeżak / Lech Matuszewski	Poland	14.5	11	9
11	Susan Garland / Robert Daw	United Kingdom	15.0	10	10

=== Ice dancing ===
Rank	Name	Nation
1	Natalia Linichuk / Gennadi Karponosov	Soviet Union
2	Krisztina Regőczy / András Sallay	Hungary
3	Irina Moiseeva / Andrei Minenkov	Soviet Union
4	Jayne Torvill / Christopher Dean	United Kingdom
5	Liliana Řeháková / Stanislav Drastich	Czechoslovakia
6	Natalia Bestemianova / Andrei Bukin	Soviet Union
7	Henriette Fröschl / Christian Steiner	West Germany
8	Karen Barber / Nicholas Slater	United Kingdom
9	Susi Handschmann / Peter Handschmann	Switzerland
10	Anna Pisánská / Jiří Musil	Czechoslovakia
11	Nathalie Hervé / Pierre Béchu	France
12	Gabriella Remport / Sándor Nagy	Hungary
13	Elisabette Parisi / Roberto Pelizzola	Italy
14	Birgit Goller / Peter Klisch	West Germany
15	Regula Lattmann / Hanspeter Müller	Switzerland
