= 1980 World Figure Skating Championships =

Annual figure skating competition held in 1980

- Type: ISU Championship
- Date: 11–16 March
- Season: 1979–80
- Location: Dortmund, West Germany
- Venue: Westfalenhallen

Champions
- Men's singles: (East Germany) Jan Hoffmann
- Ladies' singles: (East Germany) Anett Pötzsch
- Pairs: (Soviet Union) Marina Cherkasova / Sergei Shakhrai
- Ice dance: (Hungary) Krisztina Regőczy / András Sallay
- Previous: 1979 World Championships
- Next: 1981 World Championships

The 1980 World Figure Skating Championships were held in Dortmund, West Germany, 11–16 March. At the event, sanctioned by the International Skating Union, medals were awarded in men's singles, ladies' singles, pair skating, and ice dance.

== Medal tables ==
=== Medalists ===
Discipline	Gold	Silver	Bronze
Men	(East Germany) Jan Hoffmann	(United Kingdom) Robin Cousins	(United States) Charles Tickner
Ladies	(East Germany) Anett Pötzsch	(West Germany) Dagmar Lurz	(United States) Linda Fratianne
Pair skating	(Soviet Union) Marina Cherkasova / Sergei Shakhrai	(East Germany) Manuela Mager / Uwe Bewersdorf	(Soviet Union) Marina Pestova / Stanislav Leonovich
Ice dance	(Hungary) Krisztina Regőczy / András Sallay	(Soviet Union) Natalia Linichuk / Gennadi Karponosov	(Soviet Union) Irina Moiseyeva / Andrei Minenkov

=== Medals by country ===
Rank	Nation	Gold	Silver	Bronze	Total
1	East Germany (GDR)	2	1	0	3
2	Soviet Union (URS)	1	1	2	4
3	Hungary (HUN)	1	0	0	1
4	Great Britain (GBR)	0	1	0	1
4	West Germany (FRG)	0	1	0	1
6	United States (USA)	0	0	2	2
Totals (6 entries)		4	4	4	12

== Results ==
=== Men ===
Rank	Name	Nation	CP	SP	FS	SP+FS	Points	Placings
1	Jan Hoffmann	East Germany	1	2	2	2	189.94	11
2	Robin Cousins	United Kingdom	5	1	1	1	188.82	17
3	Charles Tickner	United States	3	7	3	3	185.12	30
4	David Santee	United States	2	3	6	5	185.16	32
5	Scott Hamilton	United States	8	5	4	4	179.94	49
6	Mitsuru Matsumura	Japan	9	6	5	6	177.14	58
7	Igor Bobrin	Soviet Union	6	4	8	7	176.66	59
8	Fumio Igarashi	Japan	13	10	7	8	171.86	82
9	Brian Pockar	Canada	10	9	10	10	171.56	83
10	Hermann Schulz	East Germany	7	8	11	11	171.08	88
11	Rudi Cerne	West Germany	12	11	9	9	170.60	91
12	Mario Liebers	East Germany	11	12	12	12	166.86	108
13	Jean-Christophe Simond	France	4	14	16	15	164.56	115
14	Alexander Fadeev	Soviet Union	16	15	14	14	158.84	129
15	Grzegorz Filipowski	Poland	18	13	13	13	160.12	129
16	Jozef Sabovčík	Czechoslovakia	14	16	15	16	155.82	142
17	William Schober	Australia	19	19	17	17	144.60	161
18	Helmut Kristofics-Binder	Austria	17	20	19	19	142.90	166
19	Thomas Öberg	Sweden	15	18	20	20	142.44	167
20	Eric Krol	Belgium	21	17	18	18	140.32	172
21	Miljan Begovic	Yugoslavia	20	21	21	21	127.68	189
22	Wang Zhili	China	22	22	22	22	111.56	198

Referee:

- Sonia Bianchetti Italy

Assistant Referee:

- Benjamin T. Wright United States

Judges:

- Geoffrey Yates United Kingdom
- Tatiana Danilenko Soviet Union
- Jane Sullivan United States
- David Dore Canada
- Walburga Grimm East Germany
- Eva von Gamm West Germany
- Monique Georgelin France
- Tsukasa Kimura Japan
- Marie-Louise von Friedrichs Sweden
- Václav Skála Czechoslovakia

=== Ladies ===
*: better placed due to the majority of the better placings

Rank	Name	Nation	CP	SP	FS	SP+FS	Points	Placings
1	Anett Pötzsch	East Germany	1	6	2	4	188.38	12
2	Dagmar Lurz	West Germany	2	4	5	5	186.22	23*
3	Linda Fratianne	United States	4	3	1	1	187.04	22
4	Emi Watanabe	Japan	5	2	3	2	184.82	33
5	Claudia Kristofics-Binder	Austria	3	7	9	9	180.48	47
6	Denise Biellmann	Switzerland	10	1	6	3	178.56	57
7	Lisa-Marie Allen	United States	8	5	8	8	178.22	58
8	Kristiina Wegelius	Finland	6	11	12	13	172.68	79
9	Deborah Cottrill	United Kingdom	9	8	14	10	172.14	85
10	Katarina Witt	East Germany	20	9	7	7	170.86	95*
11	Elaine Zayak	United States	22	10	4	6	170.70	94
12	Sanda Dubravčić	Yugoslavia	12	12	11	11	169.30	107
13	Carola Weißenberg	East Germany	13	14	13	12	168.68	111
14	Tracey Wainman	Canada	21	17	10	14	164.00	128
15	Sonja Stanek	Austria	16	22	16	16	158.90	142
16	Renata Baierová	Czechoslovakia	23	19	15	15	158.20	143
17	Susan Broman	Finland	17	16	18	17	156.68	158
18	Anne-Sophie de Kristoffy	France	14	21	19	20	155.72	160
19	Christina Riegel	West Germany	18	26	17	18	154.90	164
20	Yoko Yakushi	Japan	25	18	21	19	151.48	179
21	Reiko Kobayashi	Japan	19	25	22	21	150.74	188
22	Anita Siegfried	Switzerland	26	23	20	22	147.98	194
23	Bodil Olsson	Sweden	28	24	23	23	144.64	208
24	Belinda Coulthard	Australia	27	27	24	24	140.82	216
25	Rudina Pasveer	Netherlands	24	28	26	25	136.12	222
26	Barbara Toffolo	Italy	30	29	27	26	129.60	237
27	Hanne Gamborg	Denmark	29	31	25	27	128.52	240
28	Shin Hea-sook	South Korea	31	32	28	29	119.50	255
29	Liu Zhiying	China	32	30	29	28	117.56	258
WD	Danielle Rieder	Switzerland	7	13				
WD	Elena Vodorezova	Soviet Union	11	15				
WD	Karin Riediger	West Germany	15	20				

Referee:

- Elemér Terták Hungary

Assistant Referee:

- Donald H. Gilchrist Canada

Judges:

- Yvonne Tutt United States
- Ludwig Gassner Austria
- Liudmila Kubashevskaia Soviet Union
- Giorgio Siniscalco Italy
- Jürg Wilhelm Switzerland
- Ingrid Linke East Germany
- Junko Hiramatsu Japan
- Elsbeth Bon Netherlands
- Gerhard Frey West Germany
- Hely Abbondati Finland

=== Pairs ===
Rank	Name	Nation	SP	FS	Points	Placings
1	Marina Cherkasova / Sergei Shakhrai	Soviet Union	1	1	144.64	10
2	Manuela Mager / Uwe Bewersdorf	East Germany	2	2	142.92	20
3	Marina Pestova / Stanislav Leonovich	Soviet Union	3	3	141.08	25
4	Sabine Baeß / Tassilo Thierbach	East Germany	4	4	138.98	38
5	Christina Riegel / Andreas Nischwitz	West Germany	6	5	135.92	46
6	Veronika Pershina / Marat Akbarov	Soviet Union	5	7	134.32	55
7	Kitty Carruthers / Peter Carruthers	United States	8	6	134.10	58
8	Ingrid Spieglová / Alan Spiegl	Czechoslovakia	7	8	130.56	76
9	Cornelia Haufe / Kersten Bellmann	East Germany	9	10	128.14	84
10	Sheryl Franks / Michael Botticelli	United States	10	11	127.68	90
11	Barbara Underhill / Paul Martini	Canada	11	9	127.86	91
12	Yukiko Okabe / Takashi Mura	Japan	12	13	119.74	113
13	Susan Garland / Robert Daw	United Kingdom	13	12	119.06	115
14	Elizabeth Cain / Peter Cain	Australia	14	14	116.38	123
15	Luan Bo / Yao Bin	China	15	15	88.06	135

Referee:

- Oskar Madl Austria

Assistant Referee:

- Eugen Romminger West Germany

Judges:

- Tiasha Andrée Yugoslavia
- Liudmila Kubashevskaya Soviet Union
- Sally-Anne Stapleford United Kingdom
- Václav Skála Czechoslovakia
- Audrey Williams Canada
- Junko Hiramatsu Japan
- Helga von Wiecki East Germany
- Willi Wenz West Germany
- Mary Louise Wright United States
- Thérèse Maisel France

=== Ice dance ===
Rank	Name	Nation	CD	FD	Points	Placings
1	Krisztina Regőczy / András Sallay	Hungary	2	1	205.58	13
2	Natalia Linichuk / Gennadi Karponosov	Soviet Union	1	3	204.50	18
3	Irina Moiseeva / Andrei Minenkov	Soviet Union	3	2	202.42	24
4	Jayne Torvill / Christopher Dean	United Kingdom	4	4	199.12	35
5	Lorna Wighton / John Dowding	Canada	5	6	195.18	48
6	Judy Blumberg / Michael Seibert	United States	6	5	194.12	52
7	Natalia Karamysheva / Rostislav Sinitsyn	Soviet Union	7	7	189.66	63
8	Stacey Smith / John Summers	United States	8	8	187.12	72
9	Henriette Fröschl / Christian Steiner	West Germany	9	9	184.02	80
10	Karen Barber / Nicky Slater	United Kingdom	10	10	178.94	92
11	Jana Berankova / Jan Bartak	Czechoslovakia	11	11	176.16	97
12	Nathalie Herve / Pierre Bechu	France	12	12	171.24	108
13	Marie McNeil / Robert McCall	Canada	13	13	168.58	116
14	Jindra Holá / Karol Foltán	Czechoslovakia	14	15	162.60	132
15	Noriko Sato / Tadeyuki Takahashi	Japan	15	14	162.02	133
16	Gabriella Remport / Sándor Nagy	Hungary	16	16	159.52	142
17	Paola Casalotti / Sergio Ceserani	Italy	17	17	158.50	150

Referee:

- Lawrence Demmy United Kingdom

Assistant Referee:

- Erika Schiechtl West Germany

Judges:

- Oskar Urban Czechoslovakia
- Elaine DeMore United States
- Willi Wenz West Germany
- Ferenc Kertész Hungary
- Lysiane Lauret France
- Pamela Davis United Kingdom
- Igor Kabanov Soviet Union
- Suzanne Francis Canada
- Tsukasa Kimura Japan
- Cia Bordogna Italy
