= Gennadi Karponosov =

Russian figure skater (born 1950)

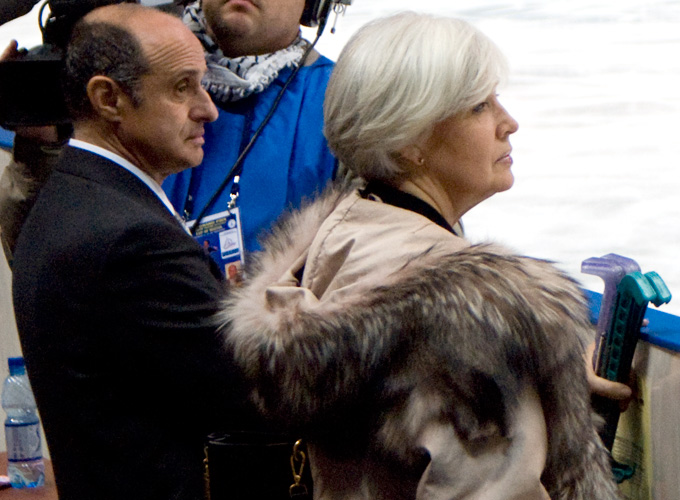
- Karponosov with Linichuk in 2010

Personal information
- Full name: Gennadi Mikhailovich Karponosov
- Other names: Karponossov
- Born: 21 November 1950 (age 75) Moscow, Russian SFSR, Soviet Union
- Height: 1.73 m (5 ft 8 in)

Figure skating career
- Country: Soviet Union
- Partner: Natalia Linichuk; Elena Zharkova
- Coach: Elena Tchaikovskaia; Tatiana Tarasova
- Skating club: IceWorks
- Retired: 1981
Medal record
Figure skating: Ice dancing
Representing Soviet Union
Olympic Games
Gold medal – first place	1980 Lake Placid	Ice dancing
World Championships
Silver medal – second place	1980 Dortmund	Ice dancing
Gold medal – first place	1979 Vienna	Ice dancing
Gold medal – first place	1978 Ottawa	Ice dancing
Bronze medal – third place	1977 Tokyo	Ice dancing
Bronze medal – third place	1974 Munich	Ice dancing
European Championships
Bronze medal – third place	1981 Innsbruck	Ice dancing
Gold medal – first place	1980 Gothenburg	Ice dancing
Gold medal – first place	1979 Zagreb	Ice dancing
Silver medal – second place	1978 Strasbourg	Ice dancing
Bronze medal – third place	1977 Helsinki	Ice dancing
Bronze medal – third place	1976 Geneva	Ice dancing
Bronze medal – third place	1975 Copenhagen	Ice dancing
Bronze medal – third place	1974 Zagreb	Ice dancing

Gennadi Mikhailovich Karponosov (Russian: Геннадий Михайлович Карпоносов; born 21 November 1950) is an ice dancing coach and a former competitive ice dancer for the Soviet Union. With Natalia Linichuk, he is the 1980 Olympic champion and a two-time World champion.

== Competitive career ==
Gennadi Karponosov began skating because Alexei Ulanov was his neighbor. He initially competed with Elena Zharkova under coach Tatiana Tarasova but had greater success with his second partner, Natalia Linichuk.

Linichuk and Karponosov were coached by Elena Tchaikovskaia at Dynamo in Moscow. They won the World Universiade in 1972, and won the bronze medal at the 1974 and 1977 World Championships. They were fourth at the 1976 Winter Olympics, the year ice dancing was introduced as an Olympic sport.

They won the bronze medals at the European Figure Skating Championships from 1974 through 1977 and a silver medal in 1978. Linichuk and Karponosov won the world championship in 1978 and 1979 and the European Championships in 1979 and 1980.

Linichuk and Karponosov won the 1980 Olympics, but failed to defend their World title, making them the only team ever to unsuccessfully defend a World title after winning the Olympics. In 1981, Linichuk and Karponosov retired from competition.

== Coaching career ==
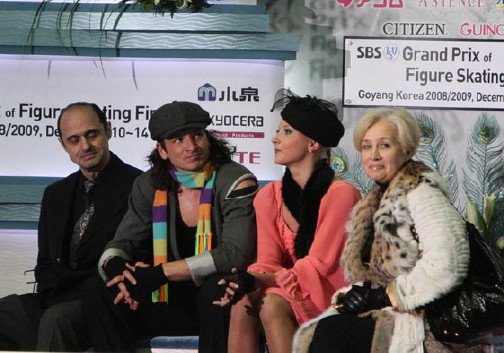
Karponosov and Linichuk in the Kiss and cry with students Domnina / Shabalin

After coaching in Moscow, Linichuk and Karponosov accepted an offer to coach in the U.S. They moved with their students in June 1994 and coached at the University of Delaware in Newark, Delaware. In September 2007, they moved to the Ice Works Skating Complex in Aston, Pennsylvania.

Their current and former senior-level students include:

- Tanith Belbin / Benjamin Agosto (coached from mid-2008 to 2010), 2009 World silver medalists for the U.S.
- Galit Chait / Sergei Sakhnovsky (World bronze medalists)
- Albena Denkova / Maxim Staviski (coached from mid-2005 to 2007), 2006, 2007 World Champions for Bulgaria.
- Oksana Domnina / Maxim Shabalin (coached from mid-2008 to 2010), 2010 Olympic bronze medalists for Russia.
- Oksana Grishuk / Evgeni Platov (Olympic and World champions)
- Natalia Gudina / Alexei Beletski
- Anjelika Krylova / Vladimir Fedorov (World bronze medalists)
- Anjelika Krylova / Oleg Ovsyannikov (World champions, Olympic silver medalists)
- Irina Lobacheva / Ilia Averbukh (World champions, Olympic silver medalists)

Their current and former junior-level students include:

- Lauri Bonacorsi / Travis Mager (from May 2010) 2011 U.S. Junior silver medalists
- Ekaterina Pushkash and Jonathan Guerreiro (coached from mid-2010 to present), 2011 World Junior silver medalists for Russia

== Personal life ==
Karponosov studied international relations at the Public Institute Moscow. Linichuk accepted Karponosov's proposal after they retired from competition. They were married on 31 July 1981. Their daughter, Anastasiya Karponosova, was born in February 1985. The couple initially lived in Moscow and then moved to the United States in the early 1990s.

In 2001, Karponosov, who is Jewish, was admitted to the International Jewish Sports Hall of Fame.

== Competitive highlights ==
=== With Linichuk ===
International
Event	72–73	73–74	74–75	75–76	76–77	77–78	78–79	79–80	80–81
Olympics				4th				1st	
Worlds		3rd	4th	5th	3rd	1st	1st	2nd	
Europeans		3rd	3rd	3rd	3rd	2nd	1st	1st	3rd
Skate Canada				1st	1st				
Moscow News	3rd	1st		2nd	2nd	2nd		1st	1st
National
Soviet Champ.			2nd	1st	2nd		1st		1st

=== With Zharkova ===
International
Event	1968–69	1969–70	1970–71	1971–72
World Championships		8th	8th	8th
European Championships	11th	6th	6th	6th
Prize of Moscow News		2nd	3rd	3rd
National
Soviet Championships	3rd	3rd	3rd	2nd

== See also ==
- List of select Jewish figure skaters
