= 1979 World Figure Skating Championships =

Annual figure skating competition held in 1979

- Type: ISU Championship
- Date: March 13 – March 18
- Season: 1978–79
- Location: Vienna, Austria
- Venue: Wiener Stadthalle

Champions
- Men's singles: (Soviet Union) Vladimir Kovalev
- Ladies' singles: (United States) Linda Fratianne
- Pairs: (United States) Tai Babilonia / Randy Gardner
- Ice dance: (Soviet Union) Natalia Linichuk / Gennadi Karponosov
- Previous: 1978 World Championships
- Next: 1980 World Championships

The 1979 World Figure Skating Championships were held in Vienna, Austria, 13–18 March. At the event, sanctioned by the International Skating Union, medals were awarded in men's singles, ladies' singles, pair skating, and ice dance.

== Medal tables ==
=== Medalists ===
Discipline	Gold	Silver	Bronze
Men's singles	(Soviet Union) Vladimir Kovalev	(United Kingdom) Robin Cousins	(East Germany) Jan Hoffmann
Ladies' singles	(United States) Linda Fratianne	(East Germany) Anett Pötzsch	(Japan) Emi Watanabe
Pair skating	(United States) Tai Babilonia / Randy Gardner	(Soviet Union) Marina Cherkasova / Sergei Shakhrai	(East Germany) Sabine Baeß / Tassilo Thierbach
Ice dance	(Soviet Union) Natalia Linichuk / Gennadi Karponosov	(Hungary) Krisztina Regőczy / András Sallay	(Soviet Union) Irina Moiseyeva / Andrei Minenkov

=== Medals by country ===
Rank	Nation	Gold	Silver	Bronze	Total
1	Soviet Union (URS)	2	1	1	4
2	United States (USA)	2	0	0	2
3	East Germany (GDR)	0	1	2	3
4	Great Britain (GBR)	0	1	0	1
4	Hungary (HUN)	0	1	0	1
6	Japan (JPN)	0	0	1	1
Totals (6 entries)		4	4	4	12

== Results ==
=== Men ===
Rank	Name	Nation	CP	SP	FS	SP+FS	Points	Places
1	Vladimir Kovalev	Soviet Union	2	1	4	2	185.80	17
2	Robin Cousins	United Kingdom	5	3	1	1	185.18	22
3	Jan Hoffmann	East Germany	1	5	3	4	185.10	23
4	Charles Tickner	United States	4	4	2	3	184.28	28
5	Scott Cramer	United States	8	2	6	6	178.04	52
6	Fumio Igarashi	Japan	10	8	5	5	177.06	57
7	Jean-Christophe Simond	France	6	12	7	7	175.58	67
8	David Santee	United States	3	13	10	10	174.58	71
9	Mitsuru Matsumura	Japan	11	10	8	8	172.74	83
10	Igor Bobrin	Soviet Union	7	11	12	12	172.04	87
11	Konstantin Kokora	Soviet Union	12	6	13	11	169.60	104
12	Hermann Schulz	East Germany	13	9	11	13	169.38	106
13	Brian Pockar	Canada	14	7	14	14	168.50	109
14	Mario Liebers	East Germany	9	14	15	15	166.54	120
15	Vern Taylor	Canada	20	15	9	9	163.62	133
16	Norbert Schramm	West Germany	15	16	19	17	156.44	147
17	Thomas Öberg	Sweden	18	17	16	16	153.10	157
18	Helmut Kristofics-Binder	Austria	16	20	18	19	151.78	162
19	Jozef Sabovčík	Czechoslovakia	17	18	20	20	148.16	175
20	Christopher Howarth	United Kingdom	21	19	17	18	148.62	175
21	William Schober	Australia	19	22	21	21	146.40	182
22	Matjaž Krušec	Yugoslavia	22	21	22	22	138.86	198

Referee:

- Sonia Bianchetti Italy

Assistant Referee:

- Benjamin T. Wright United States

Judges:

- Eva von Gamm West Germany
- Margaret Berezowski Canada
- Toshio Suzuki Japan
- Monique Georgelin France
- Yvonne Tutt United States
- Walburga Grimm East Germany
- Tatiana Danilenko Soviet Union
- Pamela Davis United Kingdom
- Tjasa Andrée Yugoslavia
- Václav Skála Czechoslovakia

=== Ladies ===
*: better placed due to the majority of the better placings

Rank	Name	Nation	CP	SP	FS	SP+FS	Points	Places
1	Linda Fratianne	United States	3	1	1	1	186.92	11
2	Anett Pötzsch	East Germany	1	5	3	3	184.36	18
3	Emi Watanabe	Japan	4	2	4	4	180.52	31
4	Dagmar Lurz	West Germany	2	4	8	6	179.96	33
5	Denise Biellmann	Switzerland	11	10	2	2	177.28	49
6	Lisa-Marie Allen	United States	8	7	5	5	176.68	54
7	Claudia Kristofics-Binder	Austria	5	6	9	7	175.44	63
8	Susanna Driano	Italy	6	3	14	9	173.46	70
9	Carola Weißenberg	East Germany	9	21	7	11	170.54	88
10	Kristiina Wegelius	Finland	7	8	18	15	169.26	98
11	Carrie Rugh	United States	12	11	11	10	169.34	97
12	Sanda Dubravčić	Yugoslavia	21	9	6	8	166.96	115
13	Natalia Strelkova	Soviet Union	14	20	15	16	164.94	134
14	Deborah Cottrill	United Kingdom	10	16	20	20	164.80	136
15	Karin Riediger	West Germany	15	12	16	17	164.50	142
16	Renata Baierová	Czechoslovakia	18	15	13	13	164.00	144
17	Petra Ernert	West Germany	19	19	12	14	163.24	149*
18	Kira Ivanova	Soviet Union	20	13	10	12	164.02	147
19	Janet Morrissey	Canada	17	17	17	18	162.04	162
20	Reiko Kobayashi	Japan	13	18	21	21	161.30	170*
21	Jeanne Chapman	Norway	16	14	19	19	161.80	166
22	Anita Siegfried	Switzerland	22	28	24	26	150.34	207
23	Astrid Jansen in de Wal	Netherlands	23	24	26	25	149.18	216
24	Franca Bianconi	Italy	26	23	22	22	149.04	218
25	Bodil Olsson	Sweden	30	26	23	23	147.02	225
26	Corinne Wyrsch	Switzerland	24	22	28	27	146.76	233
27	Kim Myo-sil	North Korea	27	25	25	24	145.48	237
28	Belinda Coulthard	Australia	25	27	27	28	145.92	238
29	Katie Symmonds	New Zealand	23	29	29	29	134.58	261
30	Shin Hea-sook	South Korea	29	30	31	30	120.44	270
31	Gloria Mas	Spain	31	31	30	31	112.28	279

Referee:

- Hermann Schiechtl West Germany

Assistant Referee:

- Martin Felsenreich Austria

Judges:

- Eugen Romminger West Germany
- Berit Aarnes Norway
- Evgenia Bogdanova Soviet Union
- Lena Vainio Finland
- Jürg Wilhelm Switzerland
- Giordano Abbondati Italy
- Ingrid Linke East Germany
- Jacqueline Kendall-Baker Australia
- Charles Foster United States
- Suzanne Francis Canada

=== Pairs ===
Rank	Name	Nation	SP	FS	Points	Places
1	Tai Babilonia / Randy Gardner	United States	1	1	144.54	12
2	Marina Cherkasova / Sergei Shakhrai	Soviet Union	2	2	142.22	16
3	Sabine Baeß / Tassilo Thierbach	East Germany	4	3	137.74	32
4	Irina Vorobieva / Igor Lisovski	Soviet Union	3	4	138.72	33
5	Marina Pestova / Stanislav Leonovich	Soviet Union	5	5	133.98	46
6	Vicki Heasley / Robert Wagenhoffer	United States	6	6	132.50	54
7	Cornelia Haufe / Kersten Bellmann	East Germany	7	10	128.98	70
8	Christina Riegel / Andreas Nischwitz	West Germany	9	8	128.56	75
9	Sheryl Franks / Michael Botticelli	United States	8	9	127.64	77
10	Kerstin Stolfig / Veit Kempe	East Germany	11	7	125.92	84
11	Barbara Underhill / Paul Martini	Canada	10	11	123.92	94
12	Gabriele Beck / Jochen Stahl	West Germany	14	12	117.62	114
13	Elizabeth Cain / Peter Cain	Australia	12	13	115.32	117
14	Kyoko Hagiwara / Hisao Ozaki	Japan	13	14	114.02	120

Referee:

- Elemér Terták Hungary

Assistant Referee:

- Emil Skákala Czechoslovakia

Judges:

- Thérèse Maisel France
- Liudmila Kubashevskaya Soviet Union
- Jacqueline Kendall-Baker Australia
- Günter Teichmann East Germany
- Mary Louise Wright United States
- Willi Wernz West Germany
- Oskar Urban Czechoslovakia
- Junko Hiramatsu Japan
- Suzanne Fancis Canada
- Pamela Davis United Kingdom
- Giordano Abbondati Italy

=== Ice dance ===
* better placed due to the majority of the better placings

Rank	Name	Nation	CD	FD	Points	Places
1	Natalia Linichuk / Gennadi Karponosov	Soviet Union	1	1	207.86	9
2	Krisztina Regőczy / András Sallay	Hungary	2	2	204.10	22
3	Irina Moiseeva / Andrei Minenkov	Soviet Union	3	3	203.74	23
4	Liliana Řeháková / Stanislav Drastich	Czechoslovakia	4	4	196.94	36
5	Janet Thompson / Warren Maxwell	United Kingdom	5	5	194.00	51
6	Lorna Wighton / John Dowding	Canada	6	6	192.70	52
7	Susi Handschmann / Peter Handschmann	Austria	7	7	188.72	65
8	Jayne Torvill / Christopher Dean	United Kingdom	8	8	187.84	71
9	Stacey Smith / John Summers	United States	9	10	185.70	81
10	Natalia Bestemianova / Andrei Bukin	Soviet Union	11	9	184.06	87
11	Carol Fox / Richard Dalley	United States	10	11	180.30	98
12	Henriette Fröschl / Christian Steiner	West Germany	12	12	175.50	108
13	Karen Barber / Nicky Slater	United Kingdom	13	13	169.74	121
14	Anna Pisánská / Jiří Musil	Czechoslovakia	14	14	168.70	124
15	Patricia Fletcher / Michael de la Penotiere	Canada	15	15	165.24	134
16	Martine Olivier / Yves Tarayre	France	16	16	161.44	145
17	Jindra Holá / Karol Foltán	Czechoslovakia	18	17	157.64	157
18	Gabriella Remport / Sándor Nagy	Hungary	17	18	158.26	157
19	Yumiko Kage / Tadayuki Takahashi	Japan	19	19	153.30	175*
20	Claudia Koch / Peter Schübl	Austria	20	20	151.94	174

Referee:

- Hans Kutschera Austria

Assistant Referee:

- Lawrence Demmy United Kingdom

Judges:

- Igor Kabanov Soviet Union
- Brenda Long United Kingdom
- Pál Vásárhelyi Hungary
- Gerhard Frey West Germany
- Lysiane Lauret France
- Virginia Le Fevre United States
- Dennis McFarlane Canada
- Rudolf Zorn Austria
- Gerhardt Bubnik Czechoslovakia
- Tsukasa Kimura Japan
