= Jan Hoffmann =

East German figure skater

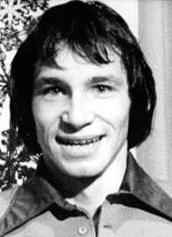
- Jan Hoffmann in 1975

Personal information
- Full name: Jan Hoffmann
- Born: 26 October 1955 (age 70) Dresden, East Germany
- Height: 1.78 m (5 ft 10 in)

Figure skating career
- Country: East Germany
- Skating club: SC Einheit Dresden
Medal record
Representing East Germany
Figure skating: Men's singles
Winter Olympics
Silver medal – second place	1980 Lake Placid	Men's singles
World Championships
Gold medal – first place	1980 Dortmund	Men's singles
Bronze medal – third place	1979 Vienna	Men's singles
Silver medal – second place	1978 Ottawa	Men's singles
Silver medal – second place	1977 Tokyo	Men's singles
Bronze medal – third place	1976 Gothenburg	Men's singles
Gold medal – first place	1974 Munich	Men's singles
Bronze medal – third place	1973 Bratislava	Men's singles
European Championships
Silver medal – second place	1980 Gothenburg	Men's singles
Gold medal – first place	1979 Zagreb	Men's singles
Gold medal – first place	1978 Strasbourg	Men's singles
Gold medal – first place	1977 Helsinki	Men's singles
Bronze medal – third place	1976 Geneva	Men's singles
Gold medal – first place	1974 Zagreb	Men's singles
Bronze medal – third place	1973 Cologne	Men's singles

Jan Hoffmann (born 26 October 1955) is a German figure skater who represented East Germany in competition. A four-time Olympian, he is the 1980 Olympic silver medalist, the 1974 & 1980 World Champion, and a four-time (1974, 1977–1979) European Champion.

== Personal life ==
Jan Hoffmann was born on 26 October 1955 in Dresden, East Germany. He is married and has one daughter.

== Career ==
=== Competitive ===
Hoffmann's first coach was Annemarie Halbach in Dresden. He later switched to Jutta Müller in Karl-Marx-Stadt (today Chemnitz). He represented the former East Germany in competition. He was one of a handful of figure skaters who rotated clockwise, landing on his left foot.

At the age of 12, Hoffmann competed at the 1968 Winter Olympics in Grenoble and placed 26th. He finished sixth at the 1972 Winter Olympics in Sapporo, having ranked fourth in figures and tenth in the free skate.

Hoffmann's first gold medal at an ISU Championship came at the 1974 European Championships in Zagreb, where he defeated Sergey Volkov of the Soviet Union and John Curry of the United Kingdom. At the 1974 World Championships in Munich, he placed first in figures, second in the short program, and fifth in the free skate. Technically gifted, he landed a triple Lutz in the free skate, the most difficult triple jump done at the time. Finishing ahead of Volkov and Canada's Toller Cranston, he stood atop the world podium for the first time. Later that year, he injured his knee on the trampoline. He had surgery on his meniscus and subsequently missed the entire 1974–75 season.

Hoffmann finished fourth at the 1976 Winter Olympics in Innsbruck after placing fourth in figures, ninth in the short program, and fifth in the free skate.

At the 1979 European Championships in Zagreb, Hoffmann finished ahead of the Soviet Union's Vladimir Kovalyov and the United Kingdom's Robin Cousins to win his fourth continental title. He took bronze behind the same skaters at the 1979 World Championships in Vienna.

In January 1980, Hoffmann placed second to Cousins at the European Championships in Gothenburg. The 1980 Winter Olympics took place in February in Lake Placid, New York. In his fourth Olympics, Hoffmann ranked first in figures, second in the short, and second in the free, winning the silver medal behind Cousins and ahead of Charles Tickner of the United States. He ended his amateur career in March at the 1980 World Championships in Dortmund. Ranked first in figures and second in the next two segments, he finished ahead of Cousins and Tickner and was awarded his second World title.

=== Post-competitive ===
Hoffmann studied medicine and became an orthopaedic specialist. He served on the managing board of the Deutsche Eislauf-Union and has appeared as a figure skating judge. He judged the ladies' event at the 1994 Winter Olympics and was one of five judges who placed Oksana Baiul ahead of Nancy Kerrigan. Hoffman also judged the ladies competition at the 1998 Winter Olympics and gave his first-place ordinal to Michelle Kwan.

== Results ==
Event	67–68	68–69	69–70	70–71	71–72	72–73	73–74	74–75	75–76	76–77	77–78	78–79	79–80
Winter Olympics	26th				6th				4th				2nd
World Championships			10th	4th	6th	3rd	1st		3rd	2nd	2nd	3rd	1st
European Championships	21st	16th	9th	4th		3rd	1st		3rd	1st	1st	1st	2nd
Skate America													3rd
Prize of Moscow News			4th										
East German Championships		2nd	2nd	1st	2nd	1st	1st		1st	1st	1st	1st	1st
