= Natalia Linichuk =

Russian ice dancer and coach

Natalya Linichuk
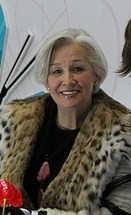

Personal information
- Full name: Natalya Vladimirovna Linichuk
- Born: 6 February 1956 (age 70) Moscow, Russian SFSR, Soviet Union
- Height: 1.65 m (5 ft 5 in)

Figure skating career
- Country: Soviet Union
- Partner: Gennadi Karponosov
- Coach: Elena Tchaikovskaia
- Retired: 1981
Medal record
Figure skating: Ice dancing
Representing Soviet Union
Olympic Games
Gold medal – first place	1980 Lake Placid	Ice dancing
World Championships
Silver medal – second place	1980 Dortmund	Ice dancing
Gold medal – first place	1979 Vienna	Ice dancing
Gold medal – first place	1978 Ottawa	Ice dancing
Bronze medal – third place	1977 Tokyo	Ice dancing
Bronze medal – third place	1974 Munich	Ice dancing
European Championships
Bronze medal – third place	1981 Innsbruck	Ice dancing
Gold medal – first place	1980 Gothenburg	Ice dancing
Gold medal – first place	1979 Zagreb	Ice dancing
Silver medal – second place	1978 Strasbourg	Ice dancing
Bronze medal – third place	1977 Helsinki	Ice dancing
Bronze medal – third place	1976 Geneva	Ice dancing
Bronze medal – third place	1975 Copenhagen	Ice dancing
Bronze medal – third place	1974 Zagreb	Ice dancing

Natalya Vladimirovna Linichuk (Russian: Наталья Владимировна Линичук; born 6 February 1956) is a Russian ice dancing coach and former competitive ice dancer for the Soviet Union. With partner and husband Gennadi Karponosov, she is the 1980 Olympic champion and a two-time World champion.

== Competitive career ==
Linichuk began skating due to her mother's love of figure skating. She had a dozen coaches before ending up in the group of Elena Tchaikovskaia, whom Linichuk soon sensed was the right coach for her.

Linichuk and Karponosov trained at Dynamo in Moscow. They won the World Universiade in 1972, and were bronze medalists at the 1974 and 1977 World Championships. They finished 4th at the 1976 Winter Olympics, the year ice dancing was introduced as an Olympic sport.

Linichuk and Karponosov became World champions in 1978 and 1979. They won the European Championships in 1979 and 1980, after winning a silver medal in 1978, and bronze medals from 1974 through 1977.

Linichuk and Karponosov won the 1980 Olympics, but failed to defend their World title, making them the only team ever to unsuccessfully defend a World title after winning the Olympics. In 1981, Linichuk and Karponosov retired from competition.

== Coaching career ==
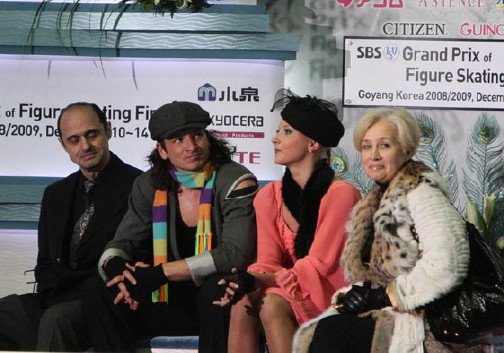
Linichuk (far right) in the Kiss and cry with Karponosov and students Domnina / Shabalin

After coaching in Moscow, Linichuk and Karponosov accepted an offer to coach in the U.S. They moved with their students in June 1994 and coached at the University of Delaware in Newark, Delaware. In September 2007, they moved to the Ice Works Skating Complex in Aston, Pennsylvania.

Their current and former senior-level students include:

- Tanith Belbin / Benjamin Agosto (coached from mid-2008 to 2010). 2009 World silver medalists for the U.S.
- Galit Chait / Sergei Sakhnovsky (World bronze medalists)
- Albena Denkova / Maxim Staviski (coached from mid-2005 to 2007). 2006, 2007 World Champions for Bulgaria.
- Oksana Domnina / Maxim Shabalin (coached from mid-2008 to 2010). 2010 Olympic bronze medalists for Russia.
- Oksana Grishuk / Evgeni Platov (Olympic and World champions). Coached Grishuk from the age of 11 until 1989 and then from 1992 to 1996.
- Natalia Gudina / Alexei Beletski
- Anjelika Krylova / Vladimir Fedorov (World bronze medalists)
- Anjelika Krylova / Oleg Ovsyannikov (World champions, Olympic silver medalists)
- Irina Lobacheva / Ilia Averbukh (World champions, Olympic silver medalists)

Their current and former junior-level students include:

- Lauri Bonacorsi / Travis Mager (from May 2010) 2011 U.S. Junior silver medalists
- Ekaterina Pushkash and Jonathan Guerreiro (coached from mid-2010 to 2014). 2011 World Junior silver medalists for Russia.

== Personal life ==
Linichuk accepted Karponosov's proposal after they retired from competition. She had one prior marriage. Linichuk and Karponosov were married on 31 July 1981. Their daughter, Anastasiya Karponosova, was born in February 1985. The couple initially lived in Moscow and then moved to the United States in the early '90s.

== Competitive highlights ==
International
Event	72–73	73–74	74–75	75–76	76–77	77–78	78–79	79–80	80–81
Olympics				4th				1st	
Worlds		3rd	4th	5th	3rd	1st	1st	2nd	
Europeans		3rd	3rd	3rd	3rd	2nd	1st	1st	3rd
Skate Canada				1st	1st				
Moscow News	3rd	1st		2nd	2nd	2nd		1st	1st
National
Soviet Champ.			2nd	1st	2nd		1st		1st
