= Sonja Morgenstern =

German figure skater and coach

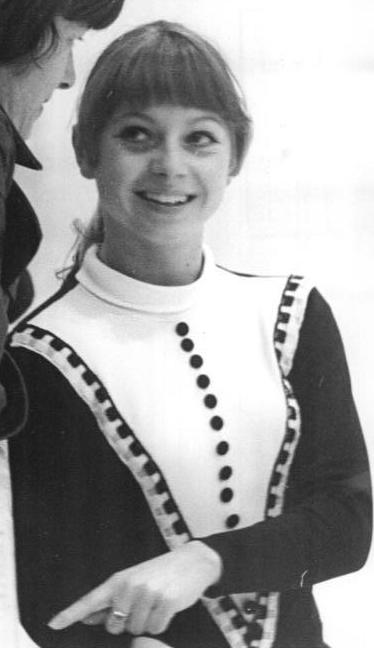
- Sonja Morgenstern in 1970

Personal information
- Born: 22 January 1955 (age 71) Frankenberg, Saxony, East Germany
- Height: 155 cm (5 ft 1 in)

Figure skating career
- Country: East Germany
- Retired: 1973
Medal record
Representing East Germany
Ladies' Figure skating
European Championships
Bronze medal – third place	1972 Gothenburg	Ladies' singles

Sonja Morgenstern (born 22 January 1955) is a German figure skating coach and former competitor.

Morgenstern was coached by Jutta Müller in Chemnitz and represented the SC Karl-Marx-Stadt club and East Germany (GDR). In 1966 she won the Spartakiade in figure skating. Two years later she participated in the Winter Olympics. Her biggest success was winning the bronze medal at the European Figure Skating Championships in 1972. In the same year, she placed sixth at the Winter Olympics. Her main East German rival was Christine Errath. In 1973 Morgenstern ended her figure skating career as a result of injuries. In the early 1980s she coached the 4-year-old Stefan Lindemann.

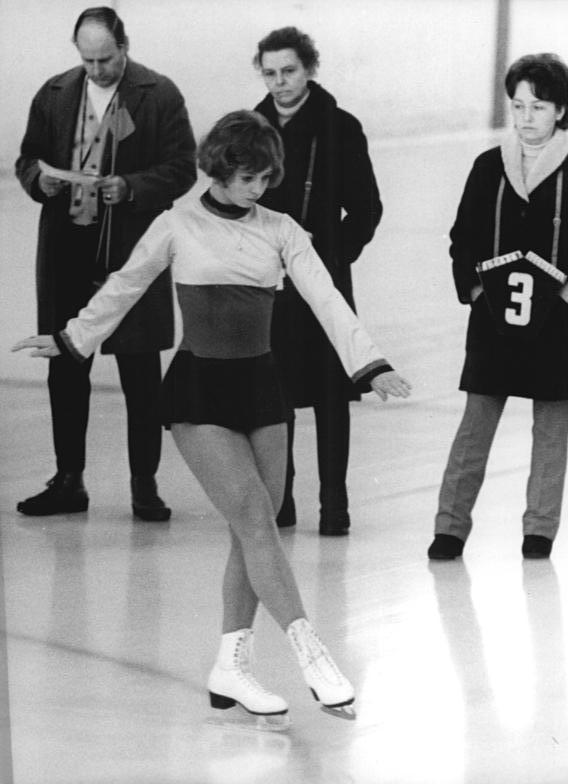
Morgenstern in 1971, executing figures

Having retired from figure skating, Morgenstern studied educational theory in Zwickau and became a teacher. She gave up teaching in 1981 due to the illness of her son Michael, who needed special care for the first four years of his life. She later became a beautician.

== Results ==
International
Event	67–68	68–69	69–70	70–71	71–72	72–73
Winter Olympics	28th				6th	
World Champ.	20th	WD	11th	6th	5th	8th
European Champ.	17th	12th	9th	4th	3rd	WD
Blue Swords		1st	1st	1st		
Moscow News		3rd				
National
East German Champ.		2nd	2nd	1st	1st	1st
WD = Withdrew
