= Gabriele Seyfert =

German figure skater

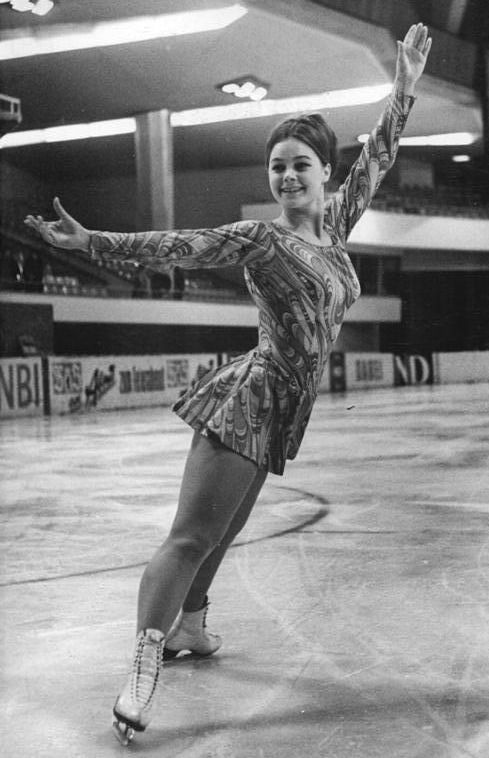
- Seyfert in 1968

Personal information
- Born: 23 November 1948 (age 77) Chemnitz, Soviet occupation zone of Germany
- Height: 1.60 m (5 ft 3 in)

Figure skating career
- Country: East Germany
- Skating club: SC Karl-Marx-Stadt
- Retired: 1972
Medal record
Ladies' figure skating
Representing East Germany
Olympic Games
Silver medal – second place	1968 Grenoble	Ladies' singles
World Championships
Gold medal – first place	1970 Ljubljana	Ladies' singles
Gold medal – first place	1969 Colorado Springs	Ladies' singles
Silver medal – second place	1968 Geneva	Ladies' singles
Silver medal – second place	1967 Vienna	Ladies' singles
Silver medal – second place	1966 Davos	Ladies' singles
European Championships
Gold medal – first place	1970 Leningrad	Ladies' singles
Gold medal – first place	1969 Garmisch-Partenkirchen	Ladies' singles
Silver medal – second place	1968 Västerås	Ladies' singles
Gold medal – first place	1967 Ljubljana	Ladies' singles
Silver medal – second place	1966 Bratislava	Ladies' singles

Gabriele "Gaby" Seyfert (later Rüger, then Messerschmidt, now Körner, born 23 November 1948) is a German former figure skater. She is a two-time World champion (1969, 1970), and the 1968 Olympic silver medalist.

She is the first lady to successfully land a triple loop jump in competition.

== Skating career ==
Seyfert skated for the club SC Karl-Marx-Stadt and represented East Germany. Her coach was her mother Jutta Müller, who also coached 1984 and 1988 Olympic champion Katarina Witt. She was a long-time rival of Peggy Fleming, but never defeated her.

In 1966, after two silver medals at the Europeans and the Worlds, she was voted as "the GDR female athlete of the year". She became the first woman to land a clean triple loop.

Seyfert ended her figure skating career in 1970. Unlike Peggy Fleming, she was not allowed to skate professionally. Offers by Holiday on Ice were refused by East German authorities. She was a Stasi informer under the codename "Perle".

Seyfert turned to coaching, and worked with Anett Pötzsch in the early 1970s. The East German coach hierarchy later transferred Pötzsch to Jutta Müller's group, and Seyfert ended her coaching career.

== Personal life ==
Seyfert was the only child of Wolfgang Seyfert and the former ice dancer and world famous coach, Jutta Müller.

She married ice dancer Eberhard Rüger in 1972 and they had a daughter in 1974. She then married Jochen Messerschmidt. In 2011, she married Egbert Körner.

After ending her coaching career, Seyfert studied languages at university and worked as a professional translator. From 1985 to 1991, she led the ice ballet at the Friedrichstadtpalast in East Berlin, where she also skated occasionally. After the ice ballet was closed, she worked at a service industry business in Berlin. She lives in Berlin-Karow.

== Results ==
International
Event	60–61	61–62	62–63	63–64	64–65	65–66	66–67	67–68	68–69	69–70
Winter Olympics				19th				2nd		
World Champ.		21st			5th	2nd	2nd	2nd	1st	1st
European Champ.	21st	12th	10th		5th	2nd	1st	2nd	1st	1st
Prague Skate					2nd					
Blue Swords		1st	2nd	1st	1st	1st	1st			
National
East German	1st	1st	1st	1st	1st	1st	1st	1st	1st	1st

Awards
Preceded by (East Germany) Hannelore Suppe	East German Sportswoman of the Year; 1966	Succeeded by (East Germany) Karin Janz
