= Nils Köpp =

German former figure skater

Personal information
- Other names: Nils Koepp

Figure skating career
- Country: East Germany
- Skating club: SC Karl-Marx-Stadt
- Retired: c. 1987
Medal record
Figure skating: Men's singles
Representing East Germany
World Junior Championships
Bronze medal – third place	1983 Sarajevo	Men's singles

Nils Köpp is a German former figure skater who represented East Germany. He is the 1983 World Junior bronze medalist. After moving up to the senior level, he won bronze at the 1985 Golden Spin of Zagreb, silver at the 1986 Karl Schäfer Memorial, and five medals at the East German Championships (four silver and one bronze).

Köpp competed at two European Championships, placing 12th in 1985 and 13th in 1986. He belonged to SC Karl-Marx-Stadt (Chemnitz).

== Competitive highlights ==
International
Event	81–82	82–83	83–84	84–85	85–86	86–87
European Champ.				12th	13th	
Blue Swords			4th			
Karl Schäfer Memorial						2nd
Golden Spin of Zagreb					3rd	
Prize of Moscow News						5th
International: Junior
World Junior Champ.		3rd				
Grand Prize SNP	3rd	1st				
National
East German Champ.		2nd	3rd	2nd	2nd	2nd
