= John Curry =

English figure skater (1949–1994)

John Curry OBE
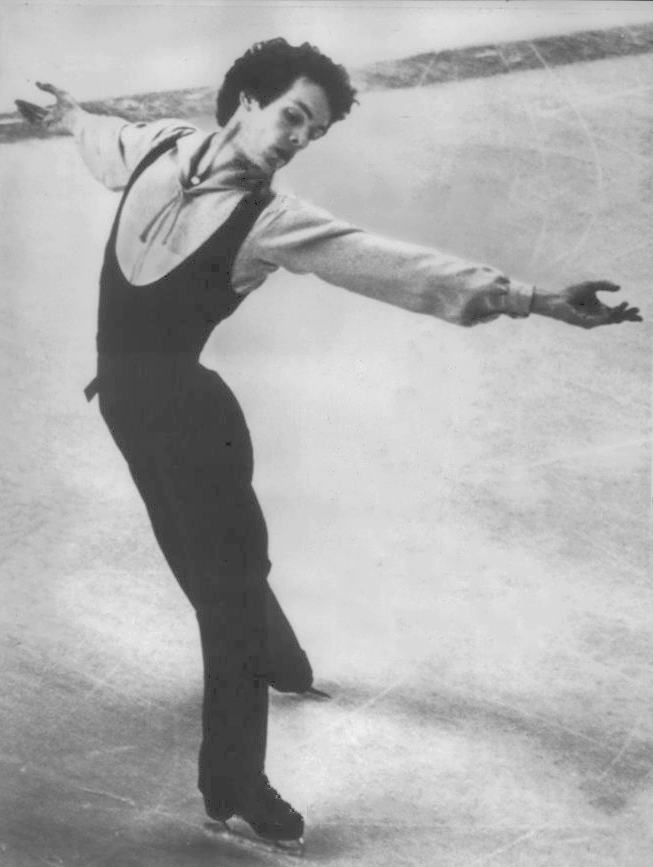
- Curry at the 1976 Olympics

Personal information
- Full name: John Anthony Curry
- Born: 9 September 1949 Birmingham, Warwickshire, England
- Died: 15 April 1994 (aged 44) Binton, Warwickshire, England
- Height: 180 cm (5 ft 11 in)

Figure skating career
- Country: Great Britain
- Skating club: Queens Ice Dance Club, London
- Retired: 1976
Medal record
Men's figure skating
Representing Great Britain
Olympic Games
Gold medal – first place	1976 Innsbruck	Singles
World Championships
Gold medal – first place	1976 Gothenburg	Singles
Bronze medal – third place	1975 Colorado Springs	Singles
European Championships
Gold medal – first place	1976 Geneva	Singles
Silver medal – second place	1975 Copenhagen	Singles
Bronze medal – third place	1974 Zagreb	Singles

John Anthony Curry, OBE (9 September 1949 – 15 April 1994) was a British figure skater. He was the 1976 European, World and Olympic Champion. He was noted for combining ballet and modern dance influences into his skating.

== Early life ==
Curry was born on 9 September 1949 in Birmingham, England. He had two older brothers. He was educated at Solihull School, a private school in the West Midlands and before this, at St Andrews, an independent boarding school in Somerset. As a child, Curry wanted to become a dancer, but his father disapproved of dance as an activity for boys. As a compromise, in 1957, he began to take figure skating lessons under the guidance of Ken Vickers at the Summerhill Road rink in Birmingham.

== Skating career ==
After his father took his own life when John was 16, he moved to London to study with Arnold Gerschwiler, who coached him to his first British title in 1971. In 1972, Curry found an American sponsor who enabled him to study in the United States with Gus Lussi, who worked with him on jumps, and Carlo Fassi, who worked with him on compulsory figures. According to figure skating historian James R. Hines, Curry "improved dramatically" under their coaching, helping him win a medal at every competition he entered in 1975 and win every competition he entered in 1976. At the age of 18, he added ballet lessons to his training.

=== Competitive career ===
Fassi coached Curry to European, World, and Olympic titles in 1976. He also won the British championships that year, giving him the coveted Grand Slam in figure skating with his four major titles in 1976. In the same year he was the flag bearer at the Winter Olympics for Great Britain and was voted BBC Sports Personality of the Year in 1976. He was the first male figure skater from Great Britain to win Olympic gold.

As an amateur competitor, Curry was noted for his ballet-like posture and extension, and his superb body control. Along with Canadian skater Toller Cranston, Curry was responsible for bringing the artistic and presentation aspects of men's figure skating to a new level. At the peak of his competitive career, Curry was also accomplished both at compulsory figures and the athletic (jumping) aspects of free skating.

During his 1976 Olympic free skate, using music from the ballet Don Quixote, he successfully landed a triple toe loop, a triple Salchow and a triple loop jump. His performance is known to have garnered the highest score ever given during the era of the 6.0 scoring in figure skating. He earned 105.9 points out of a possible 108 points from a panel of 9 international judges. Only the judges from Canada and the Soviet Union did not place him first. The judges' decisions are noteworthy because the silver medallist was Vladimir Kovalev of USSR and the bronze medallist was Toller Cranston of Canada. The programme, with its formal ballet positions and "measured restraint", was also known as one of Curry's most memorable performances. Two years earlier, he used Rite of Spring by Stravinsky, which was called "a new, more eccentric look to his skating".

His skating was unusual in that his jumps were performed counter-clockwise, but most of his spins (except flying spins) were performed clockwise. In his 1978 biography, Curry is clear that if he were to do it over, his choice would have been in favour of ballet due to its highly defined structure which was a basis for his ability to jump and spin in either direction thanks to his command of a true center line understanding.

Curry's skating was characterized by strict attention to detail and clean, classical lines. As figure skater and writer Ellyn Kestnbaum states, he used his training in ballet to portray integrity of movement rooted in both dance and skating techniques. Hines states that "coupled with 20 years of artistic development, his then fine-honed technique provided a balance that created one of the greatest artists in the history of the sport".

=== Professional career ===
Following the 1976 World Championships and retiring from "amateur" Olympic-level figure skating, he teamed up with fellow British figure skater Lorna Brown, herself a British figure skating champion, and began to develop a theatre-on-ice distinct from popular ice revues such as Holiday on Ice. Curry-Brown's concept was the antithesis to such shows. Curry turned professional and founded a touring skating company along the same lines as a traditional dance company. He also formed small skating companies that focused on "carefully choreographed and complex ensemble work skated to classical music and performed to exacting standards". Besides choreographing routines for the company, Curry commissioned works from dance choreographers such as Sir Kenneth MacMillan, Peter Martins and Twyla Tharp. Curry was inducted into the World Figure Skating Hall of Fame in 1991.

=== Theatre ===
Curry's Broadway theatre credits include Icedancing (1978) as a performer and director, the 1980 revival of Brigadoon as an actor (playing Harry Beaton) and the Roundabout Theatre 1989 revival of Privates on Parade as Lance Corporal Charles Bishop.

In 1979 Curry, alongside Anthony Dowell, gave the premiere of a dance piece Top Hat and Tails using the music by Irving Berlin and choreographed by Peter Gennaro, at the Million Dollar Celebration Gala at the Metropolitan Opera House New York.

== Personal life ==
It is speculated that Curry was outed as gay by a German tabloid newspaper, Bild-Zeitung before the March 1976 World Championships. He was competing in Gothenburg as Britain's (and the world's) first openly gay high-profile sportsperson. The revelation had occurred in February 1976, when John Vinocur, a reporter from the Associated Press, interviewed him in the days prior to his Olympic victory. His report, which included quotes from Curry that were candid about his sexuality, was published 24 hours after the victory made headline news. Curry confirmed he was gay at a press conference in Innsbruck the same evening. It caused a brief scandal in Europe at the time, but Curry's sexual orientation was generally ignored by the press and public for many years afterwards.

In 1987, Curry was diagnosed with HIV and, in 1991, with AIDS. In October 1992, he gave an interview to a newspaper in which he spoke about both his disease and his sexual orientation. He spent the last years of his life with his mother. He died of an AIDS-related heart attack on 15 April 1994 in Binton, Warwickshire, aged 44. In line with his own wishes, Curry had a humanist funeral. A humanist memorial service took place later that year at Conway Hall Ethical Society, London.

Donald Spoto's authorised biography of actor Alan Bates stated that Curry and Bates had a two-year affair, and that Bates helped nurse Curry in his final months.

In 2018, a documentary on Curry's life and career, The Ice King, was released by Dogwoof Pictures. The film was based on the biography Alone by Bill Jones, which was published in 2014.

== Programmes ==
Season	Short programme	Free skating	Exhibition
1975–1976	Rhapsody on a Theme of Paganini by Sergei Rachmaninoff	Don Quixote by Ludwig Minkus	Scheherazade by Nikolai Rimsky-Korsakov

== Results ==
Event	1969–70	1970–71	1971–72	1972–73	1973–74	1974–75	1975–76
Winter Olympics			10th				1st
World Championships		14th	9th	4th	7th	3rd	1st
European Championships	12th	7th	5th	4th	3rd	2nd	1st
Nebelhorn Trophy		2nd					
St. Gervais		1st					
British Championships	2nd	1st	2nd	1st	1st	1st	1st

Preceded by David Steele	BBC Sports Personality of the Year; 1976	Succeeded by Virginia Wade
