= Rolando Bragaglia =

Italian figure skater

Rolando Bragaglia is an Italian former competitive figure skater. In the 1970s, he won the national title and represented Italy at five ISU Championships. He finished in the top fifteen at the 1974 European Championships in Zagreb.

Bragaglia has worked as a technical specialist at skating competitions in Italy.

== Competitive highlights ==
International
Event	1972–73	1973–74	1974–75	1975–76
World Champ.	22nd	20th		
European Champ.	17th	15th		19th
Skate Canada		C		
National
Italian Champ.	2nd	1st		1st
