= Rico Krahnert =

German television production manager and former figure skater

Figure skating career
- Country: East Germany
- Skating club: SC Karl-Marx-Stadt
- Retired: c. 1989

Rico Krahnert is a German television production manager and former figure skater who competed for East Germany. He is the 1988 Golden Spin of Zagreb champion, the 1988 Karl Schafer Memorial silver medalist, and a two-time East German national medalist (silver in 1988, bronze in 1989).

Krahnert represented East Germany at the 1987 World Junior Championships in Kitchener, Ontario, Canada, and 1988 European Championships in Prague, Czechoslovakia. He belonged to SC Karl-Marx-Stadt (Chemnitz).

Krahnert has worked as a production manager for German television shows.

== Competitive highlights ==
International
Event	1985–86	1986–87	1987–88	1988–89
European Champ.			18th	
Golden Spin of Zagreb				1st
Schäfer Memorial				2nd
International: Junior
World Junior Champ.		14th		
Blue Swords	5th J	2nd J		
National
East German Champ.			2nd	3rd
