= Anna Pisánská =

Anna Pisanská
Personal information
- Born: 2 November 1959 (age 66) Uherské Hradiště

Figure skating career
- Country: Czechoslovakia
- Partner: Jiří Musil
- Coach: Kotek; Ivan Rezek

Anna Pisanská (born 2 November 1959 in Uherské Hradiště) is a former ice dancer who competed mainly for Czechoslovakia. With Jiří Musil, she is the 1979 Prague Skate bronze medalist and a four-time Czechoslovak national silver medalist. They finished in the top ten at 1979 European Championships in Zagreb, Yugoslavia, and 1980 European Championships in Gothenburg, Sweden. They placed 14th at the 1979 World Championships in Vienna, Austria.

Pisanská and Musil were coached by Kotek and Ivan Rezek in Brno. They emigrated to England in 1980. Representing the United Kingdom, they won gold at the 1982 World Professional Championships in Jaca, Spain.

== Results ==
=== Amateur career with Musil ===
International
Event	72–73	73–74	74–75	75–76	76–77	77–78	78–79	79–80
World Champ.							14th	
European Champ.					11th		10th	10th
Prague Skate								3rd
Grand Prize SNP		1st						
National
Czechoslovakia	3rd	3rd	2nd		2nd		2nd	2nd

=== Professional career with Musil ===
International
Event	1981	1982
World Professional Championships (Jaca)	4th	1st
