= Günter Zöller =

German figure skating coach and former competitor

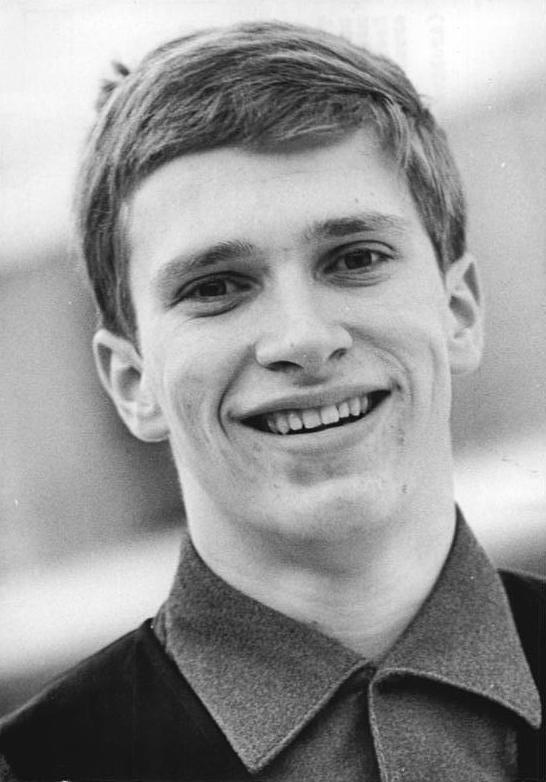
- Günter Zöller in 1967

Personal information
- Born: 21 May 1948 (age 78) Chemnitz, Saxony, Soviet occupation zone in Germany

Figure skating career
- Country: East Germany
- Retired: 1972
Medal record
Representing East Germany
Men's figure skating
World Championships
Bronze medal – third place	1970 Ljubljana	Men's singles
European Championships
Bronze medal – third place	1970 Leningrad	Men's singles

Günter Zöller (born 21 May 1948) is a German figure skating coach and former competitor for East Germany. He is the 1970 World bronze medalist, the 1970 European bronze medalist, a five-time Blue Swords champion, and a five-time East German national champion.

== Personal life ==
Günter Zöller was born 21 May 1948 in Chemnitz.

== Career ==
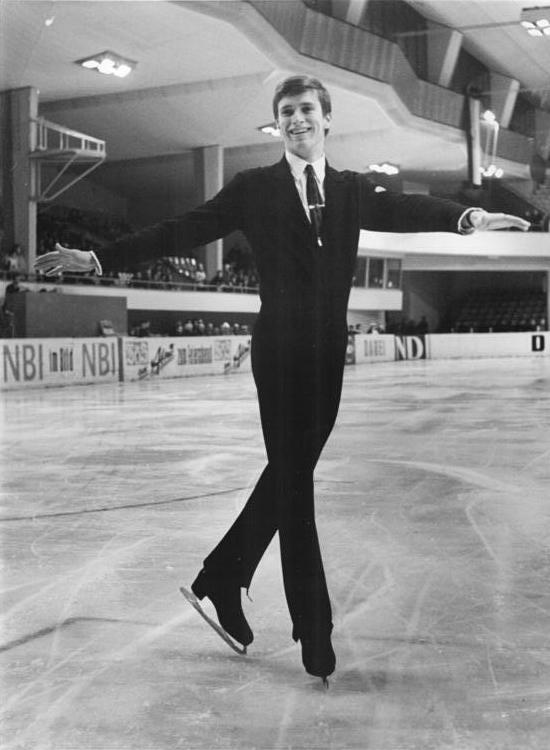
Günter Zöller in November 1971

Zöller began figure skating as a child. Coached by Jutta Müller, he represented the club SC Karl-Marx-Stadt and East Germany.

Zöller debuted at the European Championships in 1963 and finished 19th. In 1965, he won his first East German national title and was sent to the 1965 European Championships, where he placed 12th. He then competed at his first World Championships, placing 18th.

In 1967, after winning his second national title, Zöller advanced to seventh at Europeans and 11th at Worlds. He was sent to the 1968 Winter Olympics in Grenoble and finished 11th.

The 1969–70 season was Zöller's most successful. After winning his fifth national title, he was awarded bronze medals at the 1970 European Championships in Leningrad and the 1970 World Championships in Ljubljana. An injury kept him out of competition the following season.

Zöller traveled with the East German team to the 1972 European Championships in Gothenburg, Sweden but did not compete, choosing to defect before the start of the event. On 10 January 1972, he obtained an alien's passport at the West German embassy in Sweden and boarded a ferry to Kiel. He coached in Ludwigshafen before relocating to Mannheim in 1974. His former students include Claudia Leistner, Rudi Cerne, Stefan Pfrengle, Manuela Ruben, Petra Ernert, and Nathalie Weinzierl.

== Results ==
International
Event	62–63	63–64	64–65	65–66	66–67	67–68	68–69	69–70	71–72
Winter Olympics						11th			
World Champ.			18th		11th	11th	7th	3rd	
European Champ.	19th		12th		7th	8th	4th	3rd	WD
Golden Spin of Zagreb						1st			
Prague Skate			2nd		4th				
Moscow News					2nd				
Blue Swords				1st	1st	1st	1st	1st	
National
East German	2nd	2nd	1st	2nd	1st	1st	1st	1st	
WD: Withdrew
