= Anett Pötzsch =

German former figure skater (born 1960)

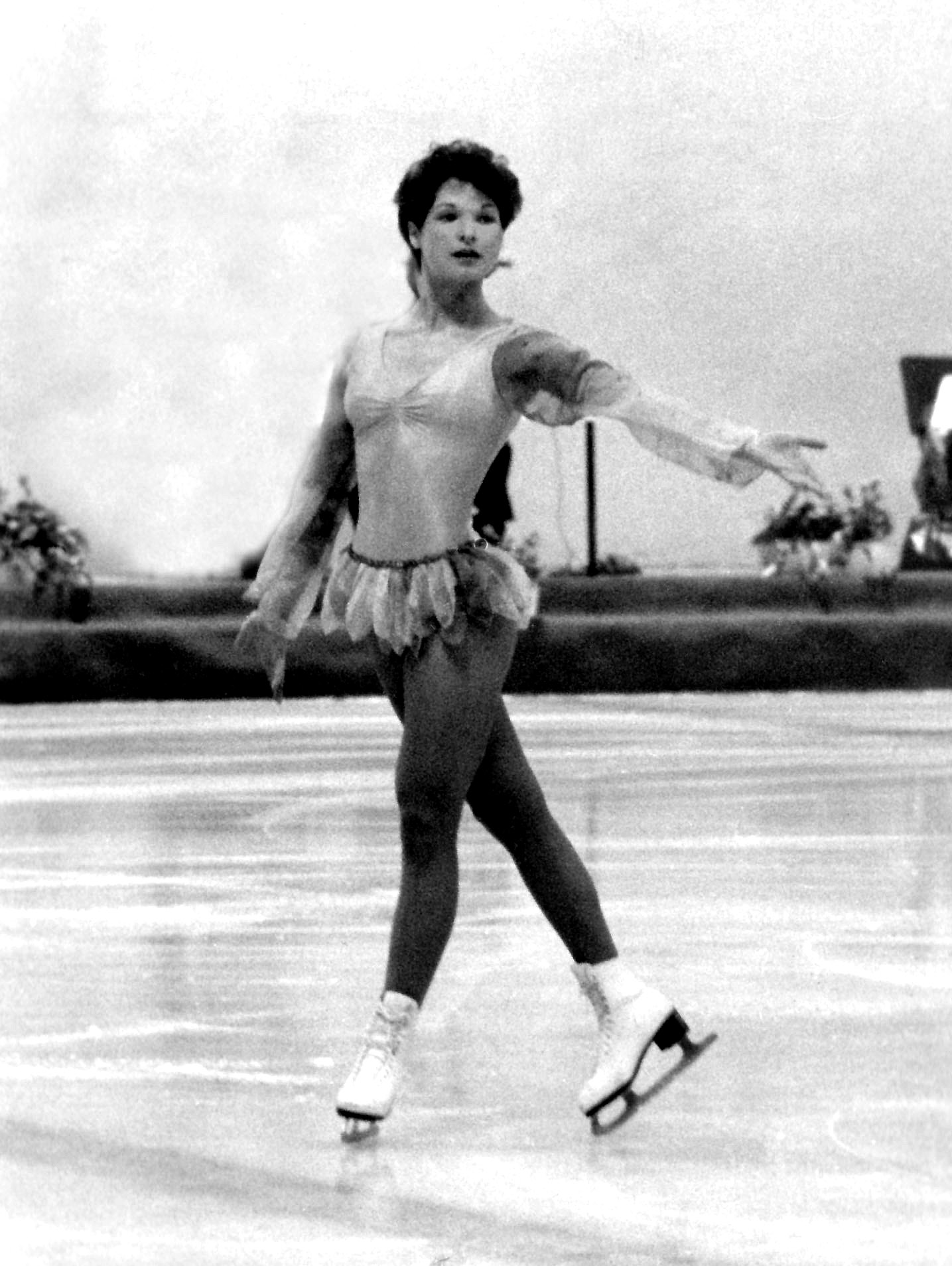
- Anett Pötzsch at the Blue Swords; Werner-Seelenbinder-Halle, Berlin; 18 November 1979

Personal information
- Born: 3 September 1960 (age 65) Karl-Marx-Stadt, East Germany
- Height: 1.60 m (5 ft 3 in)

Figure skating career
- Country: East Germany
- Retired: 1980
Medal record
Representing East Germany
Ladies' figure skating
Olympic Games
Gold medal – first place	1980 Lake Placid	Ladies' singles
World Championships
Gold medal – first place	1980 Dortmund	Ladies' singles
Gold medal – first place	1978 Ottawa	Ladies' singles
Silver medal – second place	1979 Vienna	Ladies' singles
Silver medal – second place	1977 Tokyo	Ladies' singles
European Championships
Gold medal – first place	1980 Gothenburg	Ladies' singles
Gold medal – first place	1979 Zagreb	Ladies' singles
Gold medal – first place	1978 Strasbourg	Ladies' singles
Gold medal – first place	1977 Helsinki	Ladies' singles
Silver medal – second place	1976 Geneva	Ladies' singles
Bronze medal – third place	1975 Copenhagen	Ladies' singles

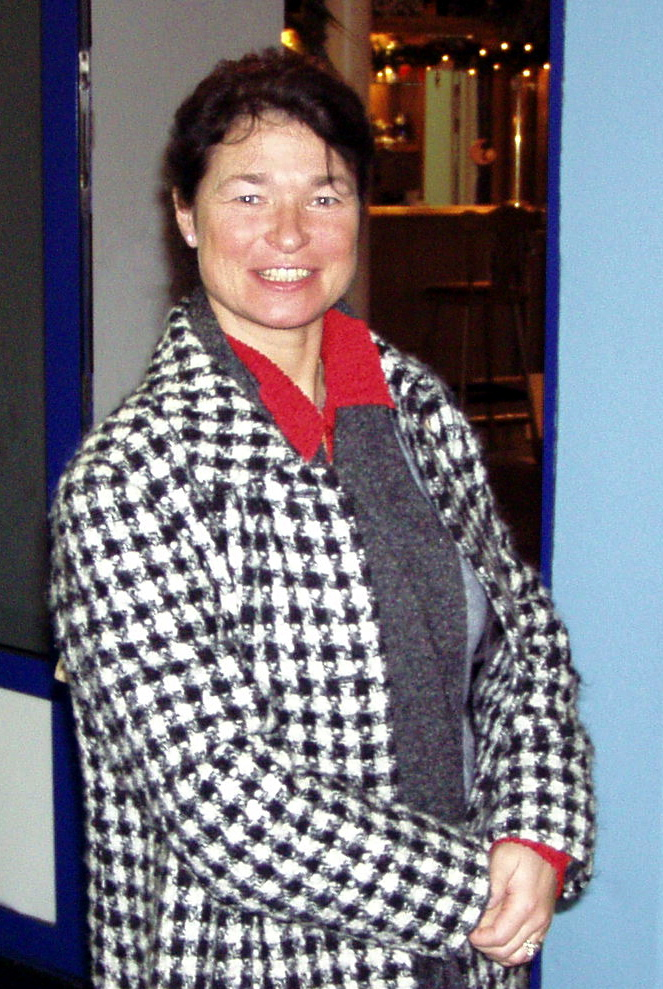
Anett Pötzsch at the German Nationals 2006

Anett Pötzsch (later Witt, now Rauschenbach; born 3 September 1960) is a German former figure skater. She is the 1980 Olympic champion, two-time World champion (1978, 1980), four-time European champion (1977–1980), and five-time East German champion (1976–1980).

== Career ==
Pötzsch represented the GDR (East Germany) in the ladies events at international championships. Her first coach was Brigitte Schellhorn. After Pötzsch was admitted into a sports academy, Gabriele Seyfert was assigned as her coach and later, Seyfert's mother, Jutta Müller, took over coaching duties. She was the Olympic Champion in 1980 and world champion in 1978 and 1980. She also won the European title four times, from 1977 to 1980; and the East German title five times, from 1976 to 1980. In 1981, she announced her retirement, saying in 2011, "I had knee problems and I was not motivated because I had reached all my goals" but she said she later regretted her decision.

Pötzsch was a judge at international skating events in the late 1980s but the ISU banned her after she appeared in Skates of Gold shows and Katarina Witt's film, Carmen. The ISU restored her eligibility in 1994, along with that of professional skaters. In the 1990s, Pötzsch worked at a bank but quit her job in 1999 in order to coach. She coaches in Chemnitz, Germany, and in 2004 became an ISU technical specialist. Her students include Daniel Dotzauer, the 2010 German Championships bronze medalist, and Sandy Hoffmann.

== Personal life ==
Pötzsch was born in Karl-Marx-Stadt, GDR (today renamed Chemnitz, Germany). She married Axel Witt, the brother of fellow German figure skater Katarina Witt, but the couple divorced in 1990. Their daughter, Claudia Rauschenbach, born in 1984, is the 2000 German pair skating champion with Robin Szolkowy. In 1993, Pötzsch married Axel Rauschenbach, who is the father of her second daughter, Cindy, and stepfather to Claudia.

== Results ==
International
Event	71–72	72–73	73–74	74–75	75–76	76–77	77–78	78–79	79–80	80–81
Olympics					4th				1st	
Worlds		14th	11th	8th	4th	2nd	1st	2nd	1st	
Europeans		8th	7th	3rd	2nd	1st	1st	1st	1st	
Blue Swords	4th	5th	2nd	2nd	2nd	1st			1st	1st
Prague Skate	2nd									
Golden Spin			1st							
Skate Canada				2nd						
National
East Germany	4th	3rd	2nd	2nd	1st	1st	1st	1st	1st	
