= Marie-Claude Bierre =

French figure skater

Marie-Claude Bierre is a former French figure skater who competed in ladies' singles. She is the 1972–77 French champion.

== Results ==
International
Event	70–71	71–72	72–73	73–74	74–75	75–76	76–77
World Champ.		16th	18th		19th		18th
European Champ.	20th	20th	12th	14th	17th	16th	
Prague Skate						5th	
National
French Champ.	2nd	1st	1st	1st	1st	1st	1st
