= Walter Cecconi =

Italian ice dancer (born 1957)

Personal information
- Nationality: Italian
- Born: 27 October 1957 (age 67); Milan, Italy

Sport
- Sport: Figure skating

Walter Cecconi (born 27 October 1957) is an Italian ice dancer. He competed in the ice dance event at the 1976 Winter Olympics.
