= Stefania Bertelè =

Italian ice dancer (born 1957)

Personal information
- Nationality: Italian
- Born: 22 June 1957 (age 67); Milan, Italy

Sport
- Sport: Figure skating

Stefania Bertelè (born 22 June 1957) is an Italian ice dancer. She competed in the ice dance event at the 1976 Winter Olympics.
