= Robin Cousins =

British former competitive figure skater

Robin Cousins MBE
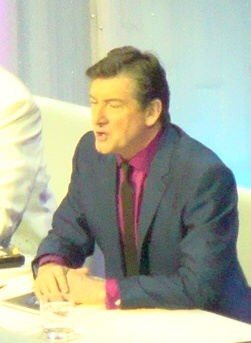

Personal information
- Born: 17 August 1957 (age 69) Bristol, England
- Height: 1.83 m (6 ft 0 in)

Figure skating career
- Skating club: Queen's Ice Club London; Bristol Ice Dance and Figure Skating Club
- Retired: 1980 (amateur), 1997 (professional)
Medal record
Representing Great Britain
Olympic Games
Gold medal – first place	1980 Lake Placid	Singles
World Championships
Silver medal – second place	1980 Dortmund	Singles
Silver medal – second place	1979 Vienna	Singles
Bronze medal – third place	1978 Ottawa	Singles
European Championships
Gold medal – first place	1980 Gothenburg	Singles
Bronze medal – third place	1979 Zagreb	Singles
Bronze medal – third place	1978 Strasbourg	Singles
Bronze medal – third place	1977 Helsinki	Singles

Robin John Cousins (born 17 August 1957) is a British former competitive figure skater who was BBC Sports Personality of the Year in 1980. He was the 1980 Olympic champion, the 1980 European champion, a three-time World medalist (1978–1980) and four-time British national champion (1977–1980), winning all of these titles during his amateur career. He followed this with a successful career as a professional figure skater and later starred in ice shows as well as producing several of his own. He is able to spin in either direction, both clockwise and anti-clockwise, which is an unusual skill for a figure skater.

Off the ice, Cousins commentates on figure skating events for the BBC and was head judge on ITV's Dancing on Ice show from 2006 to 2014. He has also appeared in theatre productions, including the West End.

== Early life ==
Robin Cousins was born in Bristol to Jo, a secretary, and Fred, a civil servant, who was formerly a goalkeeper for Millwall F.C. Cousins has two older brothers, Martin and Nick. He attended Henbury School but left at the age of 15.

Cousins first stepped onto the ice at age six at Westover Road Ice Rink while on holiday in Bournemouth. Having enjoyed the experience, he requested lessons for Christmas eighteen months later.

As a young skater, Cousins trained in ice dancing at the same time as singles. His first coach was Pamela Davies. He was later coached by Gladys Hogg at Queens Ice Rink and then by Carlo Fassi.

Cousins left school at the age of fifteen to focus on figure skating. In 1974, he moved alone from Bristol to London, where he would live in a small bedsit that "amounted to a converted closet." He found a job stacking shelves at Whiteley's department store.

== Competitive career ==
Cousins won his first national title in 1969, aged 12, at novice level. By the age of 14, he was Britain's junior champion, and he made his international debut that same year.

Cousins represented the United Kingdom as an amateur figure skater for eight years. He won the British National Senior Championships for four consecutive years (1977–1980); the free skating portion of the World Championships three times (1978–1980); and the silver medal at the World Championships in 1979 and 1980.

He reached the pinnacle of his amateur career by winning gold medals both in the European Championships and in the Winter Olympic Games in Lake Placid, New York, in 1980. At the Olympics, he was in second place behind Jan Hoffman after the compulsory figures and the short programme. Cousins skated a spectacular long programme, receiving 5.9/6.0 from eight of the nine judges for artistic impression. Hoffmann skated a technically superior performance, but six out of nine judges gave first place to Cousins, giving him the overall win and the gold medal. He was voted BBC Sports Personality of the Year for 1980. Cousins never won a world title; figure skating historian James R. Hines states that it was due to his weakness in compulsory figures, although "his strength was always in free skating".

He turned professional in 1980 and went on to win the World Professional Men's Figure Skating Championships twice (1985 and 1987) and was a World Professional singles medalist four times (1986, 1990, 1991, 1992).

== Later career ==
After turning professional in 1980, Cousins starred in various professional skating shows such as Holiday on Ice and Ice Capades, whilst continuing to be a regular competitor in the World Professional Championships. Hines stated that Cousins' "flair and talent served him well" as a professional.

He was appointed a Member of the Order of the British Empire (MBE) for services to ice skating in the 1980 Birthday Honours. He hit both the longest Axel jump and the longest back flip on figure skates in the Guinness Book of World Records, reaching 5.81 metres (19 ft 1 in) and 5.48 metres (18 ft) on 16 November 1983.

In 1983, Cousins formed his own ice skating performance company, which toured the world with professional ice shows Electric Ice and Ice Majesty. He has starred in, produced, directed, and/or choreographed many international TV ice shows, including The Nutcracker: A Fantasy on Ice, Sleeping Beauty on Ice, The Wizard of Oz on Ice, Toy Story on Ice, Andrew Lloyd Webber's Starlight Express on Ice, numerous productions for Holiday on Ice, and the film The Cutting Edge.

Over several years, Cousins has been a regular guest presenter and commentator for BBC Sport, for the European and World Figure Skating Championships and the Winter Olympics. He appeared as the head judge on the show Dancing on Ice in each series from 2006 to 2014, but did not return to the show when it was revived in 2018.

Cousins has also performed on stage. He played the Prince in Rodgers and Hammerstein's Cinderella, Munkustrap in Cats, Frank N Furter in The Rocky Horror Show, Teen Angel in Grease, and Billy Flynn in Chicago in the West End. He has performed pantomime, playing Jack Frost in Santa Clause the return of Jack Frost at the Mayflower Theatre, Southampton. Prior to this he played the Prince in Snow White and the Seven Dwarfs at the Grand Opera House, Belfast.

Cousins has worked with the British synchronized swimming team.

In 2005, he was inducted into the World Figure Skating Hall of Fame.

In March 2016, Cousins joined the Art of the Olympians (AOTO) program. In May 2021, Cousins was elected as Vice Chair of the British Ice Skating board for a 4-year term and appointed as its President.

== Personal life ==
Cousins has undergone a total of eight operations, including a knee replacement in his fifties. His problems began at the 1974 World Championships, where he withdrew before the event started and returned to Bristol to have his first of two meniscus operations. The second came immediately after the 1977 World Championships when his left knee cartilage ripped and locked in place. By 1980, he had undergone major surgery on both his left and right knees.

In March 1980, Cousins was the subject of This Is Your Life, after being surprised by Eamonn Andrews in his home city of Bristol.

In 2007, Cousins married his male partner.

On 10 March 2012, he appeared on the gameshow All Star Family Fortunes with four of his nephews. He also appeared on the gameshow Tipping Point Lucky Stars in August 2013.

== Charity work ==
Cousins is a significant patron of the Meningitis UK organization and the Starr Trust children's charity in Brighton.

== Programmes ==
Season	Short program	Free skating	Exhibition
1979–1980	The Railway Children by Johnny Douglas	Belle de Jour; Dragons At Midnight; Murder on the Orient Express; Paint It Black	With You I'm Born Again; Don't Stop 'Til You Get Enough; Where Do I Go? from Hair
1978–1979	Swan Lake etc. by Pyotr Ilyich Tchaikovsky, Dmitri Shostakovich	Classical exhibition	
1977–1978	The Railway Children	Lady Sings The Blues; Yellow Submarine (movie instrumental); Silent Movie by Michel Legrand, John Morris	Disco exhibition number; The Flower Song from Carmen by Georges Bizet
1976–1977	The Railway Children	Eldorado; Kalinka; Clair De Lune; Hava Nagila by Electric Light Orchestra, Claude Debussy	
1975–1976		Variation on Three Blind Mice by John Dankworth	
1974–1975			Enter the Greeks
1973–1974			Malagueña by Ernesto Lecuona

== Results ==
=== Amateur career ===
International
Event	1972–73	1973–74	1974–75	1975–76	1976–77	1977–78	1978–79	1979–80
Olympics				10th				1st
Worlds			12th	9th	WD	3rd	2nd	2nd
Europeans	15th	11th	11th	6th	3rd	3rd	3rd	1st
Skate Canada					2nd	1st		
NHK Trophy								1st
St. Gervais					1st			
National
British Champ.	3rd	2nd	2nd	2nd	1st	1st	1st	1st
WD = Withdrew

=== Professional career ===
Event/Season	1980	1981	1985	1986	1987	1988	1989	1990	1991	1992	1993	1994	1995	1997
World Professional Champ.	1st*	2nd*	1st	2nd	1st	4th		2nd	3rd	2nd				
Challenge of Champions			1st	2nd				3rd	4th		2nd		3rd	
World Cup of Skating							1st							
World Team Champ.												3rd*		
North American Open												3rd		
Canadian Pro Champ.												4th		
Legends Champ.														2nd
Asterisk indicates results from team competitions
