= Gloria Mas =

Spanish figure skater

Personal information
- Nationality: Spanish
- Born: 6 December 1960 (age 64); Barcelona, Spain

Sport
- Sport: Figure skating

Gloria Mas (born 6 December 1960) is a Spanish former competitive figure skater. She competed in the ladies' singles event at the 1980 Winter Olympics.
