= Kay Barsdell =

British ice dancer

Personal information
- Nationality: British
- Born: 10 November 1952 (age 72); London, England

Sport
- Sport: Figure skating

Kay Barsdell (born 10 November 1952) is a British ice dancer. Partnering Ken Foster, she competed in the ice dance event at the 1976 Winter Olympics. In later years, Barsdell and Foster skated in exhibitions and, following her retirement, she became a coach.
