= Matjaž Krušec =

Slovenian figure skating official

Figure skating career
- Country: Yugoslavia
- Retired: c. 1979

Matjaž Krušec is a Slovenian figure skating official and former competitor for Yugoslavia. He competed at the 1979 World Championships and four European Championships. He has served as an International Skating Union referee and international technical controller. He is the former president of the Stanko Bloudek Figure and Roller Skating Club in Ljubljana.

== Competitive highlights ==
Event	1972–73	1973–74	1974–75	1975–76	1976–77	1977–78	1978–79
World Championships							22nd
European Championships				22nd	15th	15th	19th
Yugoslav Championships	2nd	2nd		1st	1st		1st
Prague Skate					13th		
