= Kenneth Foster (figure skater) =

British ice dancer

Personal information
- Nationality: British
- Born: 16 June 1951 (age 73)

Sport
- Sport: Figure skating

Kenneth Foster (born 16 June 1951) is a British ice dancer. He competed in the ice dance event at the 1976 Winter Olympics.
