= Anne-Sophie de Kristoffy =

French figure skater

Personal information
- Born: 29 May 1961 (age 65) Paris, France

Figure skating career
- Country: France
- Coach: Philippe Pélissier
- Retired: 1982

Anne-Sophie de Kristoffy (born 29 May 1961) is a French former competitive figure skater. She is a three-time (1978–80) French national champion in ladies' singles.

In May 1984, de Kristoffy became a sports reporter for TF1. In 2006, she was a member of the jury on TF1's Grand Défi de la glace. In January 2008, she was named director of TF1's sports service.

== Results ==
International
Event	75–76	76–77	77–78	78–79	79–80	80–81	81–82
World Champ.					18th	14th	
European Champ.		22nd		22nd	17th		
NHK Trophy							8th
Skate Canada							10th
St. Gervais						3rd	
National
French Champ.	2nd	2nd	1st	1st	1st	3rd	2nd
