= Marion Weber =

East German figure skater

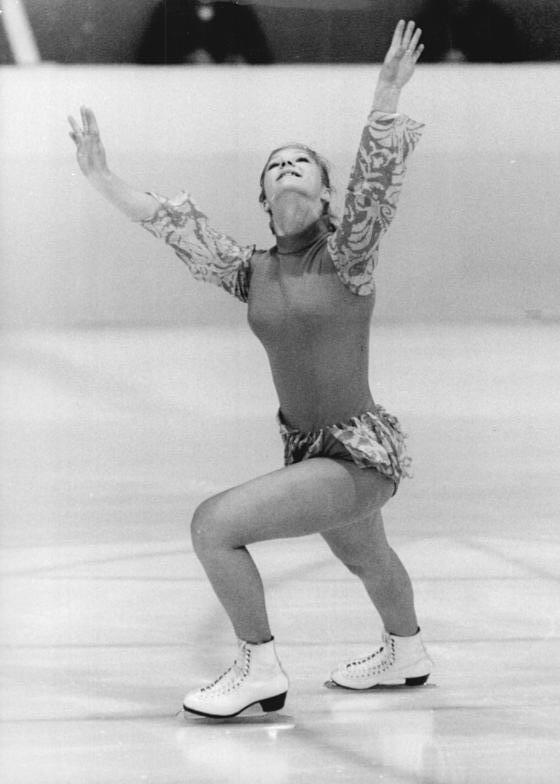
- Weber in November 1974 at the Richmond Trophy

Personal information
- Born: 19 May 1959 (age 67) Karl-Marx-Stadt, East Germany
- Height: 1.66 m (5 ft 5 1/2 in)

Figure skating career
- Country: East Germany
- Retired: 1978

Marion Weber (born 19 May 1959) is a former figure skater who competed for East Germany. She is the 1974 Richmond Trophy champion and 1977 Prague Skate silver medalist. Weber was selected to represent East Germany at the 1976 Winter Olympics and finished 11th. Her best ISU Championship result was fourth at the 1977 European Championships.

== Results ==
International
Event	71–72	72–73	73–74	74–75	75–76	76–77	77–78
Winter Olympics					11th		
World Champ.			11th	11th		10th	
European Champ.			9th	7th	WD	4th	
Blue Swords	6th	3rd	3rd	3rd		2nd	2nd
Moscow News			3rd				
Prague Skate							2nd
Richmond Trophy				1st			
National
East Germany			3rd		2nd	2nd	3rd
WD = Withdrew
