= Isabella Rizzi =

Italian ice dancer (born 1958)

Personal information
- Nationality: Italian
- Born: 9 May 1958 (age 66); Milan, Italy

Sport
- Sport: Figure skating

Isabella Rizzi (born 9 May 1958) is an Italian ice dancer. She competed in the ice dance event at the 1976 Winter Olympics.
