= 1974 World Figure Skating Championships =

Annual figure skating competition held in 1974

- Type: ISU Championship
- Date: March 5 – 10
- Season: 1973–74
- Location: Munich, West Germany
- Host: Deutsche Eislauf Union
- Venue: Olympiahalle

Champions
- Men's singles: (East Germany) Jan Hoffmann
- Ladies' singles: (East Germany) Christine Errath
- Pairs: (Soviet Union) Irina Rodnina / Alexandr Zaitsev
- Ice dance: (Soviet Union) Lyudmila Pakhomova / Alexandr Gorshkov
- Previous: 1973 World Championships
- Next: 1975 World Championships

The 1974 World Figure Skating Championships were held at the Olympiahalle in Munich, West Germany from March 5 to 10. At the event, sanctioned by the International Skating Union, medals were awarded in men's singles, ladies' singles, pair skating, and ice dance.

== Medal table ==
Rank	Nation	Gold	Silver	Bronze	Total
1	Soviet Union (URS)	2	2	1	5
2	East Germany (GDR)	2	0	1	3
3	Great Britain (GBR)	0	1	0	1
3	United States (USA)	0	1	0	1
5	Canada (CAN)	0	0	1	1
5	Netherlands (NED)	0	0	1	1
Totals (6 entries)		4	4	4	12

== Results ==
=== Men ===
Rank	Name	Nation	CP	SP	FP	Points	Places
1	Jan Hoffmann	East Germany	1	5	2	231.44	11
2	Sergei Volkov	Soviet Union	2	3	7	227.94	27
3	Toller Cranston	Canada	8	1	1	227.86	26
4	Vladimir Kovalev	Soviet Union	3	4	4	226.21	38
5	Ron Shaver	Canada	7	2	3	225.13	39
6	Gordon McKellen Jr.	United States	5	7	5	222.80	60
7	John Curry	United Kingdom	4	6	9	220.68	60
8	Minoru Sano	Japan	11	8	6	215.63	79
9	Zdeněk Pazdírek	Czechoslovakia	9	10	10	213.44	85
10	Didier Gailhaguet	France	6	11	12	221.75	86
11	László Vajda	Hungary	10	9	11	209.78	99
12	Terry Kubicka	United States	15	15	8		109
13	Bernd Wunderlich	East Germany	13	12	14		116
14	Erich Reifschneider	West Germany	14	13	13		118
15	Robert Rubens	Canada	20	14	15		138
16	Ronald Koppelent	Austria	18	17	16		145
17	Miroslav Šoška	Czechoslovakia	12	16	21		158
18	Pekka Leskinen	Finland	16	18	19		159
19	Jacek Tascher	Poland	21	20	17		172
20	Rolando Bragaglia	Italy	19	19	20		175
21	Glyn Jones	United Kingdom	25	21	18		195
22	Gilles Beyer	France	22	22	23		197
23	Thomas Öberg	Sweden	23	23	22		208
24	Gheorghe Fazekas	Romania	17	25	25		211
25	William Schober	Australia	24	24	24		222
26	Silvio Švajger	Yugoslavia	26	26	26		234

Referee:

- Elemér Terták Czechoslovakia

Assistant Referee:

- Benjamin Wright United Kingdom

Judges:

- Milan Duchón Czechoslovakia
- Geoffrey Yates United Kingdom
- Dorothy Leamen Canada
- Kinuko Ueno Japan
- Walburga Grimm East Germany
- Tatiana Danilenko Soviet Union
- Norman E. Fuller United States
- Néri Valdes France
- Hans Fuchs West Germany

Substitute judge:

- Leena Vainio Finland

=== Ladies ===
Rank	Name	Nation	CP	SP	FP	Points	Places
1	Christine Errath	East Germany	2	1	2	230.95	12
2	Dorothy Hamill	United States	5	2	1	228.71	15
3	Dianne de Leeuw	Netherlands	4	5	4	221.16	27
4	Gerti Schanderl	West Germany	11	4	3	216.07	54
5	Karin Iten	Switzerland	1	14	17	215.87	61
6	Lynn Nightingale	Canada	12	3	5	215.61	66
7	Kath Malmberg	United States	7	8	10	216.19	66
8	Juli McKinstry	United States	6	9	7	216.34	67
9	Liana Drahová	Czechoslovakia	9	6	6	214.67	72
10	Marion Weber	East Germany	8	10	8	214.50	75
11	Anett Pötzsch	East Germany	10	7	9	212.38	98
12	Maria McLean	United Kingdom	3	12	13		98
13	Barbara Terpenning	Canada	14	11	11		111
14	Gail Keddie	United Kingdom	17	16	14		140
15	Emi Watanabe	Japan	19	17	12		139
16	Sonja Balun	Austria	16	13	15		142
17	Cinzia Frosio	Italy	13	15	16		142
18	Liudmila Bakonina	Soviet Union	18	18	19	194.32	163
19	Hana Knapová	Czechoslovakia	20	19	18		164
20	Chang Myung-su	South Korea	15	20	20		180
21	Evelyne Reusser	Switzerland	21	21	23		193
22	Grażyna Dudek	Poland	4	23	21		195
23	Eva Hansson	Sweden	25	22	24		205
24	Marie-Hélène Panet	France	23	25	25		216
25	Helena Gazvoda	Yugoslavia	28	24	22		230
26	Sharon Burley	Australia	22	27	27		231
27	Susan Broman	Finland	26	26	26		240
28	Liv Egelund	Norway	27	28	28		252

Referee:

- Sonia Bianchetti Italy

Assistant Referee:

- János Zsigmondy West Germany

Judges:

- Michele Beltrami Italy
- Pamela Peat United Kingdom
- Helga von Wiecki East Germany
- Kikuko Minami Japan
- René Schlageter Switzerland
- David Dore Canada
- Yvonne S. McGowan United States
- Eva von Gamm West Germany
- Ingeborg Nilsson Norway

Substitute judge:

- Ludwig Gassner Austria

=== Pairs ===
Rank	Name	Nation	SP	FP	Points	Places
1	Irina Rodnina / Alexander Zaitsev	Soviet Union	1	1	141.09	9
2	Liudmila Smirnova / Alexei Ulanov	Soviet Union	2	2	139.05	21
3	Romy Kermer / Rolf Österreich	East Germany	3	3	138.53	25
4	Manuela Groß / Uwe Kagelmann	East Germany	4	4	136.73	36
5	Sandra Bezic / Val Bezic	Canada	5	5	134.96	44
6	Irina Vorobieva / Alexander Vlasov	Soviet Union	6	6	132.79	54
7	Karin Künzle / Christian Künzle	Switzerland	7	7	131.28	71
8	Melissa Militano / Johnny Johns	United States	8	8	131.24	72
9	Corinna Halke / Eberhard Rausch	West Germany	9	9	130.70	80
10	Tai Babilonia / Randy Gardner	United States	10	10	129.11	88
11	Katja Schubert / Knut Schubert	East Germany	11	11	125.39	96
12	Grażyna Kostrzewińska / Adam Brodecki	Poland	12	12		108
13	Florence Cahn / Jean-Roland Racle	France	14	13		121
14	Ursula Nemec / Michael Nemec	Austria	13	14		126
15	Linda McCafferty / Colin Tayforth	United Kingdom	16	15		133
16	Ilona Urbanová / Ales Zach	Czechoslovakia	15	16		139
17	Petra Schneider / Bogdan Pulcer	West Germany	17	17		163
18	Kathy Hutchinson / Jamie McGrigor	Canada	18	18		162

Referee:

- Donald H. Gilchrist Canada

Assistant Referee:

- Erika Schiechtl West Germany

Judges:

- Liliane Caffin-Madaule France
- Miroslav Hasenöhrl Czechoslovakia
- Walburga Grimm East Germany
- Pamela Davis United Kingdom
- Eva von Gamm West Germany
- Dorothy Leamen Canada
- Maria Zuchowicz Poland
- Valentin Piseev Soviet Union
- Ardelle K. Sanderson United States

Substitute judge:

- Jürg Wilhelm Switzerland

=== Ice dance ===
Rank	Name	Nation	CD	FD	Points	Places
1	Liudmila Pakhomova / Alexander Gorshkov	Soviet Union	1	1	211.78	9
2	Hilary Green / Glyn Watts	United Kingdom	2	2	206.26	18
3	Natalia Linichuk / Gennadi Karponosov	Soviet Union	3	3	201.00	28
4	Irina Moiseeva / Andrei Minenkov	Soviet Union	5	4	198.50	43
5	Janet Sawbridge / Peter Dalby	United Kingdom	4	5	197.74	44
6	Krisztina Regőczy / András Sallay	Hungary	6	6	195.32	53
7	Colleen O'Connor / Jim Millns	United States	7	7	194.30	58
8	Matilde Ciccia / Lamberto Ceserani	Italy	8	9	188.94	77
9	Louise Soper / Barry Soper	Canada	9	8	188.40	79
10	Teresa Weyna / Piotr Bojańczyk	Poland	10	10	185.44	89
11	Janet Thompson / Warren Maxwell	United Kingdom	11	11		96
12	Diana Skotnická / Martin Skotnický	Czechoslovakia	13	12		114
13	Anne Millier / Harvey Millier III	United States	12	15		122
14	Gerda Bühler / Mathis Bächi	Switzerland	14	13		125
15	Barbara Berezowski / David Porter	Canada	15	14		131
16	Sylvia Fuchs / Michael Fuchs	West Germany	16	16		143
17	Eva Peštová / Jiři Pokorný	Czechoslovakia	17	17		149
18	Nicole Rinsant / Dirk Beyer	West Germany	18	18		161
19	Brigitte Scheijbal / Walter Leschetizky	Austria	19	19		171

Referee:

- Lawrence Demmy United Kingdom

Assistant Referee:

- Hans Kutschera Austria

Judges:

- Jürg Wilhelm Switzerland
- Maria Zuchowicz Poland
- Mary Louise Wright United States
- Klára Kozári Hungary
- Willi Wernz West Germany
- Dagmar Řeháková Czechoslovakia
- Irina Absaliamova Soviet Union
- Audrey Moore Canada
- Pauline Borrajo United Kingdom

Substitute judge:

- Lino Clerici France
