= 1975 World Figure Skating Championships =

Annual figure skating competition held in 1975

- Type: ISU Championship
- Date: March 4 – 8
- Season: 1974–75
- Location: Colorado Springs, USA
- Venue: Broadmoor World Arena

Champions
- Men's singles: (Soviet Union) Sergei Volkov
- Ladies' singles: (Netherlands) Dianne de Leeuw
- Pairs: (Soviet Union) Irina Rodnina / Alexander Zaitsev
- Ice dance: (Soviet Union) Irina Moiseeva / Andrei Minenkov
- Previous: 1974 World Championships
- Next: 1976 World Championships

The 1975 World Figure Skating Championships were held in Colorado Springs, Colorado, USA from March 4 to 8. At the event, sanctioned by the International Skating Union, medals were awarded in men's singles, ladies' singles, pair skating, and ice dancing.

Men's compulsory figures were performed on March 4 at 8 am and ladies' figures took place the next day. The number of figures executed by each skater had been reduced from six to three.

== Medal table ==
Rank	Nation	Gold	Silver	Bronze	Total
1	Soviet Union (URS)	3	1	0	4
2	Netherlands (NED)	1	0	0	1
3	United States (USA)	0	2	0	2
4	East Germany (GDR)	0	1	2	3
5	Great Britain (GBR)	0	0	2	2
Totals (5 entries)		4	4	4	12

== Results ==
=== Men ===
Rank	Name	Nation	CP	SP	FP	Placings
1	Sergei Volkov	Soviet Union	1	6	4	13
2	Vladimir Kovalev	Soviet Union	3	4	3	27
3	John Curry	United Kingdom	2	2	5	23
4	Toller Cranston	Canada	4	3	2	29
5	Gordon McKellen Jr.	United States	5	5	7	48
6	Yuri Ovchinnikov	Soviet Union	9	1	6	53
7	Terry Kubicka	United States	11	7	1	61
8	Ron Shaver	Canada	6	9	9	76
9	László Vajda	Hungary	9	10	10	81
10	Minoru Sano	Japan	10	8	8	86
11	Zdeněk Pazdírek	Czechoslovakia	7	12	17	108
12	Robin Cousins	United Kingdom	15	11	11	114
13	Didier Gailhaguet	France	12	13	14	114
14	Bernd Wunderlich	East Germany	13	16	15	129
15	Ronald Koppelent	Austria	16	14	12	132
16	Mitsuru Matsumura	Japan	17	17	13	145
17	František Pechar	Czechoslovakia	14	15	18	147
18	Robert Rubens	Canada	18	18	16	153
19	Gilles Beyer	France	19	19	21	173
20	Paul Cechmanek	Luxembourg	20	21	20	180
21	William Schober	Australia	22	20	19	187
22	Flemming Söderquist	Denmark	21	22	22	198

Referee:

- Benjamin Wright United Kingdom

Assistant Referee:

- Donald H. Gilchrist Canada

Judges:

- Evgenia Bogdanova Soviet Union
- Éva György Hungary
- Ardelle K. Sanderson United States
- Kinuko Ueno Japan
- Günter Teichmann East Germany
- Ralph S. McCreath Canada
- Monique Georgelin France
- Mary Groombridge United Kingdom

Substitute judge:

- Sydney R. Croll Australia

=== Ladies ===
Rank	Name	Nation	CP	SP	FP	Placings
1	Dianne de Leeuw	Netherlands	1	1	2	9
2	Dorothy Hamill	United States	5	6	1	25
3	Christine Errath	East Germany	6	2	4	31
4	Wendy Burge	United States	8	5	3	36
5	Kath Malmberg	United States	4	4	10	46
6	Isabel de Navarre	West Germany	3	7	8	53
7	Lynn Nightingale	Canada	13	3	5	56
8	Anett Pötzsch	East Germany	10	10	7	78
9	Susanna Driano	Italy	11	9	6	81
10	Marion Weber	East Germany	7	17	12	92
11	Liana Drahová	Czechoslovakia	9	12	14	104
12	Kim Alletson	Canada	14	11	9	107
13	Emi Watanabe	Japan	17	13	11	114
14	Gerti Schanderl	West Germany	15	8	13	118
15	Liudmila Bakonina	Soviet Union	21	16	15	136
16	Sonja Balun	Austria	12	20	19	148
17	Dagmar Lurz	West Germany	20	14	16	159
18	Hana Knapová	Czechoslovakia	24	19	17	166
19	Marie-Claude Bierre	France	25	15	18	168
20	Gail Keddie	United Kingdom	16	22	23	192
21	Karin Iten	Switzerland	2	27	27	194
22	Yun Hyo-jean	South Korea	23	18	21	196
23	Evi Köpfli	Switzerland	19	21	24	203
24	Michelle Haider	Switzerland	22	25	20	205
25	Sharon Burley	Australia	18	23	26	211
26	Anne-Marie Verlaan	Netherlands	26	24	25	232
27	Sophie Verlaan	Netherlands	27	26	22	240

Referee:

- Josef Dědič West Germany

Assistant Referee:

- Sonia Bianchetti Italy

Judges:

- Walburga Grimm East Germany
- János Zsigmondy West Germany
- William Lewis Canada
- Thérèse Maisel France
- Ludwig Gassner Austria
- Ramona McIntyre United States
- Jacqueline Itschner Switzerland
- Elsbeth Bon Netherlands
- Kazuo Ohashi Japan

Substitute judge:

- Pamela Davis United Kingdom

=== Pairs ===
Rank	Name	Nation	SP	FP	Placings
1	Irina Rodnina / Alexander Zaitsev	Soviet Union	1	1	9
2	Romy Kermer / Rolf Österreich	East Germany	2	2	19
3	Manuela Groß / Uwe Kagelmann	East Germany	4	3	27
4	Irina Vorobieva / Alexander Vlasov	Soviet Union	3	4	37
5	Marina Leonidova / Vladimir Bogolyubov	Soviet Union	6	5	51
6	Melissa Militano / Johnny Johns	United States	5	7	57
7	Kerstin Stolfig / Veit Kempe	East Germany	7	6	55
8	Karin Künzle / Christian Künzle	Switzerland	9	8	71
9	Corinna Halke / Eberhard Rausch	West Germany	8	9	84
10	Tai Babilonia / Randy Gardner	United States	10	10	90
11	Candace Jones / Don Fraser	Canada	11	11	98
12	Ursula Nemec / Michael Nemec	Austria	13	12	109
13	Grażyna Kostrzewińska / Adam Brodecki	Poland	12	13	113
14	Kathy Hutchinson / Jamie McGrigor	Canada	14	14	125

Referee:

- Elemér Terták Hungary

Assistant Referee:

- Oskar Madl Austria

Judges:

- Jane Sullivan United States
- Elsbeth Bon Netherlands
- János Zsigmondy West Germany
- Irina Absaliamova Soviet Union
- Walburga Grimm East Germany
- Audrey Williams Canada
- Maria Zuchowicz Poland
- Jürg Wilhelm Switzerland
- Ludwig Gassner Austria

Substitute judge:

- Sydney R. Croll Australia

=== Ice dancing ===
Rank	Name	Nation	CD	FD	Placings
1	Irina Moiseeva / Andrei Minenkov	Soviet Union	2	1	13
2	Colleen O'Connor / Jim Millns	United States	1	2	19
3	Hilary Green / Glyn Watts	United Kingdom	4	3	30
4	Natalia Linichuk / Gennadi Karponosov	Soviet Union	3	4	36
5	Matilde Ciccia / Lamberto Ceserani	Italy	5	5	44
6	Krisztina Regőczy / András Sallay	Hungary	6	6	48
7	Teresa Weyna / Piotr Bojańczyk	Poland	8	8	71
8	Janet Thompson / Warren Maxwell	United Kingdom	7	9	71
9	Barbara Berezowski / David Porter	Canada	9	7	78
10	Eva Peštová / Jiři Pokorný	Czechoslovakia	10	10	94
11	Kay Barsdell / Kenneth Foster	United Kingdom	11	11	101
12	Judi Genovesi / Kent Weigle	United States	12	12	104
13	Susan Carscallen / Eric Gillies	Canada	13	13	110
14	Halina Gordon / Wojciech Bankowski	Poland	14	14	126

Referee:

- Lawrence Demmy United Kingdom

Assistant Referee:

- Edith M. Shoemaker United States

Judges:

- Courtney Jones United Kingdom
- Igor Kabanov Soviet Union
- Cia Bordogna Italy
- Vera Spurná Czechoslovakia
- Maria Zuchowicz Poland
- Pierrette Devine Canada
- Jürg Wilhelm Switzerland
- Mabel Graham United States
- Klára Kozári Hungary
