= 1976 World Figure Skating Championships =

Annual figure skating competition held in 1976

- Type: ISU Championship
- Date: March 2 – 7
- Season: 1975–76
- Location: Gothenburg, Sweden
- Venue: Scandinavium

Champions
- Men's singles: (United Kingdom) John Curry
- Ladies' singles: (United States) Dorothy Hamill
- Pairs: (Soviet Union) Irina Rodnina / Alexander Zaitsev
- Ice dance: (Soviet Union) Lyudmila Pakhomova / Alexandr Gorshkov
- Previous: 1975 World Championships
- Next: 1977 World Championships

The 1976 World Figure Skating Championships were held at the Scandinavium in Gothenburg, Sweden from 2 to 7 March. At the event, sanctioned by the International Skating Union, medals were awarded in men's singles, ladies' singles, pair skating, and ice dancing.

== Medal tables ==
=== Medalists ===
Discipline	Gold	Silver	Bronze
Men's singles	(United Kingdom) John Curry	(Soviet Union) Vladimir Kovalyov	(East Germany) Jan Hoffmann
Ladies' singles	(United States) Dorothy Hamill	(East Germany) Christine Errath	(Netherlands) Dianne de Leeuw
Pair skating	(Soviet Union) Irina Rodnina / Alexander Zaitsev	(East Germany) Romy Kermer / Rolf Österreich	(Soviet Union) Irina Vorobieva / Aleksandr Vlasov
Ice dancing	(Soviet Union) Lyudmila Pakhomova / Alexandr Gorshkov	(Soviet Union) Irina Moiseeva / Andrej Minenkov	(United States) Colleen O'Connor / James Millns

=== Medals by country ===
Rank	Nation	Gold	Silver	Bronze	Total
1	Soviet Union (URS)	2	2	1	5
2	United States (USA)	1	0	1	2
3	Great Britain (GBR)	1	0	0	1
4	East Germany (GDR)	0	2	1	3
5	Netherlands (NED)	0	0	1	1
Totals (5 entries)		4	4	4	12

== Results ==
=== Men ===
Rank	Name	Nation	CP	SP	FP	Points	Placings
1	John Curry	United Kingdom	2	3	1	191.18	13
2	Vladimir Kovalyov	Soviet Union	1	5	4	189.84	15
3	Jan Hoffmann	East Germany	3	2	3	187.92	29
4	Toller Cranston	Canada	5	1	2	186.26	34
5	David Santee	United States	4	7	7	184.34	47
6	Terry Kubicka	United States	7	4	5	183.33	52
7	Minoru Sano	Japan	6	6	6	181.22	62
8	Igor Bobrin	Soviet Union	8	10	9	175.46	74
9	Robin Cousins	United Kingdom	14	8	8	173.78	79
10	Pekka Leskinen	Finland	10	11	13	168.36	102
11	Konstantin Kokora	Soviet Union	11	12	10	168.96	101
12	Mitsuru Matsumura	Japan	13	9	11		101
13	Christophe Boyadjian	France	12	13	15		124
14	Zdeněk Pazdírek	Czechoslovakia	9	15	16		125
15	Grzegorz Głowania	Poland	20	14	12		139.5
16	Ted Barton	Canada	17	17	14		139.5
17	Kenneth Polk	Canada	15	16	18		142
18	Glyn Jones	United Kingdom	19	20	17		163
19	Gerd-Walter Gräbner	West Germany	18	19	19		173
20	Thomas Öberg	Sweden	16	18	20		175
21	Flemming Söderquist	Denmark	21	21	21		189

Referee:

- Sonia Bianchetti Italy

Assistant Referee:

- Benjamin Wright United Kingdom

Judges:

- Pamela Peat United Kingdom
- Charles U. Foster United States
- Sergei Kononykhin Soviet Union
- Elof Niklasson Sweden
- Joan Maclagan Canada
- Monique Georgelin France
- Kinuko Ueno Japan
- Walburga Grimm East Germany
- Tadeusz Malinowski Hungary

Substitute judge:

- Inkeri Soininen Finland

=== Women ===
Rank	Name	Nation	CP	SP	FP	Points	Placings
1	Dorothy Hamill	United States	2	1	1	192.66	10
2	Christine Errath	East Germany	4	2	2	190.04	22
3	Dianne de Leeuw	Netherlands	3	3	4	189.94	22
4	Anett Pötzsch	East Germany	5	6	5	185.16	41
5	Linda Fratianne	United States	6	5	3	185.16	43
6	Isabel de Navarre	West Germany	1	7	12	183.22	55
7	Lynn Nightingale	Canada	7	4	8	180.44	66
8	Wendy Burge	United States	8	8	6	180.22	69
9	Dagmar Lurz	West Germany	9	10	7	178.44	80
10	Susanna Driano	Italy	10	9	10	176.24	88
11	Elena Vodorezova	Soviet Union	15	12	9	172.82	103
12	Kim Alletson	Canada	13	11	11		105
13	Karena Richardson	United Kingdom	14	13	14		117
14	Grażyna Dudek	Poland	17	15	15		131
15	Denise Biellmann	Switzerland	21	18	13		138
16	Claudia Kristofics-Binder	Austria	16	19	16		149
17	Emi Watanabe	Japan	11	16	18		146
18	Eva Ďurišinová	Czechoslovakia	18	17	17		158
19	Yun Hyo-jean	South Korea	12	22	20		177
20	Niina Kyöttinen	Finland	22	14	21	156.24	178
21	Lise-Lotte Öberg	Sweden	19	20	19		182
22	Sharon Burley	Australia	20	21	22		197
23	Bente Larsen	Norway	25	23	23		208
24	Stella Bristing	Denmark	24	24	24		215
25	Gay Le Comte	New Zealand	23	25	25		225

Referee:

- Elemér Terták Hungary

Assistant Referee:

- Oskar Madl Austria

Judges:

- Irina Absaliamova Soviet Union
- Oskar Urban Czechoslovakia
- Erika Schiechtl West Germany
- Toshio Suzuki Japan
- Yvonne S. McGowan United States
- David Dore Canada
- Paul Engelfriet Netherlands
- Helga von Wiecki East Germany
- Pamela Daveis United Kingdom

Substitute judge:

- Berit Aarnes Norway

=== Pairs ===
Rank	Name	Nation	SP	FP	Points	Placings
1	Irina Rodnina / Alexander Zaitsev	Soviet Union	1	1	140.94	9
2	Romy Kermer / Rolf Österreich	East Germany	2	2	136.88	23
3	Irina Vorobieva / Alexander Vlasov	Soviet Union	3	3	136.36	28
4	Manuela Groß / Uwe Kagelmann	East Germany	4	4	135.71	30
5	Tai Babilonia / Randy Gardner	United States	5	6	132.16	48
6	Nadezhda Gorshkova / Evgeni Shevalovski	Soviet Union	6	5	131.90	51
7	Kerstin Stolfig / Veit Kempe	East Germany	7	7	129.00	64
8	Corinna Halke / Eberhard Rausch	West Germany	8	8	127.24	71
9	Alice Cook / William Fauver	United States	9	9	123.30	86
10	Ingrid Spieglová / Alan Spiegl	Czechoslovakia	10	10	121.43	92.5
11	Ursula Nemec / Michael Nemec	Austria	11	11		95
12	Candace Jones / Don Fraser	Canada	12	12		110.5
13	Gabrielle Beck / Jochen Stahl	West Germany	13	13		111

Referee:

- Donald H. Gilchrist Canada

Assistant Referee:

- Hans Kutschera Austria

Judges:

- Ardelle K. Sanderson United States
- Giordano Abbondati Italy
- Oskar Urban Czechoslovakia
- Walburga Grimm East Germany
- Willi Wernz West Germany
- Sydney R. Croll Australia
- Valentin Piseev Soviet Union
- Dorothy MacLeod Canada
- Norbert Cerny Austria

Substitute judge:

- Markus Germann Switzerland

=== Ice dancing ===
Rank	Name	Nation	CD	FD	Points	Placings
1	Lyudmila Pakhomova / Alexander Gorshkov	Soviet Union	1	1	211.52	9
2	Irina Moiseeva / Andrei Minenkov	Soviet Union	2	2	205.44	19
3	Colleen O'Connor / Jim Millns	United States	3	3	202.92	28
4	Krisztina Regőczy / András Sallay	Hungary	4	4	200.32	36
5	Natalia Linichuk / Gennadi Karponosov	Soviet Union	5	5	198.46	43
6	Janet Thompson / Warren Maxwell	United Kingdom	6	6	192.52	55
7	Barbara Berezowski / David Porter	Canada	9	8	187.66	71
8	Eva Peštová / Jiři Pokorný	Czechoslovakia	8	9	185.60	78
9	Teresa Weyna / Piotr Bojańczyk	Poland	7	7	187.42	75
10	Susan Carscallen / Eric Gillies	Canada	10	10	182.78	91
11	Kay Barsdell / Kenneth Foster	United Kingdom	11	11		97
12	Susi Handschmann / Peter Handschmann	Austria	12	12		105
13	Judi Genovesi / Kent Weigle	United States	13	13		119
14	Stefania Bertele / Walter Cecconi	Italy	14	14		127
15	Isabella Rizzi / Luigi Freroni	Italy	15	15		128
16	Marie-Joëlle Michel / Frédéric Garcin	France	16	16		149
17	Elżbieta Wegrzyk / Andrzej Alberciak	Poland	17	18		156
18	Susan Kelley / Andrew Stroukoff	United States	18	17		155
19	Gabriele Schäfer / Robert Dietz	West Germany	19	19		169

Referee:

- Lawrence Demmy United Kingdom

Assistant Referee:

- George J. Blundun Canada

Judges:

- Maria Zuchowicz Poland
- Robert Hudson United Kingdom
- Willi Wernz West Germany
- Elaine DeMore United States
- Edwin Kucharz Austria
- Giovanni Bozetti Italy
- Irina Absliamova Soviet Union
- Klára Kozári Hungary
- Dagmar Řeháková Czechoslovakia

Substitute judge:

- Joyce Hisey Canada
