= Figure skating at the 1976 Winter Olympics =

Figure skating at the XII Winter Olympics
- Type: Olympic Games
- Venue: Olympiahalle; Innsbruck, Austria

Champions
- Men's singles: (United Kingdom) John Curry
- Ladies' singles: (United States) Dorothy Hamill
- Pairs: (Soviet Union) Irina Rodnina / Alexander Zaitsev
- Ice dance: (Soviet Union) Liudmila Pakhomova / Alexander Gorshkov
- Previous: 1972 Winter Olympics
- Next: 1980 Winter Olympics

Figure skating at the 1976 Winter Olympics took place at the Olympiahalle in Innsbruck, Austria. Ice dance was introduced for the first time as an Olympic event at these Games.

== Medal table ==
Rank	Nation	Gold	Silver	Bronze	Total
1	Soviet Union	2	2	0	4
2	United States	1	0	1	2
3	Great Britain	1	0	0	1
4	East Germany	0	1	2	3
5	Netherlands	0	1	0	1
6	Canada	0	0	1	1
Totals (6 entries)		4	4	4	12

== Results ==
=== Men's singles ===
Rank	Name	Nation	Points	Places	CF	SP	FS
1	John Curry	Great Britain	192.74	11	2	2	1
2	Vladimir Kovalev	Soviet Union	187.64	28	3	6	4
3	Toller Cranston	Canada	187.38	30	7	1	2
4	Jan Hoffmann	East Germany	187.34	34	4	9	5
5	Sergei Volkov	Soviet Union	184.08	53	1	5	9
6	David Santee	United States	184.28	49	5	4	6
7	Terry Kubicka	United States	183.30	56	11	10	3
8	Yuri Ovchinnikov	Soviet Union	180.04	75	12	8	7
9	Minoru Sano	Japan	178.72	79	9	7	10
10	Robin Cousins	Great Britain	178.14	83	14	11	8
11	Mitsuru Matsumura	Japan	172.48	99	16	12	11
12	Zdeněk Pazdírek	Czechoslovakia	172.48	106	8	13	12
13	Pekka Leskinen	Finland	166.98	119	13	14	14
14	Stan Bohonek	Canada	165.88	124	17	15	13
15	Jean-Christophe Simond	France	159.44	137	18	16	15
16	Glyn Jones	Great Britain	157.24	141	19	17	16
WD	Ron Shaver	Canada	Withdrew from competition		6	3	
WD	László Vajda	Hungary	Withdrew from competition		10	Withdrew from competition	
WD	Ronald Koppelent	Austria	Withdrew from competition		15	Withdrew from competition	
WD	William Schober	Australia	Withdrew from competition		20	Withdrew from competition	

=== Women's singles ===
Rank	Name	Nation	Points	Places	CF	SP	FS
1	Dorothy Hamill	United States	193.80	9	2	1	1
2	Dianne de Leeuw	Netherlands	190.24	20	3	4	2
3	Christine Errath	East Germany	188.16	28	5	2	3
4	Anett Pötzsch	East Germany	187.42	33	4	3	4
5	Isabel de Navarre	West Germany	182.42	59	1	11	12
6	Wendy Burge	United States	182.14	63	6	8	9
7	Susanna Driano	Italy	181.62	63	8	7	7
8	Linda Fratianne	United States	181.86	67	9	6	6
9	Lynn Nightingale	Canada	181.72	67	10	5	8
10	Dagmar Lurz	West Germany	178.04	92	7	10	11
11	Marion Weber	East Germany	175.82	99	12	9	10
12	Elena Vodorezova	Soviet Union	175.58	104	18	13	5
13	Emi Watanabe	Japan	171.72	118.5	11	12	15
14	Kim Alletson	Canada	171.64	122.5	13	14	13
15	Karena Richardson	Great Britain	166.52	137	17	15	14
16	Claudia Kristofics-Binder	Austria	162.88	149	15	18	16
17	Yun Hyo Jean (Jean Yun)	South Korea	159.64	158	14	16	19
18	Grażyna Dudek	Poland	159.48	159	20	20	17
19	Eva Ďurišinová	Czechoslovakia	158.22	162	19	17	18
20	Sharon Burley	Australia	149.26	180	21	19	20
WD	Danielle Rieder	Switzerland	Withdrew from competition		16	Withdrew from competition	

=== Pairs ===
Rank	Name	Nation	Points	Places	SP	FS
1	Irina Rodnina / Alexander Zaitsev	Soviet Union	140.54	9	1	1
2	Romy Kermer / Rolf Österreich	East Germany	136.35	21	2	2
3	Manuela Groß / Uwe Kagelmann	East Germany	134.57	34	4	3
4	Irina Vorobieva / Alexander Vlasov	Soviet Union	134.52	35	3	5
5	Tai Babilonia / Randy Gardner	United States	134.24	36	5	4
6	Kerstin Stolfig / Veit Kempe	East Germany	129.57	59	7	6
7	Karin Künzle / Christian Künzle	Switzerland	128.97	64	6	7
8	Corinna Halke / Eberhard Rausch	West Germany	127.37	72	8	8
9	Marina Leonidova / Vladimir Bogolyubov	Soviet Union	127.06	76	9	9
10	Ursula Nemec / Michael Nemec	Austria	121.30	96	12	10
11	Erika Taylforth / Colin Taylforth	Great Britain	120.40	108	10	12
12	Alice Cook / William Fauver	United States	119.36	106	11	13
13	Ingrid Spieglová / Alan Spiegl	Czechoslovakia	118.39	112	14	11
14	Candace Jones / Donald Fraser	Canada	116.54	117	13	14

=== Ice dance ===
Rank	Name	Nation	Points	Places	CD	FD
1	Lyudmila Pakhomova / Alexander Gorshkov	Soviet Union	209.92	9	1	1
2	Irina Moiseeva / Andrei Minenkov	Soviet Union	204.88	20	2	2
3	Colleen O'Connor / James Millns	United States	202.64	27	3	3
4	Natalia Linichuk / Gennadi Karponossov	Soviet Union	199.10	35	4	4
5	Krisztina Regőczy / András Sallay	Hungary	195.92	48.5	5	5
6	Matilde Ciccia / Lamberto Ceserani	Italy	191.46	58.5	7	6
7	Hilary Green / Glyn Watts	Great Britain	191.40	57	6	7
8	Janet Thompson / Warren Maxwell	Great Britain	186.80	78	8	8
9	Teresa Weyna / Piotr Bojanczyk	Poland	182.20	90	9	11
10	Barbara Berezowski / David Porter	Canada	182.90	86	10	9
11	Eva Peštová / Jiři Pokorný	Czechoslovakia	180.60	96	11	10
12	Kay Barsdell / Kenneth Foster	Great Britain	175.16	111	13	13
13	Susan Carscallen / Eric Gillies	Canada	175.96	107	14	12
14	Isabella Rizzi / Luigi Freroni	Italy	168.64	133	17	14
15	Judi Genovesi / Kent Weigle	United States	168.26	134	15	16
16	Stefania Bertele / Walter Cecconi	Italy	166.22	140	16	17
17	Susan Kelley / Andrew Stroukoff	United States	165.12	147	18	15
WD	Susanne Handschmann / Peter Handschmann	Austria	Withdrew from competition		12	Withdrew from competition
