= 1977 World Figure Skating Championships =

Annual figure skating competition held in 1977

- Type: ISU Championship
- Date: March 1 – 6
- Season: 1976–77
- Location: Tokyo, Japan
- Venue: Yoyogi National Stadium

Champions
- Men's singles: (Soviet Union) Vladimir Kovalev
- Ladies' singles: (United States) Linda Fratianne
- Pairs: (Soviet Union) Irina Rodnina / Alexander Zaitsev
- Ice dance: (Soviet Union) Irina Moiseeva / Andrei Minenkov
- Previous: 1976 World Championships
- Next: 1978 World Championships

The 1977 World Figure Skating Championships were held in Tokyo, Japan from March 1 to 6. At the event, sanctioned by the International Skating Union, medals were awarded in men's singles, ladies' singles, pair skating, and ice dancing.

== Medal tables ==
=== Medalists ===
Discipline	Gold	Silver	Bronze
Men's singles	(Soviet Union) Vladimir Kovalev	(East Germany) Jan Hoffmann	(Japan) Minoru Sano
Ladies' singles	(United States) Linda Fratianne	(East Germany) Anett Pötzsch	(West Germany) Dagmar Lurz
Pair skating	(Soviet Union) Irina Rodnina / Alexander Zaitsev	(Soviet Union) Irina Vorobieva / Aleksandr Vlasov	(United States) Tai Babilonia / Randy Gardner
Ice dancing	(Soviet Union) Irina Moiseeva / Andrej Minenkov	(United Kingdom) Janet Thompson / Warren Maxwell	(Soviet Union) Natalia Linichuk / Gennadi Karponosov

=== Medals by country ===
Rank	Nation	Gold	Silver	Bronze	Total
1	Soviet Union (URS)	3	1	1	5
2	United States (USA)	1	0	1	2
3	East Germany (GDR)	0	2	0	2
4	Great Britain (GBR)	0	1	0	1
5	Japan (JPN)	0	0	1	1
5	West Germany (FRG)	0	0	1	1
Totals (6 entries)		4	4	4	12

== Results ==
=== Men ===
Rank	Name	Nation	Age	CP		SP		FP		Points	Places
1	Vladimir Kovalev	Soviet Union	24	1	44.40	2	41.24	3	102.40	188.04	16
2	Jan Hoffmann	East Germany	21	2	42.52	1	41.04	2	103.40	186.96	18
3	Minoru Sano	Japan	21	6	39.44	4	39.96	1	105.70	185.10	24
4	David Santee	United States	19	4	42.04	9	37.92	5	99.70	179.66	40
5	Charles Tickner	United States	23	5	39.52	3	40.56	7	98.80	178.88	42
6	Ron Shaver	Canada	25	9	37.84	8	37.48	6	99.40	174.72	61
7	Yuri Ovchinnikov	Soviet Union	26	7	38.12	6	38.16	8	97.60	173.88	64
8	Mitsuru Matsumura	Japan	19	15	35.00	11	36.13	4	101.20	172.33	73
9	Scott Cramer	United States	18	8	38.20	10	37.60	9	95.90	171.70	73
10	Pekka Leskinen	Finland	23	3	42.00	12	35.12	11	92.90	170.02	89
11	Konstantin Kokora	Soviet Union	19	11	37.12	7	38.20	10	93.00	168.32	94
12	Ronald Koppelent	Austria	21	14	37.00	14	33.24	13	86.40	156.64	118
13	Kurt Kurzinger	West Germany		13	36.32	13	33.88	14	85.00	155.20	121
14	Brian Pockar	Canada	17	16	34.72	15	33.00	12	87.30	155.02	122
15	Jean-Christophe Simond	France	16	12	36.44	16	32.60	15	84.80	154.84	134
16	William Schober	Australia		17	32.64	17	34.80	16	77.30	144.74	144
17	Han Soo-bong	South Korea		18	31.20	18	26.52	17	71.90	129.62	153
WD	Robin Cousins	United Kingdom	19	10	37.72	5	40.08			DNF	

Referee:

- Josef Dědič Czechoslovakia

Assistant Referee:

- Kinuko Ueno Japan

Judges:

- Gerhardt Bubnik Czechoslovakia
- Erika Schiechtl West Germany
- Geoffrey Yates United Kingdom
- David Dore Canada
- Valentin Piseev Soviet Union
- Goro Ishimaru Japan
- Edith M. Shoemaker United States
- Helga von Wiecki East Germany
- Sydney R. Croll Australia

Substitute judge:

- Monique Georgelin France

=== Ladies ===
Rank	Name	Nation	Age	CP		SP		FP		Points	Places
1	Linda Fratianne	United States	16	4	44.44	1	41.72	2	103.10	189.26	10
2	Anett Pötzsch	East Germany	16	1	45.56	6	38.92	3	100.70	185.18	22
3	Dagmar Lurz	West Germany	18	2	45.08	3	39.20	8	98.20	182.48	43
4	Barbara Smith	United States		5	43.04	4	39.80	7	99.60	182.44	43
5	Wendy Burge	United States	19	7	41.48	2	40.32	4	101.10	182.90	41
6	Susanna Driano	Italy	19	3	43.88	7	38.88	9	98.20	180.96	50
7	Elena Vodorezova	Soviet Union	13	13	36.80	5	39.92	1	103.10	179.82	59
8	Lynn Nightingale	Canada	20	8	40.84	9	38.32	5	100.60	179.76	66
9	Marion Weber	East Germany	17	6	42.12	12	38.04	10	97.20	177.36	80
10	Denise Biellmann	Switzerland	14	12	37.68	8	38.44	6	100.10	176.22	87
11	Claudia Kristofics-Binder	Austria	15	9	39.96	10	37.72	12	95.00	172.68	103
12	Emi Watanabe	Japan	14	11	40.04	11	38.08	13	95.00	173.12	106
13	Heather Kemkaran	Canada	20	14	35.56	13	35.98	11	97.60	169.14	113
14	Garnet Ostermeier	West Germany	17	10	39.20	14	36.12	14	91.20	166.52	124
15	Karena Richardson	United Kingdom	17	19	32.36	16	35.52	15	91.80	159.68	133
16	Susan Broman	Finland	17	15	34.60	15	36.08	16	83.40	154.08	150
17	Robyn Burley	Australia		16	34.64	18	32.84	17	84.00	151.48	154
18	Maria-Claude Bierre	France		17	34.08	17	32.92	18	83.40	150.40	159
19	Franca Bianconi	Italy	15	21	31.52	20	30.80	19	82.30	144.62	176
20	Lee Hyun-joo	South Korea		18	32.72	21	30.88	21	80.60	144.20	178
21	Lotta Crispin	Sweden		20	31.64	19	31.44	20	80.30	143.38	182

Referee:

- Sonia Bianchetti Italy

Assistant Referee:

- Benjamin Wright United Kingdom

Judges:

- Giovanni De Mori Italy
- Günter Teichmann East Germany
- Jürg Wilhelm Switzerland
- Geoffrey Yates United Kingdom
- Yvonne S. McGowan United States
- Ludwig Gassner Austria
- Norris Bowden Canada
- Leena Vainio Finland
- Eugen Romminger West Germany

Substitute judge:

- Tsukasa Kimura Japan

=== Pairs ===
Rank	Name	Nation	Age	SP		FP		Points	Places
1	Irina Rodnina / Alexander Zaitsev	Soviet Union	27/24	1	34.90	1	105.60	140.50	9
2	Irina Vorobieva / Alexandr Vlasov	Soviet Union	18/20	2	34.56	3	101.60	136.16	23
3	Tai Babilonia / Randy Gardner	United States	16/18	3	33.45	2	102.20	135.65	29
4	Marina Cherkasova / Sergei Shakhrai	Soviet Union	12/18	4	33.68	5	97.80	131.48	39
5	Manuela Mager / Uwe Bewersdorf	East Germany	20/26	5	32.37	4	99.30	131.67	42
6	Ingrid Spieglová / Alan Spiegl	Czechoslovakia	16/17	6	31.57	6	95.00	126.57	57
7	Gail Hamula / Frank Sweiding	United States		7	30.70	7	94.40	125.10	63
8	Susanne Scheibe / Andreas Nischwitz	West Germany	/19	8	30.58	9	91.40	121.98	78
9	Sheryl Franks / Michael Botticelli	United States	14/17	9	30.34	8	93.10	123.44	73
10	Sherri Baier / Robin Cowan	Canada		11	27.90	10	88.50	116.40	91
11	Gabrielle Beck / Jochen Stahl	West Germany		10	28.74	11	87.80	116.54	96
12	Elizabeth Cain / Peter Cain	Australia	14/18	13	26.87	12	85.50	112.37	106
13	Kyoko Hagiwara / Sumio Murata	Japan		12	27.44	13	79.50	106.94	116

Referee:

- Donald H. Gilchrist Canada

Assistant Referee:

- Kikuko Minami Japan

Judges:

- Gerhardt Bubnik Czechoslovakia
- Erika Schiechtl West Germany
- Geoffrey Yates United Kingdom
- David Dore Canada
- Valentin Piseev Soviet Union
- Goro Ishimaru Japan
- Edith M. Shoemaker United States
- Helga von Wiecki East Germany
- Sydney R. Croll Australia

Substitute judge:

- Monique Georgelin France

=== Ice dancing ===
Rank	Name	Nation	Age	CD		FD		Points	Places
1	Irina Moiseeva / Andrei Minenkov	Soviet Union	21/22	1	102.32	1	105.50	207.82	9
2	Janet Thompson / Warren Maxwell	United Kingdom	21/24	2	99.16	2	102.50	201.66	24
3	Natalia Linichuk / Gennadi Karponosov	Soviet Union	20/26	4	97.72	3	102.20	199.92	28
4	Krisztina Regőczy / András Sallay	Hungary	21/23	3	98.80	4	101.90	200.70	29
5	Marina Zueva / Andrei Vitman	Soviet Union	20/	5	94.56	5	100.10	194.66	45
6	Susan Carscallen / Eric Gillies	Canada	22/24	6	92.80	7	96.10	188.90	58
7	Kay Barsdell / Kenneth Foster	United Kingdom		7	91.32	6	95.90	187.22	65
8	Liliana Řeháková / Stanislav Drastich	Czechoslovakia	18/22	9	89.68	8	95.30	184.98	73
9	Judi Genovesi / Kent Weigle	United States	19/21	8	88.92	9	94.30	183.22	77
10	Lorna Wighton / John Dowding	Canada	18/19	10	87.08	10	92.60	179.68	90
11	Isabella Rizzi / Luigi Freroni	Italy		11	83.88	11	90.20	174.08	100
12	Susan Kelley / Andrew Stroukoff	United States	22/26	13	82.12	12	88.90	171.02	108
13	Susi Handschmann / Peter Handschmann	Austria	18/19	12	83.40	13	85.60	169.00	116
14	Misa Kage / Masanori Takeda	Japan		14	80.32	14	84.50	164.82	123

Referee:

- Lawrence Demmy United Kingdom

Assistant Referee:

- George J. Blundun Canada

Judges:

- Ludwig Gassner Austria
- Pamela Davis United Kingdom
- Klára Kozári Hungary
- Mary Louise Wright United States
- Ennio Bernazzali Italy
- Irina Absliamova Soviet Union
- Gerhardt Bubnik Czechoslovakia
- Tsukasa Kimura Japan
- Joyce Hisey Canada

Substitute judge:

- Eugen Romminger West Germany

== Sources ==
- US Pair Is 3d After Start of World Skating
- Miss Rodnina, Zaitsev Win Fifth Straight Skating Title
