= László Vajda =

László Vajda may refer to:

- Ladislao Vajda, Hungarian director
- Ladislaus Vajda, Hungarian screenwriter
- László Vajda (figure skater), Hungarian figure skater
