= Dorothy Hamill =

American figure skater

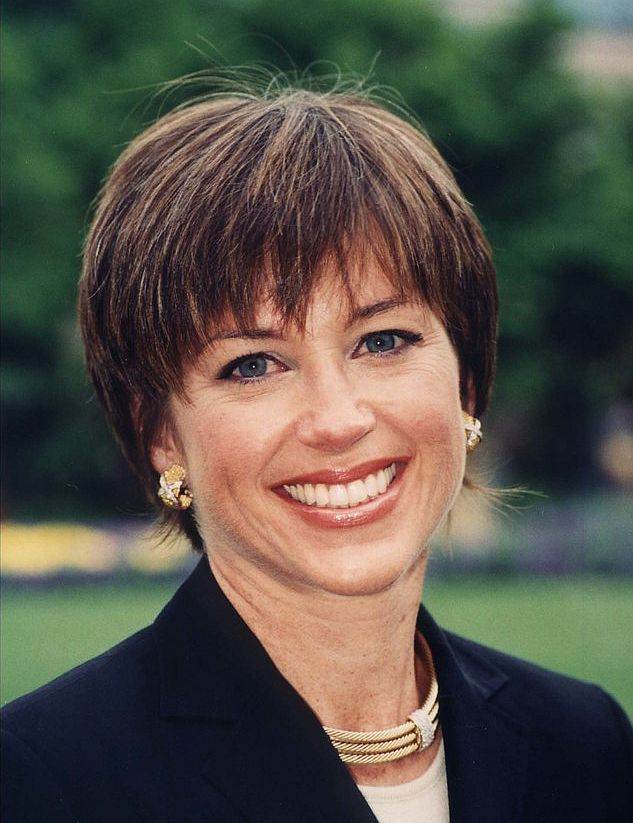
- Hamill in 2001

Personal information
- Born: Dorothy Stuart Hamill; July 26, 1956 (age 70) Chicago, Illinois, U.S.
- Height: 5 ft 4 in (163 cm)
- Spouses: Dean Paul Martin (m. 1982; div. 1984) Kenneth Forsythe (m. 1987; div. 1995) John MacColl (m. 2009)

Figure skating career
- Country: United States
- Retired: 1976
Medal record
Figure skating: Ladies' singles
Representing the United States
Winter Olympics
Gold medal – first place	1976 Innsbruck	Ladies' singles
World Championships
Gold medal – first place	1976 Gothenburg	Ladies' singles
Silver medal – second place	1975 Colorado Springs	Ladies' singles
Silver medal – second place	1974 Munich	Ladies' singles

Dorothy Stuart Hamill (born July 26, 1956) is a retired American figure skater. She is the 1976 Olympic champion and 1976 World champion in ladies' singles.

== Early life ==
Hamill was born in Chicago, Illinois, to Chalmers and Carol Hamill. Her father was a mechanical engineer. Shortly after her birth, her family moved to the Riverside neighborhood of Greenwich, Connecticut, where Hamill spent the rest of her childhood. She has two older siblings, a brother, Sandy, and a sister, Marcia.

Hamill started skating in early 1965 at the age of 8, taking weekly group lessons. She became more serious about the sport the next season, taking regular private lessons and passing her preliminary and first figure test before the seasonal rink closed in March. She would wake early in the morning to go to the rink for practice at 4:30 am. Hamill was first coached by Otto Gold and Gustave Lussi. Ice time was limited in her area, so she eventually began training at Sky Rink in New York City, staying overnight in the city with friends when possible. In the summers, Hamill trained in Lake Placid, New York, and later in Toronto with her coach at the time, Sonya Dunfield. During her career, her father would spend up to $20,000 a year on her skating expenses, including skating lessons, travel, living expenses, and costumes.

Until the spring of 1970, Hamill attended public schools in Riverside, but at that point she switched to a small school with flexible tutoring to accommodate her skating schedule. She attended Colorado Academy high school, graduating in 1974.

== Career ==
Hamill's first national success came in 1969, when she won the novice ladies' title at the U.S. Championships at the age of 12. Later that spring, Hamill was invited to perform in Madison Square Garden with the exhibition tour (in later years known as Champions on Ice) that followed the 1969 World Figure Skating Championships. She placed second at the junior level at the 1970 Championships, and made her senior debut in 1971. The U.S. Figure Skating Association arranged for her to be coached by Carlo Fassi when she began to compete internationally.

Hamill was U.S. champion from 1974 to 1976. At the 1974 World Championships in Munich, Germany, she was in 3rd place after the compulsory figures and the short program. She was set to skate directly after the West German skater Gerti Schanderl, whose marks were booed while Hamill was already on the ice. Visibly upset, Hamill left the ice and burst into tears. After the crowd settled down, she returned to the ice and won the silver medal behind Christine Errath of East Germany.

Hamill competed with an injured right leg at the 1975 U.S. Championships. She said her leg was fine after receiving treatment for a pulled hamstring (earlier believed to be pulled ligaments) while training in Denver during the month before the 1975 World Championships. She won silver at Worlds in Colorado Springs, Colorado, behind Dianne de Leeuw of the Netherlands and ahead of Errath.

Hamill was disappointed by her performance at the 1976 U.S. Championships, admitting that she was outskated by Linda Fratianne because she had not trained properly. Immediately after the national championships, her coach Carlo Fassi left the U.S. to accompany his other star pupil, John Curry, to the European Championships, leaving Hamill coachless with the Olympics only a few weeks away. She began training with Peter Burrows instead. She was pleased with their work together and wanted to bring him to the Olympics as her coach of record. However, the USFSA refused her request, and she was reunited with Fassi for a brief period of training in Germany before the Olympics.

At the 1976 Winter Olympics in Innsbruck, Austria, Hamill came in second in the figures and then won the short and long programs, taking the gold medal. She was the last single skater to win the Olympics without a triple jump. Hamill also won the 1976 World Championships, and then turned professional.

Hamill is credited with developing a new skating move, a camel spin that turns into a sit spin, which became known as the "Hamill camel." The bobbed hairstyle that she wore during her Olympic performance was created by stylist Yusuke Suga and started a fad, known as the "short and sassy" look. Her eyeglasses with oversized frames also started a trend in the 1970s. The media dubbed her "America's sweetheart." Her skating style was considered "athletic" and was compared to the more artistic skating style of fellow skaters Peggy Fleming and Janet Lynn, although she was also praised for her elegant lines and carriage. According to figure skating writing and historian Ellyn Kestnbaum, Hamill, along with Lynn, "evoked associations with natural, outdoorsy wholesomeness", due to their athleticism, speed, freedom of movement, and appearance, which Kestnbaum states were "images that resonated with both conservative and feminist ideologies during the 1970s".

Hamill became the face of Clairol's Short & Sassy shampoo and conditioner. After her performance in the 1976 Olympics, which was viewed by millions globally, her iconic wedge haircut became a trend among women and girls. Ads for Short & Sassy, both on TV and in print, highlighted Hamill's lustrous dark hair as she gracefully glided on the ice.

Hamill was an Ice Capades headliner from 1977 to 1984. She was asked to join Ice Capades by Donna Atwood, who had been its star for years and who had eventually acquired financial control of the Ice Capades. Hamill was asked to be Atwood's successor as its new star. After Ice Capades folded due to competition and changing tastes, Hamill and her husband bought the financially strapped company's assets in 1993 in an effort to revive its earlier success, but they declared bankruptcy in 1994. It was sold to Pat Robertson's International Family Entertainment, Inc. in 1995.

In 1993, the Associated Press released results of a national sports study showing that Hamill was statistically tied for first place with fellow Olympian Mary Lou Retton as the most popular athlete in America, ranking far ahead of other major sports stars such as Michael Jordan, Magic Johnson, Troy Aikman, Dan Marino, Wayne Gretzky, Joe Montana, Nolan Ryan, and 800 other athletes.

At 40, Hamill experienced debilitating chronic pain and was later diagnosed with osteoarthritis. Her condition responded well to medication and she was able to return to skating professionally.

Hamill has continued to skate in shows, including a regular principal role with Broadway on Ice. She was a special guest in the Brian Boitano–Barry Manilow skating extravaganza at AT&T Park in San Francisco in 2007.

In February 2013, it was revealed that Hamill would take part in the sixteenth season of Dancing with the Stars, partnering with Tristan MacManus. After only two dances, on March 26, 2013, she was forced to withdraw from the competition upon advice from her spine surgeon due to a severe strain on her lower back sustained during practice.

On March 3, 2017, Hamill was announced as one of 16 celebrities taking part in a cooking competition on the Food Network TV series Chopped. She was featured in the "Star Power: Culinary Muscle" episode, alongside former NFL player LaMarr Woodley, Olympic medalist fencer Mariel Zagunis, and UFC fighter Paige VanZant. Hamill was the third and last contestant to be eliminated, narrowly missing out on advancing to the final heat, losing to Paige VanZant in the final round.

== Personal life ==
Hamill wrote an autobiography titled On and Off the Ice. She was married and divorced twice: to Dean Paul Martin (1982–1984), and then to Kenneth Forsythe (1987–1995), with whom she had a daughter named Alexandra (1988-2025). Hamill married her third husband, John MacColl, in 2009. Her second autobiography A Skating Life: My Story, was published in 2007.

For much of her adult life, Hamill has experienced chronic depression, which is controlled through medication and therapy. Her daughter also suffered from the condition. In her autobiography she describes her condition as atypical seasonal affective disorder, which, unlike most such cases, tends to flare up for her in the summer rather than the winter. In 2008, Hamill announced that she was being treated for breast cancer.

Hamill was a mentor to 2010 U.S. national champion Rachael Flatt. Flatt, like Hamill, trained in Colorado Springs, Colorado.

== Results ==
International
Event	68–69	69–70	70–71	71–72	72–73	73–74	74–75	75–76
Winter Olympics								1st
World Champ.				7th	4th	2nd	2nd	1st
Nebelhorn Trophy				1st				
Prague Skate					1st			
Richmond Trophy					1st			
St. Gervais				1st				
National
U.S. Champ.	1st N	2nd J	5th	4th	2nd	1st	1st	1st
Levels: N = Novice; J = Junior

== Records and achievements ==
=== Amateur ===
- Olympic Champion (1976)
- World Champion (1976)
- Three-time United States National Champion (1974–1976)
- Invented the Hamill camel, a camel spin followed by a sit spin

=== Professional ===
- World Professional Champion (1983–1987)

=== Awards ===
- Awarded the National Young American Award by the Boy Scouts of America
- Won Daytime Emmy Award – Outstanding Individual Achievement in the Performing Arts – Host/Hostess for Romeo and Juliet on Ice (1983)
- Inducted into the United States Figure Skating Hall of Fame (1991)
- Golden Plate Award of the American Academy of Achievement (1996)
- Inducted into the World Figure Skating Hall of Fame (2000)
- The "Dorothy Hamill Skating Rink" in her hometown of Greenwich, Connecticut, is named after her.
