= Irina Rodnina =

Russian politician and figure skater

- Ирина Роднина
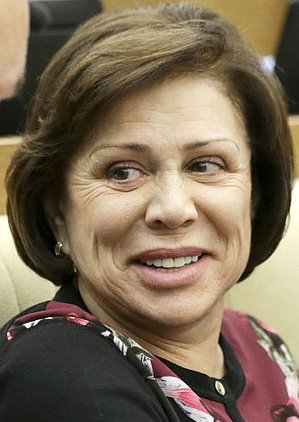
- Rodnina in 2018

Member of the State Duma for Moscow Oblast
- Incumbent
- Assumed office 5 October 2016
- Preceded by: constituency re-established
- Constituency: Dmitrov (No. 118)

Member of the State Duma (Party List Seat)
- In office 24 December 2007 – 5 October 2016

Personal details
- Born: 12 September 1949 (age 77) Moscow, RSFSR, USSR
- Party: United Russia; CPSU (until 1991)
- Height: 152 cm (5 ft 0 in)
- Spouse(s): Alexander Zaitsev (m. 1975; div. 1985) Leonid Minkovski (m. 1985, divorced)
- Children: Alexander Alexandrovich Zaitsev; Alena Leonidovna Minkovskaya
- Education: State Central Order of Lenin Institute of Physical Culture
- Figure skating career
- Country: Soviet Union
- Partner: Alexei Ulanov (1964–1972); Alexander Zaitsev (1972–1980)
- Coach: Stanislav Zhuk (1964–1974); Tatiana Tarasova (1974–1980)
- Skating club: Armed Forces (sports society)
- Retired: 1980
Medal record
Representing Soviet Union
Pairs' Figure skating
Olympic Games
Gold medal – first place	1972 Sapporo	Pairs
Gold medal – first place	1976 Innsbruck	Pairs
Gold medal – first place	1980 Lake Placid	Pairs
World Championships
Gold medal – first place	1969 Colorado Springs	Pairs
Gold medal – first place	1970 Ljubljana	Pairs
Gold medal – first place	1971 Lyon	Pairs
Gold medal – first place	1972 Calgary	Pairs
Gold medal – first place	1973 Bratislava	Pairs
Gold medal – first place	1974 Munich	Pairs
Gold medal – first place	1975 Colorado Springs	Pairs
Gold medal – first place	1976 Gothenburg	Pairs
Gold medal – first place	1977 Tokyo	Pairs
Gold medal – first place	1978 Ottawa	Pairs
European Championships
Gold medal – first place	1969 Garmisch-Partenkirchen	Pairs
Gold medal – first place	1970 Leningrad	Pairs
Gold medal – first place	1971 Zürich	Pairs
Gold medal – first place	1972 Gothenburg	Pairs
Gold medal – first place	1973 Cologne	Pairs
Gold medal – first place	1974 Zagreb	Pairs
Gold medal – first place	1975 Copenhagen	Pairs
Gold medal – first place	1976 Geneva	Pairs
Gold medal – first place	1977 Helsinki	Pairs
Gold medal – first place	1978 Strasbourg	Pairs
Gold medal – first place	1980 Gothenburg	Pairs

Irina Konstantinovna Rodnina (Russian: Ирина Константиновна Роднина, IPA: [ɪˈrʲinə kənstɐnˈtʲinəvnə rədʲnʲɪˈna]; born 12 September 1949) is a Russian politician and retired figure skater, who is the only pair skater to win 10 successive World Championships (1969–78) and three successive Olympic gold medals (1972, 1976, 1980). She was elected to the State Duma in the 2007 legislative election as a member of President Vladimir Putin's United Russia party. As a figure skater, she initially competed with Alexei Ulanov and later teamed up with Alexander Zaitsev. She is the first pair skater to win the Olympic title with two different partners, followed only by Artur Dmitriev.

== Early life and family ==
Rodnina was born in Moscow on 12 September 1949. Her father was Soviet Army officer Konstantin (Nikolaevich) Rodnin, from a village named Yaminovo on the outskirts of Vologda. Her mother was Ukrainian Jewish paramedic Yulia (Yakovlevna) Rodnina. Her parents met each other during the Second World War, and both took part in the Soviet invasion of Manchuria against the Empire of Japan as the war came to a close. She has an older sister, Valentina, who worked as an engineer. As a young child, Rodnina was often sick, suffering from pneumonia eleven times. On the advice of her doctor to give Rodnina additional exercise and outdoor time, and in 1954 took her to an ice rink for the first time at Pryamikov Children Park of Moscow.

== Figure skating career ==
Since the sixth form of secondary school, age 13, she trained at Children and Youth Sports School of CSKA on Leningradsky Prospekt.

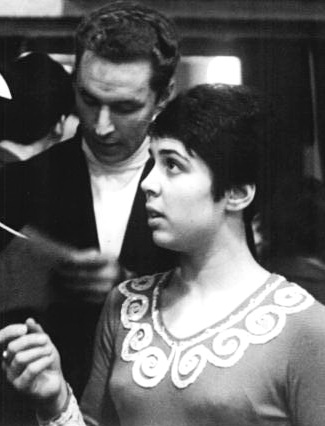
Rodnina with Ulanov in 1970

By 1963, Rodnina had begun skating with her first partner Oleg Vlasov, coached by Soňa and Miloslav Balun. In 1964, her coach became Stanislav Zhuk, who paired her with Alexei Ulanov. Rodnina/Ulanov won their first World title in 1969, ahead of Tamara Moskvina/Alexei Mishin. They won four consecutive World titles.

Rodnina and Ulanov won their next two World titles, 1970 and 1971, ahead of silver medalists Lyudmila Smirnova/Andrei Suraikin. However, Ulanov fell in love with Smirnova, and prior to the 1972 Olympics, the couple made the decision to skate together the following season. Rodnina/Ulanov went on to compete at the 1972 Olympics where they captured the gold. They then prepared for their last competition together, the 1972 World Championships. While practicing together a day before the start of the competition, the pair had an accident on a lift and Rodnina ended up in hospital with a concussion and an intracranial hematoma. Despite the accident, they had a strong showing in the short program, receiving some 6.0s. In the long program, Rodnina became faint and dizzy but it was enough for their fourth World title. Ulanov continued his career with Smirnova, while Rodnina considered retirement.

In April 1972, her coach Stanislav Zhuk suggested she team up with the young Leningrad skater Alexander Zaitsev, who had good jumping technique and quickly learned the elements. Their music stopped during their short program at the 1973 World Championships, possibly due to a Slovak worker acting in retaliation for the suppression of the Prague Spring. Known for intense concentration, they finished the program in silence, earning a standing ovation and a gold medal upon completion, ahead of Smirnova/Ulanov, whom they again defeated in 1974.

In 1974, Rodnina/Zaitsev left Zhuk, with whom the working relationship had become strained, to train with Tatiana Tarasova. They won six consecutive World titles together, as well as seven European gold medals, and won their first Olympic title together in 1976. Rodnina/Zaitsev did not compete during the 1978–79 season because she was pregnant with their son who was born on 23 February 1979. They returned in 1980 to capture their second Olympic title together and Rodnina's third. At the age of 30 years and 159 days, she became one of the oldest female figure skating Olympic champions. They then retired from competitive skating.

Throughout her career, Rodnina competed internationally for the Soviet Union and represented the Armed Forces sports society at the national level. Rodnina, along with Ulanov and her later partner Alexander Zaitsev "completely dominated international pair skating throughout the 1970s". With her partners, she won ten World Championships and three consecutive Olympic gold medals from 1971 to 1980, a record that equaled Sonia Henie's, along with eleven European titles, making her the most successful pair skater in history. She was one of the first female pair skaters to be known for her athleticism and ever-increasing dangerous tricks. She and her partners were also known for their acrobatic lifts, side-by-jumps, and for the split triple twist. In the early 1990s, she coached at the Ice Castle International Training Center in Lake Arrowhead, California.

=== Comments on doping ===
In a 1991 interview, Rodnina said she was aware that Soviet figure skaters had used doping substances since the early 1970's in preparation for the competitive season. According to Rodina "Boys in pairs and singles used drugs, but this was only in August or September. This was done just in training, and everyone was tested (in the Soviet Union) before competitions."

== Political career ==
Rodnina became a member of the Public Chamber of Russia in 2005. In the 2007 legislative election, she was elected to the State Duma as a member of President Vladimir Putin's United Russia party. On 17 December 2012, Rodnina supported the Dima Yakovlev Law, the law in the Russian Parliament banning adoption of Russian orphans by citizens of the United States.

Sanctions

Rodnina was sanctioned by the United Kingdom from 15 March 2022 in relation to Russia's actions in Ukraine.

In December 2022, the Ukrainian Parliament sanctioned Rodnina for her support of the 2022 Russian invasion of Ukraine. In 2023, she supported Poland's decision to boycott the Olympic Games in case Russian athletes are allowed to compete, saying that it would mean "Poland gets banned for the next two Olympic cycles".

== Personal life ==
Rodnina graduated from the Central Institute of Physical Culture. Her first marriage was to Alexander Zaitsev, with whom she has a son of the same name, born in 1979. From her second marriage with the film producer Leonid Menkovsky, Rodnina has a daughter, Alyona Minkovski, born in 1986. She is currently divorced. She spent a number of years living in the United States and then moved back to Russia.

=== Twitter controversy ===
On 13 September 2013, Rodnina caused a stir when she tweeted a doctored photo of U.S. President Barack Obama and his wife Michelle, with Obama's mouth full of food, with a photoshopped banana in the image's foreground. She said she was practicing her right to free expression, but critics claimed she was making a racist comment about the African-American president. On 10 February 2014, Rodnina in her Twitter claimed that her account was hacked at the time of posting the offensive photograph and apologized for her handling of the affair.

== Results ==
=== With Ulanov ===
Event	1967–68	1968–69	1969–70	1970–71	1971–72
Winter Olympics					1st
World Championships		1st	1st	1st	1st
European Championships	5th	1st	1st	1st	1st
Soviet Championships	3rd	3rd	1st	1st	
Prize of Moscow News	1st	2nd	1st		

=== With Zaitsev ===
Event	1972–73	1973–74	1974–75	1975–76	1976–77	1977–78	1978–79	1979–80
Winter Olympics				1st				1st
World Championships	1st	1st	1st	1st	1st	1st		
European Championships	1st	1st	1st	1st	1st	1st		1st
Soviet Championships	1st	1st	1st		1st			
Prize of Moscow News						1st		

== Other honours and awards ==
- Order of the Red Banner of Labour (1972)
- Order of Lenin (1976)

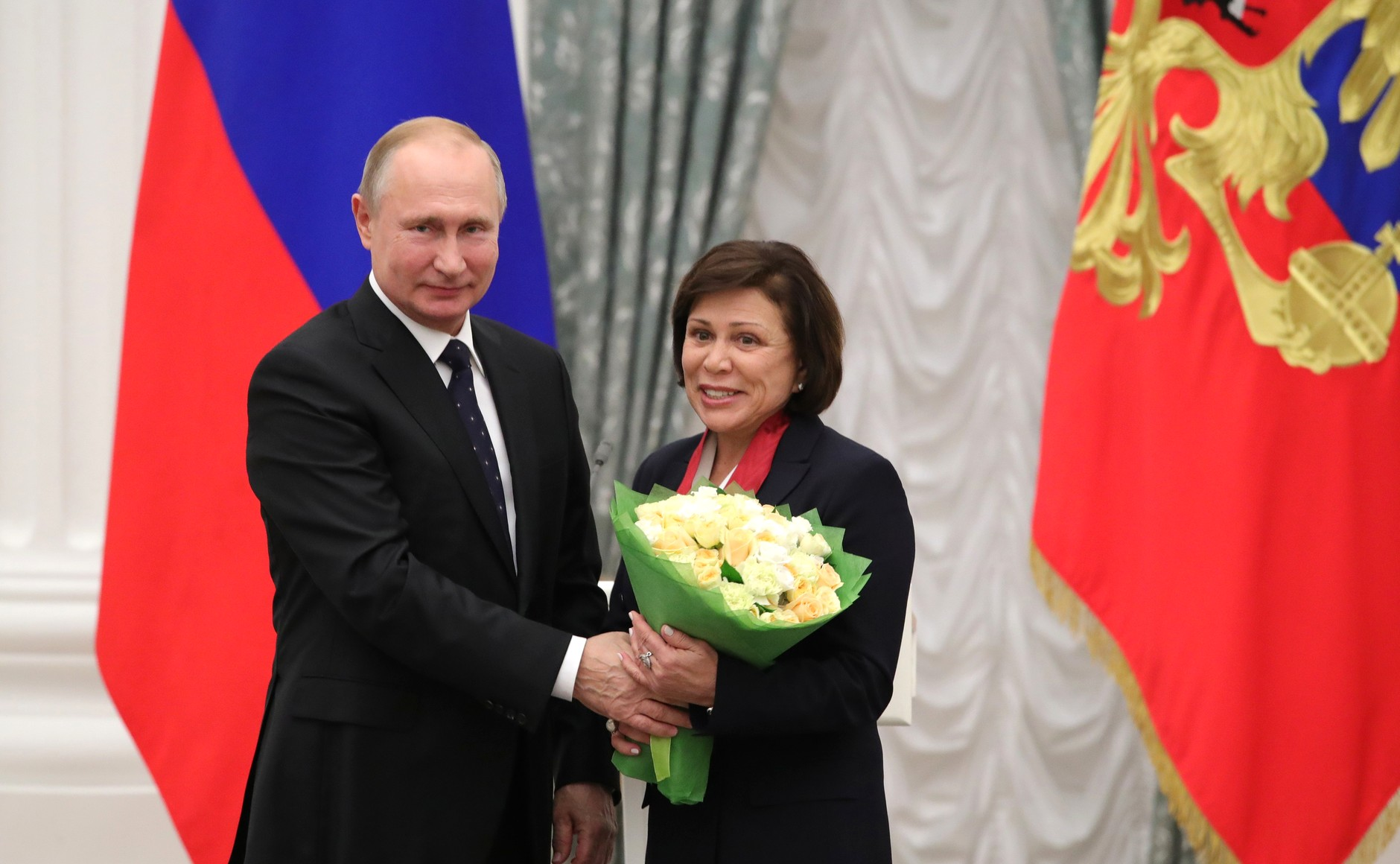
Presentation of the Order "For Merit to the Fatherland", 2nd class, 21 November 2019

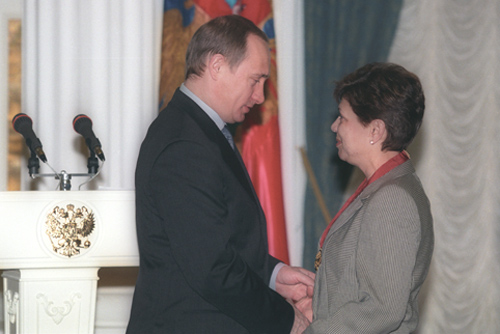
Presentation of the Order "For Merit to the Fatherland", 3rd class, 7 March 2000

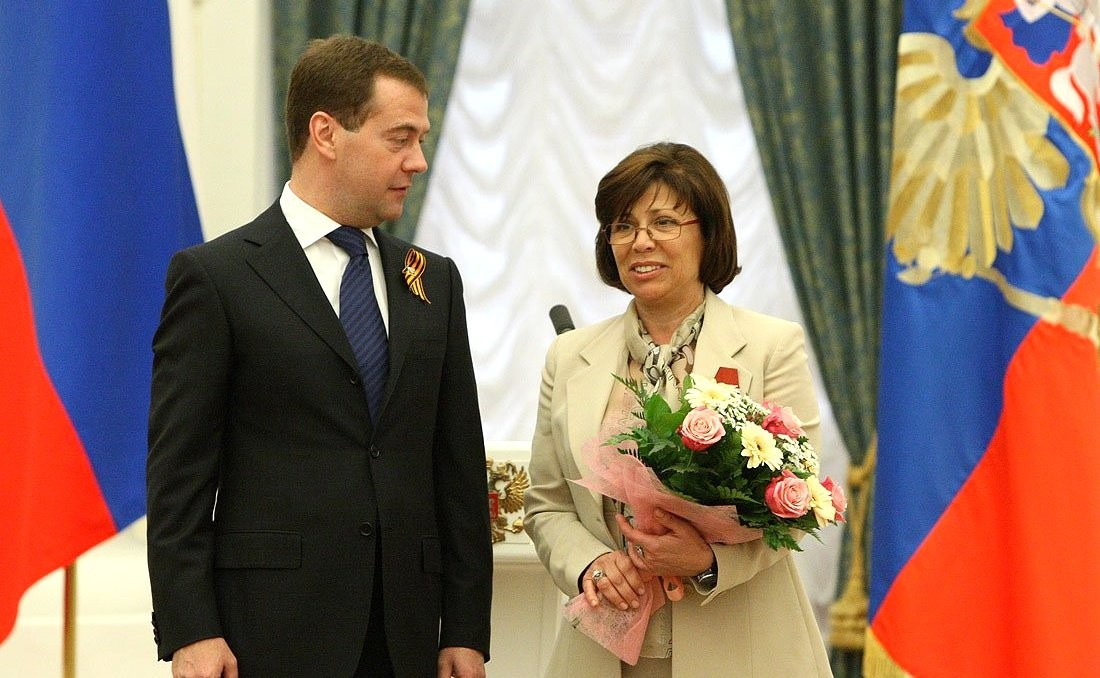
Presentation of the Order "For Merit to the Fatherland", 4th class, 6 May 2010

- Order "For Merit to the Fatherland", 2nd, 3rd and 4th classes
- Medal "In Commemoration of the 850th Anniversary of Moscow"
- International Skating Union's Jacques Favart Award, first recipient (1981)
- Inducted into International Women's Sports Hall of Fame (1988)
- Inducted into the World Figure Skating Hall of Fame (1989)
- In the 2014 Winter Olympics in Sochi, Russia, she was given the honor of being the lighter of the Olympic Cauldron along with Vladislav Tretiak

== Bibliography ==
- A. Chaikovsky (1977). Irina Rodnina. Heroes of the Olympic Games (in Russian). Moscow: Fizkultura i sport. Archived from the original on 1 January 2007.

Olympic Games
Preceded by Callum Airlie, Jordan Duckitt, Desiree Henry, Katie Kirk, Cameron MacRitchie, Aidan Reynolds, and Adelle Tracey	Final Olympic torchbearer Sochi 2014; With: Vladislav Tretiak	Succeeded by Vanderlei Cordeiro de Lima
Preceded by Catriona Le May Doan, Steve Nash, Nancy Greene and Wayne Gretzky	Final Winter Olympic torchbearer Sochi 2014; With: Vladislav Tretiak	Succeeded by Yuna Kim
