= Alan Spiegl =

Pair skater for Czechoslovakia

Personal information
- Born: 7 August 1959 (age 67) Opava, Czechoslovakia

Figure skating career
- Country: Czechoslovakia
- Partner: Ingrid Spieglová
- Coach: Ivan Rezek
- Retired: 1980

Alan Spiegl (born 7 August 1959) is a former pair skater for Czechoslovakia. With Ingrid Spieglová, he won six national titles and competed at the 1976 Winter Olympics.

== Personal life ==
Alan Spiegl was born on 7 August 1959 in Opava, Czechoslovakia. He is the elder brother of Ingrid Spieglová. In 1984, he graduated from Masaryk University in Brno, having studied at the Faculty of Education.

He and his wife, Vera, have two sons – Ondrej (Swedish figure skater, born in 1993) and Lukas. After living in Salzburg, Austria, and the Czech Republic, the family moved to Sweden in 2000. They have resided in Uppsala, Växjö, and Eskilstuna.

== Career ==
=== Competitive ===
In 1973, Spiegl and his sister, Ingrid Spieglová, moved from Opava to Brno, where they became students of Ivan Rezek. The siblings represented Czechoslovakia in pair skating and won six consecutive national titles, beginning in the 1974–75 season. Their ISU Championship debut came at the 1975 Europeans in Copenhagen, Denmark; the pair finished 12th at the event.

The following season, Spieglová/Spiegl ranked 12th at the 1976 European Championships in Geneva, Switzerland, and then 13th at the 1976 Winter Olympics in Innsbruck, Austria. Concluding their season, they placed 10th at the 1976 World Championships in Gothenburg, Sweden.

The siblings achieved their career-best world result, 6th, at the 1977 World Championships in Tokyo, Japan, and 1978 World Championships in Ottawa, Canada. Their highest continental result, 5th, came at the 1978 European Championships in Strasbourg, France.

Spieglová/Spiegl won silver at the 1977 Golden Spin of Zagreb, silver at the 1978 Prague Skate, bronze at the 1979 Ennia Challenge Cup, and silver at the 1979 Prague Skate. They were scheduled to compete at the 1980 Winter Olympics in Lake Placid, New York, but the Communists decided to give their spot to someone else. The siblings retired from competition at the end of the season.

=== Post-competitive ===
Spiegl and his sister skated with Holiday on Ice for seven years. As of 2016, he works as a skating coach at Eskilstuna IK in Sweden.

== Competitive highlights ==
Pair skating with Ingrid Spieglová

Event	73–74	74–75	75–76	76–77	77–78	78–79	79–80
Winter Olympics			13th				
World Championships			10th	6th	6th		8th
European Championships		12th	12th	6th	5th	6th	8th
Czechoslovak Championships	3rd	1st (Note: Ingrid Spieglová and Alan Spiegl were not awarded the title of Czechoslovak champions in 1975, because the minimum required number of entrants in the competition was not met.)	1st	1st	1st	1st	1st
Ennia Challenge						3rd	
Golden Spin of Zagreb					1st		
Prague Skate						2nd	2nd
