= Ingrid Spieglová =

Czech pair skater

Personal information
- Other names: Ingrid Holásková
- Born: 6 August 1960 (age 66) Opava, Czechoslovakia

Figure skating career
- Country: Czechoslovakia
- Discipline: Pair skating
- Partner: Alan Spiegl
- Retired: 1980

Medal record
Czechoslovak Championships
| Gold medal – first place | 1976 Prague | Pairs |
| Gold medal – first place | 1977 Žilina | Pairs |
| Gold medal – first place | 1978 Brno | Pairs |
| Gold medal – first place | 1979 Bratislava | Pairs |
| Gold medal – first place | 1980 Karviná | Pairs |
| Bronze medal – third place | 1974 Prague | Pairs |

Ingrid Spieglová (married Holásková; born 6 August 1960) is a Czech former pair skater who competed for Czechoslovakia. With her brother and partner Alan Spiegl, they won five Czechoslovak national titles and competed at the 1976 Winter Olympics.

== Personal life ==
Ingrid Spieglová was born on 6 August 1960 in Opava, Czechoslovakia. She is the sister of Alan Spiegl. In 1984, she graduated from Masaryk University in Brno, having studied at the Faculty of Education.

== Career ==
In 1973, Spieglová and her brother moved from Opava to Brno, where they became students of Ivan Rezek. The siblings represented Czechoslovakia in pair skating and won five consecutive national titles, beginning in 1976. Their ISU Championship debut came at the 1975 Europeans in Copenhagen, Denmark; the pair finished 12th at the event.

The following season, Spieglová/Spiegl ranked 12th at the 1976 European Championships in Geneva, Switzerland, and then 13th at the 1976 Winter Olympics in Innsbruck, Austria. Concluding their season, they placed 10th at the 1976 World Championships in Gothenburg, Sweden.

The siblings achieved their career-best world result, 6th, at the 1977 World Championships in Tokyo, Japan, and 1978 World Championships in Ottawa, Canada. Their highest continental result, 5th, came at the 1978 European Championships in Strasbourg, France.

Spieglová/Spiegl won gold at the 1977 Golden Spin of Zagreb, silver at the 1978 Prague Skate, bronze at the 1979 Ennia Challenge Cup, and silver at the 1979 Prague Skate. They were scheduled to compete at the 1980 Winter Olympics in Lake Placid, New York, but the Communists decided to give their spot to someone else. The siblings retired from competition at the end of the season. They skated with Holiday on Ice for seven years.

== Competitive highlights ==
Pair skating with Alan Spiegl

| Event | 73–74 | 74–75 | 75–76 | 76–77 | 77–78 | 78–79 | 79–80 |
|---|---|---|---|---|---|---|---|
| Winter Olympics | | | 13th | | | | |
| World Championships | | | 10th | 6th | 6th | | 8th |
| European Championships | | 12th | 12th | 6th | 5th | 6th | 8th |
| Czechoslovak Championships | 3rd | 1st (Note: Ingrid Spieglová and Alan Spiegl were not awarded the title of Czechoslovak champions in 1975, because the minimum required number of entrants in the competition was not met.) | 1st | 1st | 1st | 1st | 1st |
| Ennia Challenge | | | | | | 3rd | |
| Golden Spin of Zagreb | | | | | 1st | | |
| Prague Skate | | | | | | 2nd | 2nd |
