= Candace Jones =

Canadian pair skater

Candace Lynne "Candy" Jones (born March 20, 1955, in Kingston, Ontario) is a Canadian former pair skater. With her husband Don Fraser, she won gold medals at the Canadian Figure Skating Championships in 1975 and 1976, and competed in the 1976 Winter Olympics. They also won a number of World Championships as professionals. They were known as the first couple to do a one-handed overhead lift, as well as a no-hands death spiral that has yet to be attempted by other pairs.

== Ice-skating career ==
Jones has won gold medals in figures, free skating, dance and pairs in various competitions. She was originally a single skater, but when the pair skater Don Fraser split from his regular partner, he asked Jones to be his pair skating partner after seeing her in a skating ring.

The skating pair of Jones and Fraser made their debut at the Canadian Figure Skating Championships in 1974, reaching fourth place. That year, they also won silver medals at the Grand Prix de Patinage Artistique in France and the Nebelhorn Trophy in Germany.

In 1975, they won gold at the Canadian Figure Skating Championships. At the 1975 World Figure Skating Championships where they finished 11th, the performed for the first time a novel lifting move called the "One Hand Press".

The pair again won the Canadian Championships in 1976. They were placed 12th in the 1976 World Figure Skating Championships, and 14th in the 1976 Winter Olympics.

They invented a unique move, the no-hands death spiral, during which the man as the pivot releases his handhold on his partner while she continues to spiral on her own in a backbend position. Jones discovered this move when she was demonstrating to another pair how to do a pivot, the man slipped and lost his grip, and she realized that she could do the spiral on her own, after which they incorporated the move into their performances.

They won a number of medals competing as professionals, including gold medals in the World Professional Figure Skating Championships held in Jaca, Spain in 1977, 1978 and 1979, the International Professional Ice Skating Championships held at Madison Square Garden, New York in 1982, and the Professional Championships the following year.

Fraser and Jones were part of the Broadway production and 1978 television broadcast of Toller Cranston's The Ice Show.

== Personal life ==
After her career in ice skating ended, Jones studied medicine, graduating with a degree in medicine at McGill University in Montreal in 1985. She did a residency in family medicine at Queen's University in Kingston until 1987. She worked in Sharbot Lake until the early 1990s, when she moved to Colchester, Vermont in the United States where she practiced family medicine at the University of Vermont and the Fletcher Allen Health Centre.

Jones and Fraser have two children, Jesse and Mat. Jesse is a tattoo artist, while Mat is a former weightlifter and a multiple CrossFit Games champion.

== Results ==
(pairs with Don Fraser)

Event	1973–74	1974–75	1975–76
Winter Olympic Games			14th
World Championships		11th	12th
Canadian Championships	4th	1st	1st
Nebelhorn Trophy		2nd	
