= Ron Shaver =

Canadian figure skater

Personal information
- Full name: Ronald Shaver
- Born: June 16, 1951 (age 75) Galt, Ontario, Canada

Figure skating career
- Country: Canada
- Skating club: Hamilton SC; Hamilton-Stoney Creek

Ronald "Ron" Shaver (born June 16, 1951 in Galt, Ontario) is a Canadian former competitive figure skater. He is a two-time Skate Canada International champion and the 1977 Canadian national champion.

== Career ==
Shaver won the novice title at the 1966 Canadian Championships, the first year that level was contested at the national championships. After winning the senior silver medal at the 1973 Canadian Nationals, he was sent to Bratislava, Czechoslovakia to compete at his first World Championships; he finished eighth overall after placing 12th in figures, sixth in the short program, and fourth in the free skate.

Shaver's best World result came at the 1974 World Championships in Munich, West Germany. He ranked seventh in figures, second in the short, third in the free, and fifth overall. He pulled a groin muscle in the 1974–75 season. He finished eighth at the 1975 World Championships in Colorado Springs, Colorado.

Shaver represented Canada at the 1976 Winter Olympics in Innsbruck, Austria. He withdrew after placing sixth in figures and third in the short. In 1977, he became the Canadian national champion. Making his final amateur appearance, he placed sixth at the 1977 World Championships in Tokyo, Japan.

== Competitive highlights ==
International
Event	65–66	68–69	69–70	70–71	71–72	72–73	73–74	74–75	75–76	76–77
Olympics									WD	
Worlds						8th	5th	8th		6th
North American				5th						
Skate Canada							2nd	1st	2nd	1st
Moscow News							2nd			
St. Gervais				2nd						
National
Canadian Champ.	1st N	3rd J	3rd	4th	5th	2nd	2nd		2nd	1st
WD: Withdrew; Levels – N: Novice; J: Junior
