= Don Fraser (figure skater) =

Canadian pair skater

Donald Edward Fraser (born December 4, 1955, in Lloydminster, Saskatchewan) is a former Canadian pair skater. With his wife Candace Jones, he won the gold medal at the Canadian Figure Skating Championships in 1975 and 1976 and competed in the 1976 Winter Olympics. They have also won a number of World Championships as professionals. They were known as the first couple to do a one-handed overhead lift, as well as a no-hands death spiral that has yet to be attempted by other skating couples.

== Career ==
Fraser competed in junior pair skating events with Linda Watts. They finished fourth at the 1971 Canadian Figure Skating Championships, and won the junior pairs title in 1972. After splitting from his pairs partner Watts, he asked Candace Jones to be his partner after he saw her skate.

Fraser and Jones made their debut in the Canadian Figure Skating Championships in 1974, reaching fourth place that year. The same year, the pair also won silver medals at the Grand Prix de Patinage Artistique in France, and the Nebelhorn Trophy in Germany.

In 1975, they won Gold at the Canadian Figure Skating Championships. At the 1975 World Figure Skating Championships where they finished 11th, the performed for the first time a new move, the "One Hand Press".

They again won the Canadian Championships in 1976. They were placed 12th at the 1976 World Figure Skating Championships, and 14th at the 1976 Winter Olympics.

They have won a number of medals competing as professionals, including Gold medals at the World Professional Figure Skating Championships held in Jaca, Spain in 1977, 1978 and 1979. They also won the International Professional Ice Skating Championships held at Madison Square Garden, New York in 1982, which they also won the following year.

As professionals, they invented a unique move, the no-hand death spiral, during which the man acting as the pivot releases his handhold on the female partner while she continues to spiral on her own in a backbend position, the man then jumps over her while she was doing the spiral. Candy Jones discovered this move when she was demonstrating to another pair how to do a pivot; the boy slipped and lost his grip, and she realized that she could do the spiral on her own, after which Fraser and Jones incorporated it into their performances.

Fraser and Jones were part of the 1977 Broadway production and the 1978 television broadcast of Toller Cranston's The Ice Show.

== Personal life ==
He married Candace and they have two sons, Jesse and Mat. He coached for a time after his skating career finished. He had a woodworking and furniture business. He worked in real estate before giving up the job to stay at home after his wife qualified and worked as a doctor, first in Kingston, Ontario, before moving to Colchester, Vermont.

Don and Candace's son Mat Fraser is a former weightlifter and a five-times CrossFit Games champion.

== Results ==
pairs with Candace Jones

Event	1974-75	1975-76
Winter Olympic Games		14th
World Championships	11th	12th
Canadian Championships	1st	1st
Nebelhorn Trophy	2nd	

pairs with Linda Watts

Event	1971-72
Canadian Championships	1st J
