= Kim Alletson =

Canadian figure skater

Personal information
- Full name: Patricia Kim Alletson
- Born: June 30, 1958 (age 68) Brockville, Ontario, Canada

Figure skating career
- Country: Canada
- Discipline: Women's singles
- Skating club: Minto Skating Club
- Retired: 1978

Patricia Kim Alletson (born June 30, 1958 in Brockville, Ontario) is a Canadian former competitive figure skater. She is the 1977 Skate Canada International champion, the 1973 Grand Prix International St. Gervais bronze medallist, and a two-time (1975, 1976) Canadian national silver medallist. She represented Canada at the 1976 Winter Olympics.

== Career ==
Alletson won the junior women's title at the 1974 Canadian Championships.

At the 1975 Canadian Championships, Alletson landed a triple Salchow jump and won the silver medal. She was selected for the 1975 World Championships based on her placement; she said she had been so focused on doing well at the Canadian Championships that she hadn't though about competing at the World Championships. At the World Championships, she performed good doubles but fell on her triple Salchow attempt, and she finished 12th overall.

The next year, Alletson won a second silver medal at the Canadian Championships. She was selected for the 1976 Winter Olympics, where she placed 14th. She again placed 12th at the 1976 World Championships.

Alletson competed at the 1976 Skate Canada International. She placed second in the compulsory figures, then fell to third place after the short program, where she fell into the boards. In the free skate, she drew the last program of the night and performed well, which led her to rise to first to win the competition. At the Canadian Championships, she won the bronze medal and was not selected for the 1977 World Championships team.

In the 1977–1978 season, Alletson was bothered by inflamed tendons in her knee. Though doctors advised her to rest it, she continued skating because she wanted to compete at the 1978 Canadian Championships and did not have a bye to miss the divisional championships to qualify. She received a cortisone shot before the Canadian Championships, but at practice, her knee collapsed while attempting a triple Salchow. Unable to lift her leg, she was helped off the ice and taken to the hospital. Because of her injury, she withdrew from the competition. Later that year, it was announced she had retired due to her knee injury.

== Competitive highlights ==
International
Event	71–72	72–73	73–74	74–75	75–76	76–77
Olympics					14th	
Worlds				12th	12th	
Skate Canada						1st
St. Gervais			3rd	4th		
Nebelhorn Trophy				6th		
National
Canadian Champ.	2nd N	2nd J	1st J	2nd	2nd	3rd
Levels: N. = Novice; J. = Junior
