= Glyn Watts =

British ice dancer

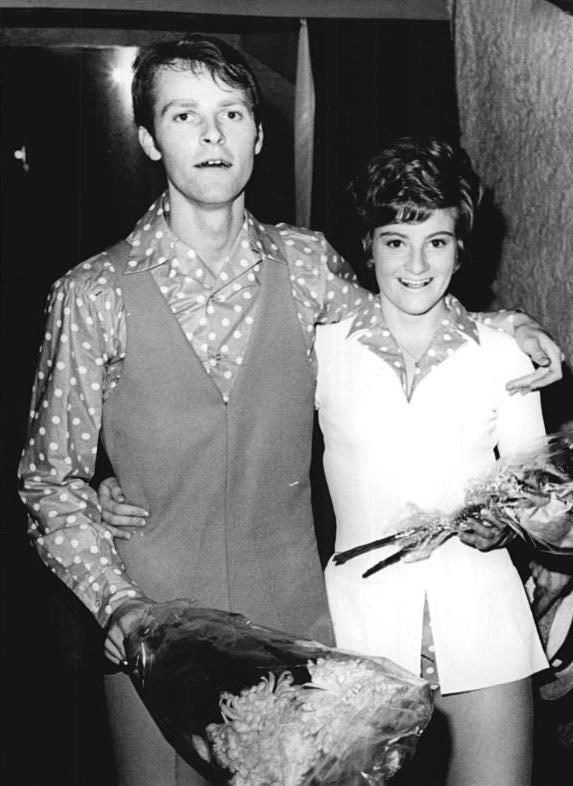
- Watts with Green in 1969

Personal information
- Full name: Glyn Robin Watts
- Born: 16 March 1949 (age 77) Herne, Kent, England

Figure skating career
- Country: United Kingdom
- Skating club: Streatham Ice Figure Skating Club
- Retired: 1976
Medal record
Figure skating: Ice dancing
Representing United Kingdom
World Championships
Bronze medal – third place	1975 Colorado Springs	Ice dancing
Silver medal – second place	1974 Munich	Ice dancing
Bronze medal – third place	1973 Bratislava	Ice dancing
European Championships
Silver medal – second place	1975 Copenhagen	Ice dancing
Silver medal – second place	1974 Zagreb	Ice dancing
Bronze medal – third place	1973 Cologne	Ice dancing

Glyn Robin Watts (born 16 March 1949) is a British former competitive ice dancer. With his skating partner, Hilary Green, he became the 1974 World silver medalist and a two-time European silver medalist (1974, 1975). They represented Great Britain at the 1976 Winter Olympics, where they placed 7th.

In 1973, they competed at the inaugural Skate Canada International and won the event.

== Competitive highlights ==
(with Green)

International
Event	69–70	70–71	71–72	72–73	73–74	74–75	75–76
Winter Olympics							7th
World Champ.		7th	6th	3rd	2nd	3rd	
European Champ.	7th	7th	4th	3rd	2nd	2nd	5th
Skate Canada					1st		
National
British Champ.				3rd	2nd	2nd	1st
