= Jean Yun =

South Korean figure skater

Personal information
- Born: Yun Hyo Jean; March 6, 1958 (age 68) Seoul, South Korea
- Height: 1.55 m (5 ft 1 in)

Figure skating career
- Country: South Korea
- Coach: John Nicks
- Began skating: 1964
- Retired: 1980

- Jean Yun
- Hangul: 윤효진
- Hanja: 尹孝珍
- RR: Yun Hyojin
- MR: Yun Hyojin

Jean Yun (Korean: 윤효진; Hanja: 尹孝珍; born March 6, 1958), also Yun Hyo Jean, is a retired competitive figure skater who represented South Korea in the 1976 Winter Olympics as well as the 1975 and 1976 World Figure Skating Championships. Yun was the 1975 and 1976 South Korea National Champion, two-times World Team Member, and a double gold medalist in the U.S. and a double gold medalist in South Korea. From 1969 to 1980, she competed and reached the podium seven times in the ladies' singles at South Korean Figure Skating Championships.

Yun was born in Seoul, South Korea. She is a double Master rated Professional Skaters Association coach in Freestyle & Figure who coaches at East West Ice Palace at Artesia, California and Pickwick Ice Center at Burbank, California.

== Career ==
Her students have included:

- Yeon Jun Park

== Competitive highlights ==
International
Event	1969	1970	1971	1972	1973	1974	1975	1976	1977	1978	1979	1980
Winter Olympics								17th				
World Championships							22nd	19th				
Grand Prix International St. Gervais						F.						
National
South Korean Figure Skating Championships	2nd		3rd			2nd	1st	1st	2nd			3rd
Levels: N. = Novice; J. = Junior; F.= Finalist
