= James Millns =

American ice dancer

Personal information
- Full name: James G. Millns Jr.
- Other names: Jim Millns
- Born: January 13, 1949 (age 77) Toledo, Ohio

Figure skating career
- Country: United States
- Partner: Colleen O'Connor
- Skating club: Broadmoor SC
- Retired: 1976
Medal record
Figure skating – Ice dancing
Representing the United States
Olympic Games
Bronze medal – third place	1976 Innsbruck	Ice dancing
World Championships
Bronze medal – third place	1976 Gothenburg	Ice dancing
Silver medal – second place	1975 Colorado Springs	Ice dancing

James G. "Jim" Millns Jr. (born January 13, 1949) is an American former competitive ice dancer. With partner Colleen O'Connor, he was the 1974–1976 U.S. national champion, the 1975 World silver medalist, the 1976 World bronze medalist, and the 1976 Olympic bronze medalist.

They were inducted into the United States Figure Skating Hall of Fame in 1993.

== Competitive highlights ==
(with O'Connor)

Event	1971–72	1972–73	1973–74	1974–75	1975–76
Winter Olympic Games					3rd
World Championships			7th	2nd	3rd
U.S. Championships	7th	4th	1st	1st	1st
Skate Canada International				2nd	

== See also ==
- World Fit
