= Matilde Ciccia =

Italian ice dancer (born 1952)

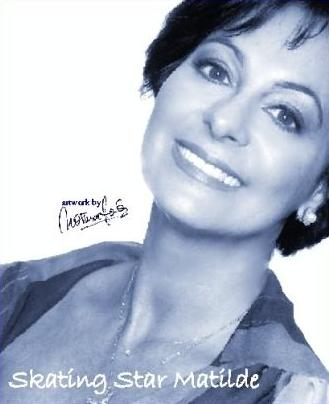

Personal information
- Born: 6 October 1952 (age 73) Monasterace, Italy

Figure skating career
- Country: Italy
- Partner: Lamberto Ceserani

Matilde Ciccia (born 6 October 1952 in Monasterace) is an Italian former ice dancer. Competing with Lamberto Ceserani, she won the gold medal at the Italian Figure Skating Championships several times. They finished fifth at the 1975 World Championships and sixth at the 1976 Winter Olympics.

Ciccia had a role in the 1980 movie Zappatore.

== Results ==
(with Ceserani)

International
Event	69–70	70–71	71–72	72–73	73–74	74–75	75–76
Winter Olympics							6th
World Champ.		16th		11th	8th	5th	
European Champ.	11th	12th	12th	8th	6th	5th	6th
Skate Canada							3rd
National
Italian Champ.	1st	1st	1st	1st	1st	1st	1st
