= Andrei Minenkov and Irina Moiseeva =

Russian ice dancers

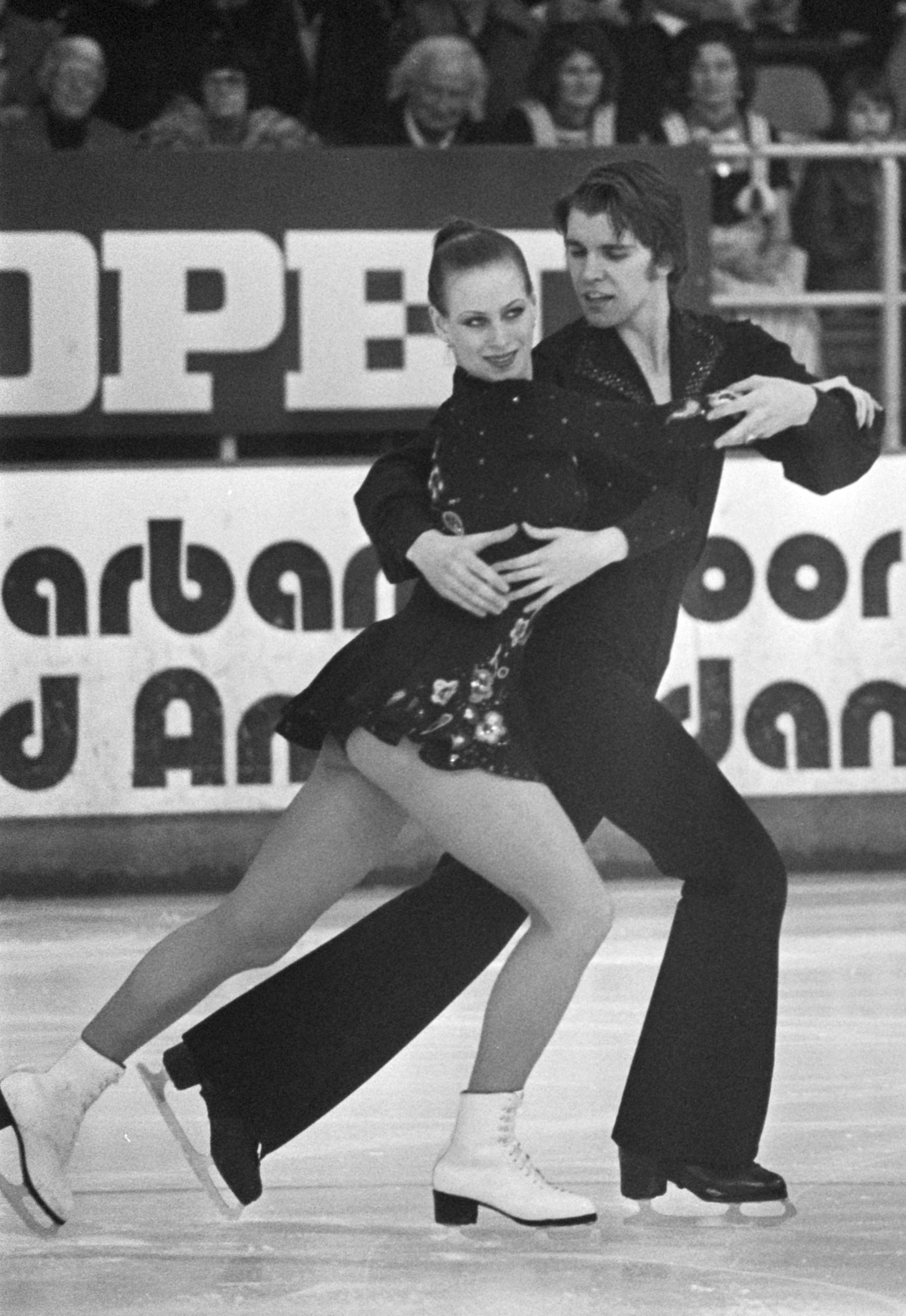
- Minenkov and Moiseeva in 1976

Personal information
- Full name: Andrei Olegovich Minenkov
- Other names: Andrey Minenkov
- Born: Moscow, Russian SFSR, Soviet Union
- Height: 1.83 m (6 ft 0 in)

Figure skating career
- Partner: Irina Moiseeva
- Skating club: VSS Trud (Moscow)
- Retired: 1983
Medal record
Figure skating
Ice dancing
Representing Soviet Union
Olympic Games
Bronze medal – third place	1980 Lake Placid	Ice dancing
Silver medal – second place	1976 Innsbruck	Ice dancing
World Championships
Bronze medal – third place	1982 Copenhagen	Ice dancing
Silver medal – second place	1981 Hartford	Ice dancing
Bronze medal – third place	1980 Dortmund	Ice dancing
Bronze medal – third place	1979 Vienna	Ice dancing
Silver medal – second place	1978 Ottawa	Ice dancing
Gold medal – first place	1977 Tokyo	Ice dancing
Silver medal – second place	1976 Gothenburg	Ice dancing
Gold medal – first place	1975 Colorado Springs	Ice dancing
European Championships
Bronze medal – third place	1982 Lyon	Ice dancing
Silver medal – second place	1981 Innsbruck	Ice dancing
Bronze medal – third place	1980 Gothenburg	Ice dancing
Silver medal – second place	1979 Zagreb	Ice dancing
Gold medal – first place	1978 Strasbourg	Ice dancing
Gold medal – first place	1977 Helsinki	Ice dancing
Silver medal – second place	1976 Geneva	Ice dancing

Andrei Olegovich Minenkov (Russian: Андрей Олегович Миненков; born 6 December 1954 in Moscow) and Irina Valentinovna Moiseeva (Russian: Ирина Валентиновна Моисеева; born 3 July 1955 in Moscow) are Russian retired ice dancers who represented the Soviet Union. They were the 1976 Olympic silver medalist, 1980 Olympic bronze medalist, and two-time world champions (1975 and 1977).

== Career ==
Irina Moiseeva and Andrei Minenkov met at the rink when they were six years old and began skating together in 1967. They had their breakthrough during the 1974–1975 season. They were third at the Soviet Championships, behind Lyudmila Pakhomova/Aleksandr Gorshkov and Natalia Linichuk/Gennadi Karponosov, and placed just off the podium at the 1975 European Championships. However, they then went on to capture their first World title at the World Championships, in the absence of Pakhomova/Gorshkov but moving ahead of a few teams ranked higher than them earlier in the season, including Linichuk/Karpanosov.

The next season, Moiseeva and Minenkov were again ranked behind Linichuk/Karponosov at the Soviet Championships, but edged past them in international competition to be second only to Pakhomova/Gorshkov. They won a silver medal at the 1976 Olympics, the first Games to include ice dancing. They also won silver at the World and European Championships.

The 1976–1977 season was the most successful for Moiseeva and Minenkov. They won World, European and national titles. Their dominance began to wane over the following years, although they won a total of eight consecutive World medals and seven European medals (including another gold in 1978). They also won the bronze at the 1980 Olympics.

The couple trained at VSS Trud in Moscow. They were coached by Tatiana Tarasova, Lyudmila Pakhomova, and Natalia Dubova. Tarasova coached them for ten years, beginning in 1969. They retired in 1983 because Moiseeva was expecting their daughter.

Olympic champions Torvill and Dean considered them one of their greatest influences.

== Personal life ==
Moiseeva and Minenkov married in 1977 and had a daughter in 1983. In 1989, Minenkov graduated from the Moscow State Institute of Radiotechnics, Electronics and Automation and founded a company, Kholod, in 1993.

== Results ==
(with Moiseeva)

International
Event	1969–70	1970–71	1971–72	1972–73	1973–74	1974–75	1975–76	1976–77	1977–78	1978–79	1979–80	1980–81	1981–82
Olympics							2nd				3rd		
Worlds				7th	4th	1st	2nd	1st	2nd	3rd	3rd	2nd	3rd
Europeans				7th	5th	4th	2nd	1st	1st	2nd	3rd	2nd	3rd
Skate Canada					3rd	1st							
NHK Trophy											1st		
Moscow News		6th		2nd	2nd	2nd		1st		1st			2nd
National
Soviet Champ.	5th	4th	3rd	3rd	2nd	3rd	2nd	1st		2nd		2nd	2nd
