= Teresa Weyna =

Polish ice dancer

Personal information
- Full name: Teresa Urszula Weyna
- Other names: Teresa Weyna-Urban
- Born: 30 May 1950 (age 76) Toruń, Poland
- Height: 1.63 m (5 ft 4 in)

Figure skating career
- Country: Poland
- Retired: 1976

Teresa Urszula Weyna (born 30 May 1950) is a Polish former ice dancer. Skating with Piotr Bojańczyk, she became a nine-time Polish national champion (1968–76) and placed in the top ten at six European Championships, three World Championships, and the 1976 Winter Olympics.

== Personal life ==
Weyna was born 30 May 1950 in Toruń, one of five daughters of Urszula Jadwiga Falkowska and Alfred Kazimierz Weyna. Her sisters were also figure skaters and her mother officiated at domestic skating events.

Known as Weyna-Urban while married to her ex-husband, she gave birth to twin daughters, Katarzyna and Karolina, in 1979 and a son, Bartosz, in 1980.

== Career ==
Weyna teamed up with Piotr Bojańczyk in autumn 1965. In the 1967–68 season, the duo won the Polish Championships for the first time and were given their ISU Championship debut at the 1968 European Championships. They finished 16th at the event in Västerås, Sweden.

In the 1974–75 season, Weyna/Bojańczyk won the bronze medal at the 1974 Prize of Moscow News and achieved their career-best World placement, seventh, at the 1975 World Championships in Colorado Springs, Colorado.

The following season, Weyna/Bojańczyk won their ninth consecutive national title. Their highest European result, seventh, came at the 1976 European Championships in Geneva, Switzerland. The duo placed ninth in Innsbruck, Austria at the 1976 Winter Olympics. They retired from competition after the 1976 World Championships.

Weyna represented several skating clubs during her competitive career — Pomorzanin Toruń (1960–71), Warszawianka (1972), Ogniwo Warszawa (1973–75), and Marymont Warszawa (1976), coached by Jan Bojańczyk in Toruń and Anna Bursche-Lindner in Warsaw. After retiring from competition, she became a skating coach. As of 2013, she coaches synchro skaters in Gdańsk.

== Competitive highlights ==
(with Bojańczyk)

International
Event	1967–68	1968–69	1969–70	1970–71	1971–72	1972–73	1973–74	1974–75	1975–76
Olympics									9th
World Champ.			13th	14th	13th		10th	7th	9th
European Champ.	16th	15th	9th	9th	9th	12th	9th	8th	7th
Moscow News							6th	3rd	
National
Polish Champ.	1st	1st	1st	1st	1st	1st	1st	1st	1st
