= Piotr Bojańczyk =

Polish ice dancer

Personal information
- Full name: Piotr Paweł Bojańczyk
- Born: 29 June 1946 (age 80) Toruń, Poland
- Height: 1.72 m (5 ft 7 1/2 in)

Figure skating career
- Country: Poland
- Retired: 1976

Piotr Paweł Bojańczyk (born 29 June 1946) is a Polish former ice dancer. Skating with Teresa Weyna, he became a nine-time Polish national champion (1968–76) and placed in the top ten at six European Championships, three World Championships, and the 1976 Winter Olympics.

== Personal life ==
Bojańczyk was born 29 June 1946 in Toruń to Janina (née Chudzik) and Jan Bojańczyk, a skating coach. He graduated with a Magister degree in physics from Nicolaus Copernicus University in Toruń and then studied at the Warsaw University of Technology.

With his wife Ewa, he has three children — Przemysław, Dominika, and Anna — and moved to Canada in 1989.

== Career ==
Bojańczyk skated with Grażyna Pasternak from 1963 to 1965 before teaming up with Teresa Weyna in autumn 1965. In the 1967–68 season, the duo won the Polish Championships for the first time and were given their ISU Championship debut at the 1968 European Championships. They finished 16th at the event in Västerås, Sweden.

In the 1974–75 season, Weyna/Bojańczyk won the bronze medal at the 1974 Prize of Moscow News and achieved their career-best World placement, seventh, at the 1975 World Championships in Colorado Springs, Colorado.

The following season, Weyna/Bojańczyk won their ninth consecutive national title. Their highest European result, seventh, came at the 1976 European Championships in Geneva, Switzerland. The duo placed ninth in Innsbruck, Austria at the 1976 Winter Olympics. They retired from competition after the 1976 World Championships.

Bojańczyk represented several skating clubs during his competitive career — Pomorzanin Toruń (until 1971), Warszawianka (1972), Ogniwo Warszawa (1973–75), and Marymont Warszawa (1976), coached by Jan Bojańczyk in Toruń and Anna Bursche-Lindner in Warsaw.

== Competitive highlights ==
(with Weyna)

International
Event	1967–68	1968–69	1969–70	1970–71	1971–72	1972–73	1973–74	1974–75	1975–76
Olympics									9th
World Champ.			13th	14th	13th		10th	7th	9th
European Champ.	16th	15th	9th	9th	9th	12th	9th	8th	7th
Moscow News							6th	3rd	
National
Polish Champ.	1st	1st	1st	1st	1st	1st	1st	1st	1st
