= Lamberto Ceserani =

Italian ice dancer (1953–2025)

Lamberto Ceserani (29 June 1953 – 15 February 2025) was an Italian ice dancer. Competing with Matilde Ciccia, he won the gold medal at the Italian Figure Skating Championships several times. They finished fifth at the 1975 World Championships and sixth at the 1976 Winter Olympics.

== Results ==
International
Event	69–70	70–71	71–72	72–73	73–74	74–75	75–76
Winter Olympics							6th
World Champ.		16th		11th	8th	5th	
European Champ.	11th	12th	12th	8th	6th	5th	6th
Skate Canada							3rd
National
Italian Champ.	1st	1st	1st	1st	1st	1st	1st
