= Gail Keddie =

British figure skater

Personal information
- Born: 1955 (age 70–71)

Figure skating career
- Country: United Kingdom
- Retired: 1975

Gail Keddie (born around 1955) is a British former competitive figure skater from Paisley, Scotland. She is the 1975 British national champion. Keddie competed at two World and two European Championships. Her best result was 14th at the 1974 World Championships in Munich.

== Competitive highlights ==
International
Event	1973–74	1974–75
World Championships	14th	20th
European Championships	15th	19th
National
British Championships		1st
