= Gerti Schanderl =

German figure skater

Personal information
- Born: 12 October 1956 (age 69) Munich
- Height: 1.70 m (5 ft 7 in)

Figure skating career
- Country: West Germany
- Coach: Rosemarie Brüning; Manfred Schnelldorfer
- Skating club: EC München
- Retired: 1977

Gerti Schanderl (born 12 October 1956) is a German former figure skater who represented West Germany. She is the 1973 Prize of Moscow News champion, the 1973 Nebelhorn Trophy bronze medalist, and a four-time German national champion.

Schanderl was born in Munich, the daughter of a production line seamstress and a federal railway locksmith. She achieved her highest ISU Championship placement, fourth at the 1974 Europeans in Zagreb and the 1974 Worlds in Munich. A member of EC München, she was coached by Rosemarie Brüning before joining Manfred Schnelldorfer in March 1976.

== Competitive highlights ==
International
Event	71–72	72–73	73–74	74–75	75–76	76–77
World Champ.	13th	13th	4th	14th		
European Champ.	13th	5th	4th	11th	9th	
Nebelhorn Trophy			3rd			
Prague Skate		2nd				
Prize of Moscow News			1st			
National
German Champ.	1st	1st	1st	2nd	1st	2nd
