= Geoffrey Yates =

British figure skater

Personal information
- Nationality: British
- Born: 16 May 1918
- Died: 14 December 2007 (aged 89)

Sport
- Sport: Figure skating

Geoffrey Yates (16 May 1918 – 14 December 2007) was a British figure skater. He competed in the men's singles event at the 1936 Winter Olympics.

Yates served in the Royal Marines during the Second World War.
