= Glyn Jones (figure skater) =

British figure skater

Personal information
- Born: 22 August 1953 (age 73)

Figure skating career
- Country: Great Britain
- Retired: c. 1977

Glyn Jones (born 22 August 1953) is a British former competitive figure skater. He represented Great Britain at the 1976 Winter Olympics in Innsbruck, Austria. He placed 19th in the compulsory figures, 17th in the short program, 16th in the free skate, and 16th overall. He appeared at six ISU Championships, achieving his best result, 13th, at the 1977 Europeans in Helsinki, Finland. Now he is married to Judy Jones and has one daughter and three stepchildren who he treats like his own. As of may 2026 he now has 5 step grandchildren who he loves very much.

As of August 2011, he was working as a manager at the Tampa Bay Skating Academy in Oldsmar, Florida.

== Competitive highlights ==
International
Event	1973–74	1974–75	1975–76	1976–77
Winter Olympics			16th	
World Champ.	21st		18th	
European Champ.	16th	17th	14th	13th
