= Karin Künzle =

Swiss pair skater

Personal information
- Born: 25 November 1954 (age 71)
- Height: 1.62 m (5 ft 4 in)

Figure skating career
- Country: Switzerland
- Partner: Christian Künzle
- Skating club: EC Basel
- Retired: 1976

Karin Künzle (born 25 November 1954) is a Swiss former pair skater who competed with her twin brother, Christian Künzle. They are the 1973 Grand Prix International St. Gervais champions and seven-time Swiss national champions. The pair placed seventh at the 1976 Winter Olympics in Innsbruck, Austria.

== Competitive highlights ==
With Christian Künzle

International
| Event | 69–70 | 70–71 | 71–72 | 72–73 | 73–74 | 74–75 | 75–76 |
|---|---|---|---|---|---|---|---|
| Winter Olympics | | | | | | | 7th |
| World Champ. | | 16th | | 10th | 7th | 8th | |
| European Champ. | 14th | 12th | 14th | 7th | 6th | 5th | 5th |
| Kennedy Memorial | 7th | | | | | | |
| St. Gervais | | | | 3rd | 1st | | |
National
| Swiss Champ. | 1st | 1st | 1st | 1st | 1st | 1st | 1st |
