= László Vajda (figure skater) =

Hungarian figure skater

Personal information
- Born: 16 May 1954 (age 72) Budapest, Hungary

Figure skating career
- Country: Hungary
- Skating club: BSE, Budapest

László Vajda (born 16 May 1954) is a Hungarian former figure skater. He is a ten-time Hungarian national champion. He placed in the top ten at five European Championships and at the 1975 World Championships. His best ISU Championship result, fifth, came at the 1975 Europeans in Copenhagen, Denmark.

Vajda served as Hungary's flag bearer at the 1976 Winter Olympics in Innsbruck, Austria. He placed tenth in the compulsory figures before withdrawing from the competition.

Vajda has worked as a skating coach. One of his students was Zsolt Kerekes.

14 times Jump Rope World Champion Vivien Vajda is the daughter of László Vajda.

== Competitive highlights ==
International
Event	1970	1971	1972	1973	1974	1975	1976	1977	1978	1979
Olympics							WD			
Worlds	16th			13th	11th	9th				
Europeans	17th	15th	14th	7th	6th	5th	8th			10th
National
Hungarian	1st	1st	1st	1st	1st	1st	1st	1st	1st	1st
WD: Withdrew
