= Christian Künzle =

Swiss pair skater

Personal information
- Born: 25 November 1954 (age 71)
- Height: 1.80 m (5 ft 11 in)

Figure skating career
- Country: Switzerland
- Partner: Karin Künzle
- Skating club: EC Basel
- Retired: 1976

Christian Künzle (born 25 November 1954) is a Swiss former pair skater who competed with his twin sister, Karin Künzle. They are the 1973 Grand Prix International St. Gervais champions and seven-time Swiss national champions. The pair placed seventh at the 1976 Winter Olympics in Innsbruck, Austria.

== Competitive highlights ==
With Karin Künzle

International
Event	69–70	70–71	71–72	72–73	73–74	74–75	75–76
Winter Olympics							7th
World Champ.		16th		10th	7th	8th	
European Champ.	14th	12th	14th	7th	6th	5th	5th
Kennedy Memorial	7th						
St. Gervais				3rd	1st		
National
Swiss Champ.	1st	1st	1st	1st	1st	1st	1st
