= Isabel de Navarre =

German figure skater

Personal information
- Full name: Isabel Duval de Navarre
- Born: 25 June 1956 (age 70) Bad Tölz, Bavaria, West Germany
- Height: 1.60 m (5 ft 3 in)

Figure skating career
- Country: West Germany
- Coach: Erich Zeller, Trude Bacherer
- Skating club: Sportclub Riessersee; Eisclub Bad Tölz
- Began skating: c. 1959
- Retired: 1976

Isabel Duval de Navarre (born 25 June 1956) is a German figure skating coach, ISU technical specialist, and former competitor for West Germany. She is the 1975 German national champion and placed fifth at the 1976 Winter Olympics.

== Personal life ==
Isabel de Navarre was born on 25 June 1956 in Bad Tölz, Bavaria. She is eight years younger than her sister, Yvonne.

== Career ==
Isabel de Navarre started to skate at the age of three at an ice rink in Bad Tölz which did not have a roof at the time. She wanted to compete with her sister, Yvonne, who placed seventh at the 1969 German Championships. She was also strongly inspired by figure skaters like Mona and Peter Szabo (Switzerland), Günter Anderl (Austria), Manfred Schnelldorfer, Gudrun Hauss and Walter Häffner (all West Germany) at the summer training camp in Bad Tölz.

De Navarre trained at Eisclub Bad Tölz under Trude Bacherer from Vienna. In 1970–71, she took her coach's advice to move to Garmisch-Partenkirchen and train with Erich Zeller, who coached her to the end of her amateur career. She finished 14th at the 1972 Winter Olympics in Sapporo, Japan.

From 1972, de Navarre represented Sportclub Riessersee. She won the 1975 German national ladies' title and finished fifth at the 1976 Winter Olympics in Innsbruck, Austria. She ranked first in the compulsory figures, 11th in the short program, and 12th in the free skate.

De Navarre is an International Skating Union technical specialist. She is a Diplom-qualified figure skating coach.

== Results ==
International
Event	71–72	72–73	73–74	74–75	75–76
Winter Olympics	14th				5th
World Champ.				6th	6th
European Champ.	11th		8th	5th	4th
Schäfer Memorial					2nd
Prize of Moscow News		2nd			
Richmond Trophy				2nd	
National
German Champ.	2nd	2nd	2nd	1st	2nd
