= Janet Thompson (figure skater) =

English ice dancer

Personal information
- Full name: Janet A. Thompson
- Born: 15 March 1956 (age 70) Ealing, London, England

Figure skating career
- Country: United Kingdom
- Retired: 1979
Medal record
Figure skating: Ice dancing
Representing United Kingdom
World Championships
Silver medal – second place	1977 Tokyo	Ice dancing

Janet A. Thompson (born 15 March 1956 in Ealing, London) is an English retired competitive ice dancer. Her partner was Warren Maxwell. They are the 1977 World silver medalists. They represented Great Britain at the 1976 Winter Olympics, where they placed 8th.

== Competitive highlights ==
Event	1974	1975	1976	1977	1978	1979
Winter Olympic Games			8th			
World Championships	11th	8th	6th	2nd	4th	5th
European Championships	8th	7th	8th	4th	4th	
British Championships		2nd	3rd	1st	1st	
