= Maria Zuchowicz =

Polish figure skating official (1930–2020)

- Born: 1930; Poznań, Poland
- Died: 24 November 2020 (aged 89–90); Warsaw, Poland
- Other name: Maria Bialous-Zuchowicz
- Occupations: Lawyer, ice skating official and judge, television commentator

Maria Zuchowicz (born in Poznań, 2 February 1930 – 24 November 2020) was a Polish lawyer and figure skating official. She was Chairperson of Appeal Commission of the International Skating Union and Vice-President of the Polish Figure Skating Associations. She was also international skating judge including as a judge and referee of the Olympic Games in Grenoble, Innsbruck, Sapporo and Calgary.

A member of the CAS ad hoc division at the Winter Olympic Games at Nagano in 1998, Zuchowicz was also president and arbitrator of the Court of Sport of the Polish Olympic Committee and arbitrator of the Football amicable Court of the Polish Football Union.

She commented on figure skating events for the Polish national television (TVP) and was a judge in the first (autumn 2007) and second (spring 2008) Polish edition of the Dancing on Ice. She was honored with the Officer's Cross of the Order of Polonia Restituta in 2015, and she died in 2020, at age 90.
