= Jiří Pokorný (figure skater) =

Personal information
- Born: 27 November 1953 (age 72) Prague, Czechoslovakia
- Height: 1.77 m (5 ft 9 1/2 in)

Figure skating career
- Country: Czechoslovakia

Jiří Pokorný (born 27 November 1953) is a former ice dancer who represented Czechoslovakia. Together with Eva Peštová he competed at the 1976 Winter Olympics and finished in 11th place. Their best ISU Championship placement was eighth at the 1976 World Championships.

== Competitive highlights ==
=== With Peštová ===
International
Event	1973–74	1974–75	1975–76
Winter Olympics			11th
World Championships	17th	10th	8th
European Championships	14th	10th	9th
Prize of Moscow News		7th	
National
Czechoslovak Champ.	2nd	1st	1st

=== With Holá ===
National
Event	1977–78
Czechoslovak Championships	2nd
