= Grażyna Dudek =

Polish figure skater

Personal information
- Born: 20 August 1960 (age 65) Katowice, Poland
- Height: 1.59 m (5 ft 2 1/2 in)

Figure skating career
- Country: Poland
- Retired: c. 1978

Grażyna Dudek (born 20 August 1960 in Katowice) is a Polish former competitive figure skater. She competed at the 1976 Winter Olympics, three World Championships, and four European Championships. She is a five-time (1974–1978) Polish national champion.

== Competitive highlights ==
International
Event	72–73	73–74	74–75	75–76	76–77	77–78
Winter Olympics				18th		
World Championships	23rd	22nd		14th		
European Championships		24th	16th	11th	15th	
Prague Skate			8th	3rd		
National
Polish Championships		1st	1st	1st	1st	1st
