= Judi Genovesi =

American ice dancer

Personal information
- Full name: Judi Ann Genovesi
- Other names: Judith Genovesi Whaling, Judi Genovesi Whaling
- Born: June 21, 1957 (age 69) Manchester, Connecticut, U.S.
- Height: 5 ft 4 in (1.63 m)

Figure skating career
- Country: United States
- Partner: Kent Weigle
- Skating club: SC of Hartford job=Treasurer, Oil & Gas Company

Judi Ann Genovesi (married name: Adler 1984 to 2012; Whaling 2014 to present; born June 21, 1957, in Manchester, Connecticut) is an American ice dancer. With partner Kent Weigle, she is the 1977 U.S. national champion. They represented the United States at the 1976 Winter Olympics where they placed 15th.

== Competitive highlights ==
(with Weigle)

Event	1973–74	1974–75	1975–76	1976–77
Winter Olympic Games			15th	
World Championships		12th	13th	9th
U.S. Championships	5th	2nd	2nd	1st
Nebelhorn Trophy		1st		
