= Karena Richardson =

British former figure skater (born 1959)

Personal information
- Other names: Karena Pazdirek
- Born: 12 October 1959 (age 66) Kensington, England

Figure skating career
- Country: Great Britain
- Retired: 1980

Karena Richardson (born 12 October 1959) is a British former figure skater who competed in ladies' singles. She is the 1976 Skate Canada International silver medalist and a four-time British national champion. She competed twice at the Winter Olympics, finishing 15th in 1976 and 12th in 1980. She was coached by Carlo Fassi in Denver, Colorado.

Richardson married Czech figure skater Zdeněk Pazdírek.

== Competitive highlights ==
International
| Event | 75–76 | 76–77 | 77–78 | 78–79 | 79–80 |
|---|---|---|---|---|---|
| Winter Olympics | 15th | | | | 12th |
| World Champ. | 13th | 15th | 11th | | |
| European Champ. | 10th | 13th | 10th | 12th | 12th |
| Skate Canada | | 2nd | | | |
| Richmond Trophy | | | | 3rd | |
National
| British Champ. | 1st | 1st | 1st | 2nd | 1st |
