= Ronald Koppelent =

Austrian figure skater

Personal information
- Born: 30 November 1955 (age 70) Linz, Austria

Figure skating career
- Country: Austria

Ronald Koppelent (born 30 November 1955 in Linz, Austria) is an Austrian figure skater who competed in men's singles. He is a four-time (1974–77) Austrian national champion and competed at the 1976 Winter Olympics.

== Competitive highlights ==
International
Event	72–73	73-74	74–75	75–76	76–77
Winter Olympics				WD	
World Champ.		16th	15th		12th
European Champ.		14th	10th	10th	7th
Prague Skate			6th		
National
Austrian Champ.	3rd	1st	1st	1st	1st
WD = Withdrew
