= William Schober =

Australian figure skater

Personal information
- Other names: Billy Schober
- Born: 14 November 1956 (age 69)

Figure skating career
- Country: Australia
- Retired: c. 1980

William "Billy" Schober (born 14 November 1956) is an Australian former competitive figure skater. He is a six-time Australian national champion, representing Victoria. He competed at five World Championships and the 1976 Winter Olympics in Innsbruck, Austria. He placed 20th in the compulsory figures at the Olympics before withdrawing.

== Competitive highlights ==
International
Event	73–74	74–75	75–76	76–77	77–78	78–79	79–80
Winter Olympics			WD				
World Champ.	25th	21st		16th		21st	17th
Blue Swords				5th			
Prague Skate				8th			
National
Australian Champ.	1st	1st	1st	1st		1st	1st
WD = Withdrew
