= David Dore =

Canadian figure skater (1940–2016)

Personal information
- Born: August 9, 1940 Toronto, Ontario, Canada
- Died: April 8, 2016 (aged 75) Ottawa, Ontario, Canada
- Occupations: President (1980–1984); Director General (1986–2004)
- Employer: Canadian Figure Skating Association

Sport
- Country: Canada
- Sport: Figure skating
- Former partners: Bonnie Anderson; Laura Maybee; Greg Folk
Medal record
Figure skating
Canadian Figure Skating Championships
Gold medal – first place	1964 North Bay	Fours

David Dore (August 9, 1940 – April 8, 2016) was a Canadian figure skating competitor and official. He won the 1964 Canadian national title in four skating. He later served as Skate Canada's president and director general and as vice-president of the International Skating Union.

== Personal life ==
Dore was born on August 9, 1940, in East York, Toronto. He nearly died from polio at the age of 12 and had to regain his ability to walk. He and his wife had two children, Paul and Chris. He died in Ottawa on April 8, 2016.

== Career ==
Having started skating as therapy after a bout of polio, Dore was coached first by Wallace Diestelmeyer and then by Sheldon Galbraith. In 1964, he became a Canadian national champion in four skating with Bonnie Anderson, Laura Maybee, and Greg Folk. After retiring from competition, he became a judge and served at seven World Figure Skating Championships and the 1984 Winter Olympics.

Dore became a director of the Canadian Figure Skating Association (now known as Skate Canada) in 1972. He became the CFSA's youngest President in 1980 and served in the role until 1984. From 1984 to 2002, he served as CFSA/Skate Canada Director General. He stepped down on January 31, 2002. During his tenure, he developed the National Team program, created the Athlete Trust, developed marketing and television concepts, and staged three World Figure Skating Championships. Under his leadership, Canadian skaters won more Olympic and world medals than during any other time. In 2002, he was elected as the 1st Vice President Figure Skating of the International Skating Union. He was the first Canadian to serve in the role.

Dore was one of the most decorated administrators and volunteers in Canadian sport. In 2002, he received the International Olympic Committee's highest honour, the Olympic Order. In 2008, he was inducted into the Skate Canada Hall of Fame and into Canada's Sports Hall of Fame.
