= Eva Peštová =

Personal information
- Born: 4 November 1952 (age 73) Prague, Czechoslovakia

Figure skating career
- Country: Czechoslovakia

Eva Peštová (born 4 November 1952) is a former ice dancer who represented Czechoslovakia. Together with Jiří Pokorný she competed at the 1976 Winter Olympics and finished in 11th place. Their best ISU Championship placement was eighth at the 1976 World Championships.

== Competitive highlights ==
(with Pokorný)

International
Event	1973–74	1974–75	1975–76
Winter Olympics			11th
World Championships	17th	10th	8th
European Championships	14th	10th	9th
Prize of Moscow News		7th	
National
Czechoslovak Champ.	2nd	1st	1st
