= Zdeněk Pazdírek =

Personal information
- Born: 13 December 1953 (age 72) Brno, Czechoslovakia
- Height: 1.67 m (5 ft 5 1/2 in)

Figure skating career
- Country: Czechoslovakia
- Retired: 1976

Zdeněk Pazdírek (born 13 December 1953) is a former competitive figure skater who represented Czechoslovakia. He is the 1974–75 national champion and competed at the 1976 Winter Olympics in Innsbruck, placing 12th. He finished in the top ten at five European Championships and two World Championships. Following his competitive career, he toured professionally with Holiday on Ice from 1981 to 1989. He married British figure skater Karena Richardson.

Pazdírek teaches skating at the Coquitlam Skating Club in British Columbia, Canada. He has coached Jordan Ju and Larkyn Austman.

== Results ==
International
Event	69–70	70–71	71–72	72–73	73–74	74–75	75–76
Winter Olympics							12th
World Champ.	14th	17th	12th	10th	9th	11th	14th
European Champ.	15th	dnf	10th	10th	8th	6th	7th
Prague Skate		4th	2nd	2nd	4th		3rd
Golden Spin of Zagreb					2nd		
Prize of Moscow News		5th	8th				
National
Czechoslovak Champ.	2nd	2nd	2nd	2nd	1st	1st	2nd
