= Minoru Sano (figure skater) =

Japanese figure skater

Personal information
- Born: June 3, 1955 (age 71) Isawa, Yamanashi, Japan
- Height: 1.68 m (5 ft 6 in)

Figure skating career
- Country: Japan
- Retired: 1977
Medal record
Representing Japan
Men's figure skating
World Championships
Bronze medal – third place	1977 Tokyo	Men's singles

Minoru Sano (佐野 稔, Sano Minoru) (born June 3, 1955) is a Japanese former competitive figure skater. He is the 1977 World bronze medalist and a five-time Japanese national champion (1972–76).

== Career ==
Sano became the Japanese national champion for the first time in the 1972–73 season. In 1973 and 1974, he stood on the podium at the Skate Canada International and Prize of Moscow News. He represented Japan at the 1976 Winter Olympics in Innsbruck, Austria and finished ninth. The next season, he won his fifth consecutive national title and went on to win bronze at the 1977 World Championships in Tokyo. It was the first time that a Japanese representative stood on the world podium in any figure skating discipline. Japan would not win another world medal in men's singles until 2002 (bronze for Takeshi Honda).

Sano subsequently retired from competition and turned professional. In 1978, he founded "Viva! Ice World" (renamed "Prince Ice World" in 1988). It was the first ice show in Japan. He appeared on many television shows as an actor, TV presenter, or a guest. He also released pop singles. He helped to popularize figure skating in Japan.

Sano is currently a TV commentator and a figure skating instructor. His former students include Shizuka Arakawa and Yamato Tamura.

== Personal life ==
Sano is married to Olympic artistic gymnast Chieko Kikkawa.

== Results ==
International
Event	70–71	71–72	72–73	73–74	74–75	75–76	76–77
Olympics						9th	
Worlds			14th	8th	10th	7th	3rd
Skate Canada				3rd	2nd		
Moscow News					3rd		
National
Japan Champ.	3rd	2nd	1st	1st	1st	1st	1st
