= Mitsuru Matsumura =

Japanese figure skater

Japanese name
- Kanji: 松村充
- Kana: まつむら みつる
Transcriptions
- Romanization: Matsumura Mitsuru

Mitsuru Matsumura
Personal information
- Born: April 9, 1957 (age 69) Yokohama, Kanagawa Prefecture, Japan
- Height: 1.67 m (5 ft 5 1/2 in)

Figure skating career
- Country: Japan
- Skating club: Senshu University; Kanagawa Military High School
- Retired: c. 1982

Mitsuru Matsumura (松村 充, Matsumura Mitsuru; born on April 9, 1957, in Yokohama) is a Japanese former competitive figure skater. He won the Japanese national title in the 1978–79 season and competed at two Winter Olympics, placing 11th in 1976 (Innsbruck) and 8th in 1980 (Lake Placid, New York). He also appeared at seven World Championships, achieving his best results, 6th, at the 1980 Worlds in Dortmund. After retiring from competition, he became a coach.

== Competitive highlights ==
International
Event	72–73	73–74	74–75	75–76	76–77	77–78	78–79	79–80	80–81	81–82
Olympics				11th				8th		
Worlds			16th	12th	8th	8th	9th	6th		18th
NHK Trophy								5th		
National
Japan Champ.	3rd	2nd	2nd	2nd	2nd	2nd	1st	2nd		2nd
