= Kent Weigle =

American ice dancer

Personal information
- Full name: Douglas Kent Weigle
- Born: February 17, 1955 (age 71) Bethesda, Maryland
- Home town: Salt Lake City, Utah

Figure skating career
- Country: United States
- Partner: Judi Genovesi
- Coach: Hugh Seaman, Barrett Brown, Glyn Watts
- Skating club: Charter Oak FSC

Douglas Kent Weigle (born February 17, 1955) is an American former competitive ice dancer. With partner Judi Genovesi, he is the 1977 U.S. national champion. They represented the United States at the 1976 Winter Olympics where they placed 15th.

Following his retirement from competitive skating, he became a coach. He works as a coach in the Salt Lake City area.

== Competitive highlights ==
(with Genovesi)

Event	1973-74	1974–75	1975–76	1976–77
Winter Olympic Games			15th	
World Championships		12th	13th	9th
U.S. Championships	5th	2nd	2nd	1st
Nebelhorn Trophy		1st		
