= Pekka Leskinen =

Finnish figure skater

Personal information
- Born: 26 February 1954 (age 72) Kuopio, Finland
- Height: 1.83 m (6 ft 0 in)

Figure skating career
- Country: Finland
- Retired: 1977

Juha Pekka Leskinen (born 26 February 1954) is a Finnish former competitive figure skater. He represented Finland at the 1976 Winter Olympics in Innsbruck and finished 13th overall. He won the Finnish national title three times (1970, 1971, 1975). Later in his career, he was an ISU Judge for Finland and judged in the 2002, 2010, and 2018 Winter Olympics.

== Results ==
International
| Event | 69–70 | 70–71 | 71–72 | 72–73 | 73–74 | 74–75 | 75–76 | 76–77 |
|---|---|---|---|---|---|---|---|---|
| Winter Olympics | | | | | | | 13th | |
| World Champ. | | | 19th | | 18th | | 10th | 10th |
| European Champ. | | 19th | 19th | | 19th | 12th | 9th | 5th |
| Nordics | 2nd | 2nd | | | 1st | 1st | | |
| Prague Skate | | 10th | | | 6th | 4th | | |
National
| Finnish Champ. | 1st | 1st | | | | 1st | | |
