= Corinna Halke =

German pair skater and sport journalist

Corinna Halke-Teichmann (born 9 July 1957 in Dortmund) is a German former pair skater and current sport journalist.

With partner Eberhard Rausch, she is the 1974–1976 German national champion. They competed five times at the European Figure Skating Championships and the World Figure Skating Championships. They placed 10th at the 1972 Winter Olympics and 8th at the 1976 Winter Olympics.

After retirement from competitive skating in 1981, she became sport journalist. She has worked for the Bayerischen Rundfunk and for the German TV-station ARD since 1984.

She is married. The couple has one child.

== Competitive highlights ==
(with Eberhard Rausch)

International
Event	71–72	72–73	73–74	74–75	75–76
Winter Olympics	10th				8th
World Championships	10th	12th	9th	9th	8th
European Championships	9th	11th	7th	8th	8th
Nebelhorn Trophy			2nd		
St. Gervais International			2nd		
National
West German Champ.	2nd		1st	1st	1st
