= Wendy Burge =

American figure skater

Wendy Burge (born October 1, 1957) is an American former competitive figure skater. Born in Alaska, she won the silver medal at the 1975 U.S. Figure Skating Championships and placed 6th at the 1976 Winter Olympics. She retired in Orange County, California after working as a professional coach for over twenty years.

== Results ==
International
Event	69–70	70–71	71–72	72–73	73–74	74–75	75–76	76–77
Winter Olympics							6th	
World Champ.						4th	8th	5th
Skate Canada						3rd		
Nebelhorn Trophy				1st				
Moscow News							2nd	
Prague Skate					2nd			
National
U.S. Championships	4th N		1st J	5th	4th	2nd	3rd	3rd
