= Eberhard Rausch =

German pair skater

Eberhard Rausch (born 11 December 1947 in Mannheim) is a former German pair skater.

With partner Corinna Halke, he is the 1974–1976 German national champion. They competed five times at the European Figure Skating Championships and the World Figure Skating Championships. They placed 10th at the 1972 Winter Olympics and 8th at the 1976 Winter Olympics.

With partner Brunhilde Bassler, he is the 1970 German national champion.

== Competitive highlights ==
=== Pairs with Brunhilde Bassler ===
International
Event	66–67	67–68	68–69	69–70	70–71
World Championships			9th	9th	12th
European Championships				8th	7th
Kennedy Memorial Winter Games				1st	
National
West German Championships	3rd		3rd	1st	2nd

=== Pairs with Corinna Halke ===
International
Event	71–72	72–73	73–74	74–75	75–76
Winter Olympics	10th				8th
World Championships	10th	12th	9th	9th	8th
European Championships	9th	11th	7th	8th	8th
Nebelhorn Trophy			2nd		
St. Gervais International			2nd		
National
West German Champ.	2nd		1st	1st	1st
