= Eric Gillies =

Canadian ice dancer

Eric Gillies (born August 19, 1952) is a former Canadian ice dancer. With partner Susan Carscallen, he competed at the 1976 Winter Olympics and won the gold medal at the 1977 Canadian Figure Skating Championships.

Gillies was born in Moncton, New Brunswick. He has 3 children, Jean-Simon Désy-Gillies, Ferris Désy-Gillies and Lurick-Alexandre Désy-Gillies. As well as has 2 step-daughters, Coralee Allaert and Rochelle Allaert.

== Results ==
With Susan Carscallen:

International
Event	73-74	74-75	75-76	76-77
Winter Olympics			13th	
World Championships		13th	10th	6th
Skate Canada		8th	6th	3rd
National
Canadian Champ.	1st J	2nd	2nd	1st
J = Junior

With Cathy Cusher:

National
Event	71-72	72-73
Canadian Champ.	4th J	8th
J = Junior

With Lynn Peckinpaugh:

National
Event	70-71
Canadian Champ.	3rd J
J = Junior
