= David Porter (figure skater) =

Canadian ice dancer

Personal information
- Born: July 6, 1949 (age 77)

Figure skating career
- Country: Canada
- Partner: Barbara Berezowski
- Retired: 1976

David Porter (born July 6, 1949 in Bowmanville, Ontario) is a former Canadian ice dancer. With partner Barbara Berezowski, he won two gold medals at the Canadian Figure Skating Championships and competed at the 1976 Winter Olympics.

On October 23, 2008, Porter was inducted into the Scuggog Sports Wall of Fame in Port Perry, Ontario.

Currently, Porter is the president of Port Fire Pyrotechnics and Special Effects and its consumer fireworks subsidiary, Wizard Pyrotechnics.

== Competitive highlights ==
(with Berezowski)

International
Event	1970–71	1971–72	1972–73	1973–74	1974–75	1975–76
Winter Olympic Games						10th
World Championships			15th	15th	9th	7th
Skate Canada International					4th	2nd
National
Canadian Championships	5th	2nd	2nd	2nd	1st	1st
Canadian Championships	1st J					

1971

- Junior Canadian Champions - 1st -Winnipeg, Manitoba

1972

- Lake Placid Invitational Championships - 1st -New York, USA

1973

- Canadian Championships - 2nd - Vancouver, British Columbia

1974

- Moscow Invitational Championships - 5th - Moscow, USSR

1975

- Moscow Invitational Championships - 5th - Moscow, USSR

1976

- Prestige Cutlery Awards - 3rd - London, England
- Berezowski / Porter became the first ice dancers in the world to become Olympians.

== Professional appearances ==
In 1976, Berezowski / Porter turned professional and toured with Toller Cranston's "The Ice Show" until 1977.

Berezowski / Porter appeared on the Canadian program "Stars on Ice" across several episodes from 1976 to 1980; including a performance in the series opener of September 21, 1976.

Berezowski / Porter performed with Ice Follies from 1978 until 1980.
