= Barbara Berezowski =

Canadian ice dancer

Personal information
- Born: September 5, 1954 (age 72) Toronto, Ontario, Canada

Figure skating career
- Country: Canada
- Partner: David Porter
- Coach: Marijane Stong
- Retired: 1983

Barbara Berezowski (born September 5, 1954) is a Canadian former ice dancer. With partner David Porter, she won two gold medals at the Canadian Figure Skating Championships and competed at the 1976 Winter Olympics. From 1994 through 2008, she served as Founding Chairperson of the Board of Governors of the Etobicoke Sports Hall of Fame. She was inducted into their athlete category in 1999.

Berezowski / Porter retired from amateur competition in 1976 and then performed in ice shows, including Toller Cranston's The Ice Show and later Ice Follies.

== Competitive highlights ==
(with Porter)

International
Event	70–71	71–72	72–73	73–74	74–75	75–76
Winter Olympics						10th
World Champ.			15th	15th	9th	7th
Skate Canada					4th	2nd
Prize of Moscow News					5th	5th
Lake Placid Invit.			1st			
Prestige Cutlery						3rd
National
Canadian Champ.	5th	2nd	2nd	2nd	1st	1st
Canadian Champ.	1st J					

Berezowski was named "Miss Charm on Ice" at the 1974 and 1975 Prize of Moscow News. In 1976, Berezowski/Porter became the first ice dancers in the world to become Olympians. Berezowski was selected as "Miss Olympics" at the 1976 Winter Olympic Games, Innsbruck, Austria by world journalists. She also won the title of "Miss Toronto" 1975–1976 and was a finalist in the 1976 Miss Canada Beauty Pageant.

=== Professional career ===
- 1976–1977 Berezowski/Porter turned professional and toured with Toller Cranston's "The Ice Show"
- 1977 World Professional Dance Champions – 1st Jaca, Spain
- 1978–1980 Toured with Ice Follies.
- 1982 Headlined in Professional Ice Show in "Stars on Ice" Seoul, South Korea
- 1999 Performed in "Legendary Night of Figure Skating" celebrating Canadian figure skating champions, Air Canada Centre, Toronto Canada
