= Susan Carscallen =

Canadian ice dancer

Susan Carscallen (born March 5, 1955) is a Canadian former ice dancer. With partner Eric Gillies, she competed at the 1976 Winter Olympics and won the gold medal at the 1977 Canadian Figure Skating Championships.

Carscallen was born in Sudbury, Ontario.

== Results ==
(with Eric Gillies)

International
Event	73-74	74-75	75-76	76-77
Winter Olympics			13th	
World Championships		13th	10th	6th
Skate Canada		8th	6th	3rd
National
Canadian Champ.	1st J	2nd	2nd	1st
J = Junior

(with George O'Riley)

National
Event	71-72	72-73
Canadian Champ.	11th J	11th J
J = Junior

(ladies' singles)

National
Event	71-72
Canadian Champ.	15th J
J = Junior
