= Ursula Nemec =

Austrian pair skater

Personal information
- Other names: Ursula Koll
- Born: 9 May 1957 (age 69) Vienna, Austria

Figure skating career
- Country: Austria
- Partner: Michael Nemec
- Retired: 1976

Ursula Nemec (married name: Koll; born 9 May 1957 in Vienna) is an Austrian former pair skater. With her brother, Michael Nemec, she represented Austria at the 1976 Winter Olympics, where they placed 10th.

She is the mother of Manuel Koll.

== Competitive highlights ==
(with Nemec)

International
Event	71–72	72–73	73–74	74–75	75–76
Winter Olympics					10th
World Championships		15th	14th	12th	11th
European Championships	15th	9th	8th	10th	9th
Nebelhorn Trophy			3rd		
National
Austrian Championships	1st	1st	1st	1st	1st
