= Michael Nemec =

Austrian pair skater

Personal information
- Born: 26 November 1955 (age 70) Vienna, Austria

Figure skating career
- Country: Austria
- Partner: Ursula Nemec; Penny Booth; Joy Troup (medley)
- Retired: 1976

Michael Nemec (born 26 November 1955) is an Austrian former pair skater. With his sister, Ursula Nemec, he represented Austria at the 1976 Winter Olympics, where the pair placed 10th.

== Competitive highlights ==
=== With Ursula Nemec ===
International
Event	71–72	72–73	73–74	74–75	75–76
Winter Olympics					10th
World Championships		15th	14th	12th	11th
European Championships	15th	9th	8th	10th	9th
Nebelhorn Trophy			3rd		
National
Austrian Championships	1st	1st	1st	1st	1st

=== With Penny Booth ===
National
Event	1976–77
Austrian Championships	1st
