= Lynn Nightingale =

Canadian figure skater

Personal information
- Born: August 5, 1956 (age 69) Edmonton, Alberta

Figure skating career
- Country: Canada
- Skating club: Minto Skating Club
- Retired: 1977

Lynn Nightingale, later Connor (born August 5, 1956) is a Canadian former competitive figure skater. She won gold medals at the Skate Canada International, Prague Skate, Richmond Trophy and Prize of Moscow News, as well as four Canadian national titles (1974–77). She finished in the top ten at the 1976 Winter Olympics in Innsbruck, where she placed 9th, and at five World Championships.

Nightingale graduated from the University of Western Ontario in 1985.

== Results ==
International
| Event | 71–72 | 72–73 | 73–74 | 74–75 | 75–76 | 76–77 |
|---|---|---|---|---|---|---|
| Olympics | | | | | 9th | |
| Worlds | | 10th | 6th | 7th | 7th | 8th |
| Skate Canada | | | 1st | 1st | | |
| Moscow News | | | | 1st | | |
| Prague Skate | | | 1st | | | |
| Richmond Trophy | | | | | 1st | |
National
| Canadian Champ. | 1st J | 3rd | 1st | 1st | 1st | 1st |
J: Junior level
