= 1977 U.S. Figure Skating Championships =

Figure skating competition

1977 US Figure Skating Championships
- Type: National Championship
- Date: February 2 – February 6
- Season: 1976-77
- Location: Hartford, Connecticut

Champions
- Men's singles: Charles Tickner (Senior); Robert Wagenhoffer (Junior)
- Women's singles: Linda Fratianne (Senior); Sandy Lenz (Junior)
- Pairs: Tai Babilonia and Randy Gardner (Senior); Vicki Heasley and Robert Wagenhoffer (Junior)
- Ice dance: Judi Genovesi and Kent Weigle (Senior); Kelley Morris and Michael Seibert (Junior)
- Previous: 1976 U.S. Championships
- Next: 1978 U.S. Championships

The 1977 U.S. Figure Skating Championships were held from February 2-6 in Hartford, Connecticut. Gold, silver, and bronze medals were awarded in four disciplines – men's singles, women's singles, pair skating, and ice dancing – across three levels: senior, junior, and novice.

The event determined the U.S. teams for the 1977 World Figure Skating Championships.

== Senior results ==
=== Men ===
Rank	Name
1	Charles Tickner
2	Scott Cramer
3	David Santee
4	John Carlow, Jr.
5	Mahlon Bradley
6	Randy Gardner
7	Scott Carson
8	Billy Schneider
9	Scott Hamilton
10	Tim Zink
11	Charles Carapazza

=== Women ===
Rank	Name
1	Linda Fratianne
2	Barbie Smith
3	Wendy Burge
4	Priscilla Hill
5	Lisa-Marie Allen
6	Tai Babilonia
7	Kathy Gelecinskyj
8	Jeanne Chapman
9	Aimee Kravette
10	Editha Dotson
11	Suzle Brasher
12	Grace Jones

=== Pairs ===
Rank	Name
1	Tai Babilonia / Randy Gardner
2	Gail Hamula / Frank Sweiding
3	Sheryl Franks / Mike Botticelli
4	Lorene Mitchell / Donald Mitchell
5	Tracy Prussack / Scott Prussack
6	Holly Blunt / Bruce Hurd
7	Lyndy Marron / Hal Marron
8	Dee Dee Doris / Ron Doris
9	Cheryl Stewart / Jeff Stewart
10	Kathie Laisure / Brian Kader

=== Ice dancing (Gold dance) ===
Rank	Name
1	Judi Genovesi / Kent Weigle
2	Susan Kelley / Andrew Stroukoff
3	Michelle Ford / Glenn Patterson
4	Stacey Smith / John Summers
5	Carol Fox / Richard Dalley
6	Dee Oseroff / Craig Bond
7	Jackie Booth / Tim Hodges
8	Sheila Corcoran / J.J. Kohlhas, Jr.
9	Bonnie Burton / William Burton, Jr.
10	Cathy Marron / Hal Marron
11	Helen Zinn / David Chrien

== Junior results ==
=== Men ===
Rank	Name
1	Robert Wagenhoffer
2	Reginald Stanley
3	Reggie Radford
4	Ted Masdea
5	Patrick Hughes
6	Bill Tilghman
7	Richard Perez
8	Stephen Box
9	Orest John Jowyk
10	Bruno Jerry

=== Women ===
Rank	Name
1	Sandy Lenz
2	Cindy Perpich
3	Clarissa Perrella
4	Lisa Griffin
5	Vicki Heasley
6	Lori Benton
7	Tina Miezio,
8	Staci Loop
9	Lori Nichol
10	Sheryl Abbot

=== Pairs ===
Rank	Name
1	Vicki Heasley / Robert Wagenhoffer
2	Maria DiDomenico / Larry Schrier
3	Mary Lou Robinson / Ray Belmonte
4	Caitlin Carruthers / Peter Carruthers
5	Danelle Porter / David Hicks
6	Lynne Freeman / Jay Freeman
7	Sue Schaull / Chuck Schaull
8	Lynne Sweet / Bruce Sweet
9	Kathy Swick / Richard Murphy

=== Ice dancing (Silver dance) ===
Rank	Name
1	Kelley Morris / Michael Seibert
2	Felicia DiGiusto / Donald Adair
3	Hae Sue Park / Patrick Shannon
4	Karen Berzon / Gary Forman
5	Judy Blumberg / Robert Engler
6	Becky Baker / Rick Berg
7	Linda Munz / Donald Steiner
8	Caitlin Carruthers / Peter Carruthers
9	Susan DeRosa / Cory Mims

== Sources ==
- Skating magazine, Mar 1977
