= 1979 Skate America =

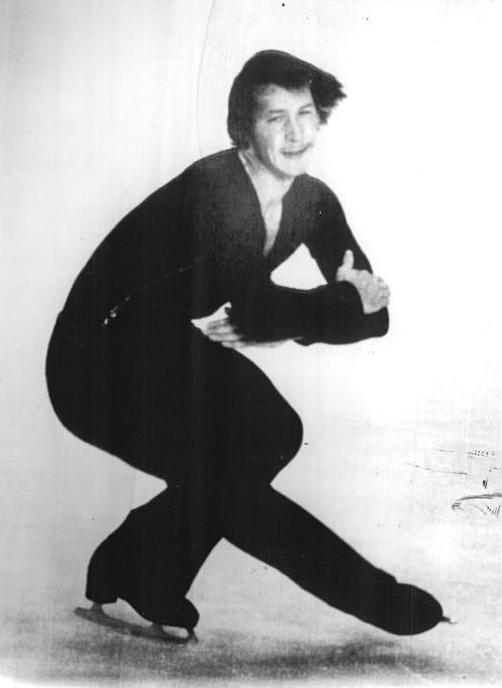
- Season: 1979–80
- Location: Lake Placid, New York
- Host: U.S. Figure Skating
- Venue: Olympic Center Arena

Champions
- Men's singles: (United States) Scott Hamilton
- Ladies' singles: (United States) Lisa-Marie Allen
- Pairs: (East Germany) Sabine Baeß / Tassilo Thierbach
- Ice dance: (Hungary) Krisztina Regőczy / András Sallay
- Next: 1981 Skate America

The 1979 Skate America (officially called Norton Skate) was held in Lake Placid, New York. This was the inaugural event. It was the test event for the upcoming 1980 Winter Olympics. Medals were awarded in the disciplines of men's singles, ladies' singles, pair skating, and ice dancing.

== Results ==
=== Men ===
Rank	Name	Nation
1	Scott Hamilton	United States
2	Scott Cramer	United States
3	Jan Hoffmann	East Germany
...		

=== Ladies ===
Rank	Name	Nation
1	Lisa-Marie Allen	United States
2	Susanna Driano	Italy
3	Sandy Lenz	United States
4	Denise Biellmann	Switzerland

=== Pairs ===
Rank	Name	Nation
1	Sabine Baeß / Tassilo Thierbach	East Germany
2	Kitty Carruthers / Peter Carruthers	United States
3	Vicki Heasley / Robert Wagenhoffer	United States
4	Zhanna Ilyina / Alexander Ulasov	Soviet Union

=== Ice dancing ===
Rank	Name	Nation
1	Krisztina Regőczy / András Sallay	Hungary
2	Natalia Bestemianova / Andrei Bukin	Soviet Union
3	Lorna Wighton / John Dowding	Canada
4	Judy Blumberg / Michael Seibert	United States
5		
6	Carol Fox / Richard Dalley	United States
...		
