= 1978 World Figure Skating Championships =

Annual figure skating competition held in 1978

- Type: ISU Championship
- Date: 7–12 March
- Season: 1977–78
- Location: Ottawa, Canada
- Venue: Ottawa Civic Centre

Champions
- Men's singles: (United States) Charles Tickner
- Ladies' singles: (East Germany) Anett Pötzsch
- Pairs: (Soviet Union) Irina Rodnina / Alexander Zaitsev
- Ice dance: (Soviet Union) Natalia Linichuk / Gennadi Karponosov
- Previous: 1977 World Championships
- Next: 1979 World Championships

The 1978 World Figure Skating Championships were held in Ottawa, Ontario, Canada, 7–12 March. At the event, sanctioned by the International Skating Union, medals were awarded in men's singles, ladies' singles, pair skating, and ice dancing.

Vern Taylor of Canada became the first person to land a triple axel (albeit over rotated) in official competition.

== Medal tables ==
=== Medalists ===
| Discipline | Gold | Silver | Bronze |
|---|---|---|---|
| Men's singles | (United States) Charles Tickner | (East Germany) Jan Hoffmann | (United Kingdom) Robin Cousins |
| Ladies' singles | (East Germany) Anett Pötzsch | (United States) Linda Fratianne | (Italy) Susanna Driano |
| Pair skating | (Soviet Union) Irina Rodnina / Alexander Zaitsev | (East Germany) Manuela Mager / Uwe Bewersdorf | (United States) Tai Babilonia / Randy Gardner |
| Ice dancing | (Soviet Union) Natalia Linichuk / Gennadi Karponosov | (Soviet Union) Irina Moiseeva / Andrei Minenkov | (Hungary) Krisztina Regőczy / András Sallay |

=== Medals by country ===
| Rank | Nation | Gold | Silver | Bronze | Total |
|---|---|---|---|---|---|
| 1 | Soviet Union (URS) | 2 | 1 | 0 | 3 |
| 2 | East Germany (GDR) | 1 | 2 | 0 | 3 |
| 3 | United States (USA) | 1 | 1 | 1 | 3 |
| 4 | Great Britain (GBR) | 0 | 0 | 1 | 1 |
| 4 | Hungary (HUN) | 0 | 0 | 1 | 1 |
| 4 | Italy (ITA) | 0 | 0 | 1 | 1 |
| Totals (6 entries) | | 4 | 4 | 4 | 12 |

== Results ==
=== Men ===
| Rank | Name | Nation | Age | CP | | SP | | FP | | Points | Places |
|---|---|---|---|---|---|---|---|---|---|---|---|
| 1 | Charles Tickner | United States | 24 | 3 | 42.56 | 3 | 41.16 | 2 | 103.60 | 187.32 | 17 |
| 2 | Jan Hoffmann | East Germany | 22 | 2 | 43.00 | 1 | 41.56 | 3 | 102.30 | 186.86 | 18 |
| 3 | Robin Cousins | United Kingdom | 20 | 4 | 39.80 | 2 | 41.72 | 1 | 105.10 | 186.62 | 22 |
| 4 | Vladimir Kovalev | Soviet Union | 25 | 1 | 43.76 | 7 | 39.80 | 6 | 99.00 | 182.56 | 40 |
| 5 | Igor Bobrin | Soviet Union | 24 | 6 | 38.42 | 5 | 40.04 | 5 | 101.00 | 179.44 | 47 |
| 6 | David Santee | United States | 20 | 5 | 39.20 | 4 | 40.40 | 8 | 98.30 | 177.90 | 57 |
| 7 | Fumio Igarashi | Japan | 19 | 8 | 37.04 | 6 | 39.08 | 4 | 101.00 | 177.12 | 56 |
| 8 | Mitsuru Matsumura | Japan | 20 | 9 | 36.08 | 8 | 39.08 | 11 | 95.20 | 170.36 | 83 |
| 9 | Mario Liebers | East Germany | 18 | 7 | 37.32 | 11 | 38.24 | 12 | 93.00 | 168.56 | 86 |
| 10 | Brian Pockar | Canada | 18 | 12 | 34.44 | 10 | 38.44 | 9 | 97.10 | 169.98 | 86 |
| 11 | Scott Hamilton | United States | 19 | 11 | 35.28 | 9 | 38.72 | 10 | 94.80 | 168.80 | 92 |
| 12 | Vern Taylor | Canada | | 15 | 30.56 | 12 | | 7 | | 166.50 | 105 |
| 13 | Konstantin Kokora | Soviet Union | 20 | 10 | 36.04 | 13 | | 13 | | 163.92 | 110 |
| 14 | Rudi Cerne | West Germany | 19 | 13 | 33.84 | 14 | | 14 | | 159.16 | 127 |
| 15 | Gilles Beyer | France | | 14 | 33.08 | 15 | | 15 | | 154.84 | 134 |
| 16 | Brian Meek | Australia | | 16 | 29.92 | 16 | | 16 | | 133.28 | 144 |
| 17 | Han Soo-bong | South Korea | | 17 | 27.68 | 17 | | 17 | | 119.80 | 153 |

Referee:

- Sonia Bianchetti Italy

Assistant Referee:

- Benjamin T. Wright United Kingdom

Judges:

- Gerhard Frey West Germany
- Oskar Urban Czechoslovakia
- Ludwig Gassner Austria
- Ramona McIntyre United States
- Pamela Peat United Kingdom
- Walburga Grimm East Germany
- Kinuko Ueno Japan
- Dorothy MacLeod Canada
- Monique Georgelin France

Substitute judge:

- Ferenc Kertész Hungary

=== Ladies ===
| Rank | Name | Nation | CP | SP | FP | Placings |
|---|---|---|---|---|---|---|
| 1 | Anett Pötzsch | East Germany | 1 | 2 | 3 | 11 |
| 2 | Linda Fratianne | United States | 3 | 1 | 1 | 16 |
| 3 | Susanna Driano | Italy | 4 | 6 | 6 | 33 |
| 4 | Dagmar Lurz | West Germany | 2 | 10 | 7 | 45 |
| 5 | Denise Biellmann | Switzerland | 16 | 3 | 2 | 52 |
| 6 | Elena Vodorezova | Soviet Union | 13 | 4 | 5 | 50 |
| 7 | Lisa-Marie Allen | United States | 14 | 5 | 4 | 48 |
| 8 | Emi Watanabe | Japan | 6 | 13 | 8 | 77 |
| 9 | Priscilla Hill | United States | 5 | 8 | 10 | 78 |
| 10 | Carola Weißenberg | East Germany | 9 | 7 | 9 | 87 |
| 11 | Karena Richardson | United Kingdom | 12 | 11 | 11 | 103 |
| 12 | Heather Kemkaran | Canada | 10 | 9 | 14 | 118 |
| 13 | Claudia Kristofics-Binder | Austria | 11 | 12 | 15 | 116 |
| 14 | Kristiina Wegelius | Finland | 7 | 16 | 13 | 119 |
| 15 | Natalia Strelkova | Soviet Union | 15 | 15 | 12 | 132 |
| 16 | Danielle Rieder | Switzerland | 8 | 14 | 18 | 141 |
| 17 | Cathie MacFarlane | Canada | 17 | 17 | 20 | 159 |
| 18 | Astrid Jansen in de Wal | Netherlands | 22 | 19 | 16 | 165 |
| 19 | Karin Riediger | West Germany | 18 | 20 | 19 | 169 |
| 20 | Bodil Olsson | Sweden | 21 | 18 | 17 | 171 |
| 21 | Robyn Burley | Australia | 20 | 21 | 21 | 190 |
| 22 | Choo Young-soon | South Korea | 19 | 22 | 22 | 198 |
| 23 | Katie Symmonds | New Zealand | 23 | 23 | 23 | 206 |

Referee:

- Elemér Terták Hungary

Assistant Referee:

- David Dore Canada

Judges:

- Walter Hüttner Austria
- Pamela Davis United Kingdom
- Margaret Berezowski Canada
- Goro Ishimaru Japan
- Ingrid Linke East Germany
- Markus Germann Switzerland
- Eva von Gamm West Germany
- Giorgio Siniscalco Italy
- E. Newbold Black IV United States

Substitute judge:

- Leena Vainio Finland

=== Pairs ===
| Rank | Name | Nation | SP | FP | Placings |
|---|---|---|---|---|---|
| 1 | Irina Rodnina / Alexander Zaitsev | Soviet Union | 1 | 1 | 9 |
| 2 | Manuela Mager / Uwe Bewersdorf | East Germany | 2 | 2 | 19 |
| 3 | Tai Babilonia / Randy Gardner | United States | 4 | 3 | 28 |
| 4 | Marina Cherkasova / Sergei Shakhrai | Soviet Union | 3 | 4 | 39 |
| 5 | Sabine Baeß / Tassilo Thierbach | East Germany | 5 | 5 | 46 |
| 6 | Ingrid Spieglová / Alan Spiegl | Czechoslovakia | 6 | 6 | 50 |
| 7 | Marina Pestova / Stanislav Leonovich | Soviet Union | 7 | 7 | 65 |
| 8 | Susanne Scheibe / Andreas Nischwitz | West Germany | 8 | 8 | 71 |
| 9 | Sheryl Franks / Michael Botticelli | United States | 9 | 9 | 83 |
| 10 | Gail Hamula / Frank Sweiding | United States | 10 | 10 | 85 |
| 11 | Lee-Ann Jackson / Paul Mills | Canada | 13 | 11 | 105 |
| 12 | Sabine Fuchs / Xavier Videau | France | 12 | 12 | 108 |
| 13 | Gabrielle Beck / Jochen Stahl | West Germany | 14 | 13 | 113 |
| 14 | Elizabeth Cain / Peter Cain | Australia | 16 | 14 | 127 |
| 15 | Kyoko Hagiwara / Sumio Murata | Japan | 15 | 15 | 131 |
| WD | Sherri Baier / Robin Cowan | Canada | 11 | | |

Referee:

- Oskar Madl Austria

Assistant Referee:

- Donald H. Gilchrist Canada

Judges:

- Eva von Gamm West Germany
- Walburga Grimm East Germany
- Goro Ishimaru Japan
- Leena Vainio Finland
- Monique Georgelin France
- Norris Bowden Canada
- Elaine DeMore United States
- Oskar Urban Czechoslovakia
- Giorgio Siniscalco Italy

Substitute judge:

- Pamela Davis United Kingdom

=== Ice dancing ===
| Rank | Name | Nation | CD | FD | Placings |
|---|---|---|---|---|---|
| 1 | Natalia Linichuk / Gennadi Karponosov | Soviet Union | 1 | 1 | 11 |
| 2 | Irina Moiseeva / Andrei Minenkov | Soviet Union | 2 | 2 | 16 |
| 3 | Krisztina Regőczy / András Sallay | Hungary | 3 | 3 | 29 |
| 4 | Janet Thompson / Warren Maxwell | United Kingdom | 4 | 4 | 35 |
| 5 | Liliana Řeháková / Stanislav Drastich | Czechoslovakia | 5 | 6 | 49 |
| 6 | Lorna Wighton / John Dowding | Canada | 6 | 5 | 48 |
| 7 | Marina Zueva / Andrei Vitman | Soviet Union | 7 | 7 | 69 |
| 8 | Carol Fox / Richard Dalley | United States | 8 | 8 | 69 |
| 9 | Stacey Smith / John Summers | United States | 9 | 9 | 82 |
| 10 | Susi Handschmann / Peter Handschmann | Austria | 11 | 10 | 93 |
| 11 | Jayne Torvill / Christopher Dean | United Kingdom | 10 | 11 | 92 |
| 12 | Patricia Fletcher / Michael de la Penotiere | Canada | 12 | 12 | 113 |
| 13 | Stefania Bertele / Walter Cecconi | Italy | 13 | 13 | 114 |
| 14 | Henriette Fröschl / Christian Steiner | West Germany | 14 | 14 | 124 |
| 15 | Muriel Boucher / Yves Malatier | France | 15 | 15 | 135 |
| 16 | Michiko Abe / Nozomu Sakai | Japan | 16 | 16 | 144 |

Referee:

- George J. Blundun Canada

Assistant Referee:

- Emil Skákala Czechoslovakia

Judges:

- Lino Clerici Italy
- Nancy Meiss United States
- Gerhard Frey West Germany
- Oskar Urban Czechoslovakia
- Roy Haines Canada
- Ferenc Kertész Hungary
- Lysiane Lauret France
- Roy Mason United Kingdom
- Ludwig Gassner Austria

Substitute judge:

- Inkeri Soininen Finland

== Controversies ==
Soviet judges were banned from officiating at the year's events due to reported bias by the International Skating Union. An editorial in The Globe and Mail suggested that in response to this the Russian ice-dancing team, normally known for "stern purity", performed "x-rated" routines to the consternation of the judges. Female skaters were given warnings regarding modesty requirements of their costumes, forcing modifications.
