= Figure skating at the 1980 Winter Olympics =

Figure skating at the XIII Winter Olympics
- Type: Olympic Games

Champions
- Men's singles: (United Kingdom) Robin Cousins
- Ladies' singles: (East Germany) Anett Pötzsch
- Pairs: (Soviet Union) Irina Rodnina / Alexander Zaitsev
- Ice dance: (Soviet Union) Natalia Linichuk / Gennadi Karponossov
- Previous: 1976 Winter Olympics
- Next: 1984 Winter Olympics

Figure skating at the 1980 Winter Olympics took place at the Olympic Center Arena in Lake Placid, New York, United States.

== Medal table ==
Rank	Nation	Gold	Silver	Bronze	Total
1	Soviet Union	2	1	1	4
2	East Germany	1	1	1	3
3	Great Britain	1	0	0	1
4	United States	0	1	1	2
5	Hungary	0	1	0	1
6	West Germany	0	0	1	1
Totals (6 entries)		4	4	4	12

== Participating NOCs ==
Twenty nations sent figure skaters to compete in the events at Lake Placid.

- Australia
- Austria
- Canada
- China
- Czechoslovakia
- East Germany
- Finland
- France
- Great Britain
- Hungary
- Italy
- Japan
- South Korea
- Soviet Union
- Spain
- Sweden
- Switzerland
- United States
- West Germany
- Yugoslavia

== Results ==
=== Men ===
Rank	Name	Nation	CF	SP	FS	Points	Places
1	Robin Cousins	Great Britain	4	1	1	189.48	13
2	Jan Hoffmann	East Germany	1	2	2	189.72	15
3	Charles Tickner	United States	2	5	3	187.06	28
4	David Santee	United States	3	3	5	185.52	34
5	Scott Hamilton	United States	8	4	4	181.78	45
6	Igor Bobrin	Soviet Union	7	6	8	177.40	55
7	Jean-Christophe Simond	France	6	10	9	175.00	64
8	Mitsuru Matsumura	Japan	11	7	7	172.28	75
9	Fumio Igarashi	Japan	13	8	6	172.04	77
10	Konstantin Kokora	Soviet Union	10	11	10	168.18	91
11	Hermann Schulz	East Germany	9	9	13	166.70	98
12	Brian Pockar	Canada	12	12	12	163.26	107
13	Rudi Cerne	West Germany	15	13	11	159.30	116
14	Thomas Öberg	Sweden	14	14	14	149.80	127
15	Christopher Howarth	Great Britain	16	15	15	145.66	134
16	Xu Zhaoxiao	China	17	16	16	117.16	144
WD	Vladimir Kovalev	Soviet Union	5				

Note: Soviet officials withdrew Kovalev from the competition after he placed 5th in compulsory figures.

Referee:

- Sonia Bianchetti

Assistant Referee:

- Elemér Terták

Judges:

- (Canada) Alice Pinos
- (East Germany) Walburga Grimm
- (Soviet Union) Tatiana Danilenko
- (United States) Ramona McIntyre
- (France) Alain Calmat
- (Sweden) Britta Lindgren
- (United Kingdom) Sally-Anne Stapleford
- (West Germany) Elfride Beyer
- (Japan) Tsukasa Kimura
- (Australia) Jacqueline Kendall-Baker (substitute)

=== Ladies ===
Rank	Name	Nation	CF	SP	FS	Points	Places
1	Anett Pötzsch	East Germany	1	4	3	189.00	11
2	Linda Fratianne	United States	3	1	2	188.30	16
3	Dagmar Lurz	West Germany	2	5	6	183.04	28
4	Denise Biellmann	Switzerland	12	2	1	180.06	43
5	Lisa-Marie Allen	United States	8	3	4	179.42	45
6	Emi Watanabe	Japan	4	8	5	179.04	48
7	Claudia Kristofics-Binder	Austria	5	7	9	176.88	60
8	Susanna Driano	Italy	6	14	10	172.82	77
9	Sandy Lenz	United States	11	6	7	172.74	82
10	Kristiina Wegelius	Finland	7	11	12	172.04	87
11	Sanda Dubravčić	Yugoslavia	13	10	8	170.30	100
12	Karena Richardson	Great Britain	10	9	14	168.94	109
13	Karin Riediger	West Germany	15	13	11	166.32	120
14	Danielle Rieder	Switzerland	9	15	16	165.46	125
15	Heather Kemkaran	Canada	16	12	15	164.64	128
16	Kira Ivanova	Soviet Union	18	16	13	161.54	144
17	Susan Broman	Finland	14	17	17	157.54	152
18	Christina Riegel	West Germany	17	19	18	149.50	162
19	Franca Bianconi	Italy	19	18	19	144.82	134
20	Shin Hae-sook	South Korea	20	22	22	128.18	134
21	Gloria Mas	Spain	21	20	21	126.56	190
22	Bao Zhenghua	China	22	21	20	126.96	191

Referee:

- Benjamin T. Wright

Assistant Referee:

- Donald H. Gilchrist

Judges:

- (West Germany) Wolfgang Kunz
- (Austria) Ludwig Gassner
- (Japan) Kinuko Ueno
- (United States) Charles U. Foster
- (Socialist Federal Republic of Yugoslavia) Radovan Lipovšćak
- (Finland) Leena Vainio
- (Italy) Giorgio Siniscalco
- (East Germany) Ingrid Linke
- (Switzerland) Markus Germann
- (Soviet Union) Sergei Kononykhin (substitute)

=== Pairs ===
Medal favorites Tai Babilonia / Randy Gardner were forced to withdraw before the competition due to an injury to Gardner.

Rank	Name	Nation	SP	FS	Points	Places
1	Irina Rodnina / Alexander Zaitsev	Soviet Union	1	1	147.26	9
2	Marina Cherkasova / Sergei Shakhrai	Soviet Union	2	2	143.80	19
3	Manuela Mager / Uwe Bewersdorff	East Germany	4	3	140.52	33
4	Marina Pestova / Stanislav Leonovich	Soviet Union	3	4	141.14	31
5	Kitty Carruthers / Peter Carruthers	United States	5	5	137.38	46
6	Sabine Baeß / Tassilo Thierbach	East Germany	6	6	136.00	53
7	Sheryl Franks / Michael Botticelli	United States	7	7	133.84	64
8	Christina Riegel / Andreas Nischwitz	West Germany	8	8	131.70	71
9	Barbara Underhill / Paul Martini	Canada	9	9	129.36	78
10	Susy Garland / Robert Daw	Great Britain	11	10	124.36	91
11	Elizabeth Cain / Peter Cain	Australia	10	11	121.30	98
WD	Tai Babilonia / Randy Gardner	United States				

Referee:

- Hermann Schiechtl

Assistant Referee:

- Oskar Madl

Judges:

- (East Germany) Walburga Grimm
- (United States) Hugh C. Graham Jr.
- (France) Alain Calmat
- (Canada) Dennis McFarlane
- (Australia) Jacqueline Kendall-Baker
- (Czechoslovakia) Milan Duchón
- (West Germany) Elfriede Beyer
- (Japan) Kinuko Ueno
- (Soviet Union) Sergei Kononykhin
- (Austria) Ludwig Gassner (substitute)

=== Ice dance ===
Rank	Name	Nation	CD	FD	Points	Places
1	Natalia Linichuk / Gennadi Karponosov	Soviet Union	1	2	205.48	13
2	Krisztina Regőczy / András Sallay	Hungary	2	1	204.52	14
3	Irina Moiseeva / Andrei Minenkov	Soviet Union	3	3	201.86	27
4	Liliana Řeháková / Stanislav Drastich	Czechoslovakia	4	4	198.02	39
5	Jayne Torvill / Christopher Dean	Great Britain	5	5	197.12	42
6	Lorna Wighton / John Dowding	Canada	6	6	193.80	54
7	Judy Blumberg / Michael Seibert	United States	7	7	190.30	66
8	Natalia Bestemianova / Andrei Bukin	Soviet Union	9	9	188.18	75
9	Stacey Smith / John Summers	United States	8	8	188.38	75
10	Henriette Fröschl / Christian Steiner	West Germany	10	10	178.38	94
11	Susanne Handschmann / Peter Handschmann	Austria	11	11	177.78	96
12	Karen Barber / Nicky Slater	Great Britain	12	12	176.92	104

Referee:

- Lawrence Demmy

Assistant Referee:

- Edith Shoemaker

Judges:

- (West Germany) Wolfgang Kunz
- (United States) Virginia LeFevre
- (Soviet Union) Igor Kabanov
- (Czechoslovakia) Gerhardt Bubník
- (Hungary) Pál Vásárhelyi
- (Austria) Rudolf Zorn
- (Canada) Suzanne Francis
- (United Kingdom) Brenda Long
- (France) Lysiane Lauret
- (Japan) Tsukasa Kimura (substitute)
