= Susanna Driano =

American-Italian figure skater

Personal information
- Born: May 28, 1957 (age 69) Seattle, Washington
- Height: 1.65 m (5 ft 5 in)

Figure skating career
- Country: Italy
- Skating club: Associazione Sportivi Ghiaccio Ambrosiana
- Retired: 1985
Medal record
Figure skating: Ladies' singles
Representing Italy
World Championships
| Bronze medal – third place | 1978 Ottawa | Ladies' singles |
European Championships
| Bronze medal – third place | 1980 Gothenburg | Ladies' singles |
| Bronze medal – third place | 1977 Helsinki | Ladies' singles |

Susanna Driano (born May 28, 1957) is an American-Italian former competitive figure skater who competed for Italy. She is the 1978 World bronze medalist, a two-time European bronze medalist (1976, 1980), and a five-time Italian national champion.

== Personal life ==
Driano was born on May 28, 1957, in Seattle, Washington, to a Canadian-born mother and Italian father.

== Career ==
Driano competed internationally for Italy. In the 1974–75 season, she won the first of her six consecutive Italian national titles and was sent to her first ISU Championships; she finished sixth at the 1975 Europeans and ninth at the 1975 Worlds.

At the start of the following season, Driano was awarded the gold medal at the 1975 Skate Canada International. She placed fifth at the 1976 Europeans in Geneva, Switzerland; 7th at the 1976 Winter Olympics in Innsbruck, Austria; and tenth at the 1976 Worlds in Gothenburg, Sweden.

Driano won the bronze medal behind Anett Pötzsch and Dagmar Lurz at the 1977 European Championships in Helsinki, Finland. Her next major international medal came the following season. At the 1978 World Championships in Ottawa, Ontario, Canada, she ranked fourth in figures, sixth in the short program, and sixth in the free program. She won the bronze medal behind Pötzsch and Linda Fratianne.

Driano was awarded bronze at the 1980 European Championships in Gothenburg, behind Pötzsch and Lurz. She placed 6th in figures, 14th in the short, 10th in the free, and 8th overall at the 1980 Winter Olympics in Lake Placid, New York. She withdrew from the 1980 World Championships and stopped competing but never turned professional. Making a brief return to competition, she placed fourth at the 1985 Winter Universiade in Belluno, Italy.

Driano was coached by Carlo Fassi.

== Results ==
International
| Event | 74–75 | 75–76 | 76–77 | 77–78 | 78–79 | 79–80 | 84–85 |
|---|---|---|---|---|---|---|---|
| Olympics | | 7th | | | | 8th | |
| Worlds | 9th | 10th | 6th | 3rd | 8th | WD | |
| Europeans | 6th | 5th | 3rd | 5th | 8th | 3rd | |
| Skate America | | | | | | 2nd | |
| Skate Canada | | 1st | | | | | |
| NHK Trophy | | | | | | 4th | |
| Schäfer Memorial | | | | | | 1st | |
| Richmond Trophy | | | 2nd | | 1st | | |
| Prague Skate | | 2nd | | | | | |
| Universiade | | | | | | | 4th |
National
| Italian Championships | 1st | 1st | | 1st | 1st | 1st | |
