= Richmond Trophy =

Annual figure skating competition in London, England

The Richmond Trophy was an international figure skating competition for ladies' singles held annually from 1949 to 1980 at the Richmond Ice Rink in Twickenham, London. It was the only invitational international competition (as opposed to the ISU Championships) held on a regular basis in the post-war years. The competition was sponsored by the National Skating Association and was largely due to the activity of Arnold Gerschwiler, coach of many champions at the Richmond rink.

At the last event in November 1980, participation was down to only eleven competitors, attributed to scheduling conflicts with the growing number of other international competitions such as Skate Canada International. Moreover, the National Skating Association had two years previously started another international competition, the St. Ivel International, also held at the Richmond rink but earlier in the fall and including competition in all four disciplines of skating, which by 1980 was already established as one of the more prestigious competitions on the international circuit. Therefore, the ladies-only Richmond Trophy event was discontinued.

== Medalists ==
Ladies' medalists
Year	Gold	Silver	Bronze	Refs
1949				
1950				
1951	(Australia) Nancy Burley			
1952	(United Kingdom) Yvonne Sugden	(Netherlands) Lidy Stoppelman	(United Kingdom) Doreen Spowart	
1953	(United Kingdom) Yvonne Sugden	(United Kingdom) Anne Robinson	(Netherlands) Lidy Stoppelman	
1954	(United Kingdom) Patricia Pauley	(Netherlands) Sjoukje Dijkstra	(United Kingdom) Clema Cowley	
1955	(United Kingdom) Yvonne Sugden	(Netherlands) Joan Haanappel	(Netherlands) Sjoukje Dijkstra	
1956	(Netherlands) Sjoukje Dijkstra	(Netherlands) Joan Haanappel	(Switzerland) Karin Borner	
1957	(Netherlands) Sjoukje Dijkstra	(United Kingdom) Patricia Pauley	(United Kingdom) Diana Clifton-Peach	
1958	(Netherlands) Sjoukje Dijkstra	(United Kingdom) Carolyn Krau	(United Kingdom) Diana Clifton-Peach	
1959	(Netherlands) Joan Haanappel	(United Kingdom) Carolyn Krau	(France) Nicole Hassler	
1960	(France) Nicole Hassler	(United Kingdom) Carolyn Krau	(United Kingdom) Barbara Conniff	
1961	(France) Nicole Hassler	(United Kingdom) Barbara Conniff	(United Kingdom) Heather Moir	
1962	(France) Nicole Hassler	(United States) Carol Noir	(United Kingdom) Anne Lenton	
1963				
1964				
1965	(West Germany) Uschi Keszler	(Hungary) Zsuzsa Almássy	(East Germany) Beate Richter	
1966	(Hungary) Zsuzsa Almássy			
1967	(Hungary) Zsuzsa Almássy	(Austria) Beatrix Schuba		
1968	(Austria) Elisabeth Nestler	(United Kingdom) Patricia Dodd	(Czechoslovakia) Eleonora Baricka	
1969	(Austria) Elisabeth Nestler	(United Kingdom) Patricia Dodd	(Italy) Rita Trapanese	
1970	(Italy) Rita Trapanese	(United Kingdom) Patricia Dodd	(United States) Dawn Glab	
1971	(East Germany) Christine Errath	(Canada) Cathy Lee Irwin	(Japan) Kazumi Yamashita	
1972	(United States) Dorothy Hamill	(Switzerland) Karin Iten	(United Kingdom) Jean Scott	
1973	(Netherlands) Dianne de Leeuw	(United Kingdom) Maria McLean	(Switzerland) Karin Iten	
1974	(East Germany) Marion Weber	(West Germany) Isabel de Navarre	(United States) Kath Malmberg	
1975	(Canada) Lynn Nightingale	(United States) Barbie Smith	(United States) Linda Fratianne	
1976	(United States) Barbie Smith	(Italy) Susanna Driano	(Canada) Heather Kemkaran	
1977	(United States) Priscilla Hill	(Finland) Kristiina Wegelius	(Switzerland) Denise Biellmann	
1978	(Italy) Susanna Driano	(United States) Carrie Rugh	(United Kingdom) Karena Richardson	
1979	(United States) Alicia Risberg	(East Germany) Carola Weißenberg	(United States) Simone Grigorescu	
1980	(United Kingdom) Karen Wood	(East Germany) Janina Wirth	(East Germany) Carola Paul	
