= Manuela Mager =

German former pair skater (born 1962)

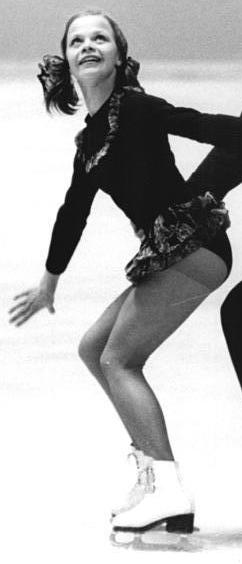
- Manuela Mager (1978)

Personal information
- Born: 11 July 1962 (age 63) Dresden, Bezirk Dresden, East Germany

Figure skating career
- Country: East Germany
- Retired: 1980
Medal record
Representing East Germany
Pairs' Figure skating
Olympic Games
Bronze medal – third place	1980 Lake Placid	Pairs
World Championships
Silver medal – second place	1980 Dortmund	Pairs
Silver medal – second place	1978 Ottawa	Pairs
European Championships
Bronze medal – third place	1978 Strasbourg	Pairs

Manuela Mager (later Holzapfel; born 11 July 1962 in Dresden, Bezirk Dresden, German Democratic Republic) is a German former pair skater.

Mager was a team with Uwe Bewersdorf in pair skating. She skated for the club SC Einheit Dresden and was representing East Germany. Her coach was Uta Hohenhaus The pair Mager/Bewersdorf was the first in the world to execute in competition a clean thrown loop. Mager finished her figure skating career 1980.

After her figure skating career she left East Germany and moved to Bavaria.

== Results ==
pairs (with Bewersdorf)

Event	1976–77	1977–78	1978–79	1979–80
Winter Olympics				3rd
World Championships	5th	2nd		2nd
European Championships	4th	3rd		5th
East German Championships	1st	1st		2nd
Prize of Moscow News	3rd			
