= Mike Richter =

American ice hockey player (born 1966)

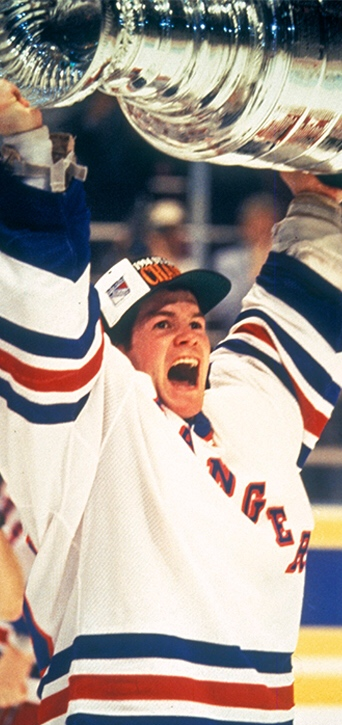
- Richter lifting the Stanley Cup in 1994
- Born: September 22, 1966 (age 60) Abington, Pennsylvania, U.S.
- Height: 5 ft 11 in (180 cm)
- Weight: 190 lb (86 kg; 13 st 8 lb)
- Position: Goaltender
- Caught: Left
- Played for: New York Rangers
- National team: United States
- NHL draft: 28th overall, 1985; New York Rangers
- Playing career: 1989–2003
Medal record
Men's ice hockey
Representing United States
Olympic Games
Silver medal – second place	2002 Salt Lake City	Ice hockey
World Cup
Gold medal – first place	1996 World Cup of Hockey	Ice hockey
World Junior Championships
Bronze medal – third place	1986 Hamilton	Ice hockey

Michael Thomas Richter (born September 22, 1966) is an American former professional ice hockey goaltender in the National Hockey League (NHL). He played all 14 seasons of his career with the New York Rangers.

Richter played college hockey for Wisconsin for two years before being drafted by the Rangers in the 1985 draft. He made his debut with the team with one start in the 1989 Stanley Cup playoffs and soon became part of a rotation with John Vanbiesbrouck, which would last for three years before Richter became the primary netminder following a trade in 1993. In the 1993–94 season, he led the league in wins with 42 in 68 starts while backstopping the Rangers with four shutouts in the playoffs on their way to the Stanley Cup Final, which they won in seven games for the first championship for the organization in 54 years. He won his 300th game in 2002, becoming the first Ranger to achieve the mark. A series of concussions ultimately saw Richter retire prior to the 2003–04 season. The following year, the Rangers retired his number 35 jersey, making him the third player to receive the honor.

He represented the United States in international play on several occasions, winning the World Cup of Hockey in 1996 and finishing with the silver medal at the 2002 Winter Olympics. In 2008, alongside teammate Brian Leetch, Richter was enshrined into the United States Hockey Hall of Fame.

== Early life ==
Richter grew up in Flourtown, Pennsylvania, near Philadelphia, and idolized Philadelphia Flyers goaltender Bernie Parent. He attended and played for Germantown Academy in Fort Washington, Pennsylvania, and then Northwood School in Lake Placid, New York, graduating in 1985. He also played at the Wissahickon Skating Club. After playing for the United States in the World Junior Championships in 1985, Richter played for the University of Wisconsin–Madison from 1985 to 1987. He was selected as WCHA Freshman of the Year in 1985 and ultimately went 33–25–1 with the team in two seasons; he was later named to the Athletic Hall of Fame.

== Playing career ==
The New York Rangers made Richter the 28th overall pick in the 1985 NHL entry draft. He again represented the United States in the 1986 World Junior Championships, as well as the World Championships and the 1988 Winter Olympics in Calgary, before making his NHL debut in the 1989 playoffs. Though he lost the one game in which he played, he was soon a regular member of the Rangers, posting 12 wins against five losses in his rookie season as the club's backup goaltender.

Over the next two seasons, Richter split goaltending duties with the Rangers' veteran starter, John Vanbiesbrouck, and was selected to play for the U.S. in the 1991 Canada Cup tournament. In the January 31 game of the 1990–91 season, Richter passed Jacques Plante to set a franchise record in saves for one game with 59 (with 26 of them coming in the third period alone) as the Rangers held on to a 3-3 tie against the Vancouver Canucks. The advent of the expansion draft in 1993 had the Rangers at a crossroads with what to do with their goaltenders, particularly with the possibility of losing a goaltender without compensation. As such, Vanbiesbrouck was traded to the Vancouver Canucks on June 20 for future considerations in a move designed to have the Rangers protect Richter. Richter then had his first campaign as the team's number one goaltender. He posted a career best 42 wins and 2.57 goals against average as the Rangers won the Presidents' Trophy as the league's top regular season team for the second time in three years. He was also named Most Valuable Player of the NHL All-Star Game, which the Rangers hosted at Madison Square Garden. In the playoffs, he ramped up his play, becoming the eighth goaltender to post four shutouts in one playoff season. The Rangers reached the Stanley Cup Final against the Canucks, and Richter earned a career highlight in game four, famously stopping Vancouver sniper Pavel Bure on a penalty shot. The Rangers defeated the Canucks in seven games to win their first Stanley Cup since 1940.

Over the next few years, Richter would be consistently ranked among the world's top goaltenders. He led the United States to victory in the 1996 World Cup of Hockey, with his efforts (5–1, 2.89 GAA, .923 save percentage) earning him tournament Most Valuable Player honors. Until the 2026 Winter Olympics, Richter was the last goaltender to win a gold medal for the United States in an international tournament. Injuries plagued much of his career, including MCL sprains, ACL sprains, and concussions.

His last appearance in the Stanley Cup playoffs would be 1997, as a series of knee injuries and a string of mediocre Ranger teams saw his personal statistics suffer. Nevertheless, he was selected as the top goalie for Team USA in the 1998 and 2002 Olympics, winning a silver medal in the 2002 Games.

Richter was selected by the Nashville Predators in the 1998 NHL Expansion Draft, but as a UFA chose to eventually return to the Rangers that summer while the team got a compensatory pick.

By the 2001–02 season, Richter had spent the past two summers rehabbing separate injuries to his knees but was still felt in some circles to be among the best American goaltenders when healthy.

On June 30, 2002, Richter's rights were traded to the Edmonton Oilers in exchange for future considerations. At the time, teams that lost more "Group III unrestricted free agents" than they signed could be awarded compensatory picks after the first round as a way to offset the loss. By doing it the way they did, Edmonton collected a compensatory draft pick for losing Richter (which in this case was a third round pick in the 2003 draft) when he signed with the Rangers on July 4 while giving a lower draft pick (a fourth round pick) to New York. On October 28 of the 2002–03 season, he won his 300th game as a goaltender, doing so for the Rangers at home against the Phoenix Coyotes in overtime. He became the 19th goaltender to reach 300 wins in NHL history. In a game on November 5 against the Edmonton Oilers, Richter suffered a concussion on a collision. It occurred just eight months after previously suffering a fractured skull on a puck that struck his mask.

He ultimately would not be cleared to play hockey again and subsequently announced his retirement in September 2003. He finished his career as the Rangers all-time leader in wins (301) and games played (666), marks which would later be surpassed by Henrik Lundqvist.

Richter's style of play was very acrobatic and quick. For a small goalie he made himself look big by using his lightning quick reflexes to make saves. He was rarely out of position and always square to his shooters. He was known for making plenty of desperation saves using his focus, flexibility, and athleticism. Longtime teammate and Hall of Fame Ranger defenseman Brian Leetch once said about Richter: "I have never seen anyone more focused than he was. As the game got tougher, he got better. If a goal was ever scored on him I was always surprised." On February 4, 2004, Richter's number 35 jersey was retired by the New York Rangers in a pregame ceremony at Madison Square Garden, making him the third player to receive the honor in franchise history.

== Post-retirement ==
Richter is currently the President of Brightcore Energy.

In 2007 and 2009, Richter stated that he would be interested in running for Congress as a Democrat in either Connecticut's 4th congressional district or New York's 20th congressional district special election, 2009.

After retiring from the NHL, Richter enrolled in Yale University, entering through the highly competitive Eli Whitney Students Program, Yale College's admissions program for non-traditional students. He received his degree in Ethics, Politics, and Economics with a concentration in Environmental Policy (EP&E).

He was previously a founding partner at Healthy Planet Partners, a sustainable power finance and consulting group, and Environmental Capital Partners, a $100 million private equity fund focusing on resource efficiency. Richter serves on the board of trustees for the Adirondack Nature Conservancy, and sits as a member of the National Advisory Council for the Sierra Club. He recently began collaborating with the Natural Resources Defense Council (NRDC) in their effort to bring the best ecological practices to the sports industry. He also launched Athletes for a Healthy Planet, an organization dedicated to fostering an understanding of the connections between environmental issues, human health, economy, social justice, and well-being.

Richter, together with other retired NHL players, played in a UN Environment Programme-sponsored hockey game near the North Pole in April 2019. The idea for the game was conceived by Russian hockey legend Viacheslav Fetisov, and was intended to raise awareness of receding ice in polar regions due to climate change.

Richter has three sons, all of whom grew up playing ice hockey in their hometown of Greenwich, Connecticut.

== Career statistics ==
=== Regular season and playoffs ===
			Regular season									Playoffs
Season	Team	League	GP	W	L	T	MIN	GA	SO	GAA	SV%	GP	W	L	MIN	GA	SO	GAA	SV%
1982–83	Germantown Academy	HS-PA	—	—	—	—	—	—	—	—	—	—	—	—	—	—	—	—	—
1983–84	Tropicana Little Flyers Junior "B"	NEJHL	36	23	10	3	2160	94	—	2.61	—	—	—	—	—	—	—	—	—
1984–85	Northwood School	HS-Prep	18	—	—	—	1374	52	2	2.27	—	—	—	—	—	—	—	—	—
1985–86	University of Wisconsin	WCHA	24	14	9	0	1394	92	0	3.96	.886	—	—	—	—	—	—	—	—
1986–87	University of Wisconsin	WCHA	36	19	16	1	2136	126	0	3.54	.901	—	—	—	—	—	—	—	—
1987–88	United States National Team	Intl	29	17	7	2	1559	86	—	3.31	—	—	—	—	—	—	—	—	—
1987–88	Colorado Rangers	IHL	22	16	5	0	1298	68	0	3.14	.902	10	5	3	536	35	0	3.92	—
1988–89	Denver Rangers	IHL	57	23	26	0	3031	217	1	4.30	—	4	0	4	210	21	0	6.00	—
1988–89	New York Rangers	NHL	—	—	—	—	—	—	—	—	—	1	0	1	58	4	0	4.14	.867
1989–90	New York Rangers	NHL	23	12	5	5	1320	66	0	3.00	.904	6	3	2	330	19	0	3.45	.896
1989–90	Flint Spirits	IHL	13	7	4	2	782	49	0	3.76	.900	—	—	—	—	—	—	—	—
1990–91	New York Rangers	NHL	45	21	13	7	2596	135	0	3.12	.903	6	2	4	313	14	1	2.68	.923
1991–92	New York Rangers	NHL	41	23	12	2	2298	119	3	3.11	.901	7	4	2	412	24	1	3.50	.894
1992–93	New York Rangers	NHL	38	13	19	3	2105	134	1	3.82	.886	—	—	—	—	—	—	—	—
1992–93	Binghamton Rangers	AHL	5	4	0	1	305	6	0	1.18	.964	—	—	—	—	—	—	—	—
1993–94	New York Rangers	NHL	68	42	12	6	3710	159	5	2.57	.910	23	16	7	1417	49	4	2.07	.921
1994–95	New York Rangers	NHL	35	14	17	2	1993	97	2	2.92	.890	7	2	5	384	23	0	3.59	.878
1995–96	New York Rangers	NHL	41	24	13	3	2396	107	3	2.68	.912	11	5	6	662	36	0	3.26	.883
1996–97	New York Rangers	NHL	61	33	22	6	3598	161	4	2.68	.917	15	9	6	939	33	3	2.11	.932
1997–98	New York Rangers	NHL	72	21	31	15	4143	184	0	2.66	.903	—	—	—	—	—	—	—	—
1998–99	New York Rangers	NHL	68	27	30	8	3878	170	4	2.63	.910	—	—	—	—	—	—	—	—
1999–00	New York Rangers	NHL	61	22	31	8	3622	173	0	2.87	.905	—	—	—	—	—	—	—	—
2000–01	New York Rangers	NHL	45	20	21	3	2635	144	0	3.28	.893	—	—	—	—	—	—	—	—
2001–02	New York Rangers	NHL	55	24	26	4	3195	157	2	2.95	.906	—	—	—	—	—	—	—	—
2002–03	New York Rangers	NHL	13	5	6	1	694	34	0	2.94	.897	—	—	—	—	—	—	—	—
NHL totals			666	301	258	73	38,183	1,840	24	2.89	.904	76	41	33	4,515	202	9	2.68	.909

=== International ===
Year	Team	Event	GP	W	L	T	MIN	GA	SO	GAA	SV%
1985	United States	WJC	3	—	—	—	43	6	0	8.37	—
1986	United States	WJC	4	3	1	0	208	9	0	2.60	—
1986	United States	WC	1	0	1	0	53	5	0	5.66	—
1987	United States	WC	2	0	2	0	80	8	0	6.00	—
1988	United States	OLY	4	2	2	0	230	15	0	3.91	.802
1991	United States	CC	7	4	3	0	420	22	0	3.14	.904
1993	United States	WC	4	1	1	2	237	13	0	3.29	—
1996	United States	WCH	6	4	2	0	371	15	0	2.43	.923
1998	United States	OLY	4	1	3	0	237	14	0	3.54	.849
2002	United States	OLY	4	2	1	1	240	9	1	2.25	.932
Junior totals			7	—	—	—	251	15	0	3.59	—
Senior totals			32	14	15	3	1868	101	1	3.24	—

== Awards and honors ==
Award	Year
All-WCHA Second Team	1986–87

- NHL All-Star Game: 1992, 1994, 2000
- NHL All-Star Game MVP: 1994
- Stanley Cup champion: 1994

== Rangers team records ==
- Single season wins: 42 (1993–94)
- Most saves in a game: 59

== Legacy ==
Richter was awarded the team MVP award twice and won the Players' Player Award twice. He was awarded the Frank Boucher Trophy four times for most popular player. He also was honored with awards for his contributions in the community and with the media. He was inducted into the U.S. Hockey Hall of Fame in 2008 and received the Lester Patrick Award alongside Mark Messier and Jim Devellano the following year. In the 2009 book 100 Ranger Greats, ranked No. 3 all-time of the 901 New York Rangers (and ranked highest of the 74 who were goaltenders) who had played during the team's first 82 seasons. Lastly, he was inducted into the Philadelphia Sports Hall of Fame in 2014.

Awards and achievements
Preceded by Brett Hull	WCHA Freshman of the Year; 1985–86	Succeeded by Dave Shields
