= Elisabeth Nestler =

Austrian figure skater

Personal information
- Other names: Liesl Nestler
- Born: 14 November 1951 (age 74) Vienna, Austria

Figure skating career
- Country: Austria
- Skating club: EK Engelmann
- Retired: c. 1970

Elisabeth "Liesl" Nestler (born 14 November 1951) is an Austrian former competitive figure skater. She represented Austria at the 1968 Winter Olympics, placing 23rd, and at seven ISU Championships, finishing in the top ten four times. Her highest placement was 5th, achieved at the 1969 European Championships in Garmisch-Partenkirchen and 1970 European Championships in Leningrad. Her best world result, 7th, came at the 1969 World Championships in Colorado Springs, Colorado.

== Competitive highlights ==
International
| Event | 65–66 | 66–67 | 67–68 | 68–69 | 69–70 |
|---|---|---|---|---|---|
| Winter Olympics | | | 23rd | | |
| World Champ. | 16th | | 15th | 7th | |
| European Champ. | 12th | | 7th | 5th | 5th |
| Prague Skate | 5th | 3rd | | | |
| Richmond Trophy | | | | 1st | 1st |
| Austrian Championships | 3rd | 3rd | 2nd | 2nd | 2nd |
