= Karin Borner =

Swiss figure skater (1935–2025)

Personal information
- Born: 21 September 1935
- Died: 13 September 2025 (aged 89)

Figure skating career
- Country: Switzerland

Karin Borner (21 September 1935 – 13 September 2025) was a Swiss competitive figure skater. She represented Switzerland at the 1956 Winter Olympics in Cortina d'Ampezzo. She won the bronze medal at the 1956 Richmond Trophy. Borner died on 13 September 2025, at the age of 89.

== Competitive highlights ==
International
Event	1955–56	1956–57
Winter Olympics	16th	
World Championships	17th	
European Championships	15th	
Richmond Trophy		3rd
