= Nicole Hassler =

French figure skater

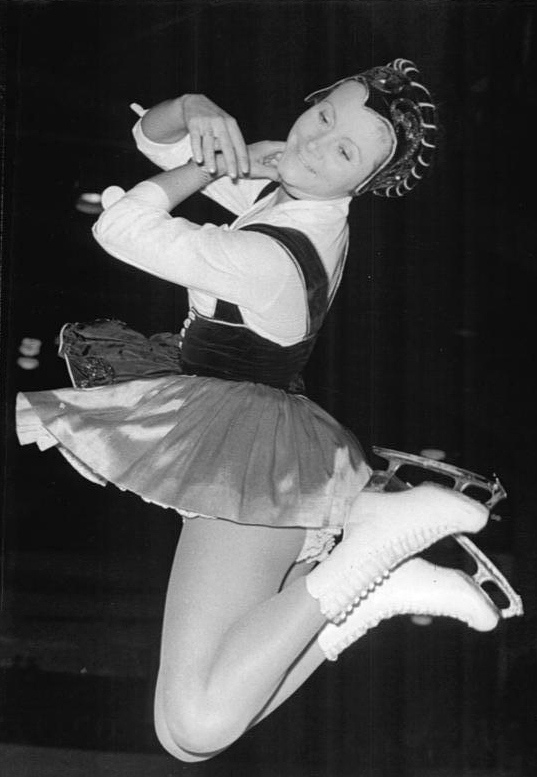

Personal information
- Full name: Nicole Hassler
- Born: 6 January 1941 Chamonix
- Died: 19 November 1996 (aged 55)

Figure skating career
- Country: France
- Retired: 1966
Medal record
Representing France
Ladies' Figure skating
World Championships
Bronze medal – third place	1963 Dortmund	Ladies' singles
European Championships
Bronze medal – third place	1966 Bratislava	Ladies' singles
Bronze medal – third place	1965 Moscow	Ladies' singles
Bronze medal – third place	1964 Grenbole	Ladies' singles
Silver medal – second place	1963 Budapest	Ladies' singles

Nicole Hassler (6 January 1941 – 19 November 1996) was a French figure skater. She was the 1963 World bronze medalist, the 1963 European silver medalist and the 1964-1966 European bronze medalist. She represented France at the 1960 Winter Olympics, where she placed 11th and at the 1964 Winter Olympics, where she placed 4th. She was born in Chamonix and was the daughter of Albert Hassler.

== Competitive highlights ==
International
Event	57–58	58–59	59–60	60–61	61–62	62–63	63–64	64–65	65–66
Winter Olympics			11th				4th		
World Champ.	23rd		12th		6th	3rd	4th	8th	5th
European Champ.		16th	10th	8th	6th	2nd	3rd	3rd	3rd
Prague Skate								1st	
Richmond Trophy			3rd	1st	1st	1st			
National
French Champ.	3rd	2nd	1st	2nd	1st	1st	1st	1st	1st
