= Mabel Fairbanks =

American figure skater and coach (1915–2001)

- Mabel Fairbanks

Personal information
- Born: November 14, 1915 Florida, Florida Everglades
- Died: September 29, 2001 (aged 85) Burbank, California

Figure skating career
- Country: United States
- Coach: Maribel Vinson Owen; Howard Nicholson

Mabel Fairbanks (November 14, 1915 – September 29, 2001) was an American figure skater and coach. As an African American and Native American woman she paved the way for other minorities to compete in the sport of figure skating such as Tai Babilonia, Debi Thomas, and Naomi Lang. She was inducted into the US Figure Skating Hall of Fame, as the first person of African American and Native American descent, and the International Women's Sports Hall of Fame.

== Youth ==
Fairbanks was born on November 14, 1915, in Florida's Everglades. Her father was African American while her mother had a Seminole mother and a father of English descent. In a 1999 interview, she said, "my mother took in everybody – every kid off the street – and gave them a place to stay and something to eat. So I never knew who were my real sisters and brothers, but my older sister told me there were 14."

Fairbanks was orphaned at the age of eight when her mother died. After staying with a teacher who treated her like a "maid," she joined one of her brothers in New York City. She worked for him and his wife at their fish market on 8th Avenue in Harlem but they became displeased when, out of sympathy, she gave a family more fish than they had paid for. A wealthy woman saw her sleeping on a park bench and offered her a job as a babysitter at a home overlooking Central Park.

== Career ==
Fairbanks began figure skating around 1925 to 1928. After observing children at the Central Park ice rink, she bought herself used skates, stuffed them with cotton because they were two sizes too big, and began skating at the rink. She said, "Blacks didn't skate there. But it was a public place, so I just carried on." She gained further inspiration after seeing Sonja Henie in the 1936 film One in a Million.

In the 1930s, Fairbanks, due to her race, was denied access to the local rink by the cashier but she kept returning until the manager admitted her. Maribel Vinson Owen and Howard Nicholson provided her with technical advice. Fairbanks was not allowed to compete in the national qualifying event for the Olympics or any competition. In a 1998 interview, she said, "If I had gone to the Olympics and become a star, I would not be who I am today."

Fairbanks performed in shows in New York until the 1940s. She often wore pink or purple skate boots rather than the more common black or white. She practiced on a 6 ft by 6 ft rink constructed by her uncle Wally in her room. After relocating to Los Angeles, she toured internationally, skating with Ice Capades in Mexico and later with Ice Follies. After returning to the United States, she saw a sign with "Colored Trade Not Solicited" at the Pasadena Winter Gardens. She stated, "my uncle had newspaper articles written about it and passed them out everywhere until they finally let me in."

Fairbanks coached singles and pairs, including Tiffany Chin, Billy Chapel, Scott Hamilton, Kristi Yamaguchi / Rudy Galindo, Tai Babilonia / Randy Gardner, Leslie Robinson, Michelle McCladdie, Richard Ewell, Debi Thomas, Atoy Wilson, and Jean Yuna. She also taught skating to the children of many celebrities. In 1997, she became the first African American inducted into the US Figure Skating Hall of Fame. She was inducted into the International Women's Sports Hall of Fame in October 2001.

== Death ==
Mabel Fairbanks was diagnosed with myasthenia gravis in 1997 and with acute leukemia in mid-2001. She died on September 29, 2001, at Providence Saint Joseph Medical Center in Burbank, California. She is buried at the Hollywood Forever Cemetery, Hollywood, California.

== See also ==
- Naomi Lang
