= Barbie Smith =

American figure skater

Personal information
- Native name: Barbie Smith
- Occupation: Figure skater

Sport
- Country: United States of America
- Sport: Figure skater
- Team: U.S

Barbie Smith is an American former competitive figure skater. She won the silver medal in ladies' singles at the 1977 U.S. Figure Skating Championships and finished fourth at the World Figure Skating Championships that year.

== Life ==
Smith was born in Toronto, Canada, and she began skating at age 6. She did not attended regular school as a teenager due to the demands of skating. She preferred competing in compulsory figures rather than the free skating, as she felt figures were more objectively scored.

Smith was the US Novice champion in 1973 and the national Junior champion in 1974. She missed the chance to qualify for the 1976 Winter Olympics due to a stress fracture in her leg, which almost ended her career.

In February 1977 she competed in the U.S. Figure Skating Championships in Hartford, Connecticut, where she placed first in both the compulsory figures and short program. In the free skate, she landed a triple Salchow jump and ended in second after the favorite, Linda Fratianne, landed two triple jumps in her program.

She finished fourth at the World Figure Skating Championships that year. Afterward, worried about her ability to support herself in the future and to function outside the world of skating, she retired and enrolled in university. While she was in university, she coached, and she later joined Ice Capades.

== Results ==
Event	1975	1976	1977
World Championships			4th
U.S. Championships	4th	WD	2nd
