= Uwe Bewersdorf =

German pair skater

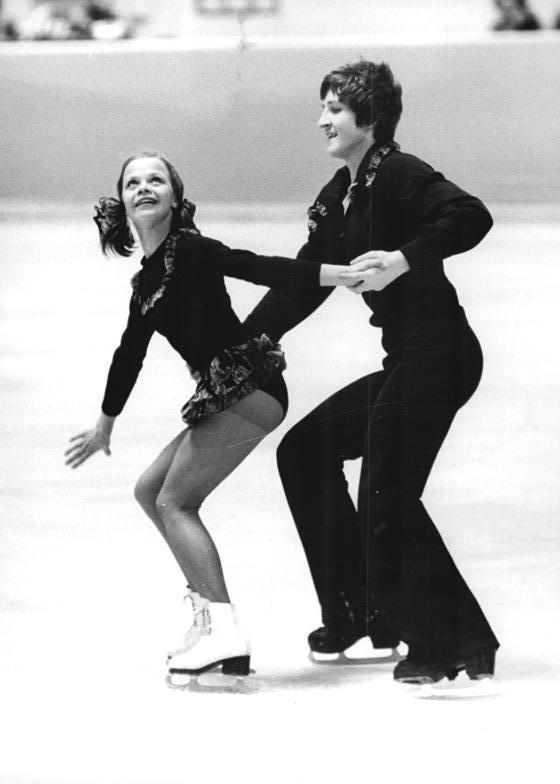
- Manuela Mager with Uwe Bewersdorf (1978)

Personal information
- Born: 4 November 1958 (age 67) Freital, Bezirk Dresden, East Germany

Figure skating career
- Country: East Germany
- Retired: 1980
Medal record
Representing East Germany
Pairs' Figure skating
Olympic Games
Bronze medal – third place	1980 Lake Placid	Pairs
World Championships
Silver medal – second place	1980 Dortmund	Pairs
Silver medal – second place	1978 Ottawa	Pairs
European Championships
Bronze medal – third place	1978 Strasbourg	Pairs

Uwe Bewersdorf (born 4 November 1958 in Freital, Bezirk Dresden, East Germany) is a German former pair skater.

Uwe Bewersdorf was a pair with Manuela Mager. He started to skate with the age of 7 at the club Betriebs-Sportbund-Gemeinschaft Post Dresden. Later the club was renamed into SC Einheit Dresden. He was representing East Germany (GDR). His coach was Uta Hohenhaus.

The pair Mager/Bewersdorf was the first in the world to execute in competition a clean thrown loop. Because Manuela Mager finished her figure skating career in 1980 he had to change his skating partner. He teamed up with Marina Schulz. However the pair could not qualify for international competitions due to many injuries.

Uwe Bewersdorf studied sport at the DHfK in Leipzig.

He works as a tax accountant in Baden-Württemberg.

Uwe Bewersdorf's name is sometimes spelled with double “F“ in the end. This happened due to a mistake of German Bureaucracy. His parents are spelled with a single “F”.

== Results ==
pairs (with Mager)

Event	1976–77	1977–78	1978–79	1979–80
Winter Olympics				3rd
World Championships	5th	2nd		2nd
European Championships	4th	3rd		5th
East German Championships	1st	1st		2nd
Prize of Moscow News	3rd			
