= Yvonne Sugden =

British figure skater

Personal information
- Full name: Yvonne de Montfort Boyer Sugden
- Born: 14 October 1939 (age 86) Amersham, England

Figure skating career
- Country: United Kingdom
- Retired: 1956

Yvonne de Montfort Boyer Sugden (born 14 October 1939) is a British former figure skater who competed in ladies' singles. She is a three-time European medalist (bronze in 1954, silver in 1955 and 1956) and a three-time British national champion (1954–56). She placed fourth at the 1956 Winter Olympics.

== Results ==
International
Event	1951–52	1952–53	1953–54	1954–55	1955–56
Winter Olympics					4th
World Champ.			6th	8th	4th
European Champ.	18th	5th	3rd	2nd	2nd
Richmond Trophy	1st	1st		1st	
National
British Champ.			1st	1st	1st
