= Atoy Wilson =

American figure skater

Personal information
- Born: 1951 or 1952

Figure skating career
- Country: United States
- Retired: 1971

Atoy Wilson (born around 1951 or 1952) is a retired American figure skater. Coached by Mabel Fairbanks and then Peter Betts, he represented the Los Angeles Skating Club.

Wilson began skating when he was eight years old; he asked for lessons after seeing an Ice Follies performance. In 1965, he was the first African-American skater to compete at the U.S. Figure Skating Championships, placing second in the novice division. He and his mother were unable to stay at the official competition hotel, as it was segregated and only allowed white guests. At the 1966 championships, he won the novice title despite falling on his first jump in his free skate and became the first black skater to win a national title in figure skating.

Afterward, he moved up to the junior level and then qualified for the senior level, but in 1969, he chose to pursue a degree at Loyola Marymount University and finished his competitive career rather than attempt to qualify for the 1972 Winter Olympics team. He toured professionally with Ice Follies and Holiday on Ice from 1971 until 1988.

Following his retirement as a performer, Wilson was a coach and assistant director of ice skating schools for Hyatt Regency hotels in Dubai. A stint on the business side of Warner Brothers followed, and he is currently involved in production accounting for the television industry. In 2025, he was added to the United States Figure Skating Hall of Fame.

== Results ==
National
Event	1965	1966
U.S. Championships	2nd N.	1st N.
N. = Novice level
