= Patricia Dodd =

Personal information
- Full name: Patricia Ann Dodd
- Born: April 7, 1948 (age 78) Toronto, Ontario, Canada

Figure skating career
- Country: United Kingdom
- Retired: 1971
Medal record
Commonwealth Winter Games
Bronze medal – third place	1966 St Moritz	Figure Skating - Women's Singles

Patricia Ann Dodd (born April 7, 1948) is a former figure skater who competed in ladies' singles for Great Britain. She is a three-time British national champion (1969 to 1971) and finished 15th at the 1968 Winter Olympics. Other notable results included an 8th-place finish at the 1969 World Championships and 6th place at the 1970 and 1971 European Championships.

== Results ==
International
Event	1967–68	1968–69	1969–70	1970–71
Winter Olympics	15th			
World Championships	12th	8th	9th	12th
European Championships	9th	9th	6th	6th
Richmond Trophy		2nd	2nd	2nd
National
British Championships		1st	1st	1st
