= Stoppelman =

Stoppelman is a surname. Notable people with the surname include:

- Jeremy Stoppelman (born 1977), American business executive
- Lidy Stoppelman (born 1933), Dutch figure skater
