= Carrie Rugh =

American figure skater

Personal information
- Born: c. 1961 (age 64–65)
- Home town: El Segundo, California

Figure skating career
- Country: United States
- Skating club: Los Angeles FSC

Carrie Rugh (born c. 1961) is an American former competitive figure skater. She is the 1976 Nebelhorn Trophy silver medalist, 1976 Grand Prix International St. Gervais bronze medalist, 1978 Richmond Trophy silver medalist, and 1979 U.S. national bronze medalist. She trained at the Los Angeles Figure Skating Club. The mayor of El Segundo, California proclaimed February 14, 1979 as "Carrie Rugh Day". After retiring from competition, she performed with the Ice Capades.

Rugh attended El Segundo High School.

== Competitive highlights ==
International
Event	1975–76	1976–77	1977–78	1978–79
World Champ.				11th
Nebelhorn Trophy		2nd		
Richmond Trophy				2nd
St. Gervais		3rd		
National
U.S. Champ.	1st J		4th	3rd
J: Junior level
