= Wissahickon Skating Club =

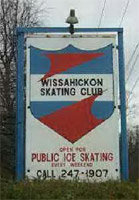
- The Entrance sign to Wissahickon Skating Club

Wissahickon Skating Club
- Location: 550 West Willow Grove Avenue, Philadelphia, Pennsylvania, United States
- Founded: 1956
- Type: Private
- Club Colors: Red, White, Blue

Executive Committee
- President: Kevin R. Hamel
- Vice President-Ice Committee: Kathryn Larkin
- Vice President-Membership: Mike Budd
- Vice President-House Committee: Richard J. Podulka
- Secretary: Shawn Connaghan
- Treasurer: Jeffrey Rexford
- Website: http://www.wissskating.com

The Wissahickon Skating Club (abbreviated as WSC) is a non-profit skating club that is located in the Chestnut Hill section of Philadelphia.

It officially opened on October 28, 1956 with a skating exhibition that was attended by Rainier III, Prince of Monaco and his wife, Princess Grace (formerly the actress, Grace Kelly), whose niece, Meg Davis, participated in the exhibition.

Two-time Olympian and New York Rangers Stanley Cup Champion goaltender Mike Richter is an alumnus of the club, and Scott Cramer, a two-time silver medalist in the U.S. Figure Skating Championships, and Olympic bronze medalist Adam Rippon have both trained here.

The original building, which was renovated in 2019, still stands today.

== History ==
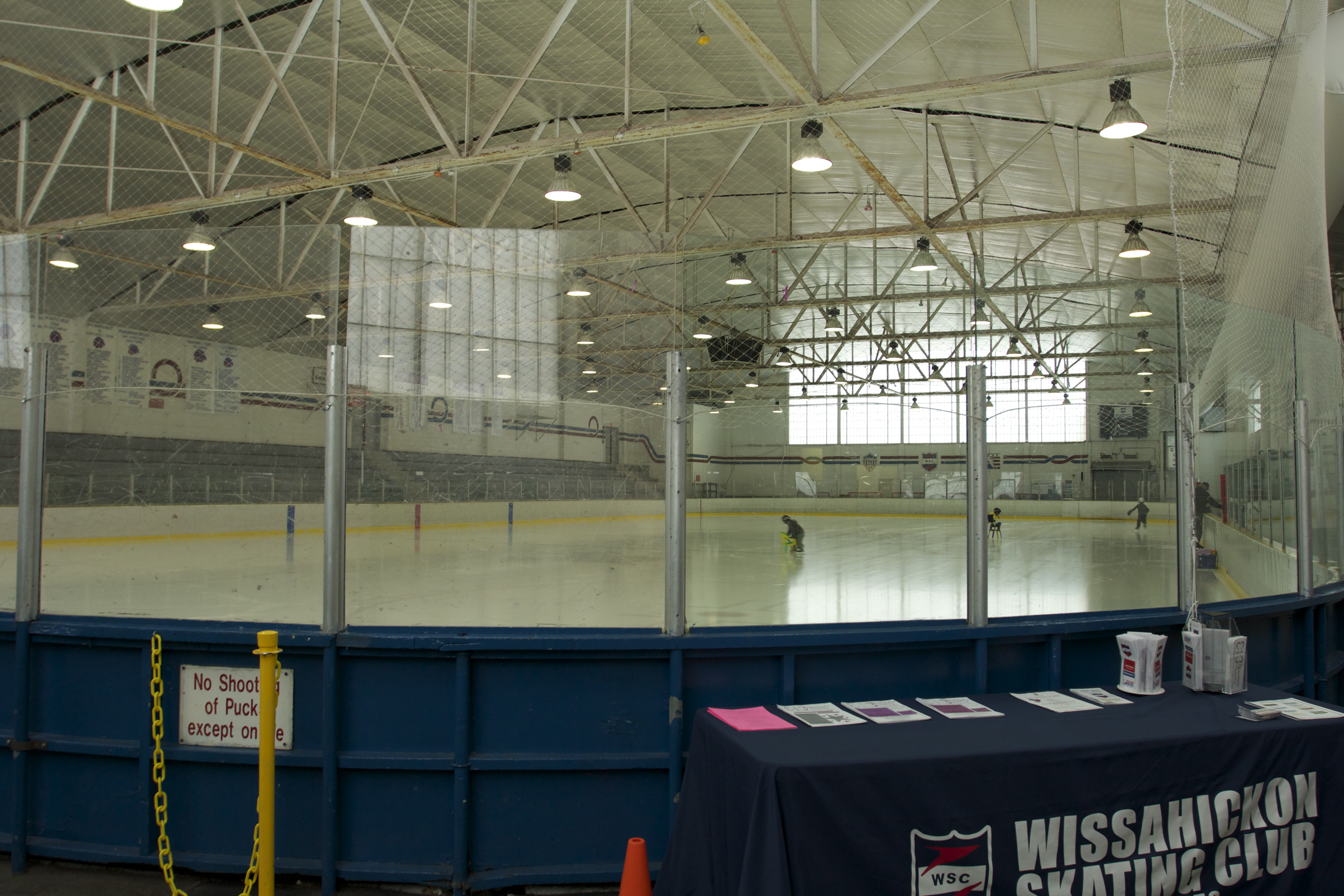
Interior of WSC

This club was organized in 1954 as a community improvement measure and for the purpose of supporting amateur and professional athletes who were eligible to participate in ice hockey and figure skating competitions.

Its planning and development were undertaken by a group of Chestnut Hill residents who solicited funds from families within and beyond the community of Chestnut Hill. Construction began in 1955, and the club's doors officially opened on October 28, 1956 with a skating exhibition that was attended by Rainier III, Prince of Monaco and his wife, Princess Grace (formerly the actress, Grace Kelly), whose niece, Meg Davis, participated in the exhibition.

Originally, the club only operated for seven months per year, but by the late 1950s, it operated year-round due to the availability of new rink cooling technology.

== Figure skating ==
Over the years, WSC developed a strong figure skating program, offering daily training to beginning, intermediate and professional-level figure skaters. Several of the club's members have competed and placed in the United States Figure Skating Association's (USFSA) South Atlantic, Eastern and National Competitions, and Scott Cramer, a two-time silver medalist in the U.S. Figure Skating Championships, and Olympic bronze medalist Adam Rippon are two of the professionals who have trained here.

In 1998, WSC hosted the U.S. National Figure Skating Championships. The club is also home to The Philadelphia Symmetry synchronized skating teams.

=== Wisscapades ===
Every two or three years, the club presents an ice show called Wisscapades. Always tied to a theme, each show has several guest stars, and is designed to showcase WSC skaters while giving the community opportunities to see high-level skaters perform.

== Ice hockey ==
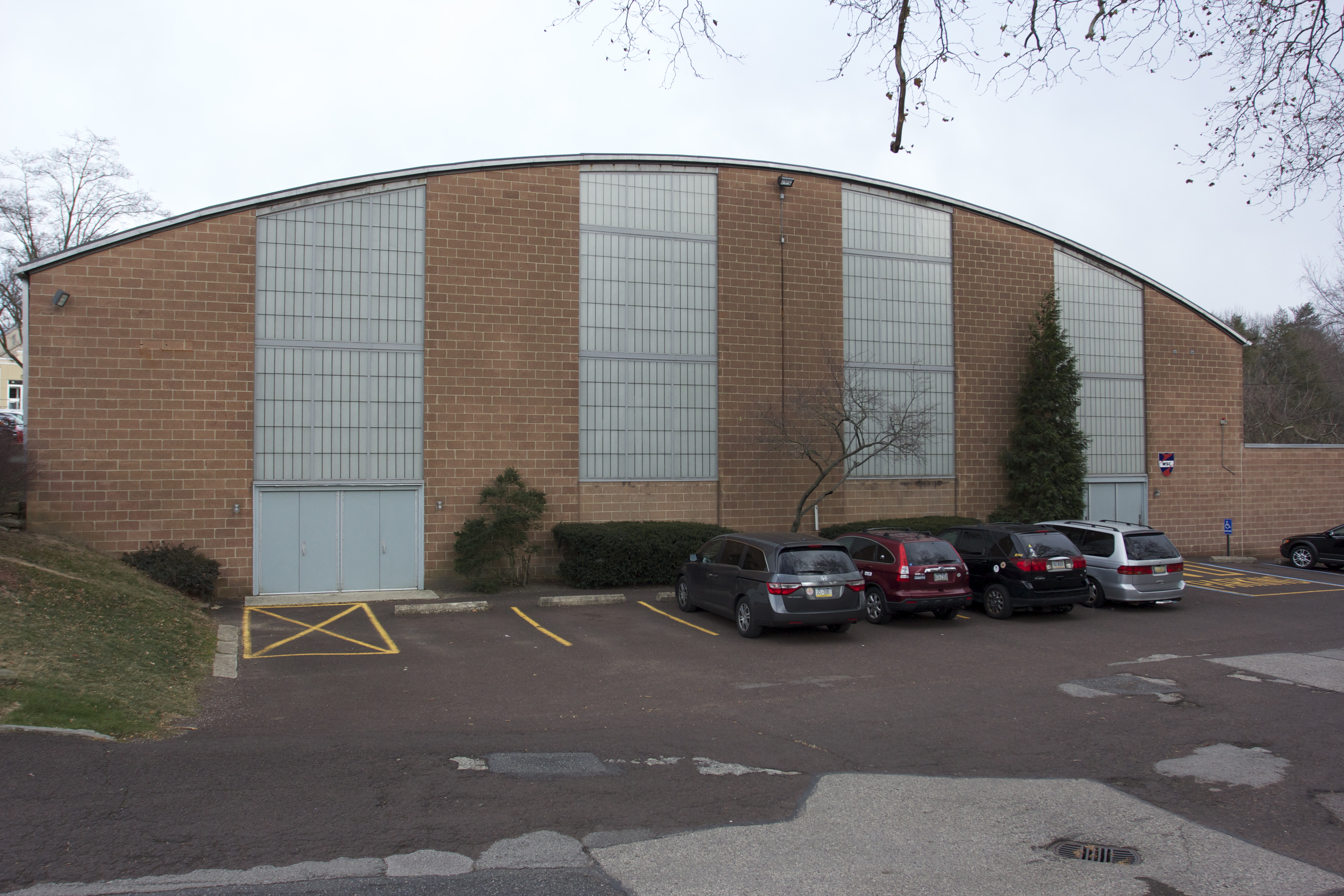
Exterior of WSC

The Wissahickon Skating Club's Youth Hockey Program is one of the longest-standing hockey programs in the greater Philadelphia area. During its early years, the club operated as an independent organization, competing against clubs similar in structure to WSC.

Throughout the 1960s, 1970s, and 1980s, the club produced many elite players, a number of whom advanced to prominent boarding schools and NCAA Division 1 hockey programs.

One of the program's best-known alumni is two-time Olympian and New York Rangers Stanley Cup Champion goaltender, Mike Richter. Brian O'Neil (Yale University ECAC, Manchester Monarch's AHL) is another.

During the early 1990s, WSC became a member of the Delaware Valley Hockey League and has since represented the DVHL and the Atlantic District at local and national championships. Typically, the club fields between ten and twelve youth hockey teams (ages six to eighteen) and four levels of senior hockey teams (nineteen and older). The Wissahickon Senior "A" team has won its competitive league three years in a row and four of the last six.

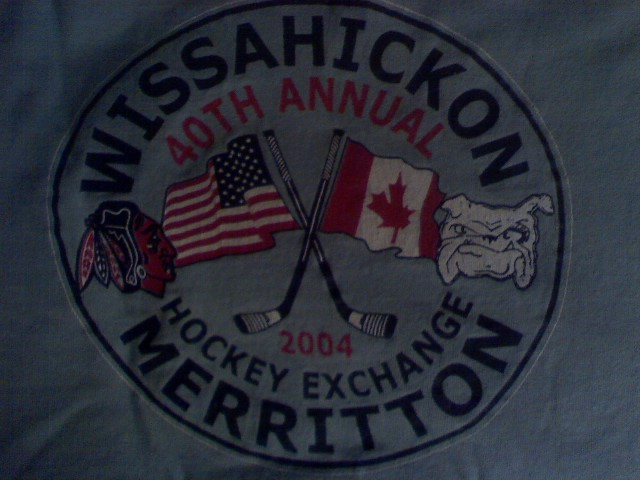
Wissahickon Merritton Logo during the 40th Annual Tournament in 2006

=== WSC vs. MAA ===
For the past fifty-three years, WSC and The Merritton Athletic Association of St. Catharines, Ontario have operated a Peewee and Bantam level exchange tournament (alternating as hosts). It is one of the oldest hockey exchanges between two clubs in North America and alternates annually between Philadelphia and Merritton. Held during President's Day weekend or Family Day weekend in Ontario, it offers a skills competition, exhibition game, and championship game at the Peewee and Bantam levels. In addition, there is an alumni game held for past participants.

== Pro shop ==
WSC has a pro shop that offers club apparel and figure skating and hockey merchandise for sale. Custom sharpening and repairs are also available.

== Public sessions ==
WSC is open for public skating every Friday night from 8:30-10:30 as well as Saturday afternoons 12:45-2:15pm. There are also additional skating slots around the holidays.

== Notable hockey players ==
- Grace Dwyer
- Brian O'Neil
- Mike Richter (U.S. Olympian and National Hockey League player)

== See also ==
- Class of 1923 Arena
- Chestnut Hill, Philadelphia, Pennsylvania
