= Robert Wagenhoffer =

American figure skater

Personal information
- Born: 5 July 1960
- Died: 13 December 1999 (aged 39) Torrance, California

Figure skating career
- Country: United States
- Retired: 1982

Robert A. Wagenhoffer (July 5, 1960 – December 13, 1999) was an American figure skater. As a single skater, he was the 1977 Nebelhorn Trophy champion, the 1980 NHK Trophy silver medalist, the 1981 Skate America silver medalist, and a two-time U.S. national medalist. Wagenhoffer also competed in pairs with Vicki Heasley, winning silver at the 1979 NHK Trophy, bronze at the 1979 Skate America, and silver at the 1979 Nationals. He retired from amateur competition in 1982, joining the Ice Capades.

Wagenhoffer died in December 1999 from complications of AIDS.

== Results ==
=== Single skating ===
International
| Event | 1975–76 | 1976–77 | 1977–78 | 1978–79 | 1979–80 | 1980–81 | 1981–82 |
|---|---|---|---|---|---|---|---|
| World Championships | | | | | | 10th | 6th |
| Skate America | | | | | | | 2nd |
| NHK Trophy | | | | | | 2nd | |
| Nebelhorn Trophy | | | 1st | | | | |
| Prague Skate | | | | 3rd | | | |
| St. Gervais | | | 1st | | | | |
National
| U.S. Championships | 7th J | 1st J | 6th | 5th | 6th | 3rd | 2nd |
J = Junior

=== Pair skating with Heasley ===
International
| Event | 1977–78 | 1978–79 | 1979–80 |
|---|---|---|---|
| World Championships | | 6th | |
| Skate America | | | 3rd |
| NHK Trophy | | | 2nd |
| Prague Skate | | 1st | |
National
| U.S. Championships | 4th | 2nd | 4th |
