= András Sallay =

Hungarian ice dancer (born 1953)

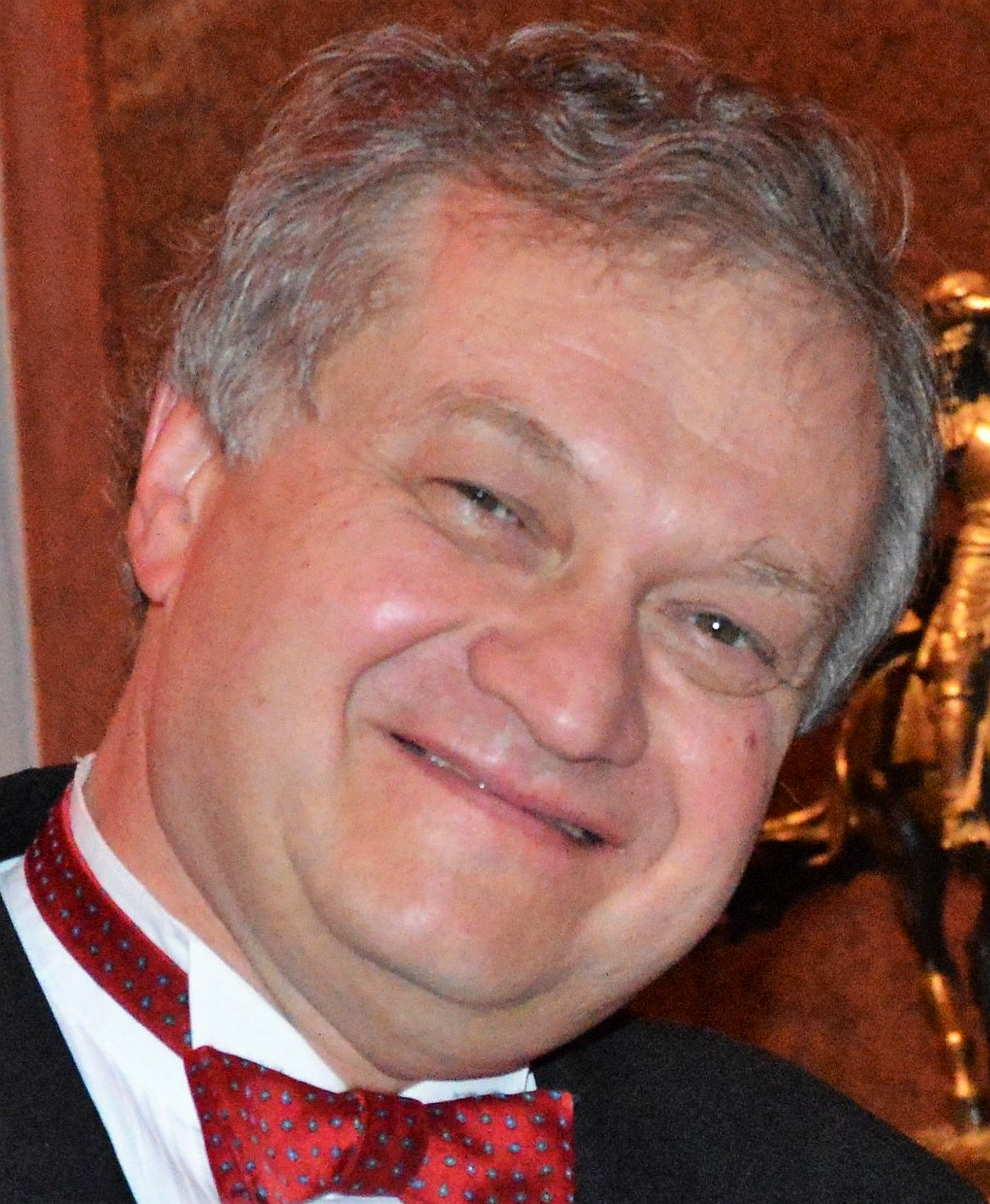
- András Sallay in 2014

Personal information
- Born: December 15, 1953 (age 72)
- Height: 6 ft 2 in (188 cm)

Figure skating career
- Country: Hungary
- Retired: 1980
Medal record
Figure skating: Ice dancing
Representing Hungary
Olympic Games
Silver medal – second place	1980 Lake Placid	Ice dancing
World Championships
Gold medal – first place	1980 Dortmund	Ice dancing
Silver medal – second place	1979 Vienna	Ice dancing
Bronze medal – third place	1978 Ottawa	Ice dancing
European Championships
Silver medal – second place	1980 Gothenburg	Ice dancing
Bronze medal – third place	1979 Zagreb	Ice dancing
Bronze medal – third place	1978 Strasbourg	Ice dancing
Silver medal – second place	1977 Helsinki	Ice dancing

András Sallay (born 15 December 1953) is a former ice dancer from Hungary. Competing with Krisztina Regőczy, he won a gold medal at the 1980 World Figure Skating Championships and a silver at that year's Winter Olympics.

Sallay is the vice president and managing director of IMG Hungary.

He has two daughters, Nóra and Laura.

== Results ==
(ice dance with Krisztina Regőczy)

International
Event	69–70	70–71	71–72	72–73	73–74	74–75	75–76	76–77	77–78	78–79	79–80
Olympics							5th				2nd
Worlds				13th	6th	6th	4th	4th	3rd	2nd	1st
Europeans	13th	14th	11th	10th	7th	6th	4th	2nd	3rd	3rd	2nd
Skate America											1st
Skate Canada										1st	
National
Hungary			1st	1st	1st	1st	1st	1st	1st	1st	1st

Awards
Preceded by Men's table tennis team	Hungarian Sportsteam of The Year (with Krisztina Regőczy); 1980	Succeeded by Men's foil team
