= Randy Gardner (figure skater) =

American figure skater

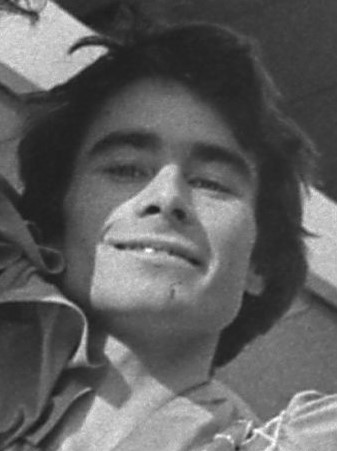
- Gardner in 1979

Personal information
- Full name: Randy Gardner
- Born: December 2, 1958 (age 67) Los Angeles, California, U.S.

Figure skating career
- Country: United States
- Skating club: Santa Monica FSC; Los Angeles FSC
- Retired: 2008
Medal record
Representing United States
Pairs' Figure skating
World Championships
Gold medal – first place	1979 Vienna	Pairs
Bronze medal – third place	1978 Ottawa	Pairs
Bronze medal – third place	1977 Tokyo	Pairs

Randy Gardner (born December 2, 1958) is an American former pair skater. Together with Tai Babilonia, he won the 1979 World Figure Skating Championships and five U.S. Figure Skating Championships (1976–1980). The pair qualified for the 1976 and 1980 Winter Olympics.

== Career ==
Babilonia and Gardner began skating together when Babilonia was eight and Gardner ten. Their first coach was Mabel Fairbanks, and began training with John Nicks in 1971. They won the gold medal as juniors at their first U.S. Nationals in 1973 and as seniors, they came in second place in 1974 and 1975. The pair became five-time U.S. national champions and won the gold medal at the 1979 World Championships. They were medal favorites at the 1980 Winter Olympics but were forced to withdraw due to a thigh injury to Gardner, which ended their competitive careers.

Babilonia and Gardner toured with the Ice Capades for four years and with Champions on Ice for two years. They performed in many ice shows and competed professionally, earning first place in the World Professional Championships in 1985.

In 2006, Gardner appeared as a choreographer on the reality television series Skating with Celebrities. In 2008, he indicated that he was working on his autobiography which was to be released at the end of the year. It has not been released. In 2008, Babilonia and Gardner announced their retirement from show skating due to a neck injury sustained by Gardner and their advancing ages.

== Personal life ==
Gardner discovered in 1998 that he was adopted after a relative divulged the family secret. After a five-year search, he found his birth mother who had become pregnant with him at age 17 after being raped by a family friend. In 2006, Gardner revealed that he is gay.

== Competitive highlights ==
(with Babilonia)

Event	1973–74	1974–75	1975–76	1976–77	1977–78	1978–79	1979–80
Winter Olympic Games			5th				WD
World Championships	10th	10th	5th	3rd	3rd	1st	
U.S. Championships	2nd	2nd	1st	1st	1st	1st	1st
Nebelhorn Trophy	1st						
Coupe des Alpes	3rd						
WD = Withdrew

(Men's singles)

Event	1973–74	1974–75	1975–76
U.S. Championships	1st J	8th	6th
J=Junior
