= Dagmar Lurz =

German figure skater

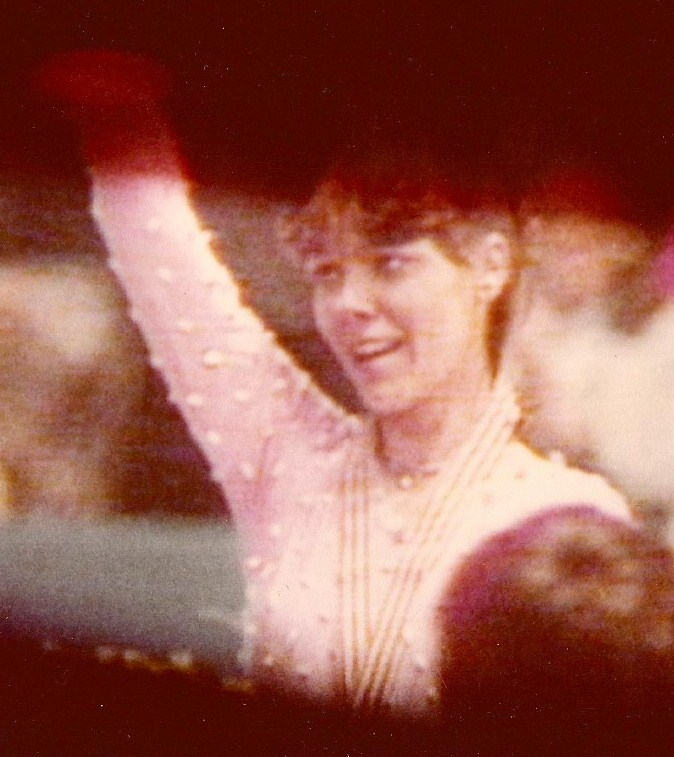
- Lurz at the 1980 World Championships

Personal information
- Born: 18 January 1959 (age 67) Dortmund, West Germany

Figure skating career
- Country: West Germany
- Retired: 1980
Medal record
Figure skating: Ladies' singles
Representing West Germany
Winter Olympics
| Bronze medal – third place | 1980 Lake Placid | Ladies' singles |
World Championships
| Silver medal – second place | 1980 Dortmund | Ladies' singles |
| Bronze medal – third place | 1977 Tokyo | Ladies' singles |
European Championships
| Silver medal – second place | 1980 Gothenburg | Ladies' singles |
| Silver medal – second place | 1979 Zagreb | Ladies' singles |
| Silver medal – second place | 1978 Strasbourg | Ladies' singles |
| Silver medal – second place | 1977 Helsinki | Ladies' singles |

Dagmar Lurz (born 18 January 1959) is a German former figure skater. She is the 1980 Olympic bronze medalist, the 1980 World silver medalist, and a four-time European silver medalist (1977–80).

== Personal life ==
Dagmar Lurz was born 18 January 1959 in Dortmund, West Germany. She studied medicine at the university in Cologne.

== Career ==
Lurz trained in Oberstdorf under the guidance of her coach, Erich Zeller. Her main international rivals were Anett Pötzsch, Linda Fratianne, and Emi Watanabe. Like Pötzsch, Lurz was known primarily for her strong compulsory figures, usually placing slightly behind Pötzsch in figures at most major competitions between 1977 and 1980.

Lurz was able to complete two different triple jumps, the Salchow and loop, making her technically competitive with other skaters such as Pötzsch and Fratianne. However, even with successfully completed triple jumps, she typically placed significantly lower in the short program and free skating segments due to low presentation scores.

Her most successful year came in 1980, when she won the silver medals at the Europeans and the Worlds behind Pötzsch and the bronze medal at the Winter Olympics behind Pötzsch and Fratianne. These results were highly controversial, given Lurz's short program and free skating performances at these competitions.

Lurz is now an ISU Judge and Referee for Germany. She serves as a physician for the German team.

== Results ==
International
| Event | 71–72 | 72–73 | 73–74 | 74–75 | 75–76 | 76–77 | 77–78 | 78–79 | 79–80 |
|---|---|---|---|---|---|---|---|---|---|
| Winter Olympics | | | | | 10th | | | | 3rd |
| World Champ. | | | | 17th | 9th | 3rd | 4th | 4th | 2nd |
| European Champ. | | | | 8th | 6th | 2nd | 2nd | 2nd | 2nd |
| Nebelhorn Trophy | | | | | 3rd | | | | |
National
| German Champ. | 5th | 3rd | | 3rd | 3rd | 1st | 1st | 1st | 1st |
