= Krisztina Regőczy =

Hungarian ice dancer (born 1955)

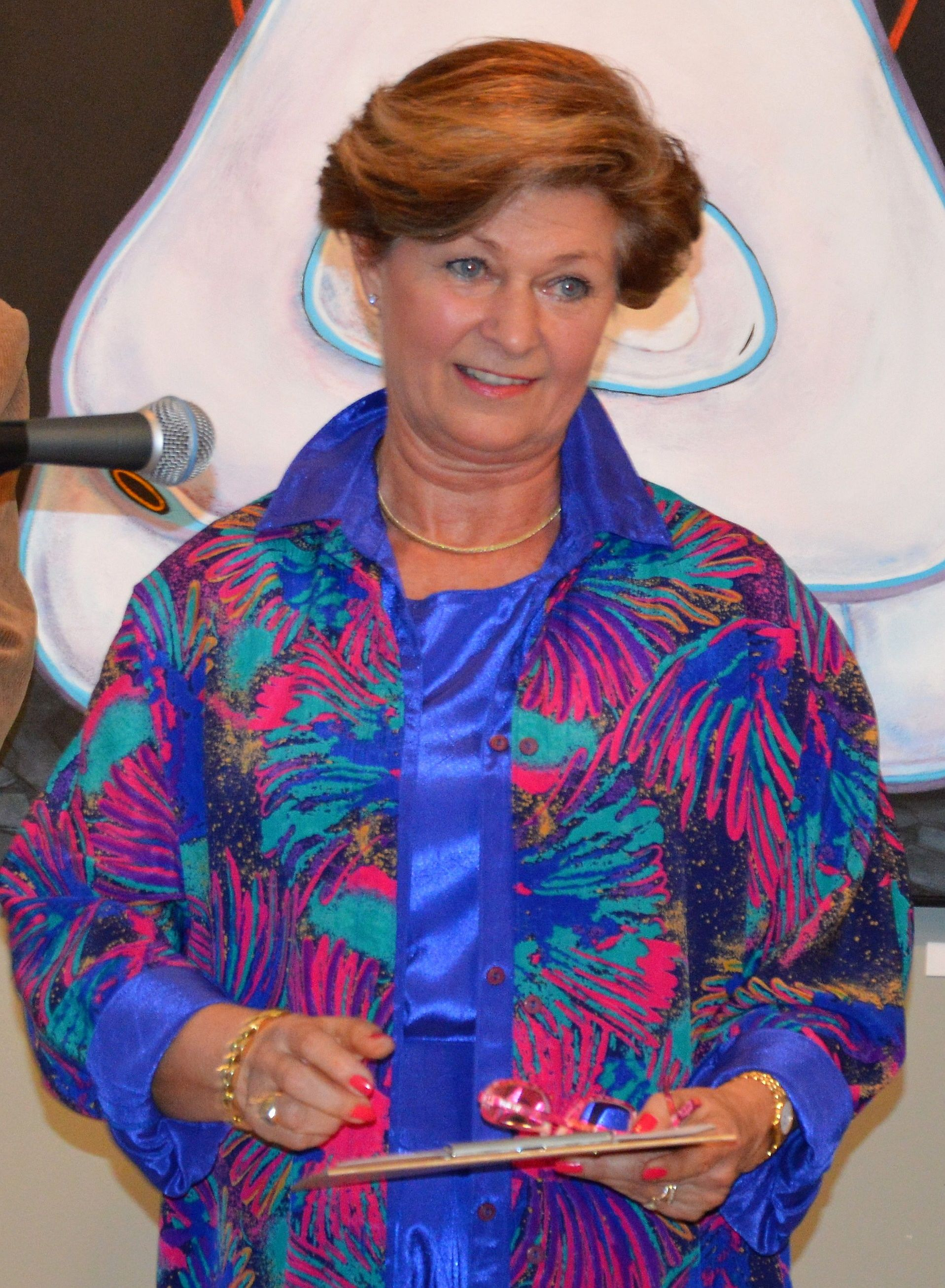
- Regőczy in 2014

Personal information
- Born: 19 April 1955 (age 71)
- Height: 162 cm (5 ft 4 in)

Figure skating career
- Country: Hungary
- Retired: 1980
Medal record
Figure skating: Ice dancing
Representing Hungary
Olympic Games
Silver medal – second place	1980 Lake Placid	Ice dancing
World Championships
Gold medal – first place	1980 Dortmund	Ice dancing
Silver medal – second place	1979 Vienna	Ice dancing
Bronze medal – third place	1978 Ottawa	Ice dancing
European Championships
Silver medal – second place	1980 Gothenburg	Ice dancing
Bronze medal – third place	1979 Zagreb	Ice dancing
Bronze medal – third place	1978 Strasbourg	Ice dancing
Silver medal – second place	1977 Helsinki	Ice dancing

Krisztina Regőczy (born 19 April 1955) is a former ice dancer from Hungary. Competing with András Sallay, she won the gold medal at the 1980 World Figure Skating Championships and the silver at that year's Winter Olympics. Regőczy coached in the United States for a number of years before returning to Budapest. She is the figure skating sports director for the International Skating Union.

== Results ==
(ice dance with András Sallay)

International
Event	69–70	70–71	71–72	72–73	73–74	74–75	75–76	76–77	77–78	78–79	79–80
Olympics							5th				2nd
Worlds				13th	6th	6th	4th	4th	3rd	2nd	1st
Europeans	13th	14th	11th	10th	7th	6th	4th	2nd	3rd	3rd	2nd
Skate America											1st
Skate Canada										1st	
National
Hungary			1st	1st	1st	1st	1st	1st	1st	1st	1st

= == =
Awards
Preceded by Men's table tennis team	Hungarian Sportsteam of The Year (with András Sallay); 1980	Succeeded by Men's foil team
