= Scott Cramer =

American figure skater (born 1958)

Personal information
- Born: August 18, 1958 (age 67) Rochester, New York, U.S.
- Home town: Colorado Springs, Colorado, U.S.
- Height: 5 ft 9 in (175 cm)

Figure skating career
- Country: United States
- Discipline: Men's singles
- Coach: Pieter Kollen; Albert Edmonds
- Skating club: Broadmoor Skating Club; Wissahickon Skating Club

Scott Cramer (born August 18, 1958) is an American former competitive figure skater. He is the 1976 Prague Skate champion, 1979 Ennia Challenge Cup champion, 1979 Skate America silver medalist, and a two-time U.S. national silver medalist.

== Life and career ==
Cramer was born in Rochester, New York. His coaches were Pieter Kollen and Albert Edmonds. He won four national medals – bronze in 1976, silver in 1977 and 1979, and pewter in 1980. Internationally, he won gold at the 1976 Prague Skate, bronze at the 1977 Skate Canada International, gold at the 1979 Ennia Challenge Cup, and silver at the 1979 Skate America. He placed ninth at the 1977 World Championships in Tokyo and fifth at the 1979 World Championships in Vienna.

After leaving amateur competition, Cramer won gold at the 1980 World Professional Championships in Jaca, Spain, and at the 1981 U.S. Professional Championships in Philadelphia.

Cramer retired from skating at the age of 21 to pursue a career in chiropractic medicine. After graduating cum laude from the University of Southern California with a bachelor's degree in exercise science, Cramer received his doctorate in chiropractic after eight years of higher education, graduating magna cum laude from Los Angeles College of Chiropractic. He then spent an additional four years in orthopedic residency and became a board-certified chiropractic orthopedist. Cramer also specializes in acupuncture after rigorous training. He has one son and two daughters with his wife Joanie Kuhn.

== Results ==
International
Event	70–71	71–72	72–73	73-74	74–75	75–76	76–77	77–78	78–79	79–80
World Champ.							9th		5th	
Skate America										2nd
Skate Canada								3rd		
Ennia Challenge Cup									1st	
Prague Skate							1st			
National
U.S. Championships	3rd J	2nd J	2nd J	6th	7th	3rd	2nd	4th	2nd	4th
U.S. Olympic Festival									1st	
Midwestern Sectionals						1st				
Eastern Sectionals				1st						
J = Junior
