= Tai Babilonia =

American pair skater

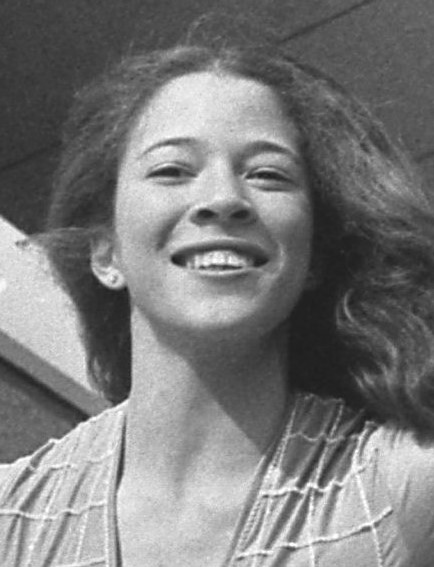
- Babilonia in 1979

Personal information
- Full name: Tai Babilonia
- Born: September 22, 1959 (age 66) Los Angeles, California, U.S.
- Height: 5 ft 3 in (1.59 m)

Figure skating career
- Country: United States
- Skating club: Los Angeles FSC
- Retired: 1980
Medal record
Pairs' figure skating
Representing United States
World Championships
| Gold medal – first place | 1979 Vienna | Pairs |
| Bronze medal – third place | 1978 Ottawa | Pairs |
| Bronze medal – third place | 1977 Tokyo | Pairs |

Tai Reina Babilonia (born September 22, 1959) is an American pair skater. Together with Randy Gardner, she won the 1979 World Figure Skating Championships and five U.S. Figure Skating Championships (1976–1980). The pair qualified for the 1976 and 1980 Winter Olympics.

== Career ==
Babilonia and Gardner began skating together at eight and ten years old when skating coach Mabel Fairbanks needed a young pair team for a skating show in Culver City, California. They began training with John Nicks in 1971. They won the gold medal as juniors at their first U.S. Nationals in 1973 and as seniors, they came in second place in 1974 and 1975. The pair became five-time U.S. National champions, between 1978 and 1980, and won the gold medal at the 1979 World Championships. They were medal favorites at the 1980 Winter Olympics but were forced to withdraw due to an injury to Gardner, which ended their competitive careers.

Babilonia was the first African American figure skater to compete for the United States at an Olympics and win a world title. She is also part Filipino on her father's side and part Native American.

Babilonia and Gardner toured with the Ice Capades for four years and with Champions on Ice for two years. They performed in many ice shows and competed professionally, earning first place in the World Professional Championships in 1985.

In 1990, a biographical film of her rise to fame was aired on television, On Thin Ice: The Tai Babilonia Story.

Babilonia appeared in the 2006 Fox television program Skating with Celebrities, partnered with Olympic decathlon gold medalist Caitlyn Jenner.

Babilonia and Gardner also appeared on an episode of Hart to Hart "Silent Dance" (season 5 episode 16) in 1984.

Babilonia and Gardner also appeared in an episode of Diagnosis Murder, "Murder on Thin Ice" (season 4 episode 3).

== Personal life ==
Babilonia was inspired at the age of six to begin ice skating after watching Peggy Fleming on television. Babilonia has a son named Scout with former husband Cary Butler. She was engaged in 2005 to actor and comedian David Brenner, but they never married before their breakup in 2011.

== Competitive highlights ==
(with Gardner)

| Event | 1973–74 | 1974–75 | 1975–76 | 1976–77 | 1977–78 | 1978–79 | 1979–80 |
|---|---|---|---|---|---|---|---|
| Winter Olympic Games | | | 5th | | | | WD |
| World Championships | 10th | 10th | 5th | 3rd | 3rd | 1st | |
| U.S. Championships | 2nd | 2nd | 1st | 1st | 1st | 1st | 1st |
| Nebelhorn Trophy | 1st | | | | | | |
| Coupe des Alpes | 3rd | | | | | | |
WD = Withdrew
