= Emi Watanabe =

Japanese figure skater

Personal information
- Full name: Emi Catherine Watanabe
- Born: August 27, 1959 (age 67) Tokyo, Japan
- Height: 1.52 m (5 ft 0 in)

Figure skating career
- Country: Japan
- Retired: June 23, 1980
Medal record
Representing Japan
Ladies' Figure skating
World Championships
Bronze medal – third place	1979 Vienna	Ladies' singles

Japanese name
- Kanji: 渡部絵美
- Kana: わたなべ えみ
Transcriptions
- Romanization: Watanabe Emi

Emi Catherine Watanabe (渡部 絵美, Watanabe Emi; born August 27, 1959), is a Japanese former competitive figure skater who is the 1979 World bronze medalist and an eight-time Japanese national champion. She was the first skater to medal for Japan in ladies' singles at the World Championships.

== Personal life ==
Watanabe's mother is Filipino, and her father is Japanese. She graduated from Golden Valley High School in Minnesota.

=== Marriage ===
She married a man nine years older than her who was an Olympic ice hockey representative in 1989. They had a son in 1991, but later divorced in 1992. Watanabe had custody of the child and raised her son alone for 30 years without financial support.

Watabe remarried in September 2020 to a man six years her junior. According to reports, the man is an employee of a broadcasting company.

== Skating career ==
In the 1972–73 season, Watanabe won Japanese national titles on both the junior and senior levels. She then made her World Championship debut, finishing 17th.

In the 1975–76 season, she took bronze at the 1975 Skate Canada International and then won her fourth national title. She was assigned to the 1976 Winter Olympics and finished 13th. She was 17th in her final event of the season, the 1976 World Championships.

She broke into the World top ten at the 1978 World Championships, placing 8th. The next season, she won the bronze medal at 1979 Worlds, becoming the first Japanese woman to medal at the event.

In her final competitive season, Watanabe won gold at the 1979 NHK Trophy and then won her eighth national title. She placed 6th at the 1980 Winter Olympics. She ended her competitive career at the 1980 World Championships, where she placed 4th.

== Later career ==
After retiring from competitive skating, Watanabe went into show business and helped to popularize figure skating in Japan while becoming a national celebrity through her numerous appearances on television and in magazines and newspapers. She continues to run figure skating camps in Japan and currently hosts a podcast on TBS radio.

Watanabe ran for The House of Councilors election in 2001 from Liberal League, but lost.

== Results ==
International
Event	72–73	73–74	74–75	75–76	76–77	77–78	78–79	79–80
Winter Olympics				13th				6th
World Champ.	17th	15th	13th	17th	12th	8th	3rd	4th
Skate Canada				3rd				
NHK Trophy								1st
National
Japan Champ.	1st	1st	1st	1st	1st	1st	1st	1st
Japan Jr. Champ.	1st							
