= Henriette Fröschl =

German ice dancer

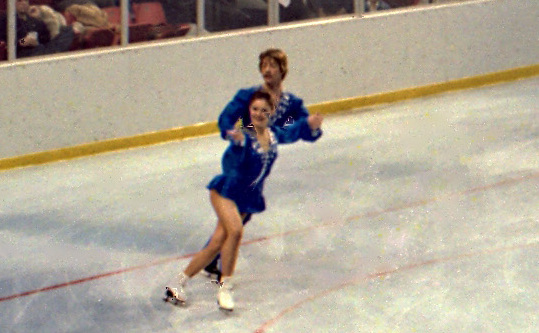
- Henriette Fröschl and Christian Steiner at the 1980 Winter Olympics

Personal information
- Nationality: German
- Born: 14 August 1959 (age 65); Munich, West Germany

Sport
- Sport: Figure skating

Henriette Fröschl (born 14 August 1959) is a German ice dancer. She competed in the ice dance event at the 1980 Winter Olympics.
