= Linda Fratianne =

American figure skater

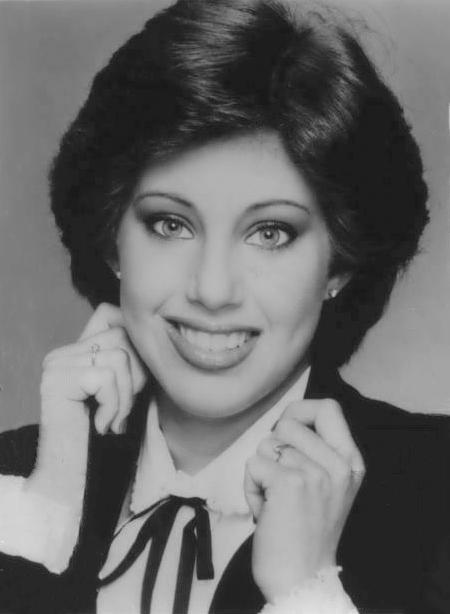
- Fratianne in 1979

Personal information
- Born: August 2, 1960 (age 66) Northridge, California, U.S.
- Height: 153 cm (5 ft 0 in)

Figure skating career
- Country: United States
- Skating club: LAFSC
- Retired: 1980
Medal record
Women's figure skating
Representing the United States
Olympic Games
Silver medal – second place	1980 Lake Placid	Singles
World Championships
Gold medal – first place	1977 Tokyo	Singles
Gold medal – first place	1979 Vienna	Singles
Silver medal – second place	1978 Ottawa	Singles
Bronze medal – third place	1980 Dortmund	Singles

Linda Sue Fratianne (born August 2, 1960) is an American former figure skater known for winning two world-championship titles (1977, 1979), four consecutive U.S. championships (1977–1980) and a silver medal in the 1980 Winter Olympics.

== Career ==
Throughout her figure-skating career, Fratianne was coached by Frank Carroll.

Fratianne became the first female skater to land two different types of triple jumps (toe loop and Salchow) in her free-skating programs in 1976 at the U.S. National Championships, finishing in second place. The next year, Fratianne won the gold medal.

At the World Figure Skating Championships in Tokyo in 1977, Fratianne won her first world title by upsetting the favorite, Anett Pötzsch of East Germany, despite having fallen following a triple-Salchow jump in her free-skating routine. After losing to Pötzsch at the 1978 World Championships in Ottawa, Canada, where she finished second, Fratianne regained her world title in 1979 in Vienna, Austria.

Fratianne's chief rivals were Pötzsch (East Germany), Emi Watanabe (Japan) and Dagmar Lurz (West Germany). Her compulsory figures were considered to be significantly weaker than her free skating; consequently, she frequently placed well below Pötzsch and Lurz in the compulsories and compensated with strong short and free programs. In the short and free programs, Fratianne never placed lower than Pötzsch or Lurz between 1977 and 1980 in any competition. However, as the rules at the time placed much weight on compulsory figures, she only won a major title twice.

At the 1980 Winter Olympics, Fratianne placed third in the compulsory figures, first in the short program, and second in the free skate to place second overall, while Pötzsch took the gold with first in figures, fourth in the short program and third in the free skate. Fratianne and others have implied that she was robbed of the gold medal by political voting among Eastern-bloc judges, but in fact only two of the nine judges on the panel were from Eastern-bloc countries, and only the judges from Japan and the U.S. placed Fratianne first. All others placed Pötzsch first, mainly because of her substantial lead in the compulsory figures.

Judging
	Anett Pötzsch			Linda Fratianne		
Compulsory Figures	46.04 points	9 places	1st rank	42.76 points	27 places	3rd rank
Short Program	39.76 points	37 places	4th rank	41.44 points	11 places	1st rank
Free Program	103.20 points	24 places	3rd rank	104.10 points	17 places	2nd rank
Total	189.00 points	11 places	1st rank	188.30 points	16 places	2nd rank

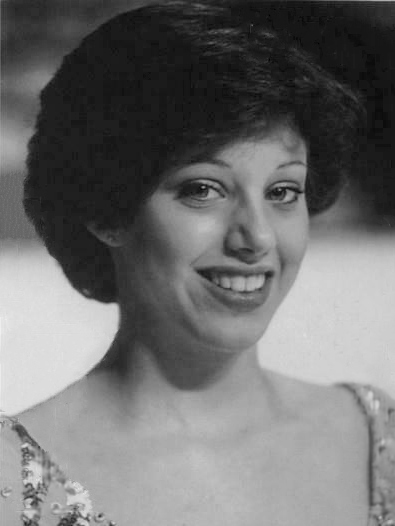
Fratianne in 1980

After the 1980 Winter Games, Fratianne competed at the 1980 World Figure Skating Championships in Dortmund, West Germany, where she won the bronze medal behind her rivals Pötzsch and Lurz from West Germany.

In 1981, the scoring system used in figure skating was modified to combine the results of the compulsory figures, short program and free skating by adding placements instead of employing raw scores. This lessened the capability of skaters to accumulate large leads in the compulsory figures.

After the 1980 season, Fratianne retired from competitive skating and performed in touring shows, including ten years as a lead skater of Disney on Ice. In 1993, she was inducted into the United States Figure Skating Hall of Fame.

Fratianne was known for "cementing the importance of triple jumps in [women's] skating." She also popularized simple but elaborate ornamentation and the use of sequins on skating costumes.

== Personal life ==
Fratianne was married to ski racer Nick Maricich.

== Results ==
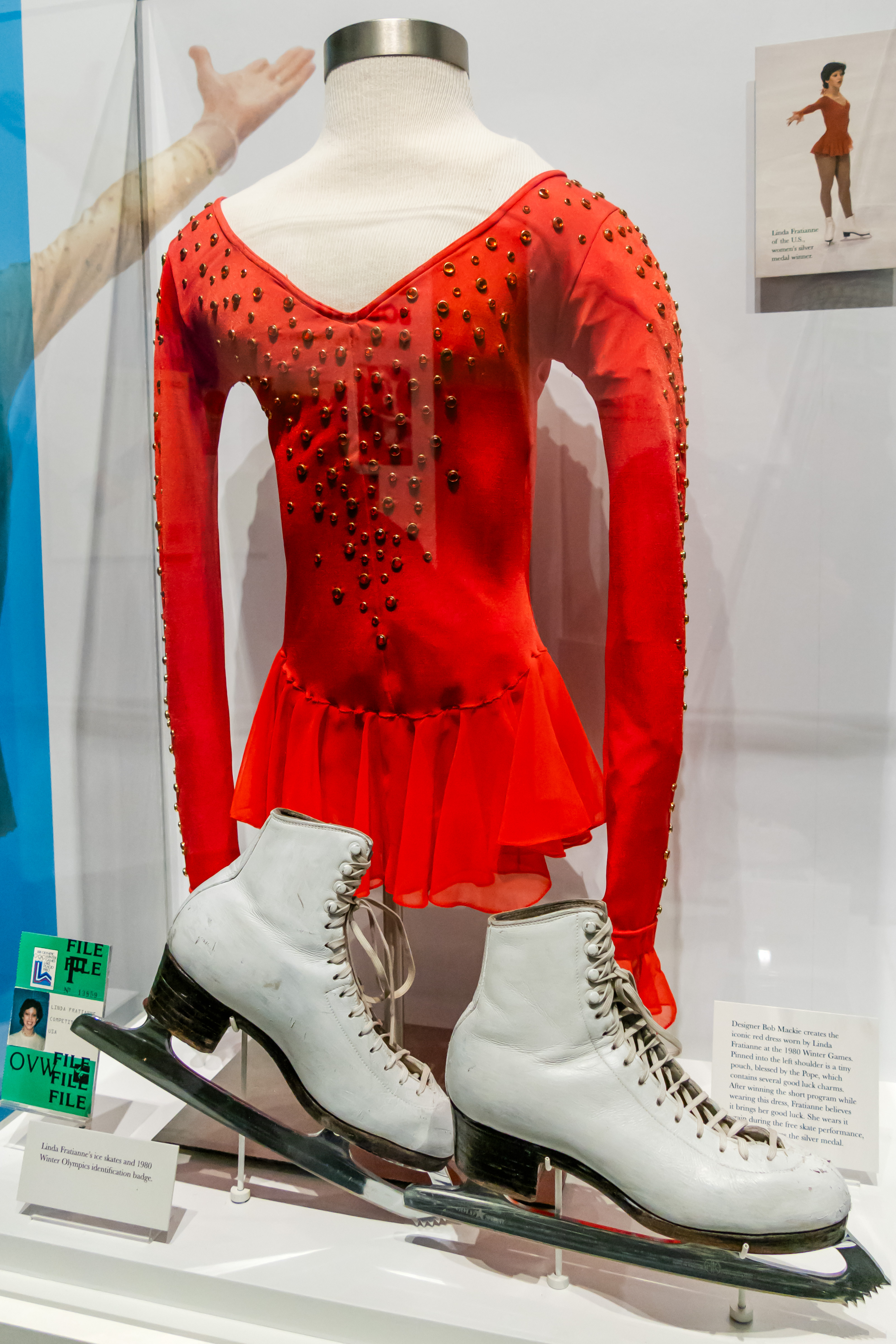
Fratianne's skates and 1980 Olympic costume on display at the Lake Placid Winter Olympic Museum

International
Event	72-73	73-74	74–75	75–76	76–77	77–78	78–79	79–80
Winter Olympics				8th				2nd
World Championships				5th	1st	2nd	1st	3rd
Skate Canada						1st		
NHK Trophy		2nd						
Richmond Trophy				3rd				
St. Ivel International							1st	
St. Gervais		1st						
Nebelhorn Trophy		2nd						
National
U.S. Championships	2nd J		7th	2nd	1st	1st	1st	1st
