= Christian Steiner (ice dancer) =

German ice dancer (1960–2025)

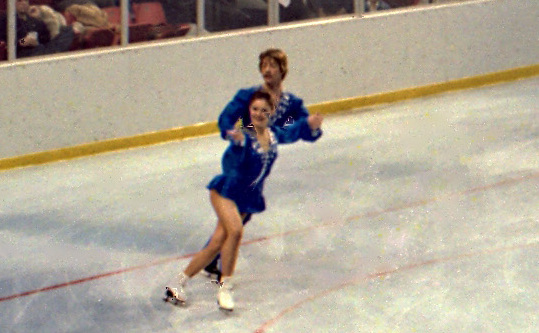
- Steiner and Henriette Fröschl at the 1980 Winter Olympics

Personal information
- Nationality: German
- Born: 26 November 1960; Munich, Bavaria, West Germany
- Died: 1 February 2025 (aged 64); Munich, Bavaria, Germany

Sport
- Sport: Figure skating

Christian Steiner (26 November 1960 – 1 February 2025) was a German ice dancer. He competed in the ice dance event at the 1980 Winter Olympics.

Steiner died on 1 February 2025, at the age of 64.
