= Stacey Smith (figure skater) =

American ice dancer

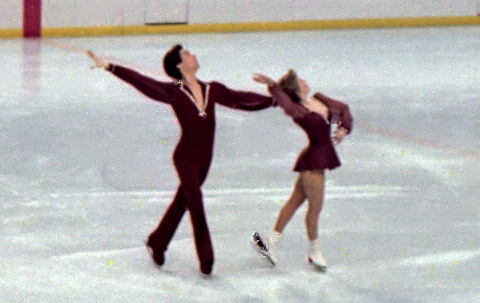
- Stacey Smith and John Summers performing their free dance at the 1980 Olympics

Personal information
- Full name: Stacey Lee Smith
- Born: April 3, 1954 (age 72) Delaware, Ohio, U.S.

Figure skating career
- Country: United States
- Partner: John Summers
- Skating club: SC of Wilmington

Stacey Lee Smith (born April 3, 1954) is an American psychiatrist and former champion ice dancer. With partner John Summers, she won the 1978–1980 United States Figure Skating Championships held by the U.S. Figure Skating organization. She and Summers represented the United States at the 1980 Winter Olympics, where they placed 9th. She received a bachelor's degree and an M.D. at Northwestern University, completed her residency at Washington University in St. Louis, and currently practices psychiatry.

== Competitive highlights ==
(with Frank Recco)

| Event | 1972 |
|---|---|
| U.S. Championships | 8th J. |

(with John Summers)

| Event | 1976–77 | 1977–78 | 1978–79 | 1979–80 |
|---|---|---|---|---|
| Winter Olympic Games | | | | 9th |
| World Championships | | 9th | 9th | 8th |
| U.S. Championships | 4th | 1st | 1st | 1st |
| NHK Trophy | | | | 4th |
