= Sandy Lenz =

American figure skater

Personal information
- Born: June 10, 1960 (age 66) Rockford, Illinois

Figure skating career
- Country: United States
- Coach: Evy Scotvold, Mary Scotvold
- Retired: 1981

Sandra J. "Sandy" Lenz-Jackson (born June 10, 1960, in Rockford, Illinois) is an American former figure skater. She won the bronze medal at the 1980 U.S. Figure Skating Championships and competed at that year's Winter Olympics. She was also the 1977 U.S. junior champion.

Lenz was not selected to compete at the 1980 World Championships, but she continued to compete and won the St. Ivel International in England in the fall of 1980. She then retired in 1981 due to injuries. She was coached by Evy and Mary Scotvold.

Lenz has worked as a skating coach. In August 2015, she won the silver medal at the inaugural World Figure Championships (losing the title on a tie-break).

== Results ==
International
Event	1977–78	1978–79	1979–80	1980–81
Winter Olympics			9th	
Skate America			3rd	
NHK Trophy			3rd	
St. Ivel				1st
Nebelhorn Trophy	2nd			
National
U.S. Championships			3rd	
