= John Summers (figure skater) =

American ice dancer

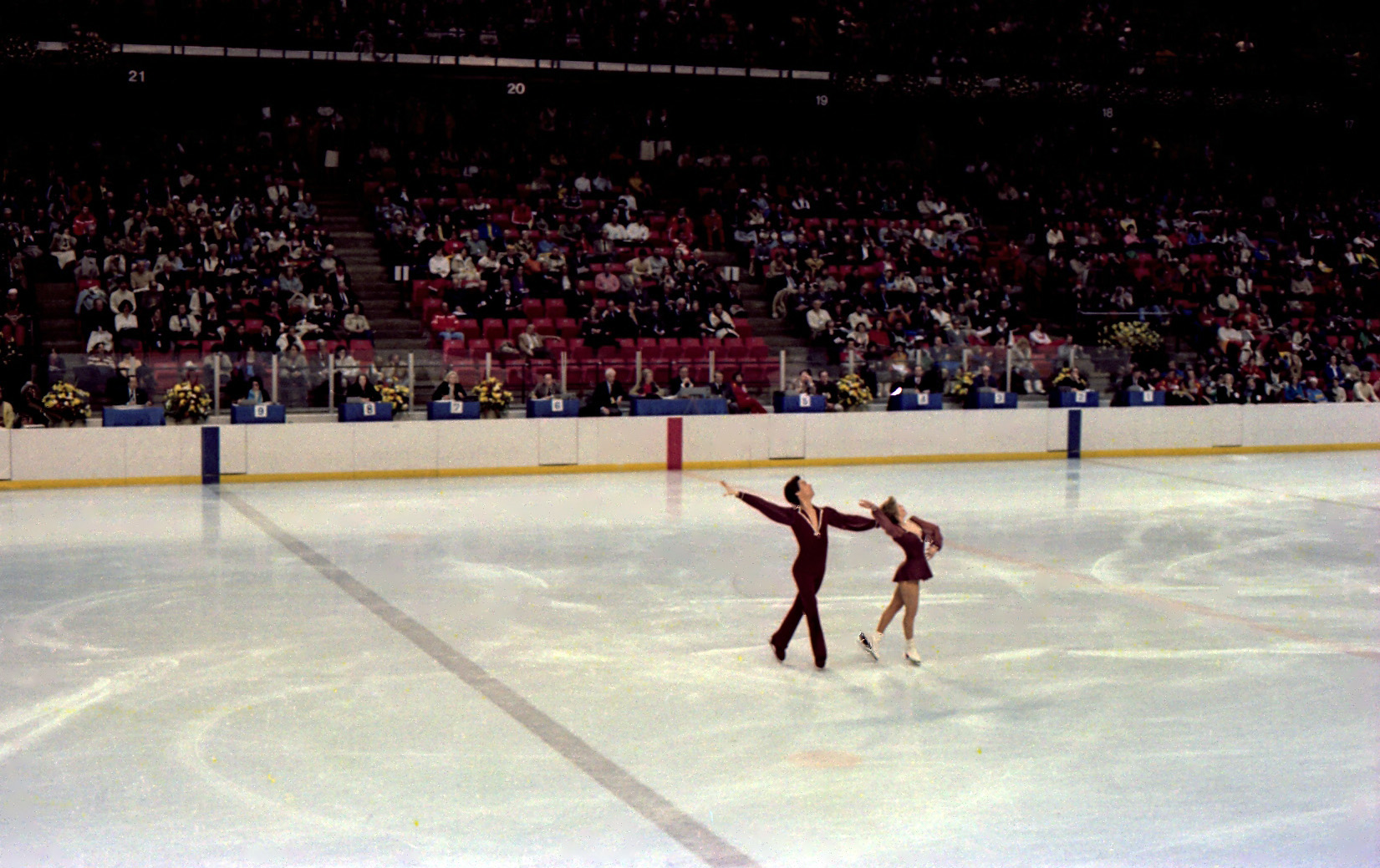
- Stacey Smith and John Summers perform during the ice dancing free dance at the 1980 Lake Placid Olympics.

Personal information
- Full name: John Frederick Summers
- Born: April 4, 1957 (age 69) Bethesda, Maryland
- Height: 5 ft 11 in (1.80 m)

Figure skating career
- Country: United States
- Partner: Stacey Smith
- Skating club: SC of Wilmington

John F. Summers (born April 4, 1957) is an American former competitive ice dancer. With partner Stacey Smith, he was the 1978–1980 U.S. national champion. They represented the United States at the 1980 Winter Olympics where they placed 9th. He graduated from the University of Pennsylvania with a M.S.E. in Computer Science. He is currently a Vice President at Akamai Technologies where he is General Manager of Enterprise Products.

John has 2 brothers (Frank, Stephen) and 3 sisters (Ann, June, and Paula).

== Competitive highlight ==
(with Smith)

Event	1976–77	1977–78	1978–79	1979–80
Winter Olympic Games				9th
World Championships		9th	9th	8th
U.S. Championships	4th	1st	1st	1st
NHK Trophy				4th
