= Lisa-Marie Allen =

American figure skater (born 1960)

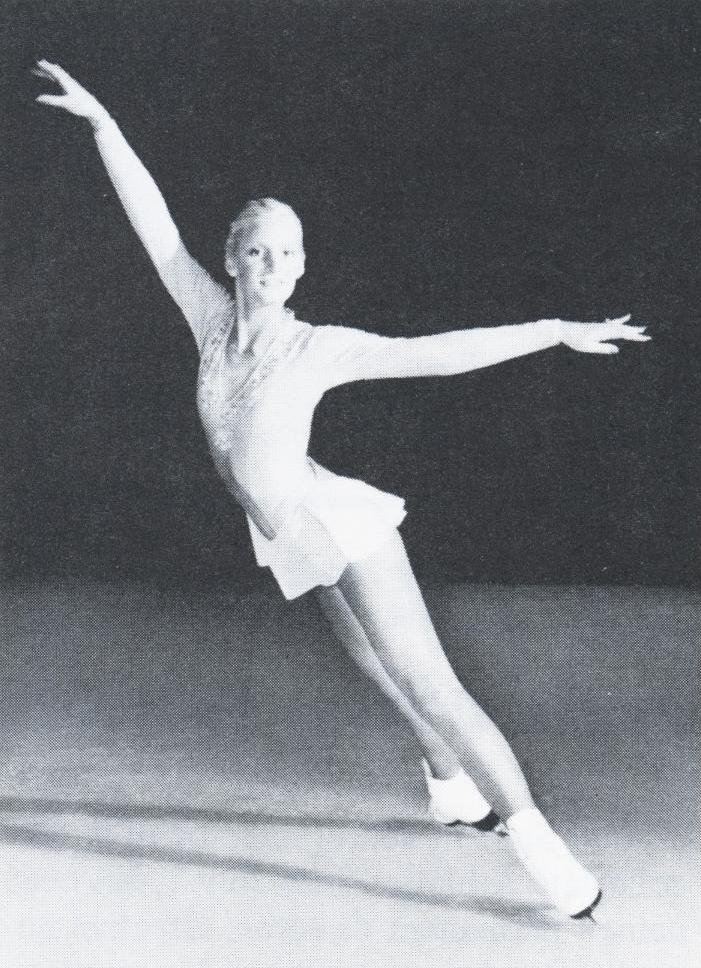
- Allen circa 1980
- Born: September 16, 1960 (age 65); Glendale, California, U.S.
- Occupation: Figure skater

Lisa-Marie Allen (born September 16, 1960 in Glendale, California) is an American former figure skater. In 1979, she won gold at the inaugural Skate America (then titled Norton Skate). She is also the 1978 Skate Canada International champion, 1975 Nebelhorn Trophy champion, 1979 NHK Trophy Silver Medalist, and a four-time U.S. national medalist (three silver, one bronze). She competed at the 1980 Winter Olympics, placing fifth.

After retiring from amateur competition, Allen became the World Professional champion in 1990 and American Open Professional champion in 1997. She was the assistant choreographer for the feature film Blades of Glory (as well as making a cameo appearance) and assistant choreographer for the opening and closing ceremonies of the Salt Lake Olympic Games.

== Results ==
International
Event	75–76	76–77	77–78	78–79	79–80	80–81
Winter Olympics					5th	
World Champ.			7th	6th	7th	
NHK Trophy					2nd	
Skate America					1st	
Skate Canada			2nd	1st		
Nebelhorn Trophy	1st					
Prague Skate		2nd				
National
U.S. Championships			2nd	2nd	2nd	3rd
