= Lorna Wighton =

Canadian ice dancer

Lorna Wighton (born June 2, 1958 in Toronto, Ontario) is a Canadian former ice dancer. With partner John Dowding, she won three gold medals at the Canadian Figure Skating Championships and finished sixth at the 1980 Winter Olympics.

== Results ==
(with John Dowding)

Event	1974-75	1975-76	1976-77	1977-78	1978-79	1979-80
Winter Olympic Games						6th
World Championships			10th	6th	6th	5th
Canadian Championships	4th	3rd	2nd	1st	1st	1st
Skate America						3rd
Skate Canada International		8th	6th	3rd	2nd	
Nebelhorn Trophy		1st				
