= John Dowding (figure skater) =

Canadian ice dancer

John Dowding (born April 27, 1957 in Oakville, Ontario) is a Canadian former ice dancer. With partner Lorna Wighton, he won three gold medals at the Canadian Figure Skating Championships and finished sixth at the 1980 Winter Olympics.

Dowding currently resides in Fresno, California and is the owner of Champion Window Coverings.

== Results ==
(with Lorna Wighton)

Event	1974-75	1975-76	1976-77	1977-78	1978-79	1979-80
Winter Olympic Games						6th
World Championships			10th	6th	6th	5th
Canadian Championships	4th	3rd	2nd	1st	1st	1st
Skate America					3rd	
Skate Canada International		8th	6th	3rd	2nd	
Nebelhorn Trophy		1st				

(with Deborah Dowding)

Event	1971-72	1972-73	1973-74
Canadian Championships	5th J	1st J	4th
