= Handschmann =

Handschmann is a surname. Notable people with the surname include:

- Peter Handschmann (born 1957), Austrian ice dancer
- Susi Handschmann (born 1959), Austrian ice dancer
