= Pattern dance =

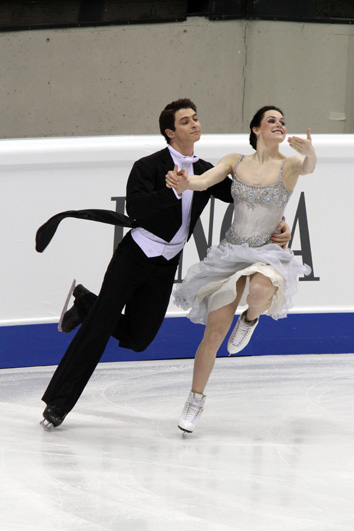
Canadians Tessa Virtue and Scott Moir performing the golden waltz

Pattern dances (also called set pattern dances or pattern dance elements) are a required element of the rhythm dance (RD) segment of ice dance. They have been defined as "the design of the dance on the ice". The International Skating Union (ISU), the organization that governs and oversees figure skating, has published pattern dance diagrams that include everything ice dancers need to know to perform one complete pattern, or sequence, of each dance. Pattern dances must adhere to the following requirements: accuracy, placement, skating skills, timing, style, unison, and presentation.

The ISU has published and has approved 32 pattern dances teams can use: the American waltz, the Argentine tango, the Austrian waltz, the blues, the cha cha, the cha cha congelado, the Dutch waltz, the European waltz, the Finnstep, the foxtrot, the golden waltz, the hickory hoedown, the Kilian, the midnight blues, the Paso Doble, the quickstep, the Ravensburger waltz, the rhumba, the rhythm blues, the rocker foxtrot, the silver samba, the starlight waltz, the swing dance, the tango, the tango Canasta, the tango fiesta, the tango romantica, the tea-time foxtrot, the ten-fox, the Viennese waltz, the willow waltz, and the Yankee polka.

== Background ==
Pattern dances, which the International Skating Union (ISU), the organization that governs and oversees figure skating, defines as "the design of the dance on the ice", are a required element of the rhythm dance (RD) segment of ice dance. (Note: See S&P/ID 2024, p. 140, for the list of pattern dances.) In the summer of 1938, the National Ice Skating Association (now called British Ice Skating) held a conference in London, where they discussed the creation of new ice dances. In November 1938, they held a competition open to amateur and professional ice dance teams, featuring the new dances they had created. The judges voted on their favorites, and the winning dance was the Argentine tango, followed by the Paso Doble and the quickstep.

The RD must include a set pattern dance, tern dances consist of prescribed patterns, steps, and turns skated to a defined rhythm and constant tempo. (Note: See S&P/ID 2024, pp. 129-137, for a list and description of steps, turns, and movements executed during the rhythm dance.) Pattern dance diagrams, published by the ISU, include everything ice dancers need to know to perform one complete pattern, called a sequence, of the dance. The pattern dance begins after the skaters make introductory steps. A section of the pattern dance is part of a pattern dance sequence, and a pattern dance element is "a series of prescribed steps, turns and movements in a Rhythm Dance", consisting of a sequence, section, or combination of steps and turns.

There are two types of pattern dances, the set pattern dance and the optional pattern dance. The set pattern dance is a pattern dance in which the "location, direction and curvature of all edges to be skated are designated in the diagram", as long as the diagram is followed as closely as possible. The optional pattern dance is a pattern dance in which the pattern may be changed by the team, if the original step sequences, positions, and timing are kept the same. Each repetition of the changed pattern must also be executed in the same way, and it must be commenced from the same place. Ice dancers can choose to perform the set pattern dance, following as closely as possible the directions, locations, and curvatures of all edges as designated in the diagram, which includes all the information needed to execute a complete pattern (or sequence) of the dance.

Dance teams may include optional introductory steps before the commencement of their pattern dances, but they are not counted as part of the pattern dance elements; the first step of the pattern dance must begin immediately after them. The music chosen by the ice dance teams for pattern dances, as is the case for the music used throughout the RD, can include vocals, must be "suitable for Ice Dance as a sport discipline", and must reflect the character of the music and/or selected dance rhythms and/or themes.

== Requirements ==
Pattern dances must follow the general requirements listed below:

- Accuracy. All steps, edges, elements/movements, and dance holds must follow the dance's description and ISU rules and regulations. Ice dance teams, however, are given "some latitude" so that they can "demonstrate their own individual style", which is usually accomplished by the use of a variety of arm and/or leg movements. The partners can execute arm and/or leg movements different from those prescribed, as long as the lead partner's hand remains in the prescribed hold position.
- Placement. The ISU prescribes that "maximum utilization of the ice surface is desirable". This requires deep edges and good flow throughout the pattern dance.
- Skating skills. The ISU states, "Good basic skating skills are required". These skills include the following:
  - Deep edges with speed, flow, and easy glide, in an effortless manner.
  - Cleanness and sureness of steps, edges, and transitions.
  - The partners must carry their weight over their skating foot.
  - Neat and precise footwork. Two-footed steps must be avoided except when prescribed.
  - Good and equal technical ability demonstrated by both partners.
  - The partners' skating-leg knees should be flexible, with a rhythmic rise and fall.
- Timing. The pattern dances, from the start, should be skated in strict time to the music. The prescribed number of beats for each step/movement must be coordinated with the music, and all steps must be completed without breaks in continuity.
- Style. The skaters' carriage should be upright, but not stiff, and with their heads held up. The ISU states, "All actions should be easy and flowing and performed in an elegant matter". All dance holds should be firm, and the fingers should not be spread or clenched. The partners should not apparently struggle for speed, and "speed should not be obtained at the expense of good style". Their free legs should be extended, with the foot turned out and pointed downward.
- Unison: The partners should skate as close together as possible while keeping a constant distance between them. All movements (leg swings, knee bends, and lean) should be well-coordinated and equal, the partners' performance should be balanced, and they should "move as one". The lead partner should demonstrate their ability to lead, and the follow partner should demonstrate their ability to follow.
- Presentation. The ISU prescribes that "the dance should be skated smoothly and rhythmically with the character of the music being correctly displayed" and "the partners should relate to one another". The partners' interpretation of the music and the dance should be demonstrated "by variations in the executions of dance movements" that reflect the music's rhythm patterns. Each pattern dance should have a distinct flavor.

== Dance patterns ==
=== American waltz ===
It is unknown who invented the American waltz, and the date of its first performance is also unknown. It is skated in the music rhythm of the waltz 3/4, and at a tempo of 66 three-beat measures per minute (198 beats per minute). All skating strokes are six beats in length, and like all waltzes, turns are made on the fourth beat. A waltz with three beats is not used because it would lose the waltz expression necessary in the dance. Each step of the American waltz is held for six beats (two measures of music), which means each step has considerable length. The skaters visually express waltz-type music, which consists of "evenness of flow between points of major and minor emphasis" in the music. The points of major emphasis are marked by the skaters' changes of feet and by the bending of their skating knees, while the points of minor emphasis are marked by turns, but are not emphasized.

The American waltz is skated both toward and away from the rink's midline. The sequence of steps in the American waltz is the simplest of any ice dance because of the amount of rotation created by the team. It is, however, one of the most difficult to skate correctly because to rotate smoothly, the team must keep their shoulders parallel to the center of rotation between them instead of "having one partner whip around the other" during the three-turns they execute. The rotation must also be even and continuous, instead of consisting of sudden jerks with pauses between steps. The partners must execute their three-turns, which are called "American waltz-type three-turns" in this dance, with their feet close together. They must maintain a close waltz hold throughout the dance, synchronizing their free-leg swings with each other and in time with the music. The skaters' knee action adds a lilt to the dance, which must be gradual or well-controlled; if not, the dance could become bouncy, and the skaters may lose balance and control. They must maintain an upright posture, using a well-controlled shift in body weight while beginning each section of the dance. (Note: See U.S. Figure Skating Rulebook, p. 368, for a diagram of the American waltz.)

See also

- American ice dance team Karen Li and James Zhu perform the American Waltz to "Snowman" by Sia

=== Argentine tango ===
The Argentine tango was invented by Reginald J. Wilkie and Daphne B. Wallis, and was first performed in London, England, in 1934. It is skated in the music rhythm of the tango 4/4, and at a tempo of 24 two-beat measures per minute (96 beats per minute). It is not hard to learn, despite its many steps, and is mostly made up of several sequences of rapid steps.

The Argentine tango should be skated with strong edges and with "considerable 'élan' ". It is composed of strong, flowing edges that should express its "true feeling and character". It covers the entire circumference of the ice rink surface and starts and finishes at the same point. The dance begins in the right-hand forward corner of the rink, with the partners in an open hold. It includes progressive and chassé sequences, as well as cross rolls, a counter step, a three-turn, an S step (previously called the "mohawk step"), a twizzle, and a variety of edges. Late in the dance, the partners must skate hip-to-hip for a couple of steps. The cross rolls must be skated lightly and on well-curved edges. Partners execute both open and closed holds and a Kilian hold, a type of hold in which the partners face each other in the same direction. (Note: See U.S. Figure Skating Rulebook, pp. 402-403, for diagrams of the Argentine tango for both the lead and follow partners.)

See also

French ice dancers Marina Anissina and Gwendal Peizerat's Argentine tango (2000)

=== Austrian waltz ===
The Austrian waltz was invented by Austrian ice dancers Susi Handschmann and Peter Handschmann, and was first performed in Vienna, Austria, in 1979. It is skated in the music rhythm of the waltz 3/4, and at a tempo of 60 four-beat measures per minute (180 beats per minute). The dance is "characterized by elegance of line combined with the typical lightness of the Viennese Waltz". It should be skated with strongly curved edges, the bending of the skating knee, and wide, extended movements of the free legs and the arms, "while maintaining a slow flow throughout" the dance.

The Austrian waltz starts in a Kilian hold. During its three-turns, the partners are in a closed hold, with their feet close together. The follow partner's twizzles should be skated in front of the lead partner and executed with the free foot crossed in front of the skating foot. There should be no stops in the flow of the dance, which is accomplished by the lead partner's hand supporting the follow partner's turns. The steps and movements of the Austrian waltz are composed of various turns and movements on both edges of the skate, including three steps, twizzles, cross rolls, a Ravensburger-type three-turn, a swing roll, and a rocker step. At one point, about halfway through the dance, one step ends with a "twizzle-like" motion, and both partners change to a "waltz" hold while their arms are extended in "helicopter" style as the lead partner skates backward. Then they execute European waltz-type three-turn steps while in a close hold. (Note: See U.S. Figure Skating Rulebook, pp. 407-408, for diagrams of the Austrian waltz for both the lead and follow partners.)

=== Blues ===
The blues was invented by British pairs skater and ice dancer Robert Dench and his partner, Lesley Turner, and was first performed in 1934 in London. It became popular soon after its introduction in Europe and underwent several changes over the years; by 1975, it had become a required rhythm dance at international competitions.

The blues is skated in the music rhythm of the blues 4/4, and at a tempo of 22 four-beat measures per minute (88 beats per minute). Dench and Turner's version of the blues dance was skated to twelve-bar music played on an organ or piano and was skated "as fast as 26 bars per minute", although it is difficult to execute the steps and movements correctly at that speed. Dench, who wrote about the blues dance in his book, Pair Skating and Dancing on Ice (1943), stated that they would often skate the blues pattern to foxtrot time, "but only if the music was slow enough so that the graceful effect of the dance is not lost". The blues dance should be skated "with strong edges and deep knee action to achieve the desired expression". The dance begins with the lead partner executing a forward cross roll and with the follow partner executing a back cross roll, moving from a partial outside hold to a closed hold. It ends with both partners in a closed hold. (Note: See U.S. Figure Skating Rulebook, p. 380, for a diagram of the dance.)

See also

- Jayne Torvill and Christopher Dean from Great Britain perform the blues compulsory dance at the 1994 Winter Olympics.

=== Cha cha ===
The cha cha was invented by Helen Gage Moore. It is skated in the music rhythm of the cha-cha 4/4, and at a tempo of 25 four-beat measures per minute (100 beats per minute). It can be executed in an open or Kilian hold; both partners skate the same steps throughout the dance. The cha cha has an unusual rhythm, so skaters must reflect it "with free leg expression" and "appropriate upper body and head position". Accurate timing is essential to its feeling and to maintaining its tempo throughout. A priority in its execution is achieving depth edge. The cha cha starts with a two-beat left forward outside edge, and ends with a right forward inside swing roll. (Note: See U.S. Figure Skating Rulebook, p. 348 for a diagram of the cha cha.)

=== Cha cha congelado ===
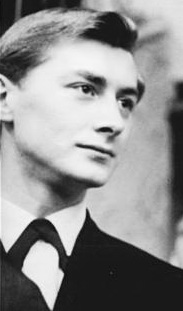
Bernard Ford (1966), one of the co-inventors of the cha cha congelado

The cha cha congelado was invented by Bernard Ford, Kelly Johnson, Laurie Palmer, and Steven Belanger, and was first performed in Richmond Hill, Ontario, in 1989. It is skated in the music rhythm of the cha-cha 4/4, and at a tempo of 29 four-beat measures per minute (116 beats per minute). It is designed to introduce beginning skaters to a Latin American rhythm and to "help them to appreciate rhythm not only with their feet but with their bodies".

According to U.S. Figure Skating, the organization that oversees figure skating in the United States, character is added to the cha cha congelado by partners if they maintain the integrity of their steps, turns, free leg positions, and dance holds. Retrogressions on pattern transitions are also allowed, and closed holds, open holds, hand-in-hand holds, and Kilian holds are executed. The dance includes slip steps and a C step (previously called the "choctaw step"). (Note: See U.S. Figure Skating Rulebook, p. 412, for a diagram of the cha cha congelado.)

See also

- Pearl Kang and Kyle Pearson from Canada perform the cha cha congelado (2017)

=== Dutch waltz ===
The Dutch waltz was created by George Muller and first performed in Colorado Springs, Colorado, in 1948. It is skated in the music rhythm of the waltz 2/3, and at a tempo of 46 three-beat measures per minute (138 beats per minute). It is skated in the Kilian hold.

Both partners skate the same steps of the Dutch waltz, "to slow, deliberate waltz music, and consists mostly of long swing rolls and progressive sequences". It was designed for beginning skaters and is an easy dance to learn because it consists of forward edges only and allows new skaters to "devote their attention to the dance steps" and to focus on skating in rhythm to the music. Skaters should pay "special attention" to the number of beats per step in the progressive sequences of the dance, starting with the forward inside edges of their left skate, in order to express the correct waltz rhythm (2–1–3). They should also ensure that they have, without too much effort, "erect, natural body position, good carriage and easy flow", that their free leg swings in unison, and their soft knee action occurs in time with the music. (Note: See U.S. Figure Skating Rulebook, p. 340, for a diagram of the Dutch waltz.)

=== European waltz ===
It is unknown who invented the European waltz; it was first performed before 1900, although the exact date and location are unknown. It is skated in the music rhythm of the waltz 3/4, and at a tempo of 45 three-beat measures per minute (135 beats per minute).

The European waltz has three basic steps. For the lead partner, the steps are a cross roll three-turn, a backward outside edge, and a forward outside edge. For the follow partner, the steps are a backward outside edge, a three-turn, and another backward outside edge. The skaters perform the dance in a closed hold throughout the dance; the partners must remain close together. According to U.S. Figure Skating, "erect posture, consistently powerful stroking, even free leg extensions and a regular rising and falling knee action give this dance its waltz flavor". Skaters should master the rhythm of this dance such that they have "no serious difficulty with it". If both partners have good waltz rhythm, it is easy to achieve the rotation needed and to maintain an easy, erect carriage, with their weight centered over the skating foot. Margaretta Drake, a previous ice dance judge for U.S. Figure Skating, says about the correct execution of the European waltz: " ...Watch the lovely waltz interpretation, which is a joy to behold". (Note: See U.S. Figure Skating Rulebook, p. 362, for a diagram of the European waltz.)

=== Finnstep ===
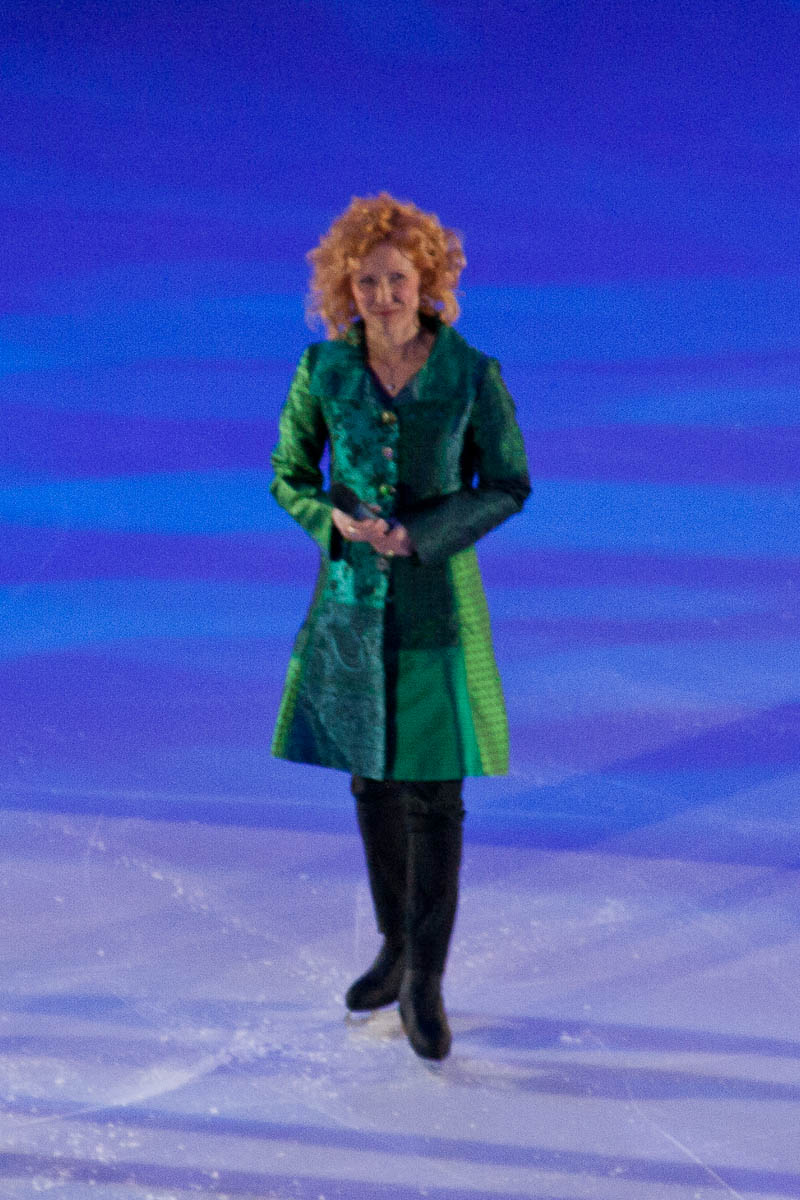
Finnish ice dancer Susanna Rahkamo (2011), one of the co-inventors of the Finnstep

The Finnstep was invented by Susanna Rahkamo and Petri Kokko, and was first performed in Dortmund, Germany, in 1995. It is skated in the music rhythm of the quickstep 2/4, and at a tempo of 52 two-beat measures per minute (104 beats per minute). It is more "boisterous" than other pattern dances, and includes some of the same spirit and technical nuance as the quickstep. U.S. Figure Skating calls the Finnstep "a fun, fast dance" and says that it resembles "sparkling champagne". It has also been called "a fan favorite". It "must be as much fun to watch as it is to dance". The Finnstep is a ballroom-type quickstep and should be danced "very lightly", although a polka or a folklore character should be avoided while performing. U.S. Figure Skating adds, "The dance is not serious, so it can even be performed a bit comically". It also measures the team's musicality.

The Finnstep requires crisp and tidy timing and footwork. According to U.S. Figure Skating, timing is the dance's most important characteristic; when it lacks crisp and tidy timing, as well as character, the team "should be penalized severely". Skaters should execute steps at the beginning of the beat, not just on the beat, because it helps them achieve the necessary lightness. The skaters' posture should be upright and almost stiff throughout the dance. Partners should skate the longer steps in the dance with strong, deep, and well-rounded edges, which should contrast with the dance's crisp and light steps, toe steps and hops (small jumps without rotation). U.S. Figure Skating also states: "Just skating the steps is not enough. It is how the steps are executed and what is 'said and expressed' with the technique that is important, not the technique in itself".

Skaters performing the Finnstep begin with a promenade section that sets up the character of the dance. Crisp and accurate timing, with emphasis on the music's upbeats, is crucial. The dance is skated on a straight line across the rink, in an open hold, with an upright style and quick hops that resemble a ballroom quickstep. Immediately following the promenade section is the twizzle section, in which the follow partner's twizzles of 1 1/2 rotations each must be executed quickly. The quick hops of this section must be executed in unison, using only the legs and knees, without using the upper body. Good, clean free-leg action, with controlled, nicely flowing, and deep edges, but without losing the dance's character and rhythm, is also required.

The partners face each other after completing the twizzles, and clasp their left hands while their right arms are extended to their sides, slightly above shoulder level. Then, after moving into an open hold, they prepare for the follow partner's swing-closed S step. The lead partner moves into a C step as they prepare for the second set of twizzles, and then they move into the final section of the Finnstep, in which they accelerate in order to create a clear crescendo. The section starts with a hop forward; then they land on their left feet. The dance ends with another section of twizzles. (Note: See U.S. Figure Skating Rulebook, pp. 417-418, for diagrams of the Finnstep for both the lead and follow partners.)

=== Fourteenstep ===
The fourteenstep was invented by Franz Scholler, and was originally called the tenstep or the Scholler march. It was first performed in Vienna, in 1889. It is skated in the music rhythm of the march 6/8 or 2/4, and at a tempo of 56 two-beat measures per minute (112 beats per minute). The dance begins and ends in a closed hold, with the follow partner skating backward, and the lead partner skating forward. Soft knee action matching the rhythm of the music and "easy graceful flow" are necessary to ensure that the fourteenstep is "danced rather than walked or raced". U.S. Figure Skating also recommends that a "strong lean" is necessary to ensure that the skaters "achieve the required edges at a good pace". (Note: See U.S. Figure Skating Rulebook, p. 359, for a diagram of the fourteenstep.)

See also

Annika Johnson and Olivia Brooks perform the fourteenstep

=== Foxtrot ===
The foxtrot was invented in 1933, and was first performed in London. Eric van der Weyden and Eva Keats, who were "true pioneers in the development of compulsory dances", created the dance, along with the rocker foxtrot and the Westminster waltz. The foxtrot is skated in the music rhythm of the foxtrot 4/4, and at a tempo of 25 four-beat measures per minute (100 beats per minute). The dance begins in an open hold, with the partners' shoulders and hips close together. As U.S. Figure Skating puts it, the foxtrot "must be danced, not stepped". The skaters must demonstrate soft knee action and flow, and their free foot must always be placed on the ice behind the skating foot. The dance is designed to be skated on the deep edges of their skates. (Note: See U.S. Figure Skating Rulebook, p. 365, for a diagram of the foxtrot.)

=== Golden waltz ===
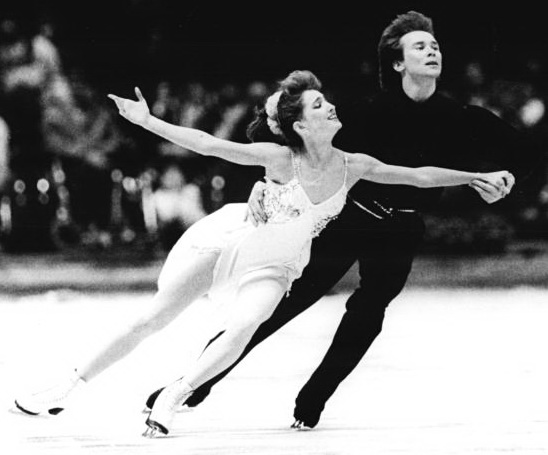
Marina Klimova and Sergei Ponomarenko, co-inventors of the golden waltz (1989)

The golden waltz was invented by Natalia Dubova, Marina Klimova, and Sergei Ponomarenko; it was first performed in Moscow, Russia, in 1987. It is skated in the music rhythm of the Viennese waltz 3/4, and at a tempo of 62 three-beat measures per minute (186 beats per minute). The Viennese waltz is considered the genesis of the golden waltz.

The golden waltz is a complex dance that incorporates positions that had not been commonly used in pattern dances; for example, the spread eagle and the shoot-the-duck. It has been called "a highly technical, demanding and elegant ice dance characterized by long, flowing edges, intricate, fast, and complex steps, and deep lyrical, and romantic movements". It is executed with long edges that are inspersed with twizzles and three-turns. Skaters need to demonstrate extra control during the dance because of its intricate steps, positions, and changes of hold. They must also maintain a consistent flow and "a lifting waltz character" throughout the dance.

The golden waltz starts in a closed hold for the opening three-turns, and is executed through open holds, Kilian holds, and reversed Kilian holds. It includes more three-turns, a cross step, an S step, a C step, and coupées. At about halfway through the dance, the lead partner executes a spread eagle into a rocker step. A little bit later, they enter into the "Casade and Dip" section, a series of three-turns, a twizzle-like motion, and a series of cross steps. The dance ends with both partners dancing on both feet and the lead partner executing a quick three-turn. (Note: See U.S. Figure Skating Rulebook, pp. 423-424, for diagrams of the golden waltz for both the lead and follow partners.)

See also

- Canadian ice dancers Tessa Virtue and Scott Moir perform the Golden Waltz at the 2010 World Championships

=== Hickory hoedown ===
The hickory hoedown was invented by Wendy Weinstock Milnar, Holly Genola Coletak, and H. Theodore Graves, and was first performed in New York City in 1987. It is skated in the music rhythm of the country-western hoedown 4/4, and at a tempo of 32 four-beat measures per minute (104 beats per minute). The hickory hoedown is "a symmetrical half-rink pattern dance", and has been described as "light, carefree and airy".

The music for the hickory hoedown should be taken from formal square dancing, should convey the country-western style of music, and should "reflect enjoyment and flair throughout". The free leg action required, if the skaters show supple knee action and good control, adds crispness and accents the character of the dance. The content of the dance is mostly symmetrical because it contains identical sequences in both directions. As a result, well-controlled knee bends, exaggerated and firm leg extensions, and well-controlled and deep edges are required for appropriate expression. (Note: See U.S. Figure Skating Rulebook, p. 352, for a diagram of the hickory hoedown.)

=== Kilian ===
The Kilian was invented by Karl Schreiter, and was first performed in Vienna, in 1909. It is skated in the music rhythm of the march 2/4 and 4/4, and at a tempo of 58 two-beat measures per minute or 29 four-beat measures per minute (116 beats per minute). It requires close and accurate footwork and unison of control and rotation. An upright position is required throughout the dance, which follows a counterclockwise elliptical pattern, although skaters can begin anywhere around the pattern. Skaters cannot change the shift of the dance's pattern once it has been established, however, and they must control the clockwise rotation.

The skaters must skate close together in a Kilian hold throughout the dance, and "particular care should be taken to avoid any separation". The lead partner's right hand should clasp the follow partner's right hand and "keep it firmly pressed on the follow partner's right hip" in order to avoid separation. The lead partner's left hand should also clasp the follow partner's left hand, which ensures that the follow partner's left arm is firmly extended across the lead partner's body. (Note: See U.S. Figure Skating Rulebook, p. 377, for a diagram of the Kilian.)

See also

- U.S. ice dancers Katie Wyble and Justin Morrow perform the Kilian

=== Midnight blues ===
The midnight blues was invented by Roy Bradshaw, Sue Bradshaw, Mark Bradshaw, and Julie MacDonald; it was first performed in Vancouver, British Columbia, in 2001. It is skated in the music rhythm of the blues 4/4, and at a tempo of 22 four-beat measures per minute (88 beats per minute). It should be skated with deep knee action and strong edges in order to "achieve the desired slow, rhythmic, relaxed and easygoing expression" required. Skaters can include their individual interpretation to add blues character to the dance, if the prescribed steps, free leg positions, and positions and/or holds are maintained.

The midnight blues begins in the center of the rink, with the partners in a reverse foxtrot hold, which is an unusual open position. Steps and movements performed in the dance include three-turns, coupées, cross steps, rocker steps, cross rolls, a swing roll, an Ina Bauer, and a twizzle. They also execute Kilian holds, closed, open, and outside holds, a hand-to-hand hold, and a reverse outside hold. Both partners' body positions should be parallel, and they should both be as horizontal to the ice as possible. They move out of these positions by rising up and executing double three-turns, during which the lead partner moves the follow partner from the lead partner's right side to the lead partner's left side. The midnight blues concludes when the lead partner executes a cross roll step in an outside hold with the follow partner. Then they skate in a Kilian hold, mirroring their final steps. (Note: See U.S. Figure Skating Rulebook, pp. 428-429, for diagrams of the midnight blues for both the lead and follow partners.)

See also

- Midnight blues patterns, 2021 Skate Canada

=== Paso Doble ===
The Paso Doble was invented by Reginald J. Wilkie and Daphne B. Wallis, and was first performed in London, in 1938. It is skated in the music rhythm of the Paso Doble 2/4, and at a tempo of 56 two-beat measures per minute (112 beats per minute). It is a "dramatic and powerful Spanish dance" that requires precise footwork and good body control. It can be expressed in either "in terms of its origins from the music of bull fighting or in Flamenco style". The lead partner plays the role of the matador in the Paso Doble, while the follow partner takes on the role of the cape or the bull, although they have the freedom to switch the roles if they so choose.

F. Ritter Shumway, who was president of U.S. Figure Skating, stated that although the Paso Doble rhythm dance was skated fast, it was not skated as fast on the ice as the ballroom dance was performed off the ice. Shumway also recommended that the dance be performed accompanied by Spanish music and said that it "presents great possibilities for something new, lively and colorful". The pace is fast, and the music "should be lively". British ice dancer Reginald Wilkie said about the Paso Doble, "Dancers liking quick tempo and fast, vigorous dancing will certainly enjoy this dance and it is highly recommended since they should have little trouble in learning the dance and should get much pleasure from skating it".

The dance is composed of sequences of short, one-beat steps. It begins in an outside hold, with the follow partner to the right of the lead partner, and with a progressive sequence, followed by two chassé sequences. Then the partners execute "most unusual" slip steps (also called "slide steps"), with the follow partner skating backward and the lead partner skating forward. They can perform the steps either by skating with the knee or knees of the weight-bearing leg or legs bent, or by skating with the knee or knees of both weight-bearing legs straight. The lead partner lifts their free foot distinctly from the ice, a front cross step, and two chassés and a progressive sequence while in an open hold, while the follow partner skates a cross-behind chassé followed by two chassês and a progressive sequence. They then move into a closed hold, and then a cross rolling movement, which U.S. Figure Skating calls "the most difficult portion of the dance". The Paso Doble's overall pattern, similar to the Kilian, is "approximately elliptical", and is distorted by occasional outward bulges. (Note: See U.S. Figure Skating Rulebook, pp. 383-384, for diagrams of the Paso Doble for both the lead and follow partners.)

=== Quickstep ===
The quickstep was invented by Reginald J. Wilkie and Daphne B. Wallis, and was first performed in London in 1938. It is skated in the music rhythm of the quickstep 2/4, at a tempo of 56 four-beat measures per minute (112 beats per minute), and "in keeping with the music that is fast and of bright character". The quickstep is skated at a rate three times faster than it was when it was created. The first time the quickstep was performed at an international competition was at the 1952 World Figure Skating Championship.

In 1951, ice dancer Erik van der Weyden said in his book, Dancing on Ice, that "the fairly advanced skater should get considerable pleasure" from skating the quickstep. He called it "a lively dance, with plenty of go", adding that its simple but not overly long sequence requires that dancers execute skating skill and control, and provides them with the opportunity to demonstrate strong edges. One of the most challenging aspects of the dance is demonstrating their partnering skills. They should also demonstrate "lively, light-hearted expression in both the body and faces", as well as execute "a light bounce, but not too overexaggerated". Finally, van der Weyden said, about the quickstep, that if it were "skated with élan, it has a peculiar sway and character which makes it thrilling to dance, and pleasant to watch".

The quickstep is skated in a Kilian hold throughout the dance, with both partners skating the same steps. It is crucial that the skaters remain hip-to-hip, with the lead partner's right hip against the follow partner's left hip, to ensure a good performance; it has been said that "the best teams will seem like they are attached to the hip". It is also crucial that the quickstep is started approximately at the end of the ice rink surface so that the skaters can skate true edges throughout. The skaters must follow the direction of the edges depicted in the diagram provided (Note: See U.S. Figure Skating Rulebook, p. 399.) because the sequence of steps requires them to use approximately the entire length of the ice surface. The steps used in the execution of the quickstep include a chassé sequence, two progressive sequences, a closed swing S step, a cross step, and a cross roll.

There are no advanced turns or changes in position, so the sequence of steps in the quickstep is simple. However, as its co-creator Wilkie states in his advice to skaters attempting the dance, "practical experience shows that the Quickstep is not easy to skate well". The change of holds and timing are the most difficult parts of the dance. Partners can also execute twizzles during the first half of the quickstep, which the best teams accomplish with speed and ease.

=== Ravensburger waltz ===
The Ravensburger waltz was invented by Angelika Buck, Erich Buck, and Betty Callaway; it was first performed in Krefeld, Germany, in 1973. It is skated in the music rhythm of the waltz 3/4, and at a tempo of 66 four-beat measures per minute (198 beats per minute). It should be skated "with the character of the Viennese waltz". When skaters execute a continuous knee action, they achieve a strong waltz feeling. The dance commences with "Ravensburger-type" three-turn, executed first in an open hold, quickly followed by a closed hold, and completed when the lead partner and the follow partner skate a swing roll, executing alternate inside three-turns while lifting their free legs before bringing them back inside the skating foot in time for the next step. The partners execute a variety of steps, turns, and movements during the Ravensburger waltz, including three-turns, a swing roll, an open C step, a chassé, a progressive, twizzles, a swing rocker step, and a closed S step. They also execute a variety of holds, including open and closed holds, and a Kilian hold. The dance ends with the lead partner executing a two-beat three-turn and the follow partner executing a quick one-beat three-turn in closed position; these steps constitute the "walk-around" three-turns, with fast timing from the follow partner, who matches the music's syncopation. (Note: See U.S. Figure Skating Rulebook, pp. 432-433, for a diagram of the Ravensburger waltz.)

- Amy Webster and Ron Kravette perform the Ravensburger Waltz at the 1995 U.S. Figure Skating Championships.

=== Rhumba ===
The rhumba was invented by Walter Gregory, and was first performed in London in 1938. It is skated in the music rhythm of the rhumba 4/4, and at a tempo of 44 two-beat measures per minute (176 beats per minute). It is not an easy dance. A few of its movements are "unorthodox" because "they depart from the stereotyped lines that have been followed" in other dances. According to U.S. Figure Skating, it is "a lively but soft and subtle dance that must be skated with hidden power and control". They also state, "Care must be taken to preserve the smoothness of the Rhumba and to prevent the dance from becoming excessively bouncy or jerky". Jumping during the rhumba should be avoided.

The rhumba is skated in a Kilian hold throughout the dance, with both partners executing the same steps. Skaters typically make four steps before the dance begins in order to gain the speed needed throughout. It starts with a chassé step, which differs from most chassés because the left foot does not leave the ice and carries the skater's weight. Then the free foot is brought to the side of the skating foot, followed by a lift and a "pronounced outward movement" executed simultaneously with a rise of the skating knee. Other steps and movements in the rhumba include a cross roll, three-turns, and S steps. If the S steps are not stepped wide enough, the dance "loses much of its strength". (Note: See U.S. Figure Skating Rulebook, p. 436, for a diagram of the rhumba.)

- Meryl Davis and Charlie White performing the rhumba at the 2007 World Figure Skating Championships.

=== Rhythm blues ===
The rhythm blues, originally a roller skating dance, was invented by Robert Craigin. It is skated in the Kilian position; both partners skate the same steps. It has a slow tempo (22 four-beat measures per minute, at 88 beats per minute) and is skated forward, but it is not as simple as it seems, because correct timing and proper expression are required to make it pleasurable to watch. Skaters must pay attention to the depth of their skate edges and proper curvature while skating the dance. They must execute the dance with knee bends and the extension of their free leg, "for blues interpretation", and for smooth and flowing movement. It starts with a progressive sequence and outside swing roll, and its timing becomes more intricate as the dance continues. (Note: See U.S. Figure Skating Rulebook, p. 344, for a diagram of the rhythm blues)

=== Rocker foxtrot ===
The rocker foxtrot was invented by Eric van der Weyden and Eva Keats, and was first performed in London, in 1934. It is skated in the music rhythm of the foxtrot 4/4, and at a tempo of 26 four-beat measures per minute (104 beats per minute). It begins at the midline at one end of the ice rink; it must be skated on both sides of the rink, so it requires two sequences of the dance to fill the entire rink surface. It starts with both partners skating in an open hold. Both partners execute a swing rocker step, which is a turn executed on one foot from an outside edge or from an outside edge to an inside edge. They must also execute a change to a closed hold, a cross roll, and a C step. The rocker foxtrot should be executed with good knee action and a change of lean and flow to enhance its character. (Note: See U.S. Figure Skating Rulebook, p. 374, for a diagram of the rocker foxtrot.)

See also

- Annabel Mann and Jack Hammond from England perform the rocker foxtrot.

=== Silver samba ===
The silver samba was invented by Courtney J.L. Jones and Peri V. Horne, and was first performed in London, in 1963. It is skated in the music rhythm of the samba 2/4, and at a tempo of 54 two-beat measures per minute (108 beats per minute). According to U.S. Figure Skating, "Individual interpretation by couples to add Samba character is permitted provided that the integrity of steps, free leg position and holds is maintained". As is true for all samba dances, the silver samba should be "an energetic and fast dance with sharp extensions, lively facial expressions, and body movements".

The silver samba contains sharp, neat footwork while maintaining the smoothness characteristic of a Latin dance. It begins with the partners in a Kilian hold as they skate two run sequences. The steps and movements included are cross over steps, a three-turn, three series of chassés, the first one "in the character of the Samba" on a curved pattern, a slide chassé, swing rolls, which are easy to identify, and slip/slide steps, which must be skated on the correct number of beats. The hardest part about the silver samba is executing its swing rolls while correctly executing its edges, change of edges, and crossed step. (Note: See U.S. Figure Skating Rulebook, pp. 439-440, for diagrams of the silver samba for both the lead and follow partners.)

See also

- Canadians Shae-Lynn Bourne and Victor Kraatz perform the silver samba.

=== Starlight waltz ===
The Starlight waltz was invented by British ice dancers Courtney J.L. Jones and Peri Horne, and was first performed in London, in 1963. It is skated in the music rhythm of the waltz 3/4, and at a tempo of 58 three-beat measures per minute (174 beats per minute).

The dance starts in a closed hold, and is followed by three chassé sequences for both partners. The movement of the free leg several steps later can be interpreted in whatever way the skaters wish. They also execute a swing roll, three three-turns by the lead partner and two three-turns by the follow partner, and a closed-hold C step by the follow partner while the lead partner skates a back progressive step. They skate in open hold, then the follow partner skates an open-hold C step, and then they both resume in a closed hold for a swing roll, which is reversed in the next two steps. During the above-mentioned C steps, the follow partner may place the heel of their free foot to either the inside or at the heel of the lead partner's skating foot before they turn. For the end of the dance, where the partners place their hands and arms depends upon the cross rolls and chassés they execute. The final steps they execute, while in a Kilian hold, are a cross step, another chassé, and a swing three-return. (Note: See U.S. Figure Skating Rulebook, pp. 387-388, for diagrams of the Starlight waltz for both the lead and follow partners.)

See also

- Mimi Marler Davies and Joseph Black from Great Britain perform the Starlight waltz

=== Swing dance ===
The swing dance was invented by Hubert Sprott and was first performed in Colorado Springs, in 1948. It is skated to the swing dance in the music rhythm of the foxtrot 4/4 or the Schottische 2/4, and at a tempo of 24 four-beat measures per minute (96 beats per minute). It introduces beginning skaters "to a fourth basic rhythm".

The swing dance allows partners to learn a relaxed way to transition from forward to backward skating and teaches the lead dancer how to lead and the follow dancer how to follow while skating both backward and forward. It demonstrates the skaters' skills, especially in executing their edges and it the proper curvature as they make their way around the ice rink surface. The team dances hand-in-hand, which allows the "skater traveling backward to step forward easily and in a relaxed manner", with their right hand in the partner's left hand. They both should be at least 24 inches apart when moving forward for part of the dance, and should, at this time, be executed "with soft knee action". The appearance of their arms is up to their discretion. Finally, according to U.S. Figure Skating, "Any type of forward inside uncrossed C step is permissible as long as the balance and control are good and the execution is pleasing to watch". (Note: See U.S. Figure Skating Rulebook, p. 346, for a diagram of the swing dance.)

=== Tango ===
The tango was invented by Paul Kreckow and Trudy Harris, and was first performed in London, in 1932. It is skated in the music rhythm of the tango 4/4 or 2/4, and at a tempo of 27 four-beat measures per minute (108 beats per minute). The skaters must maintain "very erect carriage" throughout the dance, and they must skate close together. The pace, without obvious effort or visible pushing, must be maintained throughout the dance. It consists of quick, crossed steps, skated on "shallow curves interspersed between slower rolls skated on strong curves", followed by a promenade skated in an open position. The tango begins with the skaters in an outside hold and ends with a closed hold. (Note: See U.S. Figure Skating Rulebook, p. 371, for a diagram of the tango.)

=== Tango Canasta ===
The Tango Canasta, which introduces beginning skaters to the tango rhythm, was invented by James B. Francis, and was first performed in 1951. Teams skate to the Tango Canasta in the music rhythm of the tango 2/3, and at a tempo of 26 four-beat measures per minute (104 beats per minute). It gives skaters experience executing large eight-count half-circles, which builds their confidence and increases their speed on their edges, and provides them with more variety in their skating. The Tango Canasta is skated in the reverse Kilian hold, which is similar to the Kilian hold, "but with the follow at the lead's left". Both partners skate the same steps, which consist of forward edges only. According to U.S. Figure Skating, "Neat footwork, good edges, tango expression and good carriage should be maintained throughout" the Tango Canasta. (Note: See U.S. Figure Skating Rulebook, p. 342, for a diagram of the Tango Canasta.)

=== Tango fiesta ===
The tango fiesta was invented by George Muller in Colorado Springs, in 1948. It is skated in the music rhythm of a slow tango 4/4, and at a tempo of 27 four-beat measures per minute (108 beats per minute). Both partners skate the same steps; they should "strive for upright carriage, soft knee action, easy flow and smooth, uniform leg swings". The dance starts with the reversed Kilian hold, and changes to the Kilian hold later on in its execution. The sequence of steps allows the team to execute easy, rhythmic movements; they should be able to "interpret the music and skate the steps in a very pleasing style". (Note: See U.S. Figure Skating Rulebook, p. 350, for a diagram of the tango fiesta.)

=== Tango romantica ===
The tango romantica was invented by Ljudmila Pakhomova, Alexsandr Gorshkov, and Elena Tschaikovskaja; it was first performed in Moscow, in 1974. According to U.S. Figure Skating, it "is a romantic dance which is skated in a soft, lyrical and sinuous lead partner with both a soft and strong character where appropriate; however, deep edges are necessary to convey its mood".

The tango romantica commences in a closed hold. The skaters also execute open and closed holds, and Kilian holds throughout the dance. Its steps and movements include a double three-turn with a "helicopter", or a movement in which both partners execute a side lift on their free legs, a swing twizzle-like motion, actual twizzles, a chassé, C steps, cross rolls, a progressive sequence, three-turns, rocker steps, and S steps. At one point, the skaters, after being in a closed hold, execute rapid running steps. (Note: See U.S. Figure Skating Rulebook, pp. 444-445, for diagrams of the tango romantica for both the lead and follow partners.)

Ljudmila Pakhomova, Alexsandr Gorshkov, and
Elena Tschaikovskaja, co-inventors of the Tango romantica

See also

- Tessa Virtue and Scott Moir from Canada perform the tango romantica at the 2010 Vancouver Winter Olympics

=== Tea-time foxtrot ===
The tea-time foxtrot was invented by Sylwia Nowak-Trębacka, Natalia Kaliszek, and Maksym Spolyriev; it was first performed in Oberstdorf, Germany, in 2016. It is skated in the music rhythm of the slow fox 4/4, and at a tempo of 26 four-beat measures per minute (108 beats per minute). It is "an extremely smooth, progressive dance characterized by long, continuous flowing movements across the ice". It has up and down knee actions, so a rise and fall action should be present, as well as continuity in its steps and movements, "so that if there is a full cup of tea on the head of the dancing follow partner, no drop would be spilled". The tea-time foxtrot's pattern is optional, and the follow partner's twizzle early in the dance may be executed either parallel to the long border around the corner of the rink or parallel to the short border. If they choose the second option, they will cross the rink's long axis, and the retrogression of the next steps is allowed.

A dance frame, correct posture, connection, and foxtrot timing are essential for an effective and comfortable tea-time foxtrot. Both partners' bodies should remain erect, without leaning towards each other. When they are in a closed hold, they should maintain "light contact in the diaphragm area". According to U.S. Figure Skating, "The lead partner should present the follow partner, and the dance holds should be very elegant throughout the whole dance".

The dance is choreographed in typical foxtrot timing ("slow-quick-quick, slow-quick-quick"), using all dance holds, which include a Kilian hold, a foxtrot hold, and a waltz hold. Their holds should never be broken, even during the twizzles. U.S. Figure Skating also says that the tea-time foxtrot should be danced as if they were "having a relaxing tea-time break during a long day of work". Steps and movements performed during the tea-time foxtrot include three-turns, a skidded three-turn, a walk-around three-turn, crossed steps, cross rolls, a cross slide step, a backward crossover step, toe-pick hops, an Ina Bauer, twizzles, an S step, a chassé, progressive steps, swing steps, a rocker step, a swing rocker step, and a C step. The dance ends with a Kilian hold. (Note: See U.S. Figure Skating Rulebook, pp. 451-452, for diagrams of the tea-time foxtrot for both the lead and follow partners.)

=== Ten-fox ===
The ten-fox was invented by George Muller, and was first performed in Philadelphia, Pennsylvania, in 1939. It is skated in the music rhythm of the foxtrot 4/4, and at a tempo of 25 four-beat measures per minute (100 beats per minute). It was created by combining elements of the foxtrot and the tenstep, which was created by Franz Schoeller in Berlin, Germany, in 1889, later replaced by the fourteenstep, which became one of the most popular dances in the world.

The ten-fox demands that the partners change holds several times, and includes the closed offset hold also in the fourteenstep. It also includes similar changes of hold to the foxtrot. It begins in a waltz/closed position, returns to a waltz position, and ends in an offset closed hold. The character of the dance can be enhanced by expressing the dance rhythm through the timing of the skaters' body movements. They must, in order to interpret the dance's rhythm correctly, "demonstrate an effortless glide attained by soft knee action". (Note: See U.S. Figure Skating Rulebook, p. 356, for a diagram of the ten-fox.)

=== Viennese waltz ===
The Viennese waltz was invented by Eric van der Weyden and Eva Keats, and was first performed in London, in 1934. It is skated in the music rhythm of the waltz 3/4, and at a tempo of 52 three-beat measures per minute (156 beats per minute). It has been called a "light and lilting dance". The Viennese waltz requires soft knee action, neat footwork, and elegant carriage. It starts with a progressive sequence and ends with a skated closed hold featuring strong edges, rising knee action, and a free leg swing that emphasizes the dance's character. (Note: See U.S. Figure Skating Rulebook, pp. 391-392, for diagrams of the Viennese waltz for both the lead and follow partners.)

See also

- Jodie Russell and Aaron Freeman perform the Viennese waltz

=== Westminster waltz ===
The Westminster waltz was invented by Eric van der Weyden and Eva Keats, and was first performed in London, in 1938. It is skated in the music rhythm of the waltz 3/4, and at a tempo of 54 three-beat measures per minute (162 beats per minute). It is characterized by stately carriage, which requires an upright stance without breaking at the waist, and elegance of line. The ISU added the Westminster waltz to its official list of compulsory dances in 1951, and it was used in major international competitions, including the 1968 World Championships and the 1984 Olympic Games.

The Westminster waltz should also be skated with "strong edges and a softly flowing knee action". The dance starts and ends in a Kilian hold. It contains many changes of position, which should appear effortless and in "excellent unison". Figure skating journalist Anne Calder calls the Westminster waltz, along with the Golden waltz, "dances that separate good teams from great ones" and calls it the "Westmonster". She also states that dignified expressions, soft knee bends without bounce, free leg extensions that are "strong but not flamboyant", and the free leg movements of both partners enhance the dance's refined character. (Note: See U.S. Figure Skating Rulebook, pp. 395-396, for diagrams of the Westminster waltz for both the lead and follow partners.)

See also

- Canadian ice dancers Charlotte Chung and Jacob Yang perform the Westminster waltz

=== Willow waltz ===
The Willow waltz was invented by George Muller, and was first performed in Willow Springs, Illinois, in 1953. It is skated in the music rhythm of the waltz 3/4, and at a tempo of 46 three-beat measures per minute (138 beats per minute). According to William O. Hickok, IV, in Skating Magazine, the Willow waltz was one of the most rapidly accepted and universally popular ice dances. Hickok recommended that since the dance fills an entire rink, it should be started near the end of the rink. (Note: See Hickok for more of his recommendations regarding the willow waltz, especially for beginning skaters.)

The Willow waltz offers skaters a variety of turns, steps, and sequences of steps. Correct timing and execution are required to express the dance's rhythm and flow, and skaters should focus on clean, distinct, and rhythmic progressive and chassé sequences. It should be executed with gliding movement and soft knee action. Partners should maintain unison and exact carriage throughout the dance, skating close together while striving for neat footwork, but without wide stepping. They should attempt to execute the dance at a good pace and flow, without effort and visible pushing. (Note: See U.S. Figure Skating Rulebook, p. 354, for a diagram of the willow waltz.)

=== Yankee polka ===
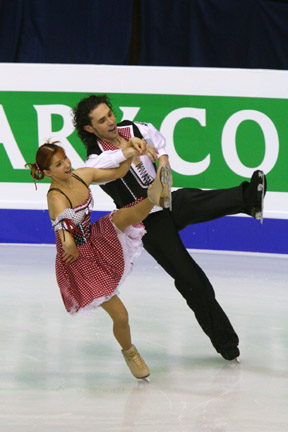
Jana Khokhlova and Sergei Novitski from Russia performing the Yankee polka

The Yankee polka was invented by James Sladky, Judy Schwomeyer, and Ron Landham; it was first performed in Wilmington, Delaware, in 1969. It is skated in the music rhythm of the polka 2/4, and at a tempo of 60 two-beat measures per minute (120 beats per minute). It is a "bouncy" dance, but it must be executed with stroking and effortless flow. The character of the Yankee polka is achieved "through the interesting use of one beat edges and very short steps skated on the 'and' between counts".

Partners must remain close together so that they minimize "the whipping action generated by the short precise steps and rapid turning movements". The dance begins in an open hold and a chassé sequence skated in an almost-straight line. Other holds include Kilian holds, an arm-in-arm hold, a closed hold, and a semi-open hold. Other steps and movements in the Yankee polka include three-turns, a two-beat swing step, a cross step, a short step sequence, a ballroom polka step sequence, and chassés. (Note: See U.S. Figure Skating Rulebook, pp. 456-457, for diagrams of the Yankee polka for both the lead and follow partners.)

See also

- Czech ice dancers Andrea Juklova and Martin Šimeček perform the Yankee Polka at the 1988 Skate America

== Works cited ==
- The 2025-26 Official U.S. Figure Skating Rulebook. Colorado Springs, Colorado: U.S. Figure Skating. 2025. Archived from the original on 28 February 2026.
- "Special Regulations & Technical Rules – Single & Pair Skating and Ice Dance 2024" (PDF). International Skating Union. June 2024. Archived (PDF) from the original on 9 November 2024.
