= Rhythm dance =

Segment in an ice dancing competition

The rhythm dance (RD) is the first segment of an ice dance competition. The International Skating Union (ISU) renamed the short dance to the "rhythm dance" in June 2018, prior to the 2018–2019 season. It became part of international competitions in July 2018. American ice dancers Madison Chock and Evan Bates hold the highest RD score of 93.91, which they achieved at the World Team Trophy in 2023.

== Background ==
The rhythm dance (RD) is the first segment performed in all junior and senior ice dance competitions, performed before the free dance (FD), at all International Skating Union (ISU) Championships, Junior and Senior ISU Grand Prix events and finals, Winter Youth Olympic Games, qualifying competitions for the Winter Olympic Games, and Olympic Winter Games. The ISU defines the RD as "a dance created by an Ice Dance Couple to dance music with designated rhythm(s) and/or theme(s)" selected and announced by the ISU yearly. In 2010, the ISU voted to eliminate the compulsory dance (CD) and the original dance (OD) and change the structure of ice dance competitions to include the short dance (SD) and free dance (FD). In the 2018–19 season, the short dance (SD) came to be known as the rhythm dance (RD) because, according to the ISU, the new term "is better aligned with what the competition is all about". The structure and rules for the RD, however, remained essentially the same.

For both junior and senior dance teams, the duration of the RD is "2 minutes and 50 seconds (unless otherwise decided by the Ice Dance Technical Committee and announced in an ISU Communication)". The ISU states that the time a program begins "must be reckoned" from the moment the skaters begin to move or skate until they come to a complete stop at the end of their program. The RD must include a pattern dance element, which it defines as a "series of prescribed steps, turns and movements in a Rhythm Dance" consisting of a sequence and/or section of a pattern dance and a combination of steps or turns from a pattern dance. Pattern dance diagrams, published by the ISU, include everything ice dancers need to know to perform one complete pattern, called a sequence, of the dance. Ice dancers can choose to perform the set pattern dance, following as closely as possible the direction, location, and curvature of all edges as designated in the diagram. They can also perform the optional pattern dance, which can be altered as long as the dancers maintain the original dance's step sequences, timing, and positions, and if each repetition is performed in the same way and is restarted from the same place as the first repetition.

The RD should be "developed through skating skill and quality", rather than through "non-skating actions such as sliding on one knee" or through the use of toe steps (which should only be used to reflect the music's nuances and underlying rhythm, and the dance's character). RDs should be choreographed to reach all sides of the ice rink, and not be focused only on the judges' section. Touching the ice with the hands is not allowed, unless otherwise specified and announced by the ISU; sliding or kneeling on two knees, or sitting on the ice, are also not allowed, as these are considered by the judges to be a fall, unless otherwise specified/announced.

The music chosen by the ice dance teams for the RD, including music for the specified pattern dance, can include vocals, must be "suitable for Ice Dance as a sport discipline", and must reflect the character of the music and/or selected dance rhythms and/or themes. The RD must fit the phrasing of the music ice dance teams use. It must "be translated to the ice by demonstrating technical skill with steps and movements along with flow and the use of edges". Ice dance teams can choose music with "an audible rhythmic beat," although the music can be, at the start of the program, "without an audible rhythmic beat" for up to 10 seconds. There are no restrictions on dance holds or any variation of dance holds during the RD. Ice dance teams lose points (one point per program) if they stop in one place for more than ten seconds at the beginning and/or at the end of their programs. They are allowed a full stop of up to ten seconds, or two full stops of up to five seconds each, during the course of the program. A dance spin or choreographic spinning movement that does not travel is considered a stop. Ice dance teams should not separate, except when necessary for performing any required element or to change a hold, and they can only be separated by up to two arms' lengths during that time. Separations that occur at the beginning and/or end of the program can only last up to 10 seconds, and there are no restrictions on the distance of the separation at that time.

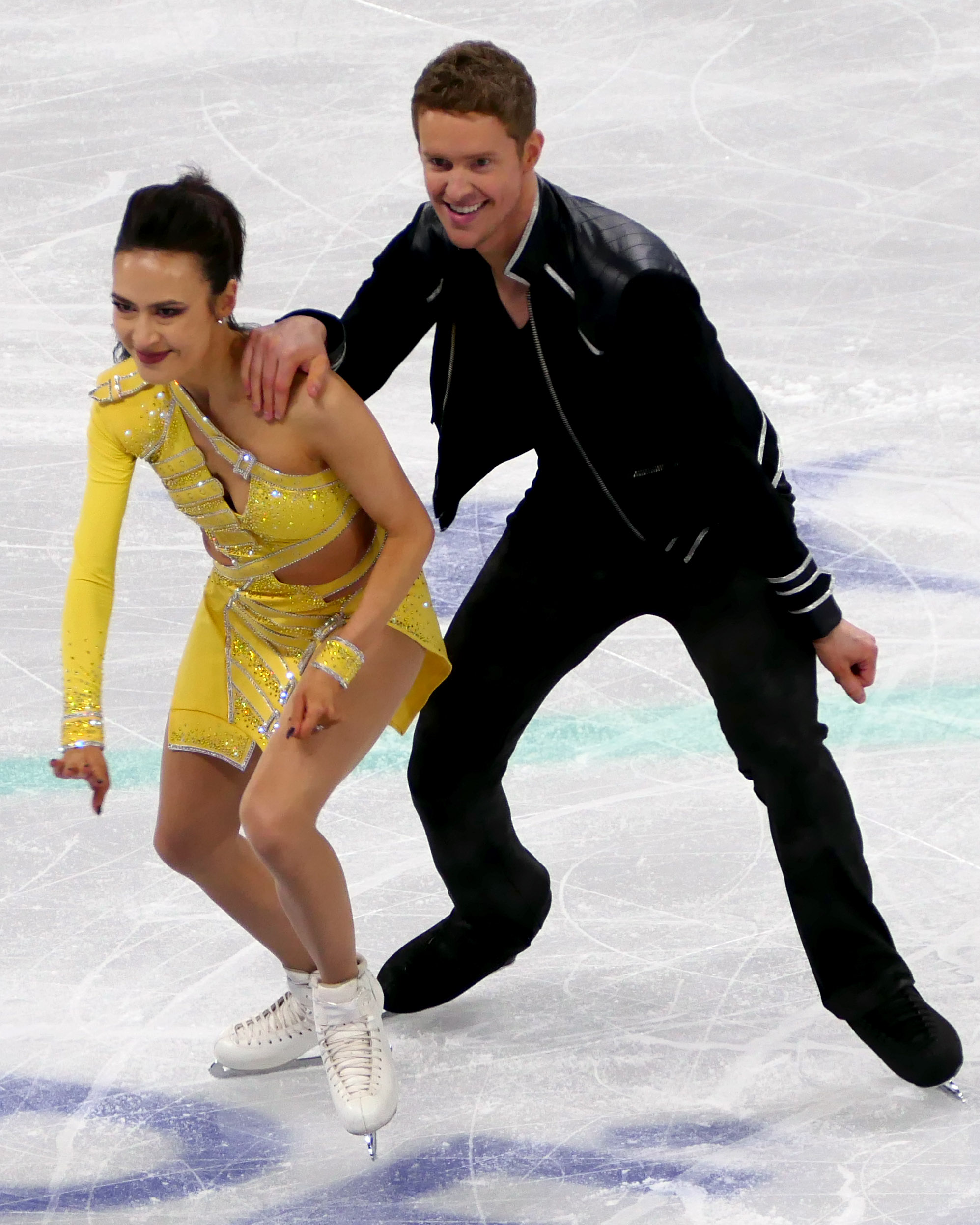
Madison Chock and Evan Bates at the 2024 World Figure Skating Championships

All changes of position, dance steps, rotations, and turns are allowed, as long as they follow the music and the designated rhythms. The two skaters can fully extend their arms while skating in a hand-to-hand hold only if it reflects the character of their chosen music rhythm, but this method of separation must not be excessively used. Both partners must perform "difficult, original, varied and intricate footwork" during the RD. As of the 2019–20 season, female ice dancers were allowed to wear trousers; in the 2024–2025 season, both partners could wear trousers of any length during their RD.

American ice dancers Madison Chock and Evan Bates hold the highest RD score of 93.91, which they achieved at the World Team Trophy in 2023.

== Requirements 2026-2027 season ==
The required elements for the RD are announced by the ISU yearly. The elements that may be required in the RD are: dance lift(s), dance spin(s), turn sequence(s), step sequence(s), pattern dance element(s), and choreographic element(s).

The RD has to reflect the character of the music and/or theme(s) of the selected rhythm or theme. For the 2026-2027 season, which was published in June 2026, the ISU selected for both seniors and junior teams was "Rhythm and Waltz". Any style of waltz was allowed, could range between traditional forms to modern interpretation of the dance styles, and had to include at least one additional rhythm, tempo, and dance style. The waltz section had to be in either 2/3 or 6/8 time. Partners were allowed to use remixed and/or remastered music, including cover versions, and they could use music created via artificial intelligence. The RD had to be performed in a different style than the FD. They were expected to "express the feeling, essence, and style of the selected rhythms through their movements and dance holds". The ISU required that ice dance teams in order to "comply with the ethical values of sports, any music chosen for Ice Dance competitions must not include aggressive and/or offending lyrics".

Junior ice dance teams had to execute one sequence of the Westminster Waltz, which was evaluated as two sections skated and/or performed to any waltz dance music and/or dance styles(s). This sequence had to have a constant tempo with either a minimum of 54 three-beat measures per minute or162 beats per minutes skated in 3/4 or 6/8 time. Its duration could last for "any exact number of musical phrases". For their pattern dance elements, junior teams had skated the first step of the dance on the first beat of a musical phrase, started to the left of the judges. They were permitted to execute a variation of holds throughout the pattern dance elements, but not extended hand-in-hand holds.

Senior ice dancing teams had to perform one section of the Golden Waltz pattern dance. They had to skate and/or perform to any waltz music and/or dance style with a consistent tempo of either a minimum or 62 three-beat measures per minute or 186 beat per minute, skated in either 3/4 or 6/8 time. The first step of their pattern dance elements had to start on the first beat, and the partners had to remain in contact at all times, even during changes of holds.

Seniors had to perform a creative dance element (CDE), which was supposed to be executed in contact and could include a hand-in-hand hold with fully extended arms. In the CDE, teams executing a brief release in order to change holds was not considered a separation. The CDE had the following requirements:

- Both partners had to perform steps and/or movements from one barrier of the rink to the other, which was fulfilled when at least one partner is not over two meters from each barrier.
- Only one dance stop, not over five seconds long, anywhere within the CDE. Any step performed at any time during the CDE was considered a dance stop, but any stationary spinning movement was not.
- One acrobatic movement, which had to include agility and balance, had to be performed by one or both partners, but without the other partner's assistance. If they stop briefly to execute the acrobatic movement, it was not considered a dance stop. The partners can also touch the ice, but it is not considered as the five seconds they are allowed to touch the ice. (Note: One of both partners can touch the ice with any part of their bodies during the five seconds, but they do not have to start and stop at the same time.)
- The CDE had to be presented to all sides of the rink, although directing it exclusively to the judges does not fulfill this requirement.

Both junior and senior teams had to execute one not-touching step sequence, skated to any dance rhythm and/or dance style. Juniors' chosen pattern had to be midline or diagonal, and seniors' chose pattern had to be circular and in the clockwise direction. Loops and retrogression were not permitted. Both senior and junior ice dance teams had to perform one short lift during the RD, lasting up to eight seconds. Each partner had to execute at least two twizzles, but they could not be in contact with each other between twizzles. They could also execute up to one step between the two twizzles; each push execute during the twizzles, including the scooter push, and/or the transfer of weight while on two feet between the twizzles is considered a step.

== Rhythm dance by season ==
| Season | Character or theme | Rhythms, musical styles or music examples | Pattern dance | Source |
|---|---|---|---|---|
| 2026/27 | Rhythm and Waltz | Traditional forms to modern interpretation | Westminister waltz (juniors), Golden waltz (seniors) | |
| 2025/26 | The Music, Dance Styles and Feeling of the 1990s | Pop/street Latin, house/techno, hip-hop, grunge rock | – | |
| 2024/25 | Social Dances and Styles of the 1950s, 1960s and 1970s | Rock n’ roll, jitterbug, twist, the hustle, disco | Paso Doble (modified, incl. steps 8-16, 26-28) | |
| 2023/24 | Music and Feeling of the Eighties | | – | |
| 2022/23 | Latin Dance Styles | Salsa, bachata, merengue, mambo, cha cha, rhumba, samba | – | |
| 2021/22 | Street Dance Rhythms | Hip hop, disco, swing, krump, popping, funk, jazz, reggae, reggaeton, blues | Midnight Blues (steps 5–14) | |
| 2020/21 | Music from Musicals and/or Operettas | Quickstep, blues, march, polka, foxtrot, swing, Charleston, waltz | Finnstep (steps 1–33) | |
| 2019/20 | Music from Musicals and/or Operettas | Quickstep, blues, march, polka, foxtrot, swing, Charleston, waltz | Finnstep (steps 1–33) | |
| 2018/19 | Tango | Tango | Tango Romantica | |
| 2017/18 (Note: Prior 2018/19 the rhythm dance was called short dance.) | Latin American rhythms | Cha cha, rumba, samba, mambo, merengue, salsa, bachata... | Rhumba | |
| 2016/17 | Blues | Blues plus one additional: swing, hip hop | Midnight Blues | |
| 2015/16 | Waltz | Waltz plus any of: foxtrot, march, polka | Ravensburger Waltz | |
| 2014/15 | Spanish Dance Rhythms | One to three Spanish Dance Rhythms | Paso Doble | |
| 2013/14 | Quickstep | Quickstep plus possibly: foxtrot, Charleston, swing | Finnstep | |
| 2011/12 | Polka, march, waltz | One to three of polka, march, waltz | Yankee Polka | |
| 2010/11 | Waltz | Waltz plus on to two of: foxtrot, quickstep, tango | Golden Waltz | |

== Works cited ==
- "Communication No. 2704: Ice Dance: Requirements for Technical Rules season 2025/26" (PDF). International Skating Union. 8 August 2025. Archived (PDF) from the original on 13 August 2025.
- "Communication No. 2795: Ice Dance: Requirements for Technical Specifications Season 2026/27" (PDF). International Skating Union. 15 June 2026. Archived (PDF) from the original on 24 June 2026.
- "Special Regulations & Technical Rules – Single & Pair Skating and Ice Dance 2024" (PDF). International Skating Union. June 2024. Archived (PDF) from the original on 9 November 2024.
