= Susi Handschmann =

Austrian former ice dancer (born 1959)

Personal information
- Full name: Susanne Handschmann
- Born: 2 March 1959 (age 67) Vienna, Austria
- Height: 1.60 m (5 ft 3 in)

Figure skating career
- Country: Austria
- Partner: Peter Handschmann
- Retired: 1980

Susanne "Susi" Handschmann (born 2 March 1959) is an Austrian former ice dancer. With her brother, Peter Handschmann, she is a six-time Austrian national champion (1975–1980) and competed at two Winter Olympics (1976, 1980).

== Personal life ==
Susi Handschmann was born on 2 March 1959 in Vienna, Austria. She is the younger sister of Peter Handschmann.

== Career ==
The Handschmann siblings won their first national title in 1975. They finished 16th at the 1975 European Championships in Copenhagen, Denmark.

The following season, the Handschmanns placed 11th at the 1976 European Championships in Geneva, Switzerland. In February, they competed at their first Olympics, held in Innsbruck, Austria; they withdrew following the compulsory dances, in which they ranked 12th. Returning to competition, they finished 12th at the 1976 World Championships in Gothenburg, Sweden.

The Handschmanns created the Austrian Waltz pattern dance. They first performed it in 1979 in Vienna. Their best ISU Championship results, 7th, came at the 1979 Europeans in Zagreb, Yugoslavia, and 1979 Worlds in Vienna.

In their final competitive season, the siblings won their sixth consecutive national title and placed 11th at the 1980 Winter Olympics in Lake Placid, New York.

== Results ==
(with Peter Handschmann)

International
Event	74–75	75–76	76–77	77–78	78–79	79–80
Winter Olympics		WD				11th
World Championships		12th	13th	10th	7th	
European Championships	16th	11th	8th	10th	7th	9th
Ennia Challenge Cup					3rd	3rd
Schäfer Memorial		3rd				
National
Austrian Championships	1st	1st	1st	1st	1st	1st
WD = Withdrew
